= Phil Keen =

British motor car racing driver (born 1983)

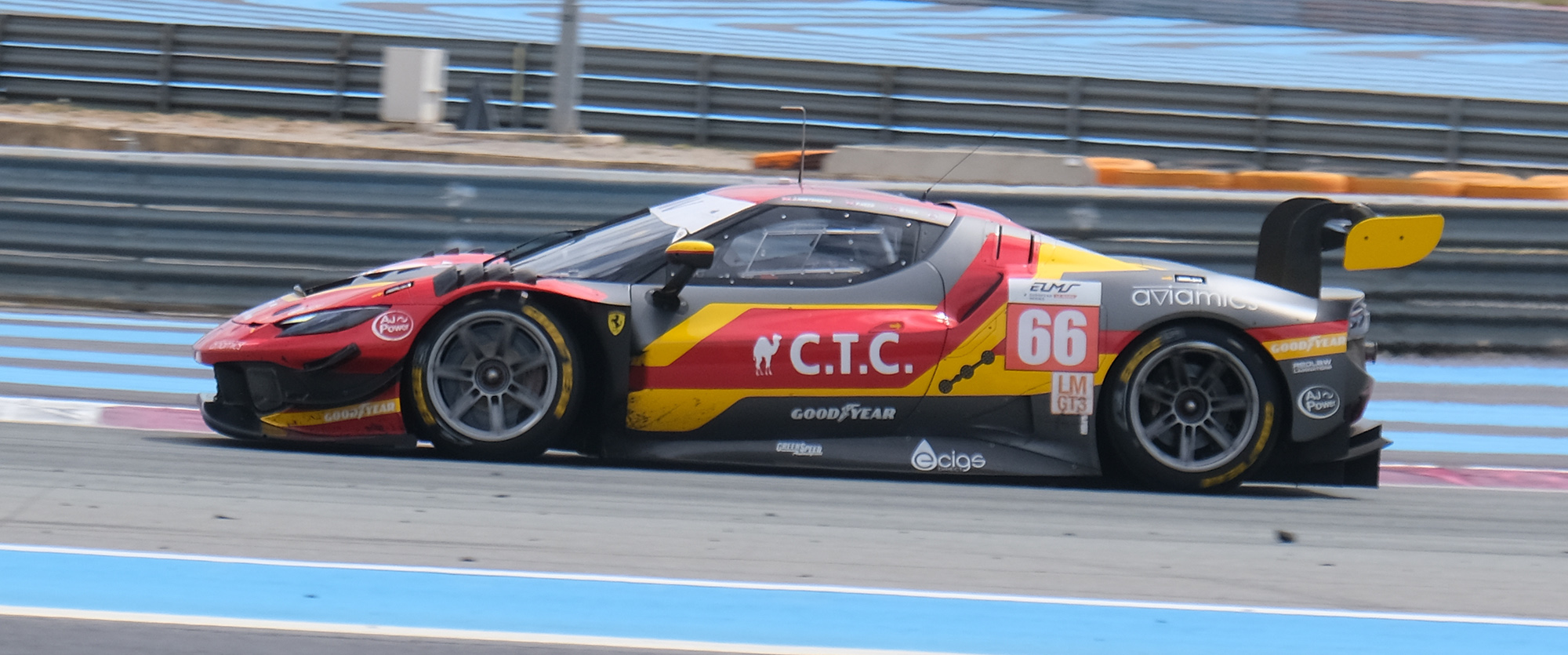
- Keen driving his Ferrari 296 GT3 in 2024
- Nationality: (United Kingdom) British
- Born: 20 October 1983 (age 43) Berkshire, England

British GT Championship career
- Debut season: 2006
- Current team: Team Parker Racing
- Categorisation: FIA Silver (until 2016); FIA Gold (2017–)
- Car number: 30
- Former teams: Eclipse Motorsport, Trackspeed, Damax, Apex Motorsport, Team RPM, ABG Motorsport, Complete Racing, Barwell Motorsport, WPI Motorsport, 2 Seas Motorsport
- Starts: 136
- Wins: 24
- Poles: 16
- Fastest laps: 23
- Best finish: 2nd (Overall), 1st (Supersport Class) in 2016-2018, 2009

Awards
- 2015: Sunoco Whelen Challenge

Phil Keen (born 20 October 1983 in Reading, Berkshire) is a British professional racing driver who currently competes in the European Le Mans Series for JMW Motorsport. He is the most successful driver in British GT history, having three times finished runner-up in the top class (GT3). He was an official Lamborghini factory driver in 2019, when he won the GT World Challenge Europe Pro-Am title, and concurrently works as an engineer in Henley-on-Thames. He was also the third and final Stig in British automotive show Top Gear from December 2010 until 2019, with his portrayal being kept secret over the years.

== Career ==
=== 2023 ===
In 2023, Keen returned to the British GT Championship in a substitute role, deputizing for 2 Seas Motorsport drivers Jules Gounon and Jonathan Adam while the two fulfilled their respective factory commitments. As of April 2023, prior to the start of the 2023 season, Keen held the record for most victories in the series.

== Stunt work ==
Keen is known for his work on Ben Collins Stunt Driver (2015) and Monday Motorsport (2017).

From 2010 to 2022, Keen portrayed the third incarnation of The Stig in BBC television show Top Gear. This was officially confirmed in 2024, when presenter Jeremy Clarkson revealed the information during a Q&A session.

== Racing record ==
Year	Position	Race
2018	1st	Moss Trophy
2017	2nd	British GT Championship - GT3
2017	3rd	Michelin Le Mans Cup - GT3
2017	1st	Kinrara Trophy
2016	2nd	British GT Championship - GT3
2016	2nd	74th Members Meeting Bruce McLaren Trophy
2014	1st	Radical Challenge SR3
2009	1st	British GT Championship - Supersport
2003	3rd	TVR Tuscan Challenge

=== Complete British GT Championship results ===
(key) (Races in bold indicate pole position in class) (Races in italics indicate fastest lap in class)

Year	Team	Car	Class	1	2	3	4	5	6	7	8	9	10	11	12	13	14	15	16	DC	Points
2006	Eclipse Motorsport	Mosler MT900R	GT2	OUL; 1; 3	OUL; 2; 3	DON; 1 Ret	PAU; 1	PAU; 2	MON; 1	MON; 2	SNE; 1; 3	SNE; 2; 3								4th	15
2006	Trackspeed	Porsche 996 GT3	GTC										**ROC**; **1**; 4	ROC; 2; 6	**BRH**; **1**; 8	BRH; 2; 11	SIL; 1; 6	MAG; 1	MAG; 2	6th	38
2007	Trackspeed	Porsche 996 GT3 RS	GTC	OUL; 1	OUL; 2	DON; 1	DON; 2	SNE; 1	**BRH**; **1**; 12	**BRH**; **2** Ret										8th	10
2007	Damax	Ascari KZ1-R	GT3								SIL; 1; 7	THR; 1; 9	THR; 2 Ret	CRO; 1	CRO; 2					28th	2
2007	Apex Motorsport	Jaguar XKR	GT3													ROC; 1; 17	ROC; 2 Ret			28th	2
2008	Team RPM	Dodge Viper Competition Coupe	GT3	OUL; 1	OUL; 2	KNO; 1	KNO; 2	ROC; 1	ROC; 2	SNE; 1	SNE; 2	THR; 1	THR; 2	BRH; 1	BRH; 2	SIL; 1	DON; 1 Ret			NC	0
2009	ABG Motorsport	KTM X-Bow	Supersport	OUL; 1; 10	**OUL**; **2**; 13	SPA; 1	SPA; 2	ROC; 1	ROC; 2	KNO; 1	KNO; 2	SNE; 1	SNE; 2	DON; 1; 8	SIL; 1	BRH; 1	BRH; 2			1st	15
2011	Trackspeed	Porsche 997 GT3-R	GT3	OUL; 1	OUL; 2	SNE; 1 Ret	BRH; 1	SPA; 1	SPA; 2	ROC; 1; 3	ROC; 2; 6	DON; 1	SIL; 1							14th	23
2012	Trackspeed	Porsche 997 GT3-R	GT3	OUL; 1	OUL; 2	NUR; 1	NUR; 2	ROC; 1; 3	BRH; 1			SIL; 1 Ret	DON; 1; 5							15th	45
2012	Complete Racing	Aston Martin V8 Vantage GT4	GT4							SNE; 1; 18	SNE; 2; 13									11th	30
2013	Trackspeed	Porsche 997 GT3-R	GT3	OUL; 1; 1	OUL; 2 DSQ	ROC; 1; 21†	SIL; 1 Ret	SNE; 1; 7	SNE; 2 Ret	BRH; 1; 13	ZAN; 1; 6	ZAN; 2; 3	DON; 1; 9							14th	48
2014	Trackspeed	Porsche 997 GT3-R	GT3	OUL; 1; 10	OUL; 2; 2	ROC; 1 Ret	SIL; 1; 27†	SNE; 1; 1	SNE; 2; 4	SPA; 1; 1	SPA; 2 Ret	BRH; 1; 9	DON; 1; 1							4th	121.5
2015	Team Russia by Barwell Racing with Demon Tweeks	BMW Z4 GT3	GT3	OUL; 1 Ret	OUL; 2 Ret	ROC; 1; 8	SIL; 1 Ret	SPA; 1; 2	BRH; 1; 8	SNE; 1; 12	SNE; 2; 2	DON; 1; 3								6th	79.5
2016	Barwell Motorsport	Lamborghini Huracán GT3	GT3	BRH; 1 Ret	ROC; 1; 2	**OUL**; **1**; 7	OUL; 2; 3	SIL; 1; 1	SPA; 1; 6	SNE; 1; 1	**SNE**; **2**; 1	DON; 1 Ret								2nd	147.5
2017	Barwell Motorsport	Lamborghini Huracán GT3	GT3	OUL; 1; 1	OUL; 2; 1	ROC; 1; 4	SNE; 1; 1	**SNE**; **2**; 6	SIL; 1; 4	SPA; 1; 1	**SPA**; **2**; 9	**BRH**; **1**; 5	DON; 1 DSQ							2nd	161
2018	Barwell Motorsport	Lamborghini Huracán GT3	GT3	OUL; 1; 4	**OUL**; **2**; 1	**ROC**; **1**; 6	SNE; 1; 3	SNE; 2; 5	SIL; 1; 2	SPA; 1; 5	BRH; 1; 23	**DON**; **1**; 1								2nd	159.5
2019	Barwell Motorsport	Lamborghini Huracán GT3	GT3	OUL; 1; 2	**OUL**; **2**; 4	SNE; 1; 1	SNE; 2; 1	SIL; 1; 7	DON; 1; 5	SPA; 1 Ret	BRH; 1; 4	DON; 1; 23								4th	122
2020	Barwell Motorsport	Lamborghini Huracán GT3	GT3	OUL; 1; 7	**OUL**; **2**; 1	DON; 1; 4	DON; 2; 2	BRH; 1; 12	DON; 1; 2	SNE; 1; 7	SNE; 2; 1	SIL; 1; 9								3rd	134
2021	WPI Motorsport	Lamborghini Huracán GT3 Evo	GT3	BRH; 1; 1	SIL; 1; 11	DON; 1 Ret	SPA; 1; 2	SNE; 1; 7	SNE; 2; 3	OUL; 1; 4	OUL; 2; 1	**DON**; **1**; 12								4th	135
2022	WPI Motorsport	Lamborghini Huracán GT3 Evo	GT3	OUL; 1; 4	OUL; 2; 7	SIL; 1; 7	DON; 1; 6	SNE; 1; 2	SNE; 2; 14	SPA; 1; 27	BRH; 1	DON; 1								10th	68
2023	2 Seas Motorsport	Mercedes-AMG GT3 Evo	GT3	OUL; 1	OUL; 2	SIL; 1	DON; 1	SNE; 1	SNE; 2	ALG; 1; 6	BRH; 1	DON; 1								22nd	12
2024	2 Seas Motorsport	Mercedes-AMG GT3 Evo	GT3	OUL; 1; 2	OUL; 2; 3	SIL; 1; 10	DON; 1; 3	SPA; 1; 5	SNE; 1; 4	SNE; 2; 13										4th	103.5
2024	2 Seas Motorsport	Porsche 911 GT3 R (992)	GT3								DON; 1; 5	BRH; 1								4th	103.5
2025	Team Parker Racing	Mercedes-AMG GT4	GT4	DON; 1; 16	SIL; 1; 25	OUL; 1 WD	OUL; 2 WD	SPA; 1; 13	SNE; 1; 20	SNE; 2; 20	BRH; 1; 14	DON; 1 DNS								5th	79
2026	Paradine Competition	BMW M4 GT3 Evo	GT3	SIL; 1; 11	OUL; 1	OUL; 2	SPA; 1	SNE; 1	SNE; 2	DON; 1	BRH; 1									NC‡	0‡

^{†} Driver did not finish, but was classified as he completed 90% race distance. ^{‡} As Keen was a guest driver, he was ineligible for points.

=== Complete European Le Mans Series results ===
(key) (Races in bold indicate pole position; results in italics indicate fastest lap)

Year	Entrant	Class	Chassis	Engine	1	2	3	4	5	6	Rank	Points
2005	Tech9 Motorsport	GT2	Porsche 911 GT3-RSR (996)	Porsche 3.8 L Flat-6	SPA	MNZ	SIL	NÜR; 9	IST		NC	0
2007	Rollcentre Racing	LMP1	Pescarolo 01	Judd GV5.5 S2 5.5 L V10	MNZ; 6	VAL	NÜR	SPA	SIL	INT	NC	0
2011	Neil Garner Motorsport	FLM	Oreca FLM09	Chevrolet LS3 6.2 L V8	LEC; 3	**SPA**; 3	IMO	**SIL**; 4	EST		4th	33
2012	CURTIS Racing Technologies	LMPC	Oreca FLM09	Chevrolet LS3 6.2 L V8	LEC; 1	DON	PET				4th	25
2015	Gulf Racing UK	LMGTE	Porsche 911 RSR	Porsche 4.0 L Flat-6	SIL; 1	IMO; 8	RBR	LEC; 7	EST; 3		7th	50
2024	JMW Motorsport	LMGT3	Ferrari 296 GT3	Ferrari F163 3.0 L Turbo V6	CAT; Ret	LEC; 10	IMO; 10	SPA; Ret	MUG	ALG	17th	2

=== Complete GT World Challenge Europe results ===
==== GT World Challenge Europe Endurance Cup ====
(key) (Races in bold indicate pole position) (Races in italics indicate fastest lap)

Year	Team	Car	Class	1	2	3	4	5	6	7	8	Pos.	Points
2012	GT3 Racing	Audi R8 LMS	Pro-Am	MNZ	SIL	LEC	SPA; 6H; 35	SPA; 12H; 28	SPA; 24H; 14	NÜR	NAV	58th	2
2015	Team Russia by Barwell	BMW Z4 GT3	Pro-Am	MNZ	SIL	LEC	SPA; 6H; 15	SPA; 12H; 20	SPA; 24H; 8	NÜR		17th	19
2016	Barwell Motorsport	Lamborghini Huracán GT3	Pro-Am	MNZ	SIL; Ret	LEC; 12	SPA; 6H; 25	SPA; 12H; 28	SPA; 24H; 17	NÜR; 24		6th	47
2017	Barwell Motorsport	Lamborghini Huracán GT3	Pro-Am	MNZ	SIL	LEC	SPA; 6H; 57	SPA; 12H; 49	SPA; 24H; Ret	CAT		NC	0
2018	GRT Grasser Racing Team	Lamborghini Huracán GT3	Pro	MNZ; 20	SIL; 17	LEC; 39	SPA; 6H; 14	SPA; 12H; 27	SPA; 24H; Ret	CAT; Ret		NC	0
2019	Orange 1 FFF Racing Team	Lamborghini Huracán GT3	Pro	MNZ; 17	SIL; 2	LEC; 20	SPA; 6H; 19	SPA; 12H; 16	SPA; 24H; 21	CAT; 4		9th	30
2020	Orange1 FFF Racing Team	Lamborghini Huracán GT3 Evo	Pro-Am	IMO; 33	NÜR; 18	SPA; 6H; 55	SPA; 12H; 55	SPA; 24H; Ret	LEC; 27			5th	52
2021	Orange 1 FFF Racing Team	Lamborghini Huracán GT3 Evo	Pro-Am	MNZ; 16	LEC; 22	SPA; 6H; 35	SPA; 12H; Ret	SPA; 24H; Ret	NÜR; 19	CAT; 35		3rd	74

==== GT World Challenge Europe Sprint Cup ====
(key) (Races in bold indicate pole position) (Races in italics indicate fastest lap)

Year	Team	Car	Class	1	2	3	4	5	6	7	8	9	10	Pos.	Points
2019	Orange1 FFF Racing Team	Lamborghini Huracán GT3	Pro-Am	BRH; 1; 14	BRH; 2; 14	MIS; 1; 15	MIS; 2; 17	ZAN; 1; 18	ZAN; 2; 20	NÜR; 1; 21	NÜR; 2; 20	HUN; 1; 22	HUN; 2; 21	1st	131
2020	ERC Sport	Mercedes-AMG GT3 Evo	Pro-Am	MIS; 1; 17	MIS; 2; 19	MIS; 3; 17	MAG; 1 Ret	MAG; 2; 19	ZAN; 1; 10	ZAN; 2; 19	CAT; 1; 17	CAT; 2; 18	CAT; 3; 15	5th	74
2024	Madpanda Motorsport	Mercedes-AMG GT3 Evo	Pro	BRH; 1	BRH; 2	MIS; 1; 11	MIS; 2; 8	HOC; 1 Ret	HOC; 2; 10	MAG; 1	MAG; 2	CAT; 1	CAT; 2	18th	2.5

Sporting positions
Preceded by Inaugural	British GT Championship; Supersport Champion; 2009; With: Marcus Clutton	Succeeded by None (Class discontinued)
Preceded by Markus Winkelhock; Nyls Stievenart (GT Series Sprint Cup)	Blancpain GT World Challenge Europe; Pro-Am Champion; 2019; With: Hiroshi Hamaguchi	Succeeded by Eddie Cheever III; Chris Froggatt (GT World Challenge Europe Sprint Cup)
