= Matías Russo =

Argentine racing driver

- Nationality: (Argentina) Argentine
- Born: September 4, 1985 (age 41) Paraná, Argentina

FIA GT Championship career
- Debut season: 2008
- Current team: Pecom
- Categorisation: FIA Gold (until 2023); FIA Silver (2024–)
- Starts: 12
- Wins: 0
- Poles: 0
- Fastest laps: 0
- Best finish: 14 in 2008

Previous series
- 2009 2008 2007 2006 2005 2004–2003 2001: FIA GT; FIA GT; Turismo Carretera; TRV6; Italian Formula 3000; Formula Renault Argentina; Formula Three Sudamericana

24 Hours of Le Mans career
- Years: 2009, 2011
- Teams: AF Corse, PeCom Racing
- Best finish: 26th
- Class wins: 0

Matías Russo (born September 4, 1985) is an Argentine racing driver. He has run in different series, with major success in FIA GT Championship.

Russo won the GT2 class of the 2008 FIA GT San Luis 2 Hours with team-mate Luís Pérez Companc on the Ferrari F430.

== Racing results ==
=== Complete Italian/Euro Formula 3000 results ===
(key) (Races in bold indicate pole position; races in italics indicate fastest lap)

Year	Entrant	1	2	3	4	5	6	7	8	DC	Points
2005	BCN Competicion	ADR; 7	VAL; 10	CHE; 8	MON	MUG	MAG	MOZ	MIS	**21**	**3**

=== Complete European Le Mans Series results ===
(key) (Races in bold indicate pole position; results in italics indicate fastest lap)

Year	Entrant	Class	Chassis	Engine	1	2	3	4	5	Pos.	Points
2010	AF Corse	GT2	Ferrari F430 GT2	Ferrari F136 4.0 L V8	LEC; 5	SPA; 11	ALG; 6	HUN; 8	SIL; 9	**7th**	**38**
2011	Pecom Racing	LMP2	Lola B11/40	Judd-BMW HK 3.6 L V8	LEC; 2	SPA; Ret	IMO; 4	SIL; Ret	EST; Ret	10th	22

== 24 Hours of Le Mans results ==
Year	Team	Co-Drivers	Car	Class	Laps	Pos.	Class Pos.
2009	(Italy) AF Corse	(Italy) Gianmaria Bruni (Argentina) Luis Pérez Companc	Ferrari F430 GT2	GT2	317	26th	6th
2011	(Argentina) PeCom Racing	(Argentina) Luis Pérez Companc (Germany) Pierre Kaffer	Lola B11/40-Judd	LMP2	139	DNF	DNF
