= 2011 6 Hours of Silverstone =

Map of the Silverstone Grand Prix Circuit

The 2011 Autosport 6 Hours of Silverstone was an auto racing event held at the Silverstone Circuit on 11 September 2011. It was the fourth round of the 2011 Le Mans Series season and the fifth round of the 2011 Intercontinental Le Mans Cup.

== Qualifying ==
=== Qualifying result ===
Pole position winners in each class are marked in bold.

Pos	Class	Team	Driver	Lap Time	Grid
1	**LMP1**	**#7 Peugeot Sport Total**	**Simon Pagenaud**	**1:43.924**	**1**
2	LMP1	#2 Audi Sport Team Joest	Allan McNish	1:44.856	2
3	LMP1	#8 Peugeot Sport Total	Stéphane Sarrazin	1:45.102	3
4	LMP1	#1 Audi Sport Team Joest	Timo Bernhard	1:46.621	4
5	LMP1	#12 Rebellion Racing	Nicolas Prost	1:47.684	5
6	LMP1	#15 OAK Racing	Guillaume Moreau	1:47.785	6
7	LMP1	#24 OAK Racing	Alexandre Prémat	1:47.890	7
8	LMP1	#13 Rebellion Racing	Jean-Christophe Boullion	1:48.287	8
9	LMP1	#16 Pescarolo Team	Julien Jousse	1:48.624	9
10	**LMP2**	**#42 Strakka Racing**	**Danny Watts**	**1:49.619**	**10**
11	LMP2	#41 Greaves Motorsport	Tom Kimber-Smith	1:50.922	11
12	LMP1	#007 Aston Martin Racing	Adrián Fernández	1:52.151	12
13	LMP2	#46 TDS Racing	Jody Firth	1:52.224	13
14	LMP2	#40 Race Performance	Michel Frey	1:52.457	14
15	LMP2	#26 Signatech Nissan	Lucas Ordoñez	1:53.233	15
16	LMP2	#45 Boutsen Energy Racing	Dominik Kraihamer	1:53.247	16
17	LMP2	#39 Pecom Racing	Matías Russo	1:53.791	17
18	LMP2	#36 RML	Thomas Erdos	1:55.236	18
19	LMP2	#35 OAK Racing	Jean-François Yvon	1:57.817	19
20	**FLM**	**#92 Neil Garner Motorsport**	**Phil Keen**	**1:58.143**	**20**
21	FLM	#99 JMB Racing	Kyle Marcelli	1:59.053	21
22	FLM	#93 Genoa Racing	Jordan Grogor	1:59.907	22
23	FLM	#95 Pegasus Racing	Julien Schell	2:00.061	23
24	**GTE-Pro**	**#55 BMW Motorsport**	**Augusto Farfus**	**2:01.768**	**24**
25	GTE-Pro	#56 BMW Motorsport	Andy Priaulx	2:02.096	25
26	GTE-Pro	#71 AF Corse	Toni Vilander	2:02.774	26
27	GTE-Pro	#77 Team Felbermayr-Proton	Marc Lieb	2:02.787	27
28	GTE-Pro	#59 Luxury Racing	Frédéric Makowiecki	2:02.934	28
29	GTE-Pro	#76 IMSA Performance Matmut	Wolf Henzler	2:02.937	29
30	GTE-Pro	#75 Prospeed Competition	Marco Holzer	2:02.950	30
31	GTE-Pro	#51 AF Corse	Gianmaria Bruni	2:02.971	31
32	GTE-Pro	#66 JMW Motorsport	Rob Bell	2:03.118	32
33	GTE-Pro	#70 Kessel Racing	Philipp Peter	2:03.295	33
34	GTE-Pro	#79 Jota	Sam Hancock	2:03.433	34
35	GTE-Pro	#58 Luxury Racing	Anthony Beltoise	2:03.659	35
36	GTE-Pro	#89 Hankook Team Farnbacher	Allan Simonsen	2:03.864	36
37	**GTE-Am**	**#67 IMSA Performance Matmut**	**Nicolas Armindo**	**2:04.028**	**37**
38	GTE-Am	#63 Proton Competition	Patrick Long	2:04.172	38
39	GTE-Am	#62 CRS Racing	Tim Mullen	2:04.427	39
40	GTE-Am	#57 Krohn Racing	Niclas Jönsson	2:04.987	40
41	GTE-Am	#61 AF Corse	Marco Cioci	2:05.103	41
42	GTE-Pro	#65 Lotus Jetalliance	James Rossiter	2:05.143	42
43	GTE-Am	#88 Team Felbermayr-Proton	Horst Felbermayr, Jr.	2:06.392	43
44	GTE-Am	#60 Gulf AMR Middle East	Fabien Giroix	2:06.976	44
45	GTE-Pro	#64 Lotus Jetalliance	David Heinemeier Hansson	2:07.831	45
46	GTE-Am	#82 CRS Racing	Klaas Hummel	2:13.219	46
47	LMP1	#23 MIK Corse	No Time		47
48	LMP2	#43 RLR msport	No Time		48
49	GTE-Am	#50 Larbre Compétition	No Time		49

== Race result ==
Class winners in bold. Cars failing to complete 70% of winner's distance marked as Not Classified (NC).

Pos	Class	No	Team	Drivers	Chassis	Tyre	Laps
Pos	Class	No	Team	Drivers	Engine	Tyre	Laps
1	**LMP1**	**7**	**(France) Peugeot Sport Total**	**(France) Sébastien Bourdais (France) Simon Pagenaud**	**Peugeot 908**	MI	**190**
1	**LMP1**	**7**	**(France) Peugeot Sport Total**	**(France) Sébastien Bourdais (France) Simon Pagenaud**	**Peugeot HDi 3.7 L V8 (Diesel)**	MI	**190**
2	LMP1	1	(Germany) Audi Sport Team Joest	(Germany) Timo Bernhard (Switzerland) Marcel Fässler	Audi R18 TDI	MI	190
2	LMP1	1	(Germany) Audi Sport Team Joest	(Germany) Timo Bernhard (Switzerland) Marcel Fässler	Audi TDI 3.7 L Turbo V6 (Diesel)	MI	190
3	LMP1	24	(France) OAK Racing	(France) Olivier Pla (France) Alexandre Prémat	OAK Pescarolo 01	D	185
3	LMP1	24	(France) OAK Racing	(France) Olivier Pla (France) Alexandre Prémat	Judd DB 3.4 L V8	D	185
4	LMP1	13	(Switzerland) Rebellion Racing	(Italy) Andrea Belicchi (France) Jean-Christophe Boullion	Lola B10/60	MI	185
4	LMP1	13	(Switzerland) Rebellion Racing	(Italy) Andrea Belicchi (France) Jean-Christophe Boullion	Toyota RV8KLM 3.4 L V8	MI	185
5	LMP1	15	(France) OAK Racing	(France) Matthieu Lahaye (France) Guillaume Moreau (France) Pierre Ragues	OAK Pescarolo 01	D	185
5	LMP1	15	(France) OAK Racing	(France) Matthieu Lahaye (France) Guillaume Moreau (France) Pierre Ragues	Judd DB 3.4 L V8	D	185
6	LMP1	16	(France) Pescarolo Team	(France) Emmanuel Collard (France) Christophe Tinseau (France) Julien Jousse	Pescarolo 01	MI	185
6	LMP1	16	(France) Pescarolo Team	(France) Emmanuel Collard (France) Christophe Tinseau (France) Julien Jousse	Judd GV5 S2 5.0 L V10	MI	185
7	LMP1	2	(Germany) Audi Sport Team Joest	(Denmark) Tom Kristensen (United Kingdom) Allan McNish	Audi R18 TDI	MI	184
7	LMP1	2	(Germany) Audi Sport Team Joest	(Denmark) Tom Kristensen (United Kingdom) Allan McNish	Audi TDI 3.7 L Turbo V6 (Diesel)	MI	184
8	LMP1	8	(France) Peugeot Sport Total	(France) Franck Montagny (France) Stéphane Sarrazin	Peugeot 908	MI	181
8	LMP1	8	(France) Peugeot Sport Total	(France) Franck Montagny (France) Stéphane Sarrazin	Peugeot HDi 3.7 L V8 (Diesel)	MI	181
9	LMP1	007	(United Kingdom) Aston Martin Racing	(Mexico) Adrián Fernández (Switzerland) Harold Primat (Austria) Christian Klien	Lola-Aston Martin B09/60	MI	179
9	LMP1	007	(United Kingdom) Aston Martin Racing	(Mexico) Adrián Fernández (Switzerland) Harold Primat (Austria) Christian Klien	Aston Martin AM04 6.0 L V12	MI	179
10	**LMP2**	**41**	**(United Kingdom) Greaves Motorsport**	**(Saudi Arabia) Karim Ojjeh (United Kingdom) Tom Kimber-Smith (France) Olivier Lombard**	**Zytek Z11SN**	D	**178**
10	**LMP2**	**41**	**(United Kingdom) Greaves Motorsport**	**(Saudi Arabia) Karim Ojjeh (United Kingdom) Tom Kimber-Smith (France) Olivier Lombard**	**Nissan VK45DE 4.5 L V8**	D	**178**
11	LMP2	40	(Switzerland) Race Performance	(Switzerland) Michel Frey (Switzerland) Ralph Meichtry (France) Marc Rostan	Oreca 03	D	177
11	LMP2	40	(Switzerland) Race Performance	(Switzerland) Michel Frey (Switzerland) Ralph Meichtry (France) Marc Rostan	Judd-BMW HK 3.6 L V8	D	177
12	LMP2	45	(Belgium) Boutsen Energy Racing	(Norway) Thor-Christian Ebbesvik (Austria) Dominik Kraihamer	Oreca 03	D	176
12	LMP2	45	(Belgium) Boutsen Energy Racing	(Norway) Thor-Christian Ebbesvik (Austria) Dominik Kraihamer	Nissan VK45DE 4.5 L V8	D	176
13	LMP2	36	(United Kingdom) RML	(United Kingdom) Mike Newton (Brazil) Thomas Erdos (United Kingdom) Ben Collins	HPD ARX-01d	D	176
13	LMP2	36	(United Kingdom) RML	(United Kingdom) Mike Newton (Brazil) Thomas Erdos (United Kingdom) Ben Collins	HPD HR28TT 2.8 L Turbo V6	D	176
14	LMP2	43	(United Kingdom) RLR msport	(United Kingdom) Barry Gates (United Kingdom) Warren Hughes (United Kingdom) Rob Garofall	MG-Lola EX265	D	171
14	LMP2	43	(United Kingdom) RLR msport	(United Kingdom) Barry Gates (United Kingdom) Warren Hughes (United Kingdom) Rob Garofall	Judd-BMW HK 3.6 L V8	D	171
15	LMP2	35	(France) OAK Racing	(Belgium) Andrea Barlesi (France) Frédéric Da Rocha (France) Patrice Lafargue	OAK Pescarolo 01	D	171
15	LMP2	35	(France) OAK Racing	(Belgium) Andrea Barlesi (France) Frédéric Da Rocha (France) Patrice Lafargue	Judd-BMW HK 3.6 L V8	D	171
16	LMP2	26	(France) Signatech Nissan	(France) Franck Mailleux (Spain) Lucas Ordoñez (France) Jean-Karl Vernay	Oreca 03	MI	170
16	LMP2	26	(France) Signatech Nissan	(France) Franck Mailleux (Spain) Lucas Ordoñez (France) Jean-Karl Vernay	Nissan VK45DE 4.5 L V8	MI	170
17	**FLM**	**95**	**(France) Pegasus Racing**	**(Germany) Mirco Schultis (Germany) Patrick Simon (France) Julien Schell**	**Oreca FLM09**	MI	**169**
17	**FLM**	**95**	**(France) Pegasus Racing**	**(Germany) Mirco Schultis (Germany) Patrick Simon (France) Julien Schell**	**Chevrolet LS3 6.2 L V8**	MI	**169**
18	FLM	93	(United States) Genoa Racing	(Australia) Aldous Mitchell (South Africa) Jordan Grogor (Canada) Bassam Kronfli	Oreca FLM09	MI	169
18	FLM	93	(United States) Genoa Racing	(Australia) Aldous Mitchell (South Africa) Jordan Grogor (Canada) Bassam Kronfli	Chevrolet LS3 6.2 L V8	MI	169
19	FLM	99	(Monaco) JMB Racing	(Canada) Kyle Marcelli (United States) Chapman Ducote (Italy) Luca Moro	Oreca FLM09	MI	168
19	FLM	99	(Monaco) JMB Racing	(Canada) Kyle Marcelli (United States) Chapman Ducote (Italy) Luca Moro	Chevrolet LS3 6.2 L V8	MI	168
20	**GTE; Pro**	**51**	**(Italy) AF Corse**	**(Italy) Giancarlo Fisichella (Italy) Gianmaria Bruni**	**Ferrari 458 Italia GT2**	MI	**168**
20	**GTE; Pro**	**51**	**(Italy) AF Corse**	**(Italy) Giancarlo Fisichella (Italy) Gianmaria Bruni**	**Ferrari 4.5 L V8**	MI	**168**
21	GTE; Pro	59	(France) Luxury Racing	(Monaco) Stéphane Ortelli (France) Frédéric Makowiecki	Ferrari 458 Italia GT2	MI	167
21	GTE; Pro	59	(France) Luxury Racing	(Monaco) Stéphane Ortelli (France) Frédéric Makowiecki	Ferrari 4.5 L V8	MI	167
22	GTE; Pro	77	(Germany) Team Felbermayr-Proton	(Germany) Marc Lieb (Austria) Richard Lietz	Porsche 997 GT3-RSR	MI	167
22	GTE; Pro	77	(Germany) Team Felbermayr-Proton	(Germany) Marc Lieb (Austria) Richard Lietz	Porsche 4.0 L Flat-6	MI	167
23	GTE; Pro	56	(Germany) BMW Motorsport	(United Kingdom) Andy Priaulx (Germany) Uwe Alzen	BMW M3 GT2	D	167
23	GTE; Pro	56	(Germany) BMW Motorsport	(United Kingdom) Andy Priaulx (Germany) Uwe Alzen	BMW 4.0 L V8	D	167
24	GTE; Pro	75	(Belgium) Prospeed Competition	(Belgium) Marc Goossens (Germany) Marco Holzer	Porsche 997 GT3-RSR	MI	167
24	GTE; Pro	75	(Belgium) Prospeed Competition	(Belgium) Marc Goossens (Germany) Marco Holzer	Porsche 4.0 L Flat-6	MI	167
25	LMP2	42	(United Kingdom) Strakka Racing	(United Kingdom) Nick Leventis (United Kingdom) Danny Watts (United Kingdom) Jonny Kane	HPD ARX-01d	MI	167
25	LMP2	42	(United Kingdom) Strakka Racing	(United Kingdom) Nick Leventis (United Kingdom) Danny Watts (United Kingdom) Jonny Kane	HPD HR28TT 2.8 L Turbo V6	MI	167
26	GTE; Pro	55	(Germany) BMW Motorsport	(Brazil) Augusto Farfus (Germany) Jörg Müller	BMW M3 GT2	D	167
26	GTE; Pro	55	(Germany) BMW Motorsport	(Brazil) Augusto Farfus (Germany) Jörg Müller	BMW 4.0 L V8	D	167
27	GTE; Pro	76	(France) IMSA Performance Matmut	(France) Patrick Pilet (Germany) Wolf Henzler	Porsche 997 GT3-RSR	MI	167
27	GTE; Pro	76	(France) IMSA Performance Matmut	(France) Patrick Pilet (Germany) Wolf Henzler	Porsche 4.0 L Flat-6	MI	167
28	GTE; Pro	89	(Germany) Hankook Team Farnbacher	(Germany) Dominik Farnbacher (Denmark) Allan Simonsen	Ferrari 458 Italia GT2	HK	167
28	GTE; Pro	89	(Germany) Hankook Team Farnbacher	(Germany) Dominik Farnbacher (Denmark) Allan Simonsen	Ferrari 4.5 L V8	HK	167
29	GTE; Pro	66	(United Kingdom) JMW Motorsport	(United Kingdom) Rob Bell (United Kingdom) James Walker	Ferrari 458 Italia GT2	D	166
29	GTE; Pro	66	(United Kingdom) JMW Motorsport	(United Kingdom) Rob Bell (United Kingdom) James Walker	Ferrari 4.5 L V8	D	166
30	GTE; Pro	58	(France) Luxury Racing	(France) François Jakubowski (France) Anthony Beltoise (France) Nicolas Marroc	Ferrari 458 Italia GT2	MI	164
30	GTE; Pro	58	(France) Luxury Racing	(France) François Jakubowski (France) Anthony Beltoise (France) Nicolas Marroc	Ferrari 4.5 L V8	MI	164
31	**GTE; Am**	**67**	**(France) IMSA Performance Matmut**	**(France) Raymond Narac (France) Nicolas Armindo**	**Porsche 997 GT3-RSR**	MI	**164**
31	**GTE; Am**	**67**	**(France) IMSA Performance Matmut**	**(France) Raymond Narac (France) Nicolas Armindo**	**Porsche 4.0 L Flat-6**	MI	**164**
32	GTE; Pro	79	(United Kingdom) Jota	(United Kingdom) Simon Dolan (United Kingdom) Sam Hancock	Aston Martin V8 Vantage GT2	D	164
32	GTE; Pro	79	(United Kingdom) Jota	(United Kingdom) Simon Dolan (United Kingdom) Sam Hancock	Aston Martin 4.5 L V8	D	164
33	GTE; Am	63	(Germany) Proton Competition	(Italy) Gianluca Roda (United States) Patrick Long	Porsche 997 GT3-RSR	MI	163
33	GTE; Am	63	(Germany) Proton Competition	(Italy) Gianluca Roda (United States) Patrick Long	Porsche 4.0 L Flat-6	MI	163
34	FLM	92	(United Kingdom) Neil Garner Motorsport	(United Kingdom) John Hartshorne (United Kingdom) Steve Keating (United Kingdom) Phil Keen	Oreca FLM09	MI	162
34	FLM	92	(United Kingdom) Neil Garner Motorsport	(United Kingdom) John Hartshorne (United Kingdom) Steve Keating (United Kingdom) Phil Keen	Chevrolet LS3 6.2 L V8	MI	162
35	GTE; Am	62	(United Kingdom) CRS Racing	(Germany) Pierre Ehret (United Kingdom) Shaun Lynn (New Zealand) Roger Willis	Ferrari F430 GTE	MI	162
35	GTE; Am	62	(United Kingdom) CRS Racing	(Germany) Pierre Ehret (United Kingdom) Shaun Lynn (New Zealand) Roger Willis	Ferrari 4.0 LV8	MI	162
36	GTE; Am	50	(France) Larbre Compétition	(France) Patrick Bornhauser (France) Julien Canal (Switzerland) Gabriele Gardel	Corvette C6.R	MI	162
36	GTE; Am	50	(France) Larbre Compétition	(France) Patrick Bornhauser (France) Julien Canal (Switzerland) Gabriele Gardel	Chevrolet 5.5 L V8	MI	162
37	GTE; Am	61	(Italy) AF Corse	(Italy) Piergiuseppe Perazzini (Italy) Marco Cioci (Belgium) Stéphane Lémeret	Ferrari F430 GTE	MI	162
37	GTE; Am	61	(Italy) AF Corse	(Italy) Piergiuseppe Perazzini (Italy) Marco Cioci (Belgium) Stéphane Lémeret	Ferrari 4.0 L V8	MI	162
38	GTE; Am	88	(Germany) Team Felbermayr-Proton	(Austria) Horst Felbermayr, Jr. (Germany) Christian Ried	Porsche 997 GT3-RSR	MI	162
38	GTE; Am	88	(Germany) Team Felbermayr-Proton	(Austria) Horst Felbermayr, Jr. (Germany) Christian Ried	Porsche 4.0 L Flat-6	MI	162
39	GTE; Am	57	(United States) Krohn Racing	(United States) Tracy Krohn (Sweden) Niclas Jönsson (Italy) Michele Rugolo	Ferrari F430 GTE	MI	161
39	GTE; Am	57	(United States) Krohn Racing	(United States) Tracy Krohn (Sweden) Niclas Jönsson (Italy) Michele Rugolo	Ferrari 4.0 L V8	MI	161
40	GTE; Pro	65	(Austria) Lotus Jetalliance	(United Kingdom) James Rossiter (United Kingdom) Johnny Mowlem (Austria) Karl Wendlinger	Lotus Evora GTE	MI	161
40	GTE; Pro	65	(Austria) Lotus Jetalliance	(United Kingdom) James Rossiter (United Kingdom) Johnny Mowlem (Austria) Karl Wendlinger	Toyota-Cosworth 4.0 L V6	MI	161
41	GTE; Am	60	(United Arab Emirates) Gulf AMR Middle East	(France) Fabien Giroix (Germany) Roald Goethe (United Kingdom) Michael Wainwright	Aston Martin V8 Vantage GT2	D	153
41	GTE; Am	60	(United Arab Emirates) Gulf AMR Middle East	(France) Fabien Giroix (Germany) Roald Goethe (United Kingdom) Michael Wainwright	Aston Martin 4.5 L V8	D	153
42	GTE; Am	82	(United Kingdom) CRS Racing	(Netherlands) Klaas Hummel (United Kingdom) Adam Christodoulou (United Kingdom) Phil Quaife	Ferrari F430 GTE	MI	133
42	GTE; Am	82	(United Kingdom) CRS Racing	(Netherlands) Klaas Hummel (United Kingdom) Adam Christodoulou (United Kingdom) Phil Quaife	Ferrari 4.0 L V8	MI	133
DNF	LMP1	12	(Switzerland) Rebellion Racing	(France) Nicolas Prost (Switzerland) Neel Jani	Lola B10/60	MI	159
DNF	LMP1	12	(Switzerland) Rebellion Racing	(France) Nicolas Prost (Switzerland) Neel Jani	Toyota RV8KLM 3.4 L V8	MI	159
DNF	GTE; Pro	70	(Switzerland) Kessel Racing	(Poland) Michał Broniszewski (Austria) Philipp Peter	Ferrari 458 Italia GT2	D	118
DNF	GTE; Pro	70	(Switzerland) Kessel Racing	(Poland) Michał Broniszewski (Austria) Philipp Peter	Ferrari 4.5 L V8	D	118
NC	GTE; Pro	64	(Austria) Lotus Jetalliance	(Austria) Lukas Lichtner-Hoyer (United Kingdom) Martin Rich (Denmark) David Heinemeier Hansson	Lotus Evora GTE	MI	114
NC	GTE; Pro	64	(Austria) Lotus Jetalliance	(Austria) Lukas Lichtner-Hoyer (United Kingdom) Martin Rich (Denmark) David Heinemeier Hansson	Toyota-Cosworth 4.0 L V6	MI	114
DNF	LMP2	39	(Argentina) Pecom Racing	(Argentina) Luís Pérez Companc (Argentina) Matías Russo (Germany) Pierre Kaffer	Lola B11/40	MI	103
DNF	LMP2	39	(Argentina) Pecom Racing	(Argentina) Luís Pérez Companc (Argentina) Matías Russo (Germany) Pierre Kaffer	Judd-BMW HK 3.6 L V8	MI	103
DNF	GTE; Pro	71	(Italy) AF Corse	(Brazil) Jaime Melo (Finland) Toni Vilander	Ferrari 458 Italia GT2	MI	92
DNF	GTE; Pro	71	(Italy) AF Corse	(Brazil) Jaime Melo (Finland) Toni Vilander	Ferrari 4.5 L V8	MI	92
DNF	LMP2	46	(Spain) TDS Racing	(Switzerland) Mathias Beche (France) Pierre Thiriet (United Kingdom) Jody Firth	Oreca 03	MI	23
DNF	LMP2	46	(Spain) TDS Racing	(Switzerland) Mathias Beche (France) Pierre Thiriet (United Kingdom) Jody Firth	Nissan VK45DE 4.5 L V8	MI	23
DNS	LMP1	23	(Italy) MIK Corse	(Spain) Máximo Cortés (Italy) Ferdinando Geri (Italy) Giacomo Piccini	Zytek 09SC	MI	-
DNS	LMP1	23	(Italy) MIK Corse	(Spain) Máximo Cortés (Italy) Ferdinando Geri (Italy) Giacomo Piccini	Zytek ZG348 3.4 L Hybrid V8	MI	-

Le Mans Series
Previous race: 6 Hours of Imola	2011 season	Next race: 6 Hours of Estoril
