= 2011 1000 km of Spa =

The Circuit de Spa-Francorchamps

The 2011 1000 km of Spa-Francorchamps was held at Circuit de Spa-Francorchamps on May 7, 2011. It was the second round of the 2011 Le Mans Series season and the 2011 Intercontinental Le Mans Cup. Prior to the race weekend there were up to 60 provisional entries but was shortened to 54 as there were some withdrawals from Aston Martin Racing who withdrew to continue developing their new and struggling AMR-One. It was a similar situation for Hope Racing who were not quite ready to race the new KERS-driven Oreca 01 Hybrid. Other cars had to withdraw from damage prior to the weekend including the No. 24 OAK Racing Pescarolo 01 LMP1 car.

In the second free practice session of the race, the No. 13 Rebellion Racing Lola-Toyota driven by Jean-Christophe Boullion crashed heavily at Radillon corner. Then shortly after the green flag was waved to restart, the No. 8 Peugeot of Pedro Lamy and No. 36 RML Honda of Mike Newton collided with each other. Both Peugeot and Rebellion mechanics had to deal with a late night with the RML car too heavily damaged to take further part in the race weekend.

== Qualifying ==
The qualifying session was stopped early when another heavy impact during the weekend halted proceedings. It was the remaining LMP1 car of OAK Racing that fell victim to the famous Spa-Francorchamps track. Matthieu Lahaye crashed heavily into a barrier resulting in much débris being put on the track. The session was red flagged and not restarted. This was bad news for Peugeot who decided to release their cars later on in the session but the red flags meant the two car only set one flying laps each. This resulted in the two cars No. 7 and 9 starting in 13th and 18th overall respectively, with the No. 8 Peugeot starting at the back of the grid for not participating in the qualifying session as it was still being repaired from the practice crash.

The No. 1 Audi driven by Timo Bernhard took pole position with No. 2 and 3 qualifying second and third respectively. Strakka Racing took LMP2 pole only marginally ahead of TDS Racing. In the FLM class, Phil Keen of Neil Garner Motorsport took pole for their car. The No. 71 AF Corse Ferrari starts first in the GTE Pro class while the No. 67 IMSA Matmut Porsche took pole in GTE Am.

=== Qualifying result ===
Pole position winners in each class are marked in bold.

Pos	Class	Team	Driver	Lap Time	Grid
1	**LMP1**	**#1 Audi Sport Team Joest**	**Timo Bernhard**	**2:01.502**	**1**
2	LMP1	#2 Audi Sport Team Joest	André Lotterer	2:01.788	2
3	LMP1	#3 Audi Sport North America	Tom Kristensen	2:02.145	3
4	LMP1	#10 Team Oreca-Matmut	Nicolas Lapierre	2:05.482	4
5	LMP1	#12 Rebellion Racing	Nicolas Prost	2:06.767	5
6	LMP1	#20 Quifel ASM Team	Olivier Pla	2:07.290	6
7	LMP1	#16 Pescarolo Team	Christophe Tinseau	2:07.528	7
8	LMP1	#15 OAK Racing	Matthieu Lahaye	2:07.729	8
9	LMP1	#23 MIK Corse	Giacomo Piccini	2:08.821	9
10	**LMP2**	**#42 Strakka Racing**	**Danny Watts**	**2:10.016**	**10**
11	LMP2	#46 TDS Racing	Mathias Beche	2:10.141	11
12	LMP2	#26 Signatech Nissan	Franck Mailleux	2:10.474	12
13	LMP1	#7 Peugeot Sport Total	Marc Gené	2:10.725	13
14	LMP2	#45 Boutsen Energy Racing	Nicolas de Crem	2:11.183	14
15	LMP2	#41 Greaves Motorsport	Tom Kimber-Smith	2:11.218	15
16	LMP2	#40 Race Performance	Ralph Meichtry	2:11.306	16
17	LMP2	#44 Extrême Limite AM Paris	Fabien Rosier	2:11.842	17
18	LMP1	#9 Peugeot Sport Total	Simon Pagenaud	2:12.108	18
19	LMP2	#35 OAK Racing	Andrea Barlesi	2:12.373	19
20	LMP2	#39 Pecom Racing	Pierre Kaffer	2:13.584	20
21	**FLM**	**#92 Neil Garner Motorsport**	**Phil Keen**	**2:13.592**	**21**
22	LMP2	#33 Level 5 Motorsports	Christophe Bouchut	2:13.851	22
23	LMP2	#43 RLR msport	Rob Garofall	2:14.122	23
24	FLM	#91 Hope Racing	Nicolas Marroc	2:14.431	24
25	FLM	#99 JMB Racing	Olivier Lombard	2:17.120	25
26	FLM	#93 Genoa Racing	Elton Julian	2:18.219	26
27	FLM	#95 Pegasus Racing	Julien Schell	2:18.757	27
28	**GTE-Pro**	**#71 AF Corse**	**Jaime Melo**	**2:20.743**	**28**
29	GTE-Pro	#66 JMW Motorsport	Rob Bell	2:20.915	29
30	GTE-Pro	#51 AF Corse	Giancarlo Fisichella	2:21.086	30
31	GTE-Pro	#77 Team Felbermayr-Proton	Marc Lieb	2:21.291	31
32	GTE-Pro	#55 BMW Motorsport	Augusto Farfus	2:21.460	32
33	GTE-Pro	#89 Hankook Team Farnbacher	Dominik Farnbacher	2:21.779	33
34	GTE-Pro	#56 BMW Motorsport	Andy Priaulx	2:22.219	34
35	GTE-Pro	#76 IMSA Performance Matmut	Wolf Henzler	2:22.955	35
36	**GTE-Am**	**#67 IMSA Performance Matmut**	**Nicolas Armindo**	**2:23.007**	**36**
37	GTE-Pro	#58 Luxury Racing	Anthony Beltoise	2:23.063	37
38	GTE-Am	#61 AF Corse	Marco Cioci	2:23.269	38
39	GTE-Am	#82 CRS Racing	Phil Quaife	2:23.485	39
40	GTE-Pro	#75 Prospeed Competition	Marc Goossens	2:23.639	40
41	GTE-Am	#60 Gulf AMR Middle East	Fabien Giroix	2:23.727	41
42	GTE-Am	#70 Kessel Racing	Philipp Peter	2:24.050	42
43	GTE-Am	#88 Team Felbermayr-Proton	Horst Felbermayr, Jr.	2:24.599	43
44	GTE-Am	#50 Larbre Compétition	Gabriele Gardel	2:24.773	44
45	GTE-Pro	#65 Lotus Jetalliance	James Rossiter	2:25.124	45
46	GTE-Am	#62 CRS Racing	Pierre Ehret	2:25.617	46
47	GTE-Am	#63 Proton Competition	Christian Ried	2:26.797	47
48	GTE-Pro	#59 Luxury Racing	Frédéric Makowiecki	2:27.098	48
49	GTE-Am	#57 Krohn Racing	Tracy Krohn	2:28.677	49
50	LMP1	#8 Peugeot Sport Total	No Time		50
51	LMP1	#13 Rebellion Racing	No Time		51
52	GTE-Pro	#64 Lotus Jetalliance	No Time		52
53	GTE-Am	#72 AF Corse	No Time		53
54	GTE-Pro	#79 JOTA	No Time		54

== Race result ==
Class winners in bold. Cars failing to complete 70% of winner's distance marked as Not Classified (NC).

Pos	Class	No	Team	Drivers	Chassis	Tire	Laps
Pos	Class	No	Team	Drivers	Engine	Tire	Laps
1	**LMP1**	**7**	**(France) Peugeot Sport Total**	**(Austria) Alexander Wurz (United Kingdom) Anthony Davidson (Spain) Marc Gené**	**Peugeot 908**	MI	**161**
1	**LMP1**	**7**	**(France) Peugeot Sport Total**	**(Austria) Alexander Wurz (United Kingdom) Anthony Davidson (Spain) Marc Gené**	**Peugeot HDi 3.7 L Turbo V8 (Diesel)**	MI	**161**
2	LMP1	8	(France) Peugeot Sport Total	(France) Franck Montagny (France) Stéphane Sarrazin (France) Nicolas Minassian	Peugeot 908	MI	161
2	LMP1	8	(France) Peugeot Sport Total	(France) Franck Montagny (France) Stéphane Sarrazin (France) Nicolas Minassian	Peugeot HDi 3.7 L Turbo V8 (Diesel)	MI	161
3	LMP1	3	(Germany) Audi Sport North America	(United Kingdom) Allan McNish (Italy) Rinaldo Capello (Denmark) Tom Kristensen	Audi R18 TDI	MI	160
3	LMP1	3	(Germany) Audi Sport North America	(United Kingdom) Allan McNish (Italy) Rinaldo Capello (Denmark) Tom Kristensen	Audi TDI 3.7 L Turbo V6 (Diesel)	MI	160
4	LMP1	1	(Germany) Audi Sport Team Joest	(Germany) Timo Bernhard (France) Romain Dumas (Germany) Mike Rockenfeller	Audi R18 TDI	MI	159
4	LMP1	1	(Germany) Audi Sport Team Joest	(Germany) Timo Bernhard (France) Romain Dumas (Germany) Mike Rockenfeller	Audi TDI 3.7 L Turbo V6 (Diesel)	MI	159
5	LMP1	2	(Germany) Audi Sport Team Joest	(Germany) André Lotterer (France) Benoît Tréluyer (Switzerland) Marcel Fässler	Audi R18 TDI	MI	158
5	LMP1	2	(Germany) Audi Sport Team Joest	(Germany) André Lotterer (France) Benoît Tréluyer (Switzerland) Marcel Fässler	Audi TDI 3.7 L Turbo V6 (Diesel)	MI	158
6	LMP1	16	(France) Pescarolo Team	(France) Emmanuel Collard (France) Christophe Tinseau (France) Julien Jousse	Pescarolo 01 Evo	MI	156
6	LMP1	16	(France) Pescarolo Team	(France) Emmanuel Collard (France) Christophe Tinseau (France) Julien Jousse	Judd GV5 S2 5.0 L V10	MI	156
7	LMP1	12	(Switzerland) Rebellion Racing	(Switzerland) Neel Jani (France) Nicolas Prost	Lola B10/60	MI	156
7	LMP1	12	(Switzerland) Rebellion Racing	(Switzerland) Neel Jani (France) Nicolas Prost	Toyota RV8KLM 3.4 L V8	MI	156
8	LMP1	9	(France) Peugeot Sport Total	(France) Sébastien Bourdais (Portugal) Pedro Lamy (France) Simon Pagenaud	Peugeot 908	MI	155
8	LMP1	9	(France) Peugeot Sport Total	(France) Sébastien Bourdais (Portugal) Pedro Lamy (France) Simon Pagenaud	Peugeot HDi 3.7 L Turbo V8 (Diesel)	MI	155
9	LMP1	13	(Switzerland) Rebellion Racing	(France) Jean-Christophe Boullion (Italy) Andrea Belicchi	Lola B10/60	MI	155
9	LMP1	13	(Switzerland) Rebellion Racing	(France) Jean-Christophe Boullion (Italy) Andrea Belicchi	Toyota RV8KLM 3.4 L V8	MI	155
10	LMP1	10	(France) Team Oreca-Matmut	(France) Nicolas Lapierre (France) Loïc Duval (France) Olivier Panis	Peugeot 908 HDi FAP	MI	152
10	LMP1	10	(France) Team Oreca-Matmut	(France) Nicolas Lapierre (France) Loïc Duval (France) Olivier Panis	Peugeot HDi 5.5 L Turbo V12 (Diesel)	MI	152
11	**LMP2**	**46**	**(Spain) TDS Racing**	**(Switzerland) Mathias Beche (France) Pierre Thiriet (United Kingdom) Jody Firth**	**Oreca 03**	MI	**150**
11	**LMP2**	**46**	**(Spain) TDS Racing**	**(Switzerland) Mathias Beche (France) Pierre Thiriet (United Kingdom) Jody Firth**	**Nissan VK45DE 4.5 L V8**	MI	**150**
12	LMP2	45	(Belgium) Boutsen Energy Racing	(Austria) Dominik Kraihamer (Belgium) Nicolas de Crem	Oreca 03	D	150
12	LMP2	45	(Belgium) Boutsen Energy Racing	(Austria) Dominik Kraihamer (Belgium) Nicolas de Crem	Nissan VK45DE 4.5 L V8	D	150
13	LMP2	42	(United Kingdom) Strakka Racing	(United Kingdom) Danny Watts (United Kingdom) Jonny Kane (United Kingdom) Nick Leventis	HPD ARX-01d	MI	150
13	LMP2	42	(United Kingdom) Strakka Racing	(United Kingdom) Danny Watts (United Kingdom) Jonny Kane (United Kingdom) Nick Leventis	HPD HR28TT 2.8 L Turbo V6	MI	150
14	LMP2	43	(United Kingdom) RLR msport	(United Kingdom) Barry Gates (United Kingdom) Rob Garofall (United Kingdom) Simon Phillips	MG-Lola EX265	D	147
14	LMP2	43	(United Kingdom) RLR msport	(United Kingdom) Barry Gates (United Kingdom) Rob Garofall (United Kingdom) Simon Phillips	Judd-BMW HK 3.6 L V8	D	147
15	LMP2	26	(France) Signatech Nissan	(France) Franck Mailleux (France) Soheil Ayari (Spain) Lucas Ordoñez	Oreca 03	D	146
15	LMP2	26	(France) Signatech Nissan	(France) Franck Mailleux (France) Soheil Ayari (Spain) Lucas Ordoñez	Nissan VK45DE 4.5 L V8	D	146
16	**GTE; Pro**	**51**	**(Italy) AF Corse**	**(Italy) Giancarlo Fisichella (Italy) Gianmaria Bruni**	**Ferrari 458 Italia GT2**	MI	**144**
16	**GTE; Pro**	**51**	**(Italy) AF Corse**	**(Italy) Giancarlo Fisichella (Italy) Gianmaria Bruni**	**Ferrari 4.5 L V8**	MI	**144**
17	GTE; Pro	89	(Germany) Hankook Team Farnbacher	(Germany) Dominik Farnbacher (Denmark) Allan Simonsen	Ferrari 458 Italia GT2	HK	144
17	GTE; Pro	89	(Germany) Hankook Team Farnbacher	(Germany) Dominik Farnbacher (Denmark) Allan Simonsen	Ferrari 4.5 L V8	HK	144
18	GTE; Pro	56	(Germany) BMW Motorsport	(Germany) Uwe Alzen (United Kingdom) Andy Priaulx	BMW M3 GT2	D	144
18	GTE; Pro	56	(Germany) BMW Motorsport	(Germany) Uwe Alzen (United Kingdom) Andy Priaulx	BMW 4.0 L V8	D	144
19	**FLM**	**95**	**(France) Pegasus Racing**	**(Germany) Mirco Schultis (Germany) Patrick Simon (France) Julien Schell**	**Oreca FLM09**	MI	**144**
19	**FLM**	**95**	**(France) Pegasus Racing**	**(Germany) Mirco Schultis (Germany) Patrick Simon (France) Julien Schell**	**Chevrolet LS3 6.2 L V8**	MI	**144**
20	GTE; Pro	55	(Germany) BMW Motorsport	(Germany) Jörg Müller (Brazil) Augusto Farfus	BMW M3 GT2	D	143
20	GTE; Pro	55	(Germany) BMW Motorsport	(Germany) Jörg Müller (Brazil) Augusto Farfus	BMW 4.0 L V8	D	143
21	GTE; Pro	79	(United Kingdom) JOTA	(United Kingdom) Simon Dolan (United Kingdom) Sam Hancock	Aston Martin V8 Vantage GT2	D	141
21	GTE; Pro	79	(United Kingdom) JOTA	(United Kingdom) Simon Dolan (United Kingdom) Sam Hancock	Aston Martin 4.5 L V8	D	141
22	GTE; Pro	75	(Belgium) Prospeed Competition	(Germany) Marco Holzer (Belgium) Marc Goossens	Porsche 997 GT3-RSR	MI	141
22	GTE; Pro	75	(Belgium) Prospeed Competition	(Germany) Marco Holzer (Belgium) Marc Goossens	Porsche 4.0 L Flat-6	MI	141
23	FLM	93	(United States) Genoa Racing	(Germany) Jens Petersen (Ecuador) Elton Julian (Germany) Christian Zugel	Oreca FLM09	MI	141
23	FLM	93	(United States) Genoa Racing	(Germany) Jens Petersen (Ecuador) Elton Julian (Germany) Christian Zugel	Chevrolet LS3 6.2 L V8	MI	141
24	**GTE; Am**	**67**	**(France) IMSA Performance Matmut**	**(France) Raymond Narac (France) Nicolas Armindo**	**Porsche 997 GT3-RSR**	MI	**140**
24	**GTE; Am**	**67**	**(France) IMSA Performance Matmut**	**(France) Raymond Narac (France) Nicolas Armindo**	**Porsche 4.0 L Flat-6**	MI	**140**
25	GTE; Am	61	(Italy) AF Corse	(Italy) Piergiuseppe Perazzini (Italy) Marco Cioci (Belgium) Stéphane Lémeret	Ferrari F430 GTE	MI	140
25	GTE; Am	61	(Italy) AF Corse	(Italy) Piergiuseppe Perazzini (Italy) Marco Cioci (Belgium) Stéphane Lémeret	Ferrari 4.0 V8	MI	140
26	GTE; Am	50	(France) Larbre Compétition	(France) Patrick Bornhauser (France) Julien Canal (Switzerland) Gabriele Gardel	Chevrolet Corvette C6.R	MI	139
26	GTE; Am	50	(France) Larbre Compétition	(France) Patrick Bornhauser (France) Julien Canal (Switzerland) Gabriele Gardel	Chevrolet 5.5 L V8	MI	139
27	GTE; Am	63	(Germany) Proton Competition	(Germany) Christian Ried (Netherlands) Niek Hommerson	Porsche 997 GT3-RSR	MI	139
27	GTE; Am	63	(Germany) Proton Competition	(Germany) Christian Ried (Netherlands) Niek Hommerson	Porsche 4.0 L Flat-6	MI	139
28	GTE; Am	88	(Germany) Team Felbermayr-Proton	(Austria) Horst Felbermayr, Jr. (United States) Bryce Miller	Porsche 997 GT3-RSR	MI	137
28	GTE; Am	88	(Germany) Team Felbermayr-Proton	(Austria) Horst Felbermayr, Jr. (United States) Bryce Miller	Porsche 4.0 L Flat-6	MI	137
29	GTE; Am	62	(United Kingdom) CRS Racing	(Germany) Pierre Ehret (United Kingdom) Shaun Lynn (New Zealand) Roger Willis	Ferrari F430 GTE	MI	137
29	GTE; Am	62	(United Kingdom) CRS Racing	(Germany) Pierre Ehret (United Kingdom) Shaun Lynn (New Zealand) Roger Willis	Ferrari 4.0 V8	MI	137
30	GTE; Am	70	(Switzerland) Kessel Racing	(Poland) Michał Broniszewski (Austria) Philipp Peter	Ferrari F430 GTE	MI	135
30	GTE; Am	70	(Switzerland) Kessel Racing	(Poland) Michał Broniszewski (Austria) Philipp Peter	Ferrari 4.0 L V8	MI	135
31	GTE; Am	57	(United States) Krohn Racing	(United States) Tracy Krohn (Sweden) Niclas Jönsson	Ferrari F430 GTE	D	134
31	GTE; Am	57	(United States) Krohn Racing	(United States) Tracy Krohn (Sweden) Niclas Jönsson	Ferrari 4.0 V8	D	134
32	LMP2	35	(France) OAK Racing	(France) Patrice Lafargue (France) Fréderic Da Rocha (Italy) Andrea Barlesi	OAK Pescarolo 01	D	134
32	LMP2	35	(France) OAK Racing	(France) Patrice Lafargue (France) Fréderic Da Rocha (Italy) Andrea Barlesi	Judd-BMW HK 3.6 L V8	D	134
33	GTE; Pro	66	(United Kingdom) JMW Motorsport	(United Kingdom) Rob Bell (United Kingdom) James Walker	Ferrari 458 Italia GT2	D	132
33	GTE; Pro	66	(United Kingdom) JMW Motorsport	(United Kingdom) Rob Bell (United Kingdom) James Walker	Ferrari 4.5 L V8	D	132
34	LMP2	40	(Switzerland) Race Performance	(Switzerland) Michel Frey (Switzerland) Ralph Meichtry (France) Marc Rostan	Oreca 03	D	132
34	LMP2	40	(Switzerland) Race Performance	(Switzerland) Michel Frey (Switzerland) Ralph Meichtry (France) Marc Rostan	Judd-BMW HK 3.6 L V8	D	132
35	GTE; Pro	77	(Germany) Team Felbermayr-Proton	(Germany) Marc Lieb (Austria) Richard Lietz	Porsche 997 GT3-RSR	MI	129
35	GTE; Pro	77	(Germany) Team Felbermayr-Proton	(Germany) Marc Lieb (Austria) Richard Lietz	Porsche 4.0 L Flat-6	MI	129
36	FLM	92	(United Kingdom) Neil Garner Motorsport	(United Kingdom) John Hartshorne (United Kingdom) Steve Keating (United Kingdom) Phil Keen	Oreca FLM09	MI	125
36	FLM	92	(United Kingdom) Neil Garner Motorsport	(United Kingdom) John Hartshorne (United Kingdom) Steve Keating (United Kingdom) Phil Keen	Chevrolet LS3 6.2 L V8	MI	125
37	LMP2	41	(United Kingdom) Greaves Motorsport	(France) Gary Chalandon (Saudi Arabia) Karim Ojjeh (United Kingdom) Tom Kimber-Smith	Zytek Z11SN	D	123
37	LMP2	41	(United Kingdom) Greaves Motorsport	(France) Gary Chalandon (Saudi Arabia) Karim Ojjeh (United Kingdom) Tom Kimber-Smith	Nissan VK45DE 4.5 L V8	D	123
38	LMP2	44	(France) Extrême Limite AM Paris	(France) Fabien Rosier (Switzerland) Maurice Basso (Switzerland) Jean-Marc Luco	Norma M200P	D	122
38	LMP2	44	(France) Extrême Limite AM Paris	(France) Fabien Rosier (Switzerland) Maurice Basso (Switzerland) Jean-Marc Luco	Judd-BMW HK 3.6 L V8	D	122
39	LMP1	23	(Italy) MIK Corse	(Spain) Máximo Cortés (Italy) Ferdinando Geri (Italy) Giacomo Piccini	Zytek 09SC - Hybrid	D	174
39	LMP1	23	(Italy) MIK Corse	(Spain) Máximo Cortés (Italy) Ferdinando Geri (Italy) Giacomo Piccini	Zytek ZG348 3.4 L V8	D	174
40	GTE; Pro	64	(Austria) Lotus Jetalliance	(United Kingdom) Martin Rich (Netherlands) Oskar Slingerland	Lotus Evora GTE	MI	119
40	GTE; Pro	64	(Austria) Lotus Jetalliance	(United Kingdom) Martin Rich (Netherlands) Oskar Slingerland	Toyota (Cosworth) 4.0 L V6	MI	119
41	FLM	99	(Monaco) JMB Racing	(France) Manuel Rodrigues (France) Jean-Marc Menahem (France) Olivier Lombard	Oreca FLM09	MI	117
41	FLM	99	(Monaco) JMB Racing	(France) Manuel Rodrigues (France) Jean-Marc Menahem (France) Olivier Lombard	Chevrolet LS3 6.2 L V8	MI	117
DSQ	FLM	91	(Switzerland) Hope Racing	(France) Nicolas Marroc (Italy) Luca Moro (China) Zhang Shan Qi	Oreca FLM09	MI	144
DSQ	FLM	91	(Switzerland) Hope Racing	(France) Nicolas Marroc (Italy) Luca Moro (China) Zhang Shan Qi	Chevrolet LS3 6.2 L V8	MI	144
DNF	GTE; Pro	71	(Italy) AF Corse	(Brazil) Jaime Melo (Finland) Toni Vilander	Ferrari 458 Italia GT2	MI	137
DNF	GTE; Pro	71	(Italy) AF Corse	(Brazil) Jaime Melo (Finland) Toni Vilander	Ferrari 4.5 L V8	MI	137
DNF	GTE; Am	82	(United Kingdom) CRS Racing	(United Kingdom) Phil Quaife (United Kingdom) Adam Christodoulou (Netherlands) Klaas Hummel	Ferrari F430 GTE	MI	137
DNF	GTE; Am	82	(United Kingdom) CRS Racing	(United Kingdom) Phil Quaife (United Kingdom) Adam Christodoulou (Netherlands) Klaas Hummel	Ferrari 4.0 L V8	MI	137
NC	GTE; Am	60	(United Arab Emirates) Gulf AMR Middle East	(France) Fabien Giroix (Germany) Roald Goethe (United Kingdom) Michael Wainwright	Aston Martin V8 Vantage GT2	D	108
NC	GTE; Am	60	(United Arab Emirates) Gulf AMR Middle East	(France) Fabien Giroix (Germany) Roald Goethe (United Kingdom) Michael Wainwright	Aston Martin 4.5 L V8	D	108
DNF	LMP1	20	(Portugal) Quifel ASM Team	(Portugal) Miguel Amaral (France) Olivier Pla	Zytek 09SC	D	106
DNF	LMP1	20	(Portugal) Quifel ASM Team	(Portugal) Miguel Amaral (France) Olivier Pla	Zytek ZG348 3.4 L V8	D	106
DNF	GTE; Am	72	(Italy) AF Corse	(United States) Robert Kauffman (Portugal) Rui Águas	Ferrari F430 GTE	MI	105
DNF	GTE; Am	72	(Italy) AF Corse	(United States) Robert Kauffman (Portugal) Rui Águas	Ferrari 4.0 V8	MI	105
DNF	GTE; Pro	59	(France) Luxury Racing	(Monaco) Stéphane Ortelli (France) Frédéric Makowiecki	Ferrari 458 Italia GT2	MI	64
DNF	GTE; Pro	59	(France) Luxury Racing	(Monaco) Stéphane Ortelli (France) Frédéric Makowiecki	Ferrari 4.5 L V8	MI	64
DNF	LMP2	39	(Argentina) Pecom Racing	(Argentina) Matías Russo (Argentina) Luís Pérez Companc (Germany) Pierre Kaffer	Lola B11/40	MI	60
DNF	LMP2	39	(Argentina) Pecom Racing	(Argentina) Matías Russo (Argentina) Luís Pérez Companc (Germany) Pierre Kaffer	Judd-BMW HK 3.6 L V8	MI	60
DNF	LMP2	33	(United States) Level 5 Motorsports	(United States) Scott Tucker (France) Christophe Bouchut (Portugal) João Barbosa	Lola B08/80	MI	59
DNF	LMP2	33	(United States) Level 5 Motorsports	(United States) Scott Tucker (France) Christophe Bouchut (Portugal) João Barbosa	HPD HR28TT 2.8 L Turbo V6	MI	59
DNF	GTE; Pro	65	(Austria) Lotus Jetalliance	(United Kingdom) James Rossiter (United Kingdom) Johnny Mowlem (Switzerland) Jonathan Hirschi	Lotus Evora GTE	MI	21
DNF	GTE; Pro	65	(Austria) Lotus Jetalliance	(United Kingdom) James Rossiter (United Kingdom) Johnny Mowlem (Switzerland) Jonathan Hirschi	Toyota (Cosworth) 4.0 L V6	MI	21
DNF	GTE; Pro	76	(France) IMSA Performance Matmut	(France) Patrick Pilet (Germany) Wolf Henzler	Porsche 997 GT3-RSR	MI	16
DNF	GTE; Pro	76	(France) IMSA Performance Matmut	(France) Patrick Pilet (Germany) Wolf Henzler	Porsche 4.0 L Flat-6	MI	16
DNF	GTE; Pro	58	(France) Luxury Racing	(France) Anthony Beltoise (France) François Jakubowski (Switzerland) Jean-Denis Délétraz	Ferrari 458 Italia GT2	MI	4
DNF	GTE; Pro	58	(France) Luxury Racing	(France) Anthony Beltoise (France) François Jakubowski (Switzerland) Jean-Denis Délétraz	Ferrari 4.5 L V8	MI	4
DNS	LMP1	15	(France) OAK Racing	(France) Matthieu Lahaye (France) Pierre Ragues (France) Guillaume Moreau	OAK Pescarolo 01	D	-
DNS	LMP1	15	(France) OAK Racing	(France) Matthieu Lahaye (France) Pierre Ragues (France) Guillaume Moreau	Judd DB 3.4 L V8	D	-
DNS	LMP2	36	(United Kingdom) RML	(United Kingdom) Mike Newton (Brazil) Thomas Erdos (United Kingdom) Ben Collins	HPD ARX-01d	D	-
DNS	LMP2	36	(United Kingdom) RML	(United Kingdom) Mike Newton (Brazil) Thomas Erdos (United Kingdom) Ben Collins	HPD HR28TT 2.8 L Turbo V6	D	-

Le Mans Series
Previous race: 6 Hours of Castellet	2011 season	Next race: 6 Hours of Imola
