= 2011 6 Hours of Castellet =

Circuit Paul Ricard 1A-V2 (pit road was different before 2019

The 2011 6 Hours of Castellet (6 Heures du Castellet) was the opening round of the 2011 Le Mans Series season. It took place at Circuit Paul Ricard on April 3, 2011. It was also the first Le Mans Series race with the two new GT classes, GTE Pro and GTE Am, contesting the event after the demise of the GT1 class.

== Qualifying result ==
Pole position winners in each class are marked in bold.

Pos	Class	Team	Driver	Lap Time	Grid
1	**LMP1**	**No.12 Rebellion Racing**	**Neel Jani**	**1:46.783**	**1**
2	LMP1	No.16 Pescarolo Team	Emmanuel Collard	1:47.025	34
3	LMP1	No.20 Quifel-ASM Team	Olivier Pla	1:47.231	2
4	LMP1	No.13 Rebellion Racing	Jean-Christophe Boullion	1:48.491	3
5	**LMP2**	**No.46 TDS Racing**	**Mathias Beche**	**1:48.928**	**4**
6	LMP2	No.45 Boutsen Energy Racing	Dominik Kraihamer	1:49.692	5
7	LMP2	No.41 Greaves Motorsport	Tom Kimber-Smith	1:50.008	6
8	LMP2	No.40 Race Performance	Thor-Christian Ebbesvik	1:50.356	7
9	LMP2	No.39 PeCom Racing	Matías Russo	1:51.744	8
10	LMP2	No.44 Extrême Limite AM Paris	Fabien Rosier	1:52.158	9
11	LMP1	No.009 Aston Martin Racing	Stefan Mücke	1:52.267	10
12	LMP2	No.43 RLR msport	Rob Garofall	1:53.414	11
13	LMP2	No.42 Strakka Racing	Danny Watts	1:53.582	12
14	**FLM**	**No.91 Hope Polevision Racing**	**Nicolas Marroc**	**1:53.659**	**13**
15	FLM	No.93 Genoa Racing	Elton Julian	1:54.044	14
16	FLM	No.92 Neil Garner Motorsport	Phil Keen	1:54.081	15
17	FLM	No.95 Pegasus Racing	Patrick Simon	1:55.829	16
18	FLM	No.99 JMB Racing	Nicolas Misslin	1:56.806	17
19	**GTE-Pro**	**No.51 AF Corse**	**Gianmaria Bruni**	**1:58.522**	**18**
20	GTE-Pro	No.86 Young Driver AMR	Tomáš Enge	1:58.773	19
21	GTE-Pro	No.66 JMW Motorsport	Rob Bell	1:59.119	20
22	GTE-Pro	No.71 AF Corse	Toni Vilander	1:59.144	21
23	GTE-Pro	No.89 Hankook Team Farnbacher	Allan Simonsen	1:59.244	22
24	GTE-Pro	No.75 Prospeed Competition	Marco Holzer	1:59.244	23
25	**GTE-Am**	**No.67 IMSA Performance Matmut**	**Nicolas Armindo**	**1:59.370**	**24**
26	GTE-Pro	No.77 Team Felbermayr-Proton	Richard Lietz	1:59.455	25
27	GTE-Pro	No.76 IMSA Performance Matmut	Patrick Pilet	1:59.457	26
28	GTE-Pro	No.79 JOTA	Sam Hancock	2:00.336	27
29	GTE-Am	No.88 Team Felbermayr-Proton	Horst Felbermayr Jr.	2:00.354	28
30	GTE-Am	No.61 AF Corse	Marco Cioci	2:00.470	29
31	GTE-Am	No.70 Kessel Racing	Philipp Peter	2:00.698	30
32	GTE-Am	No.82 CRS Racing	Adam Christodoulou	2:01.137	31
33	GTE-Am	No.72 AF Corse	Rui Águas	2:01.691	32
34	LMP2	No.36 RML	No Time		33

Note: the No. 16 Pescarolo Team was demoted to the back of the grid due to a ride height infringement in qualifying.

== Race ==
The race got off to a controversial start when the pace car did not return to the pits when the green lights came on. The front running LMPs slowed down but some of the GT cars could not react fast enough, resulting in all three GTE Pro class Porsches getting heavily damaged and retired. The GTE Am class IMSA Performance Matmut Porsche and GTE Pro JOTA Aston Martin were also caught in the carnage. The race was won overall by Pescarolo Team after their first race since 2009 after their financial troubles in 2010. LMP2 was won by Greaves Motorsport, Pegasus Racing took the FLM victory. JMW Motorsport took GTE Pro victory after a hard fought battle with the No. 51 AF Corse Ferrari towards the end. Team Felbermayr-Proton won in the GTE Am class.

=== Race result ===
Class winners in bold. Cars failing to complete 70% of winner's distance marked as Not Classified (NC).

Pos	Class	No	Team	Drivers	Chassis	Tyre	Laps
Pos	Class	No	Team	Drivers	Engine	Tyre	Laps
1	**LMP1**	**16**	**(France) Pescarolo Team**	**(France) Emmanuel Collard (France) Christophe Tinseau (France) Julien Jousse**	**Pescarolo 01 Evo**	MI	**185**
1	**LMP1**	**16**	**(France) Pescarolo Team**	**(France) Emmanuel Collard (France) Christophe Tinseau (France) Julien Jousse**	**Judd GV5 S2 5.0 L V10**	MI	**185**
2	LMP1	13	(Switzerland) Rebellion Racing	(France) Jean-Christophe Boullion (Italy) Andrea Belicchi	Lola B10/60	MI	184
2	LMP1	13	(Switzerland) Rebellion Racing	(France) Jean-Christophe Boullion (Italy) Andrea Belicchi	Toyota RV8KLM 3.4 L V8	MI	184
3	**LMP2**	**41**	**(United Kingdom) Greaves Motorsport**	**(France) Gary Chalandon (Saudi Arabia) Karim Ojjeh (United Kingdom) Tom Kimber-Smith**	**Zytek Z11SN**	D	**179**
3	**LMP2**	**41**	**(United Kingdom) Greaves Motorsport**	**(France) Gary Chalandon (Saudi Arabia) Karim Ojjeh (United Kingdom) Tom Kimber-Smith**	**Nissan VK45DE 4.5 L V8**	D	**179**
4	LMP2	39	(Argentina) Pecom Racing	(Argentina) Matías Russo (Argentina) Luís Pérez Companc (Germany) Pierre Kaffer	Lola B11/40	MI	179
4	LMP2	39	(Argentina) Pecom Racing	(Argentina) Matías Russo (Argentina) Luís Pérez Companc (Germany) Pierre Kaffer	Judd-BMW HK 3.6 L V8	MI	179
5	LMP2	42	(United Kingdom) Strakka Racing	(United Kingdom) Danny Watts (United Kingdom) Jonny Kane (United Kingdom) Nick Leventis	HPD ARX-01d	MI	177
5	LMP2	42	(United Kingdom) Strakka Racing	(United Kingdom) Danny Watts (United Kingdom) Jonny Kane (United Kingdom) Nick Leventis	HPD HR28TT 2.8 L Turbo V6	MI	177
6	LMP2	45	(Belgium) Boutsen Energy Racing	(Austria) Dominik Kraihamer (Belgium) Nicolas de Crem	Oreca 03	D	175
6	LMP2	45	(Belgium) Boutsen Energy Racing	(Austria) Dominik Kraihamer (Belgium) Nicolas de Crem	Nissan VK45DE 4.5 L V8	D	175
7	LMP1	12	(Switzerland) Rebellion Racing	(Switzerland) Neel Jani (France) Nicolas Prost	Lola B10/60	MI	175
7	LMP1	12	(Switzerland) Rebellion Racing	(Switzerland) Neel Jani (France) Nicolas Prost	Toyota RV8KLM 3.4 L V8	MI	175
8	LMP1	20	(Portugal) Quifel ASM Team	(Portugal) Miguel Amaral (France) Olivier Pla	Zytek 09SC	D	174
8	LMP1	20	(Portugal) Quifel ASM Team	(Portugal) Miguel Amaral (France) Olivier Pla	Zytek ZG348 3.4 L V8	D	174
9	LMP2	43	(United Kingdom) RLR msport	(United Kingdom) Barry Gates (United Kingdom) Rob Garofall (United Kingdom) Simon Phillips	MG-Lola EX265	D	174
9	LMP2	43	(United Kingdom) RLR msport	(United Kingdom) Barry Gates (United Kingdom) Rob Garofall (United Kingdom) Simon Phillips	Judd-BMW HK 3.6 L V8	D	174
10	LMP2	40	(Switzerland) Race Performance	(Switzerland) Michel Frey (Switzerland) Ralph Meichtry (Norway) Thor-Christian Ebbesvik	Oreca 03	D	174
10	LMP2	40	(Switzerland) Race Performance	(Switzerland) Michel Frey (Switzerland) Ralph Meichtry (Norway) Thor-Christian Ebbesvik	Judd-BMW HK 3.6 L V8	D	174
11	LMP2	36	(United Kingdom) RML	(United Kingdom) Mike Newton (Brazil) Thomas Erdos (United Kingdom) Ben Collins	HPD ARX-01d	D	173
11	LMP2	36	(United Kingdom) RML	(United Kingdom) Mike Newton (Brazil) Thomas Erdos (United Kingdom) Ben Collins	HPD HR28TT 2.8 L Turbo V6	D	173
12	**FLM**	**95**	**(France) Pegasus Racing**	**(Germany) Mirco Schultis (Germany) Patrick Simon (France) Julien Schell**	**Oreca FLM09**	MI	**170**
12	**FLM**	**95**	**(France) Pegasus Racing**	**(Germany) Mirco Schultis (Germany) Patrick Simon (France) Julien Schell**	**Chevrolet LS3 6.2 L V8**	MI	**170**
13	FLM	93	(United States) Genoa Racing	(Germany) Jens Petersen (Ecuador) Elton Julian (Germany) Christian Zugel	Oreca FLM09	MI	170
13	FLM	93	(United States) Genoa Racing	(Germany) Jens Petersen (Ecuador) Elton Julian (Germany) Christian Zugel	Chevrolet LS3 6.2 L V8	MI	170
14	**GTE; Pro**	**66**	**(United Kingdom) JMW Motorsport**	**(United Kingdom) Rob Bell (United Kingdom) James Walker**	**Ferrari 458 Italia GT2**	D	**170**
14	**GTE; Pro**	**66**	**(United Kingdom) JMW Motorsport**	**(United Kingdom) Rob Bell (United Kingdom) James Walker**	**Ferrari 4.5 L V8**	D	**170**
15	GTE; Pro	51	(Italy) AF Corse	(Italy) Giancarlo Fisichella (Italy) Gianmaria Bruni	Ferrari 458 Italia GT2	MI	169
15	GTE; Pro	51	(Italy) AF Corse	(Italy) Giancarlo Fisichella (Italy) Gianmaria Bruni	Ferrari 4.5 L V8	MI	169
16	LMP2	44	(France) Extrême Limite AM Paris	(France) Fabien Rosier (Switzerland) Maurice Basso (Switzerland) Jean-Marc Luco	Norma M200P	D	169
16	LMP2	44	(France) Extrême Limite AM Paris	(France) Fabien Rosier (Switzerland) Maurice Basso (Switzerland) Jean-Marc Luco	Judd-BMW HK 3.6 L V8	D	169
17	**GTE; Am**	**88**	**(Germany) Team Felbermayr-Proton**	**(Austria) Horst Felbermayr Sr. (Austria) Horst Felbermayr Jr. (Germany) Christian Ried**	**Porsche 997 GT3-RSR**	MI	**167**
17	**GTE; Am**	**88**	**(Germany) Team Felbermayr-Proton**	**(Austria) Horst Felbermayr Sr. (Austria) Horst Felbermayr Jr. (Germany) Christian Ried**	**Porsche 4.0 L Flat-6**	MI	**167**
18	GTE; Am	61	(Italy) AF Corse	(Italy) Piergiuseppe Perazzini (Italy) Marco Cioci (Belgium) Stéphane Lémeret	Ferrari F430 GTE	MI	167
18	GTE; Am	61	(Italy) AF Corse	(Italy) Piergiuseppe Perazzini (Italy) Marco Cioci (Belgium) Stéphane Lémeret	Ferrari 4.0 V8	MI	167
19	GTE; Am	70	(Switzerland) Kessel Racing	(Poland) Michał Broniszewski (Austria) Philipp Peter	Ferrari F430 GTE	MI	167
19	GTE; Am	70	(Switzerland) Kessel Racing	(Poland) Michał Broniszewski (Austria) Philipp Peter	Ferrari 4.0 L V8	MI	167
20	GTE; Am	82	(United Kingdom) CRS Racing	(United Kingdom) Phil Quaife (United Kingdom) Adam Christodoulou (Netherlands) Klaas Hummel	Ferrari F430 GTE	MI	166
20	GTE; Am	82	(United Kingdom) CRS Racing	(United Kingdom) Phil Quaife (United Kingdom) Adam Christodoulou (Netherlands) Klaas Hummel	Ferrari 4.0 L V8	MI	166
21	GTE; Pro	89	(Germany) Hankook Team Farnbacher	(Germany) Dominik Farnbacher (Denmark) Allan Simonsen	Ferrari 458 Italia GT2	HK	163
21	GTE; Pro	89	(Germany) Hankook Team Farnbacher	(Germany) Dominik Farnbacher (Denmark) Allan Simonsen	Ferrari 4.5 L V8	HK	163
22	GTE; Am	72	(Italy) AF Corse	(United States) Robert Kuaffman (Portugal) Rui Águas (Italy) Giuseppe Cirò	Ferrari F430 GTE	MI	163
22	GTE; Am	72	(Italy) AF Corse	(United States) Robert Kuaffman (Portugal) Rui Águas (Italy) Giuseppe Cirò	Ferrari 4.0 V8	MI	163
23	GTE; Pro	71	(Italy) AF Corse	(Brazil) Jaime Melo (Finland) Toni Vilander	Ferrari 458 Italia GT2	MI	161
23	GTE; Pro	71	(Italy) AF Corse	(Brazil) Jaime Melo (Finland) Toni Vilander	Ferrari 4.5 L V8	MI	161
24	FLM	92	(United Kingdom) Neil Garner Motorsport	(United Kingdom) John Hartshorne (United Kingdom) Steve Keating (United Kingdom) Phil Keen	Oreca FLM09	MI	157
24	FLM	92	(United Kingdom) Neil Garner Motorsport	(United Kingdom) John Hartshorne (United Kingdom) Steve Keating (United Kingdom) Phil Keen	Chevrolet LS3 6.2 L V8	MI	157
25	FLM	99	(Monaco) JMB Racing	(France) Manuel Rodrigues (France) Jean-Marc Menahem (France) Nicolas Misslin	Oreca FLM09	MI	142
25	FLM	99	(Monaco) JMB Racing	(France) Manuel Rodrigues (France) Jean-Marc Menahem (France) Nicolas Misslin	Chevrolet LS3 6.2 L V8	MI	142
26 DNF	GTE; Pro	86	(Germany) Young Driver AMR	(Czech Republic) Tomáš Enge (Germany) Alex Müller (Denmark) Christoffer Nygaard	Aston Martin V8 Vantage GT2	MI	140
26 DNF	GTE; Pro	86	(Germany) Young Driver AMR	(Czech Republic) Tomáš Enge (Germany) Alex Müller (Denmark) Christoffer Nygaard	Aston Martin 4.5 L V8	MI	140
27	GTE; Am	67	(France) IMSA Performance Matmut	(France) Raymond Narac (France) Nicolas Armindo	Porsche 997 GT3-RSR	MI	137
27	GTE; Am	67	(France) IMSA Performance Matmut	(France) Raymond Narac (France) Nicolas Armindo	Porsche 4.0 L Flat-6	MI	137
28 NC	GTE; Pro	79	(United Kingdom) JOTA	(United Kingdom) Simon Dolan (United Kingdom) Sam Hancock	Aston Martin V8 Vantage GT2	D	105
28 NC	GTE; Pro	79	(United Kingdom) JOTA	(United Kingdom) Simon Dolan (United Kingdom) Sam Hancock	Aston Martin 4.5 L V8	D	105
29 NC	LMP1	009	(United Kingdom) Aston Martin Racing	(Germany) Stefan Mücke (United Kingdom) Darren Turner (Switzerland) Harold Primat	Aston Martin AMR-One	MI	96
29 NC	LMP1	009	(United Kingdom) Aston Martin Racing	(Germany) Stefan Mücke (United Kingdom) Darren Turner (Switzerland) Harold Primat	Aston Martin 2.0 L Turbo I6	MI	96
30 DNF	FLM	91	(Switzerland) Hope Polevision Racing	(France) Nicolas Marroc (Italy) Luca Moro (China) Zhang Shan Qi	Oreca FLM09	MI	93
30 DNF	FLM	91	(Switzerland) Hope Polevision Racing	(France) Nicolas Marroc (Italy) Luca Moro (China) Zhang Shan Qi	Chevrolet LS3 6.2 L V8	MI	93
31 DNF	LMP2	46	(Spain) TDS Racing	(Switzerland) Mathias Beche (France) Pierre Thiriet (United Kingdom) Jody Firth	Oreca 03	MI	91
31 DNF	LMP2	46	(Spain) TDS Racing	(Switzerland) Mathias Beche (France) Pierre Thiriet (United Kingdom) Jody Firth	Nissan VK45DE 4.5 L V8	MI	91
32 DNF	GTE; Pro	76	(France) IMSA Performance Matmut	(France) Patrick Pilet (Germany) Wolf Henzler	Porsche 997 GT3-RSR	MI	2
32 DNF	GTE; Pro	76	(France) IMSA Performance Matmut	(France) Patrick Pilet (Germany) Wolf Henzler	Porsche 4.0 L Flat-6	MI	2
33 DNF	GTE; Pro	75	(Belgium) Prospeed Competition	(Germany) Marco Holzer (Belgium) Marc Goossens	Porsche 997 GT3-RSR	MI	0
33 DNF	GTE; Pro	75	(Belgium) Prospeed Competition	(Germany) Marco Holzer (Belgium) Marc Goossens	Porsche 4.0 L Flat-6	MI	0
34 DNF	GTE; Pro	77	(Germany) Team Felbermayr-Proton	(Germany) Marc Lieb (Austria) Richard Lietz	Porsche 997 GT3-RSR	MI	0
34 DNF	GTE; Pro	77	(Germany) Team Felbermayr-Proton	(Germany) Marc Lieb (Austria) Richard Lietz	Porsche 4.0 L Flat-6	MI	0

Le Mans Series
Previous race: none	2011 season	Next race: 1000 km of Spa
