= 2011 Le Mans Series =

Motorsport season

Seasons
- ← 2010 2012 →

The 2011 Le Mans Series was the eighth season of the Automobile Club de l'Ouest's Le Mans Series. The series began on 3 April with the 6 Hours of Castellet and ended after five rounds on 25 September. It is a series for Le Mans Prototype and Grand Touring style cars broken into 4 classes. LMP1, LMP2 and FLM are retained from last year, while GT1 is removed, and GT2 split into GTE-Pro and GTE-Am.

With the launch of the Intercontinental Le Mans Cup, several LMP1 teams left the Le Mans Series, such as Peugeot Sport, Audi Sport, Aston Martin Racing and Oreca. This was the last season of the LMP1 in the championship.

== Schedule ==
On 29 November 2010, the ACO announced a 5-race calendar, plus an official test session at Circuit Paul Ricard. The initial calendar included a race in Portugal, with the circuit to be announced. Three events; Spa, Imola, and Silverstone; will also be part of the 2011 Intercontinental Le Mans Cup calendar.

Rnd	Race	Circuit	Date
–	Official Test Session	Circuit Paul Ricard, Le Castellet, France	11–12 March
1	6 Hours of Castellet	Circuit Paul Ricard, Le Castellet, France	3 April
2	1000 km of Spa-Francorchamps	Circuit de Spa-Francorchamps, Belgium	7 May
3	6 Hours of Imola	Autodromo Enzo e Dino Ferrari, Imola, Italy	3 July
4	6 Hours of Silverstone	Silverstone Circuit, United Kingdom	11 September
5	6 Hours of Estoril	Autódromo do Estoril, Portugal	25 September

== Season results ==
Overall winner in bold.

Rnd.	Circuit	LMP1 Winning Team	LMP2 Winning Team	FLM Winning Team	GTE Pro Winning Team	GTE Am Winning Team	Results
Rnd.	Circuit	LMP1 Winning Drivers	LMP2 Winning Drivers	FLM Winning Drivers	GTE Pro Winning Drivers	GTE Am Winning Drivers	Results
1	Paul Ricard	(France) **No. 16 Pescarolo Team**	(United Kingdom) No. 41 Greaves Motorsport	(France) No. 95 Pegasus Racing	(United Kingdom) No. 66 JMW Motorsport	(Germany) No. 88 Team Felbermayr-Proton	Results
1	Paul Ricard	(France) **Emmanuel Collard** **(France) Christophe Tinseau** **(France) Julien Jousse**	(France) Gary Chalandon (Saudi Arabia) Karim Ojjeh (United Kingdom) Tom Kimber-Smith	(Germany) Mirco Schultis (Germany) Patrick Simon (France) Julien Schell	(United Kingdom) Rob Bell (United Kingdom) James Walker	(Austria) Horst Felbermayr Sr. (Austria) Horst Felbermayr Jr. (Germany) Christian Ried	Results
2	Spa	(France) **No. 7 Peugeot Sport Total**	(Spain) No. 46 TDS Racing	(France) No. 95 Pegasus Racing	(Italy) No. 51 AF Corse	(France) No. 67 IMSA Performance Matmut	Results
2	Spa	(Austria) **Alexander Wurz** **(United Kingdom) Anthony Davidson** **(Spain) Marc Gené**	(Switzerland) Mathias Beche (France) Pierre Thiriet (United Kingdom) Jody Firth	(Germany) Mirco Schultis (Germany) Patrick Simon (France) Julien Schell	(Italy) Giancarlo Fisichella (Italy) Gianmaria Bruni	(France) Raymond Narac (France) Nicolas Armindo	Results
3	Imola	(France) **No. 7 Peugeot Sport Total**	(United Kingdom) No. 41 Greaves Motorsport	(Monaco) No. 99 JMB Racing	(Italy) No. 71 AF Corse	(France) No. 67 IMSA Performance Matmut	Results
3	Imola	(France) **Sébastien Bourdais** **(United Kingdom) Anthony Davidson**	(France) Olivier Lombard (Saudi Arabia) Karim Ojjeh (United Kingdom) Tom Kimber-Smith	(United States) Chapman Ducote (Canada) Kyle Marcelli (France) Nicolas Marroc	(Brazil) Jaime Melo (Finland) Toni Vilander	(France) Nicolas Armindo (France) Raymond Narac	Results
4	Silverstone	(France) **No. 7 Peugeot Sport Total**	(United Kingdom) No. 41 Greaves Motorsport	(France) No. 95 Pegasus Racing	(Italy) No. 51 AF Corse	(France) No. 67 IMSA Performance Matmut	Results
4	Silverstone	(France) **Sébastien Bourdais** **(France) Simon Pagenaud**	(France) Olivier Lombard (Saudi Arabia) Karim Ojjeh (United Kingdom) Tom Kimber-Smith	(Germany) Mirco Schultis (Germany) Patrick Simon (France) Julien Schell	(Italy) Giancarlo Fisichella (Italy) Gianmaria Bruni	(France) Nicolas Armindo (France) Raymond Narac	Results
5	Estoril	(France) **No. 16 Pescarolo Team**	(Spain) No. 46 TDS Racing	(France) No. 95 Pegasus Racing	(United Kingdom) No. 66 JMW Motorsport	(France) No. 67 IMSA Performance Matmut	Results
5	Estoril	(France) **Emmanuel Collard** **(France) Christophe Tinseau** **(France) Julien Jousse**	(Switzerland) Mathias Beche (France) Pierre Thiriet (United Kingdom) Jody Firth	(Germany) Mirco Schultis (Germany) Patrick Simon (France) Julien Schell	(United Kingdom) Rob Bell (United Kingdom) James Walker	(France) Nicolas Armindo (France) Raymond Narac	Results

== Championship Standings ==
Points are awarded to all race finishers, with unclassified entries failing to complete 70% of the race distance or entries failing to reach the finish not earning championship points. One bonus point is awarded for winning pole position (denoted by bold), and a further bonus is awarded (denoted by parenthesis). Entries which change an engine prior to the required two race minimum are penalized two points, with a four-point penalty for every subsequent engine change.

Points System
Race Distance	Position												Pole Position
Race Distance	1st	2nd	3rd	4th	5th	6th	7th	8th	9th	10th	11th	12th And Lower	Pole Position
1000 km	15	13	11	9	8	7	6	5	4	3	2	1	1

== Teams Championships ==
The top two finishers in the LMP1, LMP2, GTE Pro, and GTE Am championships earn automatic entry to the 2012 24 Hours of Le Mans.

=== LMP1 Standings ===
Pos	Team	Chassis	Engine	LEC (France)	SPA (Belgium)	IMO (Italy)	SIL (United Kingdom)	EST (Portugal)	Total
1	(Switzerland) Rebellion Racing	Lola B10/60	Toyota RV8KLM 3.4 L V8	2	7	5	4	2	51
2	(France) Pescarolo Team	Pescarolo 01 Evo	Judd GV5 5.0 L V10	1	6	7	6	1	50
3	(Portugal) Quifel-ASM Team	Zytek 09SC	Zytek ZG348 3.4 L V8	4	Ret				9
4	(Italy) MIK Corse	Zytek 09SC Hybrid	Zytek ZG348 3.4 L V8		11	Ret			2

=== LMP2 Standings ===
Pos	Team	Chassis	Engine	LEC (France)	SPA (Belgium)	IMO (Italy)	SIL (United Kingdom)	EST (Portugal)	Total
1	(United Kingdom) Greaves Motorsport	Zytek Z11SN	Nissan VK45DE 4.5 L V8	1	8	1	1	2	64
2	(United Kingdom) Strakka Racing	HPD ARX-01d	HPD HR28TT 2.8 L Turbo V6	3	3	6	8	6	43
3	(Spain) TDS Racing	Oreca 03	Nissan VK45DE 4.5 L V8	Ret	1	7	Ret	1	38
4	(Belgium) Boutsen Energy Racing	Oreca 03	Nissan VK45DE 4.5 L V8	4	2	10	3	Ret	36
5	(Switzerland) Race Performance	Oreca 03	Judd-BMW HK 3.6 L V8	6	7	Ret	2	4	35
6	(United Kingdom) RLR MSport	MG-Lola EX265	Judd-BMW HK 3.6 L V8	5	4	Ret	5	5	33
7	(France) Extrême Limite AM Paris	Norma M200P	Judd-BMW HK 3.6 L V8	8	9	8		3	25
8	(Argentina) Pecom Racing	Lola B11/40	Judd-BMW HK 3.6 L V8	2	Ret	4	Ret	Ret	22
9	(United Kingdom) RML	HPD ARX-01d	HPD HR28TT 2.8 L Turbo V6	7	DNS	11	4		17

=== FLM Standings ===
All teams in the Formula Le Mans category utilize the Oreca FLM09 chassis and General Motors 6.3 L V8.

Pos	Team	LEC (France)	SPA (Belgium)	IMO (Italy)	SIL (United Kingdom)	EST (Portugal)	Total
1	(France) Pegasus Racing	1	1	2	1	1	73
2	(Monaco) JMB Racing	4	4	1	3	2	58
3	(United States) Genoa Racing	2	2	4	2		48
4	(United Kingdom) Neil Garner Motorsport	3	3		4	3	45
5	(Switzerland) Hope Polevision Racing	Ret	DSQ	3			12

=== LM GTE Pro Standings ===
Pos	Team	Chassis	Engine	LEC (France)	SPA (Belgium)	IMO (Italy)	SIL (United Kingdom)	EST (Portugal)	Total
1	(Italy) AF Corse	Ferrari 458 Italia GT2	Ferrari 4.5 L V8	2	(1)	(1)	1	Ret	61
2	(United Kingdom) JMW Motorsport	Ferrari 458 Italia GT2	Ferrari 4.5 L V8	1	(7)	Ret	(9)	(1)	46
3	(Germany) Team Felbermayr-Proton	Porsche 997 GT3-RSR	Porsche 4.0 L Flat-6	Ret	(8)	(4)	(3)	(2)	44
4	(Germany) Hankook Team Farnbacher	Ferrari 458 Italia GT2	Ferrari 4.5 L V8	3	(2)	Ret	(8)	Ret	32
5	(France) IMSA Performance Matmut	Porsche 997 GT3-RSR	Porsche 4.0 L Flat-6	Ret	Ret	5	(7)	(3)	27
6	(Belgium) Prospeed Competition	Porsche 997 GT3-RSR	Porsche 4.0 L Flat-6	Ret	6	(6)	(5)	Ret	25
7	(United Kingdom) Jota	Aston Martin V8 Vantage GT2	Aston Martin 4.5 L V8	NC	5	7	11	5	24

=== LM GTE Am Standings ===
Pos	Team	Chassis	Engine	LEC (France)	SPA (Belgium)	IMO (Italy)	SIL (United Kingdom)	EST (Portugal)	Total
1	(France) IMSA Performance Matmut	Porsche 997 GT3-RSR	Porsche 4.0 L Flat-6	(6)	(1)	1	(1)	(1)	75
2	(Italy) AF Corse	Ferrari F430 GT2	Ferrari 4.0 L V8	(2)	(2)	3	(5)	(4)	58
3	(Germany) Team Felbermayr-Proton	Porsche 997 GT3-RSR	Porsche 4.0 L Flat-6	1	(5)	NC	(6)	(3)	44
4	(United Kingdom) CRS Racing	Ferrari F430 GT2	Ferrari 4.0 L V8	4	Ret	(4)	(9)	2	36

== Drivers Championships ==
=== LMP1 Standings ===
Pos	Driver	Team	LEC (France)	SPA (Belgium)	IMO (Italy)	SIL (United Kingdom)	EST (Portugal)	Total
1	(France) Emmanuel Collard	(France) Pescarolo Team	1	6	7	6	1	50
1	(France) Julien Jousse	(France) Pescarolo Team	1	6	7	6	1	50
2	(Italy) Andrea Belicchi	(Switzerland) Rebellion Racing	2	9	5	4	2	47
2	(France) Jean-Christophe Boullion	(Switzerland) Rebellion Racing	2	9	5	4	2	47
3	(Switzerland) Neel Jani	(Switzerland) Rebellion Racing	3	7	6	Ret	3	37
3	(France) Nicolas Prost	(Switzerland) Rebellion Racing	3	7	6	Ret	3	37
4	(France) Christophe Tinseau	(France) Pescarolo Team	1	6	7	6		35
5	(Portugal) Miguel Amaral	(Portugal) Quifel ASM Team	4	Ret				9
5	(France) Olivier Pla	(Portugal) Quifel ASM Team	4	Ret				9
6	(Italy) Ferdinando Geri	(Italy) MIK Corse		11	Ret			2
6	(Italy) Giacomo Piccini	(Italy) MIK Corse		11	Ret			2
6	(Spain) Máximo Cortés	(Italy) MIK Corse		11	Ret			2

=== LMP2 Standings ===
Pos	Driver	Team	LEC (France)	SPA (Belgium)	IMO (Italy)	SIL (United Kingdom)	EST (Portugal)	Total
1	(Saudi Arabia) Karim Ojjeh	(United Kingdom) Greaves Motorsport	1	8	1	1	2	64
1	(United Kingdom) Tom Kimber-Smith	(United Kingdom) Greaves Motorsport	1	8	1	1	2	64
2	(France) Olivier Lombard	(United Kingdom) Greaves Motorsport			1	1	2	44
3	(United Kingdom) Danny Watts	(United Kingdom) Strakka Racing	3	3	6	8	6	43
3	(United Kingdom) Jonny Kane	(United Kingdom) Strakka Racing	3	3	6	8	6	43
3	(United Kingdom) Nick Leventis	(United Kingdom) Strakka Racing	3	3	6	8	6	43
4	(United Kingdom) Jody Firth	(Spain) TDS Racing	Ret	1	7	Ret	1	38
4	(Switzerland) Mathias Beche	(Spain) TDS Racing	Ret	1	7	Ret	1	38
4	(France) Pierre Thiriet	(Spain) TDS Racing	Ret	1	7	Ret	1	38
5	(Austria) Dominik Kraihamer	(Belgium) Boutsen Energy Racing	4	2	10	3	Ret	36
6	(Switzerland) Michel Frey	(Switzerland) Race Performance	6	7	Ret	2	4	35
6	(Switzerland) Ralph Meichtry	(Switzerland) Race Performance	6	7	Ret	2	4	35
7	(United Kingdom) Barry Gates	(United Kingdom) RLR MSport	5	4	Ret	5	5	33
7	(United Kingdom) Rob Garofall	(United Kingdom) RLR MSport	5	4	Ret	5	5	33
8	(Belgium) Nicolas de Crem	(Belgium) Boutsen Energy Racing	4	2	10			25
9	(France) Fabien Rosier	(France) Extrême Limite AM Paris	8	9	8		3	25
10	(Argentina) Luís Pérez Companc	(Argentina) Pecom Racing	2	Ret	4	Ret	Ret	22
10	(Argentina) Matías Russo	(Argentina) Pecom Racing	2	Ret	4	Ret	Ret	22
10	(Germany) Pierre Kaffer	(Argentina) Pecom Racing	2	Ret	4	Ret	Ret	22
11	(France) Gary Chalandon	(United Kingdom) Greaves Motorsport	1	8				20
12	(France) Marc Rostan	(Switzerland) Race Performance		7	Ret	2		19
13	(Norway) Thor-Christian Ebbesvik	(Switzerland) Race Performance / (Belgium) Boutsen Energy Racing	6			3	Ret	18
14	(United Kingdom) Simon Phillips	(United Kingdom) RLR MSport	5	4	Ret			17
15	(United Kingdom) Ben Collins	(United Kingdom) RML	7	DNS	11	4		17
15	(United Kingdom) Mike Newton	(United Kingdom) RML	7	DNS	11	4		17
15	(Brazil) Thomas Erdos	(United Kingdom) RML	7	DNS	11	4		17
16	(United Kingdom) Warren Hughes	(United Kingdom) RLR MSport				5	5	16
17	(Switzerland) Maurice Basso	(France) Extrême Limite AM Paris	8	9	8			14
18	(Portugal) Manuel Mello-Breyner	(France) Extrême Limite AM Paris					3	11
18	(Portugal) Pedro Mello-Breyner	(France) Extrême Limite AM Paris					3	11
19	(Switzerland) Jonathan Hirschi	(Switzerland) Race Performance					4	9
20	(Switzerland) Jean-Marc Luco	(France) Extrême Limite AM Paris	8	9				9

=== FLM Standings ===
Pos	Driver	Team	LEC (France)	SPA (Belgium)	IMO (Italy)	SIL (United Kingdom)	EST (Portugal)	Total
1	(France) Julien Schell	(France) Pegasus Racing	1	1	2	1	1	73
1	(Germany) Mirco Schultis	(France) Pegasus Racing	1	1	2	1	1	73
1	(Germany) Patrick Simon	(France) Pegasus Racing	1	1	2	1	1	73
2	(United Kingdom) John Hartshorne	(United Kingdom) Neil Garner Motorsport	3	3		4	3	45
3	(Germany) Christian Zugel	(United States) Genoa Racing	2	2	4			35
3	(Ecuador) Elton Julian	(United States) Genoa Racing	2	2	4			35
3	(Germany) Jens Petersen	(United States) Genoa Racing	2	2	4			35
4	(United Kingdom) Phil Keen	(United Kingdom) Neil Garner Motorsport	3	3		4		33
4	(United Kingdom) Steve Keating	(United Kingdom) Neil Garner Motorsport	3	3		4		33
5	(France) Nicolas Marroc	(Switzerland) Hope Polevision Racing	Ret	DSQ				30
5	(France) Nicolas Marroc	(Monaco) JMB Racing			1		2	30
6	(United States) Chapman Ducote	(Monaco) JMB Racing			1	3		27
6	(Canada) Kyle Marcelli	(Monaco) JMB Racing			1	3		27
7	(Italy) Luca Moro	(Switzerland) Hope Polevision Racing	Ret	DSQ	3			23
7	(Italy) Luca Moro	(Monaco) JMB Racing				3		23
8	(Thailand) Tor Graves	(Switzerland) Hope Polevision Racing			3			23
8	(Thailand) Tor Graves	(United Kingdom) Neil Garner Motorsport					3	23
9	(France) Jean-Marc Menahem	(Monaco) JMB Racing	4	4				18
10	(Australia) Aldous Mitchell	(United States) Genoa Racing				2		18
10	(Canada) Bassam Kronfli	(United States) Genoa Racing				2		18
10	(South Africa) Jordan Grogor	(United States) Genoa Racing				2		18
11	(Netherlands) Peter Kutemann	(Monaco) JMB Racing					2	13
12	(China) Zhang Shan Qi	(Switzerland) Hope Polevision Racing	Ret	DSQ	3			12
13	(United Kingdom) Alex Kapadia	(United Kingdom) Neil Garner Motorsport					3	12
14	(France) Manuel Rodrigues	(Monaco) JMB Racing	4	4*				9
14	(France) Nicolas Misslin	(Monaco) JMB Racing	4					9
15	(France) Olivier Lombard	(Monaco) JMB Racing		4				9

=== LM GTE Pro Standings ===
Pos	Driver	Team	LEC (France)	SPA (Belgium)	IMO (Italy)	SIL (United Kingdom)	EST (Portugal)	Total
1	(Italy) Giancarlo Fisichella	(Italy) AF Corse	2	(1)	(2)	1	Ret	60
1	(Italy) Gianmaria Bruni	(Italy) AF Corse	2	(1)	(2)	1	Ret	60
2	(United Kingdom) James Walker	(United Kingdom) JMW Motorsport	1	(7)	Ret	(9)	(1)	46
2	(United Kingdom) Rob Bell	(United Kingdom) JMW Motorsport	1	(7)	Ret	(9)	(1)	46
3	(Germany) Marc Lieb	(Germany) Team Felbermayr-Proton	Ret	(8)	(4)	(3)	(2)	44
3	(Austria) Richard Lietz	(Germany) Team Felbermayr-Proton	Ret	(8)	(4)	(3)	(2)	44
4	(Brazil) Jaime Melo	(Italy) AF Corse	4	Ret	(1)	Ret	(4)	37
4	(Finland) Toni Vilander	(Italy) AF Corse	4	Ret	(1)	Ret	(4)	37
5	(Denmark) Allan Simonsen	(Germany) Hankook Team Farnbacher	3	(2)	Ret	(8)	Ret	32
5	(Germany) Dominik Farnbacher	(Germany) Hankook Team Farnbacher	3	(2)	Ret	(8)	Ret	32
6	(France) Patrick Pilet	(France) IMSA Performance Matmut	Ret	Ret	5	(7)	(3)	27
6	(Germany) Wolf Henzler	(France) IMSA Performance Matmut	Ret	Ret	5	(7)	(3)	27
7	(Belgium) Marc Goossens	(Belgium) ProSpeed Competition	Ret	6	(6)	(5)	Ret	25
7	(Germany) Marco Holzer	(Belgium) ProSpeed Competition	Ret	6	(6)	(5)	Ret	25
8	(United Kingdom) Sam Hancock	(United Kingdom) Jota Sport AMR	NC	5	7	11	5	24
8	(United Kingdom) Simon Dolan	(United Kingdom) Jota Sport AMR	NC	5	7	11	5	24
9	(United Kingdom) Chris Buncombe	(United Kingdom) Jota Sport AMR				11		2

=== LM GTE Am Standings ===
Pos	Driver	Team	LEC (France)	SPA (Belgium)	IMO (Italy)	SIL (United Kingdom)	EST (Portugal)	Total
1	(France) Nicolas Armindo	(France) IMSA Performance Matmut	(6)	(1)	1	(1)	(1)	75
1	(France) Raymond Narac	(France) IMSA Performance Matmut	(6)	(1)	1	(1)	(1)	75
2	(Italy) Marco Cioci	(Italy) AF Corse	(2)	(2)	3	(5)	(4)	58
2	(Italy) Piergiuseppe Perazzini	(Italy) AF Corse	(2)	(2)	3	(5)	(4)	58
2	(Belgium) Stéphane Lémeret	(Italy) AF Corse	(2)	(2)	3	(5)	(4)	58
3	(Austria) Horst Felbermayr Jr.	(Germany) Team Felbermayr-Proton	1	(5)	NC	(6)	(3)	44
4	(United Kingdom) Adam Christodoulou	(United Kingdom) CRS Racing	4	Ret	(4)	(9)	2	36
4	(United Kingdom) Phil Quaife	(United Kingdom) CRS Racing	4	Ret	(4)	(9)	2	36
5	(Germany) Christian Ried	(Germany) Team Felbermayr-Proton	1		NC	(6)	(3)	35
6	(Netherlands) Klaas Hummel	(United Kingdom) CRS Racing	4	Ret	4*		2*	9
7	(United States) Bryce Miller	(Germany) Team Felbermayr-Proton		(5)				9
8	(Austria) Horst Felbermayr Sr.	(Germany) Team Felbermayr-Proton	1*					0

== Manufacturers Cups ==
=== LMP1 Standings ===
Pos	Constructor	LEC (France)	SPA (Belgium)	IMO (Italy)	SIL (United Kingdom)	EST (Portugal)	Total
1	Lola-Toyota	25	10	15	9	25	84
2	Pescarolo-Judd	15	7	6	7	15	50
3	Zytek	9	2	0			11
–	Aston Martin	0	0				0

=== LMP2 Standings ===
Pos	Constructor	LEC (France)	SPA (Belgium)	IMO (Italy)	SIL (United Kingdom)	EST (Portugal)	Total
1	ORECA-Nissan	10	28	10	11	15	74
2	Zytek-Nissan	15	5	15	15	14	64
3	HPD	17	12	9	15	7	60
4	ORECA-Judd	7	6	0	13	9	35
5	MG Lola-Judd	8	9		8	8	33
6	Norma-Judd	5	4	5		11	25
7	Lola-Judd	13		9	0	0	22

=== LM GTE Standings ===
Pos	Constructor	LEC (France)	SPA (Belgium)	IMO (Italy)	SIL (United Kingdom)	EST (Portugal)	Total
1	Ferrari	29	30	31	16	29	135
2	Porsche	15	11	18	23	27	94
3	Aston Martin	0	8	3	1	7	19
