= 2011 6 Hours of Imola =

The Track map of Imola Circuit

The 2011 6 Hours of Imola was an auto racing event held at Autodromo Enzo e Dino Ferrari on July 3, 2011. It was the third round of the 2011 Le Mans Series season and the fourth round of the 2011 Intercontinental Le Mans Cup.

== Qualifying ==
=== Qualifying result ===
Pole position winners in each class are marked in bold.

Pos	Class	Team	Driver	Lap Time	Grid
1	**LMP1**	**#7 Peugeot Sport Total**	**Anthony Davidson**	**1:31.736**	**1**
2	LMP1	#1 Audi Sport Team Joest	Marcel Fässler	1:32.354	2
3	LMP1	#8 Peugeot Sport Total	Stéphane Sarrazin	1:32.732	3
4	LMP1	#2 Audi Sport Team Joest	Allan McNish	1:32.974	4
5	LMP1	#15 OAK Racing	Guillaume Moreau	1:34.746	5
6	LMP1	#12 Rebellion Racing	Neel Jani	1:35.047	6
7	LMP1	#13 Rebellion Racing	Andrea Belicchi	1:35.700	7
8	LMP1	#16 Pescarolo Team	Emmanuel Collard	1:35.996	8
9	LMP1	#23 MIK Corse	Máximo Cortés	1:36.084	9
10	**LMP2**	**#46 TDS Racing**	**Mathias Beche**	**1:37.208**	**10**
11	LMP2	#45 Boutsen Energy Racing	Dominik Kraihamer	1:37.476	11
12	LMP2	#42 Strakka Racing	Danny Watts	1:38.118	12
13	LMP2	#26 Signatech Nissan	Soheil Ayari	1:38.351	13
14	LMP2	#41 Greaves Motorsport	Tom Kimber-Smith	1:38.533	14
15	LMP2	#33 Level 5 Motorsports	Christophe Bouchut	1:38.959	15
16	LMP2	#40 Race Performance	Ralph Meichtry	1:38.991	16
17	LMP2	#49 OAK Racing	Alexandre Prémat	1:39.130	17
18	LMP2	#39 Pecom Racing	Pierre Kaffer	1:39.198	18
19	LMP2	#44 Extrême Limite AM Paris	Fabien Rosier	1:39.848	19
20	LMP2	#35 OAK Racing	Andrea Barlesi	1:40.146	20
21	LMP2	#43 RLR msport	Rob Garofall	1:40.543	21
22	LMP2	#36 RML	Thomas Erdos	1:40.642	22
23	**FLM**	**#93 Genoa Racing**	**Elton Julian**	**1:42.574**	**23**
24	FLM	#99 JMB Racing	Nicolas Marroc	1:42.755	24
25	FLM	#95 Pegasus Racing	Patrick Simon	1:43.285	25
26	**GTE-Pro**	**#55 BMW Motorsport**	**Jörg Müller**	**1:44.468**	**26**
27	FLM	#91 Hope Racing	Zhang Shan Qi	1:44.550	27
28	GTE-Pro	#56 BMW Motorsport	Dirk Werner	1:44.683	28
29	GTE-Pro	#71 AF Corse	Jaime Melo	1:44.691	29
30	GTE-Pro	#59 Luxury Racing	Frédéric Makowiecki	1:44.725	30
31	GTE-Pro	#66 JMW Motorsport	Rob Bell	1:44.730	31
32	GTE-Pro	#77 Team Felbermayr-Proton	Richard Lietz	1:44.895	32
33	GTE-Pro	#51 AF Corse	Giancarlo Fisichella	1:45.130	33
34	GTE-Pro	#89 Hankook Team Farnbacher	Dominik Farnbacher	1:45.384	34
35	GTE-Pro	#76 IMSA Performance Matmut	Patrick Pilet	1:45.467	35
36	**GTE-Am**	**#63 Proton Competition**	**Patrick Long**	**1:45.650**	**36**
37	GTE-Pro	#75 Prospeed Competition	Marco Holzer	1:45.767	37
38	GTE-Pro	#58 Luxury Racing	Ralph Firman	1:45.779	38
39	GTE-Pro	#79 Jota	Sam Hancock	1:45.841	39
40	GTE-Am	#61 AF Corse	Marco Cioci	1:45.906	40
41	GTE-Am	#57 Krohn Racing	Michele Rugolo	1:46.219	41
42	GTE-Am	#67 IMSA Performance Matmut	Nicolas Armindo	1:46.283	42
43	GTE-Am	#50 Larbre Compétition	Julien Canal	1:46.614	43
44	GTE-Am	#82 CRS Racing	Adam Christodoulou	1:46.798	44
45	GTE-Am	#62 CRS Racing	Roger Willis	1:48.176	45
46	GTE-Am	#88 Team Felbermayr-Proton	Horst Felbermayr Jr.	1:48.197	46
47	GTE-Pro	#65 Lotus Jetalliance	Jonathan Hirschi	1:49.037	47
48	GTE-Pro	#64 Lotus Jetalliance	Lukas Lichtner-Hoyer	1:50.053	48
49	FLM	#92 Neil Garner Motorsport	No Time		49

== Race result ==
Class winners in bold. Cars failing to complete 70% of winner's distance marked as Not Classified (NC).

Pos	Class	No	Team	Drivers	Chassis	Tire	Laps
Pos	Class	No	Team	Drivers	Engine	Tire	Laps
1	**LMP1**	**7**	**(France) Peugeot Sport Total**	**(France) Sébastien Bourdais (United Kingdom) Anthony Davidson**	**Peugeot 908**	MI	**220**
1	**LMP1**	**7**	**(France) Peugeot Sport Total**	**(France) Sébastien Bourdais (United Kingdom) Anthony Davidson**	**Peugeot HDi 3.7 L Turbo V8 (Diesel)**	MI	**220**
2	LMP1	8	(France) Peugeot Sport Total	(France) Franck Montagny (France) Stéphane Sarrazin	Peugeot 908	MI	220
2	LMP1	8	(France) Peugeot Sport Total	(France) Franck Montagny (France) Stéphane Sarrazin	Peugeot HDi 3.7 L Turbo V8 (Diesel)	MI	220
3	LMP1	1	(Germany) Audi Sport Team Joest	(Germany) Timo Bernhard (Switzerland) Marcel Fässler	Audi R18 TDI	MI	219
3	LMP1	1	(Germany) Audi Sport Team Joest	(Germany) Timo Bernhard (Switzerland) Marcel Fässler	Audi TDI 3.7 L Turbo V6 (Diesel)	MI	219
4	LMP1	2	(Germany) Audi Sport Team Joest	(Denmark) Tom Kristensen (United Kingdom) Allan McNish	Audi R18 TDI	MI	219
4	LMP1	2	(Germany) Audi Sport Team Joest	(Denmark) Tom Kristensen (United Kingdom) Allan McNish	Audi TDI 3.7 L Turbo V6 (Diesel)	MI	219
5	LMP1	13	(Switzerland) Rebellion Racing	(Italy) Andrea Belicchi (France) Jean-Christophe Boullion	Lola B10/60	MI	213
5	LMP1	13	(Switzerland) Rebellion Racing	(Italy) Andrea Belicchi (France) Jean-Christophe Boullion	Toyota RV8KLM 3.4 L Turbo V8	MI	213
6	LMP1	12	(Switzerland) Rebellion Racing	(Switzerland) Neel Jani (France) Nicolas Prost	Lola B10/60	MI	213
6	LMP1	12	(Switzerland) Rebellion Racing	(Switzerland) Neel Jani (France) Nicolas Prost	Toyota RV8KLM 3.4 L V8	MI	213
7	LMP1	16	(France) Pescarolo Team	(France) Emmanuel Collard (France) Christophe Tinseau (France) Julien Jousse	Pescarolo 01 Evo	MI	207
7	LMP1	16	(France) Pescarolo Team	(France) Emmanuel Collard (France) Christophe Tinseau (France) Julien Jousse	Judd GV5 S2 5.0 L V10	MI	207
8	**LMP2**	**41**	**(United Kingdom) Greaves Motorsport**	**(Saudi Arabia) Karim Ojjeh (France) Olivier Lombard (United Kingdom) Tom Kimber-Smith**	**Zytek Z11SN**	D	**205**
8	**LMP2**	**41**	**(United Kingdom) Greaves Motorsport**	**(Saudi Arabia) Karim Ojjeh (France) Olivier Lombard (United Kingdom) Tom Kimber-Smith**	**Nissan VK45DE 4.5 L V8**	D	**205**
9	LMP2	26	(France) Signatech Nissan	(France) Franck Mailleux (Spain) Lucas Ordoñez (France) Soheil Ayari	Oreca 03	MI	203
9	LMP2	26	(France) Signatech Nissan	(France) Franck Mailleux (Spain) Lucas Ordoñez (France) Soheil Ayari	Nissan VK45DE 4.5 L V8	MI	203
10	LMP2	33	(United States) Level 5 Motorsports	(United States) Scott Tucker (France) Christophe Bouchut (Portugal) João Barbosa	Lola B11/40	MI	201
10	LMP2	33	(United States) Level 5 Motorsports	(United States) Scott Tucker (France) Christophe Bouchut (Portugal) João Barbosa	HPD HR28TT 2.8 L Turbo V6	MI	201
11	LMP2	39	(Argentina) Pecom Racing	(Argentina) Luís Pérez Companc (Argentina) Matías Russo (Germany) Pierre Kaffer	Lola B11/40	MI	201
11	LMP2	39	(Argentina) Pecom Racing	(Argentina) Luís Pérez Companc (Argentina) Matías Russo (Germany) Pierre Kaffer	Judd-BMW HK 3.6 L V8	MI	201
12	LMP2	49	(France) OAK Racing	(France) Alexandre Prémat (France) Jacques Nicolet	OAK Pescarolo 01 Evo	D	200
12	LMP2	49	(France) OAK Racing	(France) Alexandre Prémat (France) Jacques Nicolet	Judd-BMW HK 3.6 L V8	D	200
13	**GTE; Pro**	**71**	**(Italy) AF Corse**	**(Brazil) Jaime Melo (Finland) Toni Vilander**	**Ferrari 458 Italia GT2**	MI	**198**
13	**GTE; Pro**	**71**	**(Italy) AF Corse**	**(Brazil) Jaime Melo (Finland) Toni Vilander**	**Ferrari 4.5 L V8**	MI	**198**
14	LMP2	42	(United Kingdom) Strakka Racing	(United Kingdom) Nick Leventis (United Kingdom) Danny Watts (United Kingdom) Jonny Kane	HPD ARX-01d	MI	197
14	LMP2	42	(United Kingdom) Strakka Racing	(United Kingdom) Nick Leventis (United Kingdom) Danny Watts (United Kingdom) Jonny Kane	HPD HR28TT 2.8 L Turbo V6	MI	197
15	GTE; Pro	51	(Italy) AF Corse	(Italy) Giancarlo Fisichella (Italy) Gianmaria Bruni	Ferrari 458 Italia GT2	MI	197
15	GTE; Pro	51	(Italy) AF Corse	(Italy) Giancarlo Fisichella (Italy) Gianmaria Bruni	Ferrari 4.5 L V8	MI	197
16	GTE; Pro	55	(Germany) BMW Motorsport	(Brazil) Augusto Farfus (Germany) Jörg Müller	BMW M3 GT2	D	197
16	GTE; Pro	55	(Germany) BMW Motorsport	(Brazil) Augusto Farfus (Germany) Jörg Müller	BMW 4.0 L V8	D	197
17	GTE; Pro	77	(Germany) Team Felbermayr-Proton	(Germany) Marc Lieb (Austria) Richard Lietz	Porsche 997 GT3-RSR	MI	196
17	GTE; Pro	77	(Germany) Team Felbermayr-Proton	(Germany) Marc Lieb (Austria) Richard Lietz	Porsche 4.0 L Flat-6	MI	196
18	GTE; Pro	76	(France) IMSA Performance Matmut	(France) Patrick Pilet (Germany) Wolf Henzler	Porsche 997 GT3-RSR	MI	196
18	GTE; Pro	76	(France) IMSA Performance Matmut	(France) Patrick Pilet (Germany) Wolf Henzler	Porsche 4.0 L Flat-6	MI	196
19	**FLM**	**99**	**(Monaco) JMB Racing**	**(United States) Chapman Ducote (Canada) Kyle Marcelli (France) Nicolas Marroc**	**Oreca FLM09**	MI	**195**
19	**FLM**	**99**	**(Monaco) JMB Racing**	**(United States) Chapman Ducote (Canada) Kyle Marcelli (France) Nicolas Marroc**	**Chevrolet LS3 6.2 L V8**	MI	**195**
20	FLM	95	(France) Pegasus Racing	(Germany) Mirco Schultis (Germany) Patrick Simon (France) Julien Schell	Oreca FLM09	MI	195
20	FLM	95	(France) Pegasus Racing	(Germany) Mirco Schultis (Germany) Patrick Simon (France) Julien Schell	Chevrolet LS3 6.2 L V8	MI	195
21	LMP2	46	(Spain) TDS Racing	(Switzerland) Mathias Beche (France) Pierre Thiriet (United Kingdom) Jody Firth	Oreca 03	MI	194
21	LMP2	46	(Spain) TDS Racing	(Switzerland) Mathias Beche (France) Pierre Thiriet (United Kingdom) Jody Firth	Nissan VK45DE 4.5 L V8	MI	194
22	**GTE; Am**	**67**	**(France) IMSA Performance Matmut**	**(France) Nicolas Armindo (France) Raymond Narac**	**Porsche 997 GT3-RSR**	MI	**194**
22	**GTE; Am**	**67**	**(France) IMSA Performance Matmut**	**(France) Nicolas Armindo (France) Raymond Narac**	**Porsche 4.0 L Flat-6**	MI	**194**
23	FLM	91	(Switzerland) Hope Racing	(Italy) Luca Moro (China) Zhang Shan Qi (United Kingdom) Tor Graves	Oreca FLM09	MI	194
23	FLM	91	(Switzerland) Hope Racing	(Italy) Luca Moro (China) Zhang Shan Qi (United Kingdom) Tor Graves	Chevrolet LS3 6.2 L V8	MI	194
24	LMP2	44	(France) Extrême Limite AM Paris	(France) Fabien Rosier (Switzerland) Maurice Basso	Norma M200P	D	193
24	LMP2	44	(France) Extrême Limite AM Paris	(France) Fabien Rosier (Switzerland) Maurice Basso	Judd-BMW HK 3.6 L V8	D	193
25	GTE; Am	50	(France) Larbre Compétition	(France) Patrick Bornhauser (France) Julien Canal (Switzerland) Gabriele Gardel	Chevrolet Corvette C6.R	MI	193
25	GTE; Am	50	(France) Larbre Compétition	(France) Patrick Bornhauser (France) Julien Canal (Switzerland) Gabriele Gardel	Chevrolet 5.5 L V8	MI	193
26	FLM	93	(United States) Genoa Racing	(Ecuador) Elton Julian (Germany) Christian Zugel (Germany) Jens Petersen	Oreca FLM09	MI	192
26	FLM	93	(United States) Genoa Racing	(Ecuador) Elton Julian (Germany) Christian Zugel (Germany) Jens Petersen	Chevrolet LS3 6.2 L V8	MI	192
27	GTE; Am	61	(Italy) AF Corse	(Italy) Piergiuseppe Perazzini (Italy) Marco Cioci (Belgium) Stéphane Lémeret	Ferrari F430 GTE	MI	192
27	GTE; Am	61	(Italy) AF Corse	(Italy) Piergiuseppe Perazzini (Italy) Marco Cioci (Belgium) Stéphane Lémeret	Ferrari 4.0 L V8	MI	192
28	GTE; Pro	75	(Belgium) Prospeed Competition	(Belgium) Marc Goossens (Germany) Marco Holzer	Porsche 997 GT3-RSR	MI	191
28	GTE; Pro	75	(Belgium) Prospeed Competition	(Belgium) Marc Goossens (Germany) Marco Holzer	Porsche 4.0 L Flat-6	MI	191
29	LMP2	35	(France) OAK Racing	(Italy) Andrea Barlesi (France) Frédéric da Rocha (France) Patrice Lafargue	OAK Pescarolo 01 Evo	D	191
29	LMP2	35	(France) OAK Racing	(Italy) Andrea Barlesi (France) Frédéric da Rocha (France) Patrice Lafargue	Judd-BMW HK 3.6 V8	D	191
30	GTE; Pro	79	(United Kingdom) Jota	(United Kingdom) Simon Dolan (United Kingdom) Sam Hancock	Aston Martin V8 Vantage GT2	D	191
30	GTE; Pro	79	(United Kingdom) Jota	(United Kingdom) Simon Dolan (United Kingdom) Sam Hancock	Aston Martin 4.5 L V8	D	191
31	LMP2	45	(Belgium) Boutsen Energy Racing	(Austria) Dominik Kraihamer (Belgium) Nicolas de Crem	Oreca 03	D	191
31	LMP2	45	(Belgium) Boutsen Energy Racing	(Austria) Dominik Kraihamer (Belgium) Nicolas de Crem	Nissan VK45DE 4.5 L V8	D	191
32	LMP1	15	(France) OAK Racing	(France) Guillaume Moreau (France) Pierre Ragues	OAK Pescarolo 01 Evo	D	188
32	LMP1	15	(France) OAK Racing	(France) Guillaume Moreau (France) Pierre Ragues	Judd DB 3.4 L V8	D	188
33	GTE; Am	62	(United Kingdom) CRS Racing	(Germany) Pierre Ehret (United Kingdom) Shaun Lynn (New Zealand) Roger Willis	Ferrari F430 GTE	MI	187
33	GTE; Am	62	(United Kingdom) CRS Racing	(Germany) Pierre Ehret (United Kingdom) Shaun Lynn (New Zealand) Roger Willis	Ferrari 4.0 L V8	MI	187
34	LMP2	36	(United Kingdom) RML	(Brazil) Thomas Erdos (United Kingdom) Mike Newton (United Kingdom) Ben Collins	HPD ARX-01d	D	186
34	LMP2	36	(United Kingdom) RML	(Brazil) Thomas Erdos (United Kingdom) Mike Newton (United Kingdom) Ben Collins	HPD HR28TT 2.8 L Turbo V6	D	186
35	GTE; Am	82	(United Kingdom) CRS Racing	(Netherlands) Klaas Hummel (United Kingdom) Adam Christodoulou (United Kingdom) Phil Quaife	Ferrari F430 GTE	MI	185
35	GTE; Am	82	(United Kingdom) CRS Racing	(Netherlands) Klaas Hummel (United Kingdom) Adam Christodoulou (United Kingdom) Phil Quaife	Ferrari 4.0 L V8	MI	185
36	GTE; Pro	56	(Germany) BMW Motorsport	(Germany) Dirk Werner (Portugal) Pedro Lamy	BMW M3 GT2	D	182
36	GTE; Pro	56	(Germany) BMW Motorsport	(Germany) Dirk Werner (Portugal) Pedro Lamy	BMW 4.0 L V8	D	182
37	GTE; Am	57	(United States) Krohn Racing	(Italy) Michele Rugolo (United States) Tracy Krohn (Sweden) Niclas Jönsson	Ferrari F430 GTE	MI	170
37	GTE; Am	57	(United States) Krohn Racing	(Italy) Michele Rugolo (United States) Tracy Krohn (Sweden) Niclas Jönsson	Ferrari 4.0 L V8	MI	170
NC	GTE; Am	88	(Germany) Team Felbermayr-Proton	(Austria) Horst Felbermayr Jr. (Germany) Christian Ried	Porsche 997 GT3-RSR	MI	147
NC	GTE; Am	88	(Germany) Team Felbermayr-Proton	(Austria) Horst Felbermayr Jr. (Germany) Christian Ried	Porsche 4.0 L Flat-6	MI	147
DNF	GTE; Pro	58	(France) Luxury Racing	(France) Anthony Beltoise (France) François Jakubowski (Republic of Ireland) Ralph Firman	Ferrari 458 Italia GT2	MI	189
DNF	GTE; Pro	58	(France) Luxury Racing	(France) Anthony Beltoise (France) François Jakubowski (Republic of Ireland) Ralph Firman	Ferrari 4.5 L V8	MI	189
DNF	LMP1	23	(Italy) MIK Corse	(Spain) Máximo Cortés (Italy) Ferdinando Geri (Italy) Giacomo Piccini	Zytek 09SC	MI	157
DNF	LMP1	23	(Italy) MIK Corse	(Spain) Máximo Cortés (Italy) Ferdinando Geri (Italy) Giacomo Piccini	Zytek ZG348 3.4 L V8 (Hybrid)	MI	157
DNF	GTE; Pro	66	(United Kingdom) JMW Motorsport	(United Kingdom) Rob Bell (United Kingdom) James Walker	Ferrari 458 Italia GT2	D	143
DNF	GTE; Pro	66	(United Kingdom) JMW Motorsport	(United Kingdom) Rob Bell (United Kingdom) James Walker	Ferrari 4.5 L V8	D	143
DNF	LMP2	43	(United Kingdom) RLR msport	(United Kingdom) Barry Gates (United Kingdom) Rob Garofall (United Kingdom) Simon Phillips	MG-Lola EX265	D	140
DNF	LMP2	43	(United Kingdom) RLR msport	(United Kingdom) Barry Gates (United Kingdom) Rob Garofall (United Kingdom) Simon Phillips	Judd-BMW HK 3.6 L V8	D	140
DNF	GTE; Pro	89	(Germany) Hankook Team Farnbacher	(Germany) Dominik Farnbacher (Denmark) Allan Simonsen	Ferrari 458 Italia GT2	HK	101
DNF	GTE; Pro	89	(Germany) Hankook Team Farnbacher	(Germany) Dominik Farnbacher (Denmark) Allan Simonsen	Ferrari 4.5 L V8	HK	101
DNF	LMP2	40	(Switzerland) Race Performance	(Switzerland) Michel Frey (Switzerland) Ralph Meichtry (France) Marc Rostan	Oreca 03	D	69
DNF	LMP2	40	(Switzerland) Race Performance	(Switzerland) Michel Frey (Switzerland) Ralph Meichtry (France) Marc Rostan	Judd-BMW HK 3.6 L V8	D	69
DNF	GTE; Pro	64	(Austria) Lotus Jetalliance	(Austria) Lukas Lichtner-Hoyer (United Kingdom) Martin Rich (Netherlands) Oskar Slingerland	Lotus Evora GTE	MI	26
DNF	GTE; Pro	64	(Austria) Lotus Jetalliance	(Austria) Lukas Lichtner-Hoyer (United Kingdom) Martin Rich (Netherlands) Oskar Slingerland	Toyota (Cosworth) 4.0 L V6	MI	26
DNF	GTE; Pro	65	(Austria) Lotus Jetalliance	(Switzerland) Jonathan Hirschi (United Kingdom) James Rossiter (United Kingdom) Johnny Mowlem	Lotus Evora GTE	MI	8
DNF	GTE; Pro	65	(Austria) Lotus Jetalliance	(Switzerland) Jonathan Hirschi (United Kingdom) James Rossiter (United Kingdom) Johnny Mowlem	Toyota (Cosworth) 4.0 V8	MI	8
DNF	GTE; Pro	59	(France) Luxury Racing	(Monaco) Stéphane Ortelli (France) Frédéric Makowiecki	Ferrari 458 Italia GT2	MI	1
DNF	GTE; Pro	59	(France) Luxury Racing	(Monaco) Stéphane Ortelli (France) Frédéric Makowiecki	Ferrari 4.5 L V8	MI	1
DSQ*	GTE; Am	63	(Germany) Proton Competition	(United States) Patrick Long (Italy) Gianluca Roda	Porsche 997 GT3-RSR	MI	194
DSQ*	GTE; Am	63	(Germany) Proton Competition	(United States) Patrick Long (Italy) Gianluca Roda	Porsche 4.0 L Flat-6	MI	194

- Patrick Long stayed behind the wheel 15 minutes longer than the time limit and the #63 was subsequently disqualified.

Le Mans Series
Previous race: 1000 km of Spa	2011 season	Next race: 6 Hours of Silverstone
