= 2011 6 Hours of Estoril =

Layout of the Autódromo do Estoril

The 2011 6 Hours of Estoril (6 Horas do Estoril) was the final round of the 2011 Le Mans Series season. It took place at the Autódromo do Estoril on September 25, 2011.

== Qualifying ==
=== Qualifying result ===
Pole position winners in each class are marked in bold.

Pos	Class	Team	Driver	Lap Time	Grid
1	**LMP1**	**No.12 Rebellion Racing**	**Neel Jani**	**1:30.118**	**1**
2	LMP1	No.16 Pescarolo Team	Julien Jousse	1:30.317	2
3	LMP1	No.13 Rebellion Racing	Jean-Christophe Boullion	1:30.592	3
4	**LMP2**	**No.41 Greaves Motorsport**	**Tom Kimber-Smith**	**1:31.800**	**4**
5	LMP2	No.42 Strakka Racing	Danny Watts	1:32.072	5
6	LMP2	No.46 TDS Racing	Mathias Beche	1:32.347	6
7	LMP2	No.45 Boutsen Energy Racing	Thor-Christian Ebbesvik	1:32.695	7
8	LMP2	No.40 Race Performance	Jonathan Hirschi	1:33.286	8
9	LMP2	No.39 Pecom Racing	Pierre Kaffer	1:33.525	9
10	LMP2	No.43 RLR msport	Warren Hughes	1:34.066	10
11	LMP2	No.44 Extrême Limite AM Paris	Fabien Rosier	1:34.168	11
12	**FLM**	**No.92 Neil Garner Motorsport**	**Alex Kapadia**	**1:36.044**	**12**
13	FLM	No.99 JMB Racing	Nicolas Marroc	1:36.480	13
14	FLM	No.95 Pegasus Racing	Patrick Simon	1:37.474	14
15	**GTE-Pro**	**No.66 JMW Motorsport**	**Rob Bell**	**1:39.176**	**15**
16	GTE-Pro	No.51 AF Corse	Gianmaria Bruni	1:39.233	16
17	GTE-Pro	No.77 Team Felbermayr-Proton	Richard Lietz	1:39.374	17
18	GTE-Pro	No.75 Prospeed Competition	Marco Holzer	1:39.526	18
19	GTE-Pro	No.89 Hankook Team Farnbacher	Dominik Farnbacher	1:39.749	19
20	GTE-Pro	No.76 IMSA Performance Matmut	Patrick Pilet	1:39.964	20
21	**GTE-Am**	**No.67 IMSA Performance Matmut**	**Nicolas Armindo**	**1:40.014**	**21**
22	GTE-Pro	No.71 AF Corse	Jaime Melo	1:40.390	22
23	GTE-Pro	No.79 Jota	Sam Hancock	1:40.417	23
24	GTE-Am	No.61 AF Corse	Marco Cioci	1:40.588	24
25	GTE-Pro	No.90 JMB Racing	Soheil Ayari	1:40.746	25
26	GTE-Am	No.82 CRS Racing	Phil Quaife	1:40.777	26
27	GTE-Am	No.88 Team Felbermayr-Proton	Christian Ried	1:42.107	27

=== Race result ===
Class winners in bold. Cars failing to complete 70% of winner's distance marked as Not Classified (NC).

Pos	Class	No	Team	Drivers	Chassis	Tyre	Laps
Pos	Class	No	Team	Drivers	Engine	Tyre	Laps
1	**LMP1**	**16**	**(France) Pescarolo Team**	**(France) Emmanuel Collard (France) Julien Jousse**	**Pescarolo 01 Evo**	MI	**225**
1	**LMP1**	**16**	**(France) Pescarolo Team**	**(France) Emmanuel Collard (France) Julien Jousse**	**Judd GV5 S2 5.0 L V10**	MI	**225**
2	LMP1	13	(Switzerland) Rebellion Racing	(France) Jean-Christophe Boullion (Italy) Andrea Belicchi	Lola B10/60	MI	224
2	LMP1	13	(Switzerland) Rebellion Racing	(France) Jean-Christophe Boullion (Italy) Andrea Belicchi	Toyota RV8KLM 3.4 L V8	MI	224
3	**LMP2**	**46**	**(Spain) TDS Racing**	**(Switzerland) Mathias Beche (France) Pierre Thiriet (United Kingdom) Jody Firth**	**Oreca 03**	MI	**219**
3	**LMP2**	**46**	**(Spain) TDS Racing**	**(Switzerland) Mathias Beche (France) Pierre Thiriet (United Kingdom) Jody Firth**	**Nissan VK45DE 4.5 L V8**	MI	**219**
4	LMP2	41	(United Kingdom) Greaves Motorsport	(France) Olivier Lombard (Saudi Arabia) Karim Ojjeh (United Kingdom) Tom Kimber-Smith	Zytek Z11SN	D	217
4	LMP2	41	(United Kingdom) Greaves Motorsport	(France) Olivier Lombard (Saudi Arabia) Karim Ojjeh (United Kingdom) Tom Kimber-Smith	Nissan VK45DE 4.5 L V8	D	217
5	LMP2	44	(France) Extrême Limite AM Paris	(France) Fabien Rosier (Portugal) Manuel Mello-Breyner (Portugal) Pedro Mello-Breyner	Norma M200P	D	210
5	LMP2	44	(France) Extrême Limite AM Paris	(France) Fabien Rosier (Portugal) Manuel Mello-Breyner (Portugal) Pedro Mello-Breyner	Judd-BMW HK 3.6 L V8	D	210
6	**GTE; Pro**	**66**	**(United Kingdom) JMW Motorsport**	**(United Kingdom) Rob Bell (United Kingdom) James Walker**	**Ferrari 458 Italia GT2**	D	**209**
6	**GTE; Pro**	**66**	**(United Kingdom) JMW Motorsport**	**(United Kingdom) Rob Bell (United Kingdom) James Walker**	**Ferrari 4.5 L V8**	D	**209**
7	GTE; Pro	77	(Germany) Team Felbermayr-Proton	(Germany) Marc Lieb (Austria) Richard Lietz	Porsche 997 GT3-RSR	MI	209
7	GTE; Pro	77	(Germany) Team Felbermayr-Proton	(Germany) Marc Lieb (Austria) Richard Lietz	Porsche 4.0 L Flat-6	MI	209
8	LMP2	40	(Switzerland) Race Performance	(Switzerland) Michel Frey (Switzerland) Ralph Meichtry (Switzerland) Jonathan Hirschi	Oreca 03	D	208
8	LMP2	40	(Switzerland) Race Performance	(Switzerland) Michel Frey (Switzerland) Ralph Meichtry (Switzerland) Jonathan Hirschi	Judd-BMW HK 3.6 L V8	D	208
9	GTE; Pro	76	(France) IMSA Performance Matmut	(France) Patrick Pilet (Germany) Wolf Henzler	Porsche 997 GT3-RSR	MI	207
9	GTE; Pro	76	(France) IMSA Performance Matmut	(France) Patrick Pilet (Germany) Wolf Henzler	Porsche 4.0 L Flat-6	MI	207
10	GTE; Pro	71	(Italy) AF Corse	(Brazil) Jaime Melo (Finland) Toni Vilander	Ferrari 458 Italia GT2	MI	206
10	GTE; Pro	71	(Italy) AF Corse	(Brazil) Jaime Melo (Finland) Toni Vilander	Ferrari 4.5 L V8	MI	206
11	**GTE; Am**	**67**	**(France) IMSA Performance Matmut**	**(France) Raymond Narac (France) Nicolas Armindo**	**Porsche 997 GT3-RSR**	MI	**205**
11	**GTE; Am**	**67**	**(France) IMSA Performance Matmut**	**(France) Raymond Narac (France) Nicolas Armindo**	**Porsche 4.0 L Flat-6**	MI	**205**
12	**FLM**	**95**	**(France) Pegasus Racing**	**(Germany) Mirco Schultis (Germany) Patrick Simon (France) Julien Schell**	**Oreca FLM09**	MI	**204**
12	**FLM**	**95**	**(France) Pegasus Racing**	**(Germany) Mirco Schultis (Germany) Patrick Simon (France) Julien Schell**	**Chevrolet LS3 6.2 L V8**	MI	**204**
13	GTE; Pro	79	(United Kingdom) JOTA	(United Kingdom) Simon Dolan (United Kingdom) Sam Hancock	Aston Martin V8 Vantage GT2	D	204
13	GTE; Pro	79	(United Kingdom) JOTA	(United Kingdom) Simon Dolan (United Kingdom) Sam Hancock	Aston Martin 4.5 L V8	D	204
14	FLM	99	(Monaco) JMB Racing	(Netherlands) Peter Kutemann (France) Nicolas Marroc	Oreca FLM09	MI	203
14	FLM	99	(Monaco) JMB Racing	(Netherlands) Peter Kutemann (France) Nicolas Marroc	Chevrolet LS3 6.2 L V8	MI	203
15	GTE; Am	82	(United Kingdom) CRS Racing	(United Kingdom) Phil Quaife (United Kingdom) Adam Christodoulou (Netherlands) Klaas Hummel	Ferrari F430 GTE	MI	203
15	GTE; Am	82	(United Kingdom) CRS Racing	(United Kingdom) Phil Quaife (United Kingdom) Adam Christodoulou (Netherlands) Klaas Hummel	Ferrari 4.0 L V8	MI	203
16	GTE; Am	88	(Germany) Team Felbermayr-Proton	(Austria) Horst Felbermayr, Jr. (Germany) Christian Ried	Porsche 997 GT3-RSR	MI	202
16	GTE; Am	88	(Germany) Team Felbermayr-Proton	(Austria) Horst Felbermayr, Jr. (Germany) Christian Ried	Porsche 4.0 L Flat-6	MI	202
17	LMP2	43	(United Kingdom) RLR msport	(United Kingdom) Barry Gates (United Kingdom) Rob Garofall (United Kingdom) Warren Hughes	MG-Lola EX265	D	201
17	LMP2	43	(United Kingdom) RLR msport	(United Kingdom) Barry Gates (United Kingdom) Rob Garofall (United Kingdom) Warren Hughes	Judd-BMW HK 3.6 L V8	D	201
18	LMP2	42	(United Kingdom) Strakka Racing	(United Kingdom) Danny Watts (United Kingdom) Jonny Kane (United Kingdom) Nick Leventis	HPD ARX-01d	MI	201
18	LMP2	42	(United Kingdom) Strakka Racing	(United Kingdom) Danny Watts (United Kingdom) Jonny Kane (United Kingdom) Nick Leventis	HPD HR28TT 2.8 L Turbo V6	MI	201
19	GTE; Pro	90	(France) JMB Racing	(France) Soheil Ayari (France) Pascal Ballay (Portugal) Manuel Rodrigues	Ferrari 458 Italia GT2	MI	197
19	GTE; Pro	90	(France) JMB Racing	(France) Soheil Ayari (France) Pascal Ballay (Portugal) Manuel Rodrigues	Ferrari 4.5 L V8	MI	197
20	LMP1	12	(Switzerland) Rebellion Racing	(Switzerland) Neel Jani (France) Nicolas Prost	Lola B10/60	MI	187
20	LMP1	12	(Switzerland) Rebellion Racing	(Switzerland) Neel Jani (France) Nicolas Prost	Toyota RV8KLM 3.4 L V8	MI	187
21	FLM	92	(United Kingdom) Neil Garner Motorsport	(United Kingdom) John Hartshorne (United Kingdom) Alex Kapadia (United Kingdom) Tor Graves	Oreca FLM09	MI	173
21	FLM	92	(United Kingdom) Neil Garner Motorsport	(United Kingdom) John Hartshorne (United Kingdom) Alex Kapadia (United Kingdom) Tor Graves	Chevrolet LS3 6.2 L V8	MI	173
22	GTE; Am	61	(Italy) AF Corse	(Italy) Piergiuseppe Perazzini (Italy) Marco Cioci (Belgium) Stéphane Lémeret	Ferrari F430 GTE	MI	164
22	GTE; Am	61	(Italy) AF Corse	(Italy) Piergiuseppe Perazzini (Italy) Marco Cioci (Belgium) Stéphane Lémeret	Ferrari 4.0 V8	MI	164
23 DNF	LMP2	45	(Belgium) Boutsen Energy Racing	(Austria) Dominik Kraihamer (Norway) Thor-Christian Ebbesvik	Oreca 03	D	218
23 DNF	LMP2	45	(Belgium) Boutsen Energy Racing	(Austria) Dominik Kraihamer (Norway) Thor-Christian Ebbesvik	Nissan VK45DE 4.5 L V8	D	218
24 DNF	GTE; Pro	89	(Germany) Hankook Team Farnbacher	(Germany) Dominik Farnbacher (Denmark) Allan Simonsen	Ferrari 458 Italia GT2	HK	99
24 DNF	GTE; Pro	89	(Germany) Hankook Team Farnbacher	(Germany) Dominik Farnbacher (Denmark) Allan Simonsen	Ferrari 4.5 L V8	HK	99
25 DNF	LMP2	39	(Argentina) Pecom Racing	(Argentina) Matías Russo (Argentina) Luís Pérez Companc (Germany) Pierre Kaffer	Lola B11/40	MI	97
25 DNF	LMP2	39	(Argentina) Pecom Racing	(Argentina) Matías Russo (Argentina) Luís Pérez Companc (Germany) Pierre Kaffer	Judd-BMW HK 3.6 L V8	MI	97
26 DNF	GTE; Pro	51	(Italy) AF Corse	(Italy) Giancarlo Fisichella (Italy) Gianmaria Bruni	Ferrari 458 Italia GT2	MI	11
26 DNF	GTE; Pro	51	(Italy) AF Corse	(Italy) Giancarlo Fisichella (Italy) Gianmaria Bruni	Ferrari 4.5 L V8	MI	11
27 DNF	GTE; Pro	75	(Belgium) Prospeed Competition	(Germany) Marco Holzer (Belgium) Marc Goossens	Porsche 997 GT3-RSR	MI	2
27 DNF	GTE; Pro	75	(Belgium) Prospeed Competition	(Germany) Marco Holzer (Belgium) Marc Goossens	Porsche 4.0 L Flat-6	MI	2

Le Mans Series
Previous race: 6 Hours of Silverstone	2011 season	Next race: none
