= 908 (disambiguation) =

908 may refer to:

- Area code 908
- 908 AD
- 908 BC
- 908 (number)
- Porsche 908, a racing car
- Peugeot 908, a Le Mans Prototype racing car
  - Peugeot 908 HDi FAP, a sports prototype racing car
- 908 Taiwan Republic Campaign, an umbrella organisation of activist groups for the goal of Taiwanese independence

== See also ==
- List of highways numbered 908
