= Aston Martin AMR-One =

Le Mans Prototype car

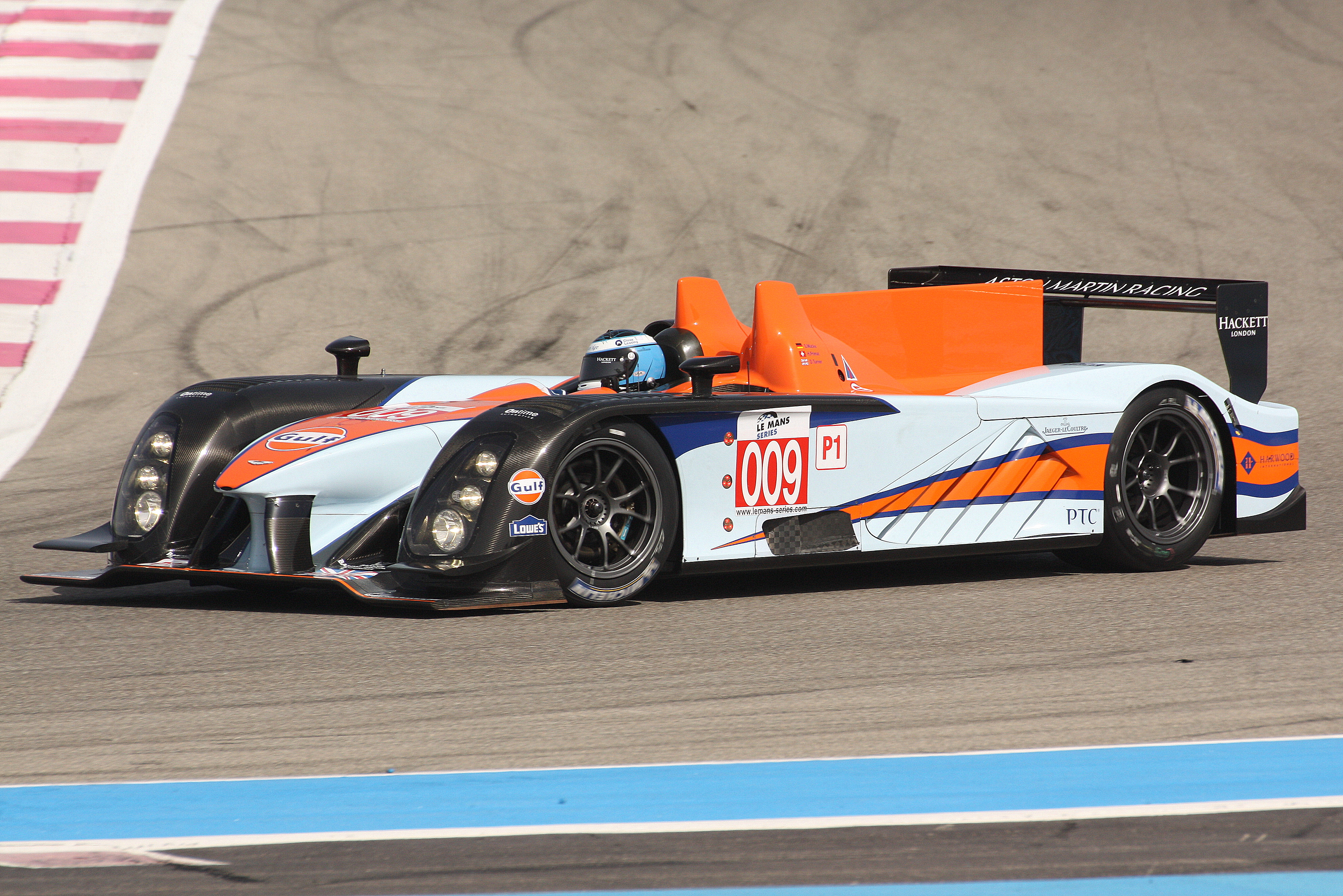
- Darren Turner driving the No. 009 AMR-One at the 2011 6 Hours of Castellet
- Category: Le Mans Prototype LMP1
- Constructor: Aston Martin Racing (Prodrive)
- Designer: George Howard-Chappell
- Predecessor: Aston Martin DBR1-2
- Successor: Aston Martin Valkyrie AMR-LMH

Technical specifications
- Chassis: Carbon fibre monocoque
- Suspension (front): Double wishbone with push rod Koni dampers, 3rd spring/damper, front ARB
- Suspension (rear): Double wishbone with adjustable Koni dampers and 3rd spring/damper
- Length: 4,640 mm (182.7 in)
- Width: 1,990 mm (78.3 in)
- Wheelbase: 2,930 mm (115.4 in)
- Engine: Aston Martin 2,000 cc (120 cu in) straight six, turbocharged, mid-engined, longitudinally mounted, approx. 540 hp (400 kW)
- Transmission: Xtrac 6-speed sequential manual
- Weight: Appr. 900 kg (2,000 lb)
- Tyres: Michelin

Competition history
- Notable entrants: (United Kingdom) Aston Martin Racing
- Notable drivers: (Germany) Stefan Mücke; (United Kingdom) Darren Turner; (Switzerland) Christian Klien; (Mexico) Adrián Fernández; (Switzerland) Harold Primat; (United Kingdom) Andy Meyrick
- Debut: 2011 6 Hours of Castellet
- Last event: 2011 24 Hours of Le Mans
Races	Wins	Poles	F/Laps
2	0	0	0

The Aston Martin AMR-One was a Le Mans Prototype sports car built by Prodrive's Aston Martin Racing arm. The car was a successor to the Aston Martin DBR1-2.

== Development ==
To meet the new regulations brought in by the ACO for endurance racing, the AMR-One is powered by a downsized, 2.0-litre turbocharged straight six petrol engine and features a blade-fin behind the cockpit. The AMR-One is built around a light carbon fibre monocoque chassis with open top bodywork, in contrast to the closed cockpits of the contemporary Peugeot 908 and Audi R18.

The car has a very high belt-line, broad shapes and few surface breaks. The front of the car is designed to develop minimal downforce and to force as much air into the ducts. The air then moves through the car instead of over the top. There are numerous ducts inside the high bodywork, one for brake cooling, two through the side vents and one for rear gearbox cooling. One air scoop is in place to feed the turbocharger. Two side ducts on the rear of the car are for rear-brake cooling. The exhaust exits at the bottom of the vertical fin.

== Racing history ==
=== 2011 ===
Six cars were expected to be built, with Aston Martin Racing participating in several international endurance events in 2011, including the 24 Hours of Le Mans. At the 6 Hours of Castellet, the new AMR-One qualified 5 seconds behind the Pescarolo. In the race things took a downturn and the AMR-One finished way down the order. Further problems continued as they only completed a handful of laps at the Le Mans Test Day and were far slower than the top running LMP1 cars. The poor testing was followed by their withdrawal from the 1000 km Spa in order to continue private testing for Le Mans. At the 24 Hours of Le Mans, the #009 car retired after only two laps, whilst the #007 car spent four hours in the pit before officially retiring, having driven only four laps. Aston Martin decided to skip the Imola round in favour of developing the car, earning them 3 DNS in 4 races and no points. At the 1,000 km of Silverstone, Aston Martin dropped the AMR-One and replaced them with their older but much faster Lola-Aston Martin B09/60.

Jota Sport had placed an order for 2 chassis, to be delivered during 2011. This didn't happen as the project was cancelled.

Two of the AMR-One chassis were later sold to other programs. The DeltaWing project utilized an AMR-One chassis for the base of its radical design due to the team not needing to rehomologate a chassis which had already passed safety tests. A second AMR-One chassis was sold to Pescarolo Team for their use in developing the Pescarolo 03 LMP1 chassis.

== Discontinuation ==
In January 2012, Aston Martin Racing announced they were ceasing development of the AMR-One and instead focusing once again on their GT program. Racing driver Darren Turner blamed the public development of the AMR-One and its rushed entry as its undoing citing that most teams develop their new cars completely behind closed doors for at least a year before attempting to race with them.

== Competition history ==
=== Complete Le Mans Series results ===
(key) Races in bold indicates pole position. Races in italics indicates fastest lap.

Complete Le Mans Series results
Year	Entrant	Class	Drivers	No.	Rds.	Rounds					Pts.	Pos.
Year	Entrant	Class	Drivers	No.	Rds.	1	2	3	4	5	Pts.	Pos.
2011	(United Kingdom) Aston Martin Racing	LMP1	(Germany) Stefan Mücke (United Kingdom) Darren Turner (Switzerland) Harold Primat	009	1; 1; 1	LEC; Ret	SPA	IMO	SIL	EST	0	NC

=== Complete Intercontinental Le Mans Cup Results ===
(key) Races in bold indicates pole position. Races in italics indicates fastest lap.

Complete Intercontinental Le Mans Cup Results
Year	Entrant	Class	Drivers	No.	Rds.	Rounds							Pts.	Pos.
Year	Entrant	Class	Drivers	No.	Rds.	1	2	3	4	5	6	7	Pts.	Pos.
2011	(United Kingdom) Aston Martin Racing	LMP1	(Germany) Stefan Mücke (United Kingdom) Darren Turner (Austria) Christian Klien	007	3; 3; 3	SEB	SPA	LMS; Ret	IMO	SIL	ATL	ZHU	22*	6th*
2011	(United Kingdom) Aston Martin Racing	LMP1	(Switzerland) Harold Primat (Mexico) Adrián Fernández (United Kingdom) Andy Meyrick	009	3; 3; 3	SEB	SPA	LMS; Ret	IMO	SIL	ATL	ZHU	22*	6th*

* Points were scored with the B09/60

== Gallery ==
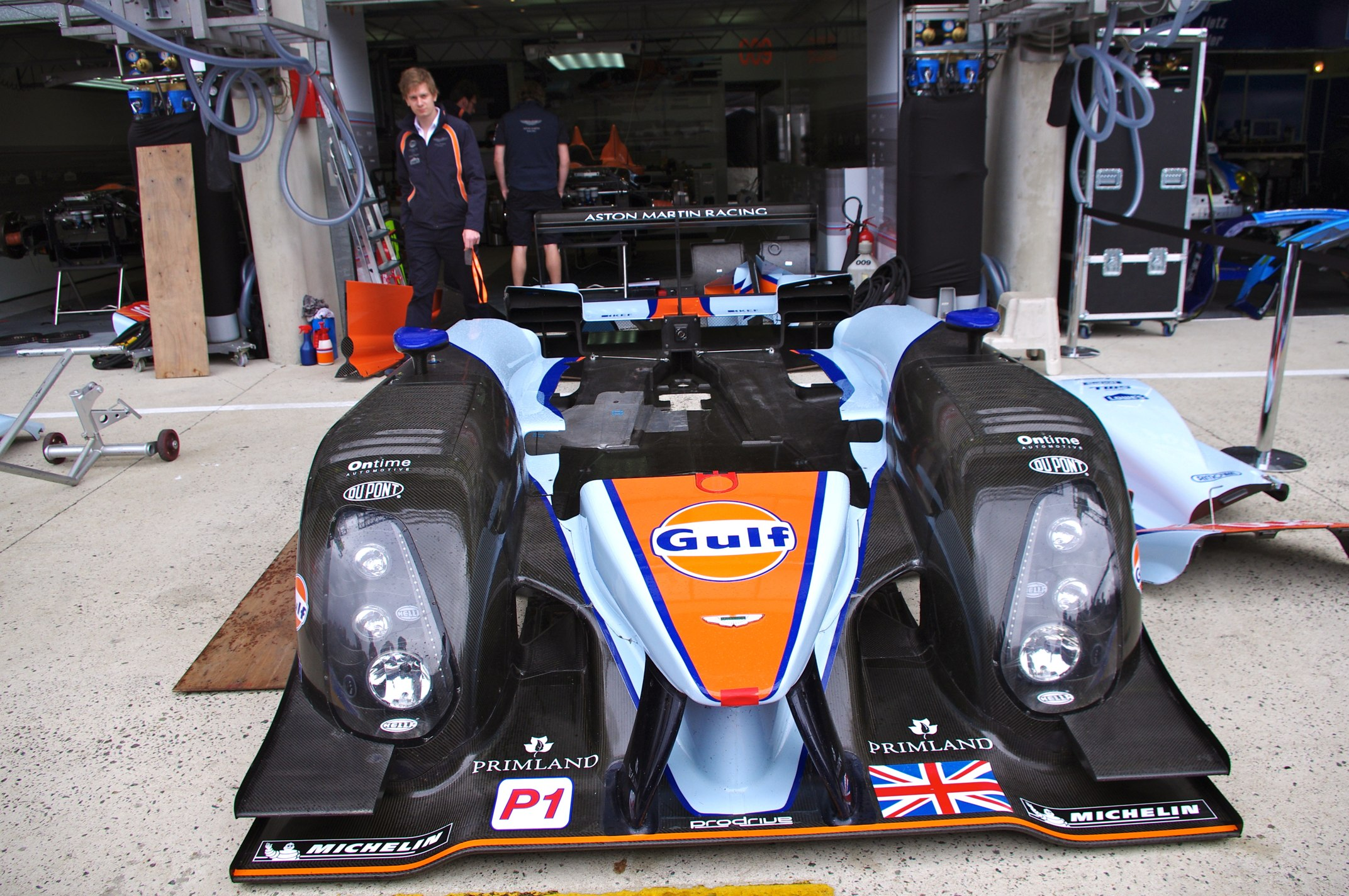
Front view

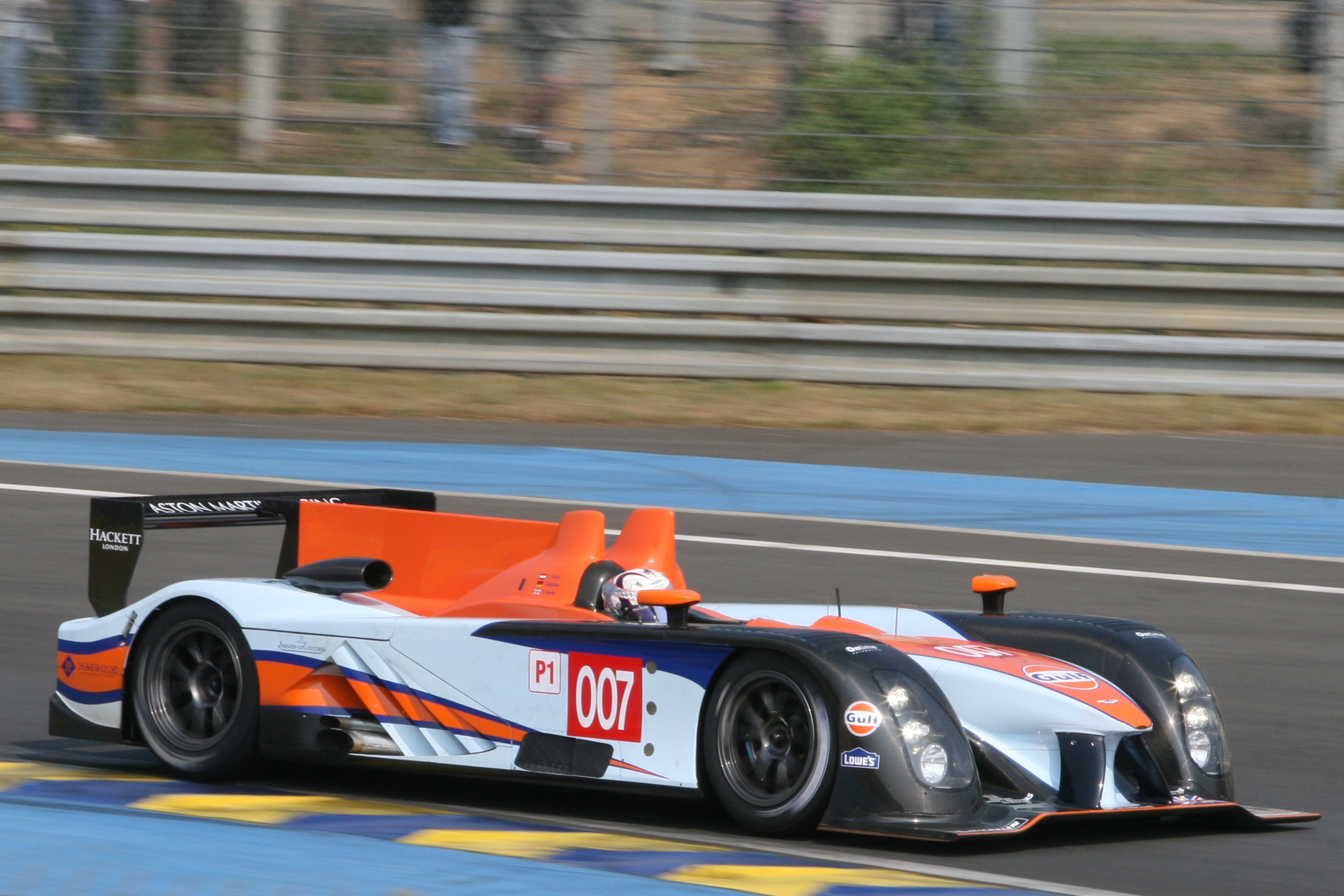
Right view

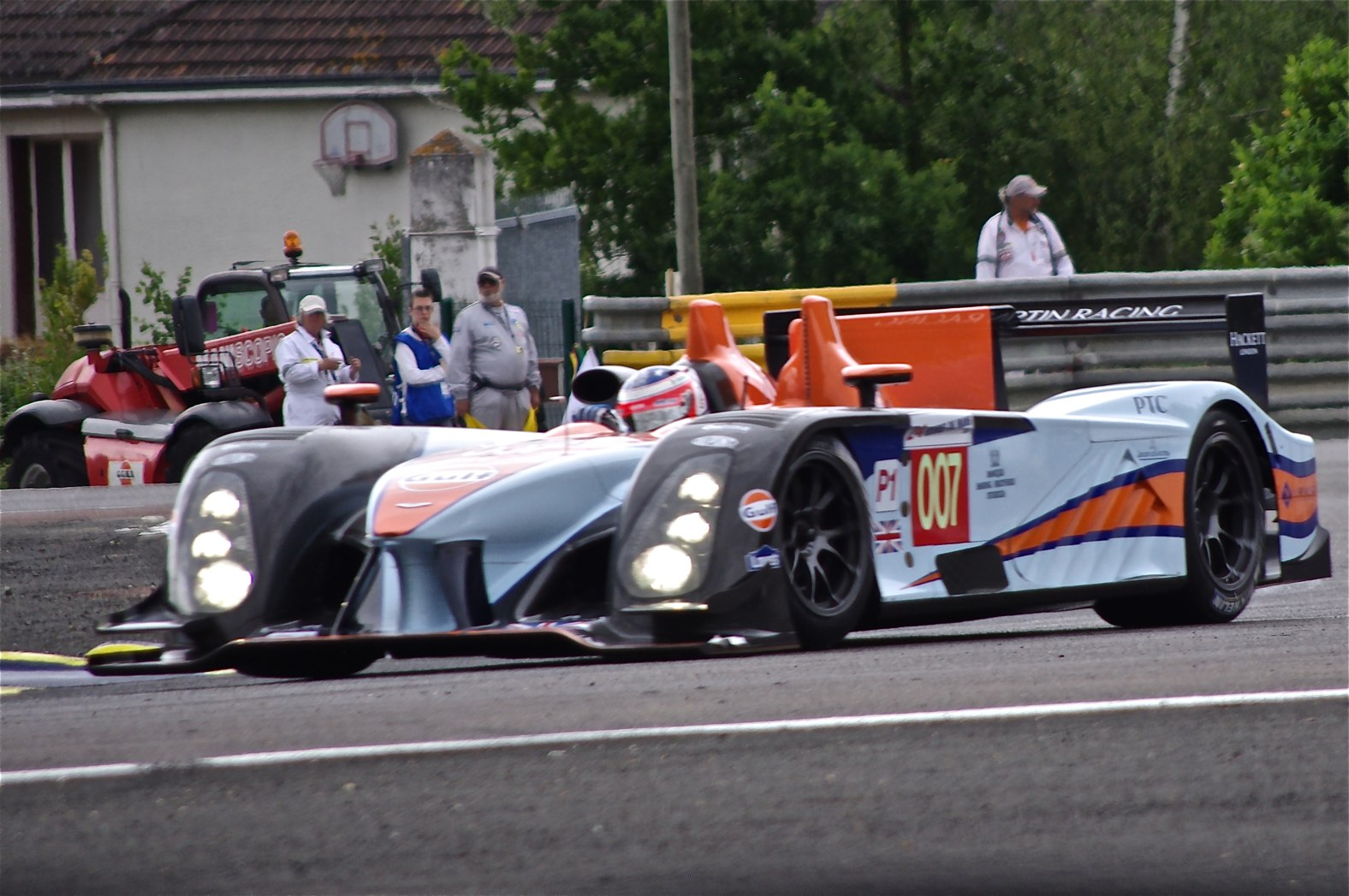
Front left view
