= 905 (disambiguation) =

905 may refer to:

- 905, the year
- Area codes 905, 289, 365, and 742, a telephone dialing area in southern Ontario, Canada
- The 905, a nickname for the region served by the above area codes
- "905" (song), a song by The Who, written by John Entwistle, from the 1978 album Who Are You
- Peugeot 905, a sports-prototype racing car
- California State Route 905, a highway in San Diego, California, United States
- Raptors 905, NBA G League team based in Mississauga, Ontario, Canada

== See also ==
- List of highways numbered 905
