= List of highways numbered 904 =

The following highways are numbered 904:

== Costa Rica ==
- National Route 904

== United States ==
- LA 904 (former)
- MD 904
- PR-904
- SC 904
- FM 904
- SR 904

Preceded by 903	Lists of highways 904	Succeeded by 905
