= List of highways numbered 903 =

Route 903, or Highway 903, may refer to:

== Canada ==
- Saskatchewan Highway 903

== Costa Rica ==
- National Route 903

== United Kingdom ==
- A903 road

== United States ==
- KY 903
- MD 903
- NC 903
- PA 903
- SR 903

Preceded by 902	Lists of highways 903	Succeeded by 904
