= Aston Martin 2.0 straight-six racing engine =

Aston Martin AMR-One engine

Overview
- Manufacturer: (United Kingdom) Aston Martin
- Production: 2011

Layout
- Configuration: 95° I-6
- Displacement: 2.0 L (122 cu in)
- Cylinder block material: Aluminum
- Cylinder head material: Aluminum
- Valvetrain: 24-valve, DOHC, four-valves per cylinder

Combustion
- Fuel system: Directi injection
- Oil system: Dry sump

Output
- Power output: 540 hp (403 kW)

Aston Martin designed, developed, and produced a custom-made and purpose-built 2.0 L (120 cu in) DOHC turbocharged straight-six engine, with their AMR-One LMP1 prototype race car, in 2011.

== Applications ==
- Aston Martin AMR-One
