= List of highways numbered 907 =

The following highways are numbered 907:

== Costa Rica ==
- National Route 907

== India ==
- National Highway 907 (India)

== United States ==
- SR 907
- KY 907
- LA 907
- PR-907
- FM 907

| Preceded by 906 | Lists of highways 907 | Succeeded by 908 |
