= List of highways numbered 906 =

The following highways are numbered 906:

== Costa Rica ==
- National Route 906

== United States ==
- SR 906 (former)
- LA 906
- PA 906
- PR-906
- FM 906
- SR 906

Preceded by 905	Lists of highways 906	Succeeded by 907
