= 2011 24 Hours of Le Mans =

79th 24 Hours of Le Mans endurance race

Previous: 2010	Next: 2012
Index: Races | Winners

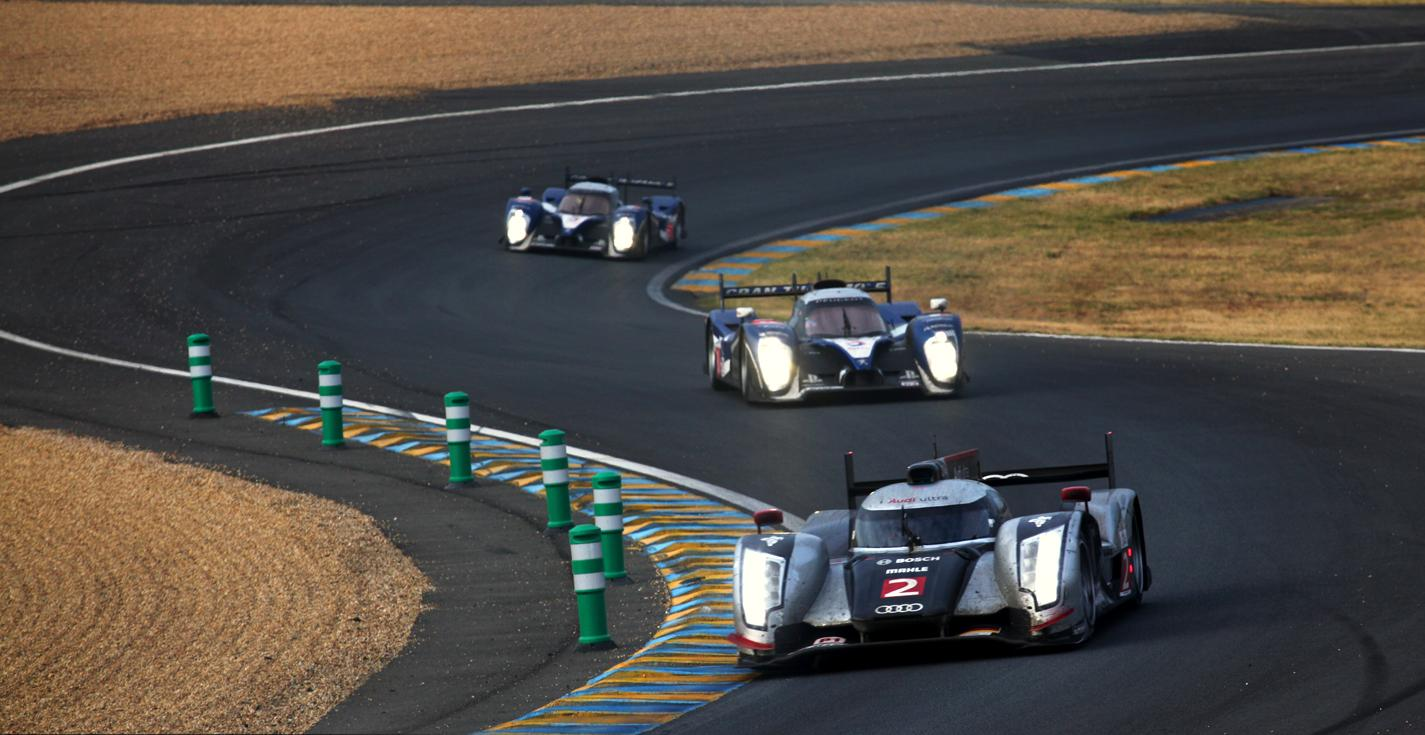
The No. 2 Audi R18 TDI leading a duo of Peugeot 908s

The 79th 24 Hours of Le Mans (French: 79^{e} 24 Heures du Mans) was a 24-hour automobile endurance race for 56 teams of three drivers in Le Mans Prototype (LMP) and Le Mans Grand Touring Endurance (LMGTE) cars, held before 249,500 spectators on 11 and 12 June 2011 at the Circuit de la Sarthe, near Le Mans, France. It was the third round of the 2011 Intercontinental Le Mans Cup and the race's 79th edition as organised by the automotive group the Automobile Club de l'Ouest (ACO) since 1923. This was the first time the race had been part of a championship or series since 1992. On 24 April, six weeks prior, a test day was held.

An Audi R18 TDI—driven by Marcel Fässler, André Lotterer, and Benoît Tréluyer—started from the pole position after Tréluyer set the fastest lap in the third qualifying session. The car battled a trio of Peugeot 908s and secured the first Le Mans victory for the drivers, and Audi's tenth Le Mans victory. The Peugeot 908 driven by Sébastien Bourdais, Pedro Lamy, and Simon Pagenaud finished second, 13.854 seconds behind, in the race's fourth-closest result; and their teammates Nicolas Minassian, Franck Montagny, and Stéphane Sarrazin completed the podium in third, two laps behind the race-winning Audi.

The Greaves Motorsport team of Tom Kimber-Smith, Olivier Lombard, and Karim Ojjeh won the Le Mans Prototype 2 (LMP2) category after leading for the race's final 137 laps in a Zytek Z11SN-Nissan car. The trio finished six laps ahead of Signatech Nissan's Oreca 03 vehicle driven by Soheil Ayari, Franck Mailleux, and Lucas Ordóñez, and seven laps in front of Level 5 Motorsports' Lola B08/80 car driven by João Barbosa, Christophe Bouchut, and Scott Tucker. Corvette Racing took their seventh class win—courtesy of drivers Olivier Beretta, Antonio García, and Tommy Milner—finishing first in a Chevrolet Corvette C6.R in the new Le Mans Grand Touring Professional (LMGTE Pro) category. An AF Corse-fielded Ferrari 458 Italia GT2—driven by Gianmaria Bruni, Giancarlo Fisichella, and Toni Vilander—and BMW Motorsport's BMW M3 GT2—driven by Joey Hand, Dirk Müller, and Andy Priaulx—in second and third, respectively, completed the class podium. Larbre Compétition took the first two positions in the new Le Mans Grand Touring Endurance Amateur (LMGTE Am) class with their Chevrolet Corvette C6.R—driven by Patrick Bornhauser, Julien Canal, and Gabriele Gardel—ahead of the sister Porsche 997 GT3-RSR—driven by Jean-Philippe Belloc, Christophe Bourret, and Pascal Gibon.

Audi's victory moved them closer to Peugeot in the LMP1 Manufacturers' Cup, while Corvette's class victory moved it past BMW and Ferrari for the LMGTE Manufacturers' Cup lead. Audi Sport Team Joest took over the LMP1 Teams' Cup lead from Peugeot Sport Total, and Larbre overtook Proton Competition for the LMGTE Am Teams' Cup lead. Signatech and AF Corse maintained their advantage in the LMP2 and LMGTE Pro Teams' Cups, respectively, with four rounds remaining in the season.

== Background ==
The 24 Hours of Le Mans began in 1923 when automotive journalist Charles Faroux, the Automobile Club de l'Ouest (ACO) general secretary Georges Durand, and the industrialist Emile Coquile agreed to hold a test of vehicle reliability and durability. The 24 Hours of Le Mans is considered one of the world's most prestigious motor races and is part of the Triple Crown of Motorsport. The race's 79th iteration was held on 11 and 12 June 2011 at the 13.629 km (8.469 mi) Circuit de la Sarthe, near Le Mans, France. It was the third of seven automobile endurance races in the 2011 Intercontinental Le Mans Cup.

Peugeot led the LMP1 Manufacturers' Cup with 55 points, 17 ahead of second-place Audi after winning the 1000 km of Spa six weeks earlier. BMW led the LMGTE Manufacturers Cup with 49 points, 11 more than second-placed Ferrari and 14 more than third-place Corvette. Peugeot Sport led the LMP1 Teams' Cup with 27 points, followed by Audi Sport Team Joest, Team Oreca, and Rebellion Racing, each 19, 18, and 12 points. Signatech Nissan led the LMP2 Teams' Cup with 22 points, and OAK Racing was second with four less. AF Corse led the LMGTE Pro Teams' Cup, with 27 points, followed by BMW Motorsport, with 26 points. Proton Competition led the LMGTE Am standings with 24 points, followed by Krohn Racing with 21 points.

== Regulation changes ==
The ACO authored the 2011 regulations to respect the environment and support sustainable development by encouraging the use of new technologies and techniques that reduce carbon emissions and fuel consumption. Le Mans Prototype (LMP) cars could now be equipped with four-wheel or kinetic energy recovery system hybrid powertrains, to recover energy otherwise lost by braking, exhaust, or heat generated by the engine and suspension dampers. Each hybrid system was limited to 500 kW (670 hp) between braking zones, and driver aids such as push-to-pass were prohibited. The ACO reduced fuel capacity for petrol and diesel vehicles and decreased engine sizes for turbocharged and diesel engines. To reduce lift, all prototype cars had to weigh 900 kg (2,000 lb) and have vertical fins atop the engine cover.

The second-tier Le Mans Prototype 2 (LMP2) category was overhauled to keep costs low and affordable for privateer entries. All LMP2 vehicles had to be equipped with production-series engines, with the required engine life gradually increasing over the following three years from 30 hours to 50 hours. 2010 LMP2 cars could be entered until 2013, but they had to be 20 kg (44 lb) heavier than 2011 vehicles, with no bodywork modifications permitted and made slower than all 2011-specification cars. Each LMP2 team had to sign at least one silver or bronze-rated driver.

The ACO dropped the LM GT1 category and created a single set of regulations for the GT Endurance category, which was divided into two classes: LM GTE Pro and LM GTE Am, based on 2009 LMGT2 rules. This was done to avoid multiple calendar clashes with several other racing series and because there were few entrants in the class other than the Le Mans race, as well as the category being exclusively for short-distance sprints. The LM GTE Pro category featured new cars that could be driven by any driver, whereas the LM GTE Am class featured one-year-old cars driven by a minimum of two Fédération Internationale de l'Automobile (FIA) silver or bronze licensed drivers per team.

== Entries ==
The ACO received 71 applications by the entry deadline, 19 January 2011. Its eight-member Selection Committee granted 56 invitations to the race, and entries were divided between the LMP1, LMP2, LMGTE Pro, and LMGTE Am categories on 25 January. 40 per cent of the applications were for entry to the LMGTE Am class.

=== Automatic entries ===
Teams received automatic entries based on their results in the 2010 24 Hours of Le Mans, or Le Mans-based series and events such as the Intercontinental Le Mans Cup (ILMC), the American Le Mans Series (ALMS), the Le Mans Series (LMS), and the Petit Le Mans, and the Michelin Green X Challenge. Because teams received automatic entries, they could change their cars from the previous year to the next, but not their category. Automatic invitations in the two GTE categories could be swapped based on the driver line-ups chosen by those teams. As the ALMS did not differentiate between the Pro and Am categories, only a single GTE invitation was granted to their entries.

On 3 December 2010, the ACO announced the list of automatic entries.

Automatic entries for the 2011 24 Hours of Le Mans
Reason Entered	LMP1	LMP2	LMGTE	
Result in the 2010 24 Hours of Le Mans	(Germany) Audi Sport North America	(United Kingdom) Strakka Racing	(Germany) Team Felbermayr-Proton	(France) Luc Alphand Aventures
Result in the 2010 24 Hours of Le Mans	(Germany) Audi Sport Team Joest	(France) OAK Racing	(Germany) Hankook Team Farnbacher	(France) Larbre Compétition
Result in the Le Mans Series	(France) Team Oreca Matmut	(United Kingdom) RML	(Germany) Team Felbermayr-Proton	(France) Larbre Compétition
Result in the Le Mans Series	(France) Signature Plus	(United Kingdom) Strakka Racing	(Italy) AF Corse	(France) Larbre Compétition
Result in the 2010 Petit Le Mans	(France) Team Peugeot Total	(France) OAK Racing	(United States) Corvette Racing	
Result in the American Le Mans Series	N/A	(United States) Patrón Highcroft Racing	(United States) Flying Lizard Motorsports	
Result in the American Le Mans Series	N/A	(United States) Muscle Milk Team Cytosport	(United States) Risi Competizione	
Result in the Intercontinental Le Mans Cup	(France) Team Peugeot Total	(France) OAK Racing	(Germany) Team Felbermayr-Proton	
Result in the Michelin Green X Challenge		(France) OAK Racing	(France) IMSA Performance Matmut	

=== Entry list and reserves ===
The ACO announced the full 56-car entry list and 10-vehicle reserve list at a press conference at Radio France's headquarters in Paris, on the afternoon of 9 February, in conjunction with the announcement of entries for the 2011 ILMC, In addition to the 26 full-season entries from the ILMC, the field included ALMS and LMS entries, along with one-off entries competing only at Le Mans. The ACO initially nominated ten reserves: two from LMP1, three from LMP2, and the remaining five from the two LMGTE classes. Withdrawals after 1 February were replaced class-by-class: an LMGTE entry would be replaced by another LMGTE car, and an LMP vehicle replaced by another LMP entry.

Signatech Nissan withdrew its second vehicle, the No. 27 Oreca 03-Nissan, from the entry list on 12 April. Consequently, the ACO promoted the No. 44 Extrême Limite AM Paris Norma MP200P-Judd BMW car to the race; and the Kronos Racing Lola-Aston Martin entry moved to first on the reserve list. The Pegasus Racing and Rangoni Motorsport entries were subsequently removed from the reserve list. The Highcroft Racing team withdrew its LMP1 ARX-01e-Honda car on 16 May, citing a lack of financial support as the reason, while also announcing the end of their partnership with Honda and HPD, due to the 2011 Tōhoku earthquake and tsunami. The Kronos Racing Lola-Aston Martin was then promoted to the entry list. At the start of the event, the No. 69 Robertson Racing Ford GT-R-Doran and the No. 86 Young Driver AMR Vantage were the two cars still on the reserve list.

== Testing and practice ==
For the 2011 race, the test session was reintroduced to Le Mans for the first time since 2008 to allow manufacturers and teams enough time to develop the new technologies on their cars by the ACO's aim to improve safety. On April 24, seven weeks before the race, two four-hour test sessions were held. During testing, there were 54 cars from the race entry and reserve lists, including three Formula Le Mans-class Oreca-FLM09s from Hope Racing, Genoa Racing, and JMB Racing. The United States-based Flying Lizard Motorsports, Highcroft Racing, and Krohn teams did not participate in the test due to cost and logistics. The European-based JMW Motorsport, Prospeed Competition, Quifel-ASM Team, and Strakka Racing squads also did not participate in the test session.

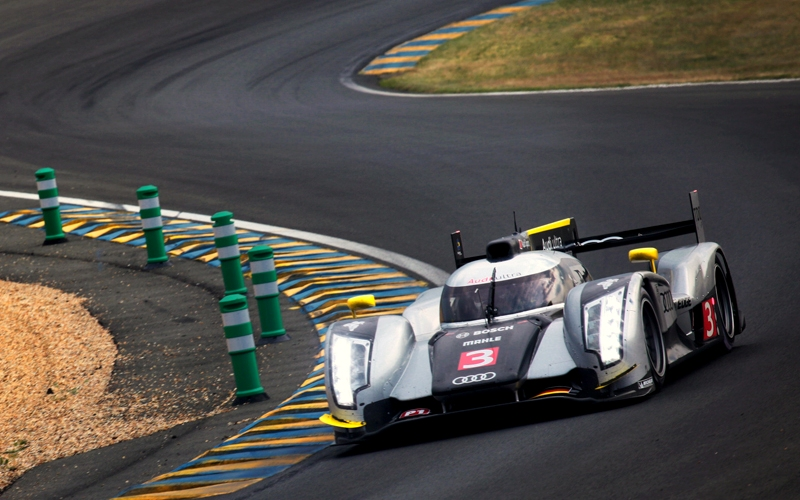
The No. 3 Audi was fastest in testing with a lap from Tom Kristensen.

Romain Dumas set the fastest time in the first test session in the No. 1 Audi R18 TDI—with a lap of 3:27.900. His teammate Tom Kristensen—in the sister No. 3 Audi—improved that time to 3:27.687 in the second session. Mike Rockenfeller followed, two-tenths of a second behind, in second place, while the fastest Peugeot 908 car was the No. 8 of Stéphane Sarrazin, in third. André Lotterer's No. 2 Audi was fourth, with Sébastien Bourdais's No. 7 Peugeot fifth, and the No. 10 Team Oreca Matmut Peugeot 908 HDi FAP sixth after a lap from Loïc Duval. The fastest non-diesel LMP1 car was Emmanuel Collard's eighth-place No. 16 Pescarolo. The time of 3:42.992 set by Franck Mailleux for Signatech led LMP2 with the Oreca-Nissans, ahead of Alexandre Prémat's No. 48 Team Oreca Matmut car and Alex Brundle's No. 41 Greaves Motorsport entry. Allan Simonsen, in the No. 89 Hankook Team Farnbacher Ferrari 458 Italia, was the only driver to go below the 4-minute mark in LMGTE Pro, with a 3:59.966 lap to top the class. Tommy Milner helped Larbre Compétition's Chevrolet Corvette C6.R to the lead in LMGTE Am with a 4:04.222 lap. Separate incidents led to disruptions during practice: Dominik Kraihamer at Arnage corner, Andrea Belicchi on the Mulsanne Straight with a fractured right-rear toe link, and Guy Smith in the gravel trap at the PlayStation chicane due to a broken front toe link.

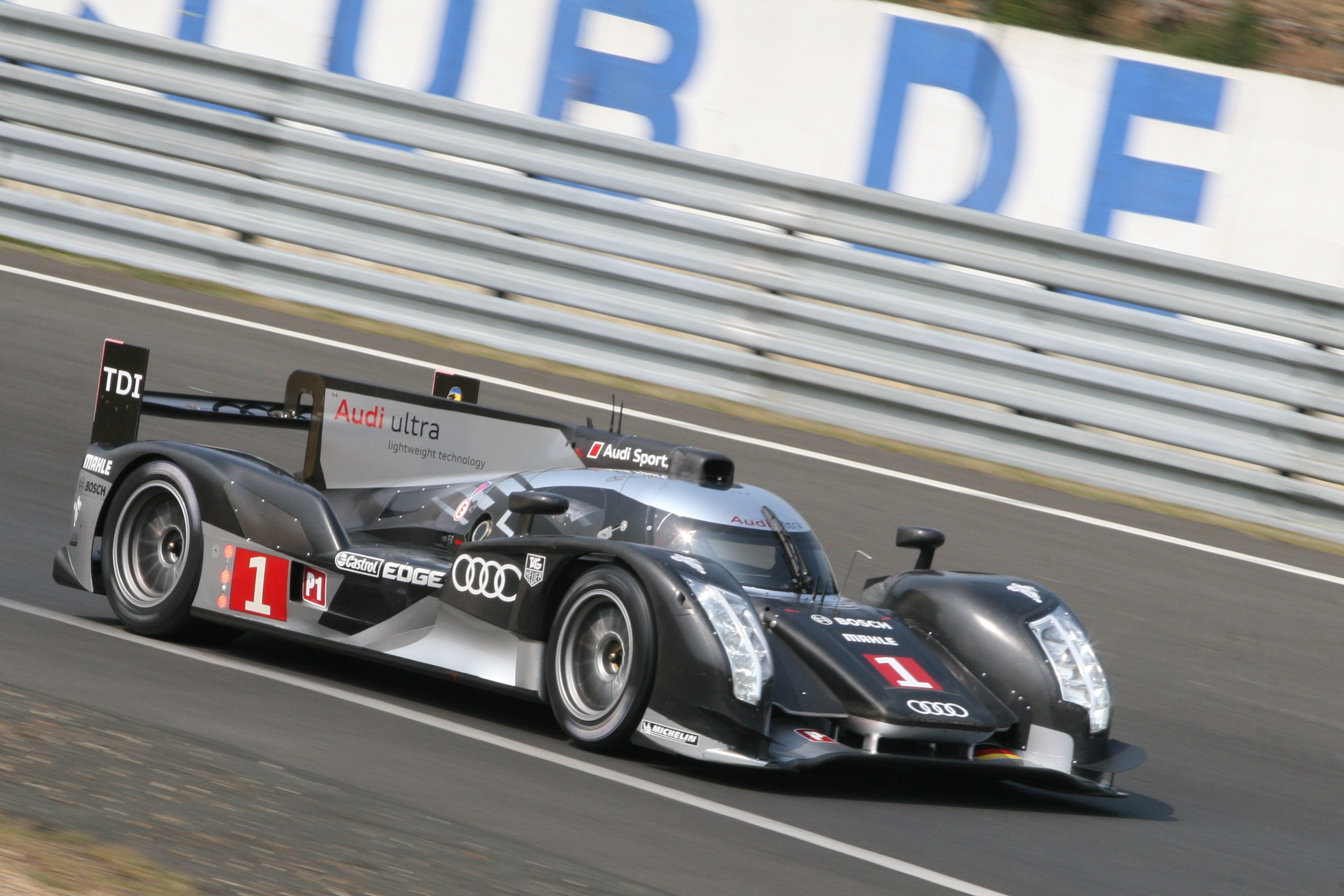
Audi's No. 1 car was fastest in official practice from Mike Rockenfeller.

Official practice was held on 8 June with the full 56-car field on track for four hours. Audi and Peugeot's drivers traded fastest laps until the fastest overall time was a 3:27.986 lap set by Rockenfeller's No. 1 Audi, three-tenths of a second ahead of Lotterer's No. 2 entry. Bourdais was the highest-placed Peugeot driver in third, followed by Alexander Wurz's No. 7 vehicle and Allan McNish's No. 3 Audi. Jonny Kane's No. 42 Strakka HPD ARX-01d led LMP2 with a 3:42.863 lap, ahead of Prémat's No. 48 Oreca Matumt entry and Signatech's Soheil Ayari. The No. 55 BMW M3 GT2 led LMGTE Pro, with the sister No. 56 vehicle of Andy Priaulx second. Despite a dislodged power steering hose, Jan Magnussen's third-place No. 74 Corvette was the fastest non-BMW car. Fabien Giroix in Gulf AMR Middle East's No. 61 Aston Martin Vantage GT2 lapped fastest in LMGTE Am, ahead of Flying Lizard's No. 81 Porsche 997 GT3-RSR of Darren Law. Raymond Narac's No. 76 IMSA Performance Matmut Porsche was severely damaged against the tyre wall in the Porsche Curves' first part and stopped in the gravel trap, stopping practice for 18 minutes. Roger Wills, driving CRS Racing's No. 62 Ferrari F430 GT2, struck the barrier exiting the Porsche Curves and damaged the car's front-left suspension and radiator just before mid-point.

== Qualifying ==
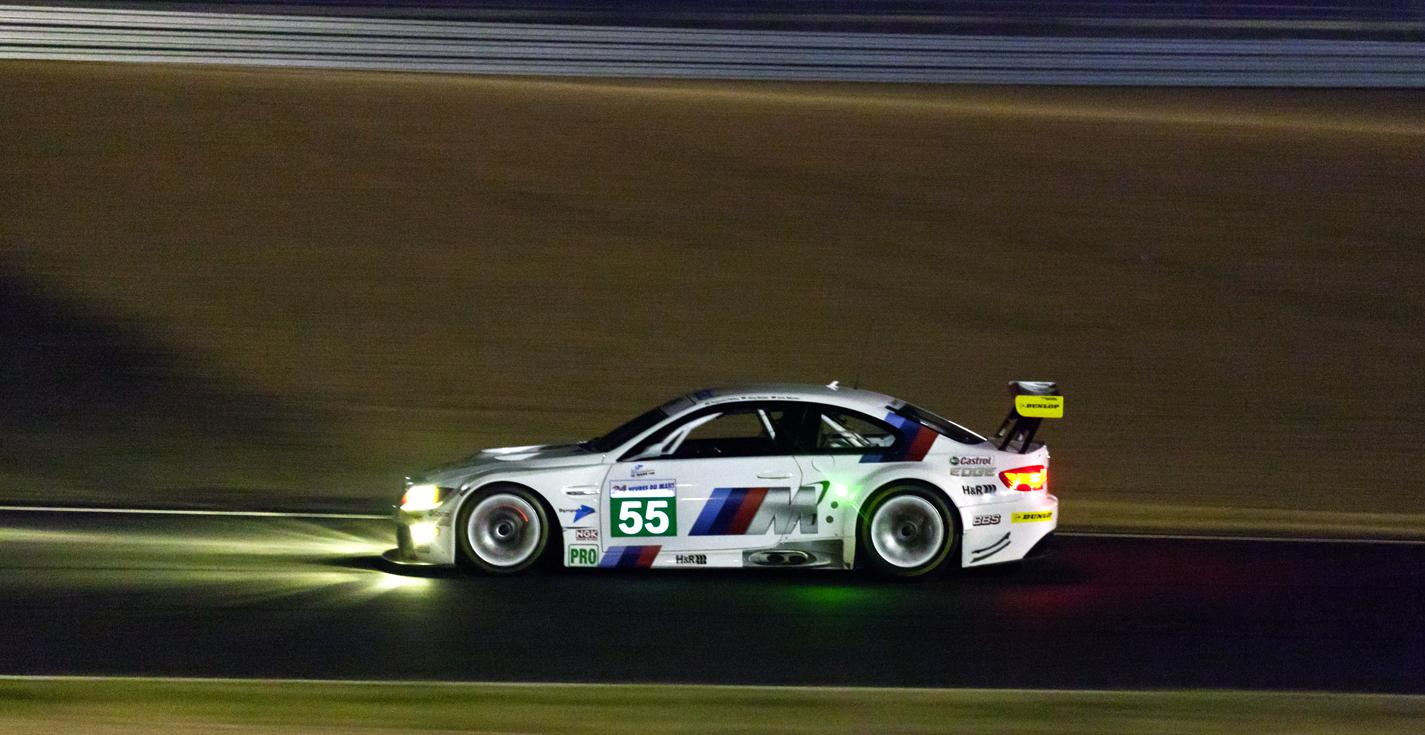
The No. 55 BMW M3 GT2 was qualified on pole position in LMGTE Pro by Augusto Farfus

The first of three, two-hour qualifying sessions to determine the race's starting order through the quickest lap times set by each team's fastest driver began late on a cool and dry 8 June night. Audi led from the start with a flying lap from McNish, followed by Rockenfeller, and then Lotterer leading overall. Sarrazin's 3:27.033 lap, set with half an hour remaining, put the No. 8 Peugeot on provisional pole position, which it held to the session's conclusion. The next three positions were taken by a trio of Audis driven by Lotterer, Rockenfeller, and Kristensen. Wurz was the next fastest Peugeot in fifth after being slowed by traffic in the final third of the lap. Bourdais, his teammate, was provisionally sixth. Collard, driving the No. 16 Pescarolo, was eighth among the petrol-powered LMP1 entries. Dumas exited Mulsanne corner at speed and collided side-on with the right-hand corner in the door area of Roald Goethe's stopped No. 60 Aston Martin, which had spun earlier. Both drivers were unhurt, and qualifying was stopped for five minutes. Kane put Strakka's car on provisional pole in LMP2, with a 3:42.615 lap almost 40 minutes in, ahead of Mailleux's Singatech, Premat's Oreca Matmut, and Tom Kimber-Smith's Greaves entries. At approximately 195 km/h (121 mph) and 9.4 G, Nick Leventis crashed the Strakka car backwards into the tyre barrier just before the Dunlop Bridge, scattering debris on the track and concluding the session with 30 seconds left. The professional class of LMGTE saw BMW lead with a flying lap from Priaulx's No. 56 car, ahead of Gianmaria Bruni's No. 51 Ferrari and Augusto Farfus's sister No. 55 BMW, with the first eight separated by 1.572 seconds. Jean-Philippe Belloc helped Porsche top LMGTE Am, ahead of Spencer Pumpelly's Flying Lizard and Giroix's Gulf AMR Middle East's Aston Martin entries.

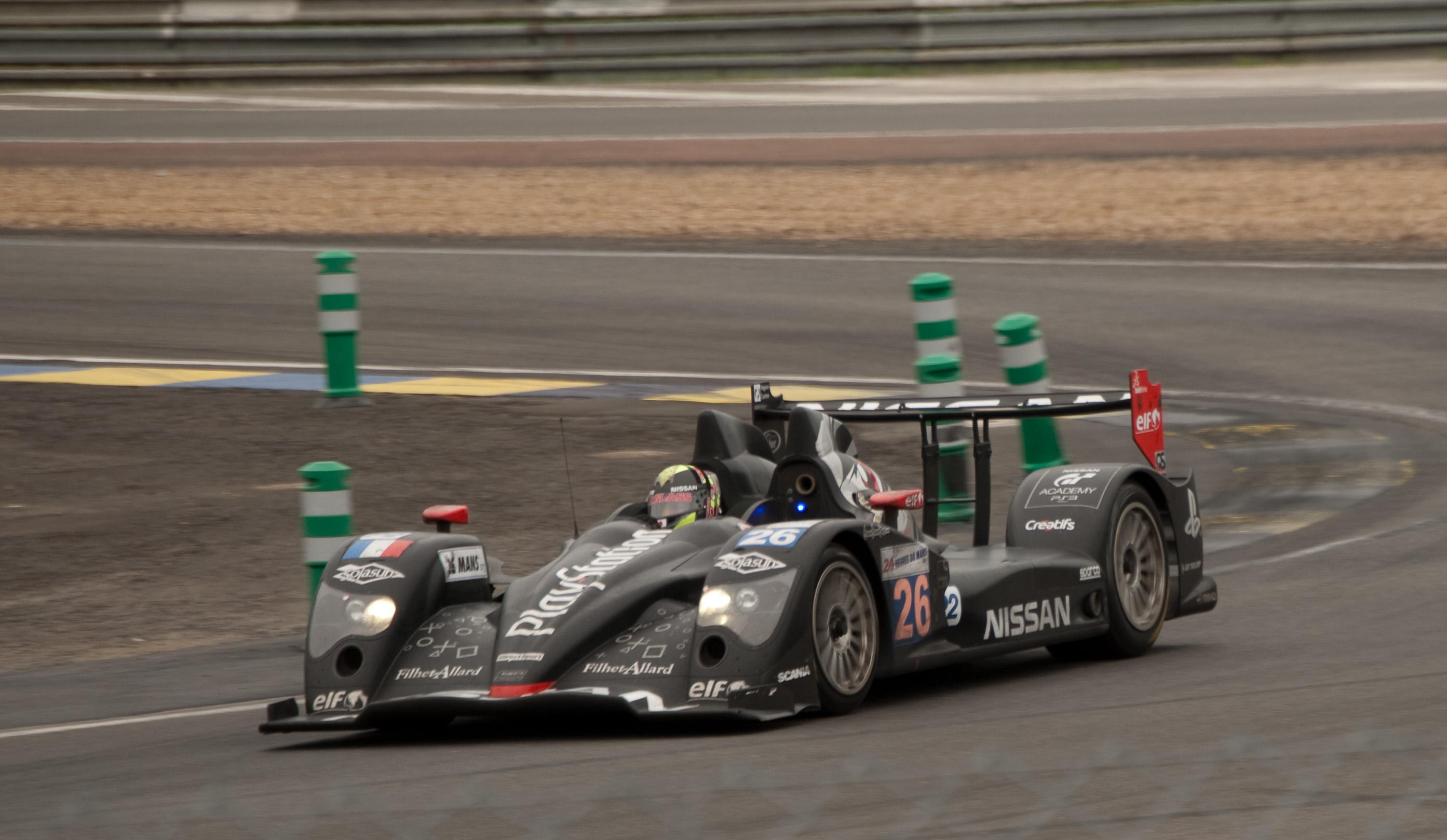
A second qualifying session lap from put the No. 26 Signatech Oreca 03 car on pole position in LMP2

Strakka reconstructed its car overnight after the first session and changed its programme to allow their drivers to acclimatise to race conditions. The IMSA Performance Porsche was able to resume competitive racing after being transported and rebuilt overnight at the team's headquarters in Rouen, Normandy. Sarrazin improved his provisional pole time to 3:26.336 and then to a 3:26.156 lap in the second qualifying session. Marcel Fässler then overtook Sarrazin to move the No. 2 Audi to first with a 3:25.961 lap, which he held until the session ended. The No. 8 Peugeot was demoted to second as the sister No. 7 car improved to third after a lap from Marc Gené. McNish kept Audi's No. 3 entry in fourth, with Dumas' No. 1 car falling to fifth and Franck Montagny staying sixth for the No. 9 Peugeot team. Ayari reset LMP2's quickest lap time to a 3:41.458 second for Signatech. Premat improved the Oreca Matmut car, while Pierre Kaffer moved the PeCom Lola-Judd entry to second and third in class, respectively. In LMGTE Pro, AF Corse led the session and claimed provisional pole position with Bruni's quickest class lap, demoting Jörg Müller's No. 55 BMW. Similarly, AF Corse's No. 61 Ferrari of Marco Cioci improved the LMGTE Am pole position lap, with Horst Felbermayr Jr moving the Felbermayr-Proton Porsche to second in class. During the session, which saw several cars affected by mechanical issues, Priaulx lost control of the No. 56 BMW at the Ford Chicane, after possibly driving over debris or gravel, and crashed into the outside tyre barrier.

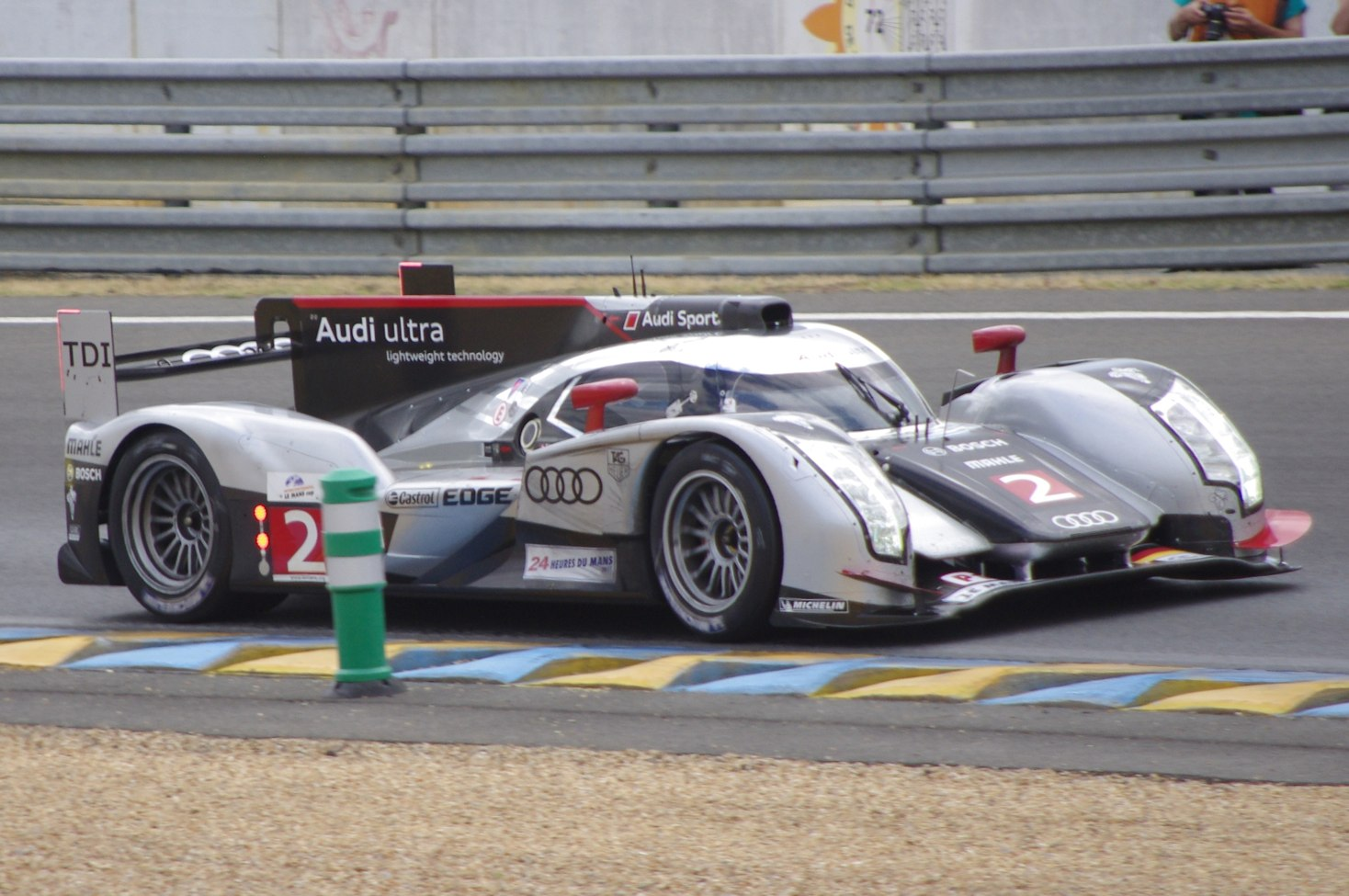
Benoît Tréluyer qualified the No. 2 Audi on pole position in the final qualifying session.

In the third session, Dumas, in the No. 1 Audi, bested the No. 2 car's provisional pole lap before Benoît Tréluyer reset the fastest time to a 3:25.738, achieving Audi's first overall pole position at Le Mans since 2006. Dumas gained the No. 1 entry to join Tréluyer's No. 2 vehicle on the grid's front row while Simon Pagenaud qualified the No. 9 Peugeot third. Nicolas Minassian put the No. 8 Peugeot fourth, Kristensen qualified the No. 3 Audi fifth, with the No. 7 Peugeot of Anthony Davidson sixth. Early in the session, Davidson spun the No. 7 Peugeot in the Ford Chicane before Kristensen lost control of the No. 3 Audi upon a kerb and crashed in the Tetre Rouge gravel trap. Signatech's second-session lap did not improve on Ayari's lap, securing Ayari LMP2 pole position. Strakka could not best Kane's lap, so it started second in LMP2, with Oreca Matmut beginning third. Farfus improved the LMGTE Pro pole lap, and the No. 55 BMW led the class until the session's conclusion. The No. 51 Ferrari began from second, as the No. 56 BMW fell to third after not being able to partake in the session following Priaulx's second-session accident. Cioci lapped faster to earn AF Corse the inaugural LMGTE Am pole position. The session was halted for 20 minutes when Anthony Beltoise crashed the No. 58 Luxury Racing Ferrari at Mulsanne Corner after hitting oil and Christian Klien, in the No. 009 Aston Martin AMR-One, picked up a left-rear puncture, prompting the laying of cement dust on the racing line.

=== Qualifying results ===
Pole position winners in each class are indicated in bold. The fastest time set by each entry is denoted in grey.

Final qualifying classification
Pos	No.	Class	Team	Car	Qualifying 1	Qualifying 2	Qualifying 3	Gap	Grid
1	**2**	**LMP1**	**Audi Sport Team Joest**	**Audi R18 TDI**	**3:27.939**	**3:25.931**	**3:25.738**	—	**1**
2	1	LMP1	Audi Sport Team Joest	Audi R18 TDI	3:27.949	3:27.697	3:25.799	+0.061	2
3	9	LMP1	Team Peugeot Total	Peugeot 908	3:29.466	3:28.739	3:26.010	+0.272	3
4	8	LMP1	Peugeot Sport Total	Peugeot 908	3:27.033	3:26.156	3:30.482	+0.418	4
5	3	LMP1	Audi Sport North America	Audi R18 TDI	3:28.301	3:27.602	3:26.165	+0.427	5
6	7	LMP1	Peugeot Sport Total	Peugeot 908	3:28.796	3:26.272	3:29.464	+0.534	6
7	10	LMP1	Team Oreca Matmut	Peugeot 908 HDi FAP	3:30.084	3:30.828	3:31.289	+4.346	7
8	12	LMP1	Rebellion Racing	Lola B10/60-Toyota	3:37.404	3:33.982	3:32.883	+7.145	8
9	16	LMP1	Pescarolo Team	Pescarolo 01-Judd	3:35.456	3:33.066	3:36.882	+7.328	9
10	13	LMP1	Rebellion Racing	Lola B10/60-Toyota	3:38.351	3:34.892	3:34.573	+8.835	10
11	15	LMP1	OAK Racing	OAK Pescarolo 01-Judd	3:39.672	3:34.933	3:35.543	+9.195	11
12	22	LMP1	Kronos Racing	Lola-Aston Martin B09/60	3:44.415	3:36.551	3:37.528	+10.813	12
13	20	LMP1	Quifel-ASM Team	Zytek 09SC	3:41.019	3:37.393	3:37.785	+11.655	13
14	**26**	**LMP2**	**Signatech Nissan**	**Oreca 03-Nissan**	**3:43.124**	**3:41.458**	**3:46.710**	**+15.720**	**14**
15	24	LMP1	OAK Racing	OAK Pescarolo 01-Judd	3:48.852	3:41.908	3:46.327	+16.170	15
16	42	LMP2	Strakka Racing	HPD ARX-01d	3:42.615	3:45.041	No Time	+16.877	16
17	48	LMP2	Team Oreca Matmut	Oreca 03-Nissan	3:43.654	3:43.098	3:43.438	+17.360	17
18	39	LMP2	PeCom Racing	Lola B11/40-Judd BMW	3:45.997	3:43.223	3:45.476	+17.485	18
19	49	LMP2	OAK Racing	OAK Pescarolo 01-Judd BMW	3:48.211	3:45.297	3:43.479	+17.741	19
20	41	LMP2	Greaves Motorsport	Z11SN-Nissan	3:43.814	3:45.982	3:43.802	+18.064	20
21	40	LMP2	Race Performance	Oreca 03-Judd BMW	3:44.294	3:48.603	3:45.476	+18.556	21
22	007	LMP1	Aston Martin Racing	Aston Martin AMR-One	3:56.847	3:46.450	3:45.918	+20.180	22
23	36	LMP2	RML	HPD ARX-01d	3:47.308	3:48.765	3:48.324	+21.570	23
24	5	LMP1	Hope Racing	Oreca Swiss HY Tech-Hybrid	3:47.691	3:50.495	No Time	+21.953	24
25	009	LMP1	Aston Martin Racing	Aston Martin AMR-One	3:56.637	3:48.355	3:57.025	+22.617	25
26	44	LMP2	Extrême Limite AM Paris	Norma MP200P-Judd BMW	3:51.438	3:48.420	4:08.626	+22.682	26
27	35	LMP2	OAK Racing	OAK Pescarolo 01-Judd BMW	3:57.453	3:48.665	3:53.008	+22.927	27
28	33	LMP2	Level 5 Motorsports	Lola B08/80-HPD	3:51.149	3:57.072	3:48.863	+23.125	28
29	**55**	**LM GTE Pro**	**BMW Motorsport**	**BMW M3 GT2**	**3:59.321**	**3:59.426**	**3:57.592**	**+31.854**	**29**
30	51	LM GTE Pro	AF Corse SRL	Ferrari 458 Italia GT2	3:58.989	3:58.040	3:58.454	+32.302	30
31	56	LM GTE Pro	BMW Motorsport	BMW M3 GT2	3:58.426	4:01.190	No Time	+32.688	31
32	74	LM GTE Pro	Corvette Racing	Chevrolet Corvette C6.R	3:59.519	4:00.087	4:00.535	+33.781	32
33	89	LM GTE Pro	Hankook Team Farnbacher	Ferrari 458 Italia GT2	4:00.260	3:59.519	4:00.845	+33.781	33
34	73	LM GTE Pro	Corvette Racing	Chevrolet Corvette C6.R	3:59.633	4:01.626	4:03.800	+33.895	34
35	77	LM GTE Pro	Team Felbermayr-Proton	Porsche 997 GT3-RSR	3:59.998	3:59.662	4:06.917	+33.924	35
36	59	LM GTE Pro	Luxury Racing	Ferrari 458 Italia GT2	3:59.901	4:01.015	No Time	+34.163	36
37	75	LM GTE Pro	Prospeed Competition	Porsche 997 GT3-RSR	3:59.962	4:03.521	4:04.143	+34.224	37
38	79	LM GTE Pro	Jota	Aston Martin V8 Vantage GT2	4:00.747	4:00.921	4:06.208	+35.009	38
39	66	LM GTE Pro	JMW Motorsport	Ferrari 458 Italia GT2	4:06.884	4:00.890	4:03.321	+35.152	39
40	80	LM GTE Pro	Flying Lizard Motorsports	Porsche 997 GT3-RSR	4:01.480	4:03.128	4:01.024	+35.286	40
41	58	LM GTE Pro	Luxury Racing	Ferrari 458 Italia GT2	4:02.017	4:01.176	4:03.940	+35.438	41
42	**61**	**LM GTE Am**	**AF Corse SRL**	**Ferrari F430 GTE**	**4:10.316**	**4:02.539**	**4:01.282**	**+35.544**	**42**
43	88	LM GTE Pro	Team Felbermayr-Proton	Porsche 997 GT3-RSR	4:02.049	4:03.613	4:01.752	+36.014	43
44	71	LM GTE Pro	AF Corse	Ferrari 458 Italia GT2	4:08.213	4:02.216	4:18.744	+36.478	44
45	76	LM GTE Pro	IMSA Performance Matmut	Porsche 997 GT3-RSR	No Time	4:06.438	4:02.548	+36.810	45
46	63	LM GTE Am	Proton Competition	Porsche 997 GT3-RSR	4:05.154	4:03.532	No Time	+37.794	46
47	81	LM GTE Am	Flying Lizard Motorsports	Porsche 997 GT3-RSR	4:04.747	4:05.440	4:03.648	+37.910	47
48	70	LM GTE Am	Larbre Compétition	Porsche 997 GT3-RSR	4:03.918	4:07.261	4:13.895	+38.180	48
49	83	LM GTE Am	JMB Racing	Ferrari F430 GTE	4:10.335	4:06.513	4:04.640	+38.902	49
50	60	LM GTE Am	Gulf AMR Middle East	Aston Martin V8 Vantage GT2	4:04.825	4:05.522	4:08.922	+39.087	50
51	57	LM GTE Am	Krohn Racing	Ferrari F430 GTE	4:05.856	4:08.388	4:05.211	+39.473	51
52	50	LM GTE Am	Larbre Compétition	Chevrolet Corvette C6.R	4:05.955	4:26.036	4:13.623	+40.217	52
53	62	LM GTE Am	CRS Racing	Ferrari F430 GTE	4:26.249	4:07.236	4:18.494	+41.498	53
54	65	LM GTE Pro	Lotus Jetalliance	Lotus Evora GTE	4:07.465	No Time	No Time	+41.727	54
55	68	LM GTE Am	Robertson Racing LLC	Ford GT-R Mk. VII	No Time	4:08.208	4:11.421	+42.470	55
56	64	LM GTE Pro	Lotus Jetalliance	Lotus Evora GTE	4:17.379	4:12.569	4:26.142	+46.831	56

== Warm-up ==
A 45-minute warm-up session took place at 09:00 local time on 11 June in cloudy conditions without rain. Bourdais' No. 9 Peugeot set the fastest lap—3:27.228—just before the session's end. Tréluyer was second-fastest, with his Audi teammates Timo Bernhard and Kristensen third and fourth. Mallieux's Signatech entry led LMP2 with a 3:43.449 lap. AF Corse's LMGTE Pro Ferrari of Toni Vilander led that class, while Niclas Jönsson's Krohn Ferrari led LMGTE Am. Rui Águas stopped AF Corse's No. 71 Ferrari at Mulsanne corner with a suspected differential issue. Kaffer continued straight on at the Arnage turn and restarted the PeCom car to continue his race preparations.

== Race ==
=== Start to early evening ===
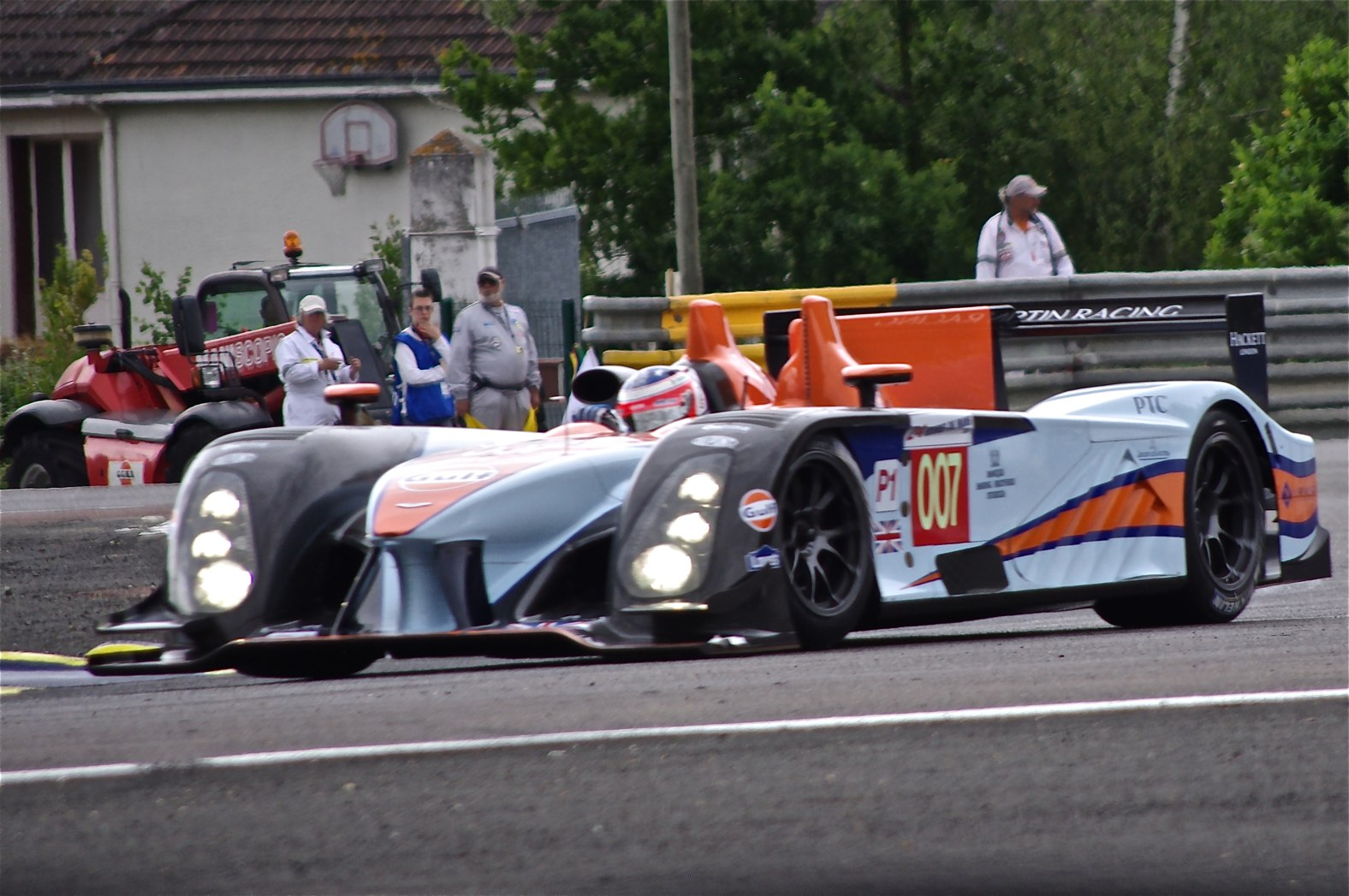
Both of the Aston Martin AMR-One LMP1 cars were retired in the first hour of the event

Pre-race weather was dry and clear with the air temperature between 8 and 18 °C (46 and 64 °F) and the track temperature between 14.5 and 28.6 °C (58.1 and 83.5 °F). The race began with a rolling start at 15:00 local time, with FIA President Jean Todt waving the French Tricolour from the starter's gantry in front of 249,500 spectators. Tréluyer led the 56-car field for the first ten laps. His teammate McNish passed Bourdais for fourth before the Mulsanne Straight and Montagny on the outside at the PlayStation chicane after a five-lap duel that saw Montagny put McNish towards the pit lane wall. Aston Martin Racing lost both of its LMP1-class AMR Ones during the first hour when Darren Turner got the No. 009 car stuck in the first Mulsanne chicane gravel and Adrián Fernández brought the No. 007 car into the garage with unrepairable broken engine aluminium alternator pulleys breaking the pulley-linked drive alternator and water pump gear. Bruni moved Ferrari's No. 51 car to the LMGTE Pro lead followed by Oliver Gavin's No. 74 Corvette in second after passing Farfus which he held until Farfus reclaimed the position.

Mallieux's Signatech car forfeited the LMP2 lead it had held since the start, to Prémat's No. 48 Oreca entry after 34 minutes, due to a left-rear puncture that damaged the bodywork. The first hour ended with McNish passing Bernhard's slowing No. 1 Audi for the lead on the inside, past the Dunlop Bridge, before Beltoise was caught off guard and collided with the rear of the No. 3 car in the high speed right-hand Esses. McNish went backwards through the gravel, striking the outside tyre wall at high speed, through a gap designed to allow cars to be moved to a safer location beyond the gravel, and landing upside down on its side. The impact destroyed the Audi and sent debris flying through the inside catch fence across a group of photographers. McNish was unhurt as the marshals turned the Audi upright. He was transported to the infield medical centre and then to a local hospital for tests that cleared him. The safety cars were deployed for 72 minutes as marshals worked to repair the damaged walls. Under safety car conditions, Montagny brought the No. 8 Peugeot into the garage earlier than scheduled to rectify a stuck vehicle brake-balance distribution unit in the rearmost area, and it rejoined the race in eighth with Sarrazin driving.

When racing resumed, Nick Tandy's No. 88 Felbermayr Porsche lapped faster than Corvette's Olivier Beretta and overtook him for second in LMGTE Pro. Tréluyer maintained the lead until a pit stop cycle saw his teammate Bernhard temporarily move past him, as the cars made pit stops in numerical order. Bernhard had driven over a kerb, damaging the No. 1 Audi's nose line while lapping a slower GT car, reducing the available downforce. Following separate overtakes on the Mulsanne Straight, Tréluyer and Wurz demoted Bernhard to third. Bernhard fell to fifth after Audi brought the No. 1 car into the pit lane for a replacement front nose. The LMP2 lead was contested between Prémat and, later, Kraihamer's Oreca and Danny Watts' Strakka car, which was gaining on the Oreca. Jörg Müller No. 55 BMW's lost third in LMGTE Pro, due to a right-rear puncture that required it to enter the garage, dropping him two laps behind the class leader. Pagenaud lost control of the No. 9 Peugeot and went straight at Arnage turn, forcing him to steer the car around to rejoin the circuit.

Davidson took the lead in the No. 7 Porsche from Fässler's No. 2 Audi since his car could go longer between pit stops. Dumas was recovering lost ground in the No. 1 Audi when he lost control while lapping the LMGTE Am-category No. 71 Porsche on the inside at Tetre Rouge; he maintained the car's hold on fourth. AF Corse lost third in LMGTE Pro to Antonio García's No. 73 Corvette because Vilander required trackside recovery to return his Ferrari to the circuit after going into the gravel trap at Mulsanne Corner. Matías Russo overtook Leventis's Strakka car for third in LMP2. Davidson's No. 7 Peugeot and Fässler's No. 2 Audi exchanged the race lead during the sixth hour until Fässler was able to establish a minute's lead over every other car. Due to the length of the track, the distance between the LMGTE Am class leader and sixth in category became just over a minute, involving the Flying Lizard, Krohn, AF Corse, and Larbre teams.

=== Night to dawn ===
As night began to fall, Rockenfeller's No. 1 Audi overtook Lamy's No. 9 Peugeot for third place after Lamy had been affected by a door repeatedly flapping open, as Lotterer and Gené continued to duel for the race lead. Priaulx relinquished the No. 56 BMW's hold on second in LMGTE Pro, due to an engine misfire requiring changing the engine control unit and ignition coil. LMGTE Am saw the two Larbre entries—the No. 70 Corvette and the No. 50 Porsche—duel for the category lead with the Corvette consistently lapping faster than the Porsche. Gené fell back from Lotterer in the duel for the overall lead, and the No. 7 Peugeot was put under pressure by Rockenfeller's No. 1 Audi, which took second by causing Gené to drift wide onto the Arnage corner run-off area and lose 30 seconds in the eighth hour. Not long after, Rockenfeller was lapping the No. 71 Ferrari of Rob Kauffman at the second kink on the straight linking Mulsanne and the Indianapolis corner, when Kauffman drove into Rockenfeller's path and made contact with the rear of the No. 1 Audi. Rockenfeller's car was sent spearing left into the Armco barrier at high speed; The Audi and around 20 metres (66 ft) of barrier were destroyed, with the car recrossing the road, scattering much debris on it. The ACO ordered Kauffman to not partake in the remainder of the race, and Rockenfeller was kept in hospital overnight with a minor flesh wound to his right arm.

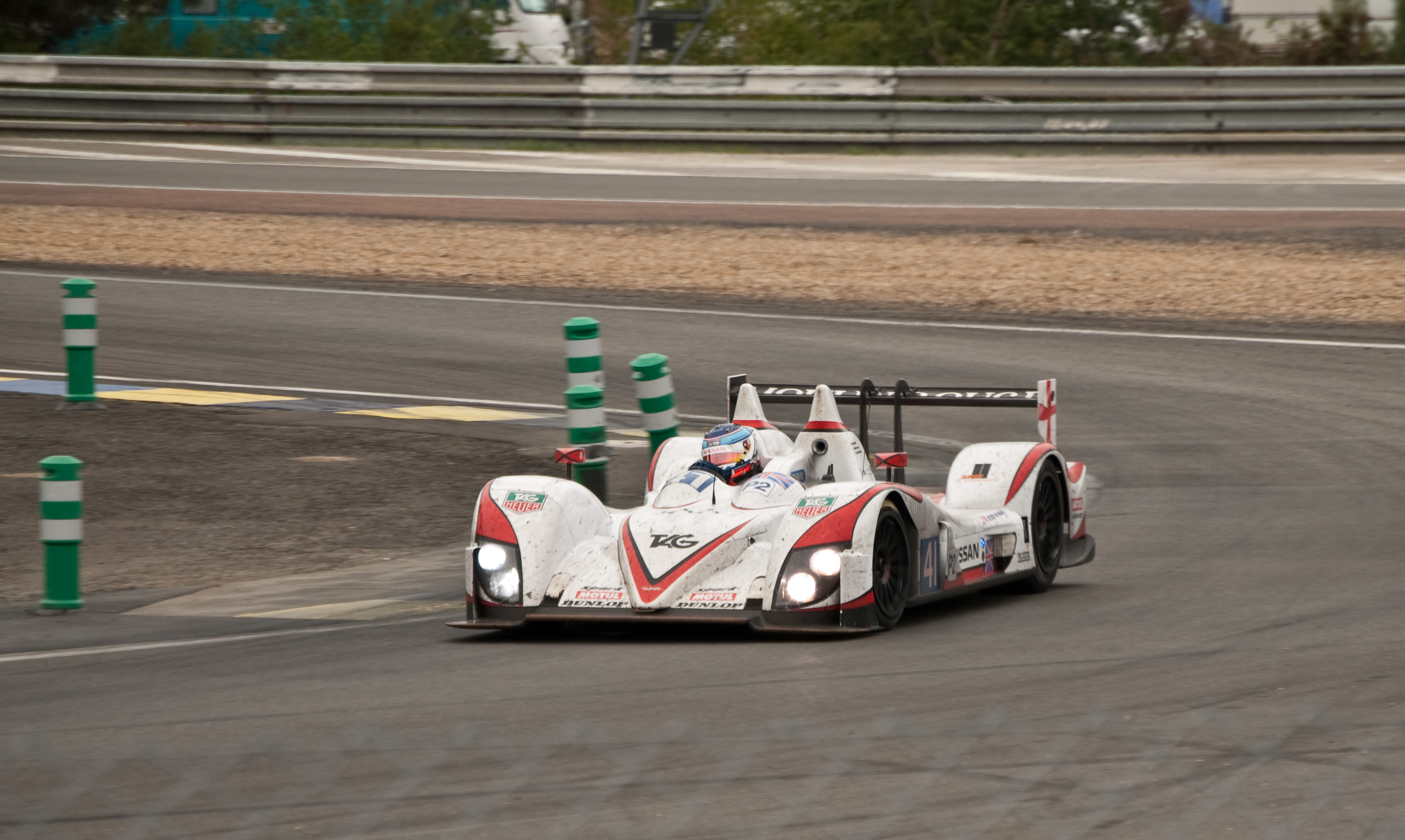
The LMP2-category winning No. 48 Zytek Z11SN entered by Greaves Motorsport and piloted by Tom Kimber-Smith, Olivier Lombard and Karim Ojjeh

The safety cars were deployed for the second time, for 2 hours, 22 minutes, to allow marshals to repair the damaged Armco barrier and remove debris. All of the leading prototype cars were driven into the pit lane for full-service pit stops. CRS brought their No. 62 Ferrari into the garage for new tyres, due to driver Shaun Lynn heavily damaging the vehicle's right-rear corner against the Ford Chicane barrier after losing control turning into the corner. The resulting damage included bodywork jamming the right-rear wheel against the fuel cell, causing an oil leak that Lynn repaired before the car's clutch burned out. When racing resumed, the sole remaining No. 2 Audi and the three Peugeots exchanged the lead several times over the following hours during pit stop cycles. Prémat relinquished the LMP2 lead, which the No. 48 Oreca had maintained for 96 laps, to the Greaves entry of Olivier Lombard, because of electrical issues that forced the Oreca's moving to the garage. The battle for second place in the LMGTE classes saw four drivers within twelve seconds of each other in Pro and three competitors within three seconds of one another in Am. Watts moved the Strakka LMP2 car to second in class, with successive overtakes of Russo and Kraihamer.

Two cars that were among the top three in LMP2 retired. Russo lost control of the third-place PeCom car in the Porsche Curves when it suddenly drove right into the barrier. Watts' Strakka entry struck a kerb and damaged the car's front aerodynamics. Before Watts smelled oil and stopped the car at the first Mulsanne chicane due to a suspected oil cooler issue, a front nose cone change during a pit stop fixed the problem. Watts abandoned the car after telemetry determined that it should not be restarted. Kraihamer was lapping faster than Karim Ojjeh's No. 41 Greaves car and overtook him to reclaim the LMP2 lead in the No. 48 Oreca since he had made one fewer pit stop. When the Nos. 7 and 8 Peugeots exchanged third overall during a pit stop cycle, Ayari's Singatech car passed João Barbosa and for third in LMP2. Pagenaud and his teammate Davidson closed up to Fässler's No. 2 Audi and took first and second just before the third deployment of the safety cars. Jean-Christophe Boullion substantially damaged the front of the No. 13 Rebellion in an accident at the Porsche Curves. He was unhurt. Marshals removed the vehicle and cleaned up the wreckage.

As racing continued in the early morning, the first three entries were all close together. Fässler moved from third to first after a pit stop cycle, but lost the lead when Davidson overtook him on the inside, entering the Indianapolis corner. Davidson flat-spotted the No. 7 Peugeot's front wheels at the first Mulsanne chicane while under pressure from Fässler through the Porsche Curves, allowing Fässler to reclaim the lead. The safety cars were deployed for the fourth time when Christophe Bourret beached the No. 70 Larbre Porsche on the edge of the gravel in the Porsche Curves and reversed back onto the track. Stéphane Ortelli then stopped the No. 59 Ferrari on the track and required assistance from marshals and trackside equipment for recovery. David Hallyday damaged the front-right corner of the No. 48 Oreca LMP2 entry at Arnage corner while attempting to maintain tyre temperature. Hallyday abandoned the car on the run-off area during the safety car period. The Oreca's retirement promoted Mallieux's No. 28 Signatech car to second in LMP2 and Christophe Bouchut's No. 33 Level 5 Motorsports entry to third in class.

=== Morning to afternoon ===
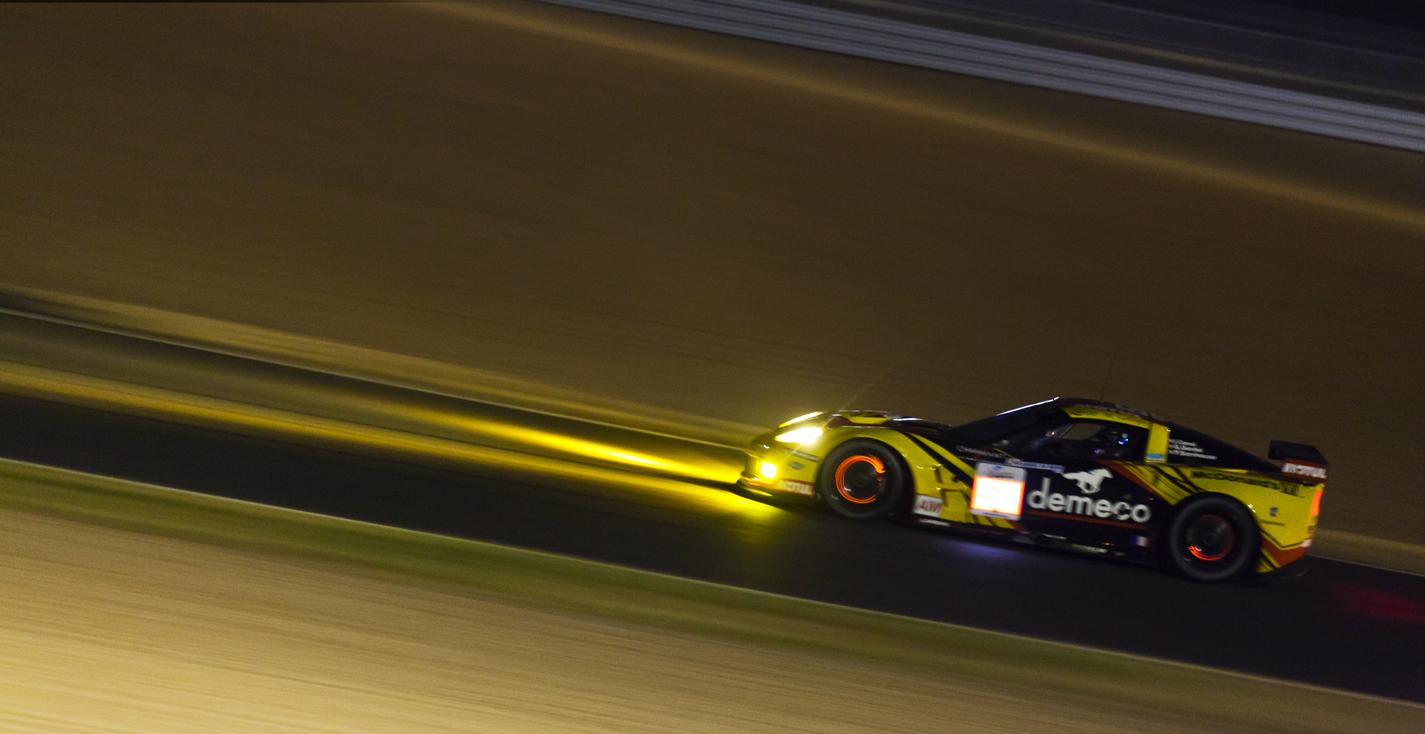
The LMGTE Am-class winning No. 50 Larbre Compétition-fielded Chevrolet Corvette C6.R of Patrick Bornhauser, Julien Canal and Gabriele Gardel

Beretta, who was combating carbon monoxide poisoning from inhaling fumes during previous safety car periods, missed his braking point for Arnage corner and damaged the No. 73 Corvette's front end against the turn's tyre barrier. He reversed the car and rejoined the circuit, retaining third in LMGTE Pro. Seth Neiman's No. 81 Flying Lizard Porsche ran wide into the gravel at Mulsanne, requiring him to temporarily relinquish the LMGTE Am lead to Gabriele Gardel's No. 50 Larbre when Neiman entered the garage with liquids leaking from the car's rear. Pumpelly then relieved Neiman, losing a battle with Gardel for the category lead. Magnussen, driving Corvette's No. 74 LMGTE Pro–leading car, was lapping Horst Felbermayr's No. 63 LMGTE Am Proton Porsche on the inside when he lost control of his car's rear. He collided with the side of Felbermayr's car, sending both vehicles into the barriers. The Corvette and Porsche were both forced to retire due to the accident, moving Vilander's No. 51 Ferrari to the LMGTE Pro lead, with Beretta's No. 73 Corvette second.

The safety cars were deployed for the fifth time. Marshals spent 29 minutes clearing debris in the accident area, and recovery vehicles were used to extricate the damaged vehicles. Following the resumption of racing, the No. 7 and 8 Peugeots were released from the pit lane a lap before the No. 2 Audi of Tréluyer that was at the back of the nearest safety car's queue. Pagenaud took the race lead from Tréluyer before the latter was able to reclaim the position on the outside, entering the second Mulsanne chicane and pulling away with a series of fastest laps. Sarrazin's No. 8 Peugeot received a one-minute stop-and-go penalty because the team member holding the refuelling hose had an incorrectly placed visor when adding fuel to the car., losing a lap to the race leader. In the 19th hour, Wurz missed the apex for Indianapolis corner and went straight on and minor contact with the tyre barrier exiting the turn damaged the No. 7 Peugeot's front-left corner and right-front wheel. The car was extricated by a tractor and driven to the garage, where it lost four laps to the race leaders while its front suspension was repaired.

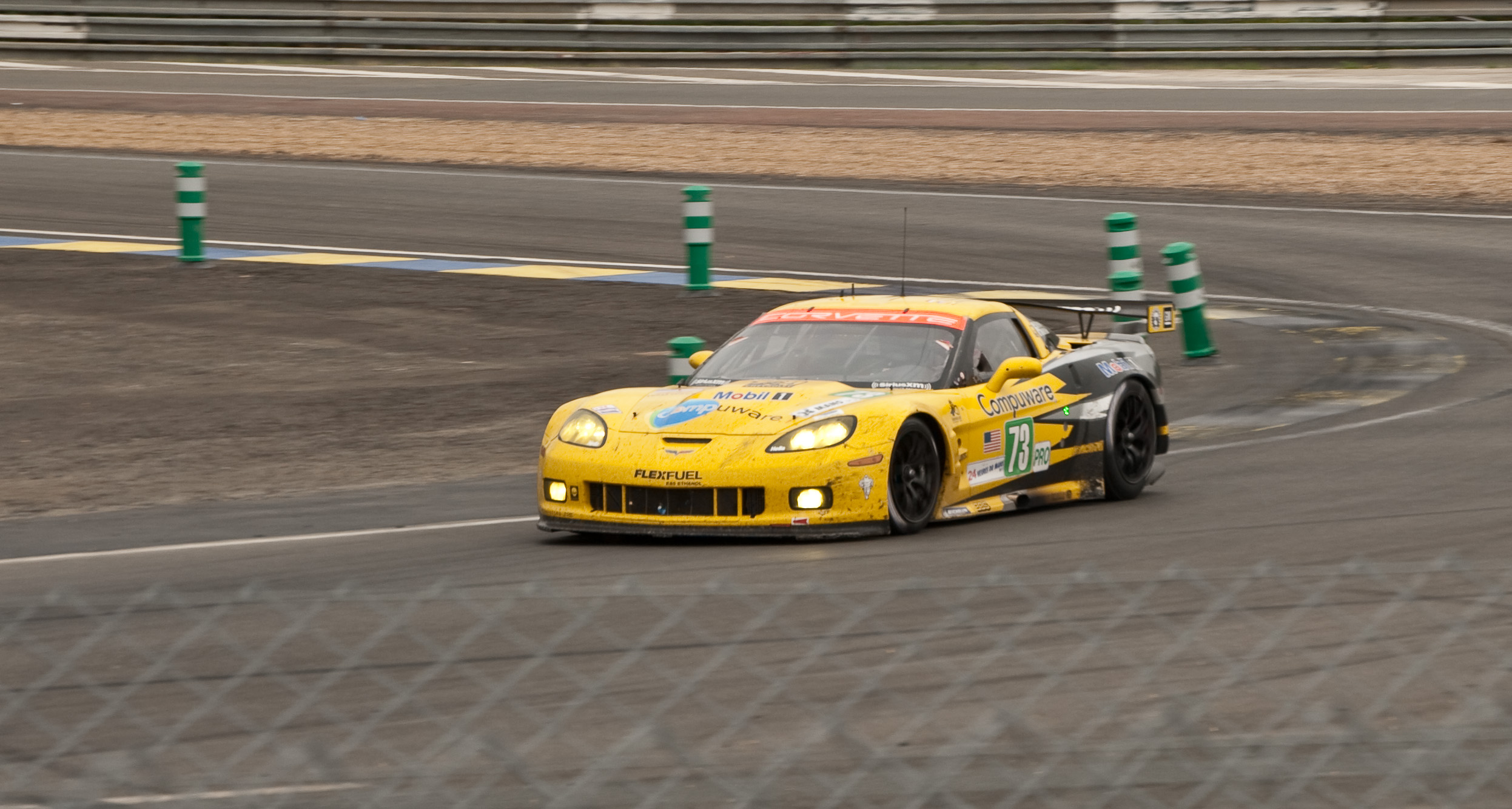
The LMGTE Pro-category winning No. 73 Chevrolet Corvette C6.R driven by Olivier Beretta, Antonio García and Tommy Milner

To end the 19th hour, light rain began to fall on parts of the circuit and quickly increased in intensity, though not enough to disrupt the race. Tréluyer approached the rear of the lapped Davidson and could not lap the No. 7 Peugeot because it blocked his path and removed downforce from Audi's No. 2 car. Audi instructed Tréluyer to slow and not put Davidson another lap down. Lotterer replaced Tréluyer during a routine pit stop before another Peugeot slowed the No. 2 Audi, this time by Montagny's No. 8 entry before being lapped at Mulsanne turn. Due to clutch and electrical issues, Vilander was unable to immediately restart the No. 51 Ferrari at its pit box, giving García's No. 73 Corvette the LMGTE Pro lead. Rain returned to the track during the 22nd hour, causing some cars to be caught out in the changing weather. Kimber-Smith lost control of the Greaves Zytek car at the Dunlop S and was temporarily stuck in the gravel before recovering with assistance and maintaining his LMP2 lead. Collard retired the fifth-place No. 16 Pescarolo 01 after crashing into the tyre barrier entering the Porsche Curves.

In the 23rd hour, Lotterer was delayed by the fourth-place Gené, whom he was attempting to lap; and the two drivers made contact going into the second chicane on the Mulsanne Straight. Lotterer was able to lap Gené after the Mulsanne turn. Robertson Racing's No. 68 Ford GT was promoted to third in LMGTE Am after the JMB Racing Ferrari had to twice enter the garage for clutch repairs. The circuit had become completely dry by the final hour's start. Lotterer was forced to make an extra pit stop to receive four new tyres, and fuel, with fewer than 40 minutes remaining, after Audi noticed the No. 2 car's left-rear tyre was slowly deflating. Race control decided that instead of the traditional slow lap with marshals waving flags, a full lap at slow speed would take place after the race was over. Pascale Gibson, driving the second-place LMGTE Am Larbre Porsche, collided with a tyre wall but recovered without losing his position.

=== Finish ===
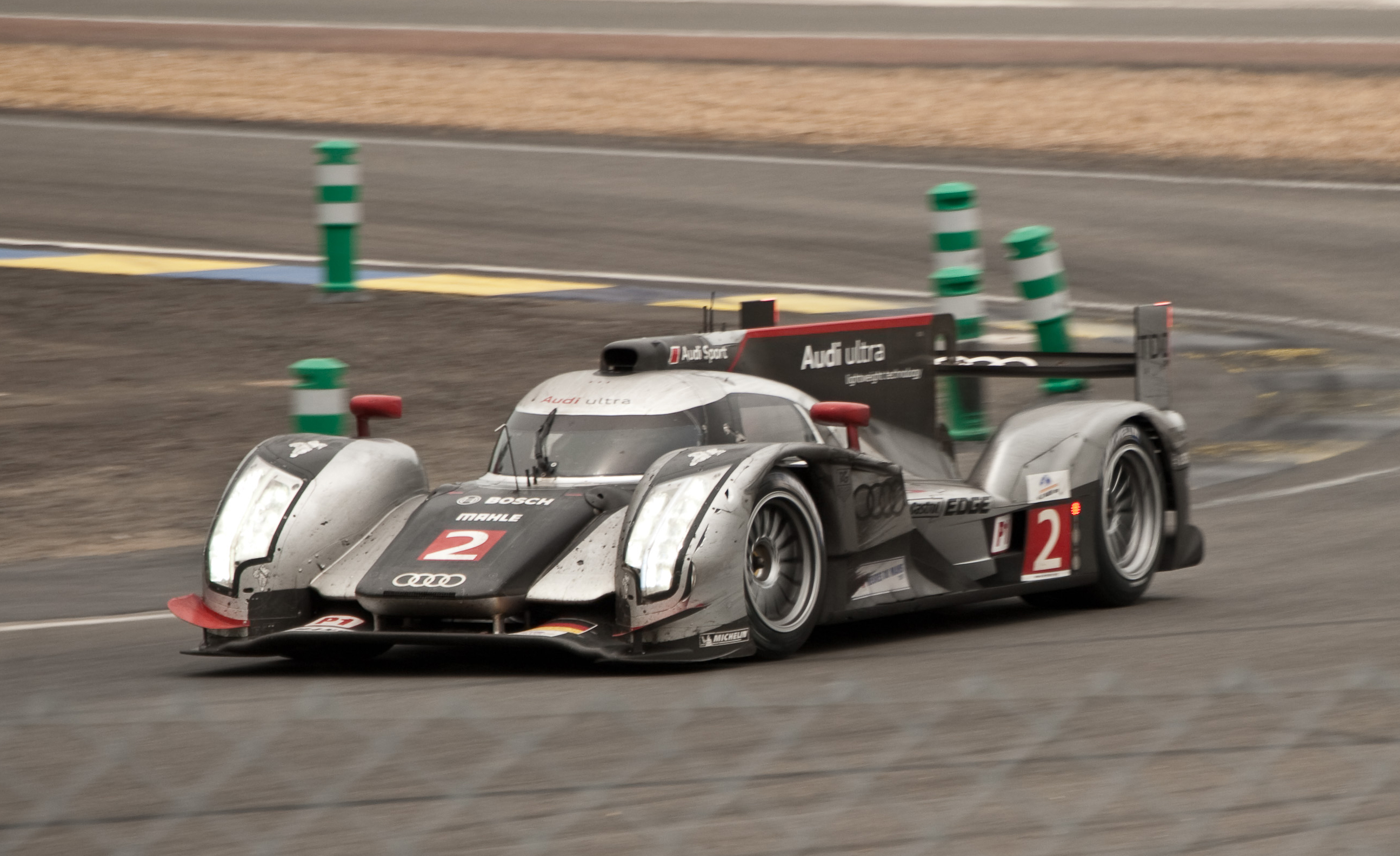
The race-winning No. 2 Audi of Marcel Fässler, André Lotterer and Tréluyer

Lotterer was able to pull away from the No. 9 Peugeot by responding to the car's fast pace in the final half-hour; and the No. 2 Audi was the first to finish after 355 laps. Audi beat Peugeot for the second successive year, and achieved Lotterer's, Fässler's, and Tréluyer's first and Audi's tenth Le Mans win, Their lead engineer, Leena Gade, was the first female race engineer to win the event. In the fourth-closest recorded Le Mans finish, Pagenaud's No. 9 Peugeot came in second 13.854 seconds later. Due to overnight car vibrations, the No. 8 Peugeot, driven by the headache-affected and visually impaired Minassian, finished two laps behind in third place. Greaves led the final 137 laps in LMP2, earning drivers Kimber-Smith, Lombard, and Ojjeh their first class wins and Nissan's first since 2000. Signatech were six laps behind in second, and Level 5 took third in their Le Mans debut. Corvette Racing held their lead in LMGTE Pro, earning the team their seventh category win, Milner's maiden class victory, García's fourth, and Beretta's sixth. The No. 51 Ferrari took AF Corse's first Le Mans class podium in second place, and BMW's No. 56 car was third. Corvette also won in LMGTE Am, with Larbre achieving their sixth category win with the No. 50 entry, ahead of the sister No. 70 Porsche and Robertson's Ford GT. On David and Andrea Robertson's wedding anniversary, the two became the first married couple to finish on the podium. A total of 28 out of the 56 qualifying cars completed the race.

== Post-race ==
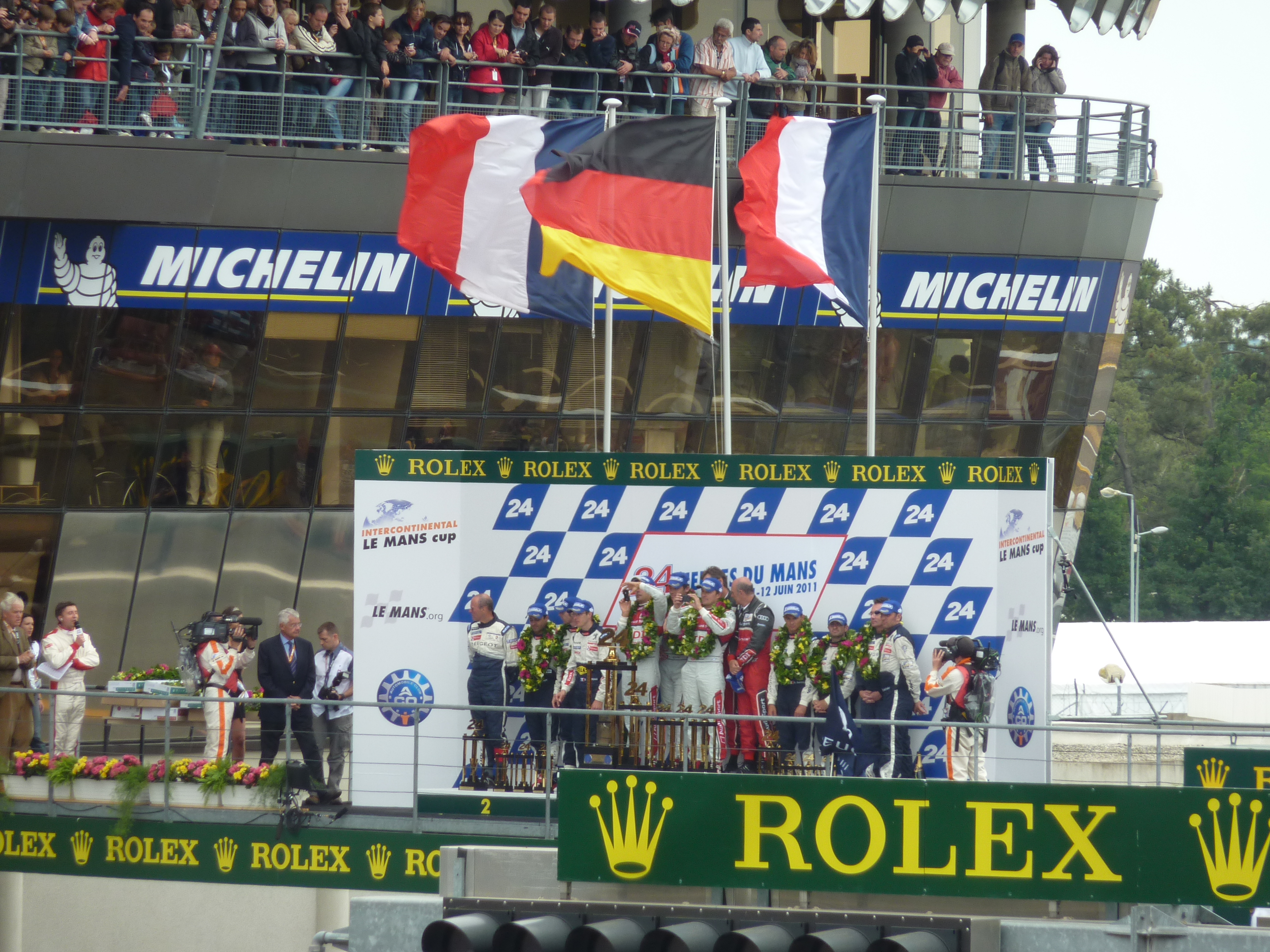
The podium for the top three overall race finishers

The top three teams from each of the four classes had a prize giving ceremony on the podium and spoke to the media at press conferences. Fässler described his emotions as he watched his co-drivers battle Peugeot in the closing stages: "'In the last five hours I was in the pits with everybody, standing by the car when it came in. I didn't know where we were going in the rain. I know how difficult it is to drive a car like this on slicks in the rain.'" Bourdais conceded Peugeot lost to a slightly stronger, quicker, and more reliable Audi squad; and his teammate Pagenaud preferred to have been the driver being caught, adding: "'It was more difficult to finish second by only 13 seconds because it was such a tough battle.'" Davidson denied employing gamesmanship against Lotterer, saying he had not received a team order and acted on his own initiative. He also said he did not deliberately collide with Lotterer and that the closed-cockpit Peugeot allowed him only to observe the latter whilst braking.

McNish was advised not to travel, so that he could recover from body trauma. He praised the strength of the Audi, and said of the first-hour accident that led to the No. 3 car's retirement: "'Obviously, it was a very big accident. I think everybody realises that. I've been banged around a little bit, but the biggest thing is a little bit of pain in the bottom of my back and a big graze around my shin. Considering the impact, the speed and everything else, I think we all got away quite fortunate.'" Beltoise said he did not observe McNish approaching his Ferrari from behind and was "'very surprised'" by the incident. Rockenfeller praised car safety standards following his accident with Kauffman, saying: "'The safety standards at Audi are simply incredible and have saved my life. I've never had such an accident before in my career and hope I'll never have such an experience again.'" Audi team principal Wolfgang Ullrich said that the closed-cockpit vehicle design did not provide as wide a view as from an open-cockpit car but denied that visibility-related issues caused the team's two major race accidents.

Kimber-Smith stated that Greaves's race-long low-risk strategy had proved fruitful, adding: "'There's a perception that you always have to be fast, but in LMP2 you also have to finish and that's exactly what we did.'" His teammate Lombard described the team's victory as "'truly exceptional'" , having tested the car just once, saying: "'It was a delight for me and even though there was fatigue and stress I thought I coped well. Hopefully this success can be the start of things, maybe even a driver for next year as well.'" Milner described his LMGTE Pro victory as "'the hardest drive of my life'" and said the changeable conditions would have made it easier. Beretta stated that he became ill inhaling exhaust gas during a safety car period and that Corvette faced a challenge: "We had a lot of pressure and we just pushed as hard as we could. I think we really deserve the victory.'" Doug Fehan, Corvette Racing's general manager, commented: "'If I were to write a script to celebrate the 100th anniversary of Chevrolet and the 10th anniversary of Corvette Racing's first win at Le Mans, this would undoubtedly be it.'"

Peugeot maintained its lead in the LMP1 Manufacturers' Cup lead with 103 points, ahead of Audi with 69 points. Corvette's class victory moved them to the top of the LMGTE Manufacturers' Cup with 84 points, ahead of Ferrari and BMW, who both had 72 points. Audi Sport Team Joest overtook Peugeot Sport to lead the LMP1 Teams' Cup, while Signatech and AF Corse retained the LMP2 and LMGTE Pro Teams' Cups, respectively. Larbre passed Proton Competition to lead the LMGTE Am Teams' Cup with four rounds remaining in the 2011 ILMC season.

== Official results ==
Class winners are marked in bold. Cars failing to complete 70 per cent of the winner's distance (249 laps) are marked as Not Classified (NC).

Final race results
Pos	Class	No	Team	Drivers	Chassis	Tyre	Laps	Time/Retired
Pos	Class	No	Team	Drivers	Engine	Tyre	Laps	Time/Retired
1	**LMP1**	**2**	**(Germany) Audi Sport Team Joest**	**(Switzerland) Marcel Fässler (Germany) André Lotterer (France) Benoît Tréluyer**	**Audi R18 TDI**	M	**355**	**24:02'21:525**
1	**LMP1**	**2**	**(Germany) Audi Sport Team Joest**	**(Switzerland) Marcel Fässler (Germany) André Lotterer (France) Benoît Tréluyer**	**Audi TDI 3.7 L Turbo V6 (Diesel)**	M	**355**	**24:02'21:525**
2	LMP1	9	(France) Team Peugeot Total	(France) Sébastien Bourdais (France) Simon Pagenaud (Portugal) Pedro Lamy	Peugeot 908	M	355	+13.854
2	LMP1	9	(France) Team Peugeot Total	(France) Sébastien Bourdais (France) Simon Pagenaud (Portugal) Pedro Lamy	Peugeot HDi 3.7 L Turbo V8 (Diesel)	M	355	+13.854
3	LMP1	8	(France) Peugeot Sport Total	(France) Stéphane Sarrazin (France) Franck Montagny (France) Nicolas Minassian	Peugeot 908	M	353	+2 Laps
3	LMP1	8	(France) Peugeot Sport Total	(France) Stéphane Sarrazin (France) Franck Montagny (France) Nicolas Minassian	Peugeot HDi 3.7 L Turbo V8 (Diesel)	M	353	+2 Laps
4	LMP1	7	(France) Peugeot Sport Total	(United Kingdom) Anthony Davidson (Austria) Alexander Wurz (Spain) Marc Gené	Peugeot 908	M	351	+4 Laps
4	LMP1	7	(France) Peugeot Sport Total	(United Kingdom) Anthony Davidson (Austria) Alexander Wurz (Spain) Marc Gené	Peugeot HDi 3.7 L Turbo V8 (Diesel)	M	351	+4 Laps
5	LMP1	10	(France) Team Oreca Matmut	(France) Nicolas Lapierre (France) Loïc Duval (France) Olivier Panis	Peugeot 908 HDi FAP	M	339	+16 Laps
5	LMP1	10	(France) Team Oreca Matmut	(France) Nicolas Lapierre (France) Loïc Duval (France) Olivier Panis	Peugeot HDi 5.5 L Turbo V12 (Diesel)	M	339	+16 Laps
6	LMP1	12	(Switzerland) Rebellion Racing	(France) Nicolas Prost (Switzerland) Neel Jani (Netherlands) Jeroen Bleekemolen	Lola B10/60	M	338	+17 Laps
6	LMP1	12	(Switzerland) Rebellion Racing	(France) Nicolas Prost (Switzerland) Neel Jani (Netherlands) Jeroen Bleekemolen	Toyota RV8KLM 3.4 L V8	M	338	+17 Laps
7	LMP1	22	(Belgium) Kronos Racing (Belgium) Marc VDS Racing Team	(Belgium) Vanina Ickx (Belgium) Bas Leinders (Belgium) Maxime Martin	Lola-Aston Martin B09/60	M	328	+27 Laps
7	LMP1	22	(Belgium) Kronos Racing (Belgium) Marc VDS Racing Team	(Belgium) Vanina Ickx (Belgium) Bas Leinders (Belgium) Maxime Martin	Aston Martin 6.0 L V12	M	328	+27 Laps
8	**LMP2**	**41**	**(United Kingdom) Greaves Motorsport**	**(Saudi Arabia) Karim Ojjeh (France) Olivier Lombard (United Kingdom) Tom Kimber-Smith**	**Zytek Z11SN**	D	**326**	**+29 Laps**
8	**LMP2**	**41**	**(United Kingdom) Greaves Motorsport**	**(Saudi Arabia) Karim Ojjeh (France) Olivier Lombard (United Kingdom) Tom Kimber-Smith**	**Nissan VK45DE 4.5 L V8**	D	**326**	**+29 Laps**
9	LMP2	26	(France) Signatech Nissan	(France) Soheil Ayari (France) Franck Mailleux (Spain) Lucas Ordóñez	Oreca 03	D	320	+35 Laps
9	LMP2	26	(France) Signatech Nissan	(France) Soheil Ayari (France) Franck Mailleux (Spain) Lucas Ordóñez	Nissan VK45DE 4.5 L V8	D	320	+35 Laps
10	LMP2	33	(United States) Level 5 Motorsports	(United States) Scott Tucker (France) Christophe Bouchut (Portugal) João Barbosa	Lola B08/80	M	319	+36 Laps
10	LMP2	33	(United States) Level 5 Motorsports	(United States) Scott Tucker (France) Christophe Bouchut (Portugal) João Barbosa	HPD HR28TT 2.8 L Turbo V6	M	319	+36 Laps
11	**LMGTE; Pro**	**73**	**(United States) Corvette Racing**	**(Monaco) Olivier Beretta (United States) Tommy Milner (Spain) Antonio García**	**Corvette C6.R**	M	**314**	**+41 Laps**
11	**LMGTE; Pro**	**73**	**(United States) Corvette Racing**	**(Monaco) Olivier Beretta (United States) Tommy Milner (Spain) Antonio García**	**Corvette 5.5 L V8**	M	**314**	**+41 Laps**
12	LMP2	36	(United Kingdom) RML	(United Kingdom) Mike Newton (United Kingdom) Ben Collins (Brazil) Thomas Erdos	HPD ARX-01d	D	314	+41 Laps
12	LMP2	36	(United Kingdom) RML	(United Kingdom) Mike Newton (United Kingdom) Ben Collins (Brazil) Thomas Erdos	HPD HR28TT 2.8 L Turbo V6	D	314	+41 Laps
13	LMGTE; Pro	51	(Italy) AF Corse SRL	(Italy) Giancarlo Fisichella (Italy) Gianmaria Bruni (Finland) Toni Vilander	Ferrari 458 Italia GT2	M	314	+41 Laps
13	LMGTE; Pro	51	(Italy) AF Corse SRL	(Italy) Giancarlo Fisichella (Italy) Gianmaria Bruni (Finland) Toni Vilander	Ferrari 4.5 L V8	M	314	+41 Laps
14	LMP2	49	(France) OAK Racing	(Japan) Shinji Nakano (Belgium) Nicolas de Crem (Czech Republic) Jan Charouz	OAK Pescarolo 01	D	313	+42 Laps
14	LMP2	49	(France) OAK Racing	(Japan) Shinji Nakano (Belgium) Nicolas de Crem (Czech Republic) Jan Charouz	Judd-BMW HK 3.6 L V8	D	313	+42 Laps
15	LMGTE; Pro	56	(Germany) BMW Motorsport	(United Kingdom) Andy Priaulx (Germany) Dirk Müller (United States) Joey Hand	BMW M3 GT2	D	313	+42 Laps
15	LMGTE; Pro	56	(Germany) BMW Motorsport	(United Kingdom) Andy Priaulx (Germany) Dirk Müller (United States) Joey Hand	BMW 4.0 L V8	D	313	+42 Laps
16	LMGTE; Pro	77	(Germany) Team Felbermayr-Proton	(Germany) Marc Lieb (Germany) Wolf Henzler (Austria) Richard Lietz	Porsche 997 GT3-RSR	M	312	+43 Laps
16	LMGTE; Pro	77	(Germany) Team Felbermayr-Proton	(Germany) Marc Lieb (Germany) Wolf Henzler (Austria) Richard Lietz	Porsche 4.0 L Flat-6	M	312	+43 Laps
17	LMGTE; Pro	76	(France) IMSA Performance Matmut	(France) Raymond Narac (France) Patrick Pilet (France) Nicolas Armindo	Porsche 997 GT3-RSR	M	311	+44 Laps
17	LMGTE; Pro	76	(France) IMSA Performance Matmut	(France) Raymond Narac (France) Patrick Pilet (France) Nicolas Armindo	Porsche 4.0 L Flat-6	M	311	+44 Laps
18	LMGTE; Pro	80	(United States) Flying Lizard Motorsports	(Germany) Jörg Bergmeister (Germany) Lucas Luhr (United States) Patrick Long	Porsche 997 GT3-RSR	M	310	+45 Laps
18	LMGTE; Pro	80	(United States) Flying Lizard Motorsports	(Germany) Jörg Bergmeister (Germany) Lucas Luhr (United States) Patrick Long	Porsche 4.0 L Flat-6	M	310	+45 Laps
19	LMP2	40	(Switzerland) Race Performance	(Switzerland) Michel Frey (Switzerland) Ralph Meichtry (France) Marc Rostan	Oreca 03	D	304	+51 Laps
19	LMP2	40	(Switzerland) Race Performance	(Switzerland) Michel Frey (Switzerland) Ralph Meichtry (France) Marc Rostan	Judd-BMW HK 3.6 L V8	D	304	+51 Laps
20	**LMGTE; Am**	**50**	**(France) Larbre Compétition**	**(France) Patrick Bornhauser (France) Julien Canal (Switzerland) Gabriele Gardel**	**Corvette C6.R**	M	**302**	**+53 Laps**
20	**LMGTE; Am**	**50**	**(France) Larbre Compétition**	**(France) Patrick Bornhauser (France) Julien Canal (Switzerland) Gabriele Gardel**	**Corvette 5.5 L V8**	M	**302**	**+53 Laps**
21	LMGTE; Am	70	(France) Larbre Compétition	(France) Christophe Bourret (France) Pascal Gibon (France) Jean-Philippe Belloc	Porsche 997 GT3-RSR	M	301	+54 Laps
21	LMGTE; Am	70	(France) Larbre Compétition	(France) Christophe Bourret (France) Pascal Gibon (France) Jean-Philippe Belloc	Porsche 4.0 L Flat-6	M	301	+54 Laps
22	LMGTE; Pro	65	(Austria) Lotus Jetalliance	(Switzerland) Jonathan Hirschi (United Kingdom) Johnny Mowlem (United Kingdom) James Rossiter	Lotus Evora GTE	M	295	+60 Laps
22	LMGTE; Pro	65	(Austria) Lotus Jetalliance	(Switzerland) Jonathan Hirschi (United Kingdom) Johnny Mowlem (United Kingdom) James Rossiter	Toyota-Cosworth 4.0 L V6	M	295	+60 Laps
23	LMGTE; Pro	75	(Belgium) Prospeed Competition	(Belgium) Marc Goossens (Germany) Marco Holzer (Netherlands) Jaap van Lagen	Porsche 997 GT3-RSR	M	293	+63 Laps
23	LMGTE; Pro	75	(Belgium) Prospeed Competition	(Belgium) Marc Goossens (Germany) Marco Holzer (Netherlands) Jaap van Lagen	Porsche 4.0 L Flat-6	M	293	+63 Laps
24	LMGTE; Pro	66	(United Kingdom) JMW Motorsport	(United Kingdom) Rob Bell (United Kingdom) Tim Sugden (Netherlands) Xavier Maassen	Ferrari 458 Italia GT2	D	290	+65 Laps
24	LMGTE; Pro	66	(United Kingdom) JMW Motorsport	(United Kingdom) Rob Bell (United Kingdom) Tim Sugden (Netherlands) Xavier Maassen	Ferrari 4.5 L V8	D	290	+65 Laps
25	LMP2	35	(France) OAK Racing	(France) Frédéric Da Rocha (France) Patrice Lafargue (Italy) Andrea Barlesi	OAK Pescarolo 01	D	288	+67 Laps
25	LMP2	35	(France) OAK Racing	(France) Frédéric Da Rocha (France) Patrice Lafargue (Italy) Andrea Barlesi	Judd-BMW HK 3.6 L V8	D	288	+67 Laps
26	LMGTE; Am	68	(United States) Robertson Racing LLC	(United States) David Robertson (United States) Andrea Robertson (United States) David Murry	Ford GT-R Mk. VII	M	285	+70 Laps
26	LMGTE; Am	68	(United States) Robertson Racing LLC	(United States) David Robertson (United States) Andrea Robertson (United States) David Murry	Ford Cammer 5.0 L V8	M	285	+70 Laps
27	LMGTE; Am	83	(Monaco) JMB Racing	(France) Manuel Rodrigues (France) Jean-Marc Menahem (France) Nicolas Marroc	Ferrari F430 GTE	D	272	+83 Laps
27	LMGTE; Am	83	(Monaco) JMB Racing	(France) Manuel Rodrigues (France) Jean-Marc Menahem (France) Nicolas Marroc	Ferrari 4.0 L V8	D	272	+83 Laps
NC	LMP2	44	(France) Extrême Limite AM Paris	(France) Fabien Rosier (France) Philippe Haezebrouck (France) Jean-René De Fournoux	Norma MP200P	D	247	Insufficient distance
NC	LMP2	44	(France) Extrême Limite AM Paris	(France) Fabien Rosier (France) Philippe Haezebrouck (France) Jean-René De Fournoux	Judd-BMW HK 3.6 L V8	D	247	Insufficient distance
DNF	LMP1	16	(France) Pescarolo Team	(France) Emmanuel Collard (France) Christophe Tinseau (France) Julien Jousse	Pescarolo 01	M	305	Accident
DNF	LMP1	16	(France) Pescarolo Team	(France) Emmanuel Collard (France) Christophe Tinseau (France) Julien Jousse	Judd GV5 S2 5.0 L V10	M	305	Accident
DNF	LMGTE; Pro	55	(Germany) BMW Motorsport	(Brazil) Augusto Farfus (Germany) Jörg Müller (Germany) Dirk Werner	BMW M3 GT2	D	276	Driveshaft
DNF	LMGTE; Pro	55	(Germany) BMW Motorsport	(Brazil) Augusto Farfus (Germany) Jörg Müller (Germany) Dirk Werner	BMW 4.0 L V8	D	276	Driveshaft
DNF	LMGTE; Pro	74	(United States) Corvette Racing	(United Kingdom) Oliver Gavin (United Kingdom) Richard Westbrook (Denmark) Jan Magnussen	Corvette C6.R	M	211	Accident
DNF	LMGTE; Pro	74	(United States) Corvette Racing	(United Kingdom) Oliver Gavin (United Kingdom) Richard Westbrook (Denmark) Jan Magnussen	Corvette 5.5 L V8	M	211	Accident
DNF	LMGTE; Am	81	(United States) Flying Lizard Motorsports	(United States) Seth Neiman (United States) Darren Law (United States) Spencer Pumpelly	Porsche 997 GT3-RSR	M	211	Accident
DNF	LMGTE; Am	81	(United States) Flying Lizard Motorsports	(United States) Seth Neiman (United States) Darren Law (United States) Spencer Pumpelly	Porsche 4.0 L Flat-6	M	211	Accident
DNF	LMP2	48	(France) Team Oreca Matmut	(France) Alexandre Prémat (France) David Hallyday (Austria) Dominik Kraihamer	Oreca 03	M	200	Accident
DNF	LMP2	48	(France) Team Oreca Matmut	(France) Alexandre Prémat (France) David Hallyday (Austria) Dominik Kraihamer	Nissan VK45DE 4.5 L V8	M	200	Accident
DNF	LMGTE; Am	63	(Germany) Proton Competition	(Austria) Horst Felbermayr Jr. (Austria) Horst Felbermayr (Germany) Christian Ried	Porsche 997 GT3-RSR	M	199	Accident
DNF	LMGTE; Am	63	(Germany) Proton Competition	(Austria) Horst Felbermayr Jr. (Austria) Horst Felbermayr (Germany) Christian Ried	Porsche 4.0 L Flat-6	M	199	Accident
DNF	LMP1	13	(Switzerland) Rebellion Racing	(Italy) Andrea Belicchi (France) Jean-Christophe Boullion (United Kingdom) Guy Smith	Lola B10/60	M	190	Accident
DNF	LMP1	13	(Switzerland) Rebellion Racing	(Italy) Andrea Belicchi (France) Jean-Christophe Boullion (United Kingdom) Guy Smith	Toyota RV8KLM 3.4 L V8	M	190	Accident
DNF	LMGTE; Am	61	(Italy) AF Corse SRL	(Italy) Piergiuseppe Perazzini (Italy) Marco Cioci (Republic of Ireland) Seán Paul Breslin	Ferrari F430 GTE	M	188	Accident
DNF	LMGTE; Am	61	(Italy) AF Corse SRL	(Italy) Piergiuseppe Perazzini (Italy) Marco Cioci (Republic of Ireland) Seán Paul Breslin	Ferrari 4.0 L V8	M	188	Accident
DNF	LMGTE; Pro	59	(France) Luxury Racing	(Monaco) Stéphane Ortelli (France) Frédéric Makowiecki (Brazil) Jaime Melo	Ferrari 458 Italia GT2	M	183	Engine
DNF	LMGTE; Pro	59	(France) Luxury Racing	(Monaco) Stéphane Ortelli (France) Frédéric Makowiecki (Brazil) Jaime Melo	Ferrari 4.5 L V8	M	183	Engine
DNF	LMGTE; Pro	71	(Italy) AF Corse	(United States) Robert Kauffman (United States) Michael Waltrip (Portugal) Rui Águas	Ferrari 458 Italia GT2	M	178	Transmission
DNF	LMGTE; Pro	71	(Italy) AF Corse	(United States) Robert Kauffman (United States) Michael Waltrip (Portugal) Rui Águas	Ferrari 4.5 L V8	M	178	Transmission
DNF	LMGTE; Pro	88	(Germany) Team Felbermayr-Proton	(United Kingdom) Nick Tandy (Saudi Arabia) Abdulaziz Al-Faisal (United States) Bryce Miller	Porsche 997 GT3-RSR	M	169	Accident
DNF	LMGTE; Pro	88	(Germany) Team Felbermayr-Proton	(United Kingdom) Nick Tandy (Saudi Arabia) Abdulaziz Al-Faisal (United States) Bryce Miller	Porsche 4.0 L Flat-6	M	169	Accident
DNF	LMP2	42	(United Kingdom) Strakka Racing	(United Kingdom) Nick Leventis (United Kingdom) Danny Watts (United Kingdom) Jonny Kane	HPD ARX-01d	M	144	Engine
DNF	LMP2	42	(United Kingdom) Strakka Racing	(United Kingdom) Nick Leventis (United Kingdom) Danny Watts (United Kingdom) Jonny Kane	HPD HR28TT 2.8 L Turbo V6	M	144	Engine
DNF	LMGTE; Am	60	(United Arab Emirates) Gulf AMR Middle East	(France) Fabien Giroix (Germany) Roald Goethe (United Kingdom) Michael Wainwright	Aston Martin Vantage GT2	D	141	Accident
DNF	LMGTE; Am	60	(United Arab Emirates) Gulf AMR Middle East	(France) Fabien Giroix (Germany) Roald Goethe (United Kingdom) Michael Wainwright	Aston Martin 4.5 L V8	D	141	Accident
DNF	LMP2	39	(Argentina) PeCom Racing	(Argentina) Luis Pérez Companc (Argentina) Matías Russo (Germany) Pierre Kaffer	Lola B11/40	M	139	Accident
DNF	LMP2	39	(Argentina) PeCom Racing	(Argentina) Luis Pérez Companc (Argentina) Matías Russo (Germany) Pierre Kaffer	Judd-BMW HK 3.6 L V8	M	139	Accident
DNF	LMGTE; Pro	89	(Germany) Hankook-Team Farnbacher	(Germany) Dominik Farnbacher (Denmark) Allan Simonsen (United States) Leh Keen	Ferrari 458 Italia GT2	H	137	Engine
DNF	LMGTE; Pro	89	(Germany) Hankook-Team Farnbacher	(Germany) Dominik Farnbacher (Denmark) Allan Simonsen (United States) Leh Keen	Ferrari 4.5 L V8	H	137	Engine
DNF	LMGTE; Pro	58	(France) Luxury Racing	(France) Anthony Beltoise (France) François Jakubowski (France) Pierre Thiriet	Ferrari 458 Italia GT2	M	136	Accident
DNF	LMGTE; Pro	58	(France) Luxury Racing	(France) Anthony Beltoise (France) François Jakubowski (France) Pierre Thiriet	Ferrari 4.5 L V8	M	136	Accident
DNF	LMGTE; Pro	64	(Austria) Lotus Jetalliance	(Netherlands) Oskar Slingerland (United Kingdom) Martin Rich (United Kingdom) John Hartshorne	Lotus Evora GTE	M	126	Accident
DNF	LMGTE; Pro	64	(Austria) Lotus Jetalliance	(Netherlands) Oskar Slingerland (United Kingdom) Martin Rich (United Kingdom) John Hartshorne	Toyota-Cosworth 4.0 L V6	M	126	Accident
DNF	LMGTE; Am	57	(United States) Krohn Racing	(United States) Tracy Krohn (Sweden) Niclas Jönsson (Italy) Michele Rugolo	Ferrari F430 GTE	D	123	Mechanical
DNF	LMGTE; Am	57	(United States) Krohn Racing	(United States) Tracy Krohn (Sweden) Niclas Jönsson (Italy) Michele Rugolo	Ferrari 4.0 L V8	D	123	Mechanical
DNF	LMP1	24	(France) OAK Racing	(Monaco) Richard Hein (France) Jacques Nicolet (France) Jean-François Yvon	OAK Pescarolo 01	D	119	Engine fire
DNF	LMP1	24	(France) OAK Racing	(Monaco) Richard Hein (France) Jacques Nicolet (France) Jean-François Yvon	Judd DB 3.4 L V8	D	119	Engine fire
DNF	LMP1	1	(Germany) Audi Sport Team Joest	(Germany) Timo Bernhard (France) Romain Dumas (Germany) Mike Rockenfeller	Audi R18 TDI	M	116	Accident
DNF	LMP1	1	(Germany) Audi Sport Team Joest	(Germany) Timo Bernhard (France) Romain Dumas (Germany) Mike Rockenfeller	Audi TDI 3.7 L Turbo V6 (Diesel)	M	116	Accident
DNF	LMP1	5	(Switzerland) Hope Racing	(Switzerland) Steve Zacchia (Netherlands) Jan Lammers (Denmark) Casper Elgaard	Oreca 01	M	115	Fire
DNF	LMP1	5	(Switzerland) Hope Racing	(Switzerland) Steve Zacchia (Netherlands) Jan Lammers (Denmark) Casper Elgaard	Swiss HyTech 2.0 L Hybrid Turbo I4	M	115	Fire
DNF	LMGTE; Am	62	(United Kingdom) CRS Racing	(Germany) Pierre Ehret (United Kingdom) Shaun Lynn (New Zealand) Roger Wills	Ferrari F430 GTE	M	84	Accident
DNF	LMGTE; Am	62	(United Kingdom) CRS Racing	(Germany) Pierre Ehret (United Kingdom) Shaun Lynn (New Zealand) Roger Wills	Ferrari 4.0 L V8	M	84	Accident
DNF	LMP1	15	(France) OAK Racing	(France) Guillaume Moreau (France) Pierre Ragues (Portugal) Tiago Monteiro	OAK Pescarolo 01	D	80	Power steering
DNF	LMP1	15	(France) OAK Racing	(France) Guillaume Moreau (France) Pierre Ragues (Portugal) Tiago Monteiro	Judd DB 3.4 L V8	D	80	Power steering
DNF	LMGTE; Pro	79	(United Kingdom) Jota	(United Kingdom) Sam Hancock (United Kingdom) Simon Dolan (United Kingdom) Chris Buncombe	Aston Martin Vantage GT2	D	74	Engine
DNF	LMGTE; Pro	79	(United Kingdom) Jota	(United Kingdom) Sam Hancock (United Kingdom) Simon Dolan (United Kingdom) Chris Buncombe	Aston Martin 4.5 L V8	D	74	Engine
DNF	LMP1	20	(Portugal) Quifel-ASM Team	(Portugal) Miguel Amaral (France) Olivier Pla (United Kingdom) Warren Hughes	Zytek 09SC	D	48	Engine
DNF	LMP1	20	(Portugal) Quifel-ASM Team	(Portugal) Miguel Amaral (France) Olivier Pla (United Kingdom) Warren Hughes	Zytek ZG348 3.4 L V8	D	48	Engine
DNF	LMP1	3	(Germany) Audi Sport North America	(Denmark) Tom Kristensen (Italy) Rinaldo Capello (United Kingdom) Allan McNish	Audi R18 TDI	M	14	Accident
DNF	LMP1	3	(Germany) Audi Sport North America	(Denmark) Tom Kristensen (Italy) Rinaldo Capello (United Kingdom) Allan McNish	Audi TDI 3.7 L Turbo V6 (Diesel)	M	14	Accident
DNF	LMP1	007	(United Kingdom) Aston Martin Racing	(Germany) Stefan Mücke (United Kingdom) Darren Turner (Austria) Christian Klien	Aston Martin AMR-One	M	4	Engine
DNF	LMP1	007	(United Kingdom) Aston Martin Racing	(Germany) Stefan Mücke (United Kingdom) Darren Turner (Austria) Christian Klien	Aston Martin 2.0 L Turbo I6	M	4	Engine
DNF	LMP1	009	(United Kingdom) Aston Martin Racing	(Switzerland) Harold Primat (Mexico) Adrián Fernández (United Kingdom) Andy Meyrick	Aston Martin AMR-One	M	2	Engine
DNF	LMP1	009	(United Kingdom) Aston Martin Racing	(Switzerland) Harold Primat (Mexico) Adrián Fernández (United Kingdom) Andy Meyrick	Aston Martin 2.0 L Turbo I6	M	2	Engine

Tyre manufacturers
Key
Symbol	Tyre manufacturer
**D**	Dunlop
**H**	Hankook
**M**	Michelin

== Championship standings after the race ==
LMP1 Manufacturers' Cup
Pos.	+/–	Manufacturer	Points
1		(France) Peugeot	103
2		(Germany) Audi	69
3		(United Kingdom) Aston Martin	0

LMGTE Manufacturers' Cup
Pos.	+/–	Manufacturer	Points
1	1	(United States) Corvette	84
2		(Italy) Ferrari	72
3	1	(Germany) BMW	72

LMP1 Teams' Cup
Pos.	+/–	Team	Points
1	1	(Germany) Audi Sport Team Joest	50
2	1	(France) Peugeot Sport Total	49
3		(France) Team Oreca Matmut	34

LMP2 Teams' Cup
Pos.	+/–	Team	Points
1		(France) Signatech Nissan	49
2	1	(United States) Level 5 Motorsports	31
3	1	(France) OAK Racing	30

LMGTE Pro Teams' Cup
Pos.	+/–	Team	Points
1		(Italy) AF Corse	53
2		(Germany) BMW Motorsport	49
3	1	(United Kingdom) Lotus Jetalliance	16

LMGTE Am Teams' Cup
Pos.	+/–	Team	Points
1	2	(France) Larbre Compétition	41
2	1	(United States) Proton Competition	24
3	1	(United States) Krohn Racing	21

== Bibliography ==
- "24 Hours of Le Mans Supplementary Regulations" (PDF). Automobile Club de l'Ouest. 3 December 2010. Archived (PDF) from the original on 15 March 2012.

Intercontinental Le Mans Cup
Previous race: 1000 km of Spa	2011 season	Next race: 6 Hours of Imola
