= 908 Taiwan Republic Campaign =

The "Táiwānguó" flag

The 908 Taiwan Republic Campaign is an umbrella organization of a small activist groups for the goal of Taiwan independence. It is led by Peter Wang (王獻極).

The group takes its name from the date, September 8, that they mark as the utopian Taiwanese Independence Day. It is the date that Japan signed the Treaty of San Francisco in 1951. The treaty officially ended World War II and also Japan's territorial claims over Taiwan.

The group has written a so-called Declaration of Independence for Taiwan, usually publicized at the group's events.

The groups stated goals before December 2008 were:

- To work with politicians to create a constitution ready for public comment by 28 February 2007. (Not accomplished)
- To have an endorsement by at least three million Taiwanese one year later.
- To request the next president to ratify the constitution by 8 September 2008. (Not accomplished)
- To send 8000 children to the United Nations building in New York City to display the new constitution and appeal for inclusion in the world governing body. (Not accomplished)

Prototype drafts of the new constitution feature a three-branch government with clear delineation of power, and for checks and balances. The 908s believe the current political climate lacks jurisdictional clarity. It will also feature constitutional provisions for equality and against political corruption and vote buying. The 908s are critical of the current constitution of the Republic of China, calling it a "meaningless document that only cares about the 1.3 billion people who live in China and has nothing to do with the welfare of the 23 million people of Taiwan."

Many politicians from the Taiwan Solidarity Union and some from the Democratic Progressive Party openly participate in 908 rallies.
