= List of highways numbered 905 =

Route 905, or Highway 905, may refer to:

== Canada ==
- New Brunswick Route 905
- Saskatchewan Highway 905

== Costa Rica ==
- National Route 905

== United States ==
- SR 905 (future Interstate 905)
- NC 905
- PR-905
- SC 905

Preceded by 904	Lists of highways 905	Succeeded by 906
