= List of highways numbered 908 =

The following highways are numbered 908:

== United States ==
Maryland

- Maryland Route 908

South Carolina

- South Carolina Highway 908

Territories

- Puerto Rico Highway 908

Washington

- Washington State Route 908

| Preceded by 907 | Lists of highways 908 | Succeeded by 909 |
