= Peugeot 908 =

French racing car

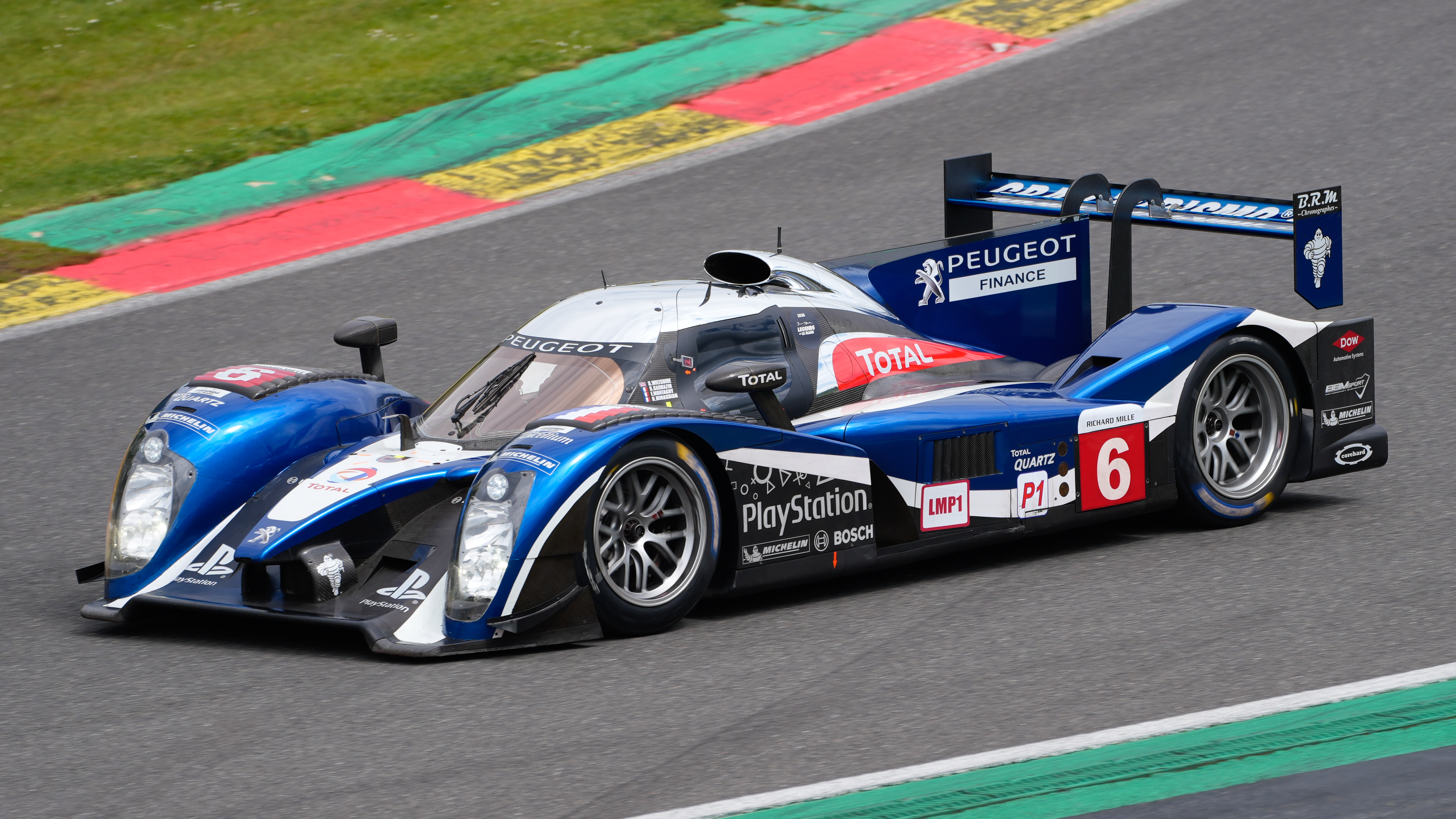
- The No. 6 908 of BBM Sport during the Legends of Le Mans race supporting the 2026 6 Hours of Spa-Francorchamps
- Category: Le Mans Prototype LMP1
- Constructor: Peugeot
- Designer: Paolo Catone
- Predecessor: Peugeot 908 HDi FAP
- Successor: Peugeot 9X8 (Le Mans Hypercar)

Technical specifications
- Chassis: Carbon fibre monocoque
- Suspension (front): Double wishbone suspension, torsion bar with damper, anti-roll bar
- Suspension (rear): Double wishbone suspension, torsion bar with damper, anti-roll bar
- Axle track: 2,000 mm (79 in)
- Wheelbase: 2,950 mm (116 in)
- Engine: Peugeot HDi 3.7 L (230 cu in) 90° V8 twin-turbo, mid-engined, longitudinally mounted
- Transmission: Ricardo 6-speed sequential manual Limited-slip
- Weight: Appr. 900 kg (2,000 lb)
- Fuel: Total Diesel
- Tyres: Michelin

Competition history
- Notable entrants: (France) Peugeot Sport Total
- Notable drivers: (Austria) Alexander Wurz (United Kingdom) Anthony Davidson (Spain) Marc Gené (Portugal) Pedro Lamy (France) Franck Montagny (France) Stéphane Sarrazin
- Debut: 2011 12 Hours of Sebring
- First win: 2011 12 Hours of Sebring
- Last win: 2011 6 Hours of Zhuhai
- Last event: 2011 6 Hours of Zhuhai
Races	Wins	Poles	F/Laps
7	6	5	6
- Teams' Championships: 1 (2011 ILMC)
- Constructors' Championships: 1 (2011 ILMC)

The Peugeot 908 is an auto racing car developed by Peugeot Sport in 2011 for the Le Mans Prototype category of racing. Powered by a diesel engine, it is the successor to the Peugeot 908 HDi FAP which competed since 2007. The newer 908 features a smaller diesel than its predecessor, utilizing a 3,700 cc (230 cu in) HDi V8 engine with Honeywell Turbo Technologies turbocharger in order to meet new regulations for 2011. The 908 has competed in all rounds of the 2011 Intercontinental Le Mans Cup including the 2011 24 Hours of Le Mans. The new 908 lost about 150 bhp compared to 2010 but improvements in the chassis and handling made the car much more agile. Unlike its predecessor the front tyres are the same width as the rear. The only part that has been reused from its predecessor was the windscreen wiper.

== Racing History ==
=== 2011 ===
The 908 was known under the codename 90X during development. The car was officially revealed in February 2011.

The 908's first competitive outing was at the 2011 Sebring 12 Hours. The new cars faced competition from the older R15+ and the older-specification Oreca Peugeot 908 HDi FAP. Both Peugeots ran at the front, building a 2-second gap per lap over the Audi but relentless safety car periods cut their lead over time. Marc Gené then shoved the car to the inside of Capello in turn 17. Both cars spun but only Gené hit the barrier and suffered a suspension failure. The #8 led for a while until a slow pit stop and a spin by Lamy threw them back to third. The Peugeots finished 3rd and 8th.

At the 2011 1000 km of Spa, three 908s were up against Audi's new R18 as well as the R15+ and Oreca / Matmut 908. After a disastrous qualifying session leaving only one 908 in the top ten, they quickly got to the front of the field during the first laps and soon were running 1-2-3 after the R18s ran into technical issues. After an off by the third placed 908 piloted by Pedro Lamy, Tom Kristensen's R18 took its position. Following damage to the engine cover of the R18, the Peugeots regained the podium positions, but a front suspension failure half an hour before the end of the race led to a nine-minute pit-stop and a drop into position eight. Nonetheless this same car achieved the fastest lap of the event at 2:03.699.

At Le Mans the three Peugeot 908s were able to battle Audi for the lead of the race. Aided by fewer pit stops, Peugeot remained on the same lap as the lead Audi but failed to catch the leader in the final hour, the No. 9 Peugeot crossing the finish line thirteen seconds behind the race winner.

=== 2012 ===
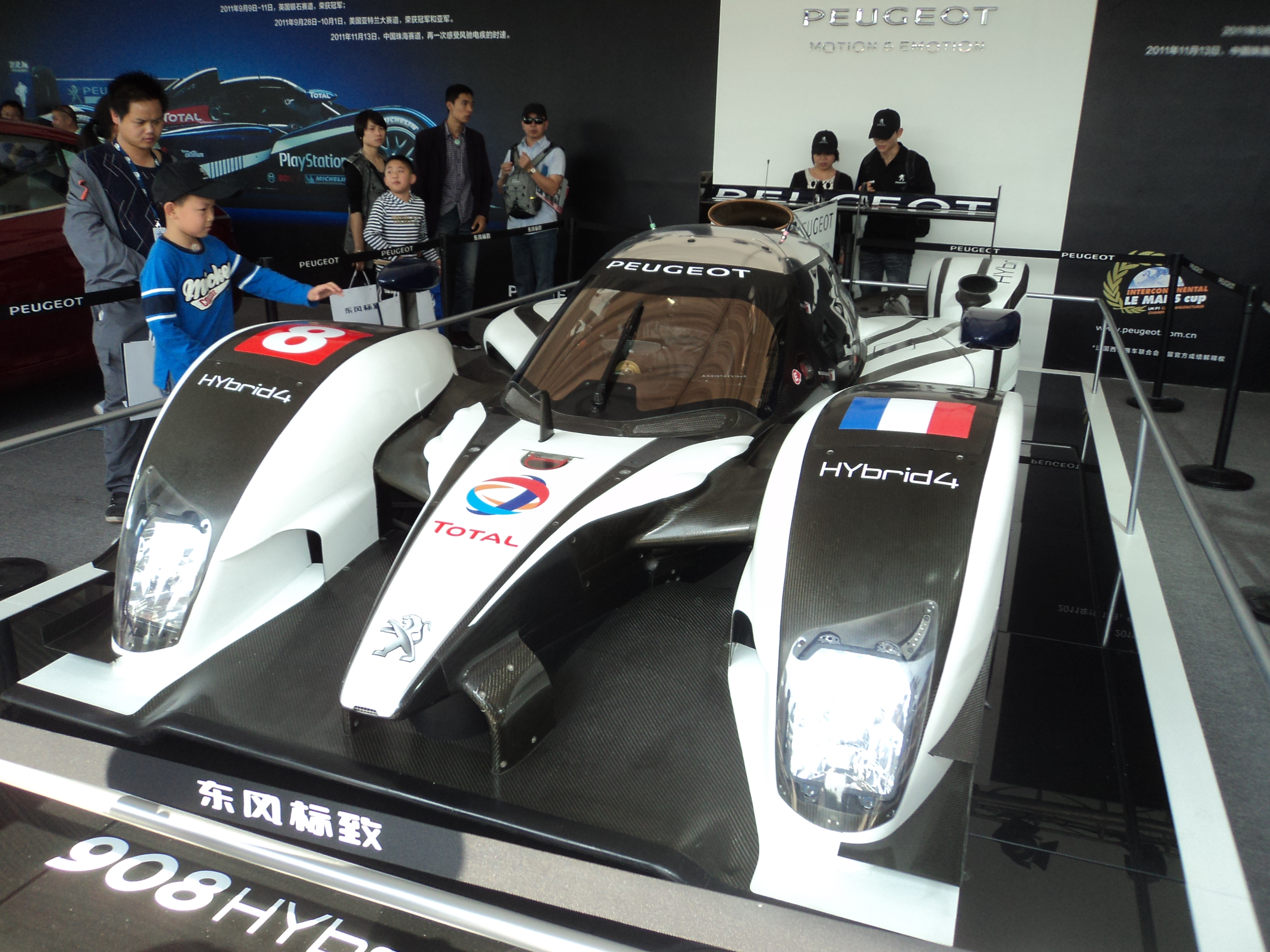
Peugeot 908 Hybrid4 on display at Zhuhai International Circuit.

A hybrid version of the 908 known as the Peugeot 908 Hybrid4 was expected to run in the FIA World Endurance Championship in 2012 in addition to an updated version of the regular car, but after poor economic performance in 2011 Peugeot cancelled their race program for 2012. Peugeot was already at Sebring to test the new cars, so the announcement came as a severe blow to Peugeot Sport Total.

== Complete racing results ==
=== Intercontinental Le Mans Cup ===
(key) Races in bold indicates pole position. Races in italics indicates fastest lap.

Year	Entrant	Class	No	Results							Championship	
Year	Entrant	Class	No	1	2	3	4	5	6	7	Pts.	Pos.
2011	(France) Team Peugeot Total	LMP1		SEB	SPA	LMS	IMO	SIL	ATL	ZHU	113	1st
2011	(France) Team Peugeot Total	LMP1	7	1	1	2	**1**	**1**	**1**	**1**	113	1st
2011	(France) Team Peugeot Total	LMP1	8	**3**	2	3	2	8	2	2	113	1st

=== 24 Hours of Le Mans ===
Year	Entrant	#	Drivers	Class	Laps	Pos.	Class Pos.
2011	(France) Peugeot Sport Total	7	(United Kingdom) Anthony Davidson (Austria) Alexander Wurz (Spain) Marc Gené	LMP1	351	4th	4th
2011	(France) Peugeot Sport Total	8	(France) Stéphane Sarrazin (France) Franck Montagny (France) Nicolas Minassian	LMP1	353	**3rd**	**3rd**
2011	(France) Team Peugeot Total	9	(France) Sébastien Bourdais (France) Simon Pagenaud (Portugal) Pedro Lamy	LMP1	355	**2nd**	**2nd**
