= Olivier Beretta =

Monégasque racing driver (born 1969)

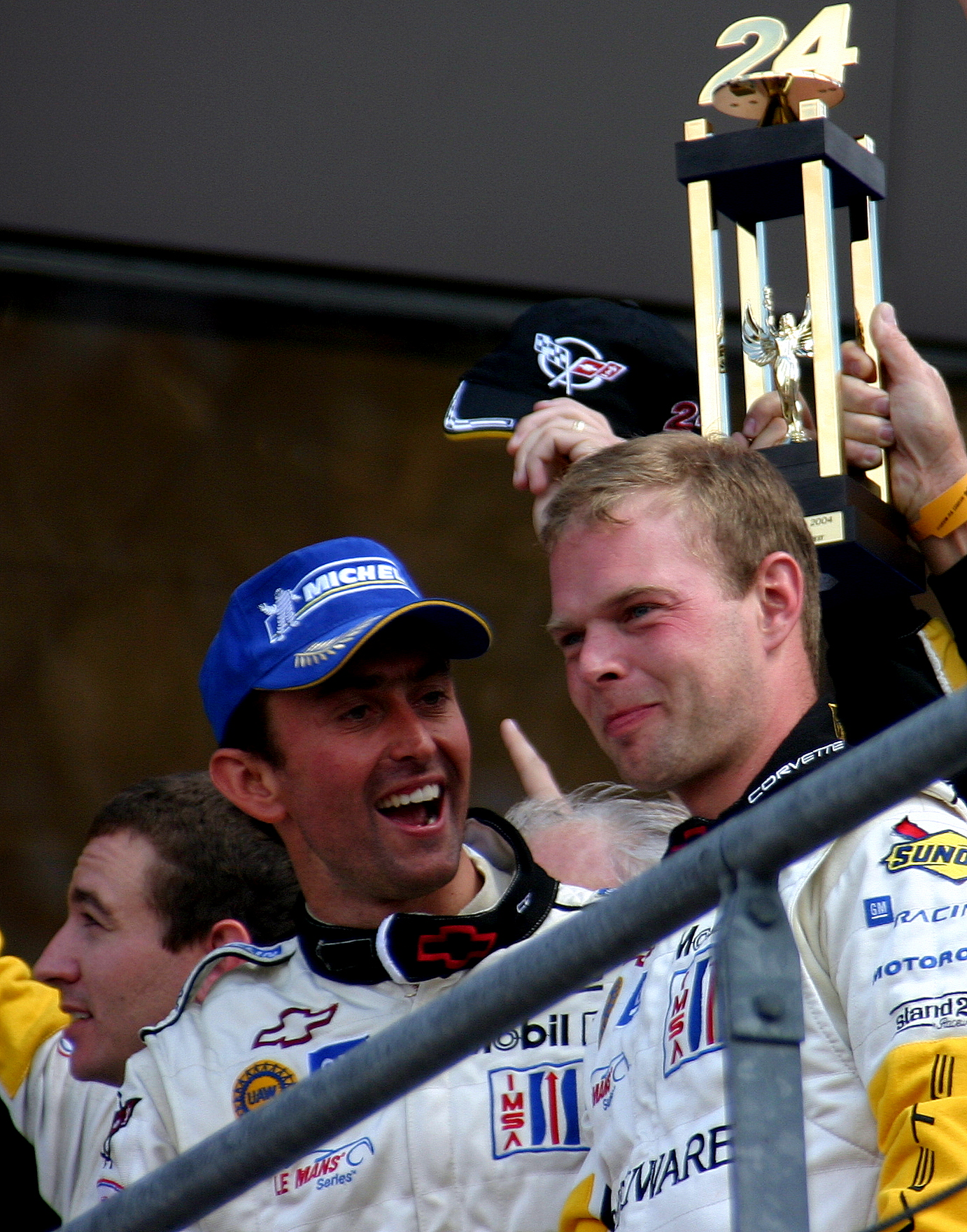
- Beretta (middle) at the 2004 24 Hours of Le Mans
- Born: Olivier Henri Aldo Léopold Beretta; 23 November 1969 (age 56) Monte Carlo, Monaco
- Categorisation: FIA Platinum (until 2019); FIA Gold (2020–)

Formula One World Championship career
- Nationality: (Monaco) Monégasque
- Active years: 1994
- Team: Larrousse
- Entries: 10 (9 starts)
- Championships: 0
- Wins: 0
- Podiums: 0
- Career points: 0
- Pole positions: 0
- Fastest laps: 0
- First entry: 1994 Brazilian Grand Prix
- Last entry: 1994 Hungarian Grand Prix

24 Hours of Le Mans career
- Years: 1996–2015, 2017–2019
- Teams: Team Oreca, JML Team Panoz, Corvette Racing, AF Corse
- Best finish: 4th (2001, 2006)
- Class wins: 6 (1999, 2000, 2004, 2005, 2006, 2011)

Olivier Henri Aldo Léopold Beretta (born 23 November 1969) is a professional racing driver from Monaco who raced in Formula One in 1994 for the Larrousse team, partnering Érik Comas. He participated in ten Grands Prix, debuting on 27 March 1994. He scored no championship points and was replaced when his sponsorship money ran out. During 2003 and 2004, he tested for the Williams team.

== Career ==
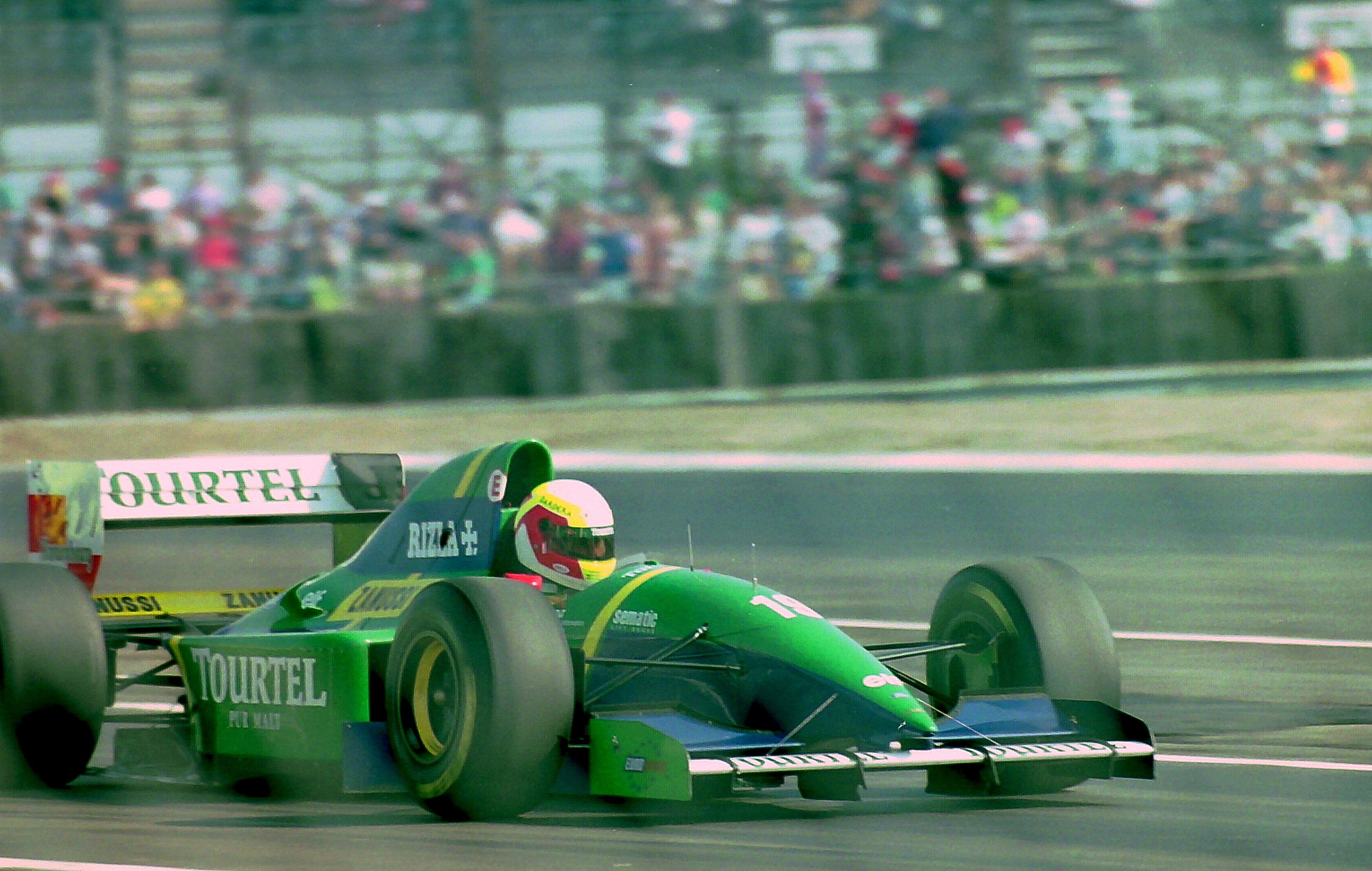
Beretta driving for Larrousse at the 1994 British Grand Prix

Born in Monte Carlo, Beretta has seen more success in sportscar racing, taking class wins at the 24 Hours of Le Mans with Viper GTS-Rs in 1999 (tenth overall) and 2000 (seventh overall), Corvettes in 2004 (C5-R, sixth overall), 2005 (C5-R, fifth overall) and 2006 (C6-R, fourth overall) and driving LMP900 class cars to sixth (2001), fourth (2002) and third (2003) place class finishes, and overall victories at the Daytona 24 Hours in the 2000 event.

Beretta made a single NASCAR Craftsman Truck Series start at Heartland Park Topeka in 1999 for Bobby Hamilton Racing, qualifying tenth and finishing 17th. Beretta was the first European to compete in the Truck Series, describing the vehicle as "much heavier" than expected and commenting that he "wasn't used to seeing my hands in front of me on the steering wheel. I'm used to them sitting much lower in the car."

For 2012, Beretta made the move from Corvette to Ferrari and started the season at the 2012 24 Hours of Daytona with Risi Competizione's Ferrari F458 Italia Grand Am. He competed in the FIA World Endurance Championship in a GTE-Pro class Ferrari F458 Italia for AF Corse.

== Racing record ==
=== Complete International Formula 3000 results ===
(key) (Races in bold indicate pole position) (Races in italics indicate fastest lap)

Year	Entrant	Chassis	Engine	1	2	3	4	5	6	7	8	9	10	Pos.	Pts
1992	Piquet Racing	Reynard 92D	Mugen Honda	SIL; 9	PAU; Ret	CAT; Ret	PER; Ret	HOC; Ret	NÜR; 9					NC	0
1992	Piquet Racing	Reynard 92D	Ford Cosworth							SPA; Ret	ALB; 17†	NOG; 9	MAG; Ret	NC	0
1993	Forti Corse	Reynard 93D	Ford Cosworth	**DON**; 1	SIL; 10	PAU; 4	PER; Ret	HOC; 4	NÜR; 5	SPA; 13	MAG; 9	NOG; 4		6th	20

=== Complete Formula One results ===
(key)

Year	Entrant	Chassis	Engine	1	2	3	4	5	6	7	8	9	10	11	12	13	14	15	16	WDC	Pts
1994	Tourtel Larrousse F1	Larrousse LH94	Ford HBF7/8 3.5 V8	BRA; Ret	PAC; Ret	SMR; Ret	MON; 8	ESP; DNS	CAN; Ret	FRA; Ret	GBR; 14	GER; 7	HUN; 9	BEL	ITA	POR	EUR	JPN	AUS	NC	0

=== Complete 24 Hours of Le Mans results ===
Year	Team	Co-Drivers	Car	Class	Laps	Pos.	Class Pos.
1995	(France) Courage Compétition	(Belgium) Eric van de Poele (Slovenia) Matiaz Tomlje	Courage C41-Chevrolet	WSC	-	DNQ	DNQ
1996	(France) Viper Team Oreca	(France) Philippe Gache (France) Éric Hélary	Chrysler Viper GTS-R	GT1	283	21st	12th
1997	(France) Viper Team Oreca	(France) Philippe Gache (France) Dominique Dupuy	Chrysler Viper GTS-R	GT2	263	DNF	DNF
1998	(France) Viper Team Oreca	(Portugal) Pedro Lamy (United States) Tommy Archer	Chrysler Viper GTS-R	GT2	312	13th	**2nd**
1999	(France) Viper Team Oreca	(Austria) Karl Wendlinger (France) Dominique Dupuy	Chrysler Viper GTS-R	GTS	325	10th	**1st**
2000	(France) Viper Team Oreca	(Austria) Karl Wendlinger (France) Dominique Dupuy	Chrysler Viper GTS-R	GTS	333	7th	**1st**
2001	(France) Team PlayStation	(Austria) Karl Wendlinger (Portugal) Pedro Lamy	Chrysler LMP	LMP900	298	4th	**3rd**
2002	(France) PlayStation Team Oreca	(France) Érik Comas (Portugal) Pedro Lamy	Dallara SP1-Judd	LMP900	359	5th	4th
2003	(United States) JML Team Panoz	(United States) Gunnar Jeannette (Italy) Max Papis	Panoz LMP01 Evo-Élan	LMP900	360	5th	**3rd**
2004	(United States) Corvette Racing	(United Kingdom) Oliver Gavin (Denmark) Jan Magnussen	Chevrolet Corvette C5-R	GTS	345	6th	**1st**
2005	(United States) Corvette Racing	(United Kingdom) Oliver Gavin (Denmark) Jan Magnussen	Chevrolet Corvette C6.R	GT1	349	5th	**1st**
2006	(United States) Corvette Racing	(United Kingdom) Oliver Gavin (Denmark) Jan Magnussen	Chevrolet Corvette C6.R	GT1	355	4th	**1st**
2007	(United States) Corvette Racing	(United Kingdom) Oliver Gavin (Italy) Max Papis	Chevrolet Corvette C6.R	GT1	22	DNF	DNF
2008	(United States) Corvette Racing	(United Kingdom) Oliver Gavin (Italy) Max Papis	Chevrolet Corvette C6.R	GT1	341	15th	**3rd**
2009	(United States) Corvette Racing	(United Kingdom) Oliver Gavin (Switzerland) Marcel Fässler	Chevrolet Corvette C6.R	GT1	311	DNF	DNF
2010	(United States) Corvette Racing	(United Kingdom) Oliver Gavin (France) Emmanuel Collard	Chevrolet Corvette C6.R	GT2	255	DNF	DNF
2011	(United States) Corvette Racing	(United States) Tommy Milner (Spain) Antonio García	Chevrolet Corvette C6.R	GTE; Pro	314	11th	**1st**
2012	(Italy) AF Corse	(Italy) Andrea Bertolini (Italy) Marco Cioci	Ferrari 458 Italia GTC	GTE; Pro	326	22nd	4th
2013	(Italy) AF Corse	(Japan) Kamui Kobayashi (Finland) Toni Vilander	Ferrari 458 Italia GTC	GTE; Pro	312	20th	5th
2014	(Italy) AF Corse	(Italy) Davide Rigon (Germany) Pierre Kaffer	Ferrari 458 Italia GTC	GTE; Pro	28	DNF	DNF
2015	(Italy) AF Corse	(Italy) Davide Rigon (United Kingdom) James Calado	Ferrari 458 Italia GT2	GTE; Pro	332	21st	**2nd**
2017	(Switzerland) Spirit of Race	(Switzerland) Thomas Flohr (Italy) Francesco Castellacci	Ferrari 488 GTE	GTE; Am	326	41st	12th
2018	(Japan) MR Racing	(Italy) Eddie Cheever III (Japan) Motoaki Ishikawa	Ferrari 488 GTE	GTE; Am	324	38th	9th
2019	(Japan) MR Racing	(Italy) Eddie Cheever III (Japan) Motoaki Ishikawa	Ferrari 488 GTE	GTE; Am	328	41st	10th

=== Complete FIA GT Championship results ===
(key) (Races in bold indicate pole position) (Races in italics indicate fastest lap)

Year	Team	Car	Class	1	2	3	4	5	6	7	8	9	10	11	Pos.	Pts
1997	Viper Team Oreca	Chrysler Viper GTS-R	GT2	HOC; 1	**SIL**; 3	HEL	**NÜR**; 17	**SPA**; 2	**A1R**; 2	**SUZ**; 1	**DON**; 1	**MUG**; Ret	**SEB**; 1	LAG; 3	3rd	60
1998	Viper Team Oreca	Chrysler Viper GTS-R	GT2	OSC; 1	SIL; 1	**HOC**; 1	**DIJ**; 1	HUN; 2	SUZ; 1	DON; 1	A1R; 2	HOM; 1	LAG; 1		1st	92
1999	Viper Team Oreca	Chrysler Viper GTS-R	GT	**MNZ**; 1	**SIL**; 1	HOC	**HUN**; 2	ZOL; 1	OSC; 1	DON; 1	**HOM**; 2	GLN; 2	ZHU; 1		1st	78
2002	Team A.R.T.	Chrysler Viper GTS-R	GT	MAG	SIL	BRN; Ret	JAR	AND	OSC	SPA	PER	DON	EST		NC	0
2007	Luc Alphand Aventures	Chevrolet Corvette C6.R	GT1	ZHU	SIL	BUC	MNZ	OSC	SPA; 6	ADR	BRN	NOG	ZOL		36th	7

=== Complete European Le Mans Series results ===
(key) (Races in bold indicate pole position; races in italics indicate fastest lap)

Year	Entrant	Class	Chassis	Engine	1	2	3	4	5	6	7	Pos.	Pts
2001	Team PlayStation	LMP900	Chrysler LMP	Mopar 6.0 V8	SEB	DON; 8	JAR	EST	MOS	VAL	PET	23rd	12
2007	Luc Alphand Aventures	GT1	Chevrolet Corvette C6.R	Chevrolet LS7.R 7.0L V8	MNZ	VAL	NÜR	SPA	SIL	**INT**; 2		25th	4
2008	Luc Alphand Aventures	GT1	Chevrolet Corvette C6.R	Chevrolet LS7.R 7.0L V8	CAT	**MNZ**; 2	SPA	NÜR; Ret	SIL			10th	8
2014	SMP Racing	GTC	Ferrari 458 Italia GT3	Ferrari 4.5 V8	SIL; 2	IMO; 2	RBR; 2	LEC; 1	EST; 3			1st	94

=== NASCAR ===
(key) (Bold – Pole position awarded by qualifying time. Italics – Pole position earned by points standings or practice time. * – Most laps led.)

==== Craftsman Truck Series ====
NASCAR Craftsman Truck Series results
Year	Team	No.	Make	1	2	3	4	5	6	7	8	9	10	11	12	13	14	15	16	17	18	19	20	21	22	23	24	25	NCTC	Pts	Ref
1999	Bobby Hamilton Racing	4	Dodge	HOM	PHO	EVG	MMR	MAR	MEM	PPR	I70	BRI	TEX	PIR	GLN	MLW	NSV	NZH	MCH	NHA	IRP	GTY	HPT; 17	RCH	LVS	LVL	TEX	CAL	87th	112	

=== Complete FIA World Endurance Championship results ===
(key) (Races in bold indicate pole position; races in italics indicate fastest lap)

Year	Entrant	Class	Car	Engine	1	2	3	4	5	6	7	8	9	Pos.	Pts
2012	AF Corse	LMGTE Pro	Ferrari 458 Italia GT2	Ferrari F142 4.5 V8	SEB; 1	SPA; 4	LMS; 4	SIL; Ret	SÃO; 4	BHR; 4	FUJ; 4	SHA; 3		53rd	3.5
2013	AF Corse	LMGTE Pro	Ferrari 458 Italia GT2	Ferrari F142 4.5 V8	SIL	SPA	LMS; 4	SÃO	COA	FUJ	SHA	BHR		16th	24
2014	AF Corse	LMGTE Pro	Ferrari 458 Italia GT2	Ferrari 4.5 V8	SIL	SPA	LMS; Ret	COA	FUJ	SHA	BHR	SÃO		NC	0
2015	AF Corse	LMGTE Pro	Ferrari 458 Italia GT2	Ferrari 4.5 V8	SIL	SPA	LMS; 2	NÜR	COA	FUJ	SHA	BHR		13th	36
2017	Spirit of Race	LMGTE Am	Ferrari 488 GTE	Ferrari F154CB 3.9 V8t	SIL	SPA	LMS; 7	NÜR	MEX	COA	FUJ	SHA	BHR	12th	12
2018–19	MR Racing	LMGTE Am	Ferrari 488 GTE	Ferrari F154CB 3.9 V8t	SPA; 5	LMS; 5	SIL; 7	FUJ; Ret	SHA; 6	SEB; 5	SPA; 8	LMS; 5		10th	71
2019–20	MR Racing	LMGTE Am	Ferrari 488 GTE Evo	Ferrari F154CB 3.9 L Turbo V8	SIL; 3	FUJ; 4	SHA; 7	BHR; 7	COA; 10	SPA	LMS	BHR		15th	43

=== Complete IMSA SportsCar Championship results ===
(key) (Races in bold indicate pole position) (Races in italics indicate fastest lap)

Year	Team	Class	Make	Engine	1	2	3	4	5	6	7	8	9	10	11	Pos.	Pts
2014	Risi Competizione	GTLM	Ferrari 458 Italia GT2	Ferrari F142 4.5 V8	DAY; 11	SEB	LBH	LAG	WGL	MOS	IMS	ROA	VIR	COA	PET; 11	45th	22
2015	Risi Competizione	GTLM	Ferrari 458 Italia GT2	Ferrari F142 4.5 V8	DAY; 9	SEB	LBH	LAG	WGL	MOS	ROA	VIR	COA	PET		26th	23
2016	Risi Competizione	GTLM	Ferrari 488 GTE	Ferrari F154CB 3.9 V8	DAY; 6	SEB	LBH	LAG	WGL	MOS	LIM	ROA	VIR	COA	PET	25th	26

Sporting positions
Preceded by Justin Bell	FIA GT Championship; GT2 Champion; 1998; With: Pedro Lamy	Succeeded by Mike Rockenfeller; Marc Lieb (2005)
Preceded by Klaus Ludwig; Ricardo Zonta	FIA GT Championship; Champion; 1999; With: Karl Wendlinger	Succeeded by Julian Bailey; Jamie Campbell-Walter
Preceded by Inaugural	American Le Mans Series; GTS Champion; 1999-2000	Succeeded by Terry Borcheller
Preceded by Ron Fellows; Johnny O'Connell (GTS)	American Le Mans Series; GT1 Champion; 2005-2007; With: Oliver Gavin	Succeeded by Jan Magnussen; Johnny O'Connell
Preceded by Fabio Babini; Kirill Ladygin; Viktor Shaytar	European Le Mans Series; GTC Champion; 2014; With: Anton Ladygin & Devi Markozov	Succeeded by Franck Perera; Eric Dermont; Dino Lunardi
