= 2008 FIA GT Tourist Trophy =

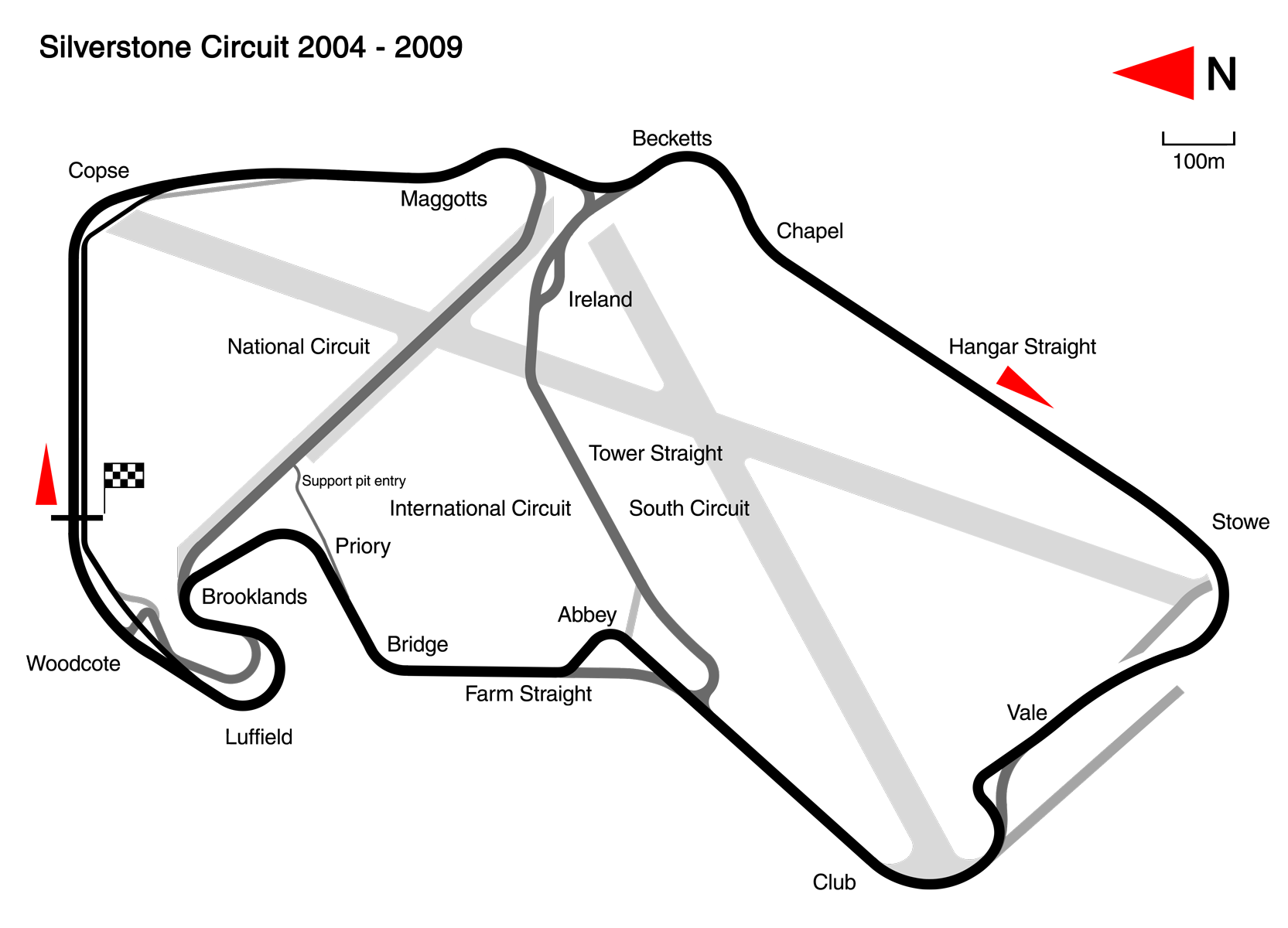
Map of the Silverstone Circuit (2004-2009)

The 2008 FIA GT Tourist Trophy was the opening race of the 2008 FIA GT Championship season. It took place at Silverstone Circuit, Great Britain, on 20 April 2008. It was the fourth time the RAC Tourist Trophy was held as a round of the FIA GT Championship.

== Race results ==
Class winners in bold. Cars failing to complete 75% of winner's distance marked as Not Classified (NC). Cars with a C under their class are running in the Citation Cup, with the winner marked in bold italics.

Pos	Class	No	Team	Drivers	Chassis	Tyre	Laps
Pos	Class	No	Team	Drivers	Engine	Tyre	Laps
1	**GT1**	**33**	**(Austria) Jetalliance Racing**	**(Austria) Karl Wendlinger (United Kingdom) Ryan Sharp**	**Aston Martin DBR9**	MI	**59**
1	**GT1**	**33**	**(Austria) Jetalliance Racing**	**(Austria) Karl Wendlinger (United Kingdom) Ryan Sharp**	**Aston Martin 6.0 L V12**	MI	**59**
2	GT1	1	(Germany) Vitaphone Racing Team	(Germany) Michael Bartels (Italy) Andrea Bertolini	Maserati MC12 GT1	MI	59
2	GT1	1	(Germany) Vitaphone Racing Team	(Germany) Michael Bartels (Italy) Andrea Bertolini	Maserati 6.0 L V12	MI	59
3	GT1	10	(United Kingdom) Gigawave Motorsport	(Austria) Philipp Peter (Denmark) Allan Simonsen	Aston Martin DBR9	MI	59
3	GT1	10	(United Kingdom) Gigawave Motorsport	(Austria) Philipp Peter (Denmark) Allan Simonsen	Aston Martin 6.0 L V12	MI	59
4	GT1	3	(Belgium) Selleslagh Racing Team	(France) Christophe Bouchut (Netherlands) Xavier Maassen	Chevrolet Corvette C6.R	MI	59
4	GT1	3	(Belgium) Selleslagh Racing Team	(France) Christophe Bouchut (Netherlands) Xavier Maassen	Chevrolet LS7R 7.0 L V8	MI	59
5	GT1	6	(Germany) Phoenix Carsport Racing	(Netherlands) Mike Hezemans (Italy) Fabrizio Gollin	Chevrolet Corvette C6.R	MI	59
5	GT1	6	(Germany) Phoenix Carsport Racing	(Netherlands) Mike Hezemans (Italy) Fabrizio Gollin	Chevrolet LS7R 7.0 L V8	MI	59
6	GT1	36	(Austria) Jetalliance Racing	(Austria) Lukas Lichtner-Hoyer (Germany) Alex Müller	Aston Martin DBR9	MI	59
6	GT1	36	(Austria) Jetalliance Racing	(Austria) Lukas Lichtner-Hoyer (Germany) Alex Müller	Aston Martin 6.0 L V12	MI	59
7	GT1	2	(Germany) Vitaphone Racing Team	(Portugal) Miguel Ramos (Brazil) Alexandre Negrão	Maserati MC12 GT1	MI	59
7	GT1	2	(Germany) Vitaphone Racing Team	(Portugal) Miguel Ramos (Brazil) Alexandre Negrão	Maserati 6.0 L V12	MI	59
8	GT1	5	(Germany) Phoenix Carsport Racing	(Switzerland) Jean-Denis Délétraz (Switzerland) Marcel Fässler	Chevrolet Corvette C6.R	MI	59
8	GT1	5	(Germany) Phoenix Carsport Racing	(Switzerland) Jean-Denis Délétraz (Switzerland) Marcel Fässler	Chevrolet LS7R 7.0 L V8	MI	59
9	GT1	7	(France) Larbre Compétition	(Belgium) Vincent Vosse (Belgium) Grégory Franchi	Saleen S7-R	MI	58
9	GT1	7	(France) Larbre Compétition	(Belgium) Vincent Vosse (Belgium) Grégory Franchi	Ford 7.0 L V8	MI	58
10	GT1	8	(Russia) IPB Spartak Racing (Germany) Reiter Engineering	(Russia) Roman Rusinov (Netherlands) Peter Kox	Lamborghini Murciélago R-GT	MI	58
10	GT1	8	(Russia) IPB Spartak Racing (Germany) Reiter Engineering	(Russia) Roman Rusinov (Netherlands) Peter Kox	Lamborghini L535 6.0 L V12	MI	58
11	**GT2**	**50**	**(Italy) AF Corse**	**(Italy) Gianmaria Bruni (Finland) Toni Vilander**	**Ferrari F430 GT2**	MI	**58**
11	**GT2**	**50**	**(Italy) AF Corse**	**(Italy) Gianmaria Bruni (Finland) Toni Vilander**	**Ferrari 4.0 L V8**	MI	**58**
12	GT2	56	(United Kingdom) CR Scuderia Racing	(United Kingdom) Andrew Kirkaldy (United Kingdom) Rob Bell	Ferrari F430 GT2	MI	57
12	GT2	56	(United Kingdom) CR Scuderia Racing	(United Kingdom) Andrew Kirkaldy (United Kingdom) Rob Bell	Ferrari 4.0 L V8	MI	57
13	GT1	13	(Austria) RBImmo Racing (Germany) Konrad Motorsport	(Netherlands) Jos Menten (Italy) Andrea Piccini	Saleen S7-R	P	57
13	GT1	13	(Austria) RBImmo Racing (Germany) Konrad Motorsport	(Netherlands) Jos Menten (Italy) Andrea Piccini	Ford 7.0 L V8	P	57
14	GT2	77	(Italy) BMS Scuderia Italia	(Italy) Paolo Ruberti (Italy) Matteo Malucelli	Ferrari F430 GT2	P	57
14	GT2	77	(Italy) BMS Scuderia Italia	(Italy) Paolo Ruberti (Italy) Matteo Malucelli	Ferrari 4.0 L V8	P	57
15	GT2	51	(Italy) AF Corse	(Italy) Thomas Biagi (San Marino) Christian Montanari	Ferrari F430 GT2	MI	57
15	GT2	51	(Italy) AF Corse	(Italy) Thomas Biagi (San Marino) Christian Montanari	Ferrari 4.0 L V8	MI	57
16	GT1	4	(Belgium) Peka Racing	(Belgium) Anthony Kumpen (Belgium) Bert Longin	Saleen S7-R	P	57
16	GT1	4	(Belgium) Peka Racing	(Belgium) Anthony Kumpen (Belgium) Bert Longin	Ford 7.0 L V8	P	57
17	GT2	55	(United Kingdom) CR Scuderia Racing	(Canada) Chris Niarchos (United Kingdom) Tim Mullen	Ferrari F430 GT2	MI	57
17	GT2	55	(United Kingdom) CR Scuderia Racing	(Canada) Chris Niarchos (United Kingdom) Tim Mullen	Ferrari 4.0 L V8	MI	57
18	GT2	60	(Belgium) Prospeed Competition	(Finland) Markus Palttala (Finland) Mikael Forsten	Porsche 997 GT3-RSR	MI	56
18	GT2	60	(Belgium) Prospeed Competition	(Finland) Markus Palttala (Finland) Mikael Forsten	Porsche 3.8 L Flat-6	MI	56
19	GT2	78	(Italy) BMS Scuderia Italia	(Switzerland) Joël Camathias (Italy) Davide Rigon	Ferrari F430 GT2	P	56
19	GT2	78	(Italy) BMS Scuderia Italia	(Switzerland) Joël Camathias (Italy) Davide Rigon	Ferrari 4.0 L V8	P	56
20	GT1	37	Escuderia ACA Argentina	(Argentina) Gastón Mazzacane (Argentina) Esteban Tuero	Ferrari 550-GTS Maranello	MI	56
20	GT1	37	Escuderia ACA Argentina	(Argentina) Gastón Mazzacane (Argentina) Esteban Tuero	Ferrari 5.9 L V12	MI	56
21	GT2	57	(Switzerland) Kessel Racing	(Switzerland) Henri Moser (Italy) Fabrizio del Monte	Ferrari F430 GT2	MI	56
21	GT2	57	(Switzerland) Kessel Racing	(Switzerland) Henri Moser (Italy) Fabrizio del Monte	Ferrari 4.0 L V8	MI	56
22	GT2	95	(Italy) Advanced Engineering (Argentina) PeCom Racing Team	(Argentina) Matías Russo (Argentina) Luís Pérez Companc	Ferrari F430 GT2	MI	56
22	GT2	95	(Italy) Advanced Engineering (Argentina) PeCom Racing Team	(Argentina) Matías Russo (Argentina) Luís Pérez Companc	Ferrari 4.0 L V8	MI	56
23	GT2	62	(United Kingdom) Scuderia Ecosse	(United Kingdom) Jamie Davies (Italy) Fabio Babini	Ferrari F430 GT2	P	56
23	GT2	62	(United Kingdom) Scuderia Ecosse	(United Kingdom) Jamie Davies (Italy) Fabio Babini	Ferrari 4.0 L V8	P	56
24	**GT1; C**	**12**	**(Austria) AT Racing (Austria) Renauer Motorsport Team**	**(Belarus) Alexander Talkanitsa (Germany) Wolfgang Kaufmann**	**Chevrolet Corvette C5-R**	MI	**55**
24	**GT1; C**	**12**	**(Austria) AT Racing (Austria) Renauer Motorsport Team**	**(Belarus) Alexander Talkanitsa (Germany) Wolfgang Kaufmann**	**Chevrolet LS7R 7.0 L V8**	MI	**55**
25	GT1	15	(Monaco) JMB Racing	(Netherlands) Peter Kutemann (United Kingdom) Ben Aucott	Maserati MC12 GT1	MI	54
25	GT1	15	(Monaco) JMB Racing	(Netherlands) Peter Kutemann (United Kingdom) Ben Aucott	Maserati 6.0 L V12	MI	54
26	GT2	59	(United Kingdom) Trackspeed Racing	(United Kingdom) Richard Williams (United Kingdom) David Ashburn	Porsche 997 GT3-RSR	P	54
26	GT2	59	(United Kingdom) Trackspeed Racing	(United Kingdom) Richard Williams (United Kingdom) David Ashburn	Porsche 3.8 L Flat-6	P	54
27	**G2**	**104**	**(Germany) Go To One Racing (Czech Republic) Charouz Racing System**	**(Czech Republic) Štepán Vojtech (Germany) Kenneth Heyer**	**Mosler MT900R**	MI	**52**
27	**G2**	**104**	**(Germany) Go To One Racing (Czech Republic) Charouz Racing System**	**(Czech Republic) Štepán Vojtech (Germany) Kenneth Heyer**	**Chevrolet LS7 7.0 L V8**	MI	**52**
28	G2	103	(Germany) Go To One Racing (Czech Republic) Charouz Racing System	(Czech Republic) Aleš Jirásek (Czech Republic) Adam Lacko	Mosler MT900R	MI	52
28	G2	103	(Germany) Go To One Racing (Czech Republic) Charouz Racing System	(Czech Republic) Aleš Jirásek (Czech Republic) Adam Lacko	Chevrolet LS7 7.0 L V8	MI	52
29	G2; C	111	(Slovakia) Autoracing Club Bratislava	(Slovakia) Miro Konôpka (United Kingdom) Sean Edwards	Saleen S7-R	MI	52
29	G2; C	111	(Slovakia) Autoracing Club Bratislava	(Slovakia) Miro Konôpka (United Kingdom) Sean Edwards	Ford 7.0 L V8	MI	52
30 DNF	G2	101	(Belgium) Belgian Racing	(Belgium) Bas Leinders (Belgium) Renaud Kuppens	Gillet Vertigo Streiff	P	28
30 DNF	G2	101	(Belgium) Belgian Racing	(Belgium) Bas Leinders (Belgium) Renaud Kuppens	Maserati 4.2 L V8	P	28
DSQ^{†}	GT2	61	(Belgium) Prospeed Competition	(France) Emmanuel Collard (United Kingdom) Richard Westbrook	Porsche 997 GT3-RSR	MI	57
DSQ^{†}	GT2	61	(Belgium) Prospeed Competition	(France) Emmanuel Collard (United Kingdom) Richard Westbrook	Porsche 3.8 L Flat-6	MI	57

† – #61 Prospeed Competition was disqualified after the race for failing technical inspection. The car was found to be below the minimum ride height.

== Statistics ==
- Pole Position – #5 Carsport Holland – 2:14.554
- Average Speed – 155.21 km/h

FIA GT Championship
Previous race: None	2008 season	Next race: 2008 FIA GT Monza 2 Hours
