= 2008 FIA GT Monza 2 Hours =

Layout of the Autodromo Nazionale Monza

The 2008 FIA GT Monza 2 Hours was the second race of the 2008 FIA GT Championship season. It took place at Autodromo Nazionale Monza, Italy, on May 18, 2008.

The #61 Prospeed Competition Porsche was initially disqualified after winning the GT2 class due to a refueling infraction. The team however appealed and their victory was reinstated.

== Race results ==
Class winners in bold. Cars failing to complete 75% of winner's distance marked as Not Classified (NC). Cars with a C under their class are running in the Citation Cup, with the winner marked in bold italics.

Pos	Class	No	Team	Drivers	Chassis	Tyre	Laps
Pos	Class	No	Team	Drivers	Engine	Tyre	Laps
1	**GT1**	**3**	**(Belgium) Selleslagh Racing Team**	**(France) Christophe Bouchut (Netherlands) Xavier Maassen**	**Chevrolet Corvette C6.R**	**MI**	**66**
1	**GT1**	**3**	**(Belgium) Selleslagh Racing Team**	**(France) Christophe Bouchut (Netherlands) Xavier Maassen**	**Chevrolet LS7R 7.0 L V8**	**MI**	**66**
2	GT1	2	(Germany) Vitaphone Racing Team	(Portugal) Miguel Ramos (Brazil) Alexandre Negrão	Maserati MC12 GT1	**MI**	66
2	GT1	2	(Germany) Vitaphone Racing Team	(Portugal) Miguel Ramos (Brazil) Alexandre Negrão	Maserati 6.0 L V12	**MI**	66
3	GT1	10	(United Kingdom) Gigawave Motorsport	(Austria) Philipp Peter (Denmark) Allan Simonsen	Aston Martin DBR9	**MI**	66
3	GT1	10	(United Kingdom) Gigawave Motorsport	(Austria) Philipp Peter (Denmark) Allan Simonsen	Aston Martin 6.0 L V12	**MI**	66
4	GT1	6	(Germany) Phoenix Carsport Racing	(Netherlands) Mike Hezemans (Italy) Fabrizio Gollin	Chevrolet Corvette C6.R	**MI**	66
4	GT1	6	(Germany) Phoenix Carsport Racing	(Netherlands) Mike Hezemans (Italy) Fabrizio Gollin	Chevrolet LS7R 7.0 L V8	**MI**	66
5	GT1	1	(Germany) Vitaphone Racing Team	(Germany) Michael Bartels (Italy) Andrea Bertolini	Maserati MC12 GT1	**MI**	66
5	GT1	1	(Germany) Vitaphone Racing Team	(Germany) Michael Bartels (Italy) Andrea Bertolini	Maserati 6.0 L V12	**MI**	66
6	GT1	4	(Belgium) Peka Racing	(Belgium) Anthony Kumpen (Belgium) Bert Longin	Saleen S7-R	**P**	65
6	GT1	4	(Belgium) Peka Racing	(Belgium) Anthony Kumpen (Belgium) Bert Longin	Ford 7.0 L V8	**P**	65
7	GT1	33	(Austria) Jetalliance Racing	(Austria) Karl Wendlinger (United Kingdom) Ryan Sharp	Aston Martin DBR9	**MI**	65
7	GT1	33	(Austria) Jetalliance Racing	(Austria) Karl Wendlinger (United Kingdom) Ryan Sharp	Aston Martin 6.0 L V12	**MI**	65
8	GT1	7	(France) Larbre Compétition	(Belgium) Vincent Vosse (Belgium) Grégory Franchi	Saleen S7-R	**MI**	65
8	GT1	7	(France) Larbre Compétition	(Belgium) Vincent Vosse (Belgium) Grégory Franchi	Ford 7.0 L V8	**MI**	65
9	GT1	15	(Monaco) JMB Racing	(France) Stéphane Daoudi (United Kingdom) Ben Aucott	Maserati MC12 GT1	**MI**	64
9	GT1	15	(Monaco) JMB Racing	(France) Stéphane Daoudi (United Kingdom) Ben Aucott	Maserati 6.0 L V12	**MI**	64
10	**GT2**	**61**	**(Belgium) Prospeed Competition**	**(France) Emmanuel Collard (United Kingdom) Richard Westbrook**	**Porsche 997 GT3-RSR**	**MI**	**64**
10	**GT2**	**61**	**(Belgium) Prospeed Competition**	**(France) Emmanuel Collard (United Kingdom) Richard Westbrook**	**Porsche 3.8 L Flat-6**	**MI**	**64**
11	GT2	50	(Italy) AF Corse	(Italy) Gianmaria Bruni (Finland) Toni Vilander	Ferrari F430 GT2	**MI**	64
11	GT2	50	(Italy) AF Corse	(Italy) Gianmaria Bruni (Finland) Toni Vilander	Ferrari 4.0 L V8	**MI**	64
12	GT2	51	(Italy) AF Corse	(Italy) Thomas Biagi (San Marino) Christian Montanari	Ferrari F430 GT2	**MI**	64
12	GT2	51	(Italy) AF Corse	(Italy) Thomas Biagi (San Marino) Christian Montanari	Ferrari 4.0 L V8	**MI**	64
13	GT2	62	(United Kingdom) Scuderia Ecosse	(United Kingdom) Jamie Davies (Italy) Fabio Babini	Ferrari F430 GT2	**P**	64
13	GT2	62	(United Kingdom) Scuderia Ecosse	(United Kingdom) Jamie Davies (Italy) Fabio Babini	Ferrari 4.0 L V8	**P**	64
14	GT1	37	Escuderia ACA Argentina	(Argentina) Gastón Mazzacane (Argentina) Esteban Tuero	Ferrari 550-GTS Maranello	**MI**	64
14	GT1	37	Escuderia ACA Argentina	(Argentina) Gastón Mazzacane (Argentina) Esteban Tuero	Ferrari 5.9 L V12	**MI**	64
15	GT2	77	(Italy) BMS Scuderia Italia	(Italy) Paolo Ruberti (Italy) Matteo Malucelli	Ferrari F430 GT2	**P**	63
15	GT2	77	(Italy) BMS Scuderia Italia	(Italy) Paolo Ruberti (Italy) Matteo Malucelli	Ferrari 4.0 L V8	**P**	63
16	GT2	78	(Italy) BMS Scuderia Italia	(Switzerland) Joël Camathias (Italy) Davide Rigon	Ferrari F430 GT2	**P**	63
16	GT2	78	(Italy) BMS Scuderia Italia	(Switzerland) Joël Camathias (Italy) Davide Rigon	Ferrari 4.0 L V8	**P**	63
17	GT2	56	(United Kingdom) CR Scuderia Racing	(United Kingdom) Andrew Kirkaldy (United Kingdom) Rob Bell	Ferrari F430 GT2	**MI**	63
17	GT2	56	(United Kingdom) CR Scuderia Racing	(United Kingdom) Andrew Kirkaldy (United Kingdom) Rob Bell	Ferrari 4.0 L V8	**MI**	63
18	GT2	55	(United Kingdom) CR Scuderia Racing	(United Kingdom) Tim Sugden (United Kingdom) Tim Mullen	Ferrari F430 GT2	**MI**	63
18	GT2	55	(United Kingdom) CR Scuderia Racing	(United Kingdom) Tim Sugden (United Kingdom) Tim Mullen	Ferrari 4.0 L V8	**MI**	63
19	**GT1; C**	**12**	**(Austria) AT Racing (Austria) Renauer Motorsport Team**	**(Belarus) Alexander Talkanitsa (Germany) Wolfgang Kaufmann**	**Chevrolet Corvette C5-R**	**MI**	**63**
19	**GT1; C**	**12**	**(Austria) AT Racing (Austria) Renauer Motorsport Team**	**(Belarus) Alexander Talkanitsa (Germany) Wolfgang Kaufmann**	**Chevrolet LS7R 7.0 L V8**	**MI**	**63**
20	GT2	95	(Italy) Advanced Engineering (Argentina) PeCom Racing Team	(Argentina) Matías Russo (Argentina) Luís Pérez Companc	Ferrari F430 GT2	**MI**	63
20	GT2	95	(Italy) Advanced Engineering (Argentina) PeCom Racing Team	(Argentina) Matías Russo (Argentina) Luís Pérez Companc	Ferrari 4.0 L V8	**MI**	63
21	GT2	57	(Switzerland) Kessel Racing	(Switzerland) Henri Moser (Italy) Fabrizio del Monte	Ferrari F430 GT2	**MI**	63
21	GT2	57	(Switzerland) Kessel Racing	(Switzerland) Henri Moser (Italy) Fabrizio del Monte	Ferrari 4.0 L V8	**MI**	63
22	GT2	60	(Belgium) Prospeed Competition	(Finland) Markus Palttala (Finland) Mikael Forsten	Porsche 997 GT3-RSR	**MI**	61
22	GT2	60	(Belgium) Prospeed Competition	(Finland) Markus Palttala (Finland) Mikael Forsten	Porsche 3.8 L Flat-6	**MI**	61
23	GT2	59	(United Kingdom) Trackspeed Racing	(United Kingdom) Richard Williams (United Kingdom) David Ashburn	Porsche 997 GT3-RSR	**P**	61
23	GT2	59	(United Kingdom) Trackspeed Racing	(United Kingdom) Richard Williams (United Kingdom) David Ashburn	Porsche 3.8 L Flat-6	**P**	61
24	**G2**	**101**	**(Belgium) Belgian Racing**	**(Belgium) Bas Leinders (Belgium) Renaud Kuppens**	**Gillet Vertigo Streiff**	**P**	**61**
24	**G2**	**101**	**(Belgium) Belgian Racing**	**(Belgium) Bas Leinders (Belgium) Renaud Kuppens**	**Maserati 4.2 L V8**	**P**	**61**
25	GT2	99	(Italy) Victor Racing	(Italy) Victor Coggiola (Italy) Giovanni Coggiola (Italy) Giorgio Coggiola	Porsche 997 GT3-RSR	**MI**	61
25	GT2	99	(Italy) Victor Racing	(Italy) Victor Coggiola (Italy) Giovanni Coggiola (Italy) Giorgio Coggiola	Porsche 3.8 L Flat-6	**MI**	61
26 DNF	GT1	8	(Russia) IPB Spartak Racing (Germany) Reiter Engineering	(Russia) Roman Rusinov (Netherlands) Peter Kox	Lamborghini Murciélago R-GT	**MI**	42
26 DNF	GT1	8	(Russia) IPB Spartak Racing (Germany) Reiter Engineering	(Russia) Roman Rusinov (Netherlands) Peter Kox	Lamborghini L535 6.0 L V12	**MI**	42
27 DNF	GT1	36	(Austria) Jetalliance Racing	(Austria) Lukas Lichtner-Hoyer (Germany) Alex Müller	Aston Martin DBR9	**MI**	41
27 DNF	GT1	36	(Austria) Jetalliance Racing	(Austria) Lukas Lichtner-Hoyer (Germany) Alex Müller	Aston Martin 6.0 L V12	**MI**	41
28 DNF	GT1	5	(Germany) Phoenix Carsport Racing	(Switzerland) Jean-Denis Délétraz (Switzerland) Marcel Fässler	Chevrolet Corvette C6.R	**MI**	41
28 DNF	GT1	5	(Germany) Phoenix Carsport Racing	(Switzerland) Jean-Denis Délétraz (Switzerland) Marcel Fässler	Chevrolet LS7R 7.0 L V8	**MI**	41
29 DNF	G2; C	111	(Slovakia) Autoracing Club Bratislava	(Slovakia) Miro Konopka (United Kingdom) Sean Edwards	Saleen S7-R	**MI**	26
29 DNF	G2; C	111	(Slovakia) Autoracing Club Bratislava	(Slovakia) Miro Konopka (United Kingdom) Sean Edwards	Ford 7.0 L V8	**MI**	26
30 DNF	G2	103	(Germany) Go To One Racing (Czech Republic) Charouz Racing System	(Czech Republic) Aleš Jirásek (Czech Republic) Adam Lacko	Mosler MT900R	**MI**	26
30 DNF	G2	103	(Germany) Go To One Racing (Czech Republic) Charouz Racing System	(Czech Republic) Aleš Jirásek (Czech Republic) Adam Lacko	Chevrolet LS7 7.0 L V8	**MI**	26
31 DNF	GT1	13	(Austria) iPos Racing (Germany) Konrad Motorsport	(Netherlands) Jos Menten (Italy) Andrea Piccini	Saleen S7-R	**P**	7
31 DNF	GT1	13	(Austria) iPos Racing (Germany) Konrad Motorsport	(Netherlands) Jos Menten (Italy) Andrea Piccini	Ford 7.0 L V8	**P**	7
32 DNF	GT1; C	22	(Italy) Lanza Motorsport	(Italy) Maurizio Strada (Italy) Massimo Morini (Italy) Mauro Simoncini	Chrysler Viper GTS-R	?	7
32 DNF	GT1; C	22	(Italy) Lanza Motorsport	(Italy) Maurizio Strada (Italy) Massimo Morini (Italy) Mauro Simoncini	Chrysler 8.0 L V10	?	7
33 DNF	G2	104	(Germany) Go To One Racing (Czech Republic) Charouz Racing System	(Czech Republic) Štepán Vojtech (Germany) Kenneth Heyer	Mosler MT900R	**MI**	4
33 DNF	G2	104	(Germany) Go To One Racing (Czech Republic) Charouz Racing System	(Czech Republic) Štepán Vojtech (Germany) Kenneth Heyer	Chevrolet LS7 7.0 L V8	**MI**	4
DNQ	GT1; C	21	(Switzerland) Kessel Racing	(Switzerland) Loris Kessel (Switzerland) Andrea Chiesa	Ferrari 575-GTC Maranello	**MI**	–
DNQ	GT1; C	21	(Switzerland) Kessel Racing	(Switzerland) Loris Kessel (Switzerland) Andrea Chiesa	Ferrari 6.0 L V12	**MI**	–

== Statistics ==
- Pole Position – #36 JetAlliance Racing – 1:49.258
- Average Speed – 190.10 km/h

FIA GT Championship
Previous race: 2008 FIA GT Tourist Trophy	2008 season	Next race: 2008 FIA GT Adria 2 Hours
