= 2002 FIA GT Brno 500km =

Layout of the Brno Circuit

The 2002 FIA GT Brno 500 km was the third round the 2002 FIA GT Championship season. It took place at the Brno Circuit, Czech Republic, on 19 May 2002.

== Official results ==
Class winners in bold. Cars failing to complete 70% of winner's distance marked as Not Classified (NC).

Pos	Class	No	Team	Drivers	Chassis	Tyre	Laps
Pos	Class	No	Team	Drivers	Engine	Tyre	Laps
1	**GT**	**14**	**(United Kingdom) Lister Storm Racing**	**(United Kingdom) Jamie Campbell-Walter (Germany) Nicolaus Springer**	**Lister Storm**	D	**85**
1	**GT**	**14**	**(United Kingdom) Lister Storm Racing**	**(United Kingdom) Jamie Campbell-Walter (Germany) Nicolaus Springer**	**Jaguar 7.0L V12**	D	**85**
2	GT	1	(France) Larbre Compétition Chereau	(France) Christophe Bouchut (France) David Terrien	Chrysler Viper GTS-R	MI	85
2	GT	1	(France) Larbre Compétition Chereau	(France) Christophe Bouchut (France) David Terrien	Chrysler 8.0L V10	MI	85
3	GT	4	(Netherlands) Team Carsport Holland (Italy) Racing Box	(Italy) Fabrizio Gollin (Italy) Luca Cappellari	Chrysler Viper GTS-R	P	85
3	GT	4	(Netherlands) Team Carsport Holland (Italy) Racing Box	(Italy) Fabrizio Gollin (Italy) Luca Cappellari	Chrysler 8.0L V10	P	85
4	GT	2	(France) Larbre Compétition Chereau	(Belgium) Vincent Vosse (Sweden) Carl Rosenblad	Chrysler Viper GTS-R	MI	85
4	GT	2	(France) Larbre Compétition Chereau	(Belgium) Vincent Vosse (Sweden) Carl Rosenblad	Chrysler 8.0L V10	MI	85
5	GT	12	(France) Paul Belmondo Racing	(Italy) Fabio Babini (Belgium) Marc Duez	Chrysler Viper GTS-R	P	83
5	GT	12	(France) Paul Belmondo Racing	(Italy) Fabio Babini (Belgium) Marc Duez	Chrysler 8.0L V10	P	83
6	GT	11	(France) Paul Belmondo Racing	(France) Paul Belmondo (Belgium) Robert Dierick	Chrysler Viper GTS-R	P	83
6	GT	11	(France) Paul Belmondo Racing	(France) Paul Belmondo (Belgium) Robert Dierick	Chrysler 8.0L V10	P	83
7	**N-GT**	**54**	**(Germany) Freisinger Motorsport**	**(Germany) Marc Lieb (Monaco) Stéphane Ortelli**	**Porsche 911 GT3-RS**	D	**82**
7	**N-GT**	**54**	**(Germany) Freisinger Motorsport**	**(Germany) Marc Lieb (Monaco) Stéphane Ortelli**	**Porsche 3.6L Flat-6**	D	**82**
8	N-GT	50	(France) JMB Racing	(Italy) Christian Pescatori (Italy) Andrea Montermini	Ferrari 360 Modena N-GT	P	82
8	N-GT	50	(France) JMB Racing	(Italy) Christian Pescatori (Italy) Andrea Montermini	Ferrari 3.6L V8	P	82
9	N-GT	58	(Italy) Autorlando Sport	(Austria) Philipp Peter (Austria) Toto Wolff	Porsche 911 GT3-RS	P	81
9	N-GT	58	(Italy) Autorlando Sport	(Austria) Philipp Peter (Austria) Toto Wolff	Porsche 3.6L Flat-6	P	81
10	N-GT	60	(Germany) JVG Racing	(Germany) Jürgen von Gartzen (United Kingdom) Ian Khan	Porsche 911 GT3-RS	P	81
10	N-GT	60	(Germany) JVG Racing	(Germany) Jürgen von Gartzen (United Kingdom) Ian Khan	Porsche 3.6L Flat-6	P	81
11	N-GT	53	(France) JMB Competition	(Italy) Marco Lambertini (Italy) Batti Pregliasco	Ferrari 360 Modena N-GT	P	81
11	N-GT	53	(France) JMB Competition	(Italy) Marco Lambertini (Italy) Batti Pregliasco	Ferrari 3.6L V8	P	81
12	N-GT	63	(Netherlands) System Force Motorsport	(Netherlands) Phil Bastiaans (Netherlands) Peter Van Merksteijn	Porsche 911 GT3-RS	P	81
12	N-GT	63	(Netherlands) System Force Motorsport	(Netherlands) Phil Bastiaans (Netherlands) Peter Van Merksteijn	Porsche 3.6L Flat-6	P	81
13	N-GT	62	(United Kingdom) Cirtek Motorsport	(United Kingdom) Kelvin Burt (Slovakia) Jirko Malchárek	Porsche 911 GT3-RS	D	81
13	N-GT	62	(United Kingdom) Cirtek Motorsport	(United Kingdom) Kelvin Burt (Slovakia) Jirko Malchárek	Porsche 3.6L Flat-6	D	81
14	N-GT	77	(Germany) RWS Motorsport	(Russia) Alexey Vasilyev (Russia) Nikolai Fomenko	Porsche 911 GT3-R	P	81
14	N-GT	77	(Germany) RWS Motorsport	(Russia) Alexey Vasilyev (Russia) Nikolai Fomenko	Porsche 3.6L Flat-6	P	81
15	N-GT	55	(Germany) Freisinger Motorsport	(France) Stéphane Daoudi (Belgium) Bert Longin	Porsche 911 GT3-RS	D	80
15	N-GT	55	(Germany) Freisinger Motorsport	(France) Stéphane Daoudi (Belgium) Bert Longin	Porsche 3.6L Flat-6	D	80
16	GT	16	(Germany) Proton Competition	(Germany) Gerold Ried (Italy) Mauro Casadei	Porsche 911 GT2	Y	80
16	GT	16	(Germany) Proton Competition	(Germany) Gerold Ried (Italy) Mauro Casadei	Porsche 3.6L Turbo Flat-6	Y	80
17	N-GT	68	(Czech Republic) Sport Team NH Car	(Czech Republic) Josef Venc (Czech Republic) Václav Nimč	Porsche 911 GT3-RS	D	79
17	N-GT	68	(Czech Republic) Sport Team NH Car	(Czech Republic) Josef Venc (Czech Republic) Václav Nimč	Porsche 3.6L Flat-6	D	79
18	N-GT	67	(Slovakia) Machánek Racing	(Slovakia) Andrej Studenic (Slovakia) Rudolf Machánek	Porsche 911 GT3-RS	D	79
18	N-GT	67	(Slovakia) Machánek Racing	(Slovakia) Andrej Studenic (Slovakia) Rudolf Machánek	Porsche 3.6L Flat-6	D	79
19	GT	24	(Poland) Alda Motorsport	(Poland) Maciej Stanco (Poland) Andrzej Dziurka (Poland) Maciej Marcinkiewicz	Porsche 911 GT2	D	78
19	GT	24	(Poland) Alda Motorsport	(Poland) Maciej Stanco (Poland) Andrzej Dziurka (Poland) Maciej Marcinkiewicz	Porsche 3.8L Flat-6	D	78
20	GT	3	(Netherlands) Team Carsport Holland (Italy) Racing Box	(Netherlands) Mike Hezemans (Belgium) Anthony Kumpen	Chrysler Viper GTS-R	P	75
20	GT	3	(Netherlands) Team Carsport Holland (Italy) Racing Box	(Netherlands) Mike Hezemans (Belgium) Anthony Kumpen	Chrysler 8.0L V10	P	75
21	GT	7	(Germany) RWS Motorsport	(Austria) Dieter Quester (Italy) Luca Riccitelli	Porsche 911 GT	P	64
21	GT	7	(Germany) RWS Motorsport	(Austria) Dieter Quester (Italy) Luca Riccitelli	Porsche 3.9L Flat-6	P	64
22 NC	GT	17	(Germany) Proton Competition	(Austria) Horst Felbermayr, Sr. (Austria) Horst Felbermayr, Jr.	Porsche 911 GT2	Y	58
22 NC	GT	17	(Germany) Proton Competition	(Austria) Horst Felbermayr, Sr. (Austria) Horst Felbermayr, Jr.	Porsche 3.6L Turbo Flat-6	Y	58
23 DNF	GT	9	(France) Team A.R.T.	(France) Jean-Pierre Jarier (Monaco) Olivier Beretta	Chrysler Viper GTS-R	P	49
23 DNF	GT	9	(France) Team A.R.T.	(France) Jean-Pierre Jarier (Monaco) Olivier Beretta	Chrysler 8.0L V10	P	49
24 DNF	GT	15	(United Kingdom) Lister Storm Racing	(United Kingdom) Bobby Verdon-Roe (United Kingdom) Paul Knapfield	Lister Storm	D	47
24 DNF	GT	15	(United Kingdom) Lister Storm Racing	(United Kingdom) Bobby Verdon-Roe (United Kingdom) Paul Knapfield	Jaguar 7.0L V12	D	47
25 DNF	GT	23	(Italy) BMS Scuderia Italia	(Italy) Andrea Piccini (Switzerland) Jean-Denis Délétraz (Czech Republic) Tomáš Enge	Ferrari 550-GTS Maranello	MI	30
25 DNF	GT	23	(Italy) BMS Scuderia Italia	(Italy) Andrea Piccini (Switzerland) Jean-Denis Délétraz (Czech Republic) Tomáš Enge	Ferrari 5.9L V12	MI	30
26 DNF	N-GT	69	(Czech Republic) Vonka Racing	(Czech Republic) Jan Vonka (Czech Republic) Michel Dolák	Porsche 911 GT3-R	P	23
26 DNF	N-GT	69	(Czech Republic) Vonka Racing	(Czech Republic) Jan Vonka (Czech Republic) Michel Dolák	Porsche 3.6L Flat-6	P	23
27 DNF	GT	22	(Italy) BMS Scuderia Italia	(Switzerland) Enzo Calderari (Switzerland) Lilian Bryner (Switzerland) Frédéric Dor	Ferrari 550-GTS Maranello	MI	19
27 DNF	GT	22	(Italy) BMS Scuderia Italia	(Switzerland) Enzo Calderari (Switzerland) Lilian Bryner (Switzerland) Frédéric Dor	Ferrari 5.9L V12	MI	19
28 DNF	N-GT	51	(France) JMB Racing	(Italy) Andrea Bertolini (Italy) Andrea Garbagnati	Ferrari 360 Modena N-GT	P	18
28 DNF	N-GT	51	(France) JMB Racing	(Italy) Andrea Bertolini (Italy) Andrea Garbagnati	Ferrari 3.6L V8	P	18
DNS	GT	5	(France) Force One Racing	(France) David Hallyday (France) Philippe Alliot	Ferrari 550 Maranello	MI	–
DNS	GT	5	(France) Force One Racing	(France) David Hallyday (France) Philippe Alliot	Ferrari 6.0L V12	MI	–

== Statistics ==
- Pole position – #23 BMS Scuderia Italia – 1:58.501
- Fastest lap – #23 BMS Scuderia Italia – 2:00.028
- Average speed – 151.790 km/h

FIA GT Championship
Previous race: 2002 FIA GT Silverstone 500km	2002 season	Next race: 2002 FIA GT Jarama 500km
