= Chevrolet Corvette C6.R =

Grand tourer endurance racing car

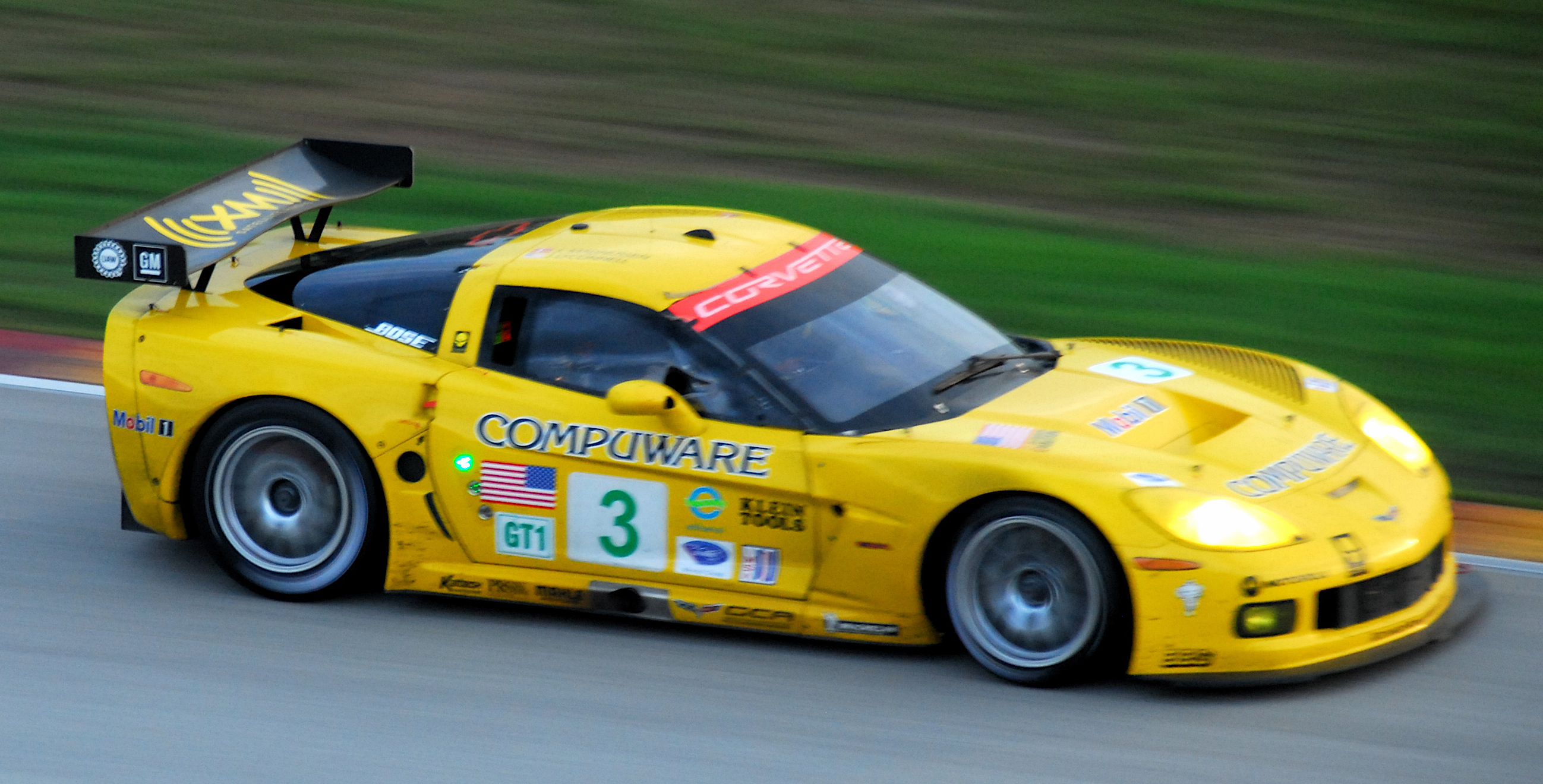
- The No.3 C6.R at the 2007 Generac 500

Overview
- Manufacturer: Chevrolet (Pratt Miller)
- Production: 2005–2011 (GT1); 2009–2013 (GT2)
- Designer: Doug Louth (Engineering Director, Corvette Racing)

Body and chassis
- Class: GT1, LM GTE/FIA GT2
- Body style: 2-door coupe
- Platform: Modified VH
- Related: Corvette Z06.R GT3 Chevrolet Corvette (C6)

Powertrain
- Engine: 7.0L Katech-built and assembled LS7.R V8 (GT1) (2005–2011); 6.0L V8 (Z06 GT2) (2009); 5.5L LS5.5R V8 (GT2) (2010–2013)
- Power output: GT1: 570–590 brake horsepower (430–440 kW) @ 5,400 rpm 841–868 newton-metres (620–640 lbf⋅ft) @ 4,400 rpm GT2: 491 brake horsepower (366 kW) @ 5,800 rpm 658 newton-metres (485 lbf⋅ft) @ 4,800 rpm Z06 GT2: 480 brake horsepower (360 kW) @ 5,500 rpm 550 newton-metres (410 lbf⋅ft) @ 4,500 rpm
- Transmission: Xtrac P370/P529 6-speed sequential manual

Dimensions
- Wheelbase: 2,685 mm (106 in)
- Length: 4,511 mm (178 in)
- Width: 1,999 mm (79 in)
- Height: 1,163 mm (46 in)
- Curb weight: GT1: 1,100 kilograms (2,400 lb); GT2: 1,245 kilograms (2,745 lb); Z06 GT2: 1,250 kilograms (2,760 lb)

Chronology
- Predecessor: Chevrolet Corvette C5-R
- Successor: Chevrolet Corvette C7.R

The Chevrolet Corvette C6.R is a grand tourer racing car built by Pratt Miller and Chevrolet for competition in endurance racing. It is a replacement for the Corvette C5-R racing car, applying the body style of the new C6 generation Chevrolet Corvette as well as improvements to increase the speed and reliability on the track. Since its debut in 2005, it has continued on from the previous dominance of the C5-R in its racing class with multiple American Le Mans Series championships and race wins in the Le Mans Series, FIA GT Championship, and 24 Hours of Le Mans. There are two main versions of the Corvette C6.R: the GT1 version which has 590 HP, carbon ceramic brakes, and aggressive aerodynamics, and the GT2 version which has 470 HP, cast-iron brakes, and relatively stock aerodynamics with respect to the road car. Unrestricted though, the LS7.R engine will produce around 800 hp. By 2012 the C6.R GT1 was retired from the competition while the GT2 version continues to race around the world.

== Development ==
Having already established the C5-R as a winning car, the development of the C6.R was more of an evolution of a design rather than an all new car which required long periods of testing and design. Pratt Miller's process was aided by the fact that, unlike the C5-R which debuted several years after the C5 generation Corvette was on the streets, the C6.R and C6 generation Corvettes would be developed at the same time. This meant that design elements which would help the race car could be adapted to the road car, allowing the C6.R to use more exotic design features but still meet homologation requirements. In turn, this meant racing elements could be adapted to the Corvette Z06 performance car, which the C6.R shares it exterior styling with.

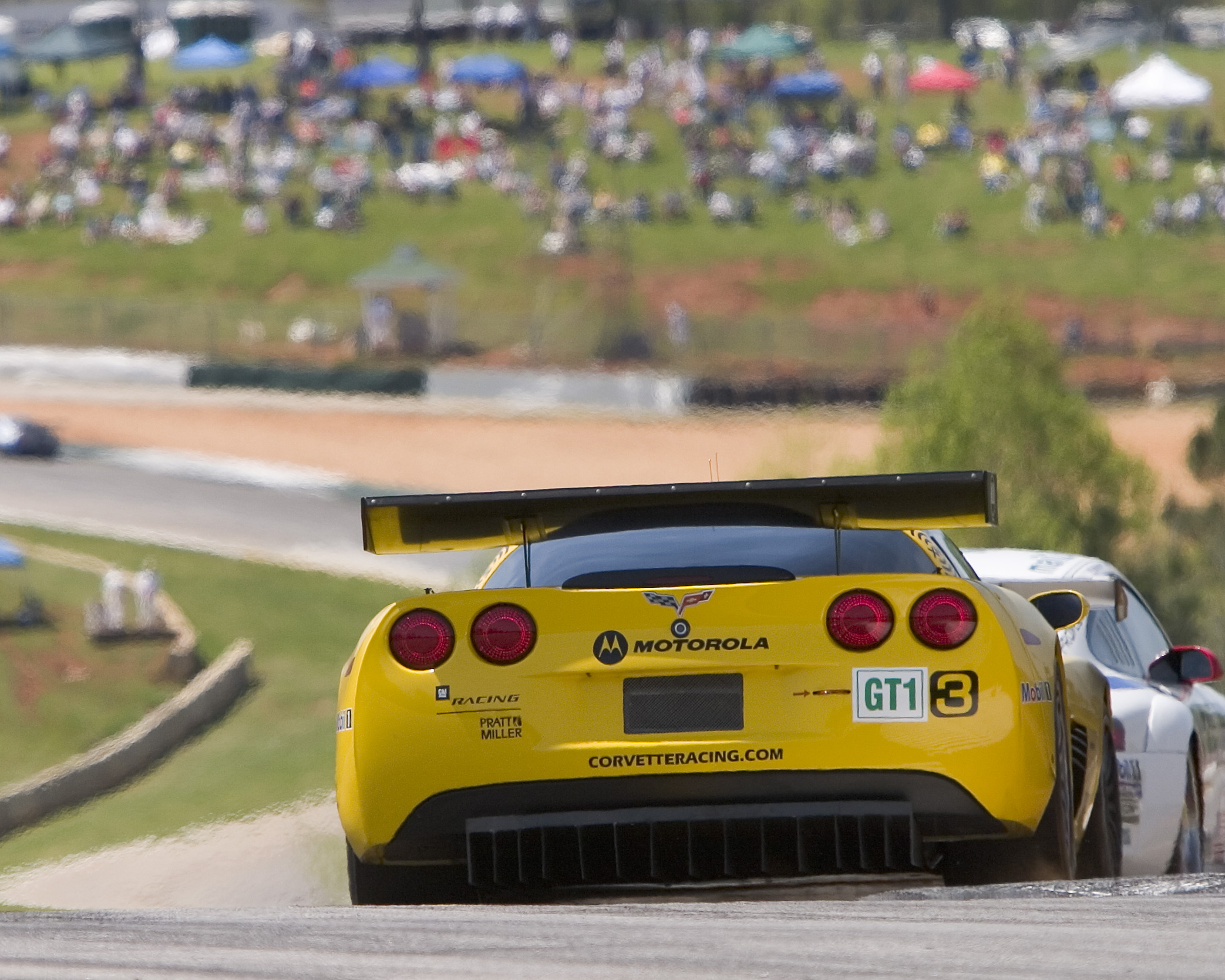
A rear-view of a C6.R, showing the air conditioner exhaust fan located in the center of the bodywork.

Much of the framework of the road legal C6 was retained on the C6.R, leading to increased use of weight-saving aluminium. The road car would also replace the C5's pop-up headlamps with permanent designs integrated into the bodywork. This meant that the racing car would have better air flow over the front of the car, doing away with their replacements for the pop-up headlamps which stuck out of the bodywork. The large grill opening on the car would also serve to eliminate the variety of openings on the C5-R to feed not only the brake cooling ducts, but also help with downforce by exiting back out the top of the hood.

Underneath, the C6.R retained much of the mechanical elements from the C5-R. The same Katech-built 7.0 litre V8 was used, but more closely based on the LS7 from the Z06. This engine, known as the LS7.R, would go on to earn the Global Motorsports Engine of the Year award in 2006 for its performance and endurance capabilities. Like the C5-R, the C6.R lacked a rear window due to structural framework and fuel tanks taking up the space behind the cockpit. However, an innovation on the C6.R was the addition of a small video camera into the rear bumper, and a monitor placed on the roof of the cockpit. This allowed the drivers a better view behind them, instead of having to rely on their side mirrors.

Another innovation was the use of an air conditioning system in the car in order to help drivers better endure high cockpit temperatures. This required the addition of a large suction fan to the rear of the car, as well as intakes integrated into the side mirrors. One innovation which the C6.R debuted in 2007 was the use of variable displacement. This system would disable half of the cylinders in the engine during caution periods in order to increase fuel economy when speed was not important. Although the system was tested during the season, its failure at the 2007 24 Hours of Le Mans led the team to remove it from the cars until it could be further evaluated.

As of the end of the 2007 season, six C6.Rs had been built by Pratt Miller. A seventh car, used for development work, was actually built on a C5-R chassis but adapted to carry C6.R bodywork. This car has never raced and is used merely as a show car, making its public debut alongside the C6 Corvette at the 2005 North American International Auto Show.

== Racing history ==
=== Corvette Racing ===
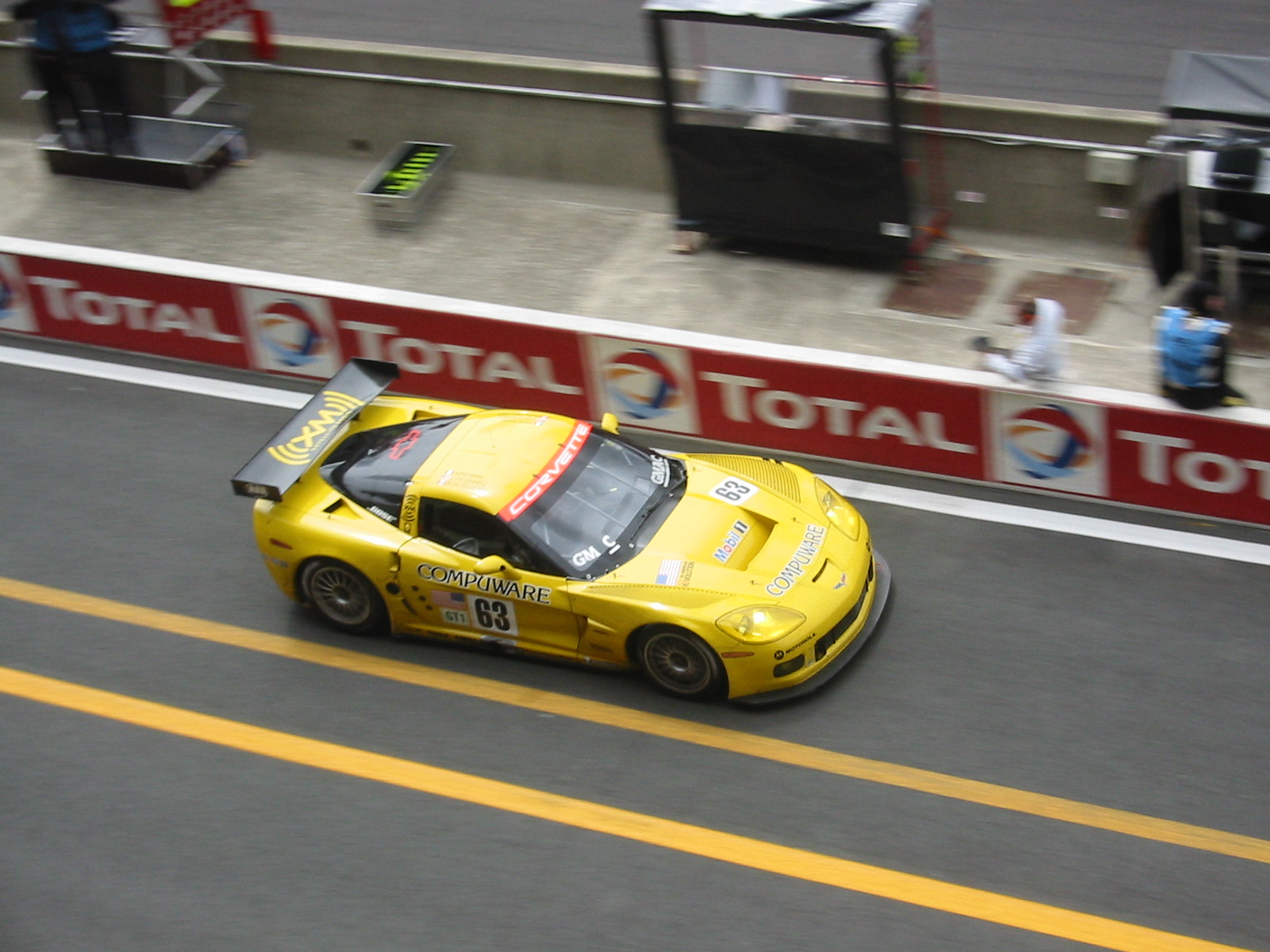
A C6.R driving down the pit lane during the 2005 24 Hours of Le Mans.

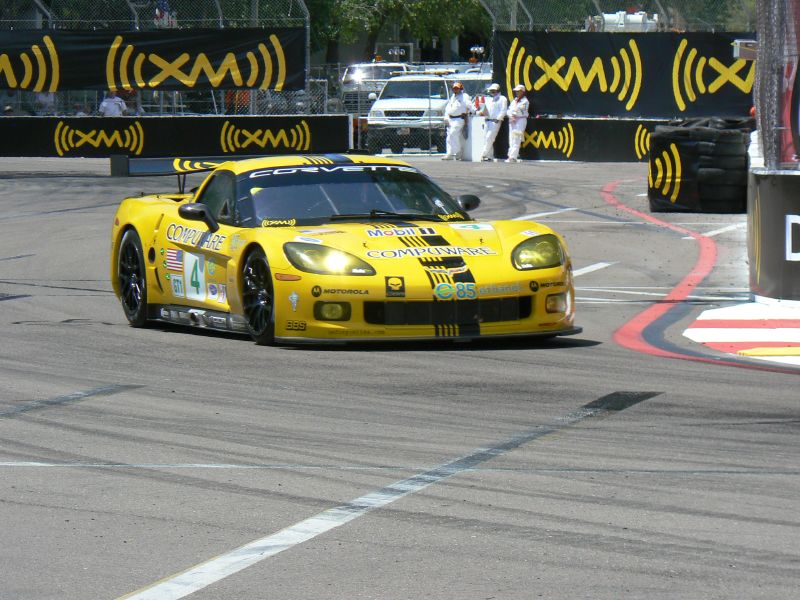
The C6.R in 2008, now running E85 ethanol fuel.

Following the retirement of the C5-R at the end of 2004, the factory Corvette Racing squad started 2005 with two brand new C6.Rs. Unlike the previous car, which ran only select events until it could be proven quick and reliable, the C6.Rs would compete in the full American Le Mans Series season in their first year. The season did not begin as Corvette Racing had planned however, as the equally new Prodrive Aston Martin DBR9 managed to win the initial event at Sebring, earning Corvette Racing their first loss since the end of 2003. Prodrive returned to Europe after Sebring, and Corvette Racing was able to earn wins in each of the succeeding races that season. Even when Prodrive returned for the final two rounds, the improved Corvettes continued their streak and won both races. The C6.Rs also ventured to Europe for the 24 Hours of Le Mans, where the team was able to outlast the quicker DBR9s to earn a 1–2 victory in the GT1 class and finish fifth and sixth overall.

In 2006, Prodrive chose to concentrate on the American Le Mans Series, giving Corvette Racing a battle throughout the season. Corvette Racing avenged their loss at Sebring, but Aston Martin managed their own victories later in the season. The two teams were close in the points championship throughout the season, before Corvette Racing managed to earn a three-point margin in the last race and won their second straight championship. At Le Mans, the Aston Martins once again faltered with reliability problems after leading the event, allowing a Corvette C6.R to finish the race fourth overall and win the GT1 class. The Aston Martin - Corvette duel at Le Mans saw both rivals finishing with a record-breaking pace for homologated GT cars, with the distance record set by Corvette Racing unbroken as of 2022.

Following the 2006 season, Prodrive returned to Europe to concentrate on improving the DBR9 for Le Mans. This meant that Corvette Racing was left without a major opponent in the American Le Mans Series, and in fact were the only competitors in the GT1 class for nine out of twelve races that year, and easily allowing Corvette Racing to earn their third championship. At Le Mans, the Corvettes were not able to repeat their previous success as Aston Martin was finally able to reliably maintain their pace over 24 hours and earn their first class victory, leaving Corvette Racing with second.

In order to honor Canadian driver Ron Fellows, Corvette Racing entered a third C6.R at the Grand Prix of Mosport. This third car was painted in white and red colors to match the Ron Fellows Edition Corvette Z06, a limited edition road car in honor of Fellows's involvement with the Corvette Racing program since its inception. Ron Fellows drove the car for his home race.

Corvette Racing ran the GT1 C6.Rs in the early events of the 2009 American Le Mans Series season and retired their cars at the 2009 24 Hours of Le Mans to focus on their new GT2 program.

Two cars were entered in the LMGTE Pro category at the 2012 24 Hours of Le Mans, weighing 1245 kg. One car was not classified, with the other achieving 23rd place overall.

Corvette Racing previously campaigned the C6.R GT2 in the American Le Mans Series GT class. The team also competed with the cars at the 24 Hours of Le Mans and won the 2011 GTE-Pro class.

=== Privateer teams ===
Like the C5-R, C6.Rs which had been used by the factory team eventually ended up in the hands of privateers once they were replaced by newer chassis. Unlike before, these Corvettes were sold less than a year after they had debuted, rather than the four years it took for a C5-R to be sold to another team. Corvette Motorsport, based in Belgium, currently handles the unity of teams and media promotion for the privateers currently competing in Europe.

==== GLPK-Carsport ====
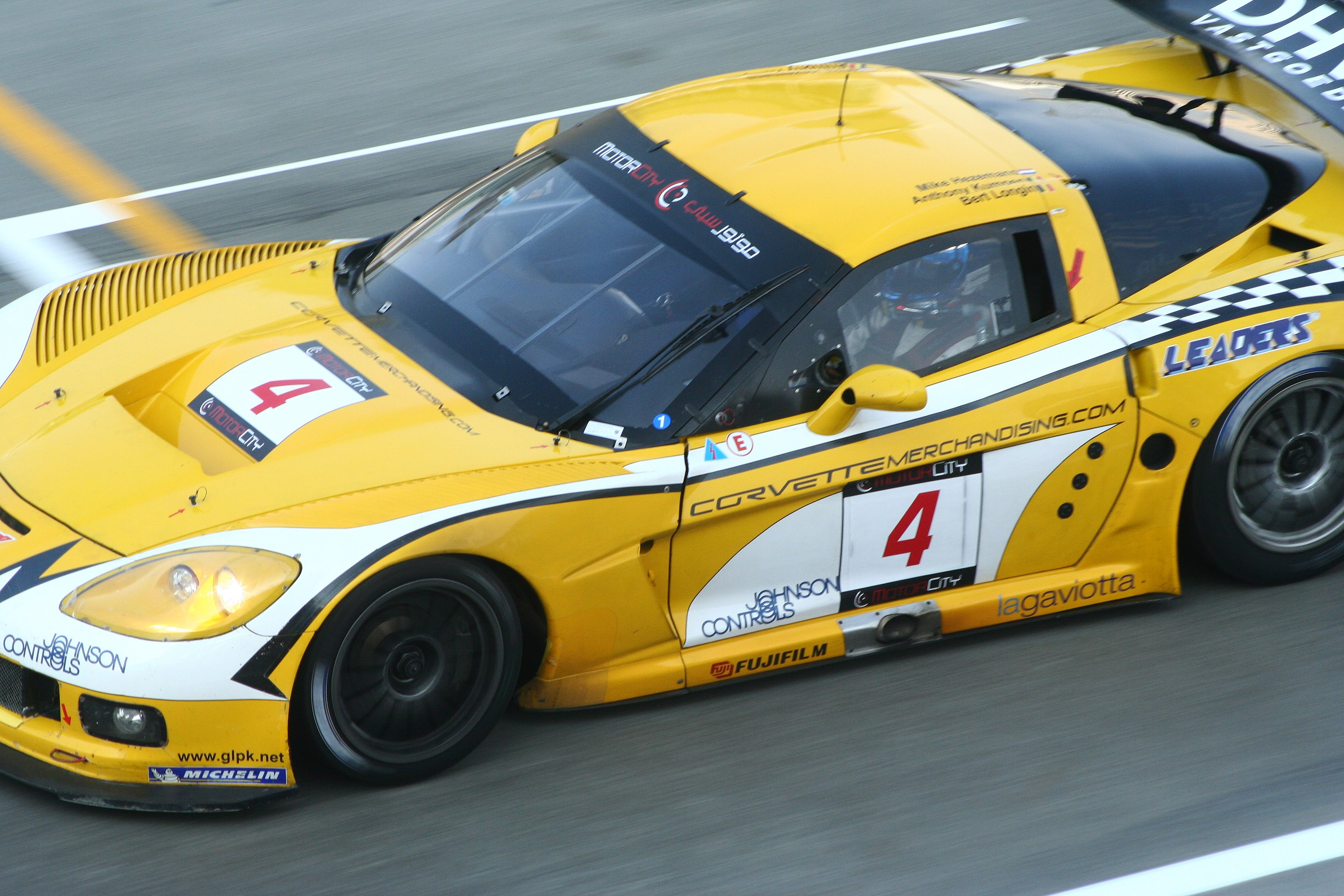
GLPK-Carsport's C6.R running in the 2006 FIA GT Dubai 500km.

GLPK-Carsport was formed by Belgian entrepreneur Paul Kumpen and Toine Hezemans following a merger of PK Carsport and Carsport Holland. After running the C5-R successfully in 2005, Toine Hezemans decided to buy one of the two C6.Rs used by Corvette Racing during the 2005 season. GLPK-Carsport added this chassis to their stable to replace their C5-R in the FIA GT Championship. The driving team of Bert Longin, Anthony Kumpen, and Mike Hezemans drove the car throughout the season, and were able to score a victory at Paul Ricard as well as a third-place finish at the Spa 24 Hours.

==== Carsport Holland ====
In 2007, GLPK-Carsport's partnership ended and Carsport Holland merged with new partner Jean-Denis Délétraz's Phoenix Racing to form Carsport Holland. Carsport Holland won the Spa 24 Hours. Joined by Marcel Fässler and Fabrizio Gollin, the team was able to fend off the Vitaphone Racing Maserati and earn Corvette's first victory at the endurance event. Carsport Holland earned one final victory at Nogaro before closing the season fourth in the teams' championship and third in the drivers' championship.

In 2008 the team partnered with GMAC and entered two C6.Rs and scored several pole positions and 2 race wins. After gaining one win and five pole positions, Marcel Fässler was hired by the factory Corvette Racing squad in late 2008.

==== PK Carsport ====
Following GLPK-Carsport's split in 2007, PK Racing returned to campaigning their C5-R before switching to a Saleen in 2008. PK Racing however returned to the C6.R chassis in 2009, merging with Phoenix Racing following Toine Hezemans's withdrawal of Carsport Holland from their previous partnership. The team currently has 2 wins this season including the 24 Hours of Spa, Corvette's 2nd win in the race in the last 3 years.

==== DKR Engineering ====
Belgian PSI Experience chose to concentrate their efforts on the French FFSA GT Championship as well as joining the Le Mans Series during their debut in 2006. The team earned one victory at Lédenon for FFSA, while a third at the 1000 km of Spa was their best result in the LMS. PSI also chose to enter a few FIA GT rounds, most notably the Spa 24 Hours. The team finished fifth in the event, before joining FIA GT once again at Paul Ricard and finishing second behind GLPK-Carsport's C6.R.

For 2007, PSI's C6.R was entered mostly in FFSA GT events, while select appearances in FIA GT as well as the 24 Hours of Le Mans were made. Starting in 2008, the owner of PSI loaned both of his cars to friends Dany Lallemand and Kendy Janclaes of DKR Engineering to form their own team using PSI's mechanics. The team mostly competes in the FFSA French GT with occasional appearances in the FIA GT.

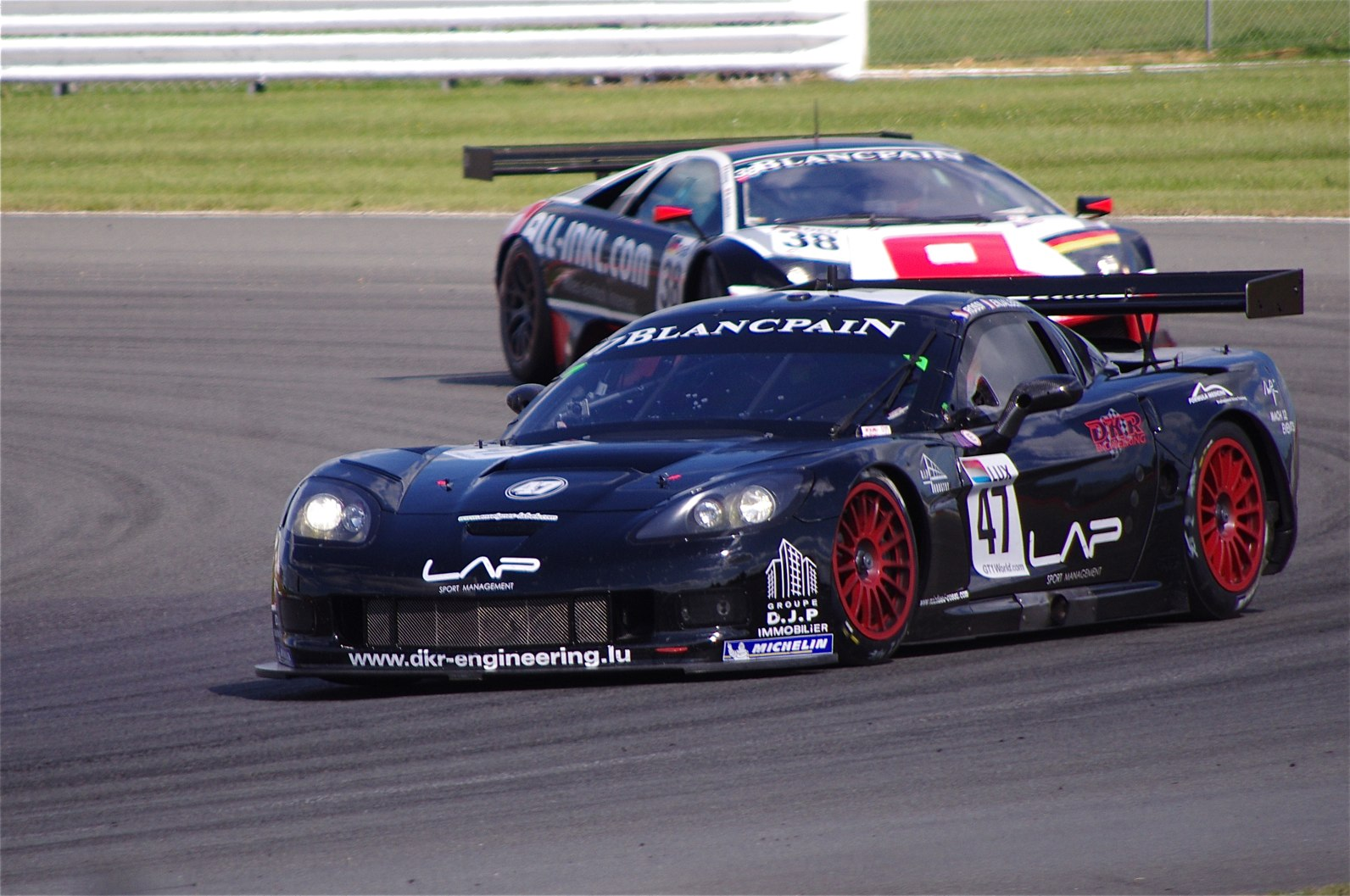
The No. 47 DKR Engineering Corvette C6.R during the 2011 RAC Tourist Trophy

In June 2009, the team was transformed to Sangari Team Brazil, the first Brazilian team in FIA GT, to further Brazilian interest and participation. DKR Engineering stills runs the car and provides technical assistance. The drivers will be Enrique Bernoldi and Roberto Streit. The team made their debut appearance at the Spa 24 Hours.

They ran one car in the 2011 FIA GT1 World Championship season with drivers Michaël Rossi, Jaime Camara, Dimitri Enjalbert and, for one round, Matteo Bobbi. They ran a black livery for most of the season but in round seven they ran with the same livery used by Exim Bank Team China.

==== Luc Alphand Aventures ====
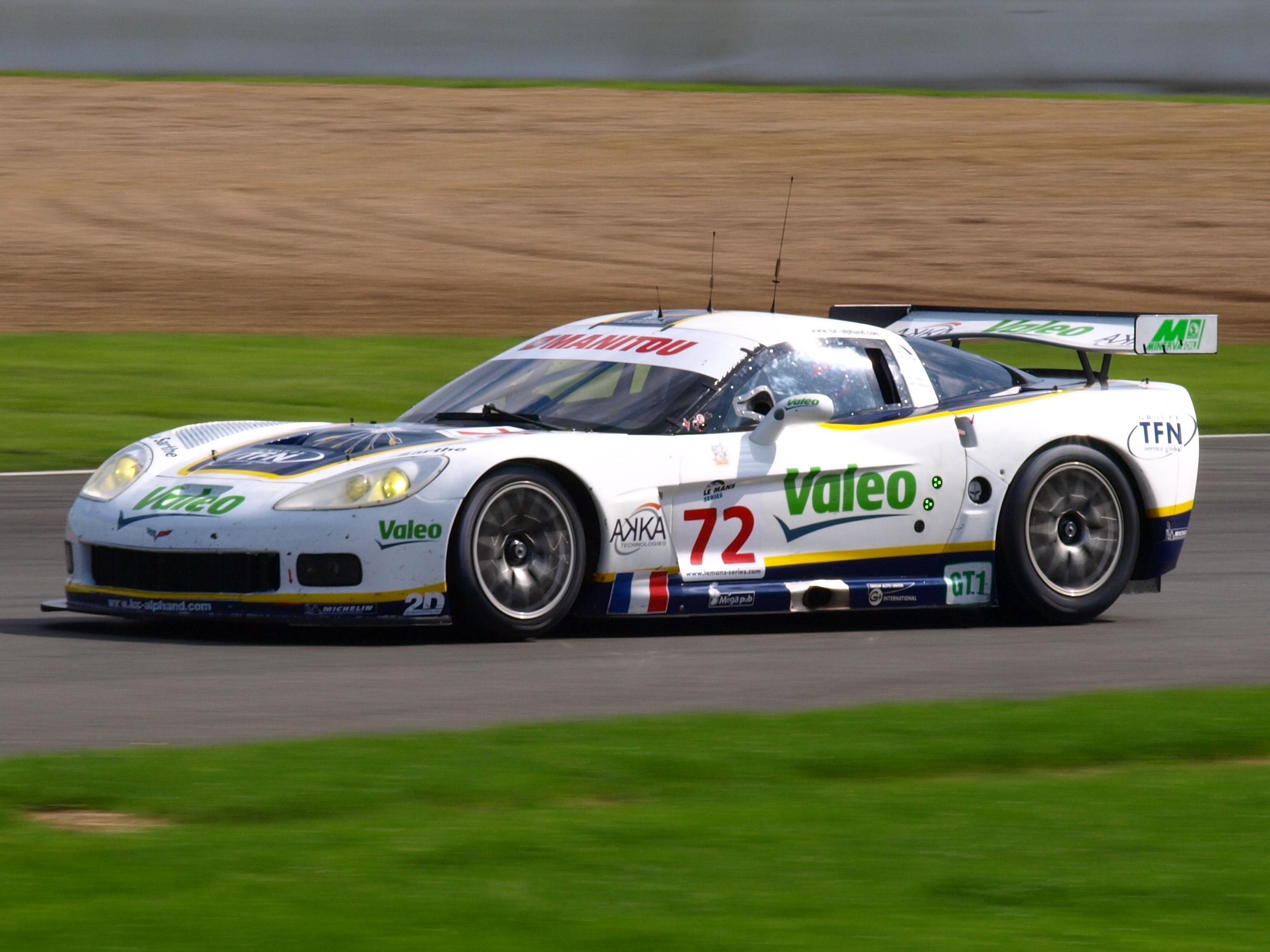
Luc Alphand's #72 C6.R, winner of the GT1 class Drivers and Teams Championships in the 2008 Le Mans Series season

Another team who had already purchased a C5-R, Luc Alphand's squad purchased a C6.R to run alongside their C5-R in the Le Mans Series as the team earned factory support from Pratt Miller for their European campaign. As part of Pratt Miller's support of Luc Alphand, Corvette Racing drivers Oliver Gavin and Olivier Beretta. 2007 saw the team briefly enter in the FIA GT at the Spa 24 Hours Oliver Gavin and Olivier Beretta. The team managed to finish in sixth place.

For the 2008 season, the team managed to beat Team Modena's Aston Martin to the Le Mans Series Team and Drivers Championship. Luc Alphand opted to split the teams 2 cars to race 1 in the FIA GT Championship and 1 the Le Mans Series.

==== Selleslagh Racing Team ====
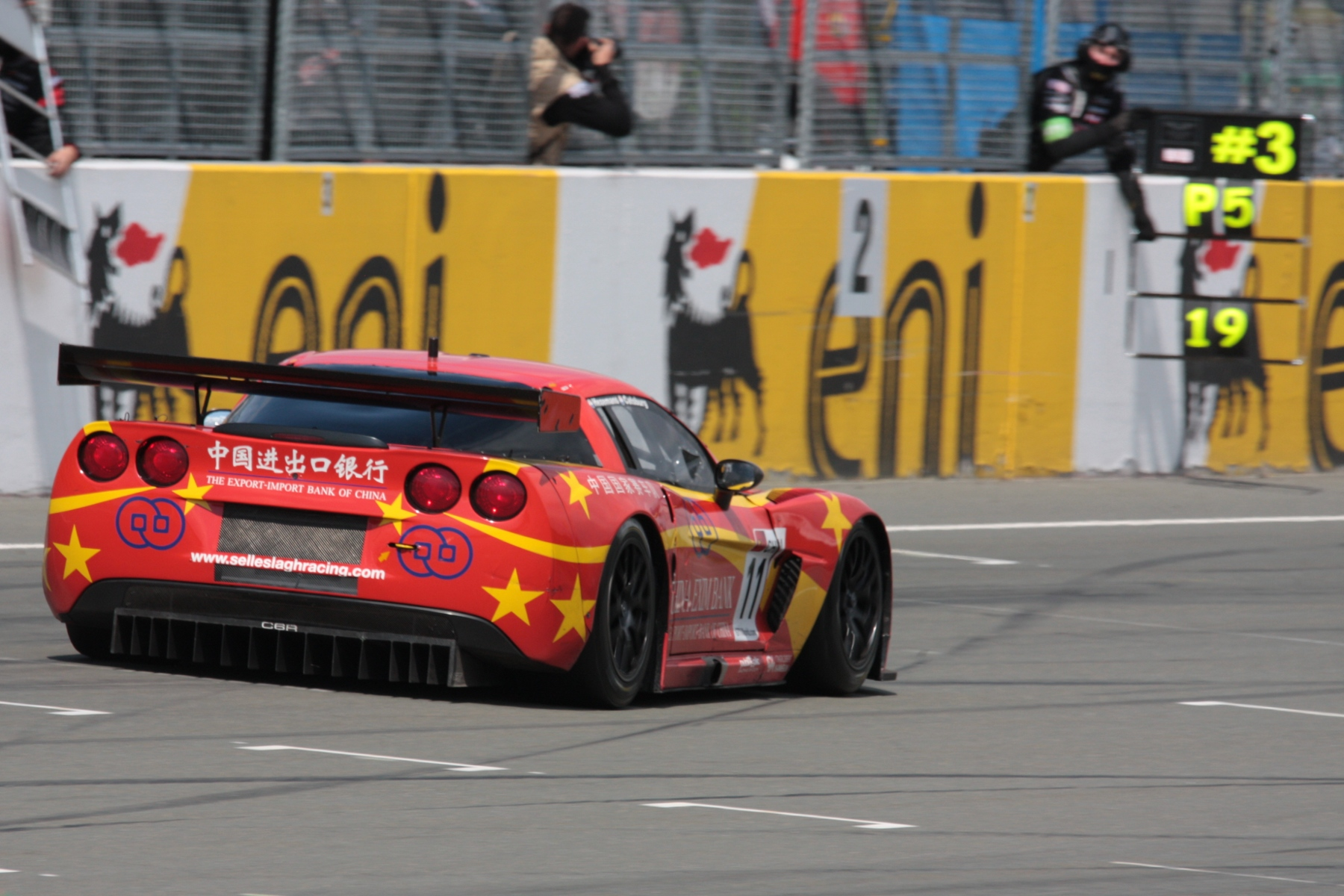
SRT C6.R under the Exim Bank Team China banner during the 2011 FIA GT1 World Championship season

Patrick Selleslagh became the very first customer Corvette team after purchasing a C5-R chassis in late 2001. SRT has gone on to win several Belcar Championships including 2005, with five victories, and also in 2006 where they scored another win in the Zolder 24 hours after victory in 2005.

The team's 2008 season consisted of entries in the FFSA French GT and the FIA GT Championship. Winning in Monza with Christophe Bouchut and Xavier Maassen, they scored their first ever win in the Championship. For the 2009 season, SRT campaigned their C6.R in both the FIA GT and FFSA French GT championships. Former PK driver Bert Longin was racing with the Belgian squad for the FIA GT alongside James Ruffier.

In the 2010 season, SRT competed in the FIA GT1 World Championship series under the flag of the Mad-Croc Racing.

In 2011 the SRT Corvette was entered under the Exim Bank Team China title, with drivers Mike Hezemans and Nick Catsburg. They had a pole and podium result (3rd place) in the silverstone race.

In 2014 SRT Corvette will be participating in the International GT Open with Maxime Soulet and Nicky Catsburg. In the BRCC they will be participating with Maxime Soulet, Maarten Makelberge and a third driver.

=== Race Victories ===
Year	No.	Event	Circuit	Series	Class	Entrant
2005	1	Sportsbook.com Grand Prix of Atlanta	(United States) Road Atlanta	ALMS	GT1	(United States) Corvette Racing
2005	2	American Le Mans at Mid-Ohio	(United States) Mid-Ohio Sports Car Course	ALMS	GT1	(United States) Corvette Racing
2005	3	24 Hours of Le Mans	(France) Circuit de la Sarthe	24LM	GT1	(United States) Corvette Racing
2005	4	New England Grand Prix	(United States) Lime Rock Park	ALMS	GT1	(United States) Corvette Racing
2005	5	Infineon Grand Prix of Sonoma	(United States) Infineon Raceway	ALMS	GT1	(United States) Corvette Racing
2005	6	Portland Grand Prix	(United States) Portland International Raceway	ALMS	GT1	(United States) Corvette Racing
2005	7	Generac 500 at Road America	(United States) Road America	ALMS	GT1	(United States) Corvette Racing
2005	8	Grand Prix of Mosport	(Canada) Mosport International Raceway	ALMS	GT1	(United States) Corvette Racing
2005	9	Petit Le Mans	(United States) Road Atlanta	ALMS	GT1	(United States) Corvette Racing
2005	10	Monterey Sports Car Championships	(United States) Mazda Raceway Laguna Seca	ALMS	GT1	(United States) Corvette Racing
2006	11	Mobil 1 12 Hours of Sebring	(United States) Sebring International Raceway	ALMS	GT1	(United States) Corvette Racing
2006	12	Lone Star Grand Prix	(United States) Reliant Park	ALMS	GT1	(United States) Corvette Racing
2006	13	American Le Mans at Mid-Ohio	(United States) Mid-Ohio Sports Car Course	ALMS	GT1	(United States) Corvette Racing
2006	14	24 Hours of Le Mans	(France) Circuit de la Sarthe	24LM	GT1	(United States) Corvette Racing
2006	15	Portland Grand Prix	(United States) Portland International Raceway	ALMS	GT1	(United States) Corvette Racing
2006	16	Paul Ricard Supercar 500	(France) Paul Ricard HTTT	FIA GT	GT1	(Belgium) GLPK-Carsport
2006	17	Generac 500 at Road America	(United States) Road America	ALMS	GT1	(United States) Corvette Racing
2007	18	Mobil 1 12 Hours of Sebring	(United States) Sebring International Raceway	ALMS	GT1	(United States) Corvette Racing
2007	19	Acura Sports Car Challenge of St. Petersburg	(United States) Streets of St. Petersburg	ALMS	GT1	(United States) Corvette Racing
2007	20	Toyota Grand Prix of Long Beach	(United States) Long Beach Street Circuit	ALMS	GT1	(United States) Corvette Racing
2007	21	1000km Monza	(Italy) Autodromo Nazionale di Monza	LMS	GT1	(France) Luc Alphand Aventures
2007	22	Lone Star Grand Prix	(United States) Reliant Park	ALMS	GT1	(United States) Corvette Racing
2007	23	Utah Grand Prix	(United States) Miller Motorsports Park	ALMS	GT1	(United States) Corvette Racing
2007	24	Northeast Grand Prix	(United States) Lime Rock Park	ALMS	GT1	(United States) Corvette Racing
2007	25	Acura Sports Car Challenge of Mid-Ohio	(United States) Mid-Ohio Sports Car Course	ALMS	GT1	(United States) Corvette Racing
2007	26	Total 24 Hours of Spa	(Belgium) Circuit de Spa-Francorchamps	FIA GT	GT1	(Netherlands) Carsport Holland
2007	27	Generac 500 at Road America	(United States) Road America	ALMS	GT1	(United States) Corvette Racing
2007	28	Mobil 1 presents Grand Prix of Mosport	(Canada) Mosport International Raceway	ALMS	GT1	(United States) Corvette Racing
2007	29	Detroit Sports Car Challenge	(United States) Belle Isle Street Circuit	ALMS	GT1	(United States) Corvette Racing
2007	30	Grand Prix de Nogaro	(France) Circuit Paul Armagnac	FIA GT	GT1	(Netherlands) Carsport Holland
2007	31	Petit Le Mans	(United States) Road Atlanta	ALMS	GT1	(United States) Corvette Racing
2007	32	Monterey Sports Car Championships	(United States) Mazda Raceway Laguna Seca	ALMS	GT1	(United States) Corvette Racing
2008	33	Mobil 1 12 Hours of Sebring	(United States) Sebring International Raceway	ALMS	GT1	(United States) Corvette Racing
2008	34	Acura Sports Car Challenge of St. Petersburg	(United States) Streets of St. Petersburg	ALMS	GT1	(United States) Corvette Racing
2008	35	1000 km of Catalunya	(Spain) Circuit de Catalunya	LMS	GT1	(France) Luc Alphand Aventures
2008	36	Tequila Patron American Le Mans Series at Long Beach	(United States) Long Beach Street Circuit	ALMS	GT1	(United States) Corvette Racing
2008	37	1000 km of Spa	(Belgium) Circuit de Spa-Francorchamps	LMS	GT1	(France) Luc Alphand Aventures
2008	38	Monza 2 Hours	(Italy) Autodromo Nazionale di Monza	FIA GT	GT1	(Belgium) Selleslagh Racing Team
2008	39	Larry H. Miller Dealerships Utah Grand Prix	(United States) Miller Motorsports Park	ALMS	GT1	(United States) Corvette Racing
2008	40	Adria 2 Hours	(Italy) Adria International Raceway	FIA GT	GT1	(Germany) Phoenix Carsport
2008	41	Northeast Grand Prix	(United States) Lime Rock Park	ALMS	GT1	(United States) Corvette Racing
2008	42	Acura Sports Car Challenge of Mid-Ohio	(United States) Mid-Ohio Sports Car Course	ALMS	GT1	(United States) Corvette Racing
2008	43	Generac 500 at Road America	(United States) Road America	ALMS	GT1	(United States) Corvette Racing
2008	44	Bucharest City Challenge Race 1	(Romania) Bucharest Ring	FIA GT	GT1	(Germany) Phoenix Carsport
2008	45	Bucharest City Challenge Race 2	(Romania) Bucharest Ring	FIA GT	GT1	(Germany) Phoenix Carsport
2008	46	Grand Prix of Mosport	(Canada) Mosport International Raceway	ALMS	GT1	(United States) Corvette Racing
2008	47	Detroit Sports Car Challenge	(United States) Belle Isle Street Circuit	ALMS	GT1	(United States) Corvette Racing
2008	48	Petit Le Mans	(United States) Road Atlanta	ALMS	GT1	(United States) Corvette Racing
2008	49	Monterey Sports Car Championships	(United States) Mazda Raceway Laguna Seca	ALMS	GT1	(United States) Corvette Racing
2009	50	1000 km of Spa	(Belgium) Circuit de Spa-Francorchamps	LMS	GT1	(France) Luc Alphand Aventures
2009	51	24 Hours of Le Mans	(France) Circuit de la Sarthe	24LM	GT1	(United States) Corvette Racing
2009	52	Oschersleben 2 Hours	(Germany) Motorsport Arena Oschersleben	FIA GT	GT1	(Belgium) PK Carsport
2009	53	24 Hours of Spa	(Belgium) Circuit de Spa-Francorchamps	FIA GT	GT1	(Belgium) PK Carsport
2009	54	1000 km of Algarve	(Portugal) Autodromo Internacional do Algarve	LMS	GT1	(France) Luc Alphand Aventures
2009	55	Grand Prix of Mosport	(Canada) Mosport International Raceway	ALMS	GT1	(United States) Corvette Racing
2009	56	Algarve 2 Hours	(Portugal) Autodromo Internacional do Algarve	FIA GT	GT1	(Belgium) Selleslagh Racing Team
2009	57	Paul Ricard 2 Hours	(France) Circuit Paul Ricard	FIA GT	GT1	Sangari Team Brazil
2010	58	FIA GT1 Abu Dhabi Qualifying Race	(United Arab Emirates) Yas Marina Circuit	FIA GT1	GT1	(Germany) Phoenix Racing / Carsport
2010	59	FIA GT1 Spa-Francorchamps Qualifying Race	(Belgium) Circuit de Spa-Francorchamps	FIA GT1	GT1	(Belgium) Mad-Croc Racing
2010	60	13th Annual Petit Le Mans	(United States) Road Atlanta	ALMS	GT	(United States) Corvette Racing
2011	61	24 Hours of Le Mans LMGTE Pro	(France) Circuit de la Sarthe	24LM	LM GTE Pro	(United States) Corvette Racing
2011	62	24 Hours of Le Mans LMGTE Am	(France) Circuit de la Sarthe	ILMC	LM GTE Am	(France) Larbre Competition
2011	63	6 Hours of Imola	(Italy) Autodromo Enzo e Dino Ferrari	ILMC	LM GTE Am	(France) Larbre Competition
2011	64	Grand Prix of Mosport	(Canada) Mosport International Raceway	ALMS	GT	(United States) Corvette Racing
2011	65	FIA GT1 San Luis Qualifying Race	(Argentina) Potrero de los Funes Circuit	FIA GT1	GT1	Exim Bank Team China
2011	66	FIA GT1 San Luis Championship Race	(Argentina) Potrero de los Funes Circuit	FIA GT1	GT1	Exim Bank Team China
2012	67	American Le Mans Series at Long Beach	(United States) Long Beach Street Circuit	ALMS	GT	(United States) Corvette Racing
2012	68	American Le Mans Monterey	(United States) Mazda Raceway Laguna Seca	ALMS	GT	(United States) Corvette Racing
2012	69	24 Hours of Le Mans	(France) Circuit de la Sarthe	WEC	LMGTE Am	(France) Larbre Competition
2012	70	Mid-Ohio Sports Car Challenge	(United States) Mid-Ohio Sports Car Course	ALMS	GT	(United States) Corvette Racing
2012	71	American Le Mans Series VIR 240	(United States) Virginia International Raceway	ALMS	GT	(United States) Corvette Racing
2012	72	6 Hours of Fuji	(Japan) Fuji Speedway	WEC	LMGTE Am	(France) Larbre Competition
2012	73	6 Hours of Shanghai	(China) Shanghai International Circuit	WEC	LMGTE Am	(France) Larbre Competition
2013	74	61st Mobil 1 12 Hours of Sebring	(United States) Sebring International Raceway	ALMS	GT	(United States) Corvette Racing
2013	75	American Le Mans Series Monterey	(United States) Mazda Raceway Laguna Seca	ALMS	GT	(United States) Corvette Racing
2013	76	Mobil 1 SportsCar Grand Prix	(Canada) Canadian Tire Motorsport Park	ALMS	GT	(United States) Corvette Racing
2013	77	Grand Prix of Baltimore	(United States) Baltimore Street Circuit	ALMS	GT	(United States) Corvette Racing
2013	78	International Sports Car Weekend	(United States) Circuit of the Americas	ALMS	GT	(United States) Corvette Racing

== Pratt Miller C6RS ==
The C6RS is a conversion of Corvette Z06 that resembles C6.R and shares components with the race car, produced by Pratt Miller. It uses Katech Performance 8.2L engine rated 600 horsepower and 600 lb-ft torque. The car has top speed of 202 mph. The production began in April 2008 with a planned run of 25 for the first year; however, only 7 Corvette C6RS were ever built.

A version running E85 ethanol was created with Jay Leno, appeared in 2007 SEMA show. Convertible version was unveiled in 2008 12 Hours of Sebring.

== Corvette C6.R GT2 ==
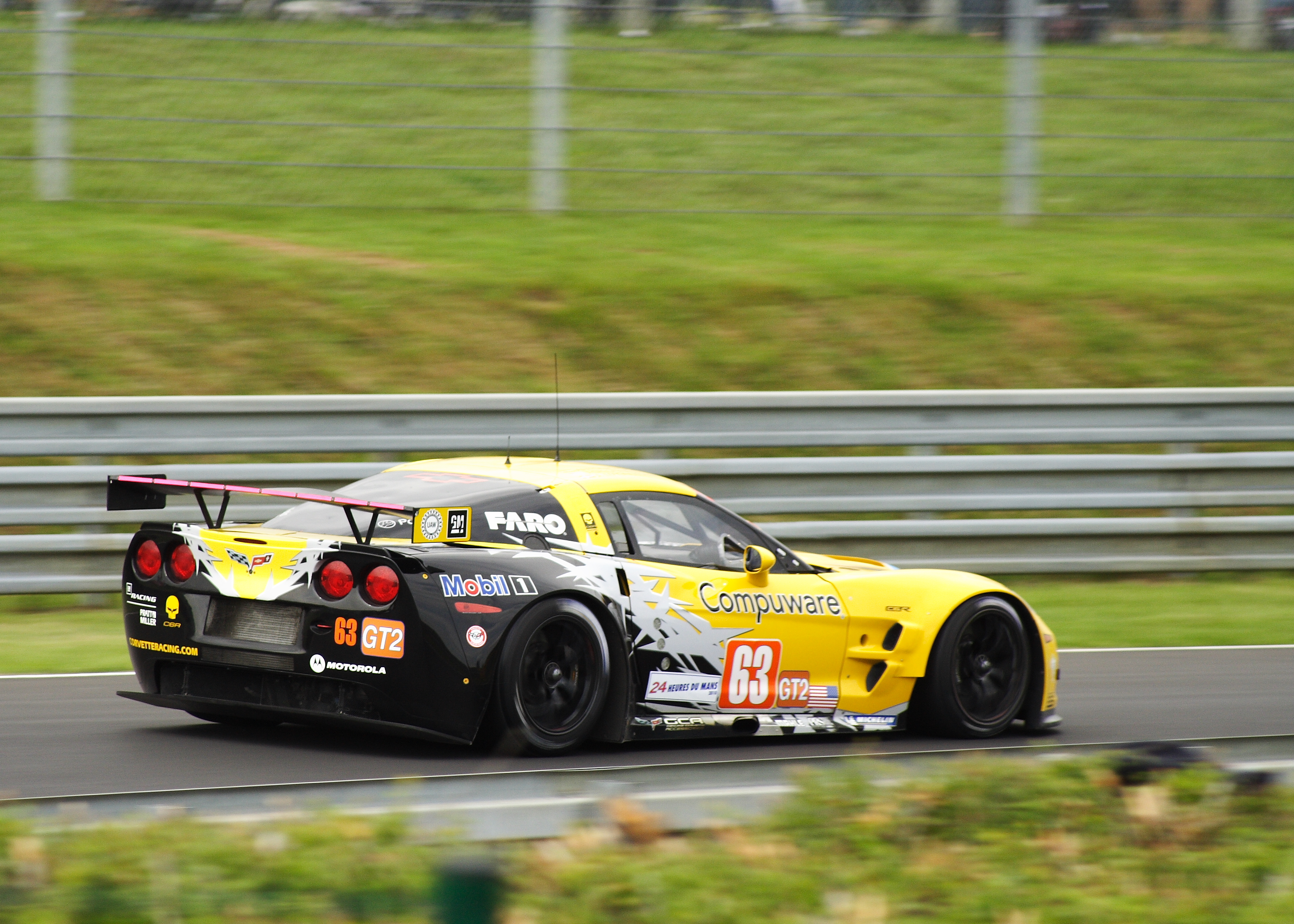
The #63 Corvette Racing-entered Corvette of Johnny O'Connell, Jan Magnussen and Antonio García that competed at the 2010 24 Hours of Le Mans.

On September 9, 2008, Corvette Racing GM Road Racing Group manager Steve Wesoloski and Corvette Racing program manager Doug Fehan announced that for the 2009 ALMS season they would be running the C6.R in the GT1 class for only the first half of the season. After the 24 hours of Le Mans, Corvette Racing ran a newly designed C6.R in the GT2 class in preparation for the 2010 season's GT class regulations.

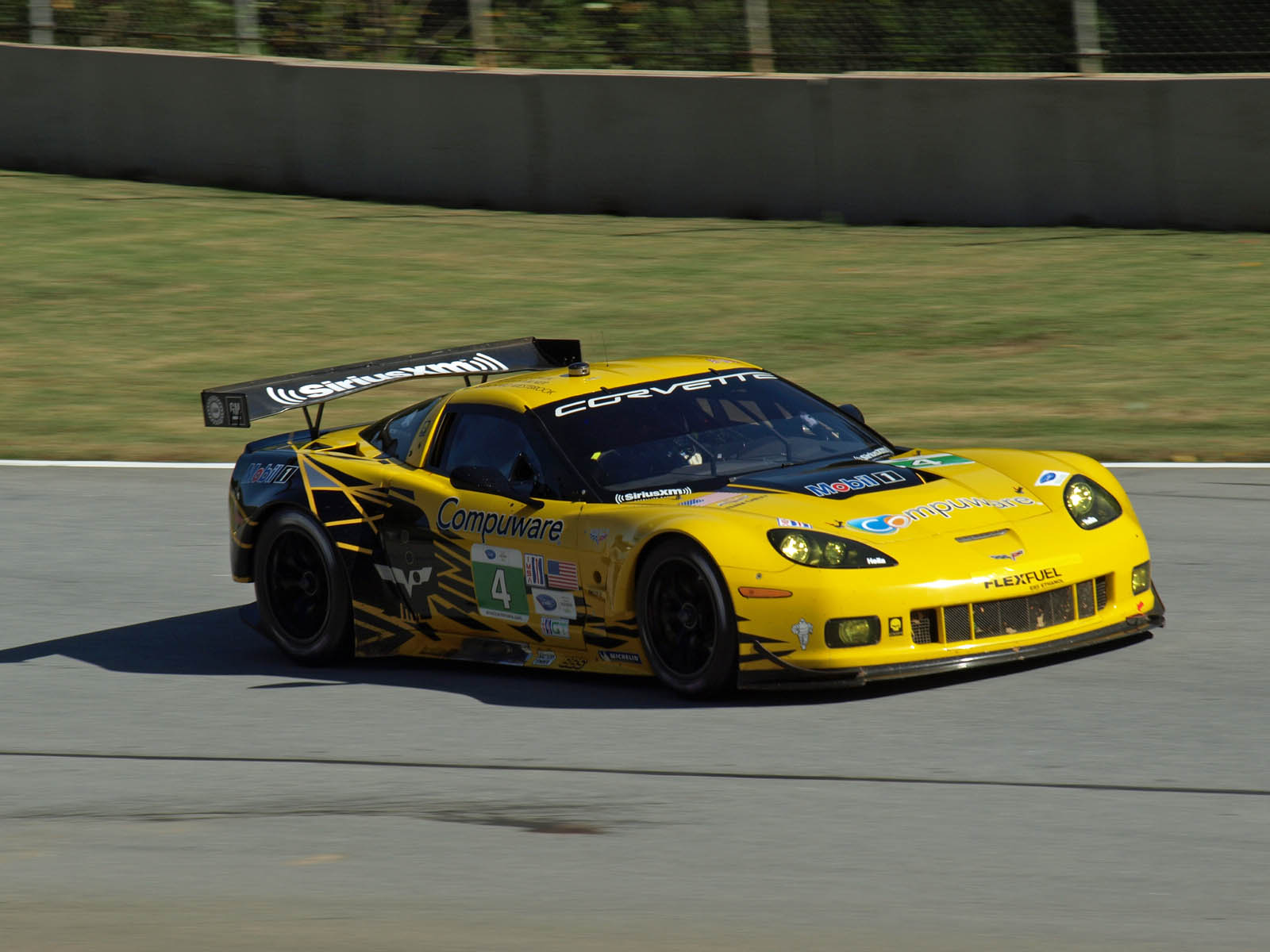
Chevrolet Corvette C6.R GT2

The car uses a newly designed 6.0L V8 making 470 bhp, which is based on the 7.0L LS7.R from the GT1 car (which produced 590 bhp). As part of the GT regulations for 2010, the engine would be downsized to 5.5L to comply with the new engine displacement limits. The new GT2 car takes body styling cues from the then new Corvette ZR1 street car. The car sports a new aluminum frame (the GT1 car had a steel frame), smaller front splitter and rear wing, and steel brakes (the GT1 used carbon ceramic brakes), bringing it closer to the build of the Z06 road car. Due to its 5.5L motor displacement, the car was penalized with extra weight and waivers, much to the advantage of the competing Ferrari F430 GTC, whose powerplant generated the same 500 bhp but from a 4.0L V8.

The new GT2 car began its campaign in the GT2 class starting with the 2009 Mid-Ohio race. Despite competing in a new class with a new car the #3 car of Jan Magnussen and Johnny O'Connell took 2nd in their first race and won their third race at Mosport after a long battle with the Risi Competizione Ferrari F430 GT.

At 2010 24 Hours of Le Mans, factory GT2 Corvettes retired after engine problems and a collision with Anthony Davidson's Peugeot. Only one of four entered Corvettes - GT1 C6R of Luc Alphand Aventures - eventually finished the race, taking second place in class. This was the final year of GT1 in ACO racing. The Corvette was clocked at 182 mph down the Mulsanne Straight, which was the fastest GT car (GT1 and GT2).

For the 2011 season, the Corvette saw several performance upgrades, most notably the addition of a paddle-shift transmission. This particular car has won the 2011 24 Hours of Le Mans in the GTE-Pro category.

In 2012, the C6.R took advantage of new regulations to grow 50mm wider at the wheelwells. This reportedly makes the car more stable and increases mechanical grip. Corvette Racing scored a 2nd-place finish at the 2012 12 Hours of Sebring and won the 2012 American Le Mans Series at Long Beach, the first win for Corvette since Mosport in 2011. At the 2012 24 Hours of Le Mans, the #74 took an early lead of the race from the Aston Martin V8 Vantage GTE; however, a wheel fell off due to a missing wheel nut during the night which resulted in significant damage to the gearbox and other components. The #74 eventually finished unclassified due to not meeting the minimum percentage of the class winner. The #73 suffered tire issues and later had a broken steering rack which delayed the team for about an hour; the car finished 5th in class. Corvette Racing won the 2012 GT Team's and Driver's championship with 4 class wins.

In 2013, Corvette Racing repeated its success and won the 2013 ALMS GT championships with 5 GT victories, including the 12 Hours of Sebring.

=== Privateer teams ===
V8 racing, Selleslagh Racing Team

==== Larbre Competition ====
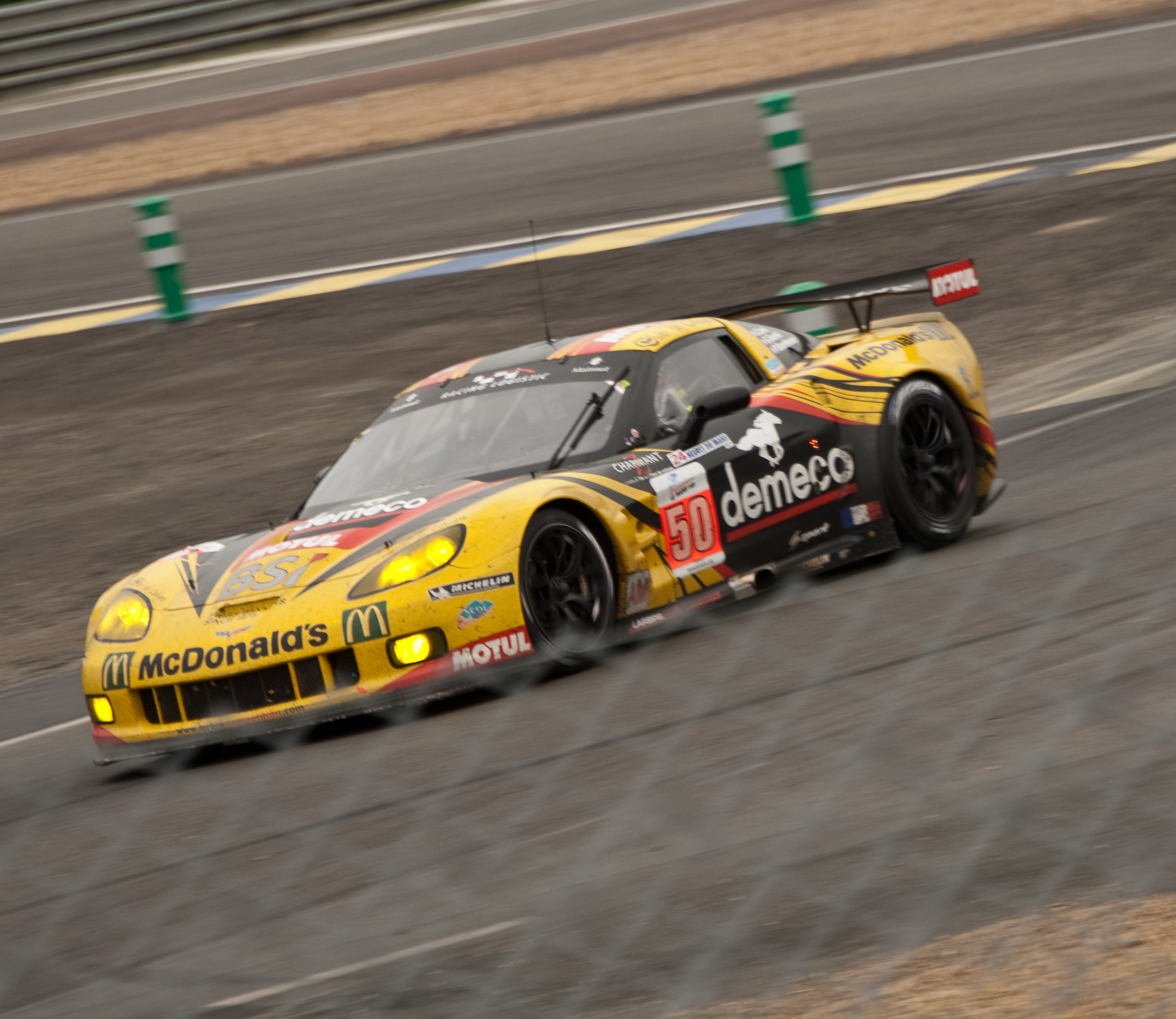
Larbre's GTE-Am class-winning Corvette C6.R at the 2011 24 Hours of Le Mans.

The first team to run a privateer Corvette C6.R GT2 car was the French-based Larbre Competition. In their first race with the car, they finished with a DNF at the 2011 12 Hours of Sebring, but would later come back to win the GTE-Am class of the 2011 24 Hours of Le Mans. They would also go on to win the GTE-Am class championship of the 2011 Intercontinental Le Mans Cup. For 2012, they are running in the FIA World Endurance Championship in the GTE-Am class again with two C6.R Corvettes. They repeated their Le Mans success by winning the 2012 24 Hours of Le Mans in the GTE-Am class for a second year in a row after car No. 50 driven by ex-Peugeot Sport driver Pedro Lamy took the lead with less than an hour to go from the No. 67 IMSA Performance Matmut Porsche 997 GT3-RSR driven at the time by Anthony Pons. The Larbre Corvette, at 1260 kg, finished 20th overall ahead of the sole remaining factory Corvette. Car No. 70 finished fifth in class.

=== In fiction ===
Jeff Gorvette, a character from the 2011 Pixar film, Cars 2, is based on this car, and was voiced by its namesake NASCAR driver Jeff Gordon.
