= 2002 FIA GT Jarama 500km =

Championship racing

Layout of the Jarama circuit

The 2002 FIA GT Jarama 500 km was the fourth round the 2002 FIA GT Championship season. It took place at the Circuito Permanente Del Jarama, Spain, on 2 June 2002.

== Official results ==
Class winners in bold. Cars failing to complete 70% of winner's distance marked as Not Classified (NC).

| Pos | Class | No | Team | Drivers | Chassis | Tyre | Laps |
| Pos | Class | No | Team | Drivers | Engine | Tyre | Laps |
|---|---|---|---|---|---|---|---|
| 1 | **GT** | **23** | **(Italy) BMS Scuderia Italia** | **(Italy) Andrea Piccini (Switzerland) Jean-Denis Délétraz** | **Ferrari 550-GTS Maranello** | **MI** | **112** |
| 1 | **GT** | **23** | **(Italy) BMS Scuderia Italia** | **(Italy) Andrea Piccini (Switzerland) Jean-Denis Délétraz** | **Ferrari 5.9L V12** | **MI** | **112** |
| 2 | GT | 3 | (Netherlands) Team Carsport Holland (Italy) Racing Box | (Netherlands) Mike Hezemans (Belgium) Anthony Kumpen | Chrysler Viper GTS-R | **P** | 112 |
| 2 | GT | 3 | (Netherlands) Team Carsport Holland (Italy) Racing Box | (Netherlands) Mike Hezemans (Belgium) Anthony Kumpen | Chrysler 8.0L V10 | **P** | 112 |
| 3 | GT | 1 | (France) Larbre Compétition Chereau | (France) Christophe Bouchut (France) David Terrien | Chrysler Viper GTS-R | **MI** | 112 |
| 3 | GT | 1 | (France) Larbre Compétition Chereau | (France) Christophe Bouchut (France) David Terrien | Chrysler 8.0L V10 | **MI** | 112 |
| 4 | GT | 2 | (France) Larbre Compétition Chereau | (Belgium) Vincent Vosse (Sweden) Carl Rosenblad | Chrysler Viper GTS-R | **MI** | 111 |
| 4 | GT | 2 | (France) Larbre Compétition Chereau | (Belgium) Vincent Vosse (Sweden) Carl Rosenblad | Chrysler 8.0L V10 | **MI** | 111 |
| 5 | GT | 11 | (France) Paul Belmondo Racing | (France) Paul Belmondo (France) Claude-Yves Gosselin | Chrysler Viper GTS-R | **P** | 110 |
| 5 | GT | 11 | (France) Paul Belmondo Racing | (France) Paul Belmondo (France) Claude-Yves Gosselin | Chrysler 8.0L V10 | **P** | 110 |
| 6 | GT | 14 | (United Kingdom) Lister Storm Racing | (United Kingdom) Jamie Campbell-Walter (Germany) Nicolaus Springer | Lister Storm | **D** | 110 |
| 6 | GT | 14 | (United Kingdom) Lister Storm Racing | (United Kingdom) Jamie Campbell-Walter (Germany) Nicolaus Springer | Jaguar 7.0L V12 | **D** | 110 |
| 7 | GT | 25 | (Belgium) PSI Motorsport | (Belgium) Kurt Mollekens (Finland) Markus Palttala | Porsche 911 Bi-Turbo | **D** | 109 |
| 7 | GT | 25 | (Belgium) PSI Motorsport | (Belgium) Kurt Mollekens (Finland) Markus Palttala | Porsche 3.6L Turbo Flat-6 | **D** | 109 |
| 8 | GT | 9 | (France) Team A.R.T. | (France) Jean-Pierre Jarier (France) François Lafon | Chrysler Viper GTS-R | **P** | 109 |
| 8 | GT | 9 | (France) Team A.R.T. | (France) Jean-Pierre Jarier (France) François Lafon | Chrysler 8.0L V10 | **P** | 109 |
| 9 | **N-GT** | **54** | **(Germany) Freisinger Motorsport** | **(Germany) Sascha Maassen (Monaco) Stéphane Ortelli** | **Porsche 911 GT3-RS** | **D** | **108** |
| 9 | **N-GT** | **54** | **(Germany) Freisinger Motorsport** | **(Germany) Sascha Maassen (Monaco) Stéphane Ortelli** | **Porsche 3.6L Flat-6** | **D** | **108** |
| 10 | N-GT | 50 | (France) JMB Racing | (Italy) Christian Pescatori (Italy) Andrea Montermini | Ferrari 360 Modena N-GT | **P** | 107 |
| 10 | N-GT | 50 | (France) JMB Racing | (Italy) Christian Pescatori (Italy) Andrea Montermini | Ferrari 3.6L V8 | **P** | 107 |
| 11 | N-GT | 76 | (Germany) RWS Motorsport | (Germany) Hans Fertl (Spain) Antonio García | Porsche 911 GT3-R | **P** | 107 |
| 11 | N-GT | 76 | (Germany) RWS Motorsport | (Germany) Hans Fertl (Spain) Antonio García | Porsche 3.6L Flat-6 | **P** | 107 |
| 12 | N-GT | 51 | (France) JMB Racing | (Italy) Andrea Bertolini (Italy) Andrea Garbagnati | Ferrari 360 Modena N-GT | **P** | 107 |
| 12 | N-GT | 51 | (France) JMB Racing | (Italy) Andrea Bertolini (Italy) Andrea Garbagnati | Ferrari 3.6L V8 | **P** | 107 |
| 13 | N-GT | 55 | (Germany) Freisinger Motorsport | (France) Stéphane Daoudi (Belgium) Bert Longin | Porsche 911 GT3-RS | **D** | 106 |
| 13 | N-GT | 55 | (Germany) Freisinger Motorsport | (France) Stéphane Daoudi (Belgium) Bert Longin | Porsche 3.6L Flat-6 | **D** | 106 |
| 14 | N-GT | 60 | (Germany) JVG Racing | (Germany) Jürgen von Gartzen (United Kingdom) Ian Khan | Porsche 911 GT3-RS | **P** | 106 |
| 14 | N-GT | 60 | (Germany) JVG Racing | (Germany) Jürgen von Gartzen (United Kingdom) Ian Khan | Porsche 3.6L Flat-6 | **P** | 106 |
| 15 | GT | 17 | (Germany) Proton Competition | (Austria) Horst Felbermayr, Sr. (Austria) Horst Felbermayr, Jr. | Porsche 911 GT2 | **Y** | 104 |
| 15 | GT | 17 | (Germany) Proton Competition | (Austria) Horst Felbermayr, Sr. (Austria) Horst Felbermayr, Jr. | Porsche 3.6L Turbo Flat-6 | **Y** | 104 |
| 16 | N-GT | 58 | (Italy) Autorlando Sport | (Austria) Philipp Peter (Austria) Toto Wolff | Porsche 911 GT3-RS | **P** | 103 |
| 16 | N-GT | 58 | (Italy) Autorlando Sport | (Austria) Philipp Peter (Austria) Toto Wolff | Porsche 3.6L Flat-6 | **P** | 103 |
| 17 | N-GT | 59 | (Italy) Autorlando Sport | (Italy) Luca Rangoni (Switzerland) Joël Camathias | Porsche 911 GT3-RS | **P** | 103 |
| 17 | N-GT | 59 | (Italy) Autorlando Sport | (Italy) Luca Rangoni (Switzerland) Joël Camathias | Porsche 3.6L Flat-6 | **P** | 103 |
| 18 | GT | 16 | (Germany) Proton Competition | (Germany) Gerold Ried (Germany) Christian Ried | Porsche 911 GT2 | **Y** | 103 |
| 18 | GT | 16 | (Germany) Proton Competition | (Germany) Gerold Ried (Germany) Christian Ried | Porsche 3.6L Turbo Flat-6 | **Y** | 103 |
| 19 | N-GT | 70 | (Italy) MAC Racing (Italy) Scuderia Veregra | (Italy) Mauro Casadei (Italy) Moreno Soli | Porsche 911 GT3-RS | **D** | 99 |
| 19 | N-GT | 70 | (Italy) MAC Racing (Italy) Scuderia Veregra | (Italy) Mauro Casadei (Italy) Moreno Soli | Porsche 3.6L Flat-6 | **D** | 99 |
| 20 | N-GT | 63 | (Netherlands) System Force Motorsport | (Netherlands) Phil Bastiaans (Netherlands) Peter Van Merksteijn | Porsche 911 GT3-RS | **P** | 91 |
| 20 | N-GT | 63 | (Netherlands) System Force Motorsport | (Netherlands) Phil Bastiaans (Netherlands) Peter Van Merksteijn | Porsche 3.6L Flat-6 | **P** | 91 |
| 21 | N-GT | 64 | (United Kingdom) Cirtek Motorsport | (United Kingdom) Tim Lawrence (Germany) Klaus Horn (France) Marco Saviozzi | Porsche 911 GT3-R | **D** | 88 |
| 21 | N-GT | 64 | (United Kingdom) Cirtek Motorsport | (United Kingdom) Tim Lawrence (Germany) Klaus Horn (France) Marco Saviozzi | Porsche 3.6L Flat-6 | **D** | 88 |
| 22 | GT | 12 | (France) Paul Belmondo Racing | (Italy) Fabio Babini (Belgium) Marc Duez | Chrysler Viper GTS-R | **P** | 80 |
| 22 | GT | 12 | (France) Paul Belmondo Racing | (Italy) Fabio Babini (Belgium) Marc Duez | Chrysler 8.0L V10 | **P** | 80 |
| 23 | N-GT | 53 | (France) JMB Competition | (Italy) Marco Lambertini (Italy) Batti Pregliasco (Switzerland) Iradj Alexander | Ferrari 360 Modena N-GT | **P** | 80 |
| 23 | N-GT | 53 | (France) JMB Competition | (Italy) Marco Lambertini (Italy) Batti Pregliasco (Switzerland) Iradj Alexander | Ferrari 3.6L V8 | **P** | 80 |
| 24 DNF | N-GT | 62 | (United Kingdom) Cirtek Motorsport | (France) Jean-Marc Gounon (Italy) Raffaele Sangiuolo | Porsche 911 GT3-RS | **D** | 64 |
| 24 DNF | N-GT | 62 | (United Kingdom) Cirtek Motorsport | (France) Jean-Marc Gounon (Italy) Raffaele Sangiuolo | Porsche 3.6L Flat-6 | **D** | 64 |
| 25 DNF | GT | 4 | (Netherlands) Team Carsport Holland (Italy) Racing Box | (Italy) Fabrizio Gollin (Italy) Luca Cappellari | Chrysler Viper GTS-R | **P** | 59 |
| 25 DNF | GT | 4 | (Netherlands) Team Carsport Holland (Italy) Racing Box | (Italy) Fabrizio Gollin (Italy) Luca Cappellari | Chrysler 8.0L V10 | **P** | 59 |
| 26 DNF | GT | 22 | (Italy) BMS Scuderia Italia | (Switzerland) Enzo Calderari (Switzerland) Lilian Bryner (Switzerland) Frédéric Dor | Ferrari 550-GTS Maranello | **MI** | 54 |
| 26 DNF | GT | 22 | (Italy) BMS Scuderia Italia | (Switzerland) Enzo Calderari (Switzerland) Lilian Bryner (Switzerland) Frédéric Dor | Ferrari 5.9L V12 | **MI** | 54 |
| 27 DNF | N-GT | 77 | (Germany) RWS Motorsport | (Russia) Alexey Vasilyev (Russia) Nikolai Fomenko | Porsche 911 GT3-R | **P** | 38 |
| 27 DNF | N-GT | 77 | (Germany) RWS Motorsport | (Russia) Alexey Vasilyev (Russia) Nikolai Fomenko | Porsche 3.6L Flat-6 | **P** | 38 |
| 28 DNF | GT | 15 | (United Kingdom) Lister Storm Racing | (United Kingdom) Bobby Verdon-Roe (United Kingdom) Paul Knapfield | Lister Storm | **D** | 32 |
| 28 DNF | GT | 15 | (United Kingdom) Lister Storm Racing | (United Kingdom) Bobby Verdon-Roe (United Kingdom) Paul Knapfield | Jaguar 7.0L V12 | **D** | 32 |
| 29 DNF | N-GT | 66 | (Italy) MAC Racing (Italy) Scuderia Veregra | (Italy) Francesco Merendino (Italy) Michele Merendino | Porsche 911 GT3-R | **D** | 20 |
| 29 DNF | N-GT | 66 | (Italy) MAC Racing (Italy) Scuderia Veregra | (Italy) Francesco Merendino (Italy) Michele Merendino | Porsche 3.6L Flat-6 | **D** | 20 |
| 30 DNF | GT | 5 | (France) Force One Racing | (France) David Hallyday (France) Philippe Alliot | Ferrari 550 Maranello | **MI** | 11 |
| 30 DNF | GT | 5 | (France) Force One Racing | (France) David Hallyday (France) Philippe Alliot | Ferrari 6.0L V12 | **MI** | 11 |
| 31 DNF | GT | 27 | (France) DDO | (France) Dominique Dupuy (France) Miguel Barbany | Chrysler Viper GTS-R | ? | 9 |
| 31 DNF | GT | 27 | (France) DDO | (France) Dominique Dupuy (France) Miguel Barbany | Chrysler 8.0L V10 | ? | 9 |
| 32 DNF | N-GT | 52 | (France) JMB Competition | (Italy) Pietro Gianni (Italy) Gianluca Giraudi | Ferrari 360 Modena N-GT | **P** | 9 |
| 32 DNF | N-GT | 52 | (France) JMB Competition | (Italy) Pietro Gianni (Italy) Gianluca Giraudi | Ferrari 3.6L V8 | **P** | 9 |

== Statistics ==
- Pole position – #23 BMS Scuderia Italia – 1:31.000
- Fastest lap – #23 BMS Scuderia Italia – 1:32.404
- Average speed – 143.010 km/h

FIA GT Championship
| Previous race: 2002 FIA GT Brno 500km | 2002 season | Next race: 2002 FIA GT Anderstorp 500km |
