= 2012 24 Hours of Le Mans =

80th 24 Hours of Le Mans endurance race

Previous: 2011	Next: 2013
Index: Races | Winners

Circuit de la Sarthe track

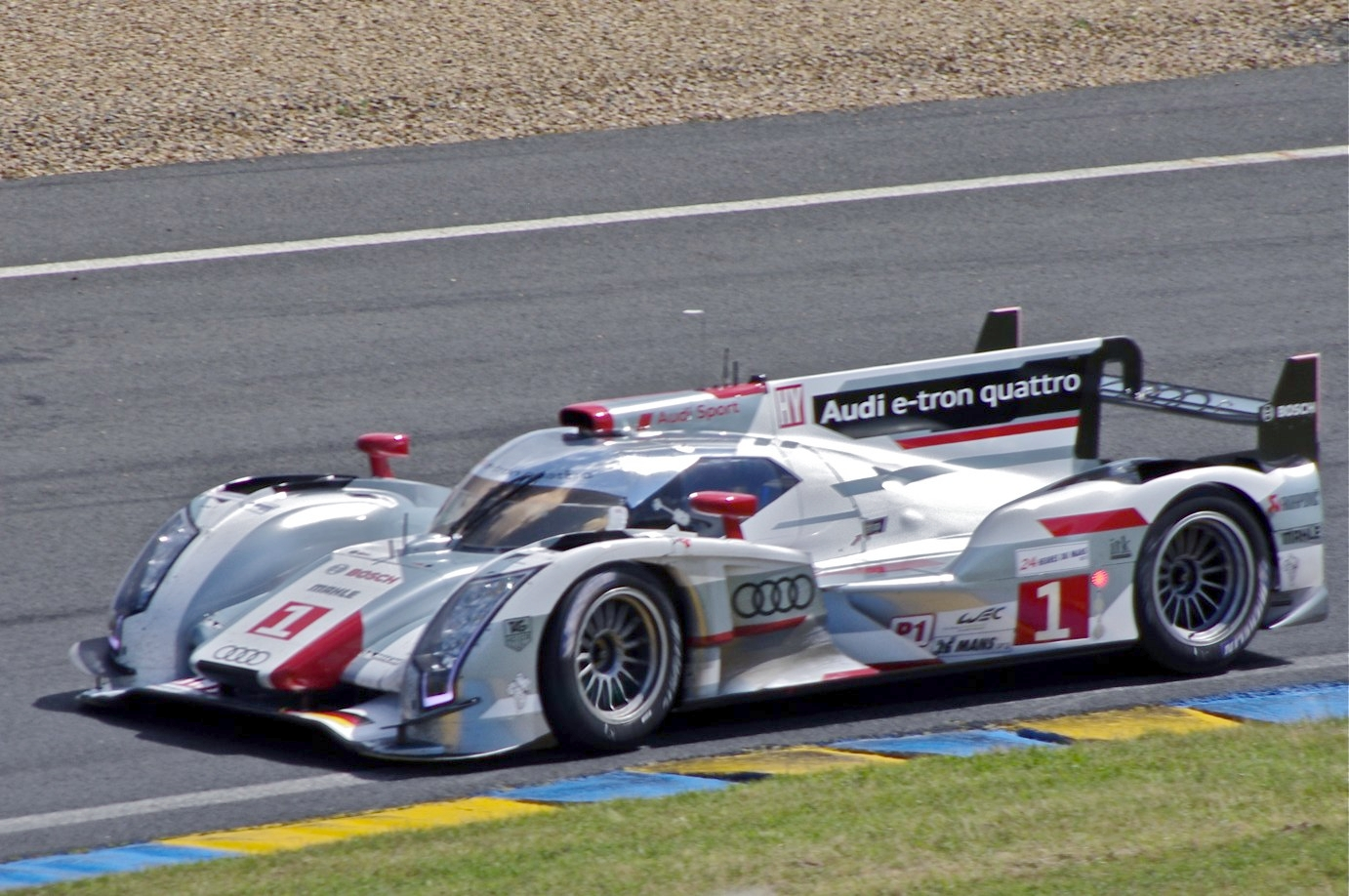
The race winning No. 1 Audi R18 e-tron quattro, driven by Marcel Fässler, Benoît Tréluyer and André Lotterer.

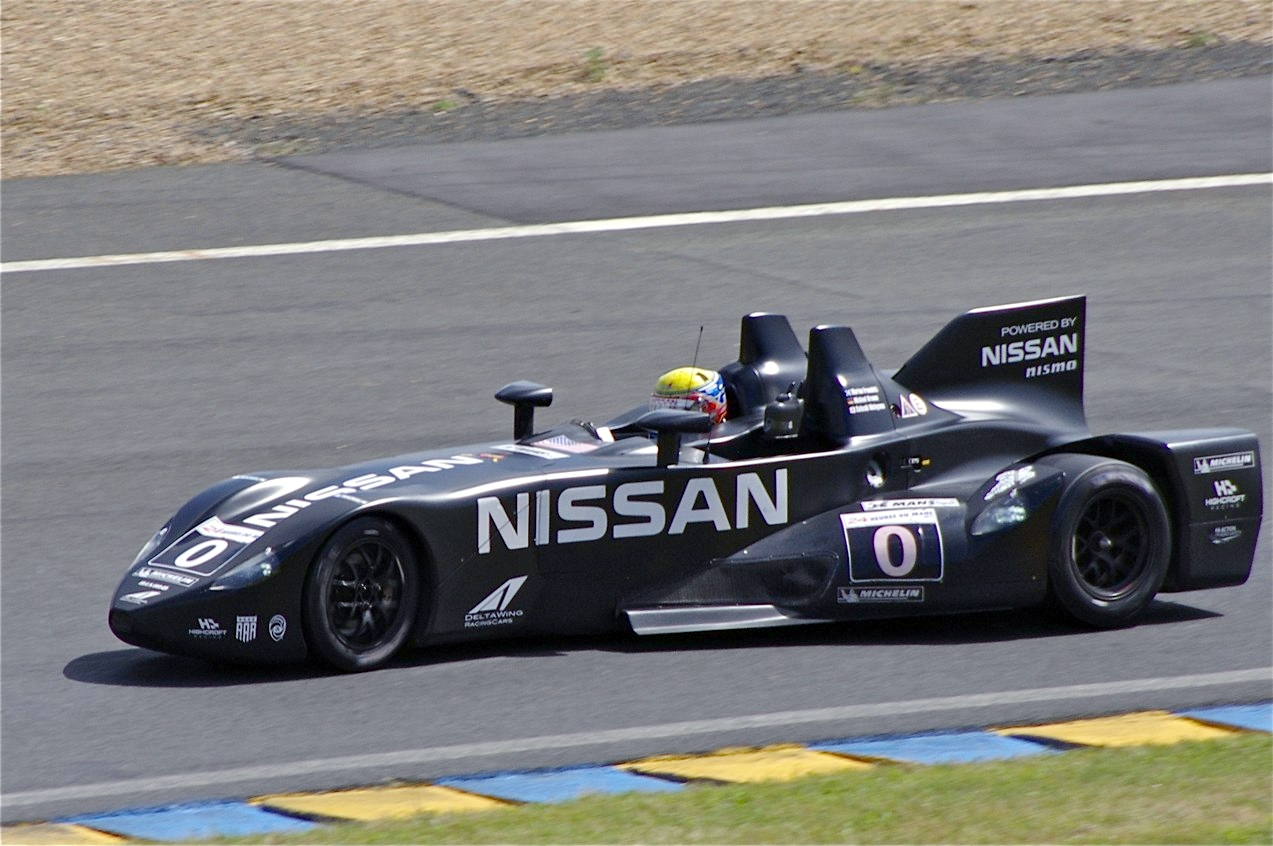
Highcroft Racing No. 0 Nissan Deltawing, First Garage 56 entry of the 2012 24 Hours of Le Mans

The 80th 24 Hours of Le Mans (French: 80^{e} 24 Heures du Mans) was a 24-hour automobile endurance race for teams of three drivers each entering Le Mans Prototype and Le Mans Grand Touring Endurance cars held from 16 to 17 June 2012 at the Circuit de la Sarthe close to Le Mans, France before 240,000 spectators. It was the 80th running of the event, as organised by the automotive group, the Automobile Club de l'Ouest (ACO) since 1923. The race was the third round of the 2012 FIA World Endurance Championship, with 30 of the race's 56 entries contesting the championship. A test day was held two weeks prior to the race on 3 June.

A Audi R18 e-tron quattro driven by André Lotterer, Marcel Fässler and Benoît Tréluyer started from pole position after Lotterer set the fastest overall lap time in the third qualifying session. The team were untroubled in the opening hours of the race until a Toyota TS030 Hybrid shared by Alexander Wurz, Kazuki Nakajima and Nicolas Lapierre took the lead. Toyota relinquished it during a safety car period for a major accident at the start of the sixth hour. Audi's other team of Allan McNish, Tom Kristensen and Rinaldo Capello became their teammate's lead challengers until McNish crashed while lapping slower traffic in the 22nd hour and providing Lotterer, Fässler and Tréluyer with a lead they maintained to the end of the race. It was Lotterer, Fässler and Tréluyer's second Le Mans win, Audi's eleventh and the first for a hybrid electric vehicle. The second Audi finished one lap behind in second place and a R18 ultra of Oliver Jarvis, Marco Bonanomi and Mike Rockenfeller completed an Audi sweep of the podium positions in third.

The Le Mans Prototype 2 (LMP2) class was won by the Starworks Motorsport team of Enzo Potolicchio, Ryan Dalziel and Tom Kimber-Smith in a HPD ARX-03b after they led the final 215 laps of the event. The trio finished ahead of Thiriet by TDS Racing's Oreca 03 car shared by Pierre Thiriet, Mathias Beche and Christophe Tinseau and PeCom Racing's Luis Pérez Companc, Pierre Kaffer and Soheil Ayari. Giancarlo Fisichella, Gianmaria Bruni and Toni Vilander in an AF Corse Ferrari 458 Italia GT2 held a three-lap lead in Le Mans Grand Touring Professional (LMGTE Pro) over Luxury Racing's trio of Frédéric Makowiecki, Jaime Melo and Dominik Farnbacher. The Le Mans Grand Touring Amateur (LMGTE Am) category was won by Larbre Compétition's Chevrolet Corvette C6.R of Patrick Bornhauser, Pedro Lamy and Julien Canal after Lamy overtook Anthony Pons, Nicolas Armindo and Raymond Narac's IMSA Performance Matmut Porsche 997 GT3-RSR in the final hour.

Due to the result of the race, McNish, Kristensen and Capello were elevated to the lead of the Drivers' Championship, 6½ points over the race winners Lotterer, Fässler and Tréluyer in second position. The leaders entering the event, Romain Dumas and Loïc Duval fell to third. Marc Gené was in fourth place and the Rebellion trio of Nick Heidfeld, Neel Jani and Nico Prost completed the top five after finishing in fourth position. Audi continued to lead the non-scoring Toyota in the Manufacturers' Championship with five races left in the season.

== Background ==
The 24 Hours of Le Mans was first held in 1923 after the automotive journalist Charles Faroux, the Automobile Club de l'Ouest (ACO) general secretary Georges Durand and the industrialist Emile Coquile agreed to hold a test of vehicle reliability and durability. The 24 Hours of Le Mans is considered one of the world's most prestigious motor races and is part of the Triple Crown of Motorsport.

The ACO moved the 2012 Le Mans schedule forward by one week in order to avoid a date conflict with races in the 2012 Formula One World Championship and to allow teams to establish their facilities at the Circuit de la Sarthe close to Le Mans, France. It was the 80th annual edition of the event, as well as the third of eight automobile endurance races of the 2012 FIA World Endurance Championship (WEC).

After the preceding 6 Hours of Spa-Francorchamps, Audi drivers Romain Dumas and Loïc Duval led the Drivers' Championship with 43 points, two ahead of their teammates Rinaldo Capello, Tom Kristensen and Allan McNish in second place. Marc Gené was in third position with 25 points, the trio of Marcel Fässler, André Lotterer and Benoît Tréluyer were in fourth place with 19 1/2 points and Timo Bernhard was fifth with 18 points. Audi led the non-scoring Toyota in the Manufacturers' Championship by 52 points.

== Regulation changes ==
With the introduction of hybrid electric vehicles for the first time at the 24 Hours of Le Mans in 2012, the ACO and the world governing body of motor racing, the Fédération Internationale de l'Automobile (FIA), created seven zones on the Circuit de la Sarthe for those cars to recuperate electrical energy under braking. Each zone was situated 50 m (160 ft) before the entry to a corner. The ACO and the FIA imposed a mandatory limit of 500 kJ (140 Wh) to restrict the amount of energy capable of being harvested by an energy recovery system between two braking zones and to regulate the capital needed to develop such systems.

== Entries ==
=== Automatic entries ===
Automatic entries were earned by teams which won their class in the 2011 24 Hours of Le Mans. Teams who won Le Mans-based series and events such as the American Le Mans Series (ALMS), Le Mans Series (LMS), and the Petit Le Mans were also invited. Some second-place finishers were also granted automatic entries in certain series. Entries were also granted for the winners of the Michelin Energy Endurance Challenge in both the ALMS and the LMS. A final entry was granted to the champion in the LMS' Formula Le Mans category, and the winner received their invitation in Le Mans Prototype 2 (LMP2). As automatic entries were granted to teams, teams were allowed to change their cars from the previous year to the next, but not their category. Automatic invitations in the two GTE categories could be swapped between the two based on the driver line-ups chosen by those teams. As the ALMS did not separate between the Pro and Am categories, only a single GTE invitation was granted for their class champion.

On 24 November 2011, the list of automatic entries was announced by the ACO. Peugeot Sport chose not to accept their automatic invitation as they withdrew from sports car racing in January 2012 due to financial difficulties. BMW Team RLL and Pegasus Racing were the other two teams who did not take up their entries because both teams elected to focus on their respective series during the 2012 season.

Automatic entries for the 2012 24 Hours of Le Mans
Reason Entered	LMP1	LMP2	LMGTE Pro	LMGTE Am
1st in the 24 Hours of Le Mans	(Germany) Audi Sport Team Joest	(United Kingdom) Greaves Motorsport	(United States) Corvette Racing	(France) Larbre Compétition
1st in the Le Mans Series	(Switzerland) Rebellion Racing	(United Kingdom) Greaves Motorsport	(Italy) AF Corse	(France) IMSA Performance Matmut
2nd in the Le Mans Series	(France) Pescarolo Team	(United Kingdom) Strakka Racing	(United Kingdom) JMW Motorsport	(Italy) AF Corse
1st in the American Le Mans Series	(United States) Dyson Racing Team	Not Awarded	(United States) BMW Team RLL	
2nd in the American Le Mans Series	(United States) Muscle Milk Aston Martin Racing	Not Awarded	(United States) Corvette Racing	
1st in the Petit Le Mans	(France) Peugeot Sport Total	(United States) Level 5 Motorsports	(Italy) AF Corse	(United States) Krohn Racing
1st in Le Mans Series Energy Endurance Challenge	(France) Pescarolo Team		(Italy) AF Corse	
1st in American Le Mans Series Energy Endurance Challenge	(United States) Dyson Racing Team		(United States) BMW Team RLL	
1st in Le Mans Series FLM category		(France) Pegasus Racing		

=== Entry list ===
In conjunction with the announcement of entries for the 2012 FIA WEC, the ACO announced the full 56-car entry list and nine-vehicle reserve list at a press conference in Paris on 2 February. In addition to the 30 guaranteed entries from the WEC, 5 came from the ALMS, 3 from the LMS, while the rest of the field was filled with one-off entries only competing at Le Mans.

=== Garage 56 ===
For the 56th and final entry for the 2012 Le Mans race, the ACO promoted cars which featured advancements in technology, either for performance or ecological improvement. Three projects were submitted to the ACO, with the automatic entry being granted to an American group by the name of Project 56 who developed the DeltaWing concept originally proposed for the American IndyCar Series. The extremely lightweight car features a layout that is far removed from the style of Le Mans Prototypes. The project was backed by Highcroft Racing, All American Racers and the Panoz Group. Two other entries had been granted reserve status if the DeltaWing team withdrew: the Swiss-developed GreenGT LMP-H2, which utilized a hydrogen fuel cell to run electric motors within a Le Mans Prototype style body, and the French Courage 0.12 used stored energy to drive electric motors.

=== Reserves ===
Nine reserves were initially nominated by the ACO, limited to the LMP2 (five) and both of the LMGTE (four) categories. The Dyson Racing teams withdrew both of their Lola B12/60-Mazda cars from the entry list on 16 April, citing a financial difficulty preventing the team from obtaining the necessary budget to compete at Le Mans and a desire to focus on the ALMS. This promoted the No. 30 Status Grand Prix Lola B12/80 and the No. 48 Murphy Prototypes Oreca 03-Nissan cars to the race entry list. That same day, the ACO released a revised entry list confirming the withdrawal of the Dyson entries as well as the Jetalliance, Hope Racing, Lotus Cars and Aston Martin Racing reserve entries. By the event's start, three reserved entries had not been promoted to the race entry.

== Testing and practice ==
A test day was held on 3 June, two weeks prior to the race, and required all race entrants to participate in eight hours of track time divided into two sessions. A second Level 5 Motorsports HPD ARX-03b for Scott Tucker, the No. 32 Lotus Lola B12/80 and IMSA Performance's Porsche 997 GT3-RSR reserve entries took part. Sébastien Loeb Racing and two DAMS-entered Le Mans Prototype Challenge Oreca FLM09s also participated. Toyota's Stéphane Sarrazin was unable to take part in testing after sustaining facial injuries from a bike accident on the afternoon of 2 June.

Duval set the fastest lap in the first session at 3:27.738 in the No. 3 Audi R18 Ultra. McNish later improved to a 3:25.927 lap in the No. 2 Audi R18 e-tron quattro though he crashed at Tertre Rouge corner with one hour remaining and was unable to continue. He was followed by Lotterer's No. 1 Audi in second and Duval fell to third. The fastest Toyota TS030 Hybrid was fourth courtesy of a lap from Alexander Wurz and the fastest privateer LMP1 entry was Danny Watts' No. 21 Strakka Racing HPD ARX-03a car in sixth. At the end of the first session, Guillaume Moreau crashed the No. 15 OAK Racing Pescarolo car heavily against a concrete barrier in the Porsche Curves, sustaining a fracture to the T12 vertebrae on his spinal cord. He underwent an operation at the Centre Hospitalier Universitaire d'Angers to reduce the pressure on his spinal cord and was ruled out of the race. His place was taken by former Peugeot driver Franck Montagny. Olivier Pla's OAK Morgan LMP2 car led in LMP2 as Frédéric Makowiecki in the No. 59 Luxury Racing Ferrari 458 Italia GT2 was the fastest driver in LMGTE Pro and Allan Simonsen helped Aston Martin to be fastest in LMGTE Am. Separate crashes from Piergiuseppe Perazzini, Rui Águas, Jordan Taylor, Pierre Thiriet and Gianmaria Bruni led to disruptions during the second session.

After the test several prototype teams, including all Audi, Toyota, Pescarolo and Starworks Motorsports cars participated in an unofficial test on the shorter Bugatti Circuit on 6 June to ensure car components were working efficiently before the race. Official practice was held on 13 June with the full 56-car field on track for four hours. Audi led from the start once again, with Duval and later Tréluyer setting the early pace. Kristensen went faster before a lap of 3:25.163 from Lotterer at the end of the session made him quickest and Audi took the first four places. Kazuki Nakajima was the fastest Toyota driver in fifth and his teammate Anthony Davidson was sixth. A powertrain issue stopped the No. 8 Toyota on the Mulsanne Straight and it required an engine change. Watts was the fastest LMP1 privateer in seventh and Sébastien Bourdais's No. 17 Pescarolo Dome-Judd placed eighth. The No. 16 Pescarolo car of Jean-Christophe Boullion spun and crashed into a guardrail at 268 km/h (167 mph), damaging his ribs and leaving him unable to compete for the rest of the race meeting. Tom Kimber-Smith in the No. 44 Starworks HPD ARX-03b vehicle led in LMP2 with a 3:39.669 lap, ahead of the No. 38 Jota Zytek Z11SN car of Sam Hancock and Warren Hughes' No. 48 Murphy Prototypes Oreca entry. The LMGTE Pro category was led by the No. 97 Aston Martin of Darren Turner with a time of 3:57.036 and Patrick Pilet in the No. 79 Flying Lizard Porsche was fastest in LMGTE Am and was within 1.2 seconds of Turner's pace. The No. 51 AF Corse Ferrari caused a stoppage after Giancarlo Fisichella pirouetted and heavily damaged the car's rear-left corner in the Porsche Curves. The ACO and the FIA applied force majeure and allowed the car's chassis to be transported to AF Corse's factory in Piacenza for reconstruction.

== Qualifying ==
The first of three two-hour qualifying sessions to determine the race's starting order through the quickest laps set by each team's fastest driver began late 13 June night under clear conditions. Audi led from the first minutes of the session with a flying lap from Oliver Jarvis in the No. 4 Audi, followed by Kristensen overtaking Jarvis soon after. He was followed by Lotterer whose final timed lap of 3:25.453 earned the No. 1 Audi team provisional pole position. Kristensen's time put the No. 2 car second and Duval's No. 3 entry finished the session third. The No. 7 Toyota of Nicolas Lapierre was 1.7 seconds adrift of the fastest Audi in fourth. Mike Rockenfeller's No. 4 Audi took fifth and Davidson's No. 8 Toyota in sixth was the slowest of all the hybrid cars. Watts, driving the No. 21 Strakka HPD, was the top non-hybrid LMP1 vehicle in seventh. Mathias Beche drove the No. 46 Thiriet by TDS Oreca to provisional pole in LMP2 with a lap of 3:39.252 ahead of the Murphy Oreca car of Brendon Hartley and Kimber-Smith's Starworks HPD vehicle. Keiko Ihara crashed the No. 29 Gulf Racing Middle East Lola car at the Dunlop Curves and was extricated from a barrier by recovery vehicles. The Pro class of LMGTE had Chevrolet lead from the start with the fastest lap set by Oliver Gavin in the No. 74 C6.R at 3:55.910. Ferrari, Aston Martin and Porsche all had cars within two seconds of the Corvette. Pilet's Flying Lizard Porsche set the pace in LMGTE Am, followed by Sean Edwards' No. 75 Prospeed Competition car and Simonsen's Aston Martin. The experimental DeltaWing car driven by Michael Krumm suffered a heavy jolt on a kerb that activated its onboard fire extinguisher and the master electrical switch, disabling the engine.

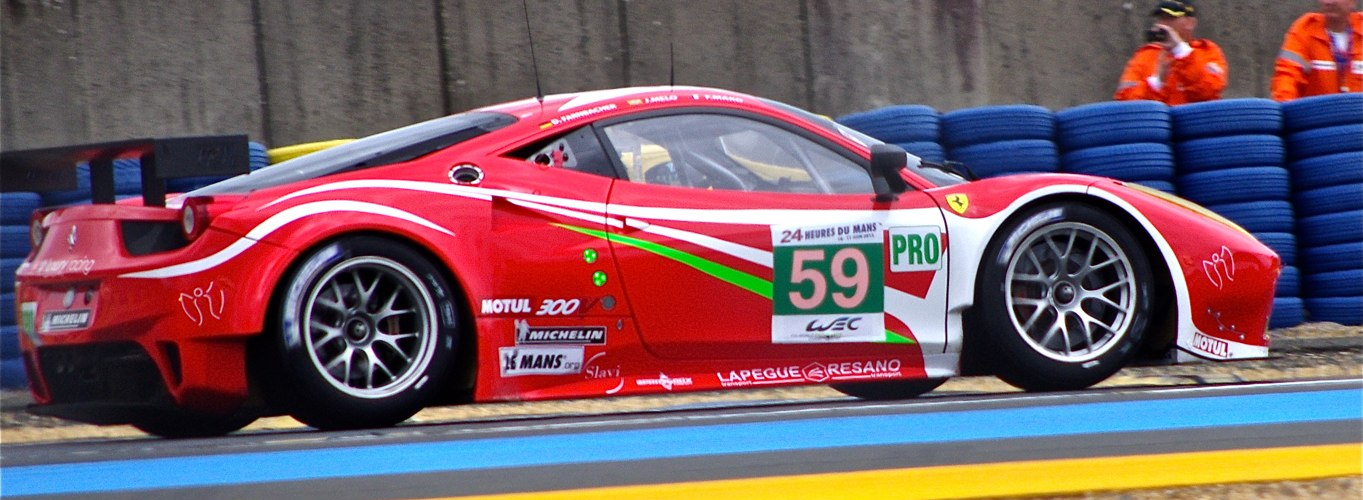
The No. 59 Luxury Racing Ferrari 458 Italia GT2 that took pole position in LMGTE Pro

The weather was clear for the second session on the evening of 14 June. Duval's Audi R18 Ultra was quickest in the session with a lap of 3:24.098 on 30 minutes to go and passed Lotterer's No. 1 Audi for provisional pole position. McNish's No. 2 car finished the session third at the conclusion of a final six-lap stint as Davidson prevented Audi from taking the first four positions in the No. 8 Toyota. The No. 4 Audi of Marco Bonanomi fell to fifth and Toyota's No. 7 entry driven by Nakajima dropped to sixth after Lapierre lost control of its rear and spun into some grass entering the Ford Chicane. Watts' Strakka HPD improved its best lap to ensure it remained the fastest non-hybrid LMP1 vehicle in seventh with Neel Jani's No. 12 Rebellion Lola-Toyota eighth. One second covered the first six vehicles in LMP2 as Pla gave OAK's Oreca car provisional pole in class at the session's conclusion with a time of 3:38.598 despite a driver error into a gravel trap at Indianapolis corner. Nelson Panciatici's No. 26 Signatech car was second. In LMGTE Pro, Makowiecki moved the No. 59 Luxury Ferrari to the provisional category pole position. Turner helped Aston Martin to finish the session second and Tommy Milner's No. 74 Corvette took third. The No. 58 Luxury Ferrari was the fastest LMGTE Am car of the session yet it was more than 1.2 seconds behind the Flying Lizard Porsche's pole lap.

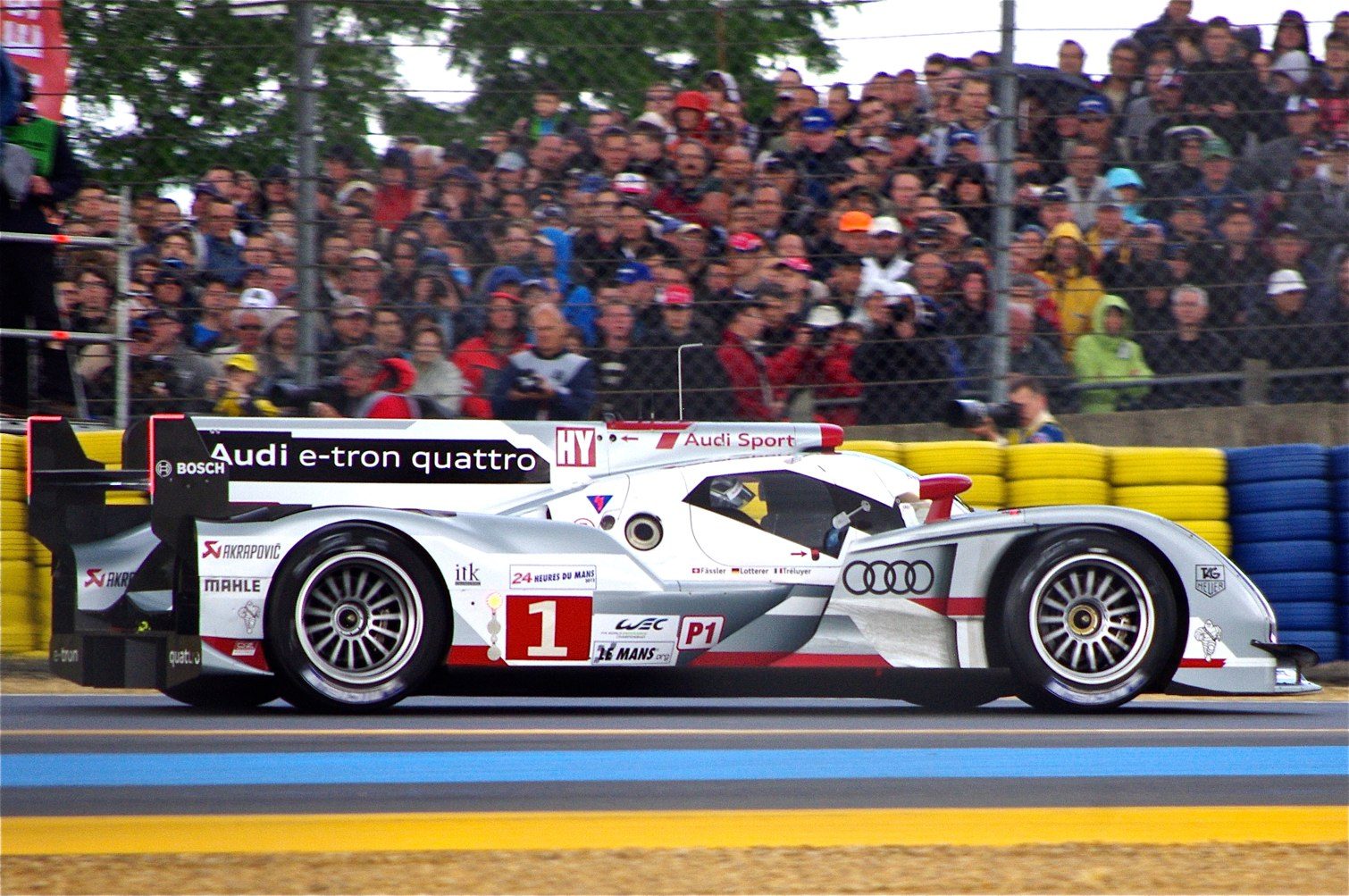
André Lotterer earned the seventh pole position for Audi at Le Mans

In the third session, Lotterer in the No. 1 R18 e-tron quattro set a new fastest lap of 3:23.787 after 13 minutes and held the top of the time sheets to take pole position for Audi. Audi was the first manufacturer to earn pole position with a hybrid electric vehicle at Le Mans and took its seventh overall pole at the race. Duval improved the No. 3 Audi's lap to sit alongside the No. 1 car on the grid's front row. The No. 8 Toyota of Davidson closed to almost within a second of the pole sitting Audi with 15 minutes remaining to take third position. Kristensen separated the two Toyota entries in fourth place as Nakajima qualified the No. 7 TS030 Hybrid fifth. The final manufacturer vehicle was Jarvis' No. 4 Audi in sixth. Watts' Strakka won against the Rebellion car of Jani to be the fastest non-hybrid LMP1 car in seventh. Seiji Ara in the No. 17 Pescarolo Dome car made impact with a barrier at the Porsche Curves and brought out the sole stoppage of 10 minutes in all three sessions. In LMP2, John Martin's No. 26 ADR-Delta Oreca vehicle set a time of 3:38.181 in the first minutes of the session to move the team to pole position and its lap was unchallenged thereafter. Pla's OAK Oreca car fell to second and Panciatici's Signatech vehicle started from third after an error during the session. The No. 97 Aston Martin of Turner was unable to better the car's time to displace Makowiecki's No. 59 Luxury Racing Ferrari at the top of LMGTE Pro and Milner's No. 74 Corvette remained third in category. The lead in LMGTE Am remained with the Flying Lizard Porsche, 0.012 seconds ahead of the No. 77 Team Felbermayr-Proton Pro category car.

=== Qualifying results ===
Pole position winners in each class are indicated in bold. The fastest time set by each entry is denoted in gray.

Final qualifying classification
Pos	No.	Team	Car	Class	Qualifying 1	Qualifying 2	Qualifying 3	Gap	Grid
1	**1**	**Audi Sport Team Joest**	**Audi R18 e-tron quattro**	**LMP1**	**3:25.453**	**3:24.997**	**3:23.787**	—	**1**
2	3	Audi Sport Team Joest	Audi R18 ultra	LMP1	3:26.694	3:24.078	3:27.578	+0.291	2
3	8	Toyota Racing	Toyota TS030 Hybrid	LMP1	3:28.295	3:26.151	3:24.842	+1.055	3
4	2	Audi Sport Team Joest	Audi R18 e-tron quattro	LMP1	3:26.536	3:26.038	3:25.433	+1.646	4
5	7	Toyota Racing	Toyota TS030 Hybrid	LMP1	3:27.191	3:26.502	3:25.488	+1.701	5
6	4	Audi Sport North America	Audi R18 ultra	LMP1	3:27.554	3:26.420	3:26.600	+2.633	6
7	21	Strakka Racing	HPD ARX-03a-Honda	LMP1	3:32.750	3:29.622	3:37.253	+5.835	7
8	12	Rebellion Racing	Lola B12/60-Toyota	LMP1	3:33.211	3:29.837	3:34.476	+6.050	8
9	13	Rebellion Racing	Lola B12/60-Toyota	LMP1	3:33.140	3:31.866	3:41.533	+8.079	9
10	17	Pescarolo Team	Dome S102.5-Judd	LMP1	3:34.716	3:34.925	3:33.066	+9.279	10
11	22	JRM	HPD ARX-03a-Honda	LMP1	3:37.088	No Time	3:35.421	+11.634	11
12	15	OAK Racing	OAK Pescarolo 01-Judd	LMP1	3:38.414	3:37.367	3:35.584	+11.797	12
13	16	Pescarolo Team	Pescarolo 03-Judd	LMP1	No Time	3:37.485	3:48.716	+13.698	—^{1}
14	**25**	**ADR-Delta**	**Oreca 03-Nissan**	**LMP2**	**3:41.791**	**3:40.174**	**3:38.181**	**+14.394**	**13**
15	24	OAK Racing	Morgan LMP2-Judd	LMP2	3:40.902	3:38.598	3:40.310	+14.811	14
16	26	Signatech-Nissan	Oreca 03-Nissan	LMP2	3:42.157	3:39.152	3:44.622	+15.365	15
17	46	Thiriet by TDS Racing	Oreca 03-Nissan	LMP2	3:39.252	3:41.975	3:41.990	+15.465	16
18	49	PeCom Racing	Oreca 03-Nissan	LMP2	3:41.916	3:39.711	3:40.292	+15.924	17
19	48	Murphy Prototypes	Oreca 03-Nissan	LMP2	3:39.877	3:40.652	3:42.057	+16.090	18
20	35	OAK Racing	Morgan LMP2-Nissan	LMP2	3:41.721	3:39.899	3:41.707	+16.112	19
21	30	Status Grand Prix	Lola B12/80-Judd	LMP2	3:41.451	3:42.518	3:40.280	+16.493	20
22	44	Starworks Motorsport	HPD ARX-03b-Honda	LMP2	3:40.639	3:41.863	3:40.471	+16.684	21
23	45	Boutsen Ginion Racing	Oreca 03-Nissan	LMP2	3:40.727	3:43.763	3:42.949	+16.940	22
24	42	Greaves Motorsport	Zytek Z11SN-Nissan	LMP2	3:42.125	3:40.738	3:43.230	+16.951	23
25	38	Jota	Zytek Z11SN- Nissan	LMP2	3:41.287	3:41.428	No Time	+17.500	24
26	23	Signatech-Nissan	Oreca 03-Nissan	LMP2	3:44.495	3:42.581	3:41.982	+18.195	25
27	33	Level 5 Motorsports	HPD ARX-03b-Honda	LMP2	3:42.224	No Time	3:42.696	+18.437	26
28	41	Greaves Motorsport	Zytek Z11SN-Nissan	LMP2	3:47.408	3:43.406	3:42.292	+18.505	27
29	0	Highcroft Racing	DeltaWing-Nissan	CDNT	3:42.612	3:48.142	3:50.903	+18.825	28
30	40	Race Performance	Oreca 03-Judd	LMP2	3:48.124	3:43.619	3:46.200	+19.832	29
31	31	Lotus	Lola B12/80-Lotus	LMP2	3:48.067	No Time	3:45.664	+21.877	30
32	28	Gulf Racing Middle East	Lola B12/80-Nissan	LMP2	3:50.526	3:47.244	4:15.649	+23.457	31
33	43	Extrême Limite ARIC	Norma MP200P-Judd	LMP2	3:51.012	3:53.560	3:48.025	+24.238	32
34	**59**	**Luxury Racing**	**Ferrari 458 Italia GT2**	**LMGTE Pro**	**3:56.076**	**3:55.393**	**3:58.647**	**+31.606**	**33**
35	97	Aston Martin Racing	Aston Martin Vantage GTE	LMGTE Pro	3:57.466	3:55.870	3:56.036	+32.083	34
36	74	Corvette Racing	Chevrolet Corvette C6.R	LMGTE Pro	3:55.910	3:58.214	3:57.981	+32.123	35
37	71	AF Corse	Ferrari 458 Italia GT2	LMGTE Pro	3:57.509	3:58.960	3:56.484	+32.697	36
38	73	Corvette Racing	Chevrolet Corvette C6.R	LMGTE Pro	3:57.181	3:59.433	3:59.471	+33.394	37
39	**79**	**Flying Lizard Motorsports**	**Porsche 997 GT3-RSR**	**LMGTE Am**	**3:57.594**	**4:09.762**	**4:03.420**	**+33.807**	**38**
40	77	Team Felbermayr-Proton	Porsche 997 GT3-RSR	LMGTE Pro	3:57.648	3:57.606	4:19.147	+33.819	39
41	75	Prospeed Competition	Porsche 997 GT3-RSR	LMGTE Am	3:58.035	9:51.593	3:59.739	+34.248	40
42	80	Flying Lizard Motorsports	Porsche 997 GT3-RSR	LMGTE Pro	3:58.717	4:00.011	3:59.372	+34.930	41
43	99	Aston Martin Racing	Aston Martin Vantage GTE	LMGTE Am	3:58.725	4:00.958	No Time	+34.938	42
44	58	Luxury Racing	Ferrari 458 Italia GT2	LMGTE Am	4:00.849	3:58.800	No Time	+35.013	43
45	29	Gulf Racing Middle East	Lola B12/80-Nissan	LMP2	4:14.086	No Time	3:58.895	+35.108	44
46	88	Team Felbermayr-Proton	Porsche 997 GT3-RSR	LMGTE Am	3:59.529	3:59.181	3:59.971	+35.394	45
47	50	Larbre Compétition	Chevrolet Corvette C6.R	LMGTE Am	3:59.192	4:05.426	4:13.459	+35.405	46
48	66	JMW Motorsport	Ferrari 458 Italia GT2	LMGTE Pro	4:00.883	3:59.638	4:10.192	+35.851	47
49	51	AF Corse	Ferrari 458 Italia GT2	LMGTE Pro	No Time	No Time	4:00.025	+36.238	48
50	81	AF Corse	Ferrari 458 Italia GT2	LMGTE Am	4:04.493	4:00.288	4:00.924	+36.501	49
51	67	IMSA Performance Matmut	Porsche 997 GT3-RSR	LMGTE Am	4:00.332	4:00.829	4:07.180	+36.545	50
52	61	AF Corse-Waltrip	Ferrari 458 Italia GT2	LMGTE Am	4:04.861	4:00.691	4:08.217	+36.904	51
53	57	Krohn Racing	Ferrari 458 Italia GT2	LMGTE Am	4:04.698	4:04.075	4:02.323	+38.536	52
54	83	JMB Racing	Ferrari 458 Italia GT2	LMGTE Am	4:04.416	4:02.461	4:20.082	+38.674	53
55	70	Larbre Compétition	Chevrolet Corvette C6.R	LMGTE Am	4:03.021	4:02.969	4:09.709	+39.182	54
56	55	JWA-Avila	Porsche 997 GT3-RSR	LMGTE Am	4:08.170	4:03.661	4:03.705	+39.874	55

Notes:

- **^1**—The No. 16 Pescarolo 03-Judd started from the pit lane after a change of engine overran into the race.

== Warm-up ==
The cars took to the circuit on the morning of 16 June for a 45-minute warm-up session on a waterlogged track. The No. 3 Audi driven by Duval set the fastest lap of 4:03.933 with the sister No. 2 car of Capello second and the pole sitting No. 1 of Lotterer third. Jarvis' No. 4 Audi was fourth and the quickest Toyota was fifth after a lap from Wurz. The fastest LMP2 lap was recorded by the No. 42 Greaves Motorsport Zytek Nissan car of Lucas Ordóñez. AF Corse's No. 51 Ferrari driven by Toni Vilander was the fastest car in LMGTE Pro while Joël Camathias of JWA-Avila helped Porsche to lead in LMGTE Am. During the session, where several cars aquaplaned on the track, Marc Rostan spun the No. 29 Gulf Racing Middle East Lola car on the start/finish straight and Jan Charouz beached the No. 25 ADR-Delta Oreca vehicle in a gravel trap at Dunlop Curve leading to the session being stopped for ten minutes.

== Race ==
=== Start ===
The weather was dry and sunny before the race with an air temperature between 10.5 to 21 °C (50.9 to 69.8 °F) and the track temperature from 15.5 to 26 °C (59.9 to 78.8 °F). Approximately 240,000 spectators attended the race. The French tricolour was waved at 15:00 Central European Summer Time (UTC+02:00), by Takeshi Uchiyamada, the vice president and director of Toyota, to start the race, led by the starting pole sitter Lotterer. A total of 56 cars planned to take the start but the No. 16 Pescarolo 03-Judd car underwent an engine change in the pit lane after it failed during the warm-up session and the No. 21 Strakka HPD vehicle had a gearbox oil leak caused by a seal connecting the driveshaft and the gearbox failing, joining the race 22 minutes after it started. Lotterer maintained his lead on the opening lap and he pulled away from the rest of the field. McNish's No. 2 Audi overtook Sarrazin's No. 8 Toyota for third and he held off a counter-challenge from Sarrazin to keep the position. Light rain that fell on the north section of the track did not affect the race.

In LMP2, John Martin led the first nine laps until Pla's OAK car passed him during pit stop rotation. The No. 59 Luxury Racing Ferrari of Jaime Melo fell to fifth in the opening laps as LMGTE Am began as a multi-car battle between representatives of Porsche, Ferrari and Aston Martin with the lead of the class changing multiple times during the first hour. The LMGTE classes continued to be closely contested in the second hour with the No. 97 Aston Martin of Stefan Mücke, AF Corse's No. 51 Ferrari of Bruni and Gavin's No. 74 Corvette duelling for the head of the Pro category. Kimber-Smith was lapping faster than Soheil Ayari's No. 49 PeCom vehicle in the LMP2 category at the time and he moved the Starworks team to second in class. The hour had the first retirement with Rostan's No. 29 Gulf Racing Middle East Lola car sustaining a broken front-left wheel alignment from an accident leaving the Porsche Curves. Pilet and later Spencer Pumpelly's No. 79 Flying Lizard car took a clear lead in LMGTE Am after the No. 99 Aston Martin of Simonsen developed a misfire caused by a sensor at the bottom of the engine failing. LMGTE Pro continued to be a close battle between Milner's No. 74 Corvette, Turner's No. 97 Aston Martin and Bruni's No. 51 AF Corse Ferrari with the three cars nose-to-tail on the circuit and the lead changed frequently. The Ferrari was subsequently able to remain on track for longer than its competitors during a sequence of pit stops.

Nearly four hours into the race, Kristensen's No. 2 Audi returned to the garage so that the team's mechanics could remove a large amount of rubber debris lodged in its right-rear suspension arm and created a vibration. Kristensen returned to the race in fifth position and a routine pit stop for Duval's No. 3 car promoted the Toyota cars of Lapierre and Buemi to second and third. Although Toyota had less fuel economy than Audi, Buemi and later his teammate Lapierre were able to attack in the fourth hour and lowered Tréluyer's lead to twenty seconds. Jody Firth in the No. 48 Murphy Prototypes Oreca-Nissan vehicle passed Ryan Dalziel's Starworks HPD car for third in LMP2 and he pulled away from Dalziel to lead him by twenty seconds. Lapierre sustained damage to the No. 7 Toyota's right rear wing endplate which later detached and he continued in second position. Not long after Dumas was lapping the LMGTE-Am leading No. 79 Flying Lizard Porsche of Seth Neiman at the first Mulsanne Straight chicane and he understeered heavily into a tyre barrier with the No. 3 Audi's front-right corner at low speed. He extricated the Audi out of the tyre wall. The car sustained heavy damage to its front bodywork, and required a 26-minute and 34-second pit stop to replace it and dropping the car down the race order. The fifth hour ended with Lapierre prevailing against Tréluyer in a duel for the lead that ended in the Porsche Curves.

=== Evening to night ===
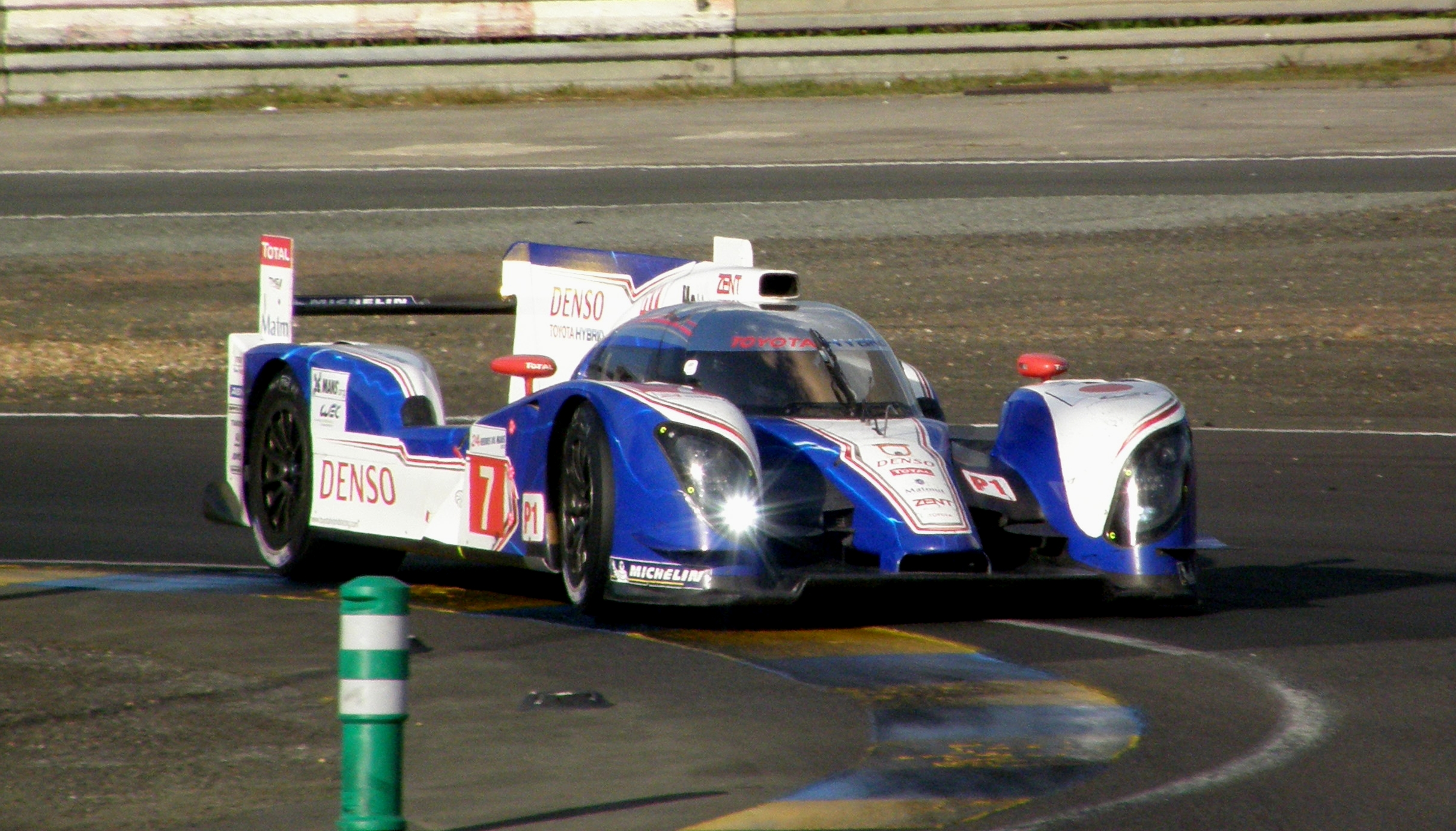
The No. 8 Toyota TS030 Hybrid was involved in a major accident with LMGTE Am Ferrari that forced its retirement in the sixth hour.

At the start of the sixth hour Davidson in third was lapping Perazzini's LMGTE Am-class No. 81 AF Corse Ferrari when the left-rear of the No. 8 Toyota made contact with the front-right of the Ferrari at the end of the Mulsanne Straight at Mulsanne corner. The Toyota rotated through 360 degrees, lifted into the air after its right-rear wheel detached in the collision with the Ferrari and allowed air to penetrate its floor, It struck the tarmac with its front-left corner and hurtled upright at high speed towards a tyre wall at Mulsanne corner. Perrazzini's Ferrari made heavy side contact with an armco metal barrier that deformed it and the vehicle was turned onto its roof. The safety cars were deployed to slow the race as marshals worked for 70 minutes to replace and repair the damaged barriers, clean the circuit and extricate the two cars from the track. Both Davidson and Perrazzini vacated their vehicles without external assistance; Davidson was transported to a local hospital from the circuit's medical centre complaining of shock and back pain. Davidson fractured his T11 and T12 vertebrae while Perrazzini was unhurt.

Half a minute after racing resumed the overall leading No. 1 Audi of Fässler was delayed by slower traffic, causing Nakajima's No. 7 Toyota to collide with the left-hand corner of the No. 0 DeltaWing car of Satoshi Motoyama and sent the latter hard into a concrete barrier beside the circuit. The DeltaWing sustained damage to its steering arm, powertrain and rear bodywork; track marshals pushed it behind the wall to allow mechanics from Highcroft Racing to advise Motoyama on how to repair the car. He spent 90 minutes repairing the car with garage equipment though he was unable to make it mobile and retired. Hartley was the fastest LMP2 driver at the time and he brought the No. 48 Greaves Oreca to the lead of the category. The No. 7 Toyota was driven into the pit lane for repairs to its rear and the crash promoted Audi to the first three positions. Pedro Lamy in the No. 50 Larbre Compétition got involved in a battle with Nicolas Armindo's No. 67 IMSA Performance Porsche for the lead of LMGTE Am. Maxime Martin returned OAK's No. 24 Oreca car to the lead in LMP2 until a puncture during his first lap out of the pit lane after a routine stop allowed the No. 48 Murphy Oreca-Nissan vehicle of Hughes back to the front of the category.

Lotterer had an anxious moment when he made a driver error during the first third of a lap in the No. 1 Audi; he returned to the track without losing the overall lead. Further down the field the fuel efficiency of the Ferrari 458 Italia allowed the No. 51 AF Corse of Bruni to remain in contention with the LMGTE Pro leading Corvette of Milner. As it turned 17 June, the No. 48 Murphy Oreca-Nissan relinquished the lead of LMP2 when driver Hughes entered the pit lane with a right-rear puncture that sent the car into a spin at the exit to Arnage corner and caused damage to its rear wheel arch and deck. Pla retook the class lead in the No. 24 OAK Oreca until he too was forced to slow and enter the pit lane with a sudden loss of oil pressure that was unable to be rectified and forced the car's retirement, returning the No. 44 Starworks HPD car of Kimber-Smith and later Dalziel to the category lead. In the eleventh hour, Westbrook had just relieved Milner in the No. 74 Corvette when its left-rear tyre detached in the Dunlop Esses close to the Dunlop Bridge and slowing him for the rest of the lap en route to the pit lane for repairs to the car's bodywork and underwent a change of brake discs. The car relinquished the lead of LMGTE Pro it had held for 66 consecutive laps to the No. 51 AF Corse.

Toyota lost its one remaining entry when the No. 7 car retired after 10½ hours with an engine failure. The No. 74 Corvette emerged on the track soon after though it was once again involved in an incident when Westbrook crashed at the first Mulsanne Straight chicane and necessitating repairs to its bodywork and a change of differential and halfshaft. A major accident for Frankie Montecalvo's No. 58 Luxury Racing Ferrari caused the car to retire with heavy left-hand side damage and its front wing removed. As the race approached half distance, the No. 1 Audi of Fässler led Kristensen's No. 2 car by 40 seconds before a driver change, Bonamoni's No. 3 entry was in third position and the recovering No. 4 driven by Dumas was fourth after contact with the No. 70 Larbre Corvette at the Ford Chicane. Makowiecki lost ground to the LMGTE Pro leading AF Corse Ferrari of Fisichella in the No. 59 Luxury Racing car after a driver error put him into a gravel trap at Indianapolis corner. McNish took over the No. 2 Audi and lapped in the 3 minutes and 30 seconds range to which Fässler's No. 1 entry responded to stabilise a gap to 1 minute and 20 seconds at the conclusion of the 13th hour.

=== Morning to early afternoon ===
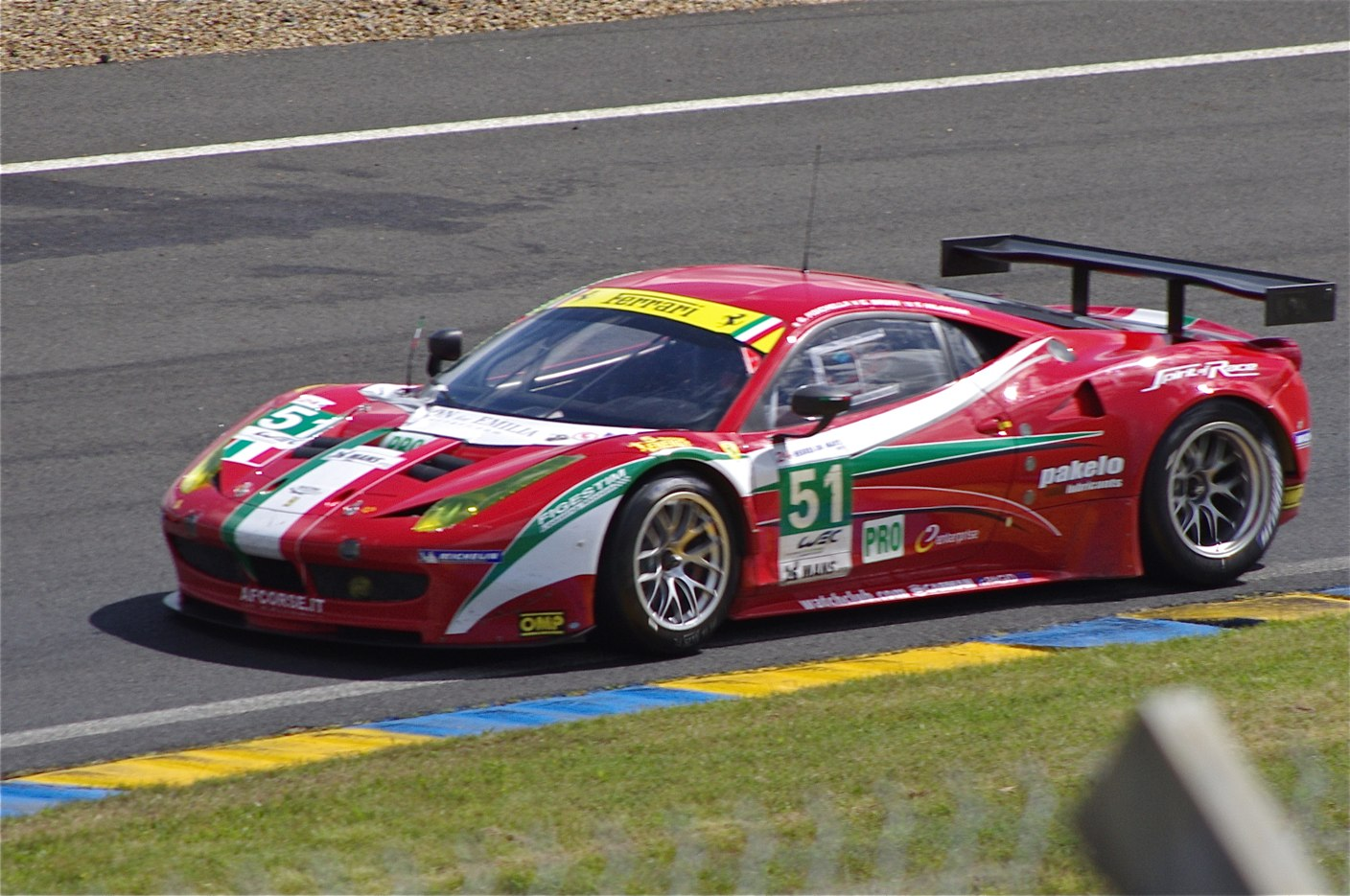
AF Corse won for the first time at the 24 Hours of Le Mans with the No. 51 Ferrari.

In the early morning the No. 1 Audi of Fässler spun in the Porsche Curves and made contact with the rear of the car against a barrier, relinquishing first place to McNish's No. 2 car. During this period a broken left-rear transmission on Hartley's No. 48 Murphy Oreca-Nissan failed and caused one of the car's rear wheels to lock before track marshals pushed it towards the pit lane for it to be retired from the event. Abdulaziz Al Faisal spun and crashed backwards against a concrete barrier in the Porsche Curves causing enough damage to retire the vehicle and required the deployment of the safety cars for the second time in the race. When racing resumed Harold Primat's No. 13 Rebellion Lola car spun on cold tyres exiting the Porsche Curves; he avoided contact with a circuit barrier. The car lost a large amount of time while it was recovered by track marshals and Primat continued in sixth overall. The safety cars allowed Lotterer's No. 1 Audi to return to the lead after McNish entered the pit lane for a routine pit stop. Mücke, holding second place in LMGTE Pro, lost control of the No. 97 Aston Martin, went straight on and made contact with the car's right-hand side against a tyre wall to the right of the track. The car sustained minor damage and after repairs which dropped it four laps, returned to the track third in class. AF Corse had their lead in LMGTE Pro further strengthened when Makowiecki's Luxury Racing Ferrari picked up a right-rear puncture and required the team's mechanics to replace it.

Duval in the No. 3 Audi became the lead challenger to the No. 12 Rebellion Lola car, twice resetting the race's fastest lap and passing the Rebellion for fourth overall. Brian Vickers made minor contact against a wall at Tetre Rouge corner and the No. 71 AF Corse Ferrari sustained a left-front puncture. As he entered the pit lane, the front-left wheel caught fire, which fire marshals extinguished. The car was transported into the garage for repairs to its bodywork. Over three hours after reclaiming the race lead, Fässler encountered the No. 74 Corvette, which spun at Mulsanne corner. He damaged the No. 1 Audi's rear bodywork and diffuser against a barrier in avoidance. Audi told Fässler to remain on the circuit until his next scheduled stop to replace the damaged component. Repairs took more than two minutes to complete and allowed Kristensen's No. 2 car to reclaim the lead following a pit stop for fuel. Kristensen overhauled Fässler in a duel for the lead on the Mulsanne Straight after a driver error sent the latter into a gravel trap without major delay and into the pit lane to repairs to the rear bodywork. Separate pit stop strategies for the No. 1 and 2 Audi cars saw the lead exchange several times, while the No. 13 Rebellion car was forced into the pit lane for a clutch change and forfeiting sixth place to the No. 22 JRM HPD vehicle. Ayari, driving the No. 49 PeCom Oreca, held second place in LMP2 until he ran wide at Indianapolis corner and beached the car in a gravel trap. The car dropped to fourth after recovery vehicles extricated it from the gravel and Ayari made a pit stop to remove debris from it.

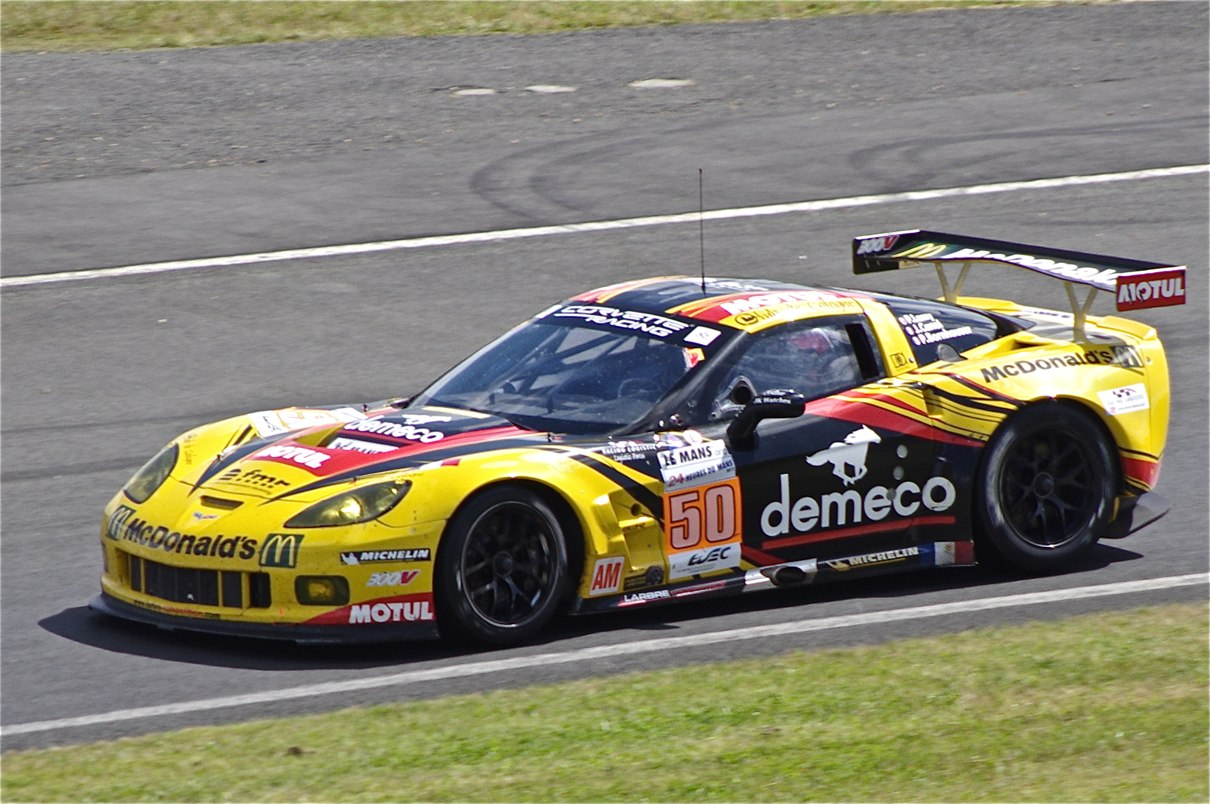
Larbre Compétition took its fifth class victory in Le Mans in the final 20 minutes of the race.

Bonanomi's No. 4 Audi twice stopped on the circuit with a transmission fault that he rectified by resetting the ignition system and kept the car in third position. Not long after an accident for Simon Dolan's No. 38 Jota Zytek in the Porsche Curves caused its retirement in the garage due to extensive damage to its rear. The race-leading No. 1 Audi of Tréluyer spun at the entry to the pit lane as he slowed to comply with the pit lane speed limit. He lost the lead to McNish's No. 2 car who extended it to 47 seconds. Audi suffered two accidents in the 22nd hour that warranted the third deployment of the safety cars. Gené in the No. 3 Audi repeated his co-driver Dumas' accident from the fifth hour, understeering into a wall at the exit to the first Mulsanne Straight chicane and damaged the car's front bodywork and front-right suspension, this time without contact with another car. McNish's No. 2 car had rear oversteer while lapping the No. 59 Luxury Racing Ferrari and punctured a hole on an armco metal barrier in the Porsche Curves. Repairs to the No. 2 Audi dropped McNish one lap behind Lotterer and Gené fell behind the No. 13 Rebellion car in fourth place. After racing resumed, Anthony Pons' No. 76 IMSA Performance Porsche ceded the lead of LMGTE Am to Lamy's No. 50 Larbre Corvette which it maintained to the finish to earn the team's fifth victory in the class after Pons sustained a left-rear puncture on the final lap.

=== Finish ===
The No. 1 Audi R18 e-tron quattro of Fässler, Lotterer and Tréluyer maintained the race lead without trouble for the final two hours of the race, taking the trio's second consecutive win and Audi's eleventh overall in a distance of 5,151.8 km (3,201.2 mi) and 378 laps. Audi completed a sweep of the podium positions with the No. 2 and No. 4 cars in second and third. The Audi R18 e-tron quattro was the first hybrid electric and non-permanent four-wheel drivetrain vehicle to win the 24 Hour race. The Starworks Motorsport team was undaunted in LMP2 and maintained the first-place position it had held for 215 consecutive laps to win, earning Kimber-Smith his third victory in the class and Dalziel and Pottolicchio's first. The Thiriet by TDS Racing following a loose nut in the throttle linkage that led Beche drive straight across a Mulsanne Straight chicane was second in LMP2. PeCom Racing completed the class podium in third. AF Corse held their three-lap lead over Luxury Racing in LMGTE Pro and took their first class win after completing 336 laps. It gave Bruni his second category win, and Fisichella and Vilander's first. Aston Martin came third in the category. The IMSA Performance team were able to secure a second-place finish in LMGTE Am after the team's late event puncture and the Krohn Racing squad followed in third. There were eighteen outright lead changes amongst three cars during the race. The No. 1 Audi's 326 laps led was more than any other car. A total of 35 out of 56 starting vehicles finished the race.

== Post-race ==
The top three teams in each of the four classes appeared on the podium to collect their trophies and spoke to the media in the later press conferences. Lotterer said Audi's victory over Peugeot in the 2011 edition provided him with the confidence to challenge Toyota, "For me, I'm more new in Le Mans so to be in that situation was amazing, so this year we had a bit more confidence within the team. We know we can trust each other even more and this gave us good potential. But you come to Le Mans and you can't expect to win, you just do your best and hope that it will work." McNish apologised for the accident that caused the crew of the No. 2 Audi to lose a chance at victory, "I'm sorry for our team: Dindo, Tom, the engineers and the mechanics. They did a perfect job throughout the race. Despite a few problems we were in contention for victory up to my accident." Capello revealed that he said to McNish that the crash could have occurred to any driver, "For sure I felt disappointed when I saw the car in the wall, but as a driver immediately my thoughts went to Allan because I know he was giving 100% to try to close the gap as much as possible to the #1 car."

Davidson was flown back to his home in Oxford on 20 June to begin a three-month recovery period. He attributed the design of his race seat and head rest to saving him from paralysis, "It held me, supported me and arguably was the thing that saved me from further compression and maybe the worst case scenario of being paralysed now instead. When you look at everything involved, I think I got away with it the lightest I was ever going to." Members of the Toyota team went to the Nissan garage to apologise for the collision that resulted in the retirement of the DeltaWing. The team principal, Pascal Vasselon, stated Toyota's pace in the first half of the race was a realistic of what it could achieve, "We were not looking for an aggressive start and leading for 10 minutes. I know some people were expecting us to try to do that at the start, but no. The drivers knew they had to be safe at the start, then at the beginning the balance was not perfect. It was changing, the track was changing. We started on a very green track [because of the rain overnight] and it's important to be balanced for when the grip builds up, that was our target." Nakajima expressed disappointment to retire early and said it was Toyota's objective to finish the race.

Due to the result of the event, McNish, Kristensen and Capello moved to the lead of the Drivers' Championship with 77 points, 6½ ahead of the race winners Lotterer, Fässler and Tréluyer in second place. Dumas and Duval fell from first to third with 67 points, Gené stood in fourth position with 49 points and the Rebellion trio of Nick Heidfeld, Jani and Nico Prost rounded out the top five with 42½. Audi continued to maintain their lead over the non-scoring Toyota in the Manufacturers' Championship with five races left in the season.

== Official results ==
Class winners are marked in bold. Cars failing to complete 70 per cent of winner's distance (264 laps) are marked as Not Classified (NC).

Final race classification
Pos	Class	No.	Team	Drivers	Chassis	Tyre	Laps	Time
Pos	Class	No.	Team	Drivers	Engine	Tyre	Laps	Time
1	**LMP1**	**1**	**(Germany) Audi Sport Team Joest**	**(Germany) André Lotterer (Switzerland) Marcel Fässler (France) Benoît Tréluyer**	**Audi R18 e-tron quattro**	M	**378**	**24:01'16.128**
1	**LMP1**	**1**	**(Germany) Audi Sport Team Joest**	**(Germany) André Lotterer (Switzerland) Marcel Fässler (France) Benoît Tréluyer**	**Audi TDI 3.7 L Turbo V6 (Hybrid Diesel)**	M	**378**	**24:01'16.128**
2	LMP1	2	(Germany) Audi Sport Team Joest	(United Kingdom) Allan McNish (Italy) Rinaldo Capello (Denmark) Tom Kristensen	Audi R18 e-tron quattro	M	377	+1 Lap
2	LMP1	2	(Germany) Audi Sport Team Joest	(United Kingdom) Allan McNish (Italy) Rinaldo Capello (Denmark) Tom Kristensen	Audi TDI 3.7 L Turbo V6 (Hybrid Diesel)	M	377	+1 Lap
3	LMP1	4	(Germany) Audi Sport North America	(United Kingdom) Oliver Jarvis (Italy) Marco Bonanomi (Germany) Mike Rockenfeller	Audi R18 ultra	M	375	+3 Laps
3	LMP1	4	(Germany) Audi Sport North America	(United Kingdom) Oliver Jarvis (Italy) Marco Bonanomi (Germany) Mike Rockenfeller	Audi TDI 3.7 L Turbo V6 (Diesel)	M	375	+3 Laps
4	LMP1	12	(Switzerland) Rebellion Racing	(France) Nico Prost (Germany) Nick Heidfeld (Switzerland) Neel Jani	Lola B12/60	M	367	+11 Laps
4	LMP1	12	(Switzerland) Rebellion Racing	(France) Nico Prost (Germany) Nick Heidfeld (Switzerland) Neel Jani	Toyota RV8KLM 3.4 L V8	M	367	+11 Laps
5	LMP1	3	(Germany) Audi Sport Team Joest	(Spain) Marc Gené (France) Romain Dumas (France) Loïc Duval	Audi R18 ultra	M	366	+12 Laps
5	LMP1	3	(Germany) Audi Sport Team Joest	(Spain) Marc Gené (France) Romain Dumas (France) Loïc Duval	Audi TDI 3.7 L Turbo V6 (Diesel)	M	366	+12 Laps
6	LMP1	22	(United Kingdom) JRM	(Australia) David Brabham (United Kingdom) Peter Dumbreck (India) Karun Chandhok	HPD ARX-03a	M	357	+21 Laps
6	LMP1	22	(United Kingdom) JRM	(Australia) David Brabham (United Kingdom) Peter Dumbreck (India) Karun Chandhok	Honda LM-V8 3.4 L V8	M	357	+21 Laps
7	**LMP2**	**44**	**(United States) Starworks Motorsport**	**(Venezuela) Enzo Potolicchio (United Kingdom) Ryan Dalziel (United Kingdom) Tom Kimber-Smith**	**HPD ARX-03b**	D	**354**	**+24 Laps**
7	**LMP2**	**44**	**(United States) Starworks Motorsport**	**(Venezuela) Enzo Potolicchio (United Kingdom) Ryan Dalziel (United Kingdom) Tom Kimber-Smith**	**Honda HR28TT 2.8 L Turbo V6**	D	**354**	**+24 Laps**
8	LMP2	46	(France) Thiriet by TDS Racing	(France) Pierre Thiriet (Switzerland) Mathias Beche (France) Christophe Tinseau	Oreca 03	D	353	+25 Laps
8	LMP2	46	(France) Thiriet by TDS Racing	(France) Pierre Thiriet (Switzerland) Mathias Beche (France) Christophe Tinseau	Nissan VK45DE 4.5 L V8	D	353	+25 Laps
9	LMP2	49	(Argentina) PeCom Racing	(Argentina) Luis Pérez Companc (Germany) Pierre Kaffer (France) Soheil Ayari	Oreca 03	D	352	+26 Laps
9	LMP2	49	(Argentina) PeCom Racing	(Argentina) Luis Pérez Companc (Germany) Pierre Kaffer (France) Soheil Ayari	Nissan VK45DE 4.5 L V8	D	352	+26 Laps
10	LMP2	26	(France) Signatech-Nissan	(France) Pierre Ragues (France) Nelson Panciatici (Russia) Roman Rusinov	Oreca 03	D	351	+27 Laps
10	LMP2	26	(France) Signatech-Nissan	(France) Pierre Ragues (France) Nelson Panciatici (Russia) Roman Rusinov	Nissan VK45DE 4.5 L V8	D	351	+27 Laps
11	LMP1	13	(Switzerland) Rebellion Racing	(Italy) Andrea Belicchi (Netherlands) Jeroen Bleekemolen (Switzerland) Harold Primat	Lola B12/60	M	350	+28 Laps
11	LMP1	13	(Switzerland) Rebellion Racing	(Italy) Andrea Belicchi (Netherlands) Jeroen Bleekemolen (Switzerland) Harold Primat	Toyota RV8KLM 3.4 L V8	M	350	+28 Laps
12	LMP2	41	(United Kingdom) Greaves Motorsport	(Germany) Christian Zugel (Ecuador) Elton Julian (Mexico) Ricardo González	Zytek Z11SN	D	348	+30 Laps
12	LMP2	41	(United Kingdom) Greaves Motorsport	(Germany) Christian Zugel (Ecuador) Elton Julian (Mexico) Ricardo González	Nissan VK45DE 4.5 L V8	D	348	+30 Laps
13	LMP2	25	(United Kingdom) ADR-Delta	(Australia) John Martin (Thailand) Tor Graves (Czech Republic) Jan Charouz	Oreca 03	D	346	+32 Laps
13	LMP2	25	(United Kingdom) ADR-Delta	(Australia) John Martin (Thailand) Tor Graves (Czech Republic) Jan Charouz	Nissan VK45DE 4.5 L V8	D	346	+32 Laps
14	LMP2	35	(France) OAK Racing	(Denmark) David Heinemeier Hansson (Belgium) Bas Leinders (Belgium) Maxime Martin	Morgan LMP2	D	341	+37 Laps
14	LMP2	35	(France) OAK Racing	(Denmark) David Heinemeier Hansson (Belgium) Bas Leinders (Belgium) Maxime Martin	Nissan VK45DE 4.5 L V8	D	341	+37 Laps
15	LMP2	42	(United Kingdom) Greaves Motorsport	(United Kingdom) Alex Brundle (United Kingdom) Martin Brundle (Spain) Lucas Ordóñez	Zytek Z11SN	D	340	+38 Laps
15	LMP2	42	(United Kingdom) Greaves Motorsport	(United Kingdom) Alex Brundle (United Kingdom) Martin Brundle (Spain) Lucas Ordóñez	Nissan VK45DE 4.5 L V8	D	340	+38 Laps
16	LMP2	23	(France) Signatech-Nissan	(France) Jordan Tresson (France) Franck Mailleux (France) Olivier Lombard	Oreca 03	D	340	+38 Laps
16	LMP2	23	(France) Signatech-Nissan	(France) Jordan Tresson (France) Franck Mailleux (France) Olivier Lombard	Nissan VK45DE 4.5 L V8	D	340	+38 Laps
17	**LMGTE; Pro**	**51**	**(Italy) AF Corse**	**(Italy) Giancarlo Fisichella (Italy) Gianmaria Bruni (Finland) Toni Vilander**	**Ferrari 458 Italia GT2**	M	**336**	**+42 Laps**
17	**LMGTE; Pro**	**51**	**(Italy) AF Corse**	**(Italy) Giancarlo Fisichella (Italy) Gianmaria Bruni (Finland) Toni Vilander**	**Ferrari F136 4.5 L V8**	M	**336**	**+42 Laps**
18	LMGTE; Pro	59	(France) Luxury Racing	(France) Frédéric Makowiecki (Brazil) Jaime Melo (Germany) Dominik Farnbacher	Ferrari 458 Italia GT2	M	333	+45 Laps
18	LMGTE; Pro	59	(France) Luxury Racing	(France) Frédéric Makowiecki (Brazil) Jaime Melo (Germany) Dominik Farnbacher	Ferrari F136 4.5 L V8	M	333	+45 Laps
19	LMGTE; Pro	97	(United Kingdom) Aston Martin Racing	(Germany) Stefan Mücke (Mexico) Adrián Fernández (United Kingdom) Darren Turner	Aston Martin Vantage GTE	M	332	+46 Laps
19	LMGTE; Pro	97	(United Kingdom) Aston Martin Racing	(Germany) Stefan Mücke (Mexico) Adrián Fernández (United Kingdom) Darren Turner	Aston Martin AM05 4.5 L V8	M	332	+46 Laps
20	**LMGTE; Am**	**50**	**(France) Larbre Compétition**	**(France) Patrick Bornhauser (France) Julien Canal (Portugal) Pedro Lamy**	**Chevrolet Corvette C6.R**	M	**329**	**+49 Laps**
20	**LMGTE; Am**	**50**	**(France) Larbre Compétition**	**(France) Patrick Bornhauser (France) Julien Canal (Portugal) Pedro Lamy**	**Chevrolet LS5.5R 5.5 L V8**	M	**329**	**+49 Laps**
21	LMGTE; Am	67	(France) IMSA Performance Matmut	(France) Anthony Pons (France) Nicolas Armindo (France) Raymond Narac	Porsche 997 GT3-RSR	M	328	+50 Laps
21	LMGTE; Am	67	(France) IMSA Performance Matmut	(France) Anthony Pons (France) Nicolas Armindo (France) Raymond Narac	Porsche M97/74 4.0 L Flat-6	M	328	+50 Laps
22	LMGTE; Pro	71	(Italy) AF Corse	(Italy) Andrea Bertolini (Monaco) Olivier Beretta (Italy) Marco Cioci	Ferrari 458 Italia GT2	M	326	+52 Laps
22	LMGTE; Pro	71	(Italy) AF Corse	(Italy) Andrea Bertolini (Monaco) Olivier Beretta (Italy) Marco Cioci	Ferrari F136 4.5 L V8	M	326	+52 Laps
23	LMGTE; Pro	73	(United States) Corvette Racing	(Spain) Antonio García (Denmark) Jan Magnussen (United States) Jordan Taylor	Chevrolet Corvette C6.R	M	326	+52 Laps
23	LMGTE; Pro	73	(United States) Corvette Racing	(Spain) Antonio García (Denmark) Jan Magnussen (United States) Jordan Taylor	Chevrolet LS5.5R 5.5 L V8	M	326	+52 Laps
24	LMP2	45	(Belgium) Boutsen Ginion Racing	(France) Bastien Brière (Japan) Shinji Nakano (Germany) Jens Petersen	Oreca 03	D	325	+53 Laps
24	LMP2	45	(Belgium) Boutsen Ginion Racing	(France) Bastien Brière (Japan) Shinji Nakano (Germany) Jens Petersen	Nissan VK45DE 4.5 L V8	D	325	+53 Laps
25	LMGTE; Am	57	(United States) Krohn Racing	(United States) Tracy Krohn (Sweden) Niclas Jönsson (Italy) Michele Rugolo	Ferrari 458 Italia GT2	D	323	+55 Laps
25	LMGTE; Am	57	(United States) Krohn Racing	(United States) Tracy Krohn (Sweden) Niclas Jönsson (Italy) Michele Rugolo	Ferrari F136 4.5 L V8	D	323	+55 Laps
26	LMP2	40	(Switzerland) Race Performance	(Switzerland) Michel Frey (Switzerland) Jonathan Hirschi (Switzerland) Ralph Meichtry	Oreca 03	D	320	+58 Laps
26	LMP2	40	(Switzerland) Race Performance	(Switzerland) Michel Frey (Switzerland) Jonathan Hirschi (Switzerland) Ralph Meichtry	Judd HK 3.6 L V8	D	320	+58 Laps
27	LMGTE; Am	79	(United States) Flying Lizard Motorsports	(United States) Seth Neiman (United States) Spencer Pumpelly (France) Patrick Pilet	Porsche 997 GT3-RSR	M	313	+65 Laps
27	LMGTE; Am	79	(United States) Flying Lizard Motorsports	(United States) Seth Neiman (United States) Spencer Pumpelly (France) Patrick Pilet	Porsche M97/74 4.0 L Flat-6	M	313	+65 Laps
28	LMGTE; Am	70	(France) Larbre Compétition	(France) Christophe Bourret (France) Pascal Gibon (France) Jean-Philippe Belloc	Chevrolet Corvette C6.R	M	309	+69 Laps
28	LMGTE; Am	70	(France) Larbre Compétition	(France) Christophe Bourret (France) Pascal Gibon (France) Jean-Philippe Belloc	Chevrolet LS5.5R 5.5 L V8	M	309	+69 Laps
29	LMP2	43	(France) Extrême Limite ARIC	(France) Fabien Rosier (France) Philippe Haezebrouck (France) Philippe Thirion	Norma MP200P	D	308	+70 Laps
29	LMP2	43	(France) Extrême Limite ARIC	(France) Fabien Rosier (France) Philippe Haezebrouck (France) Philippe Thirion	Judd HK 3.6 L V8	D	308	+70 Laps
30	LMP1	21	(United Kingdom) Strakka Racing	(United Kingdom) Nick Leventis (United Kingdom) Jonny Kane (United Kingdom) Danny Watts	HPD ARX-03a	M	303	+75 Laps
30	LMP1	21	(United Kingdom) Strakka Racing	(United Kingdom) Nick Leventis (United Kingdom) Jonny Kane (United Kingdom) Danny Watts	Honda LM-V8 3.4 L V8	M	303	+75 Laps
31	LMGTE; Am	61	(Italy) AF Corse-Waltrip	(United States) Robert Kauffman (United States) Brian Vickers (Portugal) Rui Águas	Ferrari 458 Italia GT2	M	294	+84 Laps
31	LMGTE; Am	61	(Italy) AF Corse-Waltrip	(United States) Robert Kauffman (United States) Brian Vickers (Portugal) Rui Águas	Ferrari F136 4.5 L V8	M	294	+84 Laps
32	LMGTE; Am	83	(Monaco) JMB Racing	(Portugal) Manuel Rodrigues (France) Philippe Illiano (France) Alain Ferté	Ferrari 458 Italia GT2	M	292	+86 Laps
32	LMGTE; Am	83	(Monaco) JMB Racing	(Portugal) Manuel Rodrigues (France) Philippe Illiano (France) Alain Ferté	Ferrari F136 4.5 L V8	M	292	+86 Laps
33	LMGTE; Am	55	(United Kingdom) JWA-Avila	(United Kingdom) Paul Daniels (Switzerland) Joël Camathias (Finland) Markus Palttala	Porsche 997 GT3-RSR	P	290	+88 Laps
33	LMGTE; Am	55	(United Kingdom) JWA-Avila	(United Kingdom) Paul Daniels (Switzerland) Joël Camathias (Finland) Markus Palttala	Porsche M97/74 4.0 L Flat-6	P	290	+88 Laps
NC	LMGTE; Pro	74	(United States) Corvette Racing	(United Kingdom) Oliver Gavin (United Kingdom) Richard Westbrook (United States) Tommy Milner	Chevrolet Corvette C6.R	M	215	Insufficient distance
NC	LMGTE; Pro	74	(United States) Corvette Racing	(United Kingdom) Oliver Gavin (United Kingdom) Richard Westbrook (United States) Tommy Milner	Chevrolet LS5.5R 5.5 L V8	M	215	Insufficient distance
NC	LMP1	17	(France) Pescarolo Team	(France) Nicolas Minassian (France) Sébastien Bourdais (Japan) Seiji Ara	Dome S102.5	M	203	Insufficient distance
NC	LMP1	17	(France) Pescarolo Team	(France) Nicolas Minassian (France) Sébastien Bourdais (Japan) Seiji Ara	Judd DB 3.4 L V8	M	203	Insufficient distance
DNF	LMP2	38	(United Kingdom) Jota	(United Kingdom) Sam Hancock (United Kingdom) Simon Dolan (Japan) Haruki Kurosawa	Zytek Z11SN	D	271	Accident
DNF	LMP2	38	(United Kingdom) Jota	(United Kingdom) Sam Hancock (United Kingdom) Simon Dolan (Japan) Haruki Kurosawa	Nissan VK45DE 4.5 L V8	D	271	Accident
DNF	LMP2	33	(United States) Level 5 Motorsports	(United States) Scott Tucker (France) Christophe Bouchut (Mexico) Luis Díaz	HPD ARX-03b	D	240	Fuel
DNF	LMP2	33	(United States) Level 5 Motorsports	(United States) Scott Tucker (France) Christophe Bouchut (Mexico) Luis Díaz	Honda HR28TT 2.8 L Turbo V6	D	240	Fuel
DNF	LMP2	30	(Republic of Ireland) Status Grand Prix	(United Kingdom) Alexander Sims (Netherlands) Yelmer Buurman (France) Romain Iannetta	Lola B12/80	D	239	Retired
DNF	LMP2	30	(Republic of Ireland) Status Grand Prix	(United Kingdom) Alexander Sims (Netherlands) Yelmer Buurman (France) Romain Iannetta	Judd HK 3.6 L V8	D	239	Retired
DNF	LMGTE; Am	88	(Germany) Team Felbermayr-Proton	(Germany) Christian Ried (Italy) Gianluca Roda (Italy) Paolo Ruberti	Porsche 997 GT3-RSR	M	222	Retired
DNF	LMGTE; Am	88	(Germany) Team Felbermayr-Proton	(Germany) Christian Ried (Italy) Gianluca Roda (Italy) Paolo Ruberti	Porsche M97/74 4.0 L Flat-6	M	222	Retired
DNF	LMP1	15	(France) OAK Racing	(France) Franck Montagny (Austria) Dominik Kraihamer (Belgium) Bertrand Baguette	OAK Pescarolo 01	D	219	Engine
DNF	LMP1	15	(France) OAK Racing	(France) Franck Montagny (Austria) Dominik Kraihamer (Belgium) Bertrand Baguette	Judd DB 3.4 L V8	D	219	Engine
DNF	LMGTE; Pro	66	(United Kingdom) JMW Motorsport	(United Kingdom) Jonny Cocker (United Kingdom) James Walker (New Zealand) Roger Wills	Ferrari 458 Italia GT2	D	204	Retired
DNF	LMGTE; Pro	66	(United Kingdom) JMW Motorsport	(United Kingdom) Jonny Cocker (United Kingdom) James Walker (New Zealand) Roger Wills	Ferrari F136 4.5 L V8	D	204	Retired
DNF	LMP2	48	(Republic of Ireland) Murphy Prototypes	(United Kingdom) Jody Firth (United Kingdom) Warren Hughes (New Zealand) Brendon Hartley	Oreca 03	D	196	Suspension/Accident
DNF	LMP2	48	(Republic of Ireland) Murphy Prototypes	(United Kingdom) Jody Firth (United Kingdom) Warren Hughes (New Zealand) Brendon Hartley	Nissan VK45DE 4.5 L V8	D	196	Suspension/Accident
DNF	LMGTE; Pro	77	(Germany) Team Felbermayr-Proton	(Austria) Richard Lietz (Germany) Marc Lieb (Germany) Wolf Henzler	Porsche 997 GT3-RSR	M	185	Retired
DNF	LMGTE; Pro	77	(Germany) Team Felbermayr-Proton	(Austria) Richard Lietz (Germany) Marc Lieb (Germany) Wolf Henzler	Porsche M97/74 4.0 L Flat-6	M	185	Retired
DNF	LMGTE; Am	75	(Belgium) Prospeed Competition	(Saudi Arabia) Abdulaziz Al-Faisal (United States) Bret Curtis (United Kingdom) Sean Edwards	Porsche 997 GT3-RSR	M	180	Accident
DNF	LMGTE; Am	75	(Belgium) Prospeed Competition	(Saudi Arabia) Abdulaziz Al-Faisal (United States) Bret Curtis (United Kingdom) Sean Edwards	Porsche M97/74 4.0 L Flat-6	M	180	Accident
DNF	LMP2	31	(Germany) Lotus	(Germany) Thomas Holzer (Germany) Mirco Schultis (Italy) Luca Moro	Lola B12/80	D	155	Gearbox
DNF	LMP2	31	(Germany) Lotus	(Germany) Thomas Holzer (Germany) Mirco Schultis (Italy) Luca Moro	Lotus HK 3.6 L V8	D	155	Gearbox
DNF	LMGTE; Am	58	(France) Luxury Racing	(Germany) Pierre Ehret (United States) Gunnar Jeannette (United States) Frankie Montecalvo	Ferrari 458 Italia GT2	M	146	Accident damage
DNF	LMGTE; Am	58	(France) Luxury Racing	(Germany) Pierre Ehret (United States) Gunnar Jeannette (United States) Frankie Montecalvo	Ferrari F136 4.5 L V8	M	146	Accident damage
DNF	LMP2	24	(France) OAK Racing	(France) Jacques Nicolet (France) Matthieu Lahaye (France) Olivier Pla	Morgan LMP2	D	139	Oil pump
DNF	LMP2	24	(France) OAK Racing	(France) Jacques Nicolet (France) Matthieu Lahaye (France) Olivier Pla	Judd HK 3.6 L V8	D	139	Oil pump
DNF	LMP1	7	(Japan) Toyota Racing	(Austria) Alexander Wurz (Japan) Kazuki Nakajima (France) Nicolas Lapierre	Toyota TS030 Hybrid	M	134	Engine
DNF	LMP1	7	(Japan) Toyota Racing	(Austria) Alexander Wurz (Japan) Kazuki Nakajima (France) Nicolas Lapierre	Toyota RV8KLM 3.4 L V8 (Hybrid)	M	134	Engine
DNF	LMGTE; Pro	80	(United States) Flying Lizard Motorsports	(Germany) Jörg Bergmeister (Germany) Marco Holzer (United States) Patrick Long	Porsche 997 GT3-RSR	M	114	Accident damage
DNF	LMGTE; Pro	80	(United States) Flying Lizard Motorsports	(Germany) Jörg Bergmeister (Germany) Marco Holzer (United States) Patrick Long	Porsche M97/74 4.0 L Flat-6	M	114	Accident damage
DNF	LMP2	28	(United Arab Emirates) Gulf Racing Middle East	(France) Fabien Giroix (France) Ludovic Badey (Sweden) Stefan Johansson	Lola B12/80	D	92	Accident
DNF	LMP2	28	(United Arab Emirates) Gulf Racing Middle East	(France) Fabien Giroix (France) Ludovic Badey (Sweden) Stefan Johansson	Nissan VK45DE 4.5 L V8	D	92	Accident
DNF	LMP1	8	(Japan) Toyota Racing	(United Kingdom) Anthony Davidson (Switzerland) Sébastien Buemi (France) Stéphane Sarrazin	Toyota TS030 Hybrid	M	82	Accident
DNF	LMP1	8	(Japan) Toyota Racing	(United Kingdom) Anthony Davidson (Switzerland) Sébastien Buemi (France) Stéphane Sarrazin	Toyota RV8KLM 3.4 L V8 (Hybrid)	M	82	Accident
DNF	CDNT	0	(United States) Highcroft Racing	(United Kingdom) Marino Franchitti (Germany) Michael Krumm (Japan) Satoshi Motoyama	DeltaWing	M	75	Accident
DNF	CDNT	0	(United States) Highcroft Racing	(United Kingdom) Marino Franchitti (Germany) Michael Krumm (Japan) Satoshi Motoyama	Nissan 1.6 L Turbo I4	M	75	Accident
DNF	LMGTE; Am	81	(Italy) AF Corse	(Italy) Piergiuseppe Perazzini (Italy) Niki Cadei (Republic of Ireland) Matt Griffin	Ferrari 458 Italia GT2	M	70	Accident
DNF	LMGTE; Am	81	(Italy) AF Corse	(Italy) Piergiuseppe Perazzini (Italy) Niki Cadei (Republic of Ireland) Matt Griffin	Ferrari F136 4.5 L V8	M	70	Accident
DNF	LMGTE; Am	99	(United Kingdom) Aston Martin Racing	(Denmark) Christoffer Nygaard (Denmark) Kristian Poulsen (Denmark) Allan Simonsen	Aston Martin Vantage GTE	M	31	Accident damage
DNF	LMGTE; Am	99	(United Kingdom) Aston Martin Racing	(Denmark) Christoffer Nygaard (Denmark) Kristian Poulsen (Denmark) Allan Simonsen	Aston Martin AM05 4.5 L V8	M	31	Accident damage
DNF	LMP1	16	(France) Pescarolo Team	(France) Emmanuel Collard (United Kingdom) Stuart Hall	Pescarolo 03	M	20	Power steering
DNF	LMP1	16	(France) Pescarolo Team	(France) Emmanuel Collard (United Kingdom) Stuart Hall	Judd DB 3.4 L V8	M	20	Power steering
DNF	LMP2	29	(United Arab Emirates) Gulf Racing Middle East	(Japan) Keiko Ihara (Switzerland) Jean-Denis Delétraz (France) Marc Rostan	Lola B12/80	D	17	Accident
DNF	LMP2	29	(United Arab Emirates) Gulf Racing Middle East	(Japan) Keiko Ihara (Switzerland) Jean-Denis Delétraz (France) Marc Rostan	Nissan VK45DE 4.5 L V8	D	17	Accident

Tyre manufacturers
Key
Symbol	Tyre manufacturer
**D**	Dunlop
**M**	Michelin
**P**	Pirelli

== Championship standings after the race ==
World Endurance Drivers' Championship standings
Pos.	+/–	Driver	Points
1	1	(United Kingdom) Allan McNish (Denmark) Tom Kristensen (Italy) Rinaldo Capello	77
2	2	(Germany) André Lotterer (France) Benoît Tréluyer (Switzerland) Marcel Fässler	70.5
3	2	(France) Romain Dumas (France) Loïc Duval	67
4	1	(Spain) Marc Gené	49
5	3	(Germany) Nick Heidfeld (Switzerland) Neel Jani (France) Nico Prost	42.5

World Endurance Manufacturers' Championship standings
Pos.	+/–	Constructor	Points
1		(Germany) Audi	103
2		(Japan) Toyota	0

- Note: Only the top five positions are included for the Drivers' Championship standings.

FIA World Endurance Championship
Previous race: 6 Hours of Spa-Francorchamps	2012 season	Next race: 6 Hours of Silverstone
