= Pescarolo 03 =

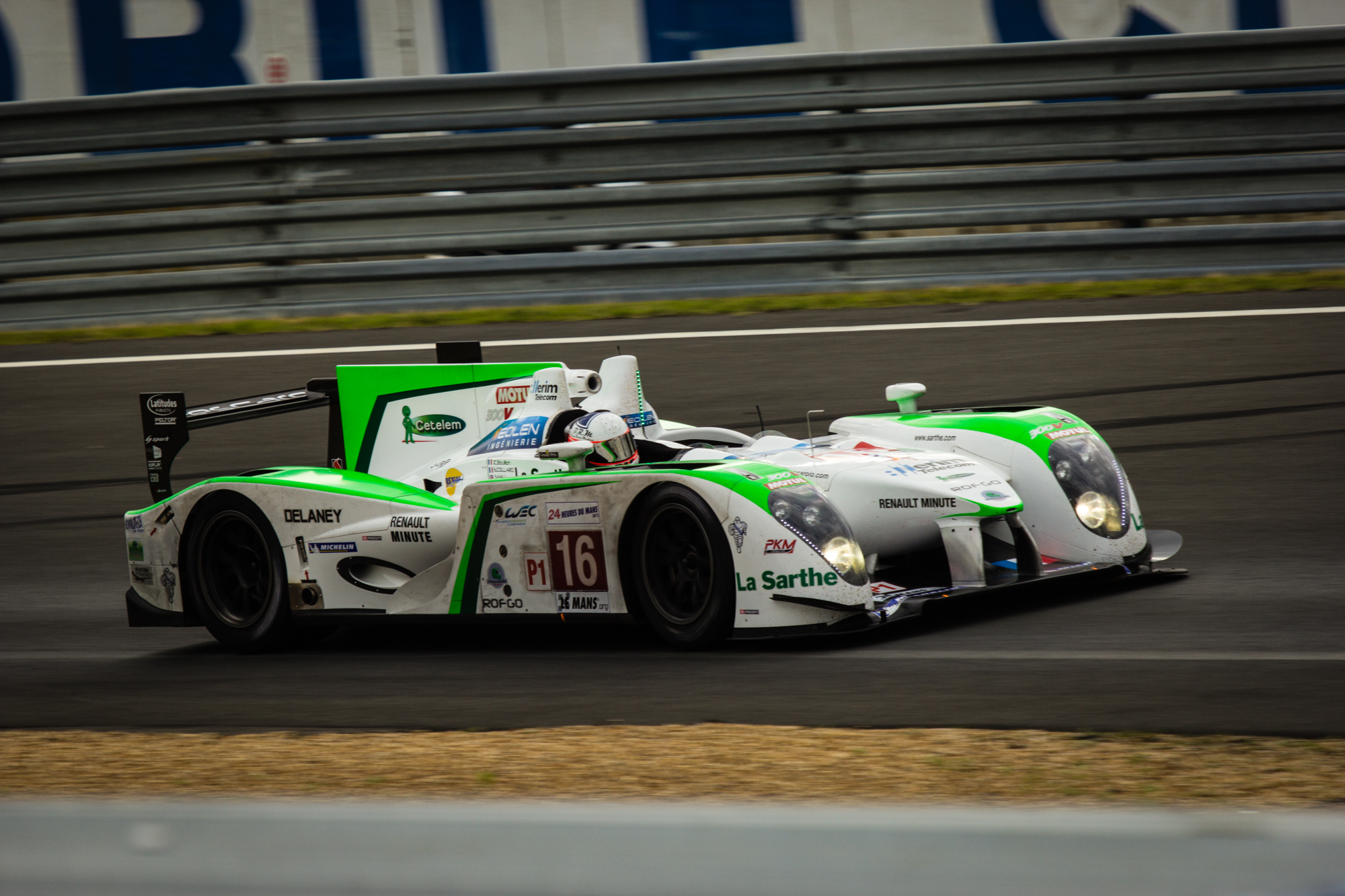
- #16 Pescarolo 03-Judd 2012 24 Hours of Le Mans
- Category: Le Mans Prototype LMP1
- Constructor: Pescarolo Sport (Perrin)
- Designer(s): Nicolas Perrin
- Predecessor: Pescarolo 01

Technical specifications
- Chassis: Carbon fibre monocoque
- Suspension (front): Double wishbone with push rod Koni dampers, 3rd spring/damper, front ARB
- Suspension (rear): Double wishbone with adjustable Koni dampers and 3rd spring/damper
- Length: 4,645 mm (182.9 in)
- Width: 1,998 mm (78.7 in)
- Wheelbase: 2,930 mm (115.4 in)
- Engine: Judd DB 3,397 cc (207.3 cu in) V8, Natural Aspirated, mid-engined, longitudinally mounted
- Transmission: Xtrac 6-speed sequential manual
- Power: appr. 520 bhp (390 kW)
- Weight: Appr. 900 kg (2,000 lb)
- Tyres: Michelin

Competition history
- Notable entrants: (France) Pescarolo Sport
- Notable drivers: (France) Jean-Christophe Boullion (United Kingdom) Stuart Hall (France) Emmanuel Collard
- Debut: 2012 24 Hours of Le Mans
Races	Wins	Poles	F/Laps
2	0	0	0

The Pescarolo 03 is a sports prototype racing car built and designed by French team Pescarolo Team. It is designed to meet the LMP1 regulations of 2012, and act as a successor to the Pescarolo 01, with the design including a Mandatory Shark-Fin, along with air extractor holes located in the wheel arches. The car was built around the carbon tub of the abandoned Aston Martin AMR-One LMP1 design, which had competed in the 2011 24 Hours of Le Mans. The car made its debut at the 2012 24 Hours of Le Mans.

== Development ==
It was announced on ahead of the 2012 FIA World Endurance Championship, that Henri Pescarolo had acquired 2 new Aston Martin AMR-One chassis, with the intent of using the car's carbon fibre tub as the basis of his new design, the Pescarolo 03. The car would replace the aging Pescarolo 01 chassis which was nearly 5 years old. It was later announced that the car would be a joint collaboration between Luxury Racing and Pescarolo Team. The car had been set to debut at the 2012 6 Hours of Spa-Francorchamps, but was delayed due to financial problems, with the planned alliance between Pescarolo Team and Luxury Racing falling apart, leading to sports car collector Roald Goethe supporting the project financially. When the car made its debut at the 2012 24 Hours of Le Mans, the car was shown to have a number of similarities with the AMR-One, with a largely similar engine installation, while a number of control electronics were carried over, such as the steering wheel and the driver control panel.
