= Pescarolo Sport =

2000-2012 racing team

- Founded: February 2000 in Le Mans, France
- Founder(s): Henri Pescarolo; François Granet
- Website: www.pescarolo-sport.com

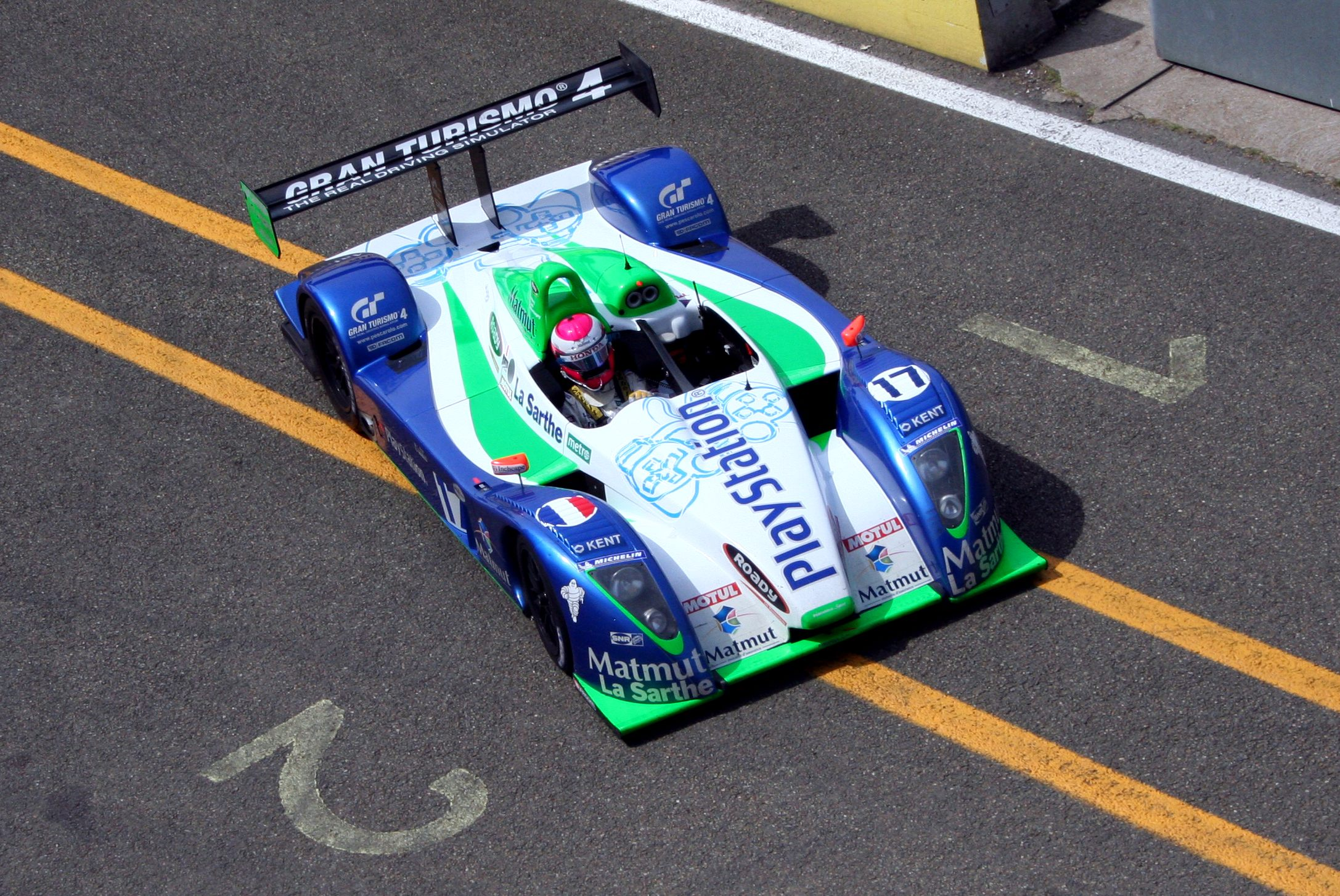
Franck Montagny driving the PlayStation Pescarolo C60 during practice for the 2006 24 Hours of Le Mans

Pescarolo Sport was a motorsport team based in Le Mans, France, and founded in February 2000 by French racing driver Henri Pescarolo and his friend and partner, French publisher François Granet. They raced in the Le Mans Series and the 24 Hours of Le Mans. In October 2007, Henri Pescarolo purchased Jacques Nicolet's Saulnier Racing and created Pescarolo Automobiles, with the racing team becoming a division of the new company. The Pescarolo Automobiles went into receivership on 15 June 2010. Following a liquidation sale, the company was resold back to Henri Pescarolo and rebranded as Pescarolo Team for the 2011 season. However, the team's financial situation did not improve, and was wound up in January 2013.

== Racing history ==
Although Henri Pescarolo had been racing, and winning, at Le Mans for many decades, he had always been driving for other teams. From 1994 to 1998, Pescarolo had been driving for the Courage Compétition squad with some success, but decided in 1999 that he would like to run his own team for the 24 Hours of Le Mans, although he would remain connected to Courage and would be a customer team of the factory's chassis. The team was initially known as the Pescarolo Promotion Racing Team, and would take a well-deserved ninth-place finish.

Following this success, Pescarolo decided that he would retire from racing as a driver, but remain in sports car racing as a team owner. On 1 January 2000 Pescarolo Sport was founded in the town of Le Mans, within the grounds of the Circuit de la Sarthe and near Courage Compétition's headquarters. Pescarolo remained close to Courage, using their C52 chassis (in fact a rebranded 1997 C41 chassis), as well as reaching an agreement with Peugeot to supply new turbocharged engines. The team initially concentrated on the Le Mans 24 Hours, although they would also make an appearance at the American Le Mans Series event at Silverstone Circuit. In their first run at Le Mans, the team managed an impressive fourth-place finish for drivers Sébastien Bourdais, Olivier Grouillard, and Emmanuel Clerico, made even more impressive by the fact that the top three finishers were all from the factory Audi team.

With this success, Pescarolo Sport expanded vastly for the 2001 season, purchasing two new Courage C60 chassis (chassis numbers 03 and 04) for use in various races of the American Le Mans Series, European Le Mans Series, FIA Sportscar Championship, as well as the usual entry at Le Mans. The team saw their worst effort ever at Le Mans, with only a single car managing to finish in a distant 13th place. However this trouble was soon reversed in July of that year, when Pescarolo recorded their first win at the 1000km of Estoril, followed two weeks later by a win in front of a home crowd at Magny-Cours for the FIA Sportscar Championship, beating the likes of Ferrari 333 SP, Dome-Judd S101 and Ascari-Judd A410.

For the 2002 season, Pescarolo Sport, with the additional help of designer André de Cortanze who joined the team in Autumn 2001, settled on running a full season of the FIA Sportscar Championship, and were able to continue on from their first two wins. The team took two more victories over the course of the season, clinching second place in the teams championship behind Racing for Holland. At Le Mans though, the team did not improve much, recording only a tenth-place finish for their only finishing car.

Moving to 2003, the team suffered major difficulties. Running in the FIA Sportscar Championship again, the team started the season with a win, but suffered three straight failures to finish in the following races. Although they would win once more, the team had to settle for once again being a runner-up to Racing for Holland in the teams championship. Le Mans saw some improvement, with both car finishing and taking eighth and ninth place, however Pescarolo began to suffer financial woes. Even though the team managed to take second place at the unique 1000km of Le Mans at the end of the year, Peugeot announced their discontinuation of supplying engines to the team, also leading to the loss of sponsorship money.

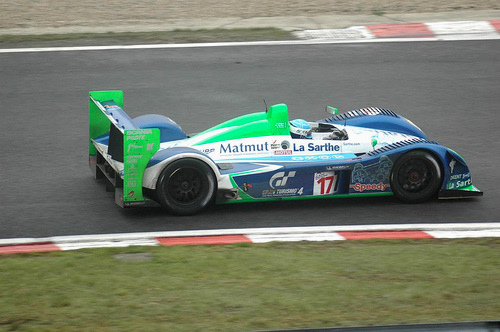
Pescarolo Sport en route to a second-place finish at the 2005 1000km of Spa

With the aid of investment from Sony and promotion of their PlayStation 2 as well as Gran Turismo 4, Pescarolo were able to find the money to purchase new Judd GV5 V10s, as well beginning their first work in engineering. Feeling the Courage C60s were not perfect, Pescarolo Sport began development of new bodywork and mechanical elements in order to increase the cars performance. For the 2004 season the cars were renamed as Pescarolo C60s, due to the vast differences between them at standard Courage produced cars.

Although still strapped for cash, the team began a one car effort in the new Le Mans Endurance Series due to the FIA Sportscar Championship folding at the end of 2003. Managing to earn points in the first two races of the season, the team finished the year tied for sixth in the championship. At Le Mans however, the team managed to regain some of their past success, with their sole finishing car taking fourth place behind a trio of Audis but also finishing ahead of a fourth Audi.

2005 saw Pescarolo improve rapidly, with the team winning two rounds of the Le Mans Endurance Series season. These wins helped Pescarolo Sport earn their first championship, earning it by a mere two points. This success continued at Le Mans, with Pescarolo earning their best finish ever, a second place behind an Audi, separated by a just two laps, and also making the fastest lap of the race. Pescarolo had been backed heavily to cause an upset and trump the dominant Audis, especially after taking pole position.

Pescarolo Sport finally become a dominant, front-running team in 2006. In the Le Mans Series, Pescarolo out performed the competition and were able to sweep the entire season, winning all five races and easily defending their championship title. At Le Mans, the team also repeated their previous success by taking another second place, this time behind the new works Audi R10 diesel, although the team did manage to finish ahead of the other R10.

=== Pescarolo 01 ===
Following the end of the 2006 season, Pescarolo Sport announced their plans to develop their own, all-new chassis for 2007 in order to comply with new Le Mans Prototype regulations. The new cars, known as Pescarolo 01s, would use a brand-new chassis and bodywork evolved from the previous Pescarolo C60s. However, for the first time, Pescarolo would become a supplier, offering the 01s for sale to customer teams not only in the top LMP1 class, but also in the smaller LMP2 class.

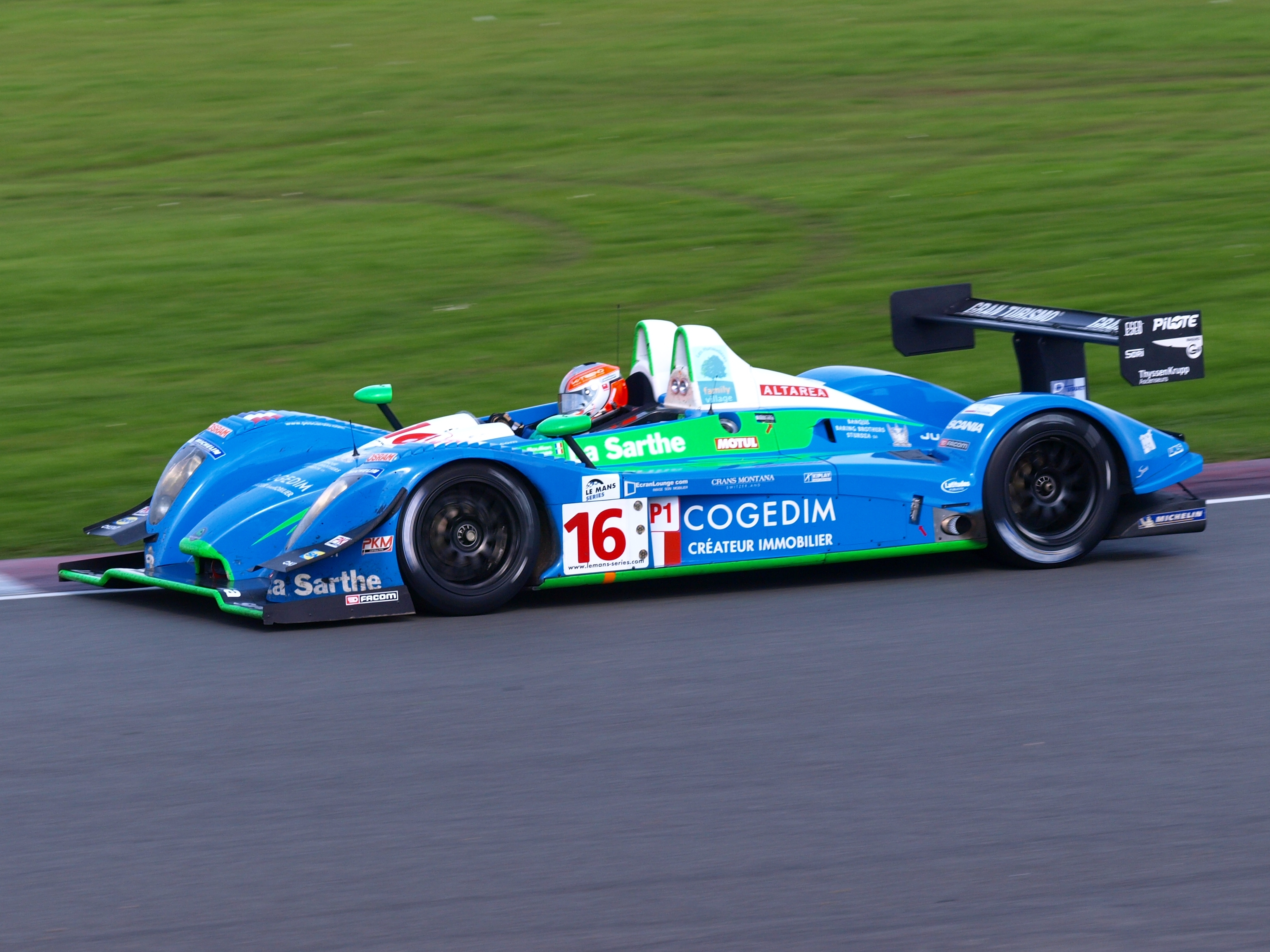
A Pescarolo 01-Judd used by Pescarolo Sport in the Le Mans Series

Following on from two for Pescarolo Sport, 01s were supplied to Rollcentre Racing and Kruse Motorsport for use in the Le Mans Series season. Pescarolo ran alongside their customers, for the first time running a two car effort for a full season. Pescarolo used a new paint scheme, reminiscent of the Matra-Simcas that Henri Pescarolo ran at Le Mans in the 1970s, by being predominantly blue with red or yellow noses.

At the 2007 24 Hours of Le Mans, Pescarolo's chassis would perform near the top for most of the race. One of Pescarolo Sport's own cars managed to finish on the overall podium behind the diesel Audi and Peugeot, while the customer Rollcentre Pescarolo finished fourth, marking the best finishes by petrol powered cars in the race.

Pescarolo Sport ended the 2007 in second place in the LMP1 standings, behind one Peugeot 908 HDi FAP but ahead of the other, while Rollcentre Racing took fourth. The Kruse LMP2 on the other hand would be unable to complete the season as the car was destroyed in a fire.

=== 2009 to 2012 ===
Pescarolo Sport was 100% sold to Sora Composites in late 2008. The team upgraded the 01 for the 2009 ELMS season where it entered two cars. For the 2009 24 Hours of Le Mans, Pescarolo Sport announced that one of the cars Pescarolo would run in the race would be a diesel-powered Peugeot 908 HDi FAP loaned from Peugeot itself; they would run it in the 24-hour race alongside its Pescarolo-Judd original vehicle. The Peugeot's crash during the race caused financial problems the team. The team, entered under the name Sora Racing, won the 2009 Asian Le Mans Series by with a race win and a second-place finish.

Pescarolo Sport and Sora Racing were granted one entry each for the 2010 24 Hours of Le Mans with a plan to use Gravity drivers. Gravity Sports Management and Genii Capital pulled out in April and the 2 entries were officially withdrawn in early May. When Pescarolo Sport liquidated its assets in October, Jacques Nicolet and Joël Rivière bought all 7 lots and announced they would make them available to Henri Pescarolo.

Pescarolo Team entered one car for the 2011 Le Mans Series where it won its comeback race and the year's final race and carried its two full season drivers to the championship. The car was run in grandfathered form with its 5-liter V10 restricted to 3.4L V8 power levels. It ran alongside 4 other Pescarolo 01 run by Oak Racing at Le Mans.

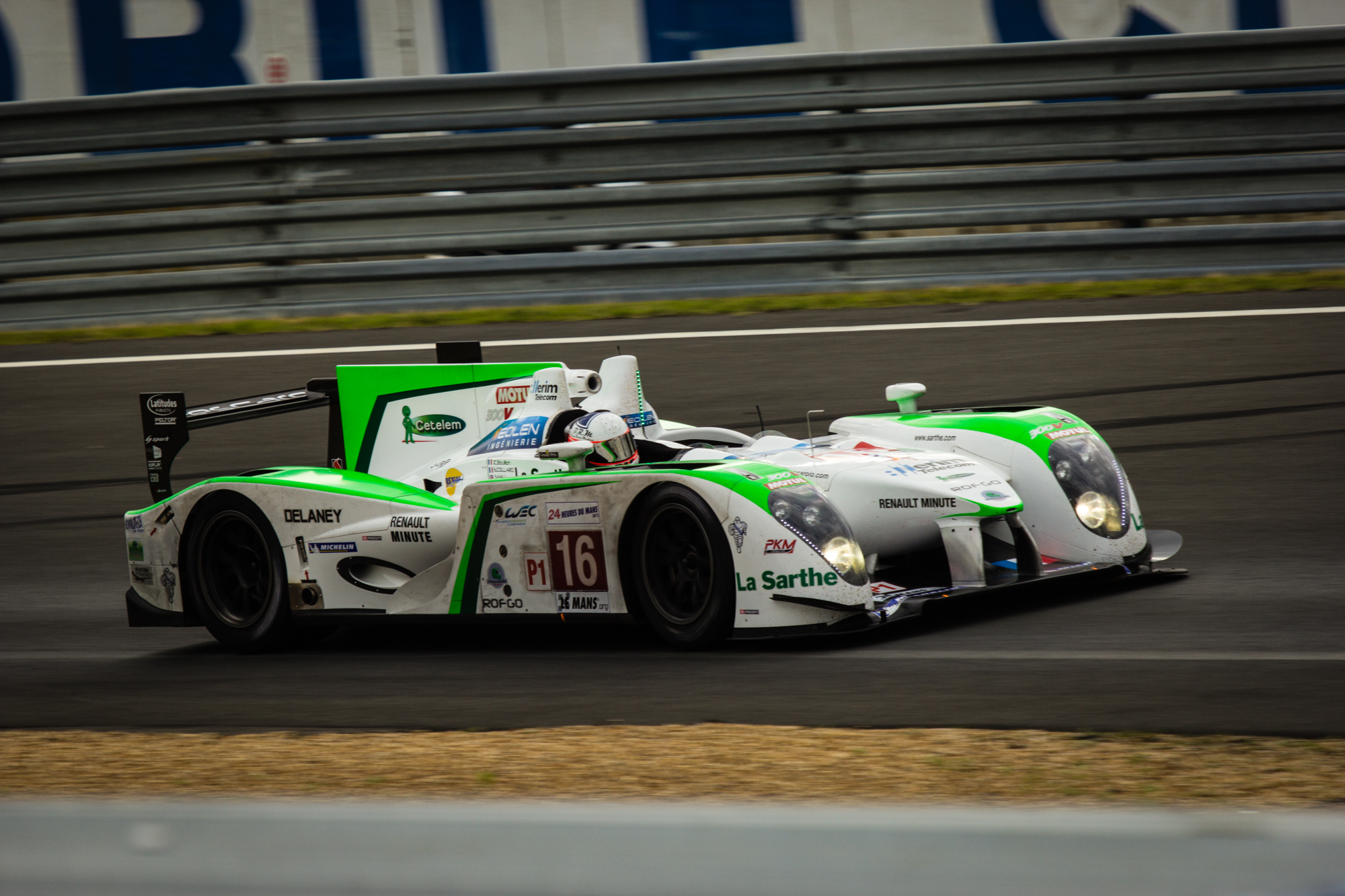
Pescarolo 03 at Le Mans 2012

The Pescarolo 01 was also entered one last time at the 2012 12 Hours of Sebring as part of a planned entry in the World Endurance Championship with a new car based upon the ill-fated Aston Martin AMR-One project. The new car would be designated the Pescarolo 03 and built around the tub of the AMR-One, of which they took delivery of two. The car was entered in the 2012 24 Hours of Le Mans race in the LMP1 class as the #16 Pescarolo 03, but retired within the first two hours of the race due to mechanical issues. Pescarolo Team also entered the #17 Dome S102.5. The car finished the race but was not classified in the results due to being too far down from the winning Audi R18.

Pescarolo Team had run into financial difficulties because the funds from the backer behind Luxury Racing never materialised and Henri Pescarolo was forced to lay off much of his team. The team was liquidated in early 2013.

=== Subsequent Pescarolo Sport iterations ===
Sora Composites built the Pescarolo 02 prototype from 2009 for the Automobile Club de l'Ouest's driving school at the Bugatti circuit. In 2014, a closed version of the car was announced for the LMP3 class. On 19 May 2016 Jocelyn Pedrono, took over Pescarolo Sport and announced they would build a closed-top Pescarolo 04 for a purported LMP4 class. These successive iterations used the Pescarolo Sport name even though they were unrelated to Henri Pescarolo.

In February 2023, Peugeot announced Pescarolo Sport would run a Peugeot 9X8 in 2024. However, when the 2024 World Endurance Championship season began, the team never appeared in the opening round at Qatar, and Peugeot later updated their 9X8 by adding a rear wing before their next race at Imola a month later.

== Racing record ==
=== 24 Hours of Le Mans results ===
Year	Entrant	No.	Car	Drivers	Class	Laps	Pos.	Class Pos.
1999	(France) La Filière Elf (France) Pescarolo Promotion Racing	14	Courage C50-Porsche	(France) Michel Ferté (France) Patrice Gay (France) Henri Pescarolo	LMP900	328	9th	8th
2000	(France) Pescarolo Sport	16	Courage C52-Peugeot	(France) Sébastien Bourdais (France) Emmanuel Clérico (France) Olivier Grouillard	LMP900	344	4th	4th
2001	(France) Pescarolo Sport	17	Courage C60-Peugeot	(France) Jean-Christophe Boullion (France) Sébastien Bourdais (France) Laurent Rédon	LMP900	271	13th	4th
2001	(France) Pescarolo Sport	18	Courage C60-Peugeot	(France) Emmanuel Clérico (France) Didier Cottaz (France) Boris Derichebourg	LMP900	42	DNF	DNF
2002	(France) Pescarolo Sport	17	Courage C60-Peugeot	(France) Jean-Christophe Boullion (France) Sébastien Bourdais (France) Franck Lagorce	LMP900	343	10th	9th
2002	(France) Pescarolo Sport	18	Courage C60-Peugeot	(France) Éric Hélary (Japan) Ukyo Katayama (Monaco) Stéphane Ortelli	LMP900	144	DNF	DNF
2003	(France) Pescarolo Sport	17	Courage C60-Peugeot	(France) Jean-Christophe Boullion (France) Franck Lagorce (France) Stéphane Sarrazin	LMP900	356	8th	6th
2003	(France) Pescarolo Sport	18	Courage C60-Peugeot	(France) Soheil Ayari (France) Éric Hélary (France) Nicolas Minassian	LMP900	352	9th	7th
2004	(France) Pescarolo Sport	17	Pescarolo C60-Judd	(France) Sébastien Bourdais (France) Emmanuel Collard (France) Nicolas Minassian	LMP1	282	DNF	DNF
2004	(France) Pescarolo Sport	18	Pescarolo C60-Judd	(France) Soheil Ayari (France) Érik Comas (France) Benoît Tréluyer	LMP1	361	4th	4th
2005	(France) Pescarolo Sport	16	Pescarolo C60 Hybrid-Judd	(France) Jean-Christophe Boullion (France) Emmanuel Collard (France) Érik Comas	LMP1	368	2nd	2nd
2005	(France) Pescarolo Sport	17	Pescarolo C60 Hybrid-Judd	(France) Soheil Ayari (France) Éric Hélary (France) Sébastien Loeb	LMP1	288	DNF	DNF
2006	(France) Pescarolo Sport	16	Pescarolo C60 Hybrid-Judd	(France) Emmanuel Collard (France) Érik Comas (France) Nicolas Minassian	LMP1	352	5th	4th
2006	(France) Pescarolo Sport	17	Pescarolo C60 Hybrid-Judd	(France) Éric Hélary (France) Sébastien Loeb (France) Franck Montagny	LMP1	376	2nd	2nd
2007	(France) Pescarolo Sport	16	Pescarolo 01-Judd	(France) Jean-Christophe Boullion (France) Emmanuel Collard (France) Romain Dumas	LMP1	358	3rd	3rd
2007	(France) Pescarolo Sport	17	Pescarolo 01-Judd	(Switzerland) Harold Primat (France) Christophe Tinseau (France) Benoît Tréluyer	LMP1	325	13th	6th
2008	(France) Pescarolo Sport	16	Pescarolo 01-Judd	(France) Jean-Christophe Boullion (France) Emmanuel Collard (France) Romain Dumas	LMP1	238	DNF	DNF
2008	(France) Pescarolo Sport	17	Pescarolo 01-Judd	(Switzerland) Harold Primat (France) Christophe Tinseau (France) Benoît Tréluyer	LMP1	362	7th	7th
2009	(France) Pescarolo Sport	16	Pescarolo 01-Judd	(Portugal) João Barbosa (France) Bruce Jouanny (France) Christophe Tinseau	LMP1	368	8th	8th
2009	(France) Pescarolo Sport	17	Peugeot 908 HDi FAP	(France) Jean-Christophe Boullion (France) Simon Pagenaud (France) Benoît Tréluyer	LMP1	210	DNF	DNF
2011	(France) Pescarolo Team	16	Pescarolo 01-Judd	(France) Emmanuel Collard (France) Julien Jousse (France) Christophe Tinseau	LMP1	305	DNF	DNF
2012	(France) Pescarolo Team	16	Pescarolo 03-Judd	(France) Emmanuel Collard (United Kingdom) Stuart Hall	LMP1	20	DNF	DNF
2012	(France) Pescarolo Team	17	Dome S102.5-Judd	(Japan) Seiji Ara (France) Sébastien Bourdais (France) Nicolas Minassian	LMP1	203	NC	NC
