= Luxury Racing =

Motor racing team from France

(France) Luxury Racing
- Founded: 2009
- Team principal(s): Eric Adam (team manager)
- Current series: European Le Mans Series; FIA World Endurance Championship; Ferrari Challenge
- Former series: Porsche Carrera Cup France; International GT Open; Intercontinental Le Mans Cup
- Noted drivers: (France) Frédéric Makowiecki (Brazil) Jaime Melo (Germany) Dominik Farnbacher (Germany) Pierre Ehret (United States) Gunnar Jeannette (United States) Frankie Montecalvo
- Drivers' Championships: Porsche Carrera Cup (2010)

Luxury Racing is a motor racing team from France that formed in 2009. The team specialises in endurance racing, more specifically the FIA World Endurance Championship and has solely used Ferraris since 2011.

== History ==
=== 2011 ===
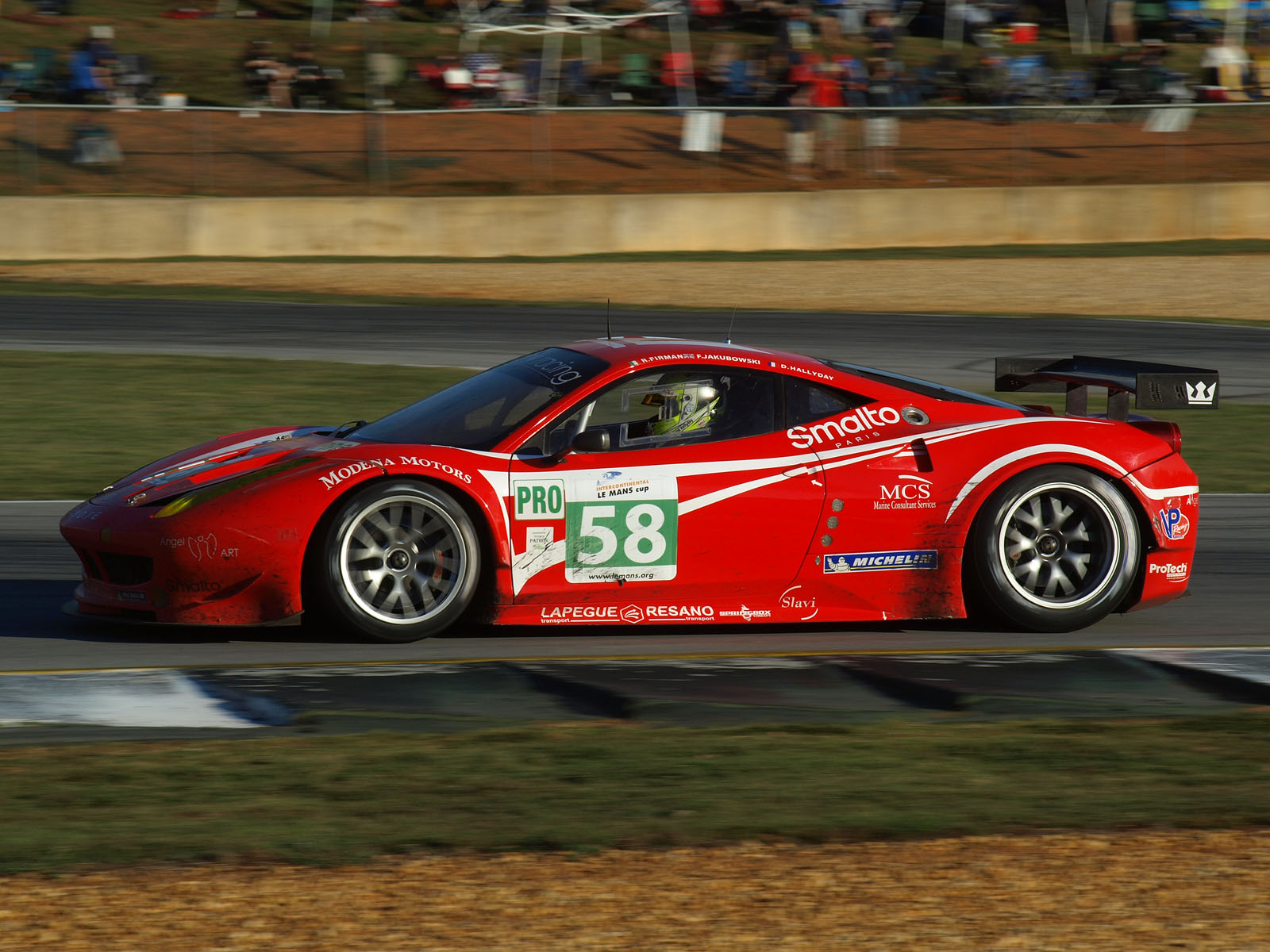
#58 Luxury Ferrari in 2011

The team had its first venture in the 24 Hours of Le Mans in 2011, where they raced two cars in the LMGTE Pro class. They qualified 36th and 41st, which is 8th and 13th in their class with the #59 and #58 cars respectively.

Unfortunately, both cars didn't finish the race, with the #58 car managing only 136 laps, and the #59 car lasting a further 47 with 183 laps.

=== 2012 ===
For the 2012 24 Hours of Le Mans, the team qualified first in the LMGTE Pro class with the #59 car, which was 34th overall and just under five tenths of a second faster than the nearest competitor while the #58 car in the LMGTE Am class qualified in 44th, one place ahead of one of the LMP2 cars.

During the race, the #58 car retired after 146 laps, while the #59 car went on to complete 333 laps and finish the race in 18th, which was 2nd in their class after losing out to the winner by 3 laps. This also marked the team's first finish in the event since its debut in 2011.

== Race Summary ==
Season	Series	Class	Races	Wins	Poles	Podiums	Points	Position
2010	Porsche Carrera Cup France	–	?	?	?	?	202	1st
2010	International GT Open	GTS	16	4	0	9	87	2nd
2011	Intercontinental Le Mans Cup	LMGTE Pro	7	0	0	2	38	3rd
2011	American Le Mans Series	GT	2	0	0	0	NC	NC
2012	FIA World Endurance Championship	LMGTE Pro	3	0	2	2	54	4th*
2012	FIA World Endurance Championship	LMGTE Am	3	0	3	1	18	6th*

* Season still in progress.

=== Complete 24 Hours of Le Mans results ===
Year	Entrant	No.	Car	Drivers	Class	Laps	Pos.	Class Pos.
2011	(France) Luxury Racing	58	Ferrari 458 Italia GT2	(France) Anthony Beltoise (France) François Jakubowski (France) Pierre Thiriet	LMGTE Pro	136	DNF	DNF
2011	(France) Luxury Racing	59	Ferrari 458 Italia GT2	(France) Frédéric Makowiecki (Brazil) Jaime Melo (Monaco) Stéphane Ortelli	LMGTE Pro	183	DNF	DNF
2012	(France) Luxury Racing	59	Ferrari 458 Italia GT2	(Germany) Dominik Farnbacher (France) Frédéric Makowiecki (Brazil) Jaime Melo	LMGTE Pro	333	18th	2nd
2012	(France) Luxury Racing	58	Ferrari 458 Italia GT2	(Germany) Pierre Ehret (United States) Gunnar Jeannette (United States) Frankie Montecalvo	LMGTE Am	146	DNF	DNF
