= Takeshi Uchiyamada =

Japanese businessman (born 1946)

Takeshi Uchiyamada 内山田 竹志
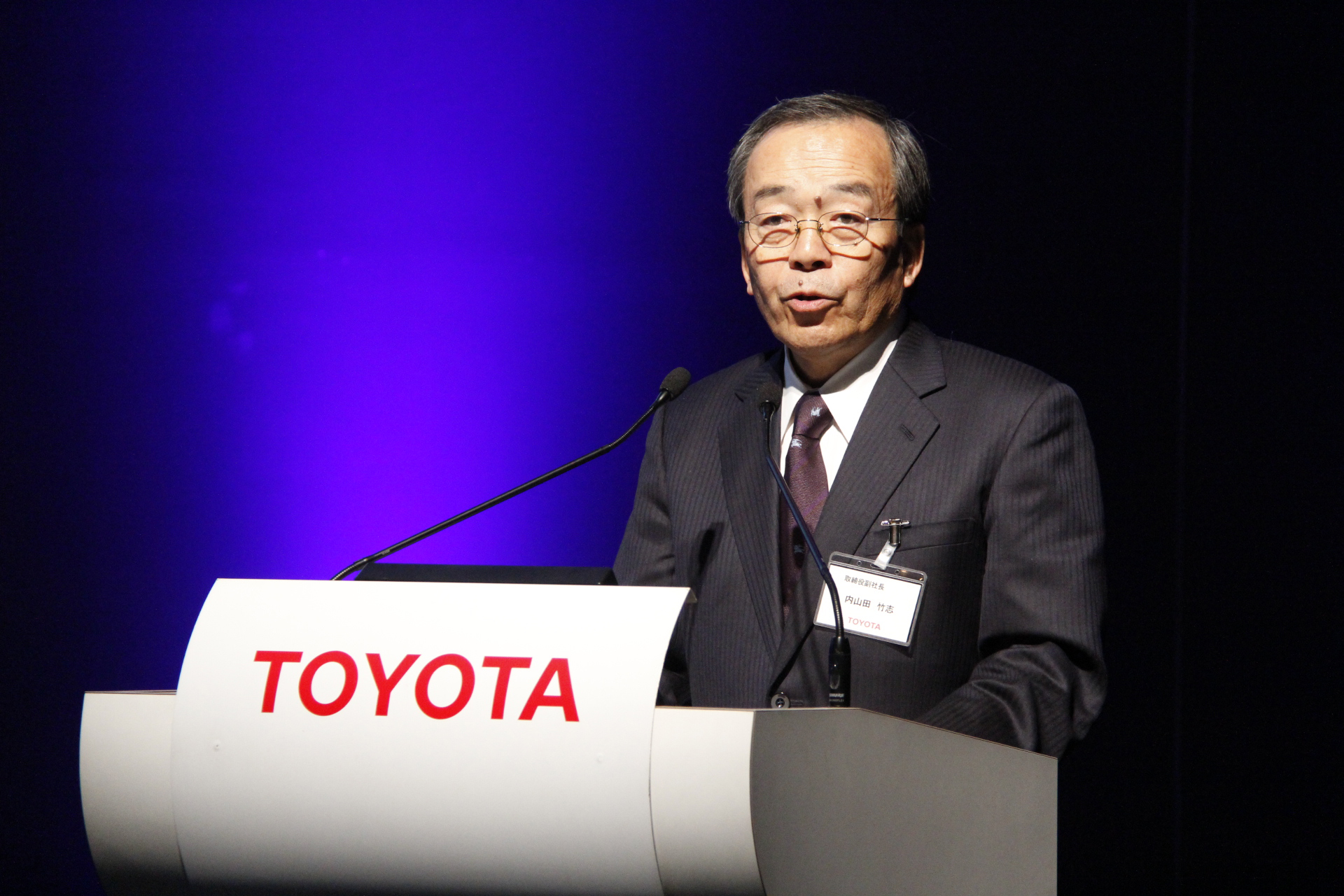
- Born: August 17, 1946 (age 80); Okazaki, Japan
- Education: University of Nagoya
- Occupations: Chairman, Toyota Motor Corporation

Takeshi Uchiyamada (内山田 竹志, Uchiyamada Takeshi; born August 17, 1946) is a Japanese businessman who was chairman of Toyota from 2013 to 2023. He graduated from Nagoya University. He is known as the "father of the Prius" for his role in leading the development of the Toyota Prius, the world's best-selling hybrid electric vehicle in history.
