= Nissan GT-R =

Sports car manufactured by Japanese automobile manufacturer Nissan

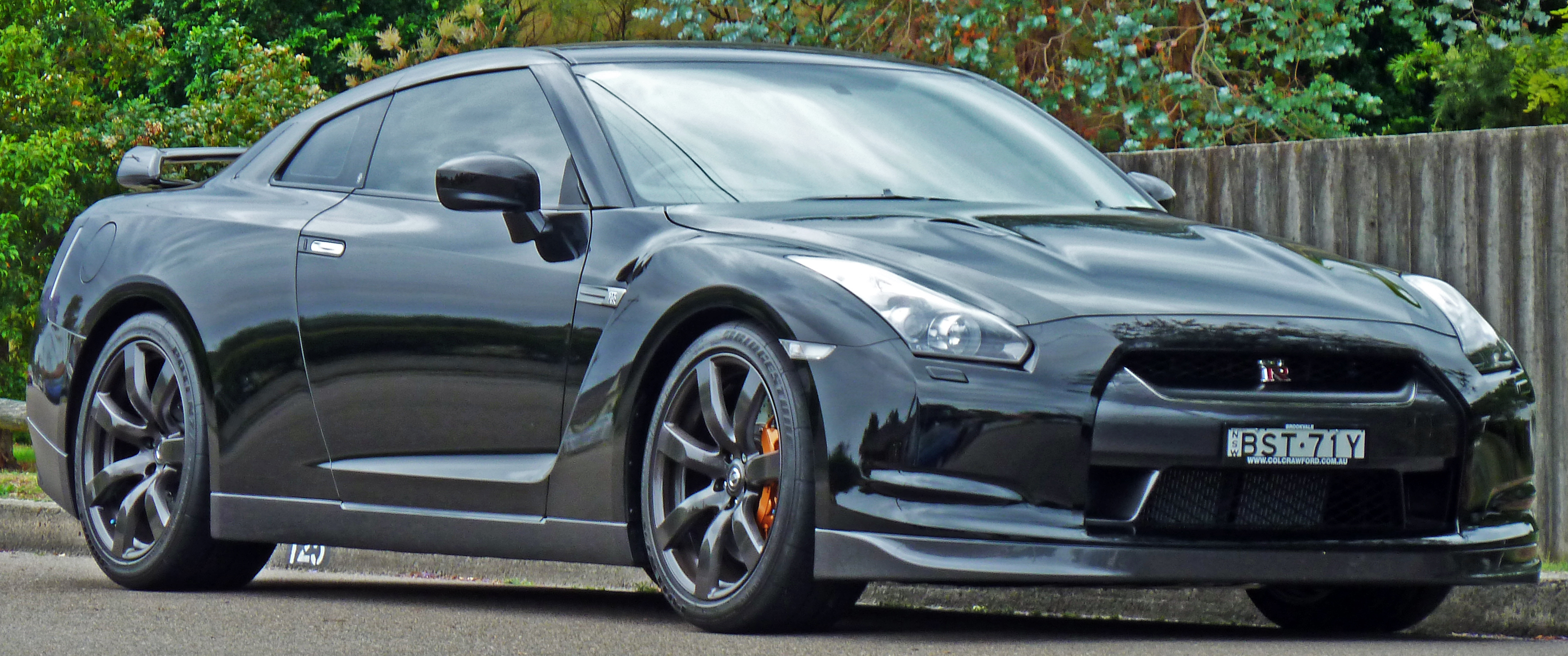
- Nissan GT-R (pre-facelift)

Overview
- Manufacturer: Nissan
- Model code: R35
- Production: December 2007 – August 2025
- Model years: 2009 – 2024 (North America)
- Assembly: Japan: Kaminokawa, Tochigi (Nissan Motor Tochigi Plant)
- Designer: Engine: Naoki Nakada; Exterior: Hirohisa Ono; Interior: Akira Nishimura; Chief Designer: Hiroshi Hasegawa; Design Director: Shiro Nakamura; Chief Engineer: Kazutoshi Mizuno

Body and chassis
- Class: Sports car/Grand tourer (S)
- Body style: 2-door 2+2 seater coupé
- Layout: Front mid-engine, all-wheel drive
- Platform: Nissan Premium Midship

Powertrain
- Engine: 3.8 L VR38DETT twin-turbocharged V6
- Power output: 2007–2008: 353 kW (473 hp; 480 PS); 2009: 357 kW (478 hp; 485 PS); 2010–2011: 390 kW (523 hp; 530 PS); 2012–2015: 405 kW (542 hp; 550 PS); 2016–2025: 419 kW (562 hp; 570 PS); Nismo, Track Edition: 441 kW (592 hp; 600 PS); GT-R50: 530 kW (710 hp; 720 PS)
- Transmission: 6-speed BorgWarner co-designed GR6Z30A dual-clutch transmission

Dimensions
- Wheelbase: 2,780 mm (109.4 in)
- Length: 2007–2009: 4,656 mm (183.3 in); 2010–2015: 4,671 mm (183.9 in); 2016–2022: 4,690 mm (184.65 in); 2023–2025: 4,709 mm (185.4 in)
- Width: 2007–2009, 2012–2025: 1,895 mm (74.6 in); 2010–2011: 1,902 mm (74.9 in)
- Height: 2007–2009, 2012–2015, 2023–2025: 1,369 mm (53.9 in); 2010–2011, 2016–2022: 1,372 mm (54.0 in)
- Kerb weight: 2007–2009: 1,740 kg (3,836 lb); SpecV: 1,680 kg (3,704 lb); 2010–2013: 1,735 kg (3,825 lb); Black Edition: 1,730 kg (3,814 lb); 2014–2015: 1,745 kg (3,847 lb); Black Edition: 1,740 kg (3,836 lb); Track Edition: 1,720 kg (3,792 lb); Nismo: 1,730 kg (3,814 lb); 2016–2018: 1,785 kg (3,935 lb); Track Edition: 1,775 kg (3,913 lb); Nismo: 1,775 kg (3,913 lb); 2019–2025: 1,785 kg (3,935 lb); Track Edition: 1,760 kg (3,880 lb); Nismo: 1,750 kg (3,858 lb); T-spec: 1,760 kg (3,880 lb)

Chronology
- Predecessor: Nissan Skyline GT-R

The Nissan GT-R (Gran Turismo–Racing; model code: R35; Japanese: 日産・GT-R; Nissan GT-R) is a sports car, built by Japanese marque Nissan from 2007 to 2025. It has a 2+2 seating layout and is also considered a grand tourer. The engine is front-mid mounted and drives all four wheels. It succeeded the Nissan Skyline GT-R, a high-performance variant of the Nissan Skyline. Although this model was the sixth-generation to bear the GT-R name, it was no longer part of the Skyline line-up. The car was built on the PM platform, derived from the FM platform used in the Skyline and Nissan Z models. Production was conducted in a shared production line at Nissan's Tochigi plant in Japan.

As per Nissan's intention of creating a world beating sports car, the GT-R brand was revived as part of the Nissan Revival Plan. Overall development began in 2000, following seven years of development and testing, including the introduction of two concept models in 2001 and 2005. The production version of the GT-R was unveiled at the 2007 Tokyo Motor Show. The GT-R was a brand-new car built on the PM platform, and featured innovative concepts and technologies, such as advanced aerodynamics, the VR38DETT engine, an active suspension system and the ATTESA E-TS Pro all-wheel-drive system; it is the first ever rear mounted independent transaxle all-wheel-drive vehicle. It was one of the first production cars to feature launch control and a dual-clutch transmission. The overall body was made out of steel, aluminium and carbon-fibre.

Unlike its predecessors, the GT-R was offered worldwide. It received various facelifts and updates comparable with the competition, and several special editions were offered during its prolonged production span. The car is used in motorsports, notably winning championships in the FIA GT1 World Championship, Super GT and in various GT3 racing series, including the GT World Challenge. It is well received among enthusiasts and automotive publications, British motor magazine Top Gear claimed it as "one of the most incredible cars of any kind ever built", due to its exceptional performance and practicality given at an affordable price. Listed among the fastest production cars—as it set the record for the fastest accelerating four-seater production car—it has won numerous notable accolades such as the World Performance Car of The Year among many others.

In 2021, sales in the Australian market were discontinued due to new side impact regulations. The European market, including the United Kingdom, were also suspended, with new noise regulations. Followed by the suspension of sales in North America in 2024, sales in Japan and other markets remained until late-August 2025, ending production of the GT-R after 18 years and around 48,000 units were produced.

== History and development ==
=== History ===
Between 1969 and 1973, and again between 1989 and 2002, Nissan produced a high performance version of its Nissan Skyline coupe, the Skyline GT-R. This car proved to be iconic for Nissan, achieving much fame and success on the road and in motorsports.

The GT-R was an entirely new model, departing from its predecessor. Though they shared a little with each other, such as the signature four round tail lights, the ATTESA E-TS Pro all-wheel-drive system, and a twin-turbocharged 6-cylinder engine, the GT-R diverged significantly. Notably, it omitted the HICAS four-wheel-steering system, with engineers recognizing its incompatibility with the advanced all-wheel-drive setup, which would compromise the car's performance. The previous RB26DETT engine was succeeded by the VR38DETT engine. Another continuity from its predecessor was the chassis code; the all-new version was identified as CBA-R35 initially and later as DBA-R35 and 4BA-R35 for subsequent model years, or simply R35 for short (where CBA, DBA, and 4BA denote the emissions standard prefix). The car also preserved the nickname of its predecessor, Godzilla, a moniker originally given by the Australian motoring publication Wheels in 1989 for its R32 generation model.

=== Development ===
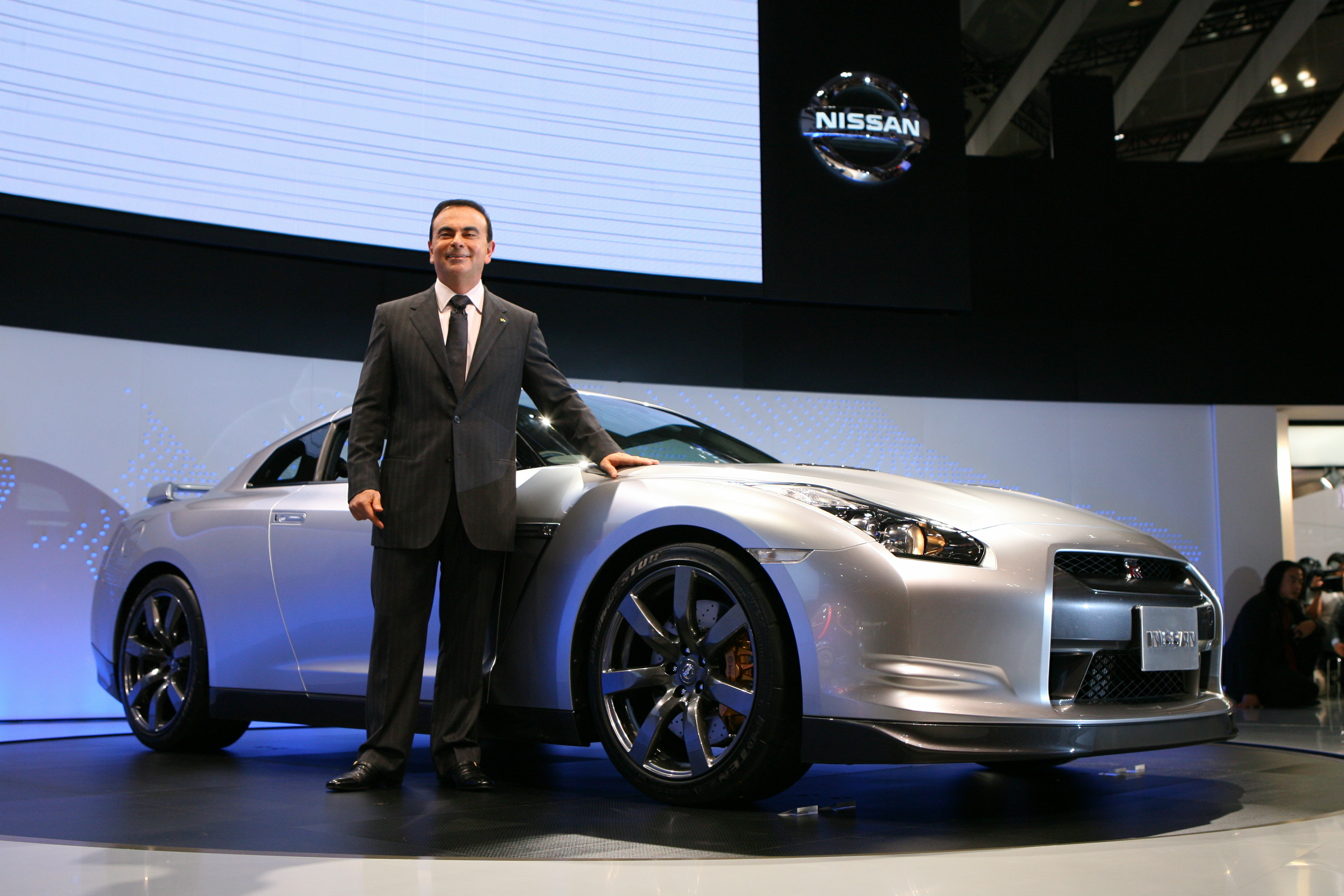
Nissan's then CEO, Carlos Ghosn spearheaded the revival of the GT-R

In 2000, as per the request of CEO Carlos Ghosn, Nissan commenced the revival of their iconic sports car model, as part of the Nissan Revival Plan. Ghosn believed that introducing a halo car would increase public interest and enthusiasm towards the then-struggling Nissan brand, ultimately bolstering sales. Therefore, he insisted the GT-R should be made as a high-performance car, capable of rivaling esteemed sports cars from manufacturers in the likes of Porsche, Lamborghini, and Ferrari, all while maintaining a comparatively affordable price point. He also sought to preserve a distinctive feature from its predecessors; four round taillights, which he considered the signature design element of all GT-R models.

Development began in 2000, with Nissan designers from Japan, US and Europe generating a multitude of sketches. Out of these, 50 designs reached Nissan's design director at the time, Shiro Nakamura. Nakamura emphasized that the design must not only embody a modern sports car aesthetic but also encapsulate Japanese cultural elements and pay homage to its predecessor's heritage. In 2001, Ghosn officially announced ongoing development of the GT-R, with a concept reveal at the 2001 Tokyo Motor Show. The chief designer, Hiroshi Hasegawa, dedicated over four years to complete interior and exterior designs, as designs should exude sportiness, modernity, and aerodynamic efficiency to meet the ambitious performance targets set for the car.

Chief engineer of the Skyline GT-R R34, Kazutoshi Mizuno (also known as Mr. GT-R), spearheaded the mechanical aspects of development. Mizuno initially rejected the project, due to the directive to build the car on the outdated FM platform. Mizuno expressed his reservations, stating, "I could not make a world-class performance car from this platform as Ghosn requested." In April 2003, he constructed a Infiniti G35 based GT-R prototype on an advanced iteration of the FM platform known as the Premium Midship (PM) platform. Mizuno was then granted the full development authority and was designated as the chief engineer of the GT-R. At the 2003 Tokyo Motor Show, Ghosn confirmed that the production version would debut in the fall of 2007. Subsequently, the prototype underwent refinement at Lotus Engineering, focusing on enhancing chassis rigidity and revising suspension geometry to align with the car's performance goals.

In January 2004, Mizuno officially commenced development with a specialized team and a full-scale GT-R model. Differing from the typical development team, this specialized group was made by recruiting the best engineers and technicians from each department. The Mizuno-led team developed and tested the drivetrain and chassis, including the suspension setup and brakes, using the Infiniti G35 test mule at the Nürburgring and Sendai Hi-Land Raceway. Mizuno claimed his ambitious goals were to build the GT-R so as to be able to have comfortable conversations with a passenger at speeds of 300 km/h (186.5 mph). Furthermore, he aimed for a power-to-weight ratio of under 4 kg (9 lb) per horsepower and a lap time at the Nürburgring in under 8 minutes. Notable mechanical designs and concepts, including the Brembo brakes system and the Bilstein suspension setup, were conceived and developed by Mizuno himself. Initial plans for the GT-R involved a straight-6 engine, consistent with its predecessors. However, the decision was made to opt for a shorter V6 engine for ideal weight distribution. Nissan's chief powertrain engineer, Naoki Nakada, spearheaded the development of the brand-new VR38DETT 3.8L twin-turbocharged V6 engine, which was an evolution of the VQ engine.

To achieve the initial goal of creating a high-performance user-friendly car, a unique combination of production car and race car-like aerodynamics had to be developed. This challenge arose from the dual requirements of generating a respectable amount of downforce for enhanced high-speed stability while maintaining minimal drag for improved fuel efficiency. Initially, engineers expressed the complexity of achieving such an aerodynamic level, given a road car's high ground clearance, safety regulations, visibility standards, material costs and various other factors. Aerodynamics development began in early 2004, spearheaded by a team of the company's best engineers, including Yoshitaka Suzuka, the developer of Nissan's successful Le Mans prototypes. The process began with an internal design competition among Nissan's design studios located in Atsugi, Tokyo, London, and La Jolla. Over 80 sketches were submitted, aligning with the original styling concepts. Subsequently, 12 distinct sketches were created by design elements from the initial submissions. Further refinement whittled them down to 3 1/4 scale wind tunnel models created by the development team.

The team set a numerical target for the car to achieve a drag coefficient of Cd=0.28 or lower, combined with front and rear downforce, which was not done by any other manufacturer. Suzuka initially proposed utilizing active aerodynamics, but the idea faced rejection due to the concerns of inflating the car's price beyond Nissan's planned offering. In August, Suzuka initiated wind tunnel testing at the Nissan Technical Center in Atsugi, spanning three months and involving over 300 test runs using the scale models. The program then transitioned to two 40 percent scale models—one representing the GT-R and the other replicating the Infiniti G35 test mule. Drawing data from its full sized version's testing at the Nürburgring, this scale model served as a comparable datum against the GT-R model. Initial wind tunnel tests with the GT-R model yielded a drag coefficient of Cd=0.32. As the project progressed, exterior designers Hirohisa Ono and Masato Taguchi joined to refine certain aspects of the car, such as adjusting the front nose height. However, the efforts fell short of achieving the anticipated overall improvement in aerodynamics. Subsequently, Suzuka shifted the focus towards enhancing the car's internal airflow, which required significant changes to the chassis frame design. He insisted the chassis department to lower the frame rails to align with the passenger compartment, aiming to eliminate transitions and streamline airflow beneath the car. The team later employed a CFD program for wind tunnel testing, swiftly upgrading hundreds of components in a short period of time to optimize airflow and minimize drag. Lotus Engineering's road-rolling wind tunnel in the United Kingdom, was also used during the process. Over one and a half years of development, involving more than 2000 wind tunnel test runs, the engineers ultimately achieved a visually appealing exterior design with a drag coefficient of Cd=0.27 combined with front and rear downforce.

Engineers and designers dedicated more than six years to complete overall development of the car. After finalizing development in 2006, an additional year was dedicated for testing before reaching the conclusive stage. Nissan officially announced that the production version would make its debut at the 2007 Tokyo Motor Show. Ghosn was confident in the GT-R's potential profitability for Nissan, and dispelled the rumours of it being sold as an Infiniti model in North America, confirming its global release as a Nissan model.

=== Concepts ===
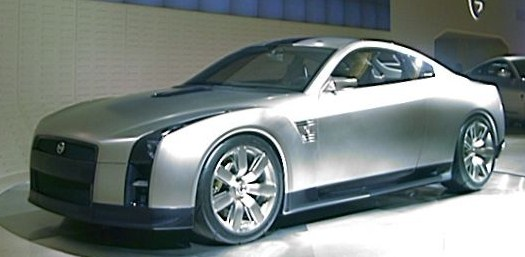
GT-R Concept at the 2001 Tokyo Motor Show

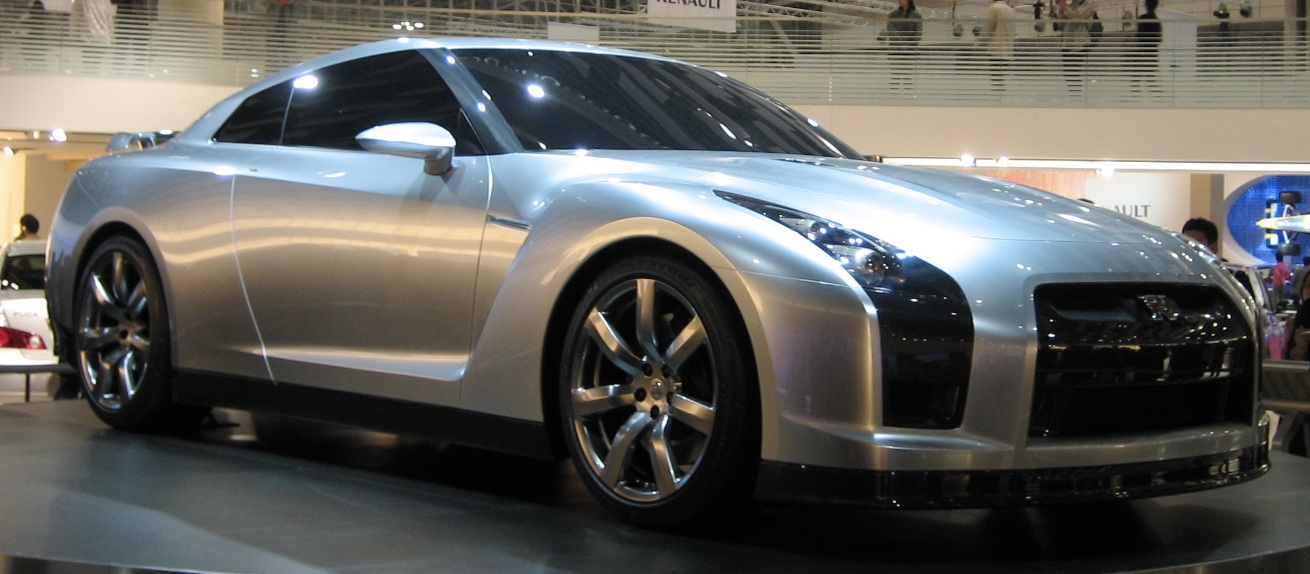
GT-R Proto at the 2005 Tokyo Motor Show

Nissan unveiled the GT-R concept without prior notice at the 35th Tokyo Motor Show in 2001. Previewed as the 21st-century GT-R, Nissan confirmed the production version will be sold worldwide unlike its predecessors, which were sold only in a limited number of markets. The concept car featured an aggressive, muscular, wide and low exterior look. The interior featured a deep seating position, full-length centre console, integrated structural cage and a driver's command centre.

Nissan unveiled a redesigned version of the concept car, the GT-R Proto, at the 2005 Tokyo Motor Show. It featured redesigned exterior elements over the concept car to improve overall airflow and reveal the identity of the car. These elements included a redesigned front air intake, front fenders with air vents behind them and the sides of the body were sculptured towards the rear fenders, no technical information were given for both concept and prototype cars. Officials claimed the production version would be 80 to 90 percent based on this prototype.

=== Testing ===
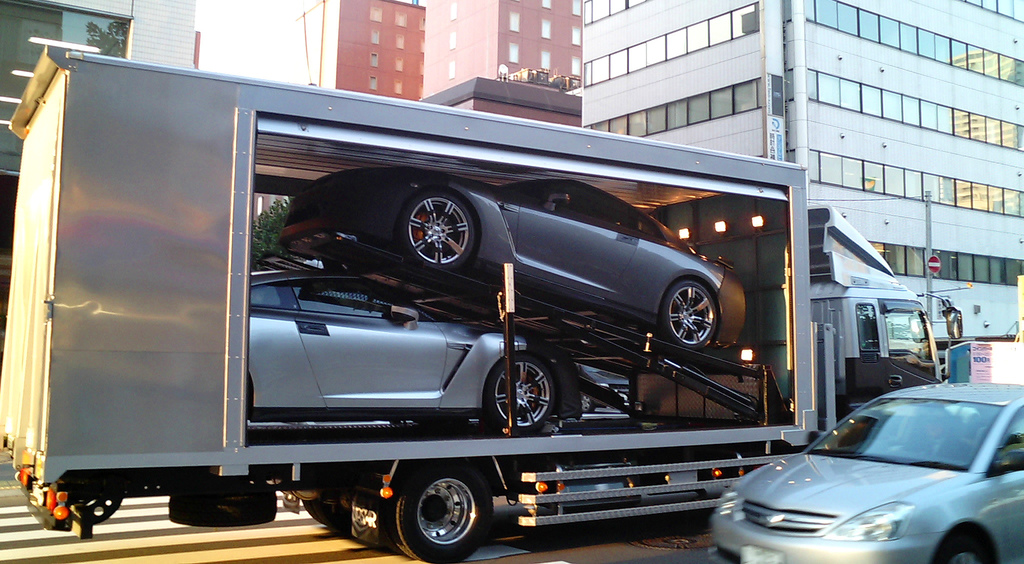
GT-R test mules being transported by a truck in Japan

As overall development of the car was finalized around 2006, Nissan began testing in several countries on different road and weather conditions to fine tune the all-new performance car. In late 2004, the Infiniti G35 test mule was spied at the Nürburgring, it featured highly modified body panels, drivetrain, suspension and braking setups. In late 2006 and early 2007, GT-R test mules were spied for the first time, alongside a Porsche 911 Turbo on public roads in New Mexico and California, at race circuits such as in the Nürburgring and Laguna Seca. During a test session at the Sendai Hi-Land Raceway, Ghosn joined the test team to directly test drive the car against a Porsche 911 Turbo, which served as the benchmark during the development of the GT-R. At the end of the session, he complimented the team for their effort to build the car in the way he imagined. During a test session at the Nürburgring, Nissan invited automotive journalists of magazines in the likes of Car and Driver and Evo to test drive both the GT-R and 911 Turbo around the track, Autobahn and on country roads. Journalists praised the GT-R for its exceptional grip, handling and acceleration. End of overall testing in September 2007, Mizuno and team recorded a lap time of 7:38.54 minutes around the Nürburgring Nordschleife in damp conditions, claimed the car would have set a much quicker lap time on ideal track conditions. Following the introduction of the production version, the team continued development and testing to provide upgrades for later model years.

== Production ==
=== Production model ===
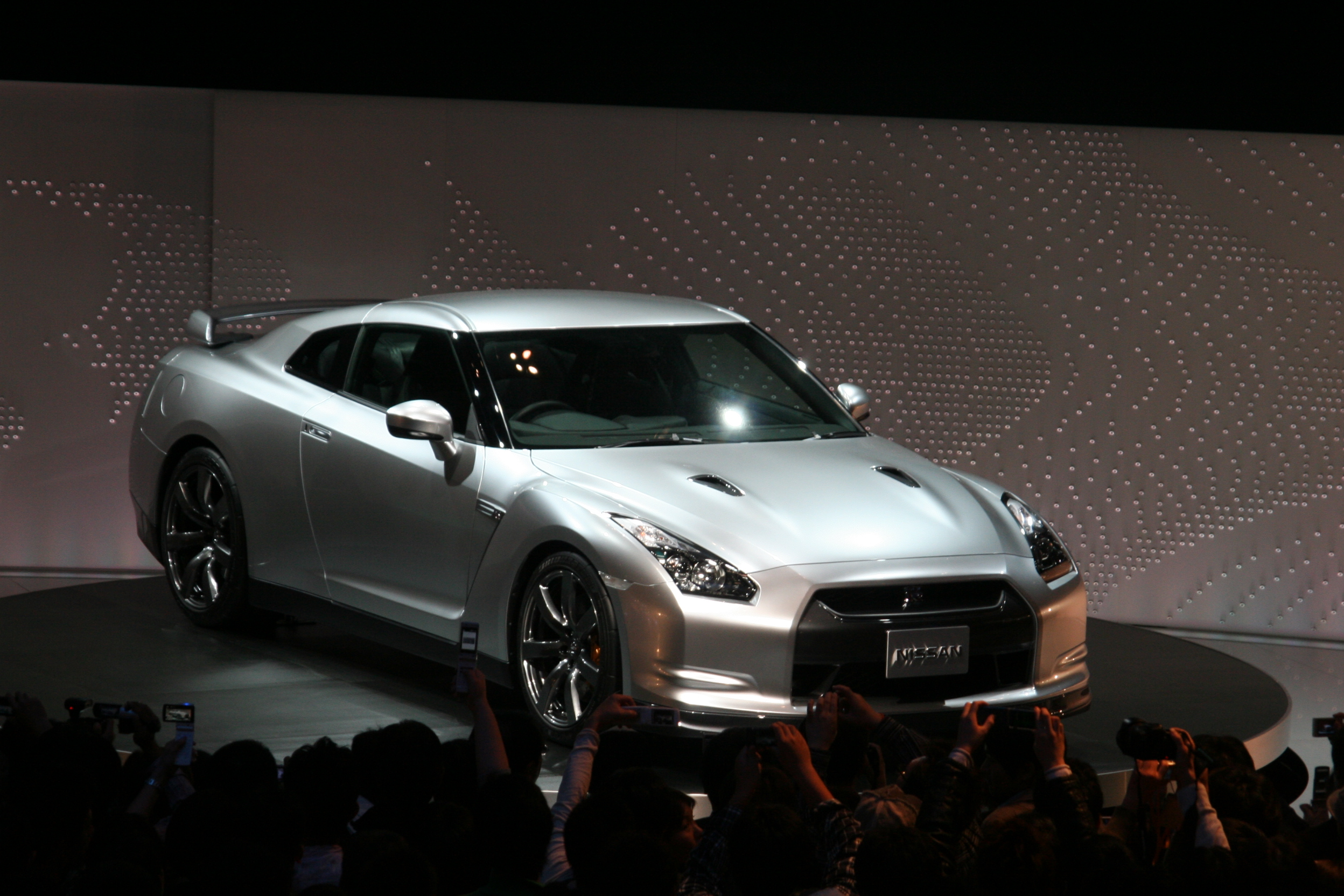

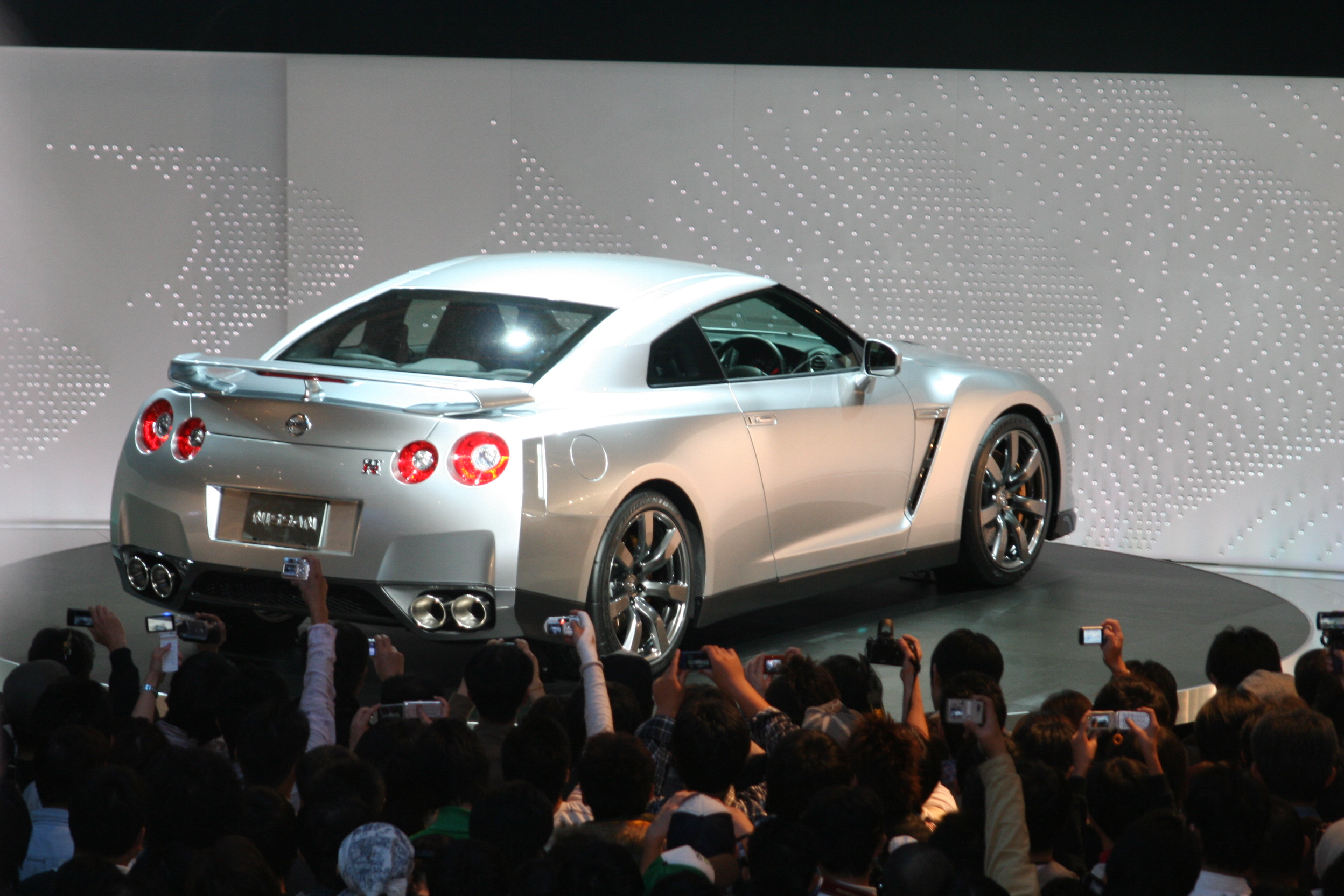
GT-R debut at the 2007 Tokyo Motor Show

The production version of the GT-R was unveiled at the 2007 Tokyo Motor Show, following an on-screen 7:38.54 minute lap time in the partially wet Nürburgring Nordschleife was broadcast, Nissan claimed it was the fastest lap time for a mass-produced car, beating the benchmark Porsche 911 Turbo's time of 7:40 minutes. The GT-R was previewed as "A supercar, for Anyone, Anywhere, Anytime". In November, 2007, Nissan revealed that the car already had a considerable demand, as more than 3,000 buyers pre-ordered the car in Japan before its official launch. The car was expected to sell around 200 units per month, to maintain exclusivity. The first production GT-R was purchased by Nissan's CEO at the time, Carlos Ghosn. Deliveries began on December 6, 2007, in Japan, on July 7, 2008, in North America and in March 2009 in Europe. The large disparity in initial marketing between these regional releases was due to Nissan having to build GT-R performance centres where the car was serviced.

==== 2009 update ====
In 2009, the GT-R received its first—of many—updates for the 2010 model year. It featured increased engine power output of 485 PS (357 kW; 478 hp) at 6,400 rpm, with no improvement in engine torque. The launch control system was reprogrammed to reduce stress in the transaxle and improve acceleration. It was also offered for sold 2009 models. Other upgrades include re-tuned suspension, updated wheel finish, standard front seat and side curtain airbags.

=== 2010 facelift ===
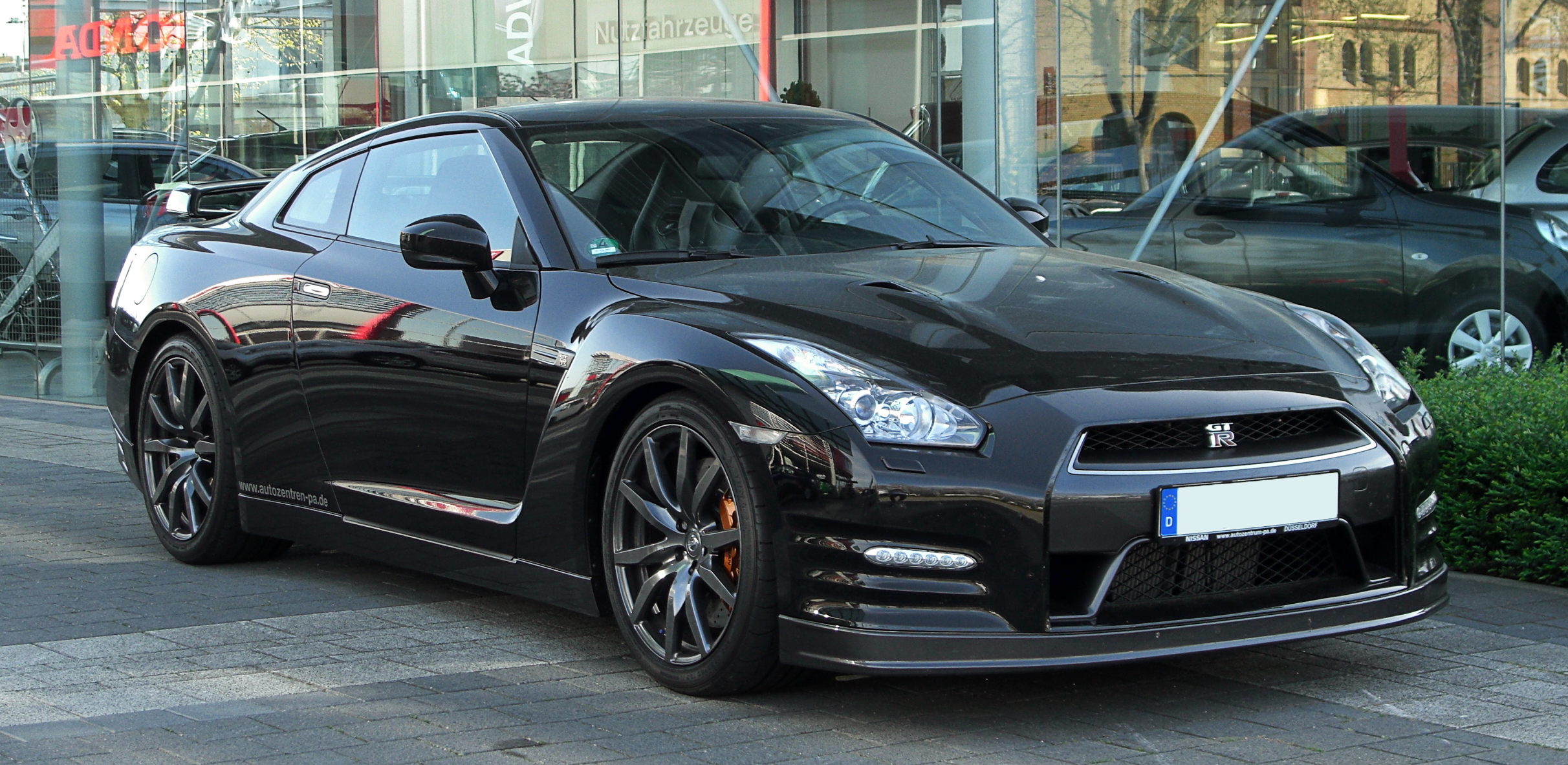

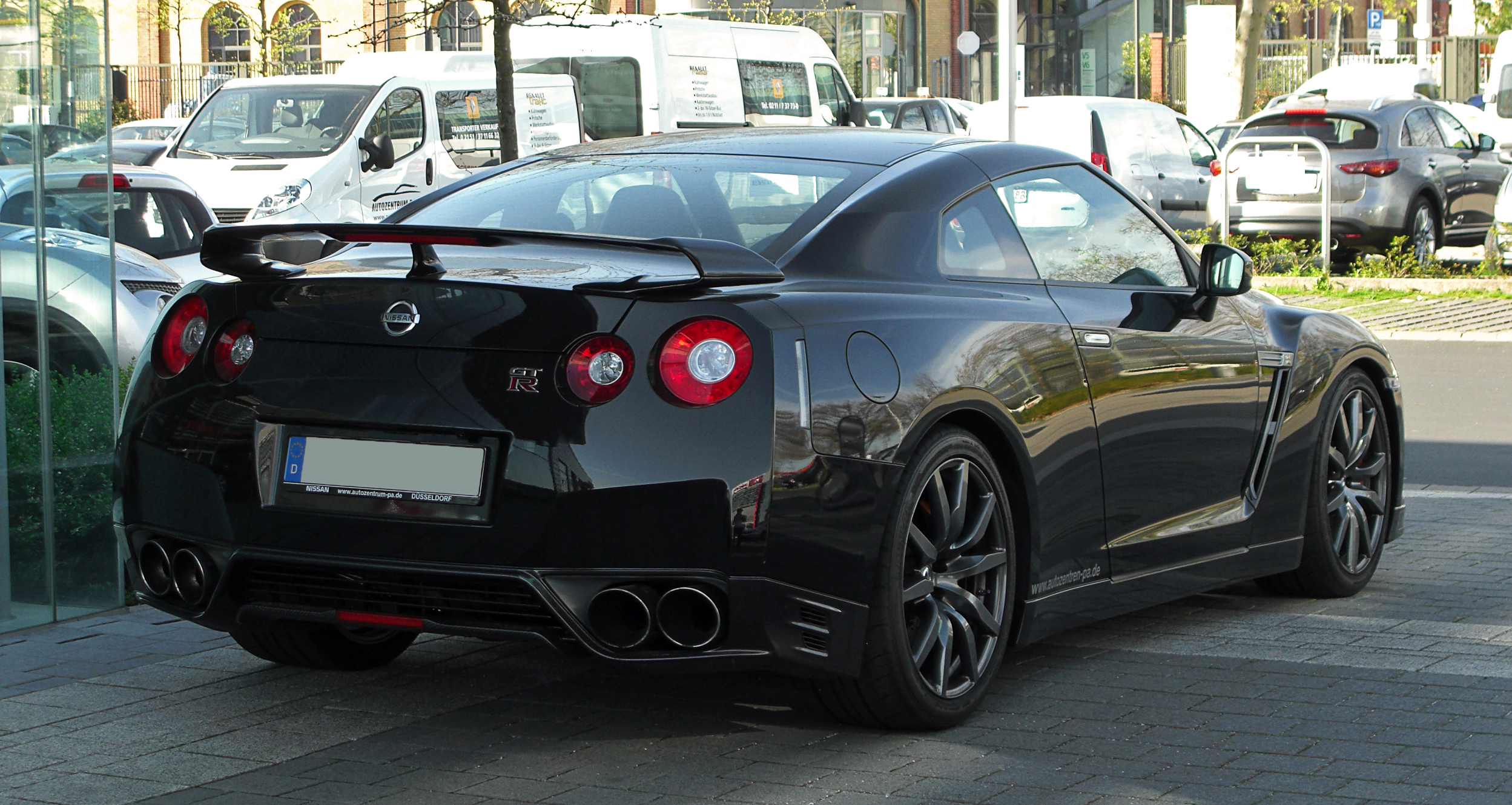
Facelifted 2010 (2011 model year) GT-R

In 2010, for the 2011 model year, the GT-R received its first facelift. The car was revised and re-codenamed as "DBA–R35", replacing the original "CBA–R35". The revised version featured the same engine with altered mapping, changed valve timing, larger inlets and a modified exhaust system which boosts rated power to 390 kW (530 PS; 523 hp) at 6,400 rpm and 607 N⋅m (448 lb⋅ft) of torque from 3,200 to 6,000 rpm. The chassis was stiffened by a more rigid front strut bar made out of carbon composite. Larger front brake rotors, lighter and stiffer wheels, and revised Dunlop tyres reduced unsprung weight by 12 kg (26.5 lb). The suspensions contained stiffer springs, dampers and anti-roll bars and revised geometry to improve grip, new dampers provided more constant damping force. Cosmetic changes reduced its drag coefficient to Cd=0.26 and increased overall downforce by 10 percent. Achieved by a revised front bumper with integrated LEDs, improving radiator cooling and front brakes cooling while reducing drag. The revised rear diffuser improved downforce and additional rear cooling ducts were placed for further brake cooling. The interior improved quality and comfort. Offered with a new HDD CarWings navigation system, with enhanced entertainment features and a USB port with iPod connectivity. Engine noise and road noise were reduced, and the overall performance of the car was improved. Overall weight of the car was decreased by 5 kg (11 lb). The car went on sale in mid-November 2010 in Japan and February 2011 in Europe, North America, and in other regions.

==== 2012 update ====
Similar to the update in 2009, the car was offered a revision in 2012, for the 2013 model year. It featured increased power output of 550 PS (405 kW; 542 hp) at 6,400 rpm and 628 N⋅m (463 lb⋅ft) of torque from 3,200 to 5,200 rpm. This was achieved by revised intake manifolds reducing air resistance, enlarged duct for the intercooler, new exhaust lowering back-pressure, and sodium-filled exhaust valves reducing the temperature of the combustion chambers. The ECU was remapped to alter valve timing, and improved air-fuel mixture ratio and ignition. A new flywheel housing, retuned suspension setup and revised weight distribution further increased performance and handling.

==== 2014 update ====
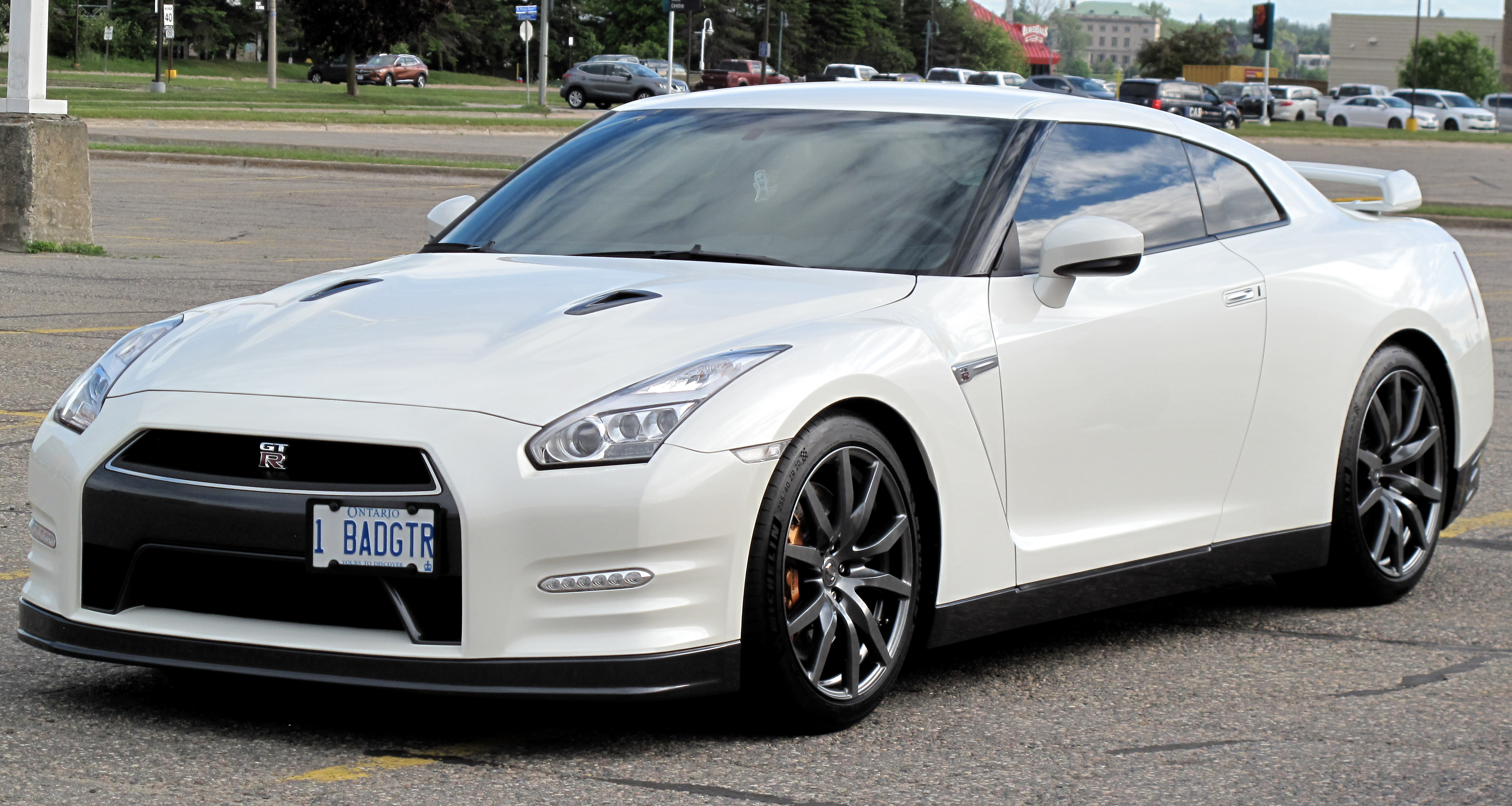

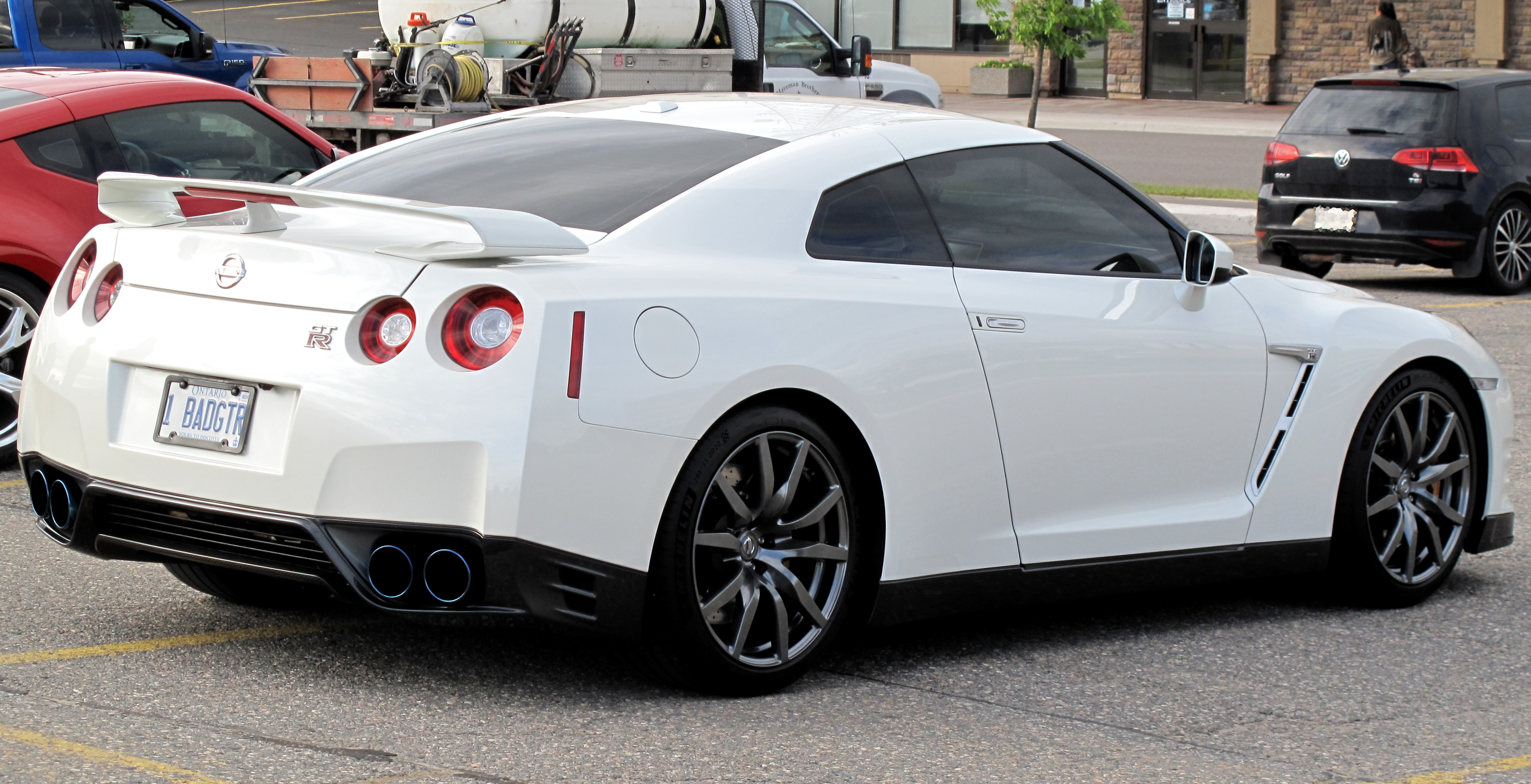
Updated 2014 (2015 model year) GT-R with revised headlights and taillights

The car was given significant improvements over the previous model year in 2014, for the 2015 model year. Along with the GT-R Nismo, it was previewed at the 2013 Tokyo Motor Show. Engine power remained same as the previous version, but an upgraded suspension setup with revised settings led to reduce load fluctuation between the four wheels, increased stability and provided more consistent grip. Tyre contact was improved with optimized electronic controls of the shock-absorber valves. Re-tuned front stabilizer spring rates and bush links, re-tuned brake system for more stopping power, and a fine-tuned steering improved handling. Cosmetic changes included new 20-inch alloy wheels, enhanced LED headlights and taillights with Adaptive Front-lighting System (AFS). These upgrades improved straight-line and cornering stability, better ride quality without sacrificing its acceleration and cornering performance. Overall weight of the car was increased by 10 kg (22 lb) across all models.

=== 2016 facelift ===
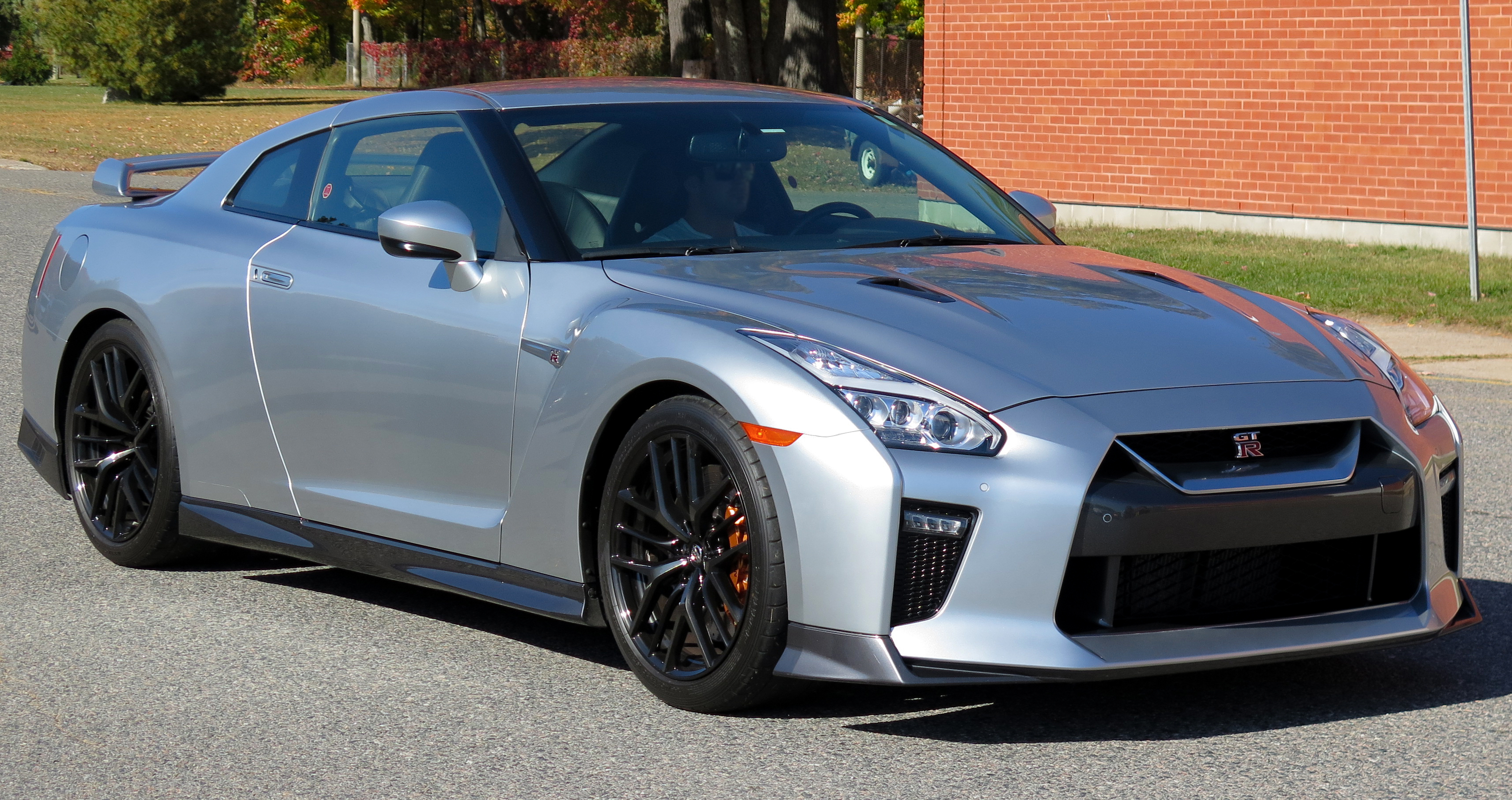

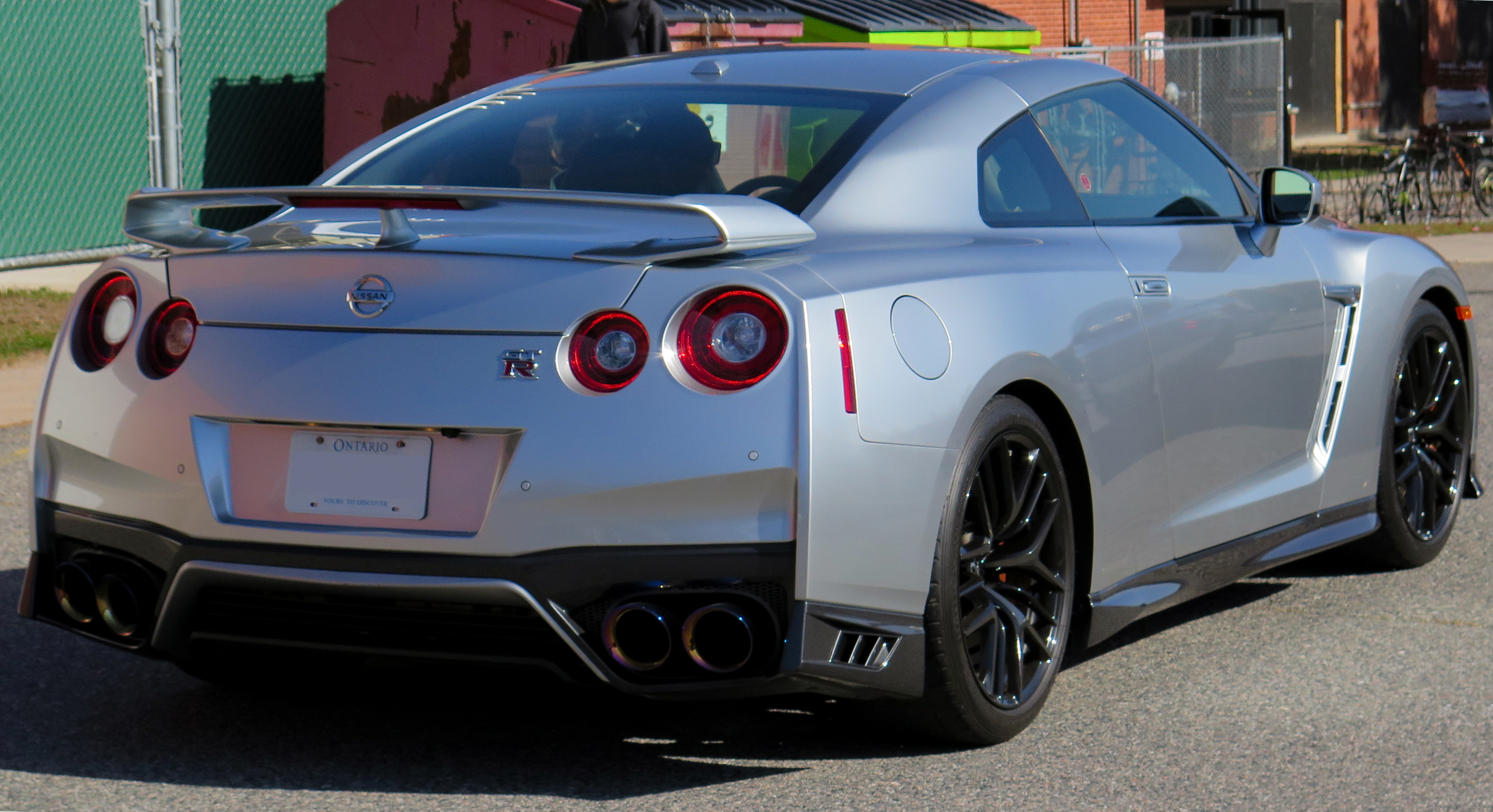
Facelifted 2016 (2017 model year) GT-R

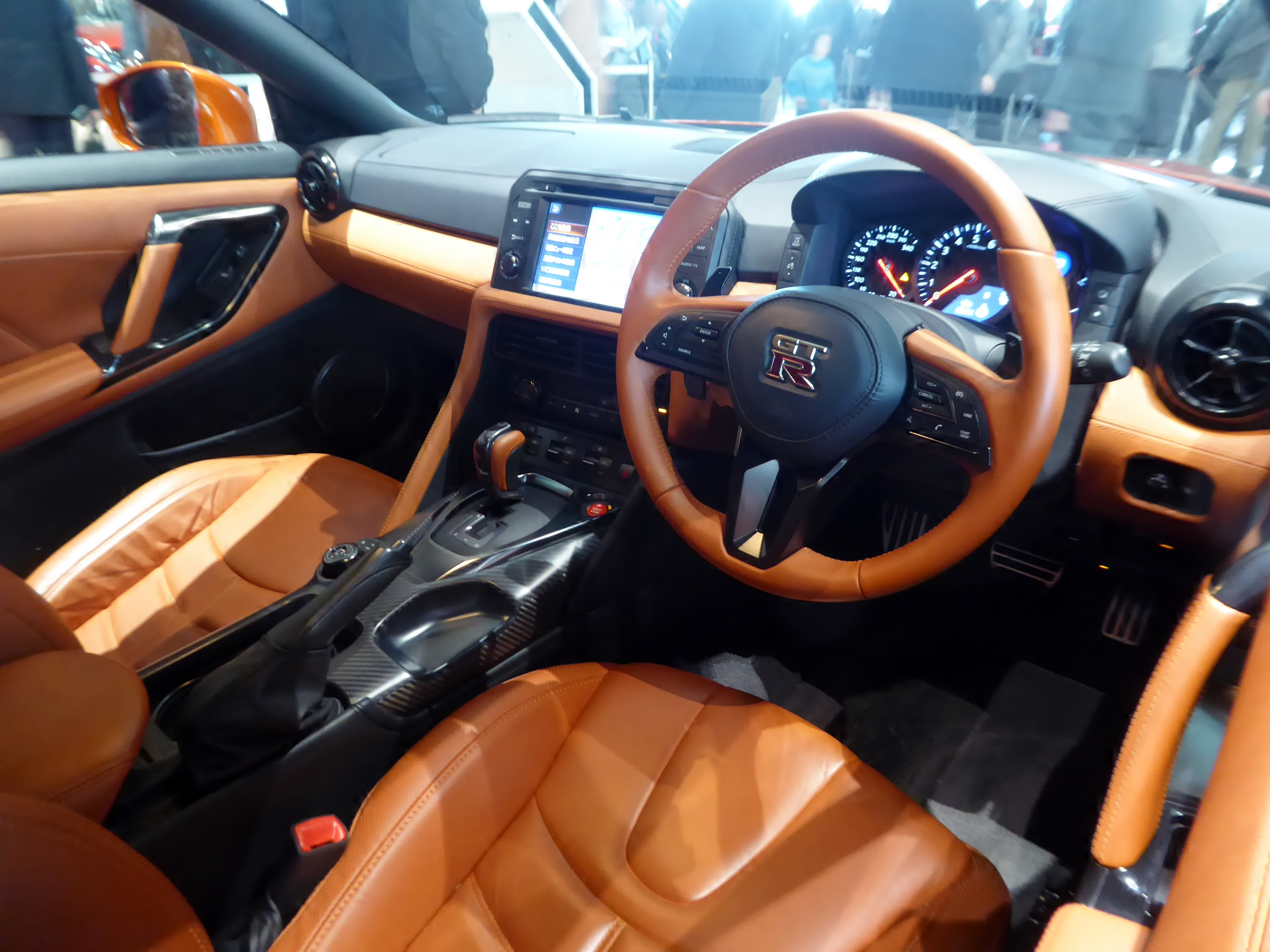
Interior

The GT-R received its second facelift in 2016, for the 2017 model year. The 2016 facelift GT-R was introduced at the 2016 New York International Auto Show. It was re-codenamed as "4BA–R35", featured the biggest changes in its 18-year production span. Redesigned front and rear facias improved engine and brake cooling, reshaped C-pillars reducing turbulence and strengthened hood reduced deformation at high speeds. Enhancements to engine cooling led to maintain turbo boost pressure dialed up, increasing engine power output to 570 PS (419 kW; 562 hp) at 6,800 rpm and 633 N⋅m (467 lbf⋅ft) of torque at 3,300–5,300 rpm, maximum speed of the engine (redline) was increased from 7,000 to 7,100 rpm. Transmission was remapped to shift gears smoothly and quieter than before, and new titanium exhaust reduced weight. Revised chassis structure improved torsional rigidity by 5 percent. Noise insulation was provided by acoustic windscreen, sound deadening materials and Bose noise cancellation system. Furthermore, upgraded brakes, re-tuned dampers, lighter forged alloy wheels and stiffer chassis improved ride quality and cornering by less aggressive turn in. The interior featured a new leather material, steering wheel, 8-inch display infotainment system and a redesigned carbon-fibre centre console. Nissan claimed the upgraded GT-R increased acceleration at mid to high rpm ranges (3,200 rpm and above) and featured optimal balance between handling and ride comfort. The upgrades were also applied to Track Edition and Nismo variants, overall weight of the car was increased by 40–55 kg (88–121 lb) across all models.

==== 2019 update ====
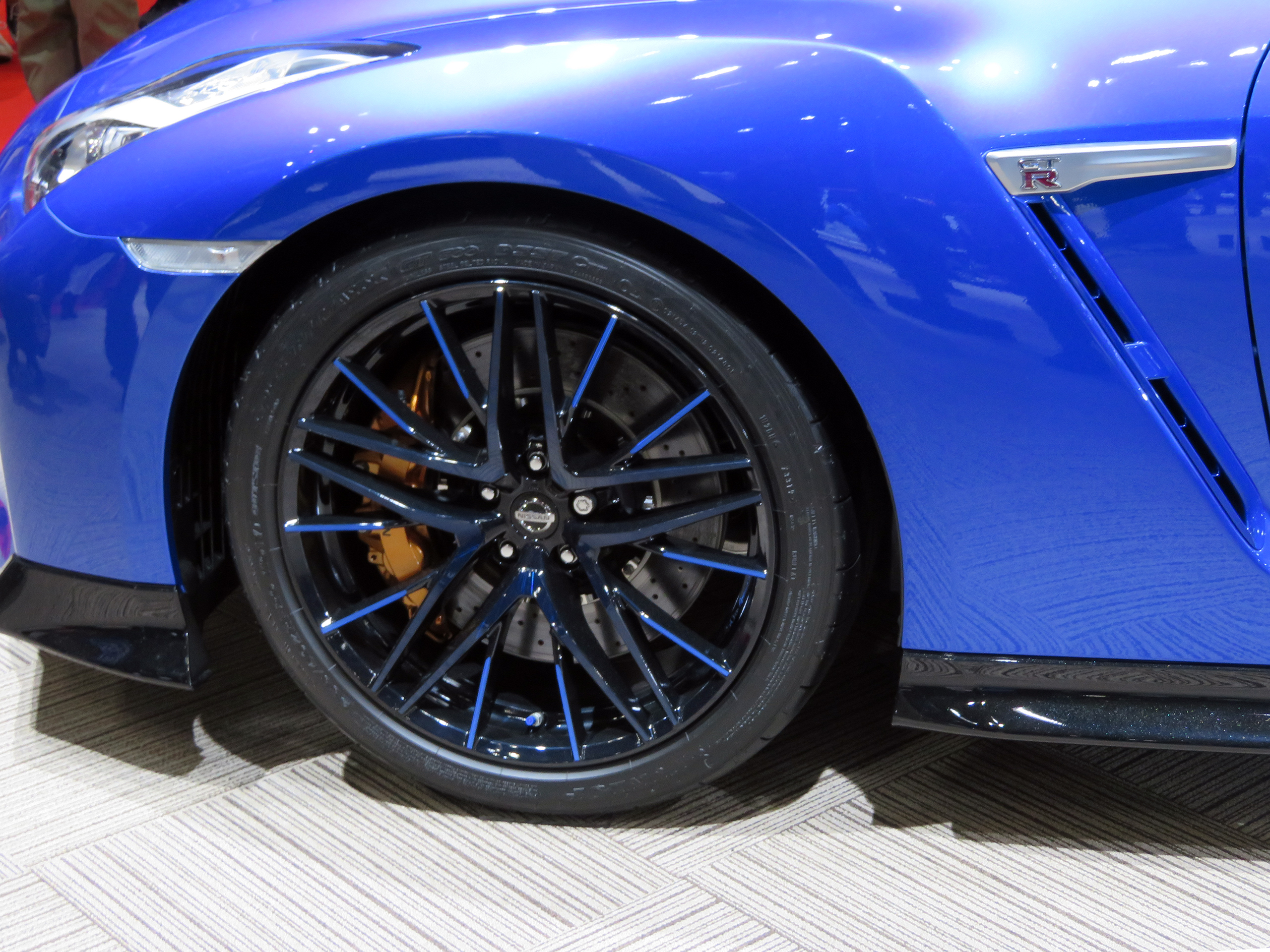
20-inch alloy wheels and the Bayside Blue body colour of the updated 2019 (2020 model year) GT-R

In 2019, for the 2020 model year, the car was offered with minor upgrades. Engine response and efficiency were improved by 5 percent due to the incorporation of revised turbocharges. The re-tuned transmission reduced its shifting time to 0.15 seconds, with gear selections happening during ABS engagement, it reduced understeer and improved cornering. Suspension and steering systems were also enhanced for improved handling. Cosmetic changes included new lightweight forged aluminium alloy wheels, interior and exterior colour options. Including the iconic Bayside Blue body colour, derived from the Skyline GT-R R34.

=== 2021–2022 hiatus ===
It was revealed the GT-R would not offer a 2022 model year in North America (mid-2021 to mid-2022 in calendar years), following the introduction of the T-spec variant. However, in Japan and other markets the car sold a 2022 model. Nissan Australia discontinued the GT-R in Australia and New Zealand from October 31, 2021, as it was no longer eligible for new side impact regulations. The car was sold 1,021 units in Australia and 89 units in New Zealand, a total of 1,110 units were sold in the Australian market during 12-years of sales since its debut in April 2009. Deliveries in Europe and United Kingdom were concluded in March 2022, for being unable to meet new noise regulations which took effect in June 2022. During its 13-years of sales since March 2009, Nissan sold more than 11,000 units in Europe.

In May 2022, Nissan officially closed orders in Japan, as it reached the planned sales amount. It was revealed the car was no longer in sale in North America and Africa, as Nissan USA, Nissan Canada, and Nissan South Africa official websites claimed the car was sold out.

Reintroduction

In October 2022, Nissan resumed production for the 2023 model year. Skipping the previous model year, the car was only offered in North America. No changes were reported compared to the previous model.

=== 2023 facelift ===
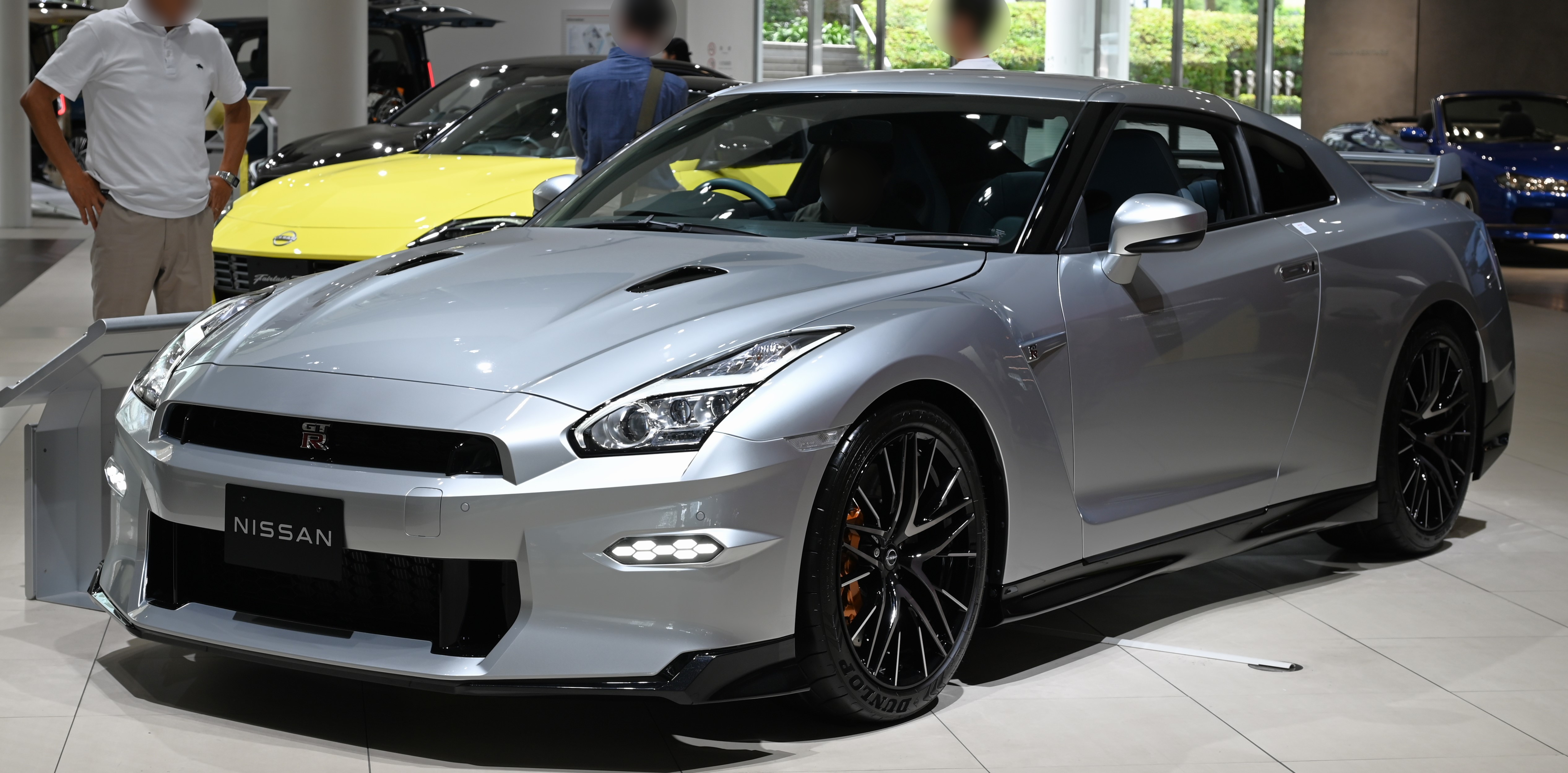

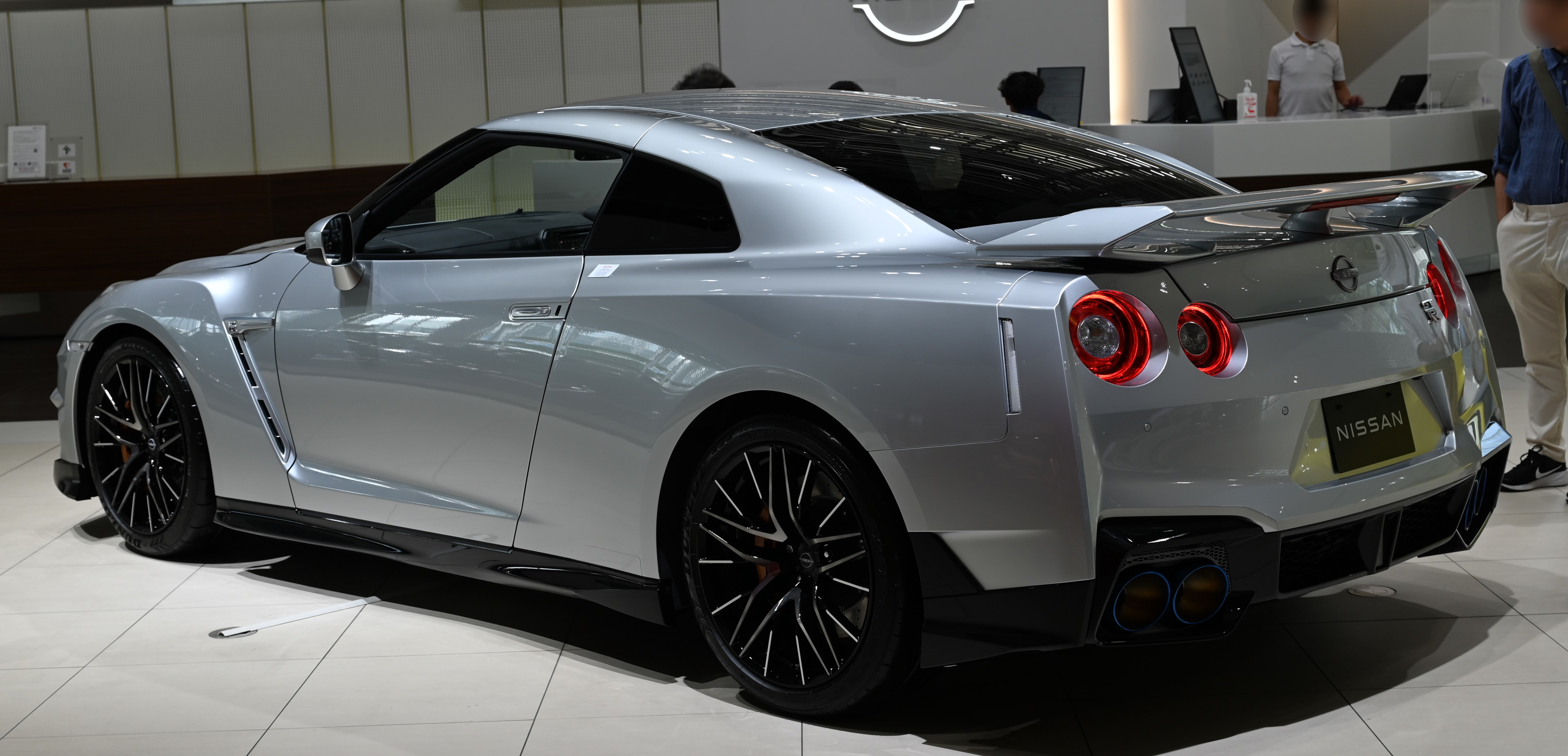
Facelifted 2023 (2024 model year) GT-R

The car received its third and final facelift in 2023, for the 2024 model year, introduced at the 2023 Tokyo Auto Salon. Nissan claimed the facelifted version would be limited to an unspecified number, and it was mainly offered only for the Japanese and North American markets, with three trim levels, Premium, Nismo and T-spec. The Track Edition variant was offered, exclusively in Japan. Unlike its previous facelifts, this model featured minor cosmetic changes. Redesigned front and rear bumpers, front grille and rear wing, improved aerodynamics around the nose and rear diffuser, which increased downforce without increasing drag. No mechanical changes were made over the previous model year. In the North American market, the facelifted Premium and Nismo variants went on sale in the second and third quarter of 2023 respectively. Sales in Japan began in March 20, 2023.

=== Discontinuation ===
Nissan announced the end of sales for the North American market in October 2024 with two exclusive variants, the T-Spec Takumi and Skyline limited editions. Production continued mainly for the Japanese market until August 26, 2025, when the final unit—a Premium T-Spec edition finished in Midnight Purple—rolled off the production line in Tochigi. Nissan officially announced the car's end of production, claimed the rising costs and stricter regulations invoked their decision, while also addressing the potential development of a next-generation GT-R.

=== Production figures ===
During its 18 year production span, Nissan had produced around 48,000 units and sold in various different markets worldwide.

Model year	North America	Japan	Europe	Australia
2009	3,158	5,902	—	—
2010	1,576	482	2,837	282
2011	368	224	769	76
2012	1,379	660	1,069	104
2013	1,566	569	1,078	82
2014	1,736	611	559	76
2015	1,816	741	778	53
2016	984	833	742	111
2017	1,318	1,660	1,866	155
2018	458	445	311	31
2019	245	448	435	19
2020	453	944	342	28
2021	384	790	200	36
2022	—	803	38	57
2023	270	—	—	—

== Overview ==
=== Technical specifications ===
Models (calendar years)	GT-R CBA–R35 (2007–2010)	GT-R DBA–R35 (2010–2016)	GT-R 4BA–R35 (2016–2025)
Configuration	3,799 cc (3.8 L) DOHC twin-turbocharged V6		
Power at rpm	480–485 PS (473–478 hp; 353–357 kW) at 6,400	530–550 PS (523–542 hp; 390–405 kW) at 6,400	570 PS (562 hp; 419 kW) at 6,800
Torque at rpm	583–588 N⋅m (430–434 lb⋅ft) at 3,200–5,200	607–628 N⋅m (448–463 lb⋅ft) at 3,200–5,800	633 N⋅m (467 lb⋅ft) at 3,300–5,800
Redline	7,000 rpm		7,100 rpm
Transmission	6-speed DCT		
Shift time	150–200 milliseconds		
Chassis	Nissan Premium Midship		
Kerb weight	1,740 kg (3,836 lb)	1,735–1,745 kg (3,825–3,847 lb)	1,785 kg (3,935 lb)
Weight distribution	54 : 46 (front : rear)		
Suspension	Bilstein, double wishbone (front), multi-link (rear), electronically adjustable dampers		
Brakes	Brembo, 6 (front), 4 (rear) piston calipers, full-floating, ventilated and drilled rotors		
Coefficient of drag	0.27 Cd	0.26 Cd	

=== Engine ===
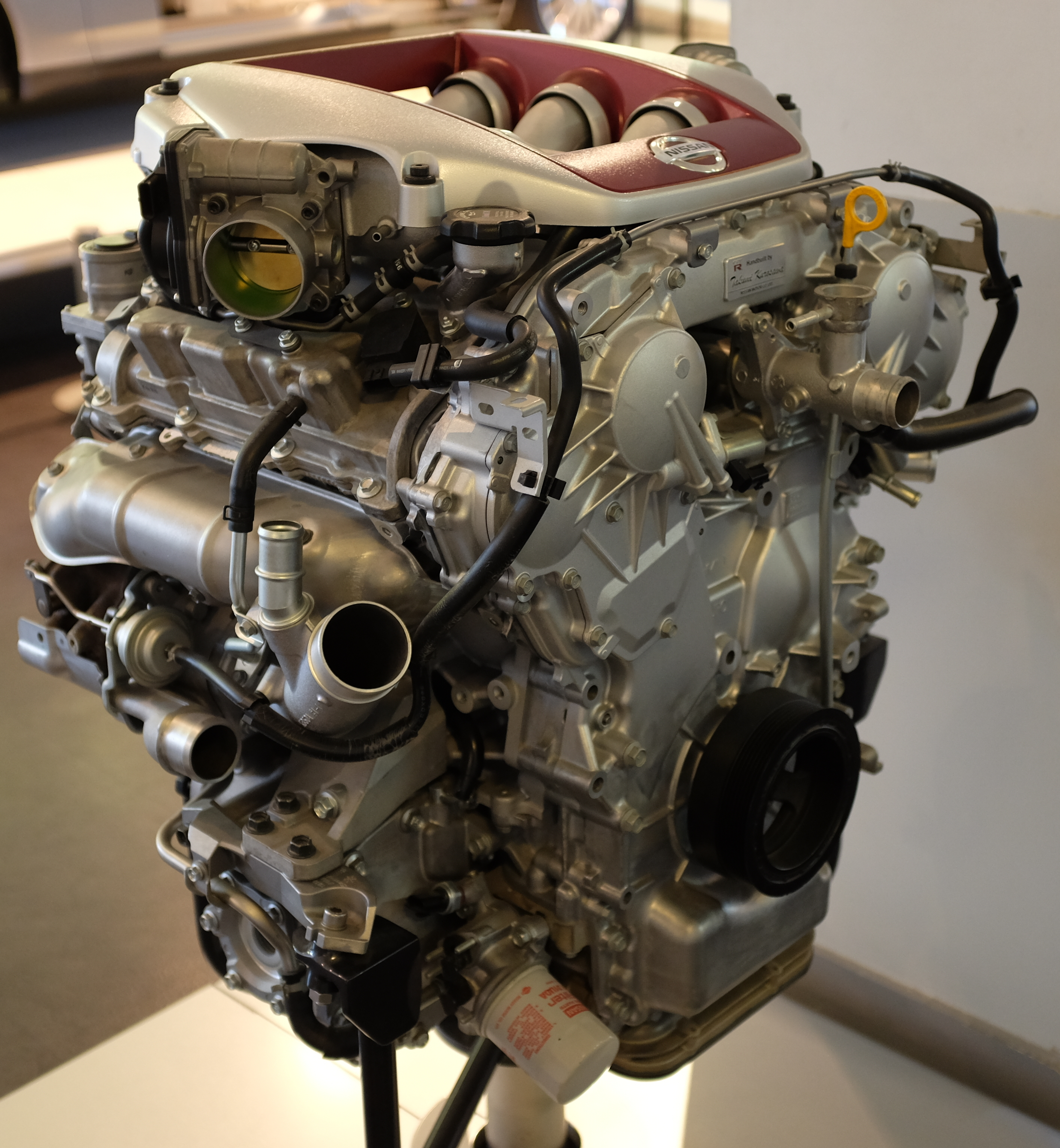
The VR38DETT engine

The GT-R was powered by the VR38DETT engine, a 3,799 cc (3.8 L; 231.8 cu in) 60° DOHC V6 engine – which was shorter than traditional V6 production engines, benefiting weight distribution. The engine was based on the VQ engine, but thoroughly modified to improve performance and suit the car. It featured an innovative hybrid wet/dry-sump pressurized lubrication system, controlled thermostatically to withstand high g-force and closed-deck construction increased stiffness. Cast iron cylinder liners were replaced by a 0.15 mm (0.0059 in) layer of plasma transferred wire arc sprayed cylinder bores, reducing friction for the piston rings to slide on smoothly. Two parallel Ishikawajima-Harima (IHI) RHF55 turbochargers provided forced induction, boosting more than 0.7 bar of boost and its turbine housing was integrated into the exhaust manifolds to minimize lag, decrease weight and improve vehicle balance. The engine was originally rated at 353 kW (473 hp) at 6,400 rpm and 583 N⋅m (430 lb⋅ft) of torque at 3,200–5,200 rpm, which made it the most powerful engine fitted to a Japanese production vehicle at the time. The engine was compliant with California Air Resources Board Ultra Low Emission Vehicle (ULEV) standards. It featured 24 valves controlled by dual overhead camshafts (2 per cylinder head) with intake only variable valve timing. It also featured a feedback control system which changes air fuel ratio depending on the engine load which reduces fuel consumption. Fully equipped with catalytic converters, turbochargers, engine accessories, front differential assembly and turbo outlet pipes, the engine weighed 276 kg (608 lb). Notable features of the VR38DETT include:

- Continuously variable valve timing control system (CVTCS) on intake valve.
- Aluminium cylinder block with high-endurance/low-friction plasma-sprayed bores.
- Iridium-tipped spark plugs.
- Electronic drive-by-wire throttle.
- Multi port fuel injection.
- Pressurized lubrication system with thermostatically controlled cooling and magnesium oil sump.
- Fully symmetrical dual intake and low back-pressure exhaust system.
- Secondary air intake system to rapidly heat catalysts to peak cleaning efficiency.
- 50 State LEV2/ULEV.

VR38DETT engine note

The engines were hand built in a dust proof, temperature controlled room at Nissan's Yokohama plant, by only nine "Takumi Craftsmen" mechanics throughout the car's 18 year production span. Names of these mechanics were badged on every engine built. Each engine took approximately 6 hours and 300 components to be fully assembled. Approximately 13 engines were built per day in a single shift. The cars were built at Tochigi plant on a shared production line. At the end of the production process, the cars were test driven by professional drivers around Nissan's test track.

Model	Year	Output	Torque	Source
CBA–R35	2007–2009	353 kW (480 PS; 473 hp) at 6,400 rpm	583 N⋅m (430 lb⋅ft) at 3,200–5,200 rpm	
CBA–R35	2009–2010	357 kW (485 PS; 478 hp) at 6,400 rpm	588 N⋅m (434 lb⋅ft) at 3,200–5,200 rpm	
DBA–R35	2010–2012	390 kW (530 PS; 523 hp) at 6,400 rpm	607 N⋅m (448 lb⋅ft) at 3,200–5,200 rpm	
DBA–R35	2012–2016	405 kW (550 PS; 542 hp) at 6,400 rpm	628 N⋅m (463 lb⋅ft) at 3,200–5,800 rpm	
4BA–R35	2016–2025	419 kW (570 PS; 562 hp) at 6,800 rpm	633 N⋅m (467 lb⋅ft) at 3,300–5,800 rpm	

=== Drivetrain ===
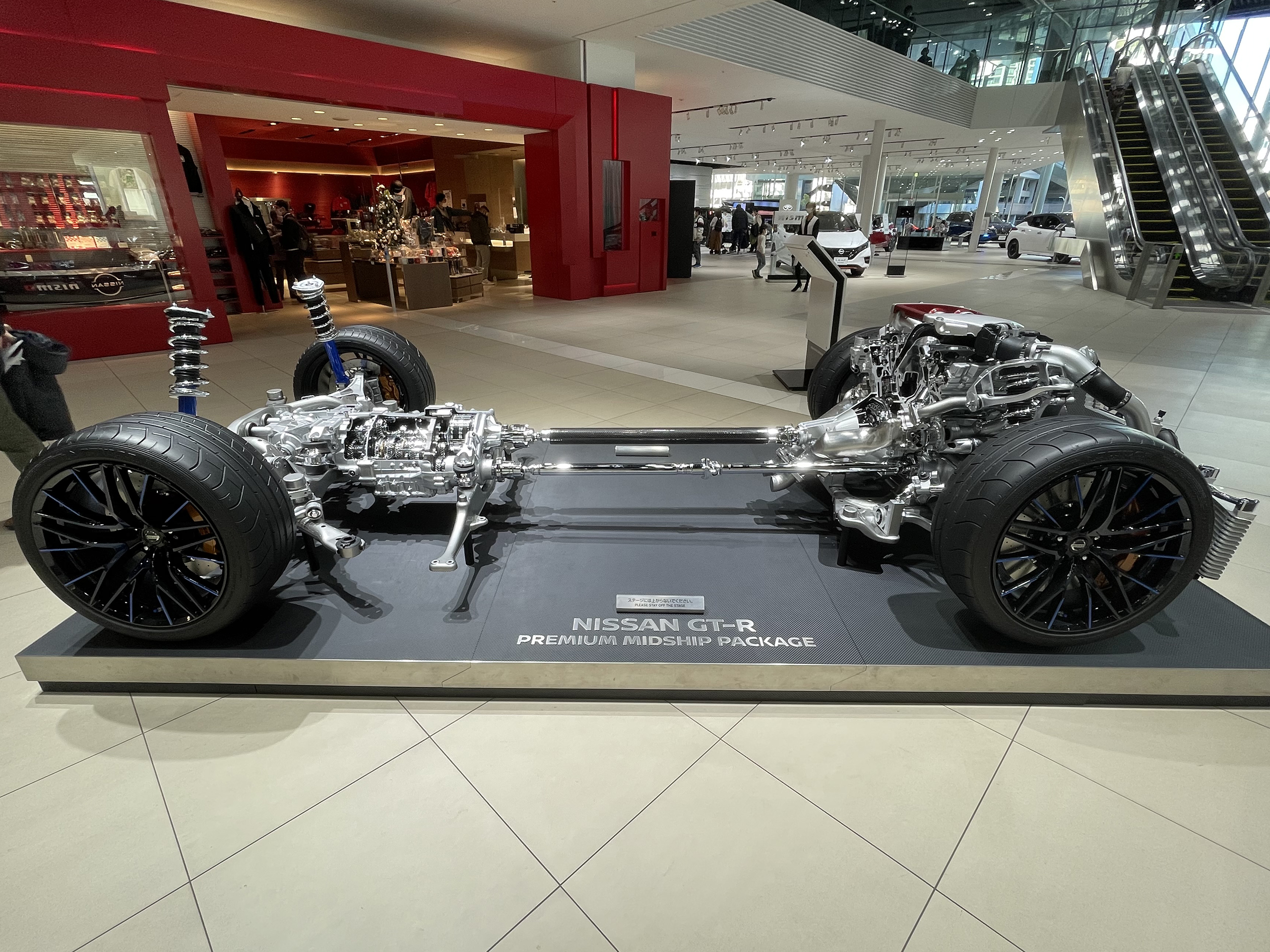
ATTESA E-TS Pro all-wheel-drive system

The GT-R was the first ever rear mounted independent transaxle all-wheel-drive vehicle. The transaxle consist of the transmission, clutches, centre and rear differential. Placed on the rear axle, it helped balance the weight of the engine up front and improved the front-to-rear weight distribution to 54:46. The car featured an exclusively developed, six-speed BorgWarner co-designed GR6Z30A type dual-clutch transmission. It was hand built by Takumi Craftsmen in a specialized room, similar to the engine assembly room, at Nissan's Aichi Kikai plant in Nagoya. With a shift time of 0.15–0.2 seconds, it was one of the fastest gear shifting transmissions fitted to a production vehicle. Nissan claimed their choice of a DCT over the traditional manual transmission was because of its significant performance advantage, high demand, better fuel efficiency, favouring the advanced technologies featured in the car, and being the precise choice for meeting regulation and emission standards. It was used in conjunction with the unique ATTESA E-TS Pro all-wheel-drive system, providing power to all four wheels with minimal loss and controlled by the built-in Vehicle Dynamics Control (VDC) to aid in handling and stability. Three shift modes were available in the drive mode selector: "R-mode" provided maximum performance of the six-speed dual-clutch transmission, "Normal-mode" was recommended for daily driving, and "Save-mode" was recommended for maximizing fuel economy, and driving on slippery surfaces, such as on snow or ice. Gear shifting was controlled automatically or rather manually through paddle shifters.

The ATTESA ET-S Pro all-wheel-drive system used in the GT-R, was a different implementation to the version used in Skyline GT-R models. Unlike the previous versions which relied heavily on mechanical feedback, this updated system used hydraulically actuated clutches and electronic sensors. It was a rear biased all-wheel-drive system, providing incredible handling and stability at high speeds. In normal conditions, it sent 100 percent power to the rear wheels through the main carbon-composite propeller shaft. In situations with limited traction available to the rear wheels, such as in heavy acceleration and cornering, the separated additional propeller shaft sent torque from the transfer case to the front differential, resulting in a 50:50 front to rear power distribution. An open type differential distributed power in the front, and a 1.5 way multi-disc mechanical limited-slip differential did so in the rear. In addition to these mechanical components, the car was also capable of managing slip angles. Automatically braking either of the front wheels occurs when slip is detected in order to send power to the other front wheel, so as to mimic the functionality of a mechanical limited slip differential. The Vehicle Dynamic Control (VDC), was offered with three different modes: "R-mode" for performance driving conditions such as on track and dragstrip, lowering traction control sensitivity but did not fully turn off, "Normal-mode" for daily driver use, and "Off-mode" which turned off both traction control and electronic stability control entirely.

=== Chassis ===
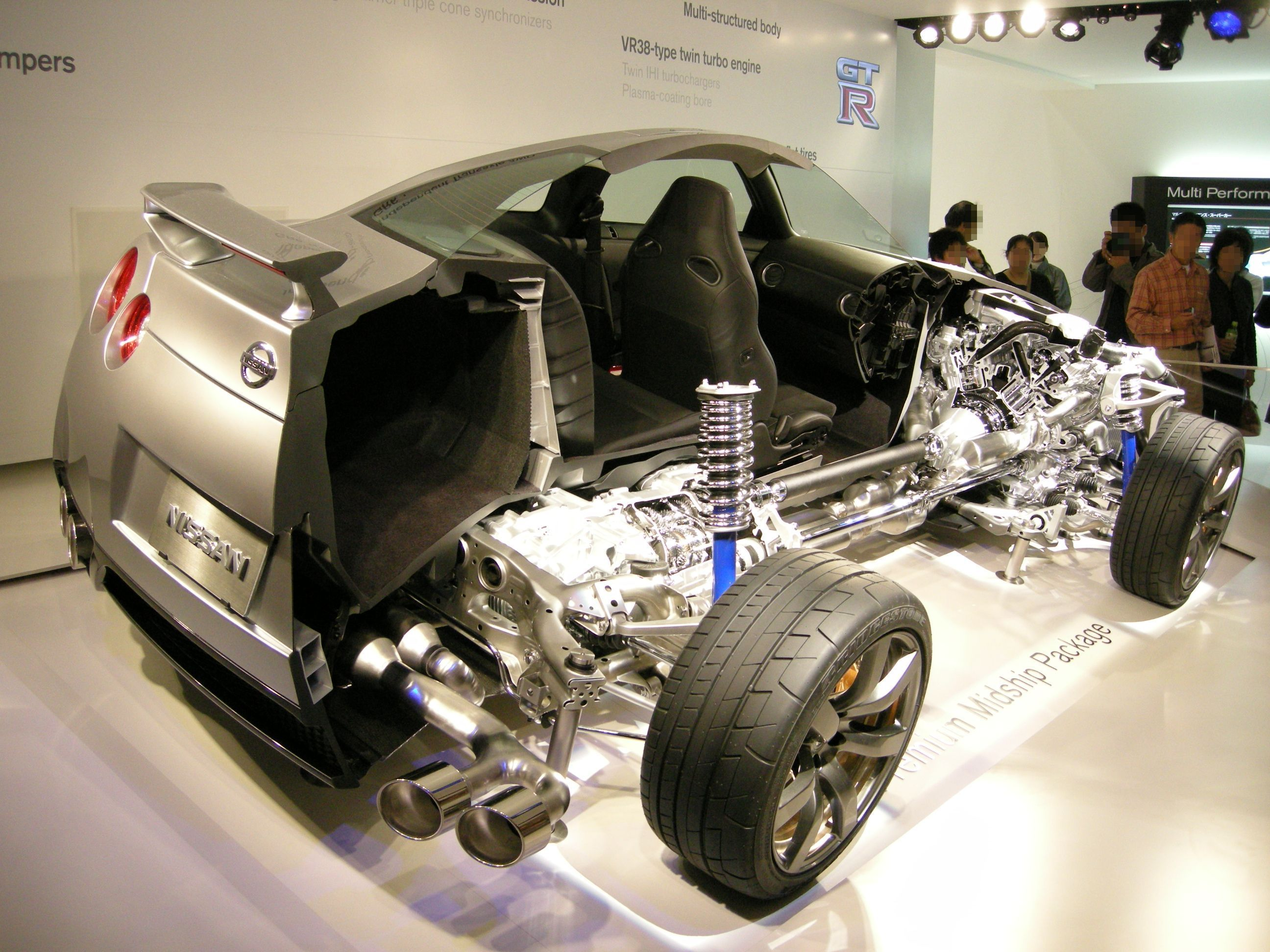
GT-R cutaway model, showing Nissan Premium Midship platform

The GT-R had a kerb weight of 1,740–1,785 kg (3,837–3,935 lb) distributed 54 percent to the front and 46 percent to the rear, providing greater stability. It was the first and so far the only model built on the Premium Midship (PM) platform, an evolution of the Front Midship (FM) architecture introduced in the Skyline (V35)/Infiniti G35. Its chassis utilized a hybrid unibody construction using a combination of steel, carbon fibre, and die-cast aluminium. It primarily used a conventional steel monocoque but with Alcoa aluminium subframes and suspensions. The door frames were die-cast aluminium, and the bumpers were made of lightweight polypropylene. The front cross-member, radiator support and rear diffuser were made of carbon-fibre to strengthen the structure and reduce weight. The majority of body panels were made of aluminium sheets, such as the bonnet, boot lid and door shells. Outer body panels were stamped using a multiple-strike coining process in order to add rigidity and precision.

The car was fitted with an active suspension system, called "DampTronic", which contained Bilstein designed electronic adaptive dampers and manufactured by Yorozu Corporation. Onboard computers adjust the suspension components every one hundredth of a second, evenly distributing the mass for all four wheels and maximizing tyre contact for better grip, under heavy acceleration, braking and cornering. The GT-R was the first production vehicle to feature such a suspension system. The DampTronic system allowed the driver to select three different suspension modes from the mode selector: "R-mode" for maximum performance required on track and dragstrip, "Normal-mode" for daily driver use, and "Comfort-mode", which softened the dampers to improve ride quality. The car featured 20-inch 15-spoke forged lightweight aluminium alloy wheels manufactured by Rays, wrapped up with exclusively developed Dunlop SP Sport Maxx GT 600 DSST CTT run-flat tyres, Bridgestone Potenza RE070R run-flat tyres were offered in earlier models. Each wheel featured a knurling around the inside of the rim in order to keep the tyres from slipping on the rim due to heavy acceleration and braking. The brake setup featured Brembo monoblock six-piston ventilated brake callipers with 390 mm (15.35 in) at the front, and four-piston callipers with 381 mm (15.0 in) full floating, cross drilled two piece rotors in the rear. They accompanied with low steel and high stiffness brake pads. Carbon ceramic rotors were offered in some of the special variants, which were the largest brake rotors ever fitted to a Japanese production vehicle.

=== Exterior ===
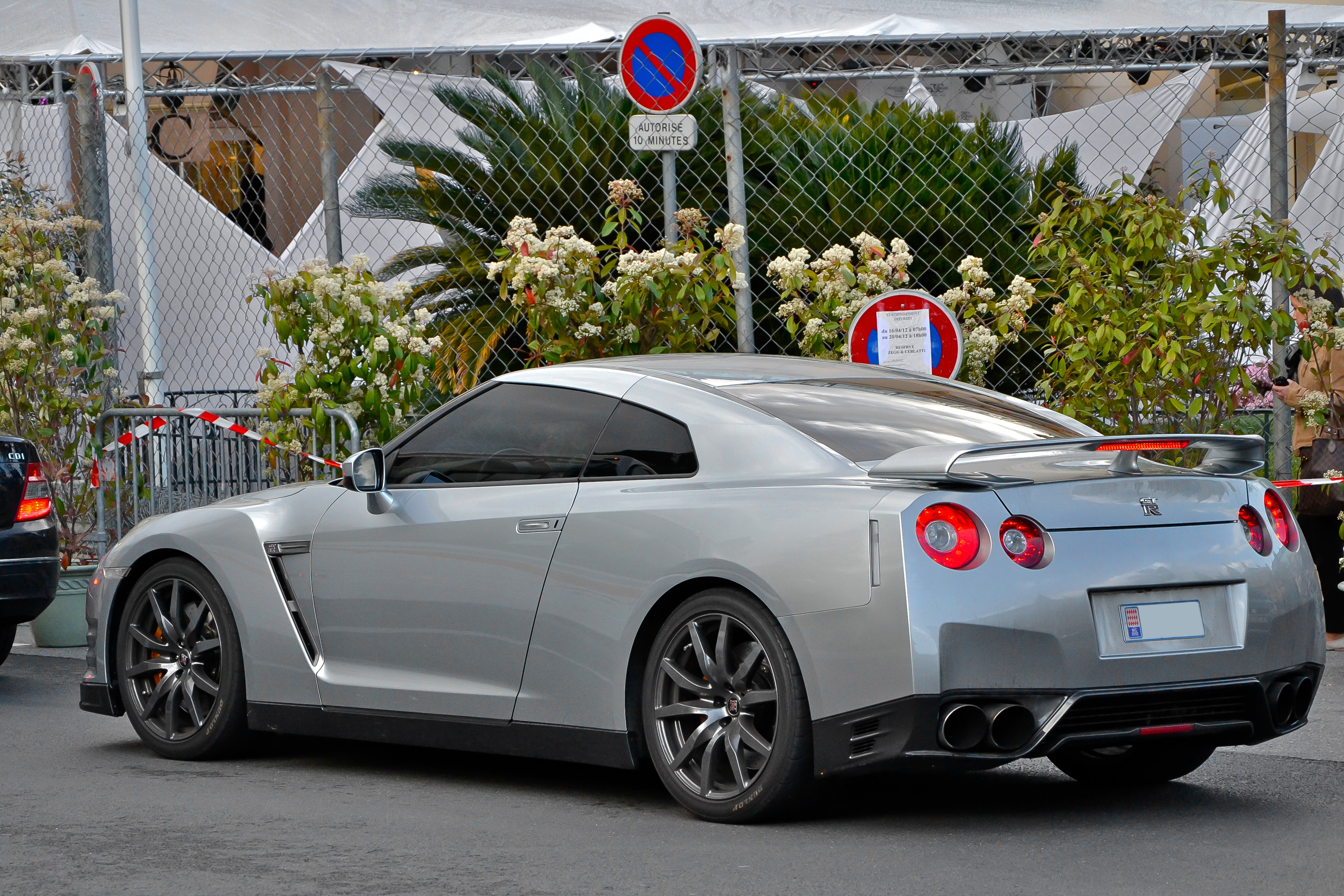
Rear view of the GT-R, showing signature four round taillights, first offered in 1972 on the Skyline C110

According to chief design director, Shiro Nakamura, "aero blade" front fenders, blackened A-pillars and the slopping roofline of the GT-R were inspired by the giant robots of the Gundam series. Nakamura stated: "The GT-R is unique because it is not simply a copy of a European-designed sports car; it had to really reflect Japanese culture". Nissan's American designers sculpted the rear three-quarters of the vehicle, while their European designers sculpted the roofline. Nissan developed a 6-stage paint process with a double clear coat and chip-resistant paint for use in critical areas of the chassis. An optional liquid-effect finish employed a hand-polished 8-stage process with product-specific colours, such as the original Super Silver metallic paint, with three layers of clearcoat.

The car featured an overall muscular, sharp and a boxy body design. Despite being a bulkier body design compared to its rivals, it was high-downforce and less–drag through its smoother air flow over the overall body. Up front, NACA ducts on the hood scooped in clean air in order cool the engine compartment. Side front fender air vents also improved the airflow around the tyres, while cooling the engine. Front bumper edges were sharpened and featured air ducts and vents to improve downforce while cooling the brakes. Overall front end of the car featured an aggressive look, the rear end carries on the signature four round taillights from its predecessors. The rear end also featured air ducts and vents for further brake cooling and generated a smoother air flow to minimize drag. A body-coloured rear spoiler, whereas some special editions featured a dry carbon-fibre rear spoiler, in order improve rear downforce. The car featured a 315-litre rear boot, an under body made out of carbon-fibre panels, smoothens the air flow under the car. The car was fitted with LED headlights, automatic on/off headlights, LED daytime running lights, LED taillights and brake lights, dual-heated body-colour power wing mirrors, power-folding side mirrors, flush-mounted aluminium door handles, four 5-inch titanium exhaust outlets with polished tips and UV-reducing solar glass. The GT-R generated more than 80 kg (176 lb) of downforce at 300 km/h (186 mph) on both ends, while maintaining a drag coefficient of Cd=0.26–0.27. Becoming the first production car to feature such an aerodynamic efficiency.

=== Interior ===
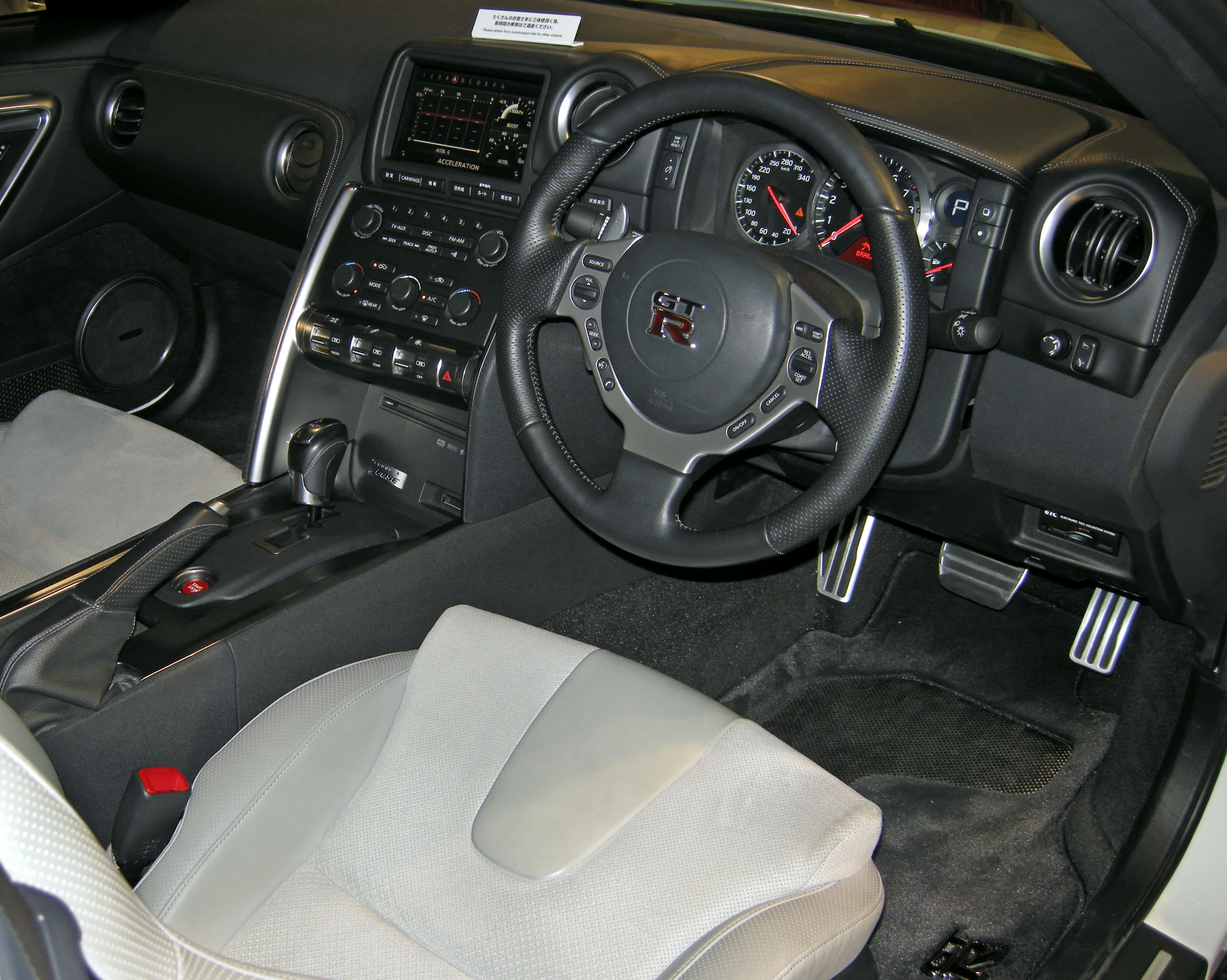
Interior (pre-facelift)

The GT-R featured a hand stitched premium leather interior, embedded on the dashboard, steering wheel, door panels, centre console and seats. Motor Trend claimed the car featured one of the most finely crafted interiors despite its marginally lower price. Carbon-fibre was used in the centre console and in the gauge cluster, which featured an analog speedometer, fuel meter and tachometer with a redline of 7,000–7,100 rpm. Digital displays featured traveling speed, gear, fuel economy and distance calculations. GT-R badged steering wheel contains volume controls and cruise control buttons. Magnesium paddle shifters were on the wheel column in earlier models and on the steering wheel in post 2017 facelifted models. The instrument cluster was angled towards the driver, featuring air conditioning controls, audio set-up controls and drive mode selectors. Centre console featured the engine start/off button, leather–wrapped shift lever, parking brake and an armrest with a small storage area inside and a USB port. The car was fitted with an 11-speaker Bose sound system.

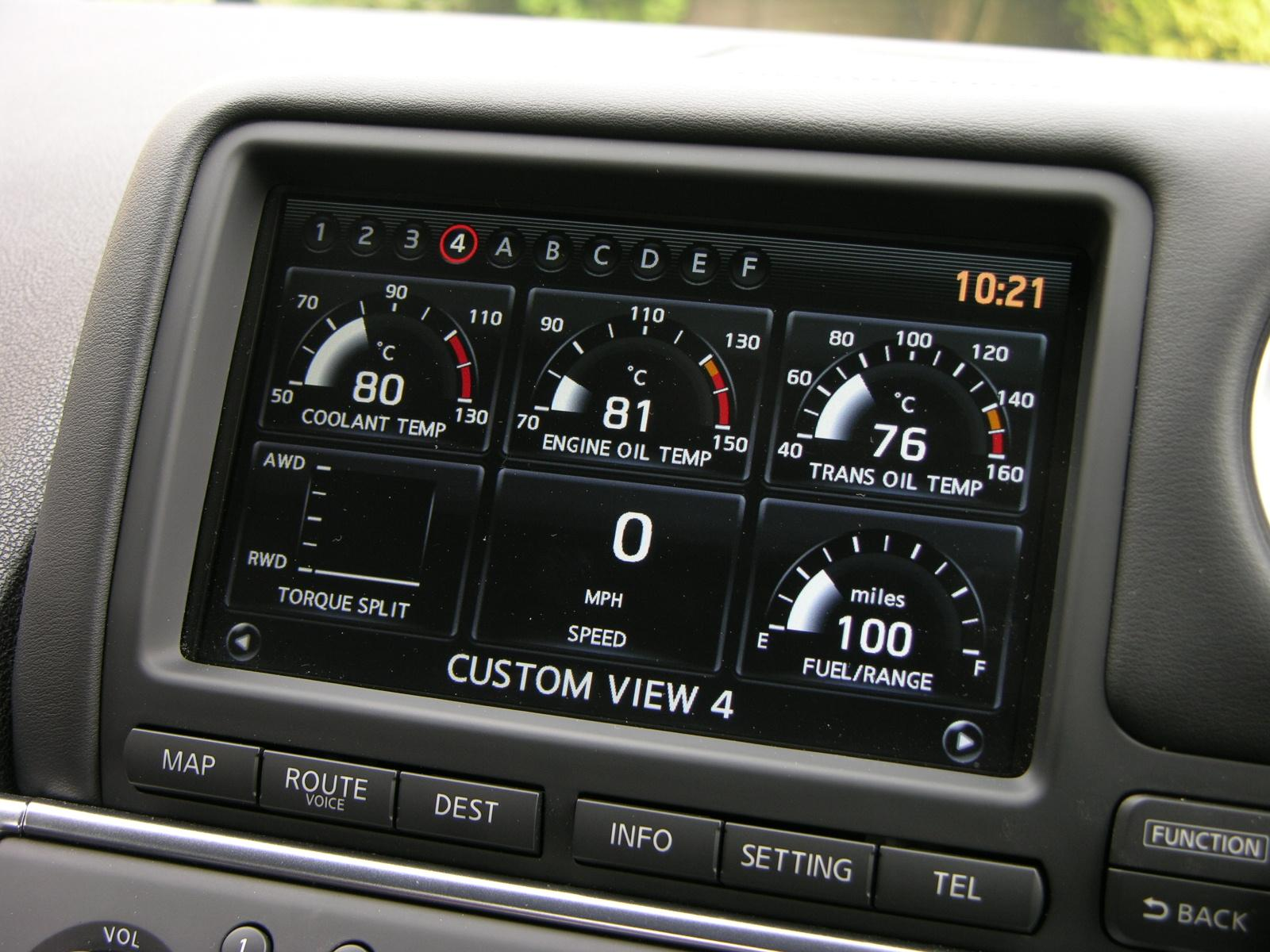
The customizable multifunction display integrated into the dash, had its roots in the Skyline GT-R R34

Polyphony Digital, creators of the Gran Turismo sim racing video games, were contracted to design the multifunction display. It featured a detailed log of the driving behavior, speed, g-force, fuel economy and more. Details of mechanical information such as the turbo boost, water and engine oil pressure, transmission oil, front and rear drive distribution, steering angles, braking and acceleration pressure, and optimal gearshift mapping for better fuel economy, satellite navigation and audio controls as well.

== Variants ==
Alongside the standard model, four distinct trim levels were introduced over time, each bringing notable performance improvements and cosmetic updates. The lineup began with the Black Edition in 2012, followed by the track-focused Track Edition in 2013, Nismo in 2014, and T-spec trim in 2021.

=== Trim Levels ===
Name	Photos (calendar years)	Upgrades (over the standard car)	Notes
Black Edition		2013–2015: Rays lightweight wheels; Carbon-fibre rear spoiler; Recaro bucket seats; Red and black leather interior; "Pale Ivory" interior (Optional)	The first trim level introduced for the GT-R, upgrades offered improved handling similar to the GT-R SpecV. It was re-introduced in 2016, only with the bucket seats, and was primarily sold in Japan and United Kingdom.
Track Edition	2013 2016 2023	2013–2015: Deletion of back seats; Rays lightweight wheels; Carbon-fibre rear spoiler; Re-tuned suspension setup; Carbon-fibre air inlets; Titanium exhaust; Unique front spoiler; Recaro bucket seats; Black and grey leather interior; 2016 update: Facelift design elements; Interior changes to red and black leather; Other upgrades preserved unchanged from previous year; 2019 update: GT-R Nismo engine (producing 441 kW; 592 hp (600 PS) and 652 N⋅m (481 lb⋅ft) of torque); Wider front fenders; New Rays lightweight wheels; Nismo-spec Dunlop tyres; Carbon-ceramic brakes; Other upgrades preserved unchanged from previous year; 2023 update: Facelift design elements; Other upgrades preserved unchanged from previous year	A limited trim level, also known as the "GT-R Track Edition Engineered by Nismo" in Japan, it featured improved handling, cornering, and acceleration compared to the standard model. From the update in 2019, acceleration reaction time was improved by 20 percent. It originally had a kerb weight of 1,720 kg (3,792 lb), later years weighed up to 1,760 kg (3,880 lb).
Nismo	2013 2016 2019 2023	2013–2015: Increased power output to 600 PS (441 kW; 592 hp) and 652 N⋅m (481 lb⋅ft) of torque due to, larger turbochargers from the GT3 race car, revised ignition timing and an upgraded fuel pump; Larger front splitter with enhanced brake cooling ducts; Larger diffuser with enhanced brake cooling ducts; Carbon-fibre rear wing; Nismo-tuned suspension setup with re-valved Bilstein dampers; Geometry revisions for front wheels; 17.3 mm (0.68 in) rear stabilizer bar; Rays lightweight wheels; Nismo-spec Dunlop tyres; Full carbon-fibre panels for boot lid, bonnet and bumpers; Additional spot welds for the chassis; Titanium exhaust system with additional heatsinks; Alcantara synthetic suede covered Recaro bucket seats, instrument binnacle and steering wheel; Deletion of active noise control in the Bose stereo system; 2016 update: Facelift design elements; Other upgrades preserved unchanged from previous year; 2019 update: New Rays lightweight wheels; Revised Dunlop tyres; Upgraded turbochargers; Re-tuned suspension setup; GT3-inspired fender vents; Carbon-fibre panels for the roof and front fenders; Carbon-ceramic brakes (largest rotors ever-fitted to a Japanese production car); Other upgrades preserved unchanged from previous year; 2023 update: Facelift design elements; Mechanical limited-slip differential for the front; Larger swan neck rear wing; Revised front lip canards and rear diffuser; Enhanced carbon-fibre bucket seats; Nismo Appearance Package was offered; Other upgrades preserved unchanged from previous year	A higher-powered and track focused GT-R Nismo was announced in February 2013 to be available for consumers in the near future. Then CEO, Carlos Ghosn insisted that the car should set the lap record for mass-produced cars at the Nürburgring Nordschleife before its official launch. In May, development begun with Nismo engineers and drivers from the GT3 racing program. Numerous testing sessions took place in the Sendai Hi-Land Raceway and Nürburgring. At the end of September, development was finalized and the car set a lap time of 7:08.679 minutes. The GT-R Nismo officially made its public debut at the 2013 Tokyo Motor Show. It offered improved handling and acceleration, providing 100 kg (220 lb) more downforce at 300 km/h (186 mph) compared to the standard car, and chassis rigidity was improved by 8 percent. Kerb weight was reduced to 1,730 kg (3,814 lb). 2019 update further improved the performance of the car. More downforce, acceleration from 0 to 80 km/h (0 to 50 mph) was quicker by 2.4 m (8 ft), and the Nürburgring lap time was claimed to be 5 seconds quicker compared to the previous year, due to a 5 percent improvement in cornering force and braking performance. Kerb weight was rated at 1,750 kg (3,858 lb). This upgraded version was 2.5 seconds quicker than the previous year around their test track. 2023 update saw major performance upgrades. Cornering was improved with increased downforce by 13 percent over the previous year. The Nismo Appearance Package offered special exterior features of the GT-R Nismo Special Edition. This included the exclusive Stealth Grey body colour, clear coated carbon-fibre hood, exclusive engine cover and the red-accented Nismo wheels.
T-spec	(Gold and black engine cover) 2021 2023 (Interior)	2021–2022: Millennium Jade and Midnight Purple body colours, used in the Skyline GT-R; Gold and black engine cover; Bronze Rays lightweight wheels; Carbon-fibre rear spoiler; Air inlets; Wider front fenders; Nismo-spec Dunlop tyres; Carbon-ceramic brakes; Titanium exhaust; Unique front spoiler; Increased wheel-rim width; Carbon-fibre roof (and boot lid only for the Track Edition T-spec); Increased use of leather and Alcantara suede finished in Mori Green; 2023 update: Facelift design elements; Nismo-tuned Vehicle Dynamic Control; Other upgrades preserved unchanged from previous year	A high-performance variant, inspired by the words "Trend Maker" and "Traction Master" used to represent the first GT-R concept back in 2001. This trim was offered for both standard and Track Edition trims. It received the final facelift introduced in 2023, replacing the Track Edition in the North American market.

N-Attack Package

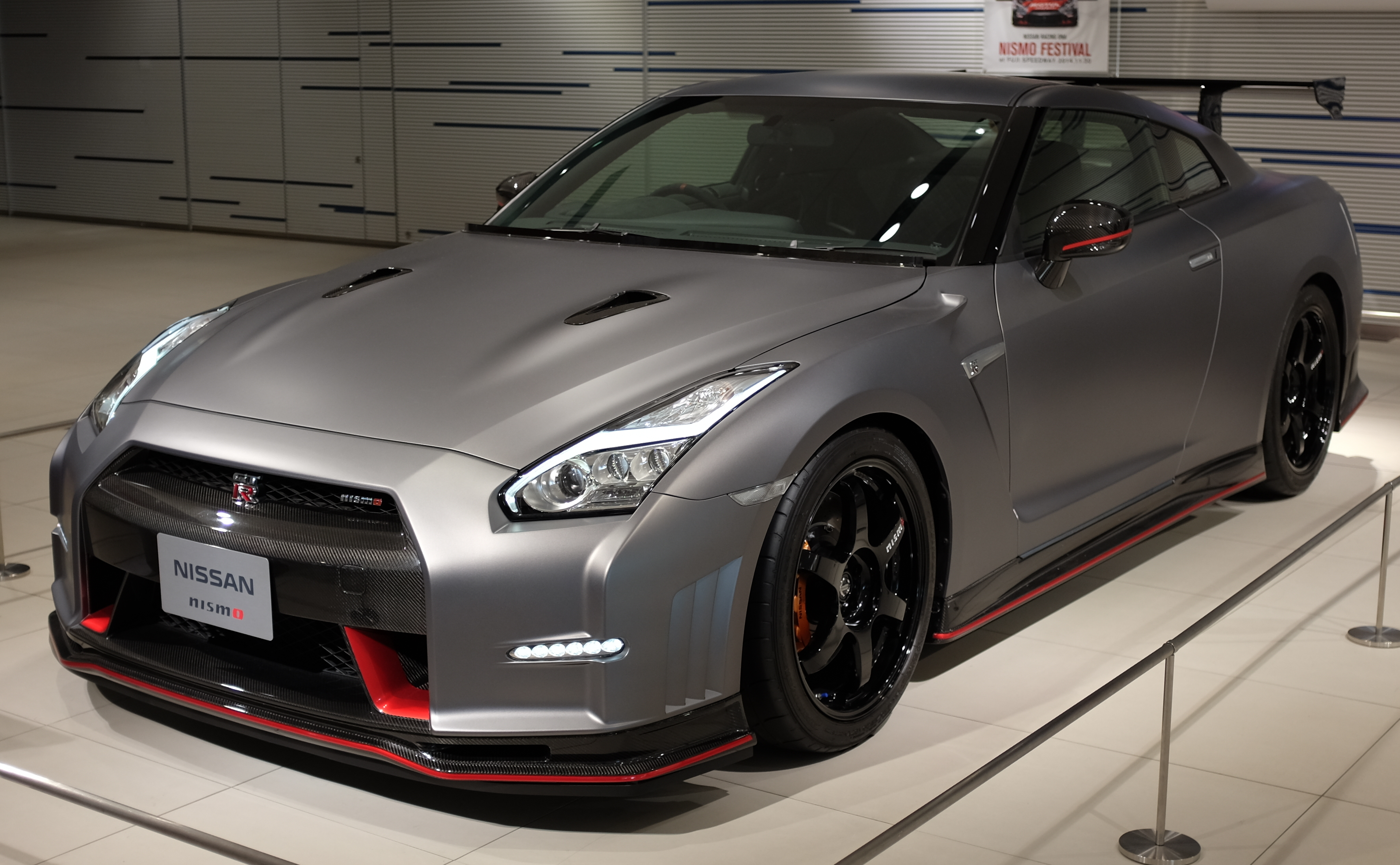

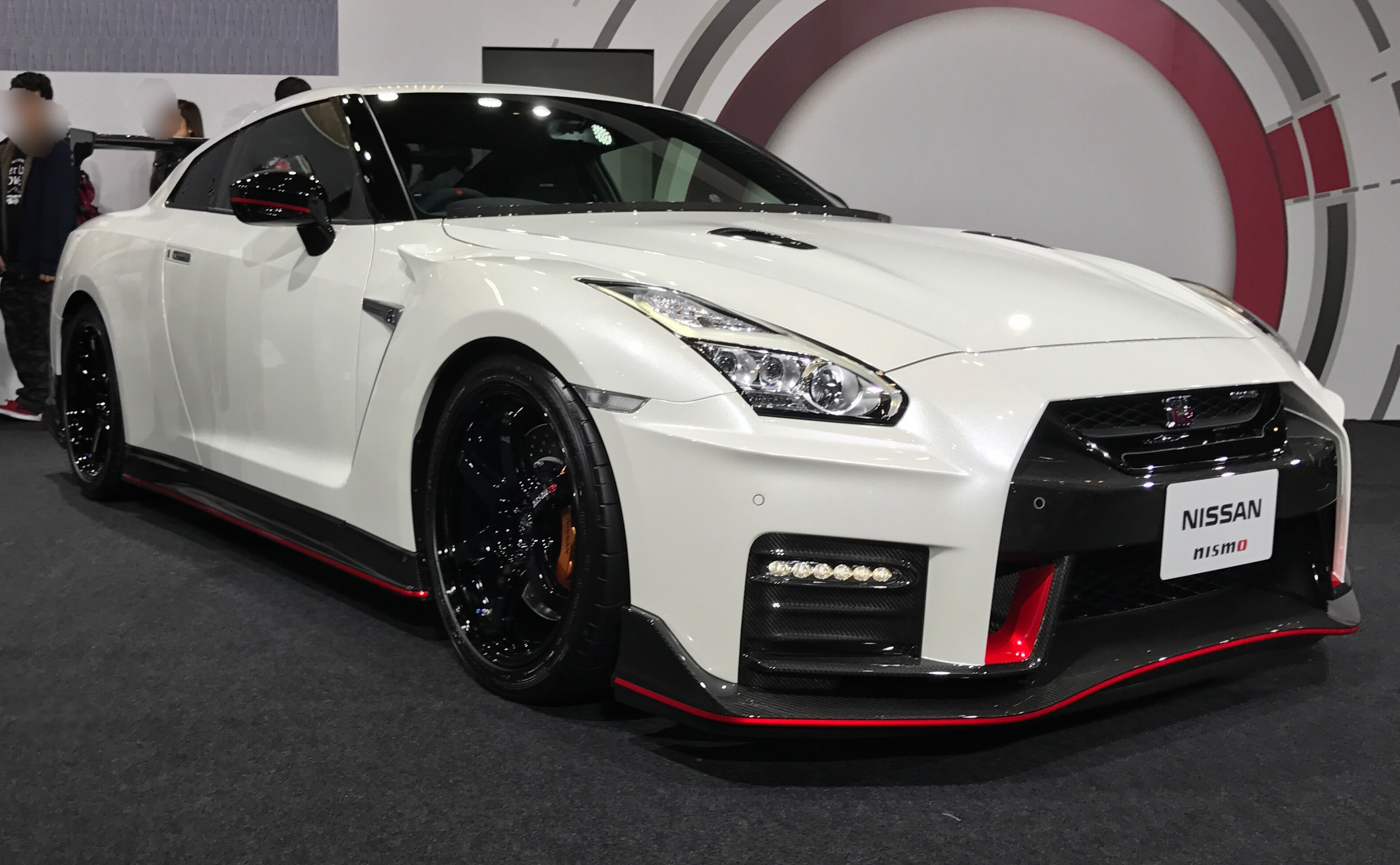
2013–2016 (top) and 2016–2019 (bottom) GT-R Nismo N-Attack

The GT-R Nismo was offered with the N-Attack Package, a special post-production performance package, which included the performance upgrades used to set the lap record at the Nürburgring. It featured a re-programmed ECU for enhanced power distribution. Changes were made to stiffer suspension springs and shock absorbers, anti-roll bars, front brake pads, front and rear limited-slip differentials for improved handling. It provided more downforce using carbon-fibre front fenders with aerodynamic flics, larger front splitter and rear wing with two height and 12 angle adjustment options. Carbon-fibre intercooler pipes, Recaro full-carbon bucket seats and a carbon-fibre bulkhead replacing the back seats reduced weight by 64 kg (141 lb) over the standard GT-R Nismo. It also contained track-only components, the bonnet gurney strip and six-point harness seat belt which were offered as optional parts. The package was offered for the 2016 facelifted models as well. The package was offered in two trim levels, A kit and B kit. The A kit included all the upgrades, but the B kit only featured the suspension setup, brake system, stabilizer bars, carbon-fibre rear wing, front fenders and splitter, both ESM and TCM, and a driver only bucket seat. In Japan, installation was handled by the Nismo Omori factory. In North America and the United Kingdom, the conversion was handled by Stillen and JR Motorsports respectively.

=== Special Editions ===
Several special editions were introduced during the GT-R's prolonged production span, highlighted unique designs, limited production runs, and commemorated milestones of its history. Each edition featured distinctive characteristics, ranging from performance upgrades to exclusive cosmetic enhancements.

Name	Photos	Exclusive features	Notes
SpecV	(GT-R SpecV) (SpecV badging)	LAC Black Opal body colour; Larger turbochargers; Deletion of rear seats; Black engine cover; Rays lightweight wheels; Carbon-fibre rear spoiler, front-grille and brake ducts; Titanium exhaust system; Re-tuned suspension setup; Bridgestone Potenza RE070R street tyres with stiffer side walls; Carbon-ceramic brakes; Unique front spoiler	First special edition introduced for the GT-R, ("V" stands for "Victory") at the 2009 Tokyo Auto Salon. Kerb weight was reduced by 60 kg (132 lb), rated at 1,680 kilograms (3,704 lb)–making it the lightest GT-R (R35) ever built. It featured an over boost button on the steering wheel, which could over boost the engine for up to 80 seconds and increase mid-range torque to 609 N⋅m (449 lb⋅ft). The suspension setup was 20 percent stiffer than the standard car. It offered more edgier handling and was more sensitive to driver input. A total of 110 units were built. Later, Nismo introduced the "Track Pack" package for the standard car, which provided the upgraded accessories of the SpecV.
Egoist	(GT-R Egoist) (Egoist badging) (Interior)	Rays lightweight wheels; Carbon-fibre rear spoiler; Titanium muffler; Leather and Alcantara suede for the instrument panel, console, door trim, rear side, pillar trim and roof trim; Car verification case	A limited luxury version, known as the VVIP Edition in the Middle East. 12 exclusive interior colour options, fabric carpets, and leather cleaners were offered for an enhanced interior quality. A total of 43 units sold worldwide.
Gentleman Edition		Grey Squale body colour; "Gentleman Edition" badges next front fender vents; Amber red leather upholstery; Individually numbered titanium plaque; Hand-stitched leather accents; Bespoke sunglass case	A limited variant based on the Black Edition, sold exclusively in France and Belgium. Only 10 units were built, making it the rarest GT-R to date.
Midnight Opal Special Edition		Midnight Opal body colour; "Carbon-fibre rear spoiler; Rays lightweight wheels finished in Hyper Titanium colour; Gold aluminium VIN plate; New SRS curtain airbag system; Increased antifreeze concentration	Limited to 115 units worldwide.
45th Anniversary Gold Edition		Gold "Silica Brass" body colour from Skyline GT-R R34 M-Spec; Rays lightweight wheels finished in black; Gold aluminium VIN plate; Production number plate under the hood; Commemorative plaque on the centre console	A limited production variant, 80 units produced worldwide, introduced to celebrate the 45th anniversary of the GT-R brand.
GT-R50	(The GT-R50)	Redesigned aluminium and carbon-fibre overall body; Increased power output of 720 PS (530 kW; 710 hp) and 780 N⋅m (575 lb⋅ft) of torque due to larger turbochargers, heavy-duty crankshaft, pistons, connecting rods, modified intake system and upgraded exhaust system; Recalibrated gearbox; Reinforced differential; Active rear wing; 21-inch carbon-fibre wheels; Michelin Pilot Super Sport tyres; Re-tuned suspension setup; Carbon-ceramic brakes; Stretched LED headlamps; "Samurai blade" cooling ducts	A high-performance variant, celebrating the 50th anniversary of the GT-R brand, limited to 50 units. Built in collaboration with Italdesign, as they celebrated their 50th anniversary as well in 2018. Nissan's European and American designers were also involved in its design, the car was described as a "car within a car", as the front and back ends were designed to be emerging from the bodywork. Production version of the GT-R50 was unveiled in May 2020, in Italy.
Naomi Osaka Edition	(Ivory interior colour option)	Midnight Opal, Brilliant White Pearl and Meteor Flake Black Pearl body colours; "Carbon-fibre rear spoiler; Privacy glasses; Gold aluminium VIN plate; Dark grey front fender outlet ducts; Increased antifreeze concentration; Ivory, Amber Red and Tan interior options with Urban Black colour seats	Limited to 50 units, celebrating the partnership with Nissan brand ambassador, Naomi Osaka. Both exterior and interior colour options were chosen by Osaka herself.
50th Anniversary Edition	(50th Anniversary Edition) (Interior)	Bayside (Wangan) Blue with white racing stripes (with blue accents on the wheel spokes), Pearl White with red stripes and Super Silver with white stripes two-tone body colours; Unique steering wheel and shift knob trim; Special embossed seats; Alcantara-wrapped sun visors and headliner with unique stitching	Celebrating the 50th anniversary of the GT-R brand, body colours offered which were used in the Skyline GT-R KPGC10 race cars that dominated the Japan GP series in the 1970s.
Nismo Special Edition	(Nismo Special Edition)	Stealth Gray body colour; High-precision weight-balanced engine components (piston rings, connecting rods, flywheel, crank pulley and valve springs with tighter tolerances); Carbon-fibre bonnet, inspired by Skyline GT-R R34 V-Spec N1 models (reducing 100g of weight); Red accents around the wheels; Red colour Takumi certification plate on the engine	Known as the "GT-R Nismo SV" in Japan and Australia, it is limited to 300 units worldwide. It was the first GT-R variant to adorn the new Nissan logo. High-precision engine components provided snappier revs and quicker turbo spooling.
T-spec Takumi Edition		Midnight Purple body colour; Engine badge with red-etched writing; Gold aluminium VIN plate; Other upgrades preserved unchanged from the T-spec trim	Exclusive to the North American market, to mark the end of sales, and both models were limited to fewer than 200 units. T-spec Takumi Edition paid homage to Takumi master craftsmen, responsible for assembling GT-R engines. The Skyline Edition was based on the standard car, bringing the Skyline name first time for the North American market.
Skyline Edition	(Skyline Edition) (Sora Blue interior)	Bayside Blue body colour; Sora Blue interior colour	Exclusive to the North American market, to mark the end of sales, and both models were limited to fewer than 200 units. T-spec Takumi Edition paid homage to Takumi master craftsmen, responsible for assembling GT-R engines. The Skyline Edition was based on the standard car, bringing the Skyline name first time for the North American market.

=== One-offs ===
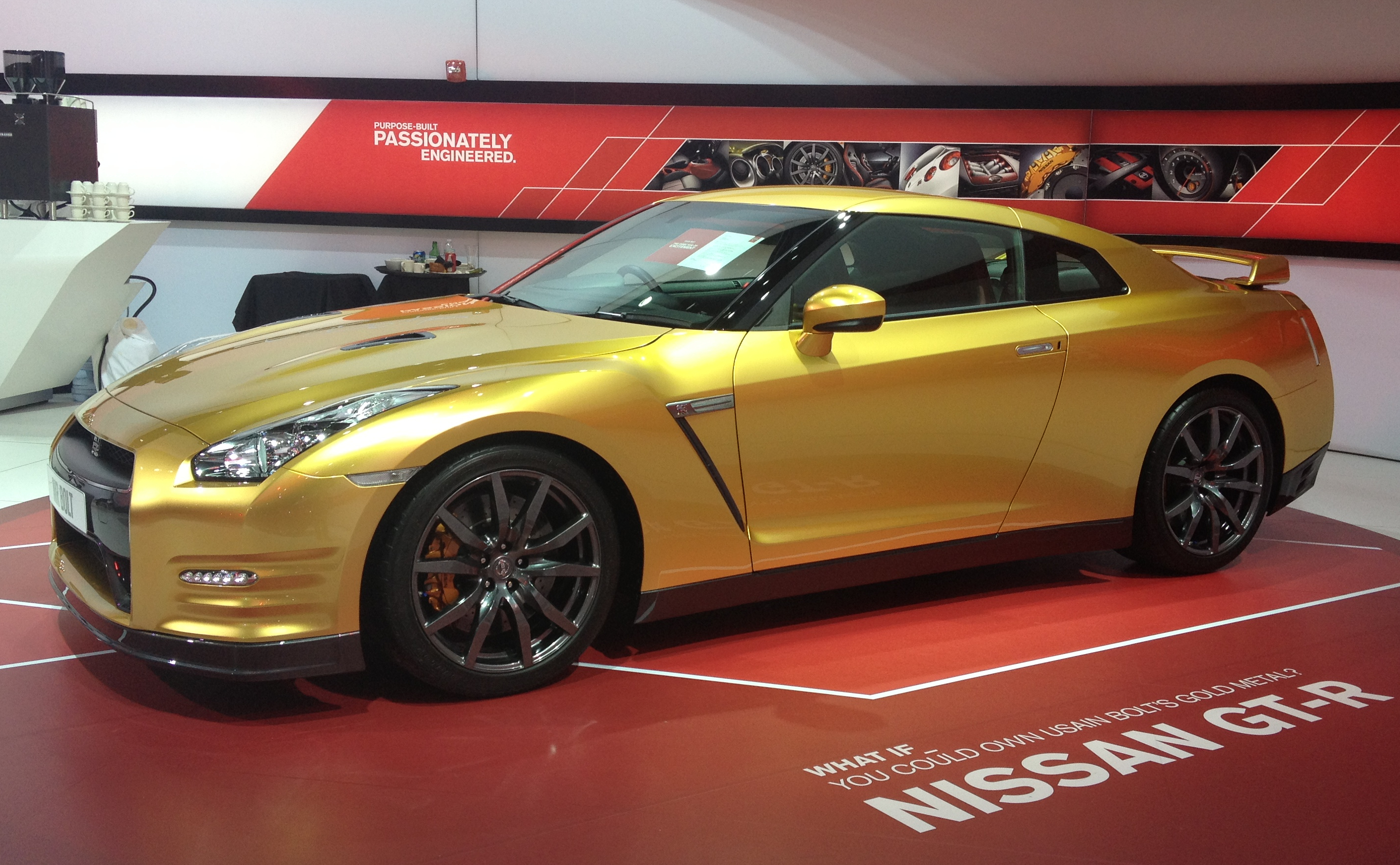
GT-R Bolt Edition displayed at the 2013 North American International Auto Show

Various one-off editions were built throughout the years. In 2012, "Usain Bolt" one-off GT-R, named after the athlete Usain Bolt, was built and auctioned off to raise funds for charity. A display model was held in Tokyo, Japan. Other one-offs include, the Guinness World Record drift car, the GT-R Predzilla that was exclusively built and donated to the Nashville Predators Foundation, custom-painted in Preds' official colours and graphics. The Tomica 50th Anniversary GT-R, built to celebrate the 50th anniversary of Tomica. Based on the 2017 model year GT-R, it was wrapped up with the iconic red and black "Tomica Skyline Turbo Super Silhouette" livery, symbolising the relationship between Tomica and Nissan. A special version of the GT-R Nismo, wrapped in a gold body colour, built in collaboration with McDonald's in Japan. A toy model was also offered with the “Tomica Happy Set" meal.

==== GT-R/C ====
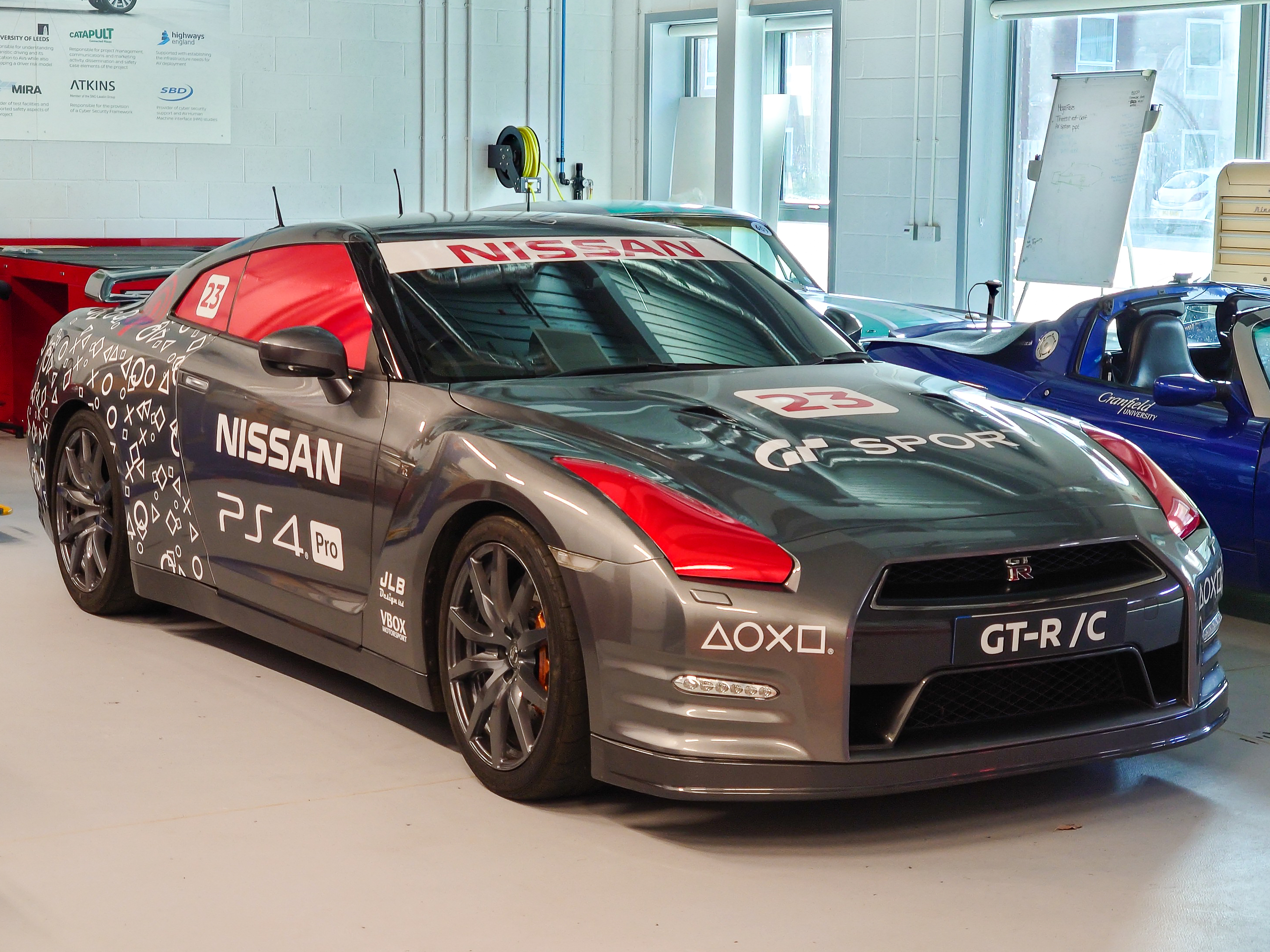
GT-R/C

The GT-R/C was built to celebrate the release of the Gran Turismo Sport video game, and mark 20 years of Nissan's involvement in the Gran Turismo gaming series. It was extensively modified to be driven entirely by a DualShock 4 controller. It was controlled by the Nismo athlete and GT Academy winner, Jann Mardenborough around in a cockpit of a helicopter at the Silverstone Circuit. Mardenborough's fastest lap time was 1:17.47 minutes, averaging 122 km/h and reached a top speed of 211 km/h. The GT-R/C was fitted with four robots to operate the steering, transmission, brakes, and throttle. Six computers mounted in the rear of the car to update the controls up to 100 times per second. The unmodified Dual-Shock 4 connects to a micro-computer that interprets the joystick and button signals and transmits them to its onboard systems. The wireless operation had a primary control range of one kilometre. A Racelogic Vbox Motorsport sensor was installed to relay speed data to an LCD display in the helicopter cockpit. The car was fitted with two independent safety systems operating on different radio frequencies in order to allow two additional operators to apply full ABS braking and cut the engine in the event of the main operator losing control of the vehicle. In 2018, the GT-R/C was used in a tour of primary and secondary schools in the United Kingdom to promote future careers in STEM (Science, Technology, Engineering, and Math) subjects.

=== Police use ===
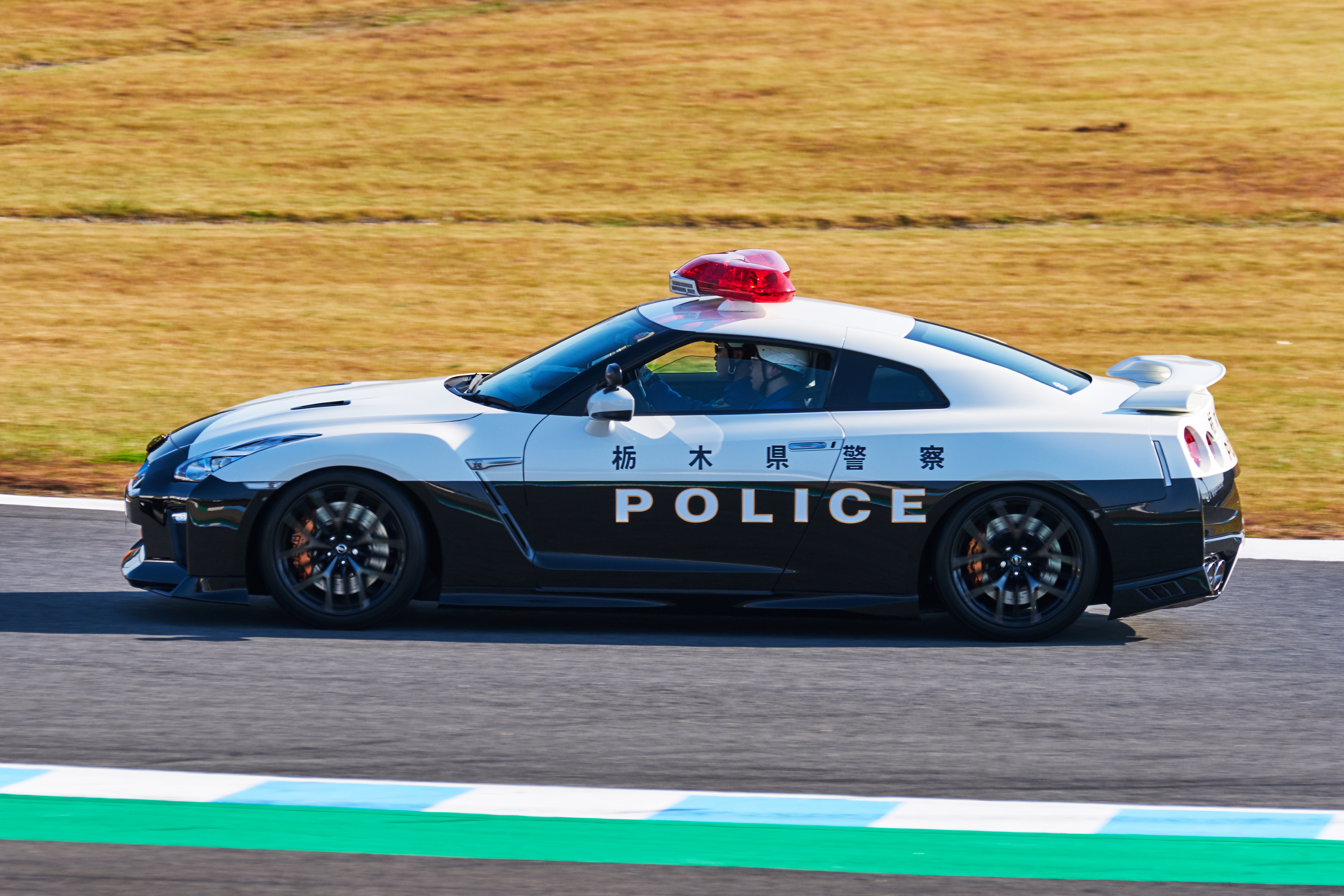
GT-R Tochigi Prefecture Police Department patrol car

The GT-R was used as police patrol vehicles by several police departments worldwide. Including the Tochigi Prefectural Police in Japan, Abu Dhabi Police and Dubai Police Force in the United Arab Emirates.

== Performance ==
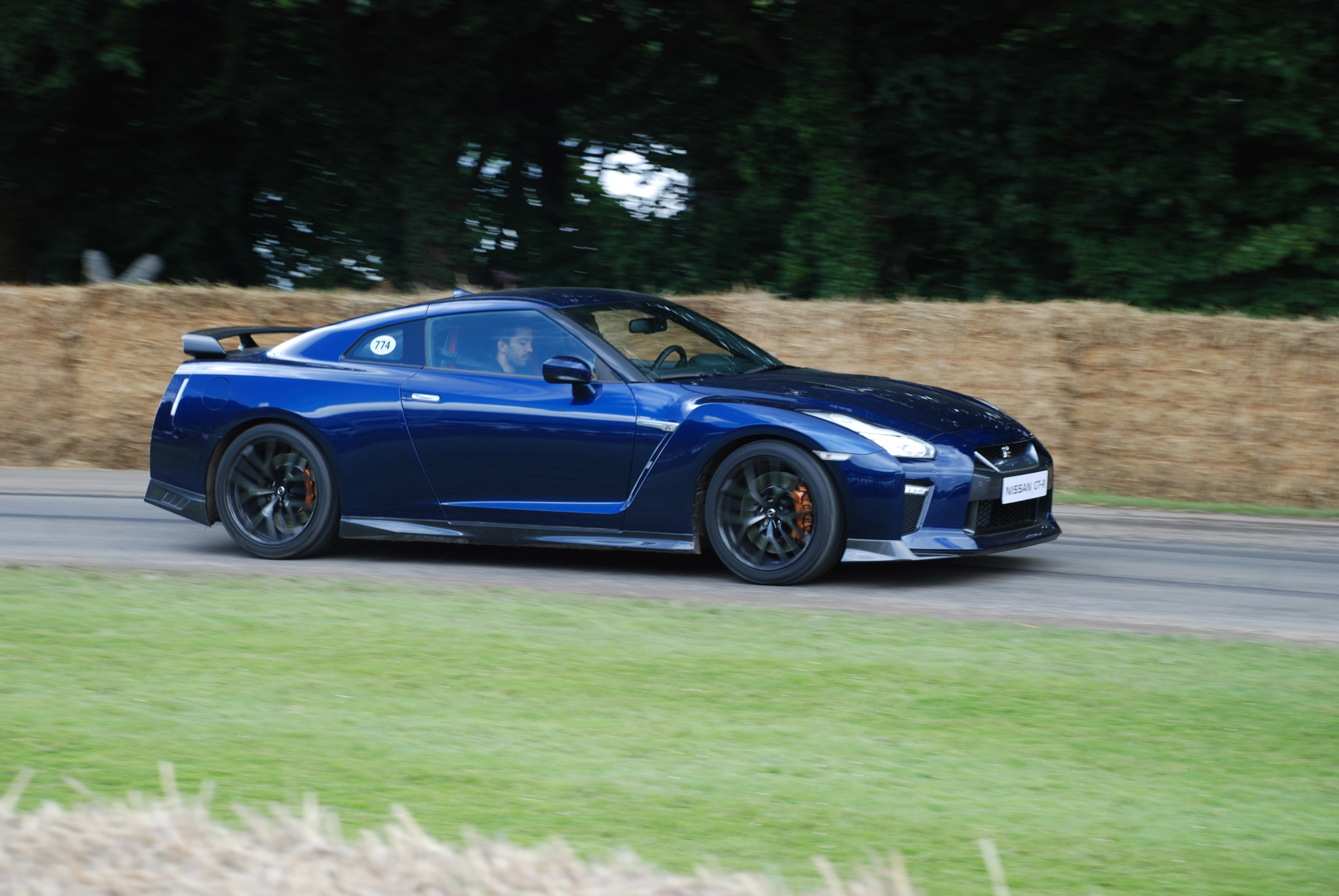
The GT-R at Goodwood Festival of Speed

The GT-R was considered heavy and bulky compared to its competitors, its innovative all-wheel-drive and active suspension systems utilised its weight as an advantage. The unconventional body design maximized downforce and minimized drag, resulting in exceptional acceleration, cornering and handling capabilities. Many automotive publications have used the term, "the GT-R defies the laws of physics" to describe its performance.

Originally, Nissan claimed the GT-R can attain a top speed of 315 km/h (196 mph), but Motor Trend recorded a top speed of 313.8 km/h (195.0 mph) with the original 2009 model year GT-R. Edmunds held the first ever performance test using a customer-spec GT-R in Japan, achieving a 0-97 km/h (60 mph) time of 3.3 seconds and a quarter-mile time of 11.6 seconds. It was the quickest production car they had ever tested. The car was capable of achieving superior performance figures in tests conducted by other automotive magazines. Owners expressed concerns that duplicating the times achieved in these tests would void their factory warranty. Chief Engineer, Kazutoshi Mizuno indicated that he has never used the term "launch control", which refers to the act of turning off Vehicle Dynamic Control (VDC) and launching the car at around 4,500 rpm. However, then-Nissan director of product planning officer, John Wiener stated in an interview with Jay Leno that "we [Nissan] actually offer a 'launch mode'". The GT-R user's manual states that turning off the VDC is only meant for escaping low-traction situations such as mud or snow. However the manufacturer themselves used to turn off the VDC during official hot laps and time attacks. In 2010, Nissan re-programmed the GT-R to reduce engine speed at launch to around 3,500–4,000 rpm with VDC enabled, which was meant to improve acceleration times. The revised programming was also installed in unsold 2009 model year models that were still in their inventory, was also available for existing 2009 vehicles.

The re-programmed GT-R had a launch mode called "R-Mode Start". Enabled by pushing the three buttons up, transmission, suspension and VDC. The system allowed a maximum of 4 consecutive hard launches before locking itself out, after which can be unlocked by driving normally for 2.4 km (1.5 miles). Combined with the "R-Mode Start", the GT-R retained its original performance, which set the Guinness World Record for the fastest accelerating four-seater production vehicle. Nissan offered numerous upgrades for later model years, which saw significant improvements in acceleration figures, top speed, and Nürburgring lap times.

=== Performance table ===
Model Type (Calendar years)	GT-R CBA–R35 (2007–2010)	GT-R DBA–R35 (2010–2012)	GT-R DBA–R35 (2012–2016)	GT-R 4BA–R35 (2016–2025)
0-97 km/h (60 mph)	3.2 sec	2.9 sec	2.8 sec	
0-161 km/h (100 mph)	7.8 sec	7.1 sec	7.0 sec	6.9 sec
0-200 km/h (124 mph)	11.5 sec	11.0 sec	10.6 sec	10.5 sec
400 m (1/4 mi)	11.5 sec at 200 km/h (124 mph)	11.2 sec at 202.7 km/h (126 mph)	11.1 sec at 198.4 km/h (123.3 mph)	10.9 sec (Note: 1 foot rollout not used during this test. A trap speed of 202.7 km/h (126 mph) achieved in another test)
1,000 m (0.62 mi)	21.9 sec at 246 km/h (152.8 mph)	21.2 sec at 254 km/h (158 mph)	20.4 sec at 261 km/h (162.2 mph)	20.2 sec at 263 km/h (163.4 mph)
Lateral acceleration (avg)	1.03g	1.05g	1.03g	0.98g
Braking (97–0 km/h (60–0 mph))	30 m (99 ft)	31 m (101 ft)	32 m (105 ft)	31 m (103 ft)
Nürburgring Nordschleife lap time	7:26.7 minutes	7:24.2 minutes	7:18.6 minutes	–
Top speed	318 km/h (197 mph)	320 km/h (199 mph)		328 km/h (204 mph)

In 2013, in a joint project between Nissan Russia and LAV Productions, the 2012 model year GT-R set an unofficial national ice speed record for a production car at the Lake Baikal, in southern Siberia, Russia. The record was set by Russian racing driver Roman Rusinov, with a trap speed of 294.8 km/h (183 mph). This lake is considered as the deepest lake of the world. According to Nissan, the record car was in standard specifications with factory standard Bridgestone tyres.

=== Official Nürburgring Nordschleife lap times ===
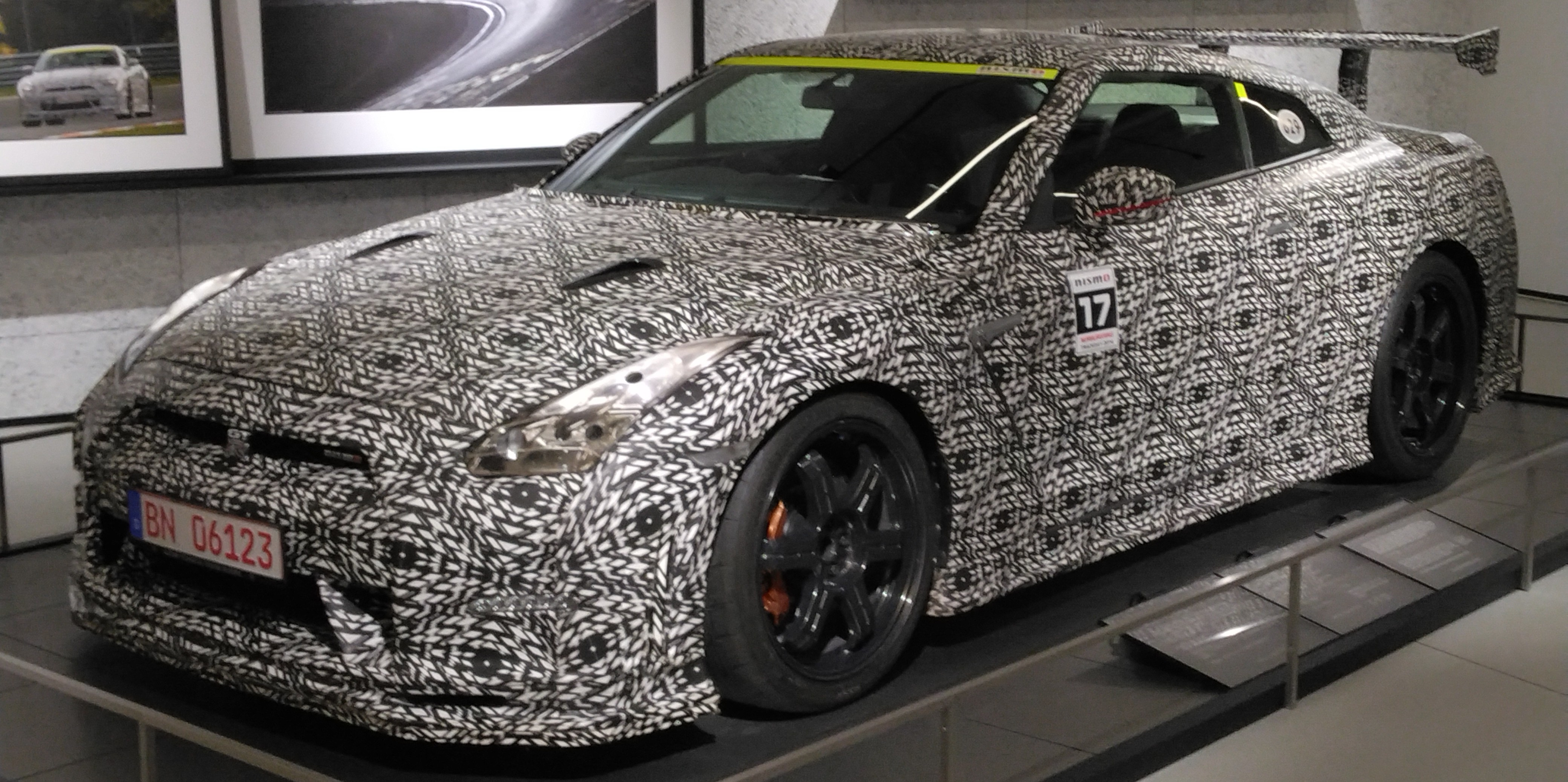
The GT-R Nismo prototype, set the fastest lap time for mass-produced cars at the Nürburgring Nordschleife in 2013

Nissan has published numerous lap times for the GT-R around the Nürburgring Nordschleife. Due to its demanding nature, the "iconic" racetrack played a pivotal role in the development and served as a performance benchmark for the GT-R. Over the years, Nissan conducted numerous time attacks for the car around the Nordschleife, pitting it against Porsche and Chevrolet in pursuit of setting the fastest lap time for mass-produced cars, which garnered attention from the automotive media. Both manufacturers, fielded their respective sports cars, the 911 and Corvette, and consistently engaged in lap time battles against Nissan with the GT-R. The lap times were often navigated by former Formula One driver and development driver, Toshio Suzuki, using factory-standard Dunlop SP Sport Maxx GT 600 DSST CTT run-flat tyres.

Having set a lap time of 7:38.54 minutes in damp conditions before the official launch, Nissan returned to the Nordschleife with the GT-R in April 2008 and set a lap time of 7:32 minutes. Observed by Best Motoring, the GT-R improved its lap time to 7:29.03 minutes in May 2009. Porsche accused Nissan of overstating the performance of the car, claimed they conducted a test of a customer-spec GT-R and recorded a slower lap time of 7:54 minutes, apparently implying that the car was not as fast around the track as it was claimed. Nissan added the car was in standard specifications, equipped with factory standard tyres and implied that Porsche's driver was not as talented as theirs. In the following year, the GT-R with performance upgrades to the 2010 model year, improved its lap time to 7:26.70 minutes.

In September 2010, Nissan returned to the Nordschleife with the facelifted GT-R, and set a lap time of 7:24.22 minutes in its first attempt in damp conditions. Due to poor track conditions, the car could not further improve its lap time and settled down with the latter lap time. According to Nissan, the GT-R improved its Nordschleife lap time again in October 2012 to 7:19.1 minutes, by due to the 2013 model year improvements. Nissan claimed that it lost half a second due to traffic, making a potential lap time of 7:18.6 minutes possible, which would equal the limited-production 911 GT2 RS.

At the end of September 2013, testing was finalized for the GT-R Nismo and the development team was aiming to set a lap time under 7:10 minutes. In his second attempt, Nismo racing driver Michael Krumm recorded a lap time of 7:08.679 minutes and achieved a peak speed of 310 km/h (193 mph) on the Dottinger Hohe uphill straight. Nissan claimed it was the lap record for mass-produced cars around the track, and confirmed the record car used was equipped with post-production track options, available to customers through the N-Attack Package. The optional track-only bonnet gurney strip was also featured in the record-setting car.

=== Independent Nürburgring Nordschleife lap times ===
The car has set independent Nordschleife lap times in tests conducted by automotive publications, navigated by journalist drivers. In a test conducted by Drivers Republic, the GT-R and 911 GT2 set lap times of 7:56 minutes and 7:49 minutes respectively in partially damp conditions. The publication claimed the GT2 could achieve the factory lap time of 7:32 minutes, but not the GT-R going faster than 7:41 minutes in spite of the 7:29 minutes of factory claim, however the test car was equipped with the less stickier, Bridgestone summer tyres and stability control.

The German magazine Sport Auto recorded a lap time of 7:50 minutes in a GT-R supplied by Nissan during an initial short test in 2007, in partially damp conditions. In 2009, in a full "Supertest", Sport Auto recorded a lap time of 7:38 minutes, driven by Horst von Saurma. It was also identical to a lap time of Corvette ZR1, recorded later by the same publication. In a test with the 2011 model year GT-R, they recorded a lap time of 7:34 minutes, again driven by Saurma it was only 10 seconds slower than the official claim.

== Reception ==
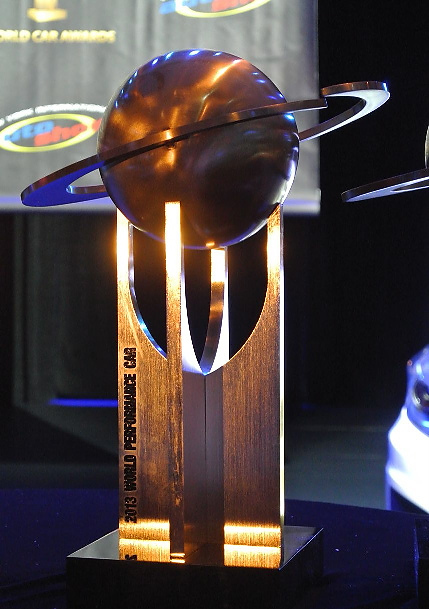
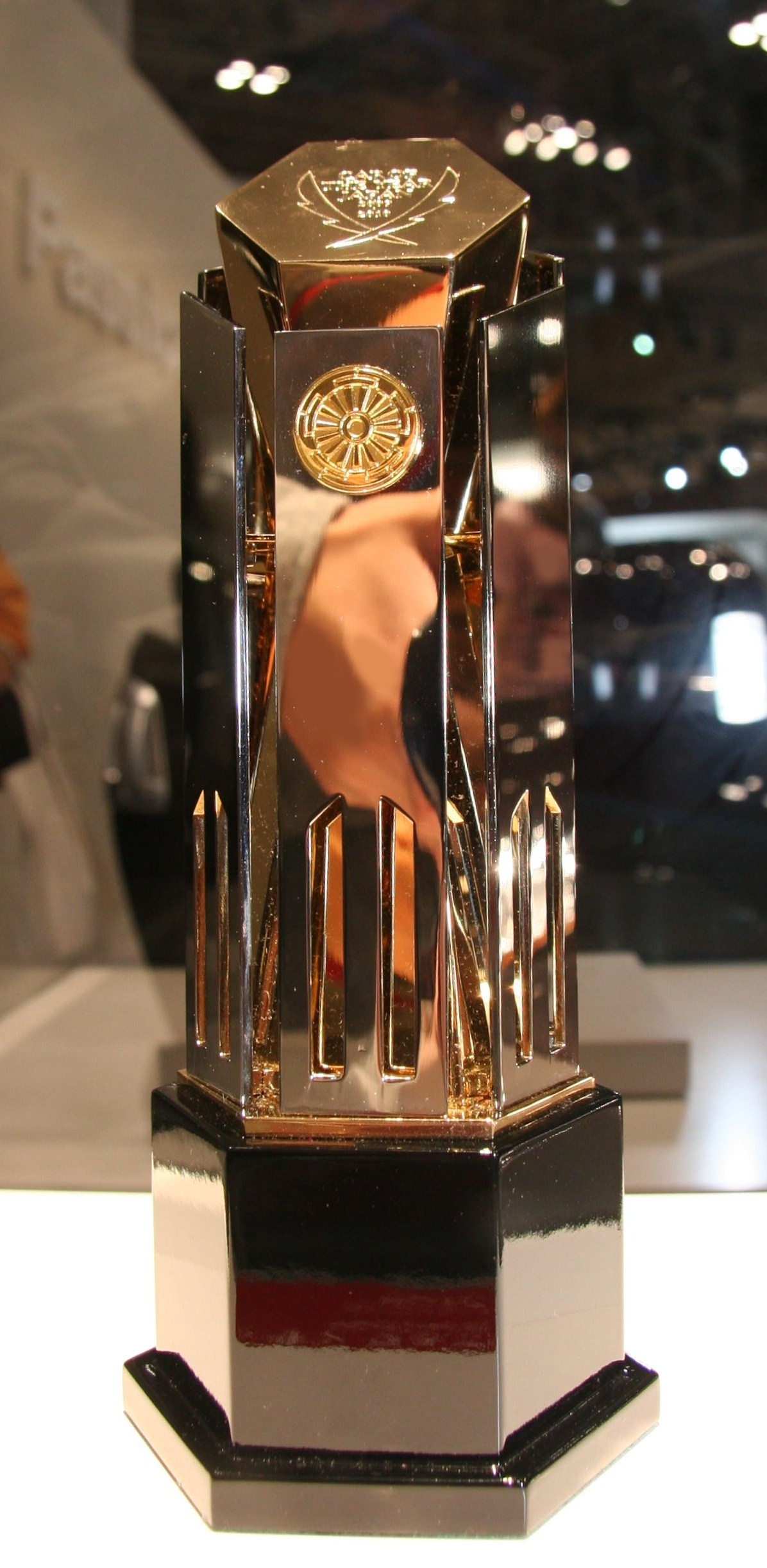
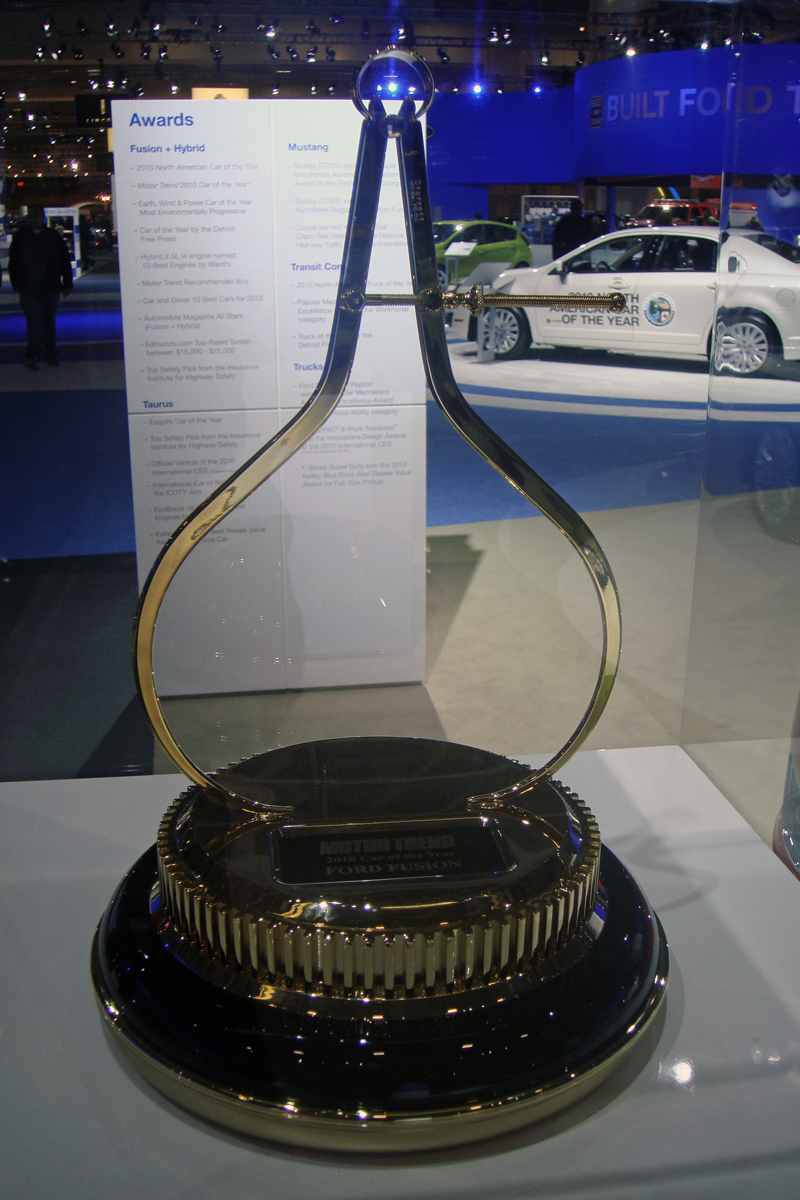
World Performance Car of The Year, Car of The Year Japan and Motor Trend Car of the Year awards (from left), few of the notable accolades won by the GT-R

The GT-R has generally received positive reviews from automotive publications and enthusiasts, particularly for its performance and practicality. It received criticism for its assisted driving experience, choice of interior materials in earlier models, and absence of a manual transmission.

=== Magazines ===
Motor Trend often referred to it as "Godzilla" in their reviews, tests and drag races. In the first acceleration test in 2009, they praised its launch control system, stating "BAM! The GT-R leaves the line like an arrow from a cross-bow. The rear tyres spin for a little over a foot, the fronts never visibly slip. The acceleration screen on the centre dash confirms the test equipment's assertion that longitudinal acceleration of at least 1.0 g persists for almost two seconds. No wonder the forged-aluminium rims have little knurled ridges to keep the tyre beads from slipping." Further added, "[the GT-R] appears to dodge the laws of physics", but was criticized for not being offered with a manual transmission and interior quality, nevertheless it was named as the 2009 Motor Trend Automobile of the Year.

Car and Driver gave the GT-R a positive verdict, claimed "Prejudged on its specs, the GT-R is winning on appeal", praised its acceleration and handling performance, as well as its practicality. Edmunds claimed, "the Nissan GT-R delivers true supercar performance in a user-friendly package for less coin than a base Porsche 911", further added "it can get you to 60 mph faster than any Ferrari or Lamborghini currently in production". Top Gear magazine claimed, "This car is the greatest performance bargain of this or any other century, and is one of the most incredible cars of any kind ever built. For the price of a BMW M3, you have a four-wheel-drive, super-high-tech, all-weather, 195mph supercar with tremendous ability on all roads and an almost impossibly cool image. And a boot".

In the first performance test held by Road & Track, they praised the smoothness of its engine's power delivery as well as the lack of turbo lag. They added its brakes could be used to induce oversteer, noting that "steering effort is light, and the all-wheel-drive system takes much of the drama out of exiting corners". Regarding the practicality of the car, the magazine states, "There is plenty of room for a big guy and a back seat that can be used by shorter folks. The ride is on the harsh side, even with the suspension setting switched to full comfort. The various screens of the monitor are neat, though some of the materials here could be better." The magazine on conclusion states, "[the GT-R] might well be considered the most exotic car on the planet".

Autocar magazine's, Chris Harris criticized the car for its ride quality, he added "with the three-way dampers set to hard, it is undriveable", but praised its performance and drivetrain, "There is only one performance car with a better powertrain than the GT-R, and it is made by Bugatti at considerable cost. With the double-clutch gearbox set to automatic you only feel a slight judder from first to second and thereafter it is, for want of a less sickly phrase, seamless". Also "there is real sophistication to the way it handles. And unlike its predecessor, the R35 does not just spit you in to oversteer. It simply catapults you away from slow turns". The motor journalist gave a conclusion, stating "I want one now! If you cannot wait for a UK car some time next year then you will need to personally import one. But believe me: if you are after the ultimate performance weapon of the moment, there is every reason to. This is the best value performance car on the planet".

=== TV series ===
In series 11 of the British motoring show Top Gear, Jeremy Clarkson described the GT-R's performance, saying its "acceleration is blistering, it is just savage!". He also complimented its cornering performance, saying, "It corners faster than electricity." He concluded, "They have not built a new car here, they built a new yardstick." He was forced to end his test drive prematurely, because of its cornering speed causing him to pull a muscle in his neck at Fuji Speedway. In another episode of Top Gear, James May tested its launch control system. Following his first run using launch control, he stated "that is tremendous, I have never gone off the line that well in a car". Clarkson added "there is no car that accelerates when you look from 30 yards like this one does". In an episode of Fifth Gear, Jason Plato praised its acceleration and cornering performance, stating "it is a great car, it is fantastic fun, it is great value for money, we like it, we like it a lot". Jay Leno, in his television show, also praised its performance and overall practicality as a sports car.

=== Accolades ===
Year	Award	Category	Result	Ref.
2007	Top Gear Awards	Sports Car of The Year	Won	
2008	Autocar Awards	Driver's Car of The Year	Won	
2008	Evo Magazine Awards	Car of The Year	Won	
2008	Auto Express Awards	Sports Car of The Year, Performance Car of The Year	Won	
2008	Car of The Year Japan Awards	Japan's Most Advanced Technology	Won	
2008	Vehicle Dynamics International Awards	Car of The Year	Won	
2008	Japanese Performance Awards	Car of The Year	Won	
2008	Performance Car Awards	Car of The Year	Won	
2008	Car Magazine Awards	Best Car of The Year	Won	
2008	Popular Mechanics Awards	Automotive Excellence Design	Won	
2009	Automobile Magazine Awards	Automobile of The Year	Won	
2009	What Car? Awards	Performance Car of The Year	Won	
2009	MotorWeek Drivers' Choice Awards	Performance Car of The Year	Won	
2009	Motor Magazine Awards	Performance Car of The Year	Won	
2009	Edmunds' Inside Line Editors' Most Wanted Awards	Instant Classic of The Year	Won	
2009	Motor Trend Awards	Car of The Year	Won	
2009	Popular Science Awards	Grand Auto Tech of The Year	Won	
2009	Road & Travel Awards	International Car of The Year	Won	
2009	World Car Awards	World Performance Car of The Year	Won	
2010	Evo Magazine Awards	Car of The Decade	Won	
2011	Motor Magazine Awards	Performance Car of The Year	Won	
2014	Edmunds' Top Rated Vehicle Awards	Most Popular Premium Sports Car of The Year	Won	
2017	Autobytel Awards	Buyer's Choice of The Year	Won	

In addition to these accolades, the GT-R has also set Guinness World Records for the fastest accelerating four-seater production car, ice speed record for a production car, and fastest drift speed record. In 2010, it was named as having one of the best resale values of any sports car by Yahoo!. Top Gear, Auto Express and Car Connection entitled the GT-R as one of the best performance cars in 2015. Car Connection, again claimed the GT-R as one of the best performance cars in 2019. In 2021 and 2022, Autocar and Auto Express named it as one of the best hardcore sports cars. Road & Track mentioned the GT-R as one of the best daily drivers, while Evo Magazine claimed it as one of the best coupes in 2022. Carwow named the GT-R as one of the best sports cars of 2023. Car and Driver listed it as one of the best luxury sports cars of 2024.

== Motorsport ==
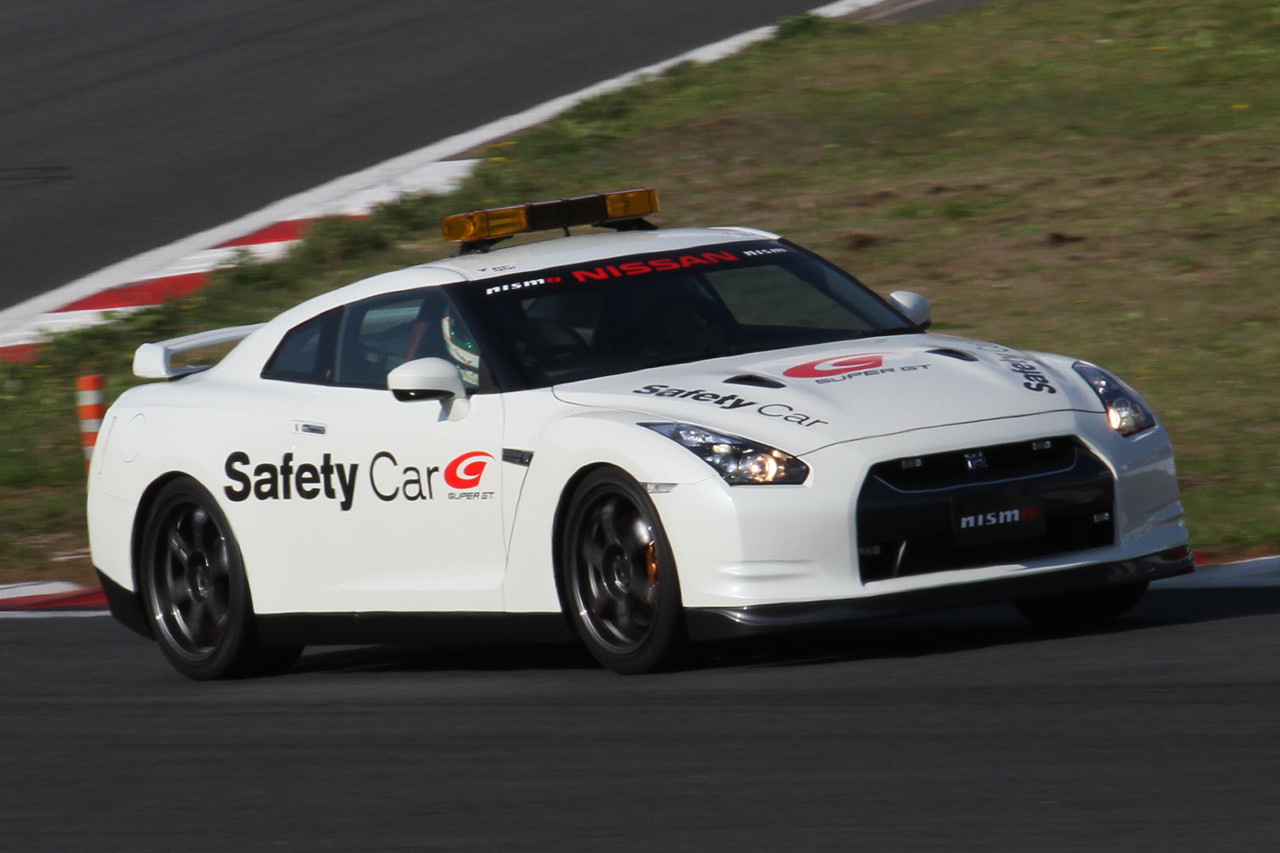
GT-R safety car in the Super GT series

The GT-R competed across a wide range of racing disciplines, attaining multiple successes. Notable motorsport achievements came through from its participation in sports car racing, including championship triumphs in the FIA GT1 World Championship, GT World Challenge and in the Super GT series. As well as in endurance races, with consistent top order finishes in the Bathurst 12 Hour, Nürburgring 24 Hours, Spa 24 Hours among others. The car has been used as the official safety car in numerous motorsport events, such as in the Super GT series, FIA GT1 World Championship, British Superbike Championship, and in the Supercars Championship.

== Legacy ==
Critics agreed the GT-R is among the best Japanese automobiles, with some listing it among the best of the 21st century, and of all time. At the time of its release, featuring advanced technologies such as launch control and a dual-clutch transmission—which were not common among production cars were seen as transformative, and altering the expectations for sports cars. Following its release, these technologies became increasingly widespread, Motor Trend listed the GT-R as it has changed the automotive industry, noting that "it altered the supercar landscape, leaving competitors scratching their heads". Critics noted it has played a critical role in the democratisation of high-performance sports cars, with influence extending to modern manufacturers' priority on Nürburgring lap times. The Drive credited the GT-R as an inspiration for unconventional vehicles, such as sport sedans and SUVs to incorporate advanced technologies, and achieve sports car-like performance figures.

The GT-R has been regarded as a benchmark for sports car performance. Road & Track claimed achieving or surpassing the performance of more expensive sports cars was "unheard of" at the time of its release. The GT-R has a wide and active aftermarket tuning community, with significant influence among automotive enthusiasts. Whilst it was initially criticised for assisted driving experiences at the time of release, it was later praised for "analogue" feel amid the increasing number of sports cars featuring digital driving experiences. Including its later years, critics found the GT-R had remained comparable to newer competition in terms of performance, due to consistent updates over its 18-year production span.
