= Porsche LMP2000 =

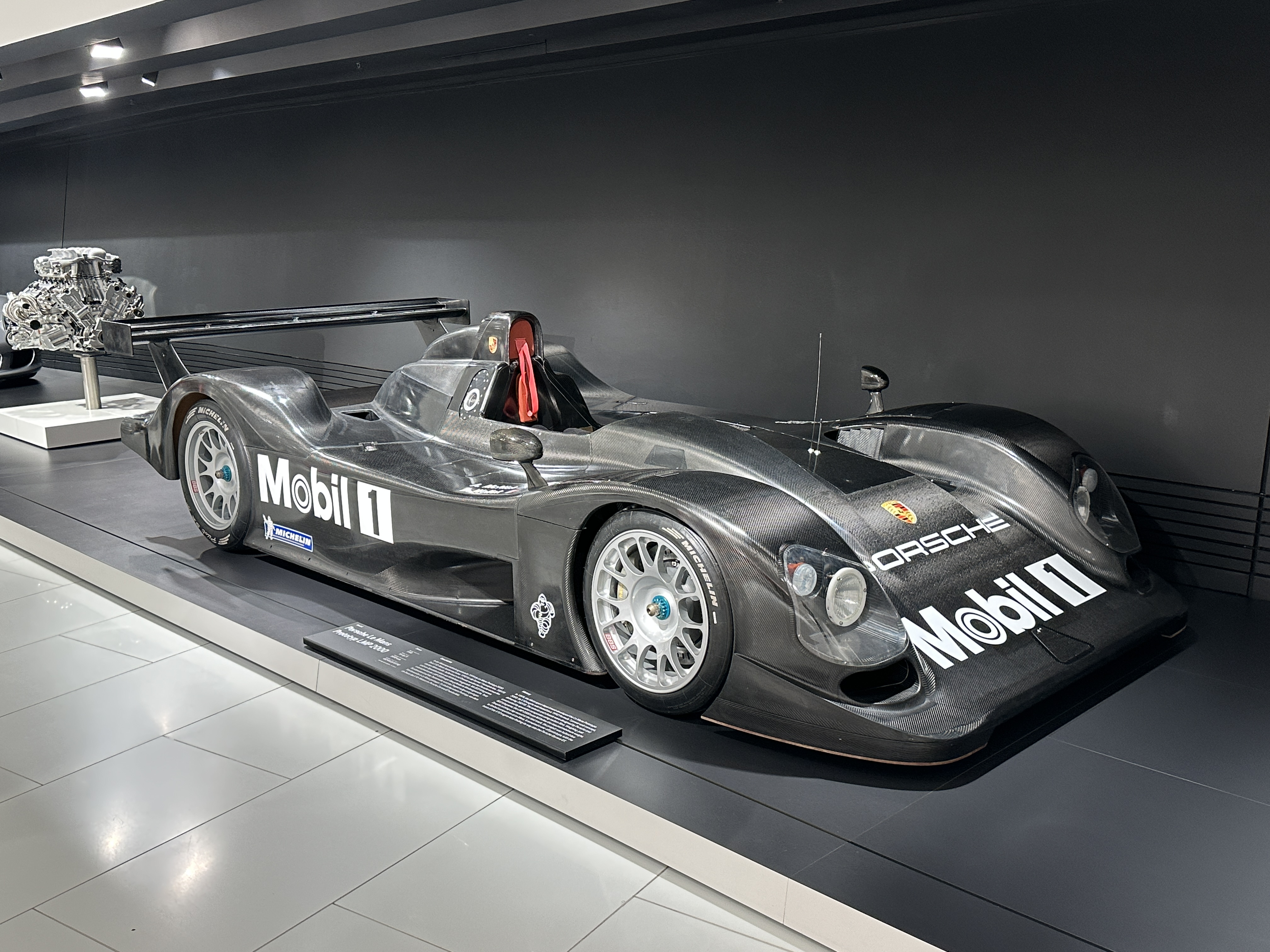
- Porsche LMP2000 at the Porsche Museum in Stuttgart
- Category: LMP
- Constructor: Porsche; Lola Composites
- Designers: Norbert Singer; Wiet Huidekoper
- Predecessor: Porsche LMP1-98
- Successor: Porsche RS Spyder

Technical specifications
- Chassis: Carbon fibre
- Engine: Porsche 5,000–5,500 cc (305.1–335.6 cu in) 40-valve, DOHC V10, naturally-aspirated mid-engined
- Transmission: 6-speed sequential manual gearbox
- Power: 700 hp (522.0 kW) @ 10,000 rpm
- Weight: 900–930 kg (1,984.2–2,050.3 lb)

Competition history
- Notable drivers: Bob Wollek; Allan McNish
- Debut: N/A
Races	Wins	Poles	F/Laps
0	0	0	0

The Porsche LMP2000 (codename Porsche 9R3) is a Le Mans Prototype racing car that was developed between 1998 and 2000, but never raced. One car was built, and it was designed around a modified version of Porsche's 3.5-litre V10 engine that was originally designed for Formula 1 in 1992. The project was canceled before the car was publicly unveiled, leading to various rumors about the reason for its demise.

== Design and development ==
In 1998 Porsche designed a Le Mans Prototype for the following season, assigning it the codename 9R3. Porsche noted that "new regulations for Le Mans will give open sports cars a greater potential than a GT for an overall win" at Le Mans. The chassis was designed by Norbert Singer. It was initially to use a modified version of the turbocharged flat-six engine found in the Porsche 911 road car, but that engine was considered to be overweight and underpowered, as well as requiring extra cooling.

In November 1998, Porsche opted against building the car for 1999, announcing that they would return to Le Mans in 2000. Porsche instead redeveloped the 3.5-litre V10 engine that was originally developed in 1992 for Formula One team Footwork Arrows. The 3.5-litre V10 engine was redesigned to be 5.5-litres in capacity, and the pneumatic valve springs were removed, as the air restrictors mandated under LMP regulations made them redundant. The chassis was unaltered apart from suspension geometry for newer tires and the engine mountings to accommodate the new engine.

=== Cancellation ===
In May 1999 the project was halted by the Porsche board, but the chassis was allowed to be completed. A two-day private test at Weissach took place in November 1999, with the car driven by Allan McNish and Bob Wollek, who reportedly gave positive feedback. The car was then placed in storage. Despite photographs of the car at the test being leaked to the media, Porsche denied knowledge of the existence of the car.

Rumours subsequently circulated about the cancellation of the project. These included an agreement between Porsche CEO Wendelin Wiedeking and Volkswagen Group chairman Ferdinand Piëch to co-operate on a new SUV project (which became the Porsche Cayenne and Volkswagen Touareg). The agreement allegedly included Porsche withdrawing from Le Mans competition, avoiding a competition with its Audi R8 stablemate that later won the 2000 24 Hours of Le Mans. Others noted insufficient competition after the withdrawal of BMW, Toyota, Nissan and Mercedes-Benz.

Some have noted that the cancellation of the LMP 2000 was positive for Porsche in the long run, given the profit margins and market share from building SUVs. Porsche sales have risen from around 50,000 a year in 2002, to over 300,000 in 2022 – with nearly 190,000 being SUVs.

Following the shutdown of the project, engineers were subsequently diverted to the Porsche Cayenne SUV project. The Porsche V10 engine from the car was used in the Porsche Carrera GT concept car and was retuned for the production version.

In July 2018, the car was exhibited in public for the first time at the Goodwood Festival of Speed, as part of the 70th anniversary celebrations of Porsche. In 2024, Porsche Museum restored the car to working order to celebrate 25 years. A rollout for the car took place in October 2024, once again driven by Allan McNish.
