= Sport auto (Germany) =

German automobile magazine

- Editor-in-Chief: Marcus Schurig (since 1 March 2013)
- Categories: Newsmagazine
- Frequency: Monthly
- Circulation: 59,800
- Publisher: Motor Presse Stuttgart GmbH & Co. KG
- Founded: 1969
- Country: Germany
- Based in: Stuttgart
- Language: German
- Website: sportauto-online.de
- ISSN: 1158-2111

sport auto is a German automobile magazine, established in 1969, published monthly by Motor Presse Stuttgart, based in Stuttgart.

The magazine publishes its "Supertest" of cars, featuring the laptime at the Nordschleife. Until 2015 almost all supertest were done by Horst von Saurma, from 2015 laptimes are recorded by Christian Gebhardt. The magazine also runs a challenge for the fastest lap time driven with a car that is road legal (TÜV) and registered in Germany. The road legality rule also applies for the tires.

== Racing participation ==
The journalists usually enter VLN and 24 Hours Nürburgring races, in cooperation with Honda or Aston Martin. Results are mixed, they caused at least two crashes.

== Sport Auto Trophy ==
In 1995, the magazine introduced a Nordschleife lap record challenge for the fastest lap time driven with a car that is road legal, having passed German TÜV and is registered in Germany. The road legality rule also applies for the tires. After the trophy had been given to Blitz, a Japanese tuning parts company in 1997, sport auto editor Horst v. Saurma regained the record in 1999. After the sport auto record was lowered to 7:14 in 2005, sport auto announced to introduce rules according to their Hockenheimring-based Tuner GP event. In 2005, sport auto also clocked a 6:55 for a UK-registered Radical SR8 which is not eligible to sport auto's ranking.

Time	Vehicle	Driver	Issue, (Date of Test), Notes
6:57	Porsche 918	Marc Lieb	2013-09-04, Michelin Pilot Sport Cup 2, Weissach Package
7:11,57	Gumpert Apollo Speed	Florian Gruber	2009-08-13, Michelin Pilot Sport Cup 2
7:14,89	Donkervoort D8 RS	Michael Düchting	2005-10
7:15,63	Porsche 996 GT2R Edo Competition	Patrick Simon	2005-08-04
7:18,10	Donkervoort D8 RS	Michael Düchting	2004-08-25
7:32,44	Porsche Carrera GT	Horst von Saurma	2004-04 (8 September)
7:32,52	Porsche 993 Turbo Gemballa GTR 600	Wolfgang Kaufmann	2001
7:43,40	Porsche Turbo TECHART GT Street	Horst von Saurma	2001
7:46,17	Porsche Turbo shk	Horst von Saurma	1999
7:49,40	Toyota Supra Blitz	Herbert Schürg	1997
7:52	Porsche Turbo Gemballa	Horst von Saurma	1995

=== 5 Supersportler auf der Nordschleife ===
In 2008, five super sports cars owned by an enthusiast were compared by Porsche factory driver Marc Basseng, winner of several VLN races in Porsche GT3 RSR. Timing was provided by sport auto as in a Supertest. The results were also reported elsewhere.

Time	Vehicle	Driver	Issue, (Date of Test), Notes
7:24.29	Maserati MC12	Marc Basseng	2008/12, (2008/08)
7:24.44	Pagani Zonda F Clubsport	Marc Basseng	see above
7:25.21	Ferrari Enzo	Marc Basseng	see above
7.28.71	Porsche Carrera GT	Marc Basseng	see above
7:33.55	Koenigsegg CCX	Marc Basseng	see above

== Supertest Nordschleife ==
During the industry testing sessions in which sport auto records its "Supertest", the track can not be traveled at full speed past "Tribüne 13" (T13, grandstand 13) in order to allow safe access from the old exit/entrance there. The missing 232 m (761 ft) uphill section, from a slow right hand corner, would take in average an extra 7 s compared to a full lap.

There are 5 sections on the 20,600 m (67,600 ft) long Supertest-Nordschleife:

- The first is 3,850 m (2.4 mi)
- The second is 4,235 m (2.6 mi)
- The third is 4,825 m (3.0 mi)
- The fourth is 4,846 m (3.0 mi)
- The fifth is 2,844 m (1.8 mi)
- The total is 20,600 m (12.800 mi)

In recent tests, about 33 numbers are reported to judge a cars performance on various points of a Ring lap: speeds, braking deceleration and lateral g-forces. Sortable list of some Supertest times are provided online.

Supertest results
Make	Model	Test Date/Issue	Nordschleife time	Hockenheim time	0–100 km/h	0–200 km/h	Driver	Production Years	Power	Ptwr kg/PS	Tyres
Porsche	911 GT2 RS	2018-07	6.58 Min	1.03,8 Min	2.9	8.5	Christian Gebhardt	2017–06 to 2019	700	2.2	Michelin Pilot Sport Cup 2 N2
Porsche	918 Spyder	2014-06-28	7.13 Min	1.06,3 Min	2.6	7.4	Horst von Saurma	2014–04 to 2015-01	887	1.9	Michelin Pilot Sport Cup 2 [N0]
Ferrari	488 GTB Coupé	2016-12	7.22 Min	1.07,0 Min	3.0	8.6	Christian Gebhardt	2015-07	670	2.2	Michelin Pilot Sport Cup 2
Porsche	911 GT2 RS	2010-11	7.24 Min	1.08,4 Min	3.5	9.8	Horst von Saurma	2010–10 to 2012-06	544	2.6	Michelin Pilot Sport Cup
Gumpert	Apollo Sport	2009-11	7.24 Min	1.07,2 Min	3.9	9.5	Horst von Saurma	2007–12 to 2013-08	700	2.0	Michelin Pilot Sport Cup
Lamborghini	Aventador LP 700-4	2012-08	7.25 Min	1.08,6 Min	3.0	9.5	Horst von Saurma	2011-09	700	2.2	Pirelli P Zero Corsa
McLaren	MP4-12C	2011-11	7.28 Min	1.08,7 Min	3.4	9.8	Horst von Saurma	2011–10 to 2014-02	625	2.2	Pirelli P Zero Corsa
Lamborghini	Huracán LP 610-4 Coupé	2016-08	7.28 Min	1.07,5 Min	2.9	9.3	Christian Gebhardt	2014-01	610	2.3	Pirelli P Zero Trofeo R
Porsche	911 GT3 RS	2015-08	7.28 Min	1.08,5 Min	3.5	11.6	Christian Gebhardt	2015-05	500	2.9	Michelin Pilot Sport Cup 2
Porsche	911 GT3 RS 4.0	2011-08	7.30 Min	1.09,5 Min	3.9	12.0	Horst von Saurma	2011–05 to 2012-08	500	2.7	Michelin Pilot Sport Cup [N1]
Porsche	911 GT3	2013-11	7.32 Min	1.09,6 Min	3.5	11.8	Horst von Saurma	2013-05	475	3.1	Michelin Pilot Sport Cup 2
Porsche	Carrera GT	2004-01	7.32 Min	1.08,6 Min	3.7	10.1	Horst von Saurma	2003–04 to 2006-04	612	2.3	Michelin Pilot Sport
Audi	R8 5.2 FSI Quattro Plus	2015-10-30	7.32 Min	1.09,4 Min	3.2	10.1	Christian Gebhardt	2015-05	610	2.7	Michelin Pilot Sport Cup 2
Porsche	911 GT3 RS	2010-05	7.33 Min	1.09,6 Min	4.0	12.6	Horst von Saurma	2009–09 to 2011-04	450	3.2	Michelin Pilot Sport Cup [N1]
Pagani	Zonda F	2006-05	7.33 Min	1.10,8 Min	3.7	11.3	Horst von Saurma	2006–05 to 2007-05	602	2.2	Michelin Pilot Sport 2
Ferrari	F 12 Berlinetta	2014-09-27	7.33 Min	1.09,9 Min	3.2	9.1	Horst von Saurma	2012–08 to 2015-10	741	2.1	Michelin Pilot Sport Cup 2
Porsche	911 GT2	2007-11	7.33 Min	1.10,0 Min	3.5	11.5	Horst von Saurma	2007–11 to 2009-05	530	2.8	Michelin Pilot Sport Cup [Porsche]
Lexus	LFA	2012-02	7.34 Min	1.09,5 Min	3.9	11.1	Horst von Saurma	2010–10 to 2013-03	571	2.7	Bridgestone Potenza RE070
Audi	R8 GT	2010-12	7.34 Min	1.09,6 Min	3.9	12.0	Horst von Saurma	2009–04 to 2012-08	560	2.8	Pirelli P Zero Corsa R02
Porsche	911 Turbo S	2014-02-25	7.34 Min	1.08,7 Min	3.0	10.0	Horst von Saurma	2013–09 to 2016-02	560	3.0	Dunlop Sport Maxx Race
Porsche	911 Carrera S	2016-06-13	7.34 Min	1.09,6 Min	3.7	12.8	Christian Gebhardt	2015-11	420	3.6	Pirelli P Zero [N1]
Koenigsegg	CCX-R	2006-03	7.34 Min	1.09,8 Min	3.9	9.6	Horst von Saurma	2006–03 to 2007-03	806	1.7	Michelin Pilot Sport 2
Mercedes	SLS AMG Black Series	2013-12	7.35 Min	1.08,6 Min	3.7	11.3	Horst von Saurma	2013–06 to 2014-01	631	2.5	Michelin Pilot Sport Cup 2
Ruf	Rt12	2008-02	7.35 Min	1.10,2 Min	3.5	9.8	Horst von Saurma	2008–08 to 2015-05	650	2.4	Michelin Pilot Sport Cup
McLaren	650 S	2015-03	7.35 Min	1.08,7 Min	3.0	9.0	Horst von Saurma	2014–02 to 2016-02	650	2.1	Pirelli P Zero Corsa
Nissan	GT-R	2011-05	7.36 Min	1.10,0 Min	3.2	11.5	Horst von Saurma	2010–04 to 2011-05	530	3.4	Dunlop SP Sport Maxx GT 600 DSST
Mercedes	AMG GT S	2016-11	7.36 Min	1.09,6 Min	3.5	11.3	Christian Gebhardt	2015–01 to 2017-03	510	3.2	Michelin Pilot Sport Cup 2 *
Honda	NSX	2017-02	7.36 Min	1.10,0 Min	3.5	11.5	Christian Gebhardt	2016-09	507	3.5	Pirelli P Zero Trofeo R *
BMW	M4 GTS Coupé	2016-09	7.37 Min	1.09,6 Min	3.9	12.3	Christian Gebhardt	2016-01	500	3.1	Michelin Pilot Sport Cup 2
Lamborghini	Gallardo LP 570-4 Superleggera	2011-04	7.38 Min	1.09,2 Min	3.5	10.6	Horst von Saurma	2010–05 to 2013-11	570	2.3	Pirelli P Zero Corsa
Chevrolet	Corvette ZR1	2009-10	7.38 Min	1.09,7 Min	4.0	11.3	Horst von Saurma	2009–06 to 2013-01	647	2.3	Michelin Pilot Sport ZP
Lexus	LFA	2010-09	7.38 Min	1.11,0 Min	4.3	12.5	Horst von Saurma	2010–10 to 2013-03	560	2.6	Bridgestone Potenza S001
Ferrari	458 Italia	2010-08	7.38 Min	1.10,5 Min	3.5	10.6	Horst von Saurma	2009–12 to 2015-05	570	2.6	Michelin Pilot Sport [N1]
Nissan	GT-R	2009-07	7.38 Min	1.20,0 Min	4.1	13.3	Horst von Saurma	2009–01 to 2009-10	486	3.7	Dunlop SP Sport 600
TechArt	GTstreet	2007-10	7.39 Min	1.09,9 Min	3.7	10.8	Horst von Saurma	2006–05 to 2015-05	630	2.4	Michelin Pilot Sport Cup
Ferrari	430 Scuderia	2008-07	7.39 Min	1.10,3 Min	3.5	11.1	Horst von Saurma	2008–03 to 2010-12	510	2.8	Pirelli P Zero Corsa
Mercedes	SLS AMG	2010-05	7.40 Min	1.10,8 Min	4.0	11.5	Horst von Saurma	2009–10 to 2014-01	571	2.9	Continental Sport Contact 5
Porsche	911 GT3	2009-06	7.40 Min	1.10,4 Min	4.0	13.1	Horst von Saurma	2009–05 to 2011-04	435	3.3	Michelin Pilot Sport Cup
Lamborghini	Murciélago LP 670-4 SuperVeloce	2010-01	7.42 Min	1.09,5 Min	3.2	10.3	Horst von Saurma	2009–05 to 2010-03	670	2.4	Pirelli P Zero Corsa
Porsche	Cayman GT4	2015-05	7.42 Min	1.10,1 Min	4.5	14.5	Christian Gebhardt	2015–02 to 2016-05	385	3.6	Michelin Pilot Sport Cup 2
Porsche	911 Turbo S	2011-03	7.44 Min	1.10,9 Min	3.0	10.6	Horst von Saurma	2010–04 to 2012-08	530	3.1	Bridgestone Potenza RE050A
Porsche	911 Carrera S	2011-12	7.44 Min	1.10,4 Min	4.1	14.1	Horst von Saurma	2011–11 to 2015-05	400	3.7	Pirelli P Zero
Audi	R8 5.2 FSI Quattro	2009-09	7.44 Min	1.10,9 Min	4.0	13.0	Horst von Saurma	2009–04 to 2012-08	525	3.2	Pirelli P Zero Corsa [R01]
Pagani	Zonda S	2002-07-01	7.44 Min	1.11,6 Min	3.8	11.2	Horst von Saurma	2006–05 to 2007-05	555	2.5	Michelin Pilot Sport
Audi	R8 V10 plus	2013-05	7.45 Min	1.10,6 Min	3.7	12.0	Horst von Saurma	2012–05 to 2015-04	550	3.0	Pirelli P Zero Corsa [R02]
Lamborghini	Gallardo Superleggera	2007-09-11	7.46 Min	1.10,9 Min	4.0	13.6	Horst von Saurma	2007–01 to 2008-04	530	2.6	Pirelli P Zero Corsa
Mercedes	C 63 AMG Coupé	2012-01	7.46 Min	1.10,6 Min	3.9	13.8	Horst von Saurma	2011–12 to 2015-09	517	3.3	Dunlop Sport Maxx Race
Porsche	911 GT3 RS	2004-03-22	7.47 Min	1.11,8 Min	4.1	13.5	Horst von Saurma	2003–07 to 2004-07	381	3.7	Pirelli P Zero Corsa
Porsche	718 Cayman S	2016-10	7.47 Min	1.11,3 Min	4.3	15.0	Christian Gebhardt	2016-06	350	4.1	Pirelli P Zero [N1]
Porsche	911 Turbo	2011-03	7.47 Min	1.12,1 Min	3.2	10.8	Horst von Saurma	2009–09 to 2012-08	500	3.3	Michelin Pilot Sport Cup
Wiesmann	GT MF5	2010-07	7.47 Min	1.09,7 Min	3.9	11.6	Horst von Saurma	2009–08 to 2014-12	507	2.8	Michelin Pilot Sport Cup+
Ferrari	599 GTB Fiorano	2007-08	7.47 Min	N/A Min	3.7	11.1	Horst von Saurma	2006–09 to 2012-01	620	2.7	Pirelli P Zero [Ferrari]
Lamborghini	Murciélago LP 640	2007-01-01	7.47 Min	1.11,8 Min	3.7	12.1	Horst von Saurma	2006–07 to 2010-03	640	2.6	Pirelli P Zero Corsa
Porsche	911 GT3	2006-07-27	7.47 Min	1.11,7 Min	4.3	13.8	Horst von Saurma	2006–06 to 2008-06	415	3.5	Michelin Pilot Sport Cup
BMW	M3 GTS Coupé	2010-09	7.48 Min	1.12,5 Min	4.1	14.1	Horst von Saurma	2010–07 to 2011-12	450	3.5	Pirelli P Zero Corsa
Porsche	911 GT3 RS	2007-03-19	7.48 Min	1.11,1 Min	4.3	14.0	Horst von Saurma	2006–10 to 2008-06	415	3.4	Michelin Pilot Sport Cup
Alpina	B3 GT3	2012-10	7.49 Min	1.12,2 Min	4.5	15.8	Horst von Saurma	2012–03 to 2015-02	408	3.7	Michelin Pilot Sport Cup
Chevrolet	Corvette Z06	2007-06-04	7.49 Min	1.11,7 Min	4.5	13.6	Horst von Saurma	2006–02 to 2013-06	512	2.9	Goodyear Eagle F1 Supercar EMT
BMW	M3 CSL Coupé	2003-08-01	7.50 Min	1.13,5 Min	4.8	16.7	Horst von Saurma	2003–03 to 2003-12	360	3.8	Michelin Pilot Sport Cup
Porsche	911 Carrera S	2008-04-21	7.50 Min	1.13,4 Min	4.4	14.8	Horst von Saurma	2008–06 to 2011-08	385	3.8	Michelin Pilot Sport Cup [N0]
Lamborghini	Murciélago	2002-06-21	7.50 Min	1.12,0 Min	3.9	12.8	Horst von Saurma	2001–10 to 2006-07	580	3.1	Pirelli P Zero Rosso
Aston	Martin GT8 Vantage	2017-03	7.50 Min	1.11,1 Min	4.8	15.6	Christian Gebhardt	2017-01	446	3.4	Michelin Pilot Sport Cup 2
Mercedes	SL 65 AMG Black Series	2009-05	7.51 Min	1.12,2 Min	3.8	11.1	Horst von Saurma	2009–03 to 2010-05	670	2.7	Dunlop SP Sport Maxx GT
BMW	M4 Coupé	2014-07	7.52 Min	1.12,8 Min	4.1	13.6	Horst von Saurma	2014-03	431	3.7	Michelin Pilot Super Sport
Lamborghini	Gallardo	2003-12-21	7.52 Min	1.11,8 Min	4.0	13.0	Horst von Saurma	2003–04 to 2005-10	500	3.2	Pirelli P Zero Rosso
Aston Martin	V12 Vantage S	2014-08-30	7.52 Min	1.11,9 Min	4.1	12.6	Horst von Saurma	2013–08 to 2014-11	573	2.9	Pirelli P Zero Corsa
Ford	GT	2006-02	7.52 Min	1.14,1 Min	3.9	11.8	Horst von Saurma	2005–10 to 2006-12	550	2.9	Goodyear Eagle F1 Supercar
Porsche	Panamera Turbo S	2012-04	7.52 Min	1.12,3 Min	3.7	13.0	Horst von Saurma	2011–06 to 2013-01	550	3.7	Michelin Pilot Sport
Mercedes	SLR McLaren	2004-06-14	7.52 Min	1.13,5 Min	3.9	11.1	Horst von Saurma	2004–03 to 2007-09	626	2.8	Michelin Pilot Sport 2
Porsche	Boxster Spyder	2015-11	7.52 Min	1.11,3 Min	4.5	14.6	Christian Gebhardt	2015–05 to 2015-12	375	3.7	Pirelli P Zero
Lamborghini	Gallardo LP 560-4	2008-11	7.52 Min	1.11,3 Min	3.7	11.3	Horst von Saurma	2008–05 to 2013-11	560	2.5	Pirelli P Zero Corsa
Mercedes	CLK DTM AMG	2005-03-06	7.54 Min	1.12,5 Min	3.9	11.8	Marcus Schurig	2004–10 to 2004-12	582	3.0	Dunlop SP Super Sport Race
Porsche	911 GT3	2003-06-26	7.54 Min	1.13,2 Min	4.5	14.8	Horst von Saurma	2003–04 to 2005-07	381	3.8	Michelin Pilot Sport [N2]
Porsche	911 Turbo	2007-05-31	7.54 Min	1.11,9 Min	3.7	12.6	Horst von Saurma	2006–05 to 2009-08	480	3.4	Michelin Pilot Sport Cup [N0] *
BMW	M5 Competition	2014-12	7.54 Min	1.13,0 Min	4.0	12.3	Horst von Saurma	2013-06	575	3.3	Michelin Pilot Super Sport
Mercedes	E 63 AMG S 4Matic	2013-09	7.55 Min	1.13,5 Min	3.7	11.8	Horst von Saurma	2013–03 to 2016-03	585	3.3	Continental Sport Contact 5
Ferrari	F 430	2006-01	7.55 Min	1.12,7 Min	4.0	12.6	Horst von Saurma	2005–03 to 2009-08	490	3.1	Pirelli P Zero Corsa
Porsche	911 Turbo	2000-06	7.56 Min	1.14,6 Min	4.1	14.6	Horst von Saurma	1999–09 to 2005-07	420	3.9	Pirelli P Zero Assimetrico
Ferrari	Challenge Stradale	2004-02-21	7.56 Min	1.13,0 Min	4.4	15.5	Horst von Saurma	2003–09 to 2005-03	425	3.2	Pirelli P Zero Corsa
Ferrari	California	2010-06	7.56 Min	1.13,5 Min	4.1	14.6	Horst von Saurma	2009–03 to 2014-07	490	3.4	Pirelli P Zero
AC Schnitzer	Tension	2007-04	7.57 Min	1.13,5 Min	4.5	13.6	Horst von Saurma	2005–06 to 2005-12	552	3.2	Dunlop SP Super Sport Race
AC Schnitzer	M6 Gran CoupÃ©	2015-02	7.58 Min	1.12,5 Min	4.5	12.1	Horst von Saurma	2013-04	620	3.1	Michelin Pilot Super Sport
Ford	Focus RS (Reader Motorsport)	2011-01	7.58 Min	1.11,2 Min	5.4	17.7	Horst von Saurma	2011–02 to 2015-05	363	3.9	Dunlop Direzza
Lotus	Evora 400	2016-03	7.59 Min	1.12,3 Min	4.6	15.5	Christian Gebhardt	2015–09 to 2016-10	406	3.4	Michelin Pilot Super Sport
Mercedes	CLS 63 AMG	2013-07	7.59 Min	1.13,9 Min	4.5	13.1	Horst von Saurma	2013–03 to 2014-07	557	3.3	Pirelli P Zero Corsa
Audi	RS5 Coupé	2012-06	7.59 Min	1.14,3 Min	4.4	15.6	Horst von Saurma	2012–03 to 2015-07	450	3.9	Pirelli P Zero
BMW	M2 Coupé	2016-05-22	8.01 Min	1.12,2 Min	4.5	16.3	Christian Gebhardt	2016-03	370	4.3	Michelin Pilot Super Sport
Mercedes	C 63 AMG Coupé	2013-03	8.01 Min	1.13,6 Min	4.4	13.6	Horst von Saurma	2011–06 to 2015-09	487	3.5	Continental Sport Contact 5P
Aston Martin	DBS	2009-01	8.02 Min	1.13,5 Min	4.5	13.8	Horst von Saurma	2007–12 to 2012-10	517	3.2	Pirelli P Zero
Jaguar	XKR-S	2012-03	8.03 Min	1.14,4 Min	4.4	13.3	Horst von Saurma	2011–05 to 2014-10	550	3.1	Pirelli P Zero
Mercedes	AMG A 45 4Matic	2016-02-29	8.04 Min	1.13,5 Min	4.1	16.3	Christian Gebhardt	2015-09	381	4.0	Michelin Pilot Sport Cup 2
Audi	R8 4.2 FSI Quattro	2007-07-01	8.04 Min	1.12,7 Min	4.6	16.2	Horst von Saurma	2007–06 to 2011-04	420	3.8	Pirelli P Zero Corsa
Lamborghini	Diablo GT	2000-07-30	8.04 Min	1.14,4 Min	4.4	12.8	Horst von Saurma	1999–04 to 2001-06	575	2.6	Pirelli P Zero
Porsche	Boxster S	2012-07	8.04 Min	1.13,9 Min	5.0	18.6	Horst von Saurma	2012–04 to 2015-12	315	4.4	Pirelli P Zero
Ferrari	575M Maranello	2002-12-26	8.05 Min	1.14,7 Min	4.5	13.8	Horst von Saurma	2002–03 to 2005-11	515	3.3	Pirelli P Zero Assimetrico
Porsche	Cayman S	2013-06	8.05 Min	1.14,1 Min	4.8	17.6	Horst von Saurma	2013–03 to 2014-07	325	4.3	Pirelli P Zero
Porsche	911 Carrera S	2005-05-13	8.05 Min	1.14,3 Min	4.8	16.0	Horst von Saurma	2004–07 to 2008-08	355	4.2	Michelin Pilot Sport 2 [N1]
VW	Golf GTI TCR	2019-11-21	8.05 Min	1.13,8 Min	5.7	21.1	Christian Gebhardt		290	4.9	Michelin Pilot Sport Cup 2 [N0]
Audi	RS 6 Avant	2014-01	8.05 Min	1.13,8 Min	3.9	13.1	Horst von Saurma	2013–04 to 2014-11	560	3.5	Pirelli P Zero [R01]
BMW	M3	2007-12-14	8.05 Min	1.14,3 Min	4.8	15.6	Horst von Saurma	2008–03 to 2011-12	420	4.0	Michelin Pilot Sport Cup *
BMW	M5	2012-09	8.05 Min	1.13,4 Min	4.3	13.0	Horst von Saurma	2011–09 to 2014-08	560	3.4	Michelin Pilot Super Sport
Mercedes	CLK 63 AMG Black Series	2008-03	8.05 Min	1.13,8 Min	4.3	14.6	Horst von Saurma	2007–08 to 2009-01	507	3.4	Pirelli P Zero Corsa
Ford	Focus RS	2017-01	8.06 Min	1.14,2 Min	5.5	20.8	Christian Gebhardt	2016-01	350	4.4	Michelin Pilot Sport Cup 2 *
Honda	NSX-R	2002-08-26	8.09 Min	1.14,6 Min	4.9	18.2	Horst von Saurma	1994–10 to 1997-07	280	4.3	Bridgestone Potenza RE070
Audi	RS 4	2006-06-13	8.09 Min	1.15,4 Min	4.6	16.8	Horst von Saurma	2005–09 to 2007-09	420	4.2	Pirelli P Zero Corsa
Lamborghini	Diablo SV	1997-12-08	8.09 Min	1.16,4 Min	4.6	14.8	Horst von Saurma	1997–05 to 1998-06	520	2.9	Pirelli Assimetrico
Audi	TT RS Coupé	2010-02	8.09 Min	1.15,0 Min	4.6	17.7	Horst von Saurma	2009–06 to 2014-07	340	4.4	Continental Sport Contact 5
Porsche	Cayman R	2011-10	8.10 Min	1.12,4 Min	4.5	16.8	Horst von Saurma	2011–02 to 2012-08	330	4.2	Bridgestone Potenza RE050A
Alpina	B6 S Coupé	2008-05-05	8.10 Min	1.14,8 Min	4.4	13.1	Horst von Saurma	2007–11 to 2010-07	530	3.2	Michelin Pilot Sport 2
KTM	X-Bow	2010-04	8.10 Min	1.10,2 Min	4.6	22.2	Horst von Saurma	2008–08 to 2011-01	240	3.6	Toyo Proxes R888
Mercedes	E 63 AMG	2010-03	8.10 Min	1.14,0 Min	4.5	14.6	Horst von Saurma	2009–08 to 2011-07	525	3.5	Continental Sport Contact 5
Mercedes	A 45 AMG 4Matic	2014-03-28	8.10 Min	1.14,9 Min	4.5	17.1	Horst von Saurma	2013–06 to 2015-08	360	4.3	Dunlop Sport Maxx RT
Mercedes	SL 55 AMG	2002-04-26	8.12 Min	1.18,4 Min	4.1		Horst von Saurma	2001–08 to 2002-10	476	4.1	Pirelli P Zero Rosso
Dodge	Viper SRT-10	2007-03-22	8.13 Min	1.14,9 Min	4.5	14.0	Horst von Saurma	2003–10 to 2008-05	506	3.1	Michelin Pilot Sport
BMW	M5	2004-12-22	8.13 Min	1.16,5 Min	4.5	13.8	Horst von Saurma	2004–09 to 2009-10	507	3.6	Continental Sport Contact 2
Artega	GT	2010-12	8.13 Min	1.13,0 Min	4.5	19.0	Horst von Saurma	2009–10 to 2014-12	300	3.7	Continental Force Contact
Mercedes	C 63 AMG	2009-02	8.13 Min	1.15,7 Min	4.5	14.6	Horst von Saurma	2007–07 to 2010-12	457	3.7	Michelin Pilot Sport 2 *
Seat	Leon SC Cupra 280	2015-01-13	8.14 Min	1.14,7 Min	6.0	21.5	Horst von Saurma	2014–03 to 2015-11	280	4.9	Michelin Pilot Sport Cup 2
Maserati	GranTurismo MC	2012-11	8.14 Min	1.13,7 Min	4.8	15.8	Horst von Saurma	2011-08	460	4.0	Pirelli P Zero Corsa
Alpina	B3	2014-05-31	8.14 Min	1.15,3 Min	4.3	14.6	Horst von Saurma	2013-03	410	4.1	Michelin Pilot Super Sport
Mercedes	SL 65 AMG	2005-02-07	8.14 Min	1.15,6 Min	4.3	13.1	Horst von Saurma	2004–06 to 2006-03	612	3.4	Bridgestone Potenza RE050A
Alpina	B3 Coupé	2008-12	8.14 Min	1.16,1 Min	4.9	17.6	Herzog	2007–06 to 2010-05	360	4.3	Michelin Pilot Sport
VW	Golf R	2014-10	8.15 Min	1.16,0 Min	5.4	20.0	Horst von Saurma	2013–09 to 2017-01	300	4.9	Bridgestone Potenza RE050A
Chevrolet	Corvette	2005-08-14	8.15 Min	1.14,8 Min	5.1	16.7	Horst von Saurma	2004–01 to 2008-02	404	3.7	Goodyear Eagle F1
BMW	1er M Coupe	2011-07	8.15 Min	1.14,1 Min	4.6	17.2	Horst von Saurma	2011–03 to 2012-04	340	4.6	Michelin Pilot Sport
Alpina	Roadster S	2005-07-04	8.15 Min	1.14,4 Min	5.0	17.7	Horst von Saurma	2004–04 to 2006-01	300	4.6	Michelin Pilot Sport Cup
Honda	Civic Type R	2016-04	8.15 Min	1.15,8 Min	6.0	21.2	Christian Gebhardt	2015-04	310	4.6	Continental Sport Contact 6
Aston Martin	DB9	2007-03-22	8.16 Min	1.17,7 Min	5.3	16.5	Horst von Saurma	2008–11 to 2010-07	476	3.9	Bridgestone Potenza RE050
Audi	TTS Coupé 2.0 TFSI	2015-06	8.16 Min	1.14,4 Min	4.8	19.7	Christian Gebhardt	2014-11	310	4.7	Pirelli P Zero
AC Schnitzer	V8 Topster	2005-01-22	8.16 Min	1.13,7 Min	5.1	15.8	Marcus Schurig	2006–03 to 2008-08	450	3.4	Michelin Pilot Sport Cup
BMW	M235i Coupé	2015-04	8.16 Min	1.15,4 Min	4.9	18.5	Horst von Saurma	2015–02 to 2016-09	326	4.7	Michelin Pilot Super Sport
Porsche	911 Carrera	2001-10	8.17 Min	1.17,1 Min	4.8	17.2	Horst von Saurma	2001–07 to 2004-07	320	4.5	Continental Sport Contact 2
Porsche	Cayman S	2009-12-25	8.17 Min	1.14,2 Min	4.8	18.1	Horst von Saurma	2009–02 to 2012-08	320	4.5	Bridgestone Potenza RE050A [N1]
Lexus	IS F	2008-09	8.18 Min	1.15,8 Min	4.9	16.2	Horst von Saurma	2008–02 to 2010-11	423	4.0	Michelin Pilot Sport
BMW	M135i	2013-01	8.18 Min	1.15,7 Min	4.9	18.1	Horst von Saurma	2012–07 to 2015-02	320	4.6	Michelin Pilot Super Sport
Maserati	GranSport	2005-09-17	8.18 Min	1.16,2 Min	4.9	17.1	Horst von Saurma	2004–09 to 2007-04	400	4.2	Pirelli P Zero Rosso
BMW	Z8 Roadster	2000-08	8.18 Min	1.17,4 Min	4.8	16.7	Horst von Saurma	2000–03 to 2003-08	400	4.2	Bridgestone Potenza RE040
Porsche	Boxster S	2009-12	8.18 Min	1.15,0 Min	4.8	19.0	Horst von Saurma	2009–02 to 2011-11	310	4.6	Bridgestone Potenza RE050A [N1]
Audi	RS3 Sportback	2011-06	8.20 Min	1.15,4 Min	4.1		Horst von Saurma	2011–03 to 2013-10	340	4.8	Continental Sport Contact 5
Audi	RS 6	2002-09-26	8.20 Min	1.17,6 Min	4.9	18.7	Horst von Saurma	2002–08 to 2003-05	450	4.0	Continental Sport Contact 2
Opel	Astra GTC OPC	2012-12	8.20 Min	1.16,9 Min	6.5	24.8	Horst von Saurma	2009–09 to 2015-03	280	5.5	Pirelli P Zero
Mercedes	C 55 AMG	2007-03-22	8.22 Min	1.18,6 Min	5.3	18.2	Horst von Saurma	2004–04 to 2006-12	367	4.4	Pirelli P Zero Rosso
BMW	M3 Coupé	2000-12-30	8.22 Min	1.17,6 Min	5.1	18.1	Horst von Saurma	2000–09 to 2006-05	343	4.5	Michelin Pilot Sport
Porsche	Boxster S	2006-04-06	8.23 Min	1.16,2 Min	5.5	20.7	Horst von Saurma	2004–11 to 2006-08	280	5.0	Michelin Pilot Sport [N1]
Renault	Clio R.S. TCe 220	2016-01	8.23 Min	1.15,5 Min	6.6	25.6	Christian Gebhardt	2015–07 to 2016-07	220	5.8	Dunlop Direzza 03G [R2]
Subaru	Impreza 2.0 WRX STi	2007-03-23	8.24 Min	1.17,9 Min	5.9	25.8	Horst von Saurma	2002–12 to 2005-08	265	5.7	Bridgestone Potenza RE070 *
BMW	X6 M	2009-11	8.24 Min	1.17,1 Min	4.6	16.2	Horst von Saurma	2009–09 to 2012-01	555	4.2	Bridgestone Dueler HP Sport
Mercedes	SLK 55 AMG	2005-04-11	8.24 Min	1.17,1 Min	4.8	16.7	Horst von Saurma	2004–09 to 2008-04	360	4.2	Pirelli P Zero Rosso
Porsche	Cayman S	2006-11-20	8.25 Min	1.15,9 Min	5.6	19.7	Horst von Saurma	2005–10 to 2008-12	295	4.7	Michelin Pilot Sport 2 [N1]
Jaguar	XKR	2006-12-13	8.25 Min	1.16,9 Min	4.9	16.7	Horst von Saurma	2006–07 to 2009-03	416	4.2	Dunlop SP Sport Maxx
Mitsubishi	Carisma GT Evo VII	2002-11-26	8.25 Min	1.18,2 Min	4.8	21.8	Horst von Saurma	2001–07 to 2004-03	280	4.9	Yokohama Advan
Lotus	Exige S	2008-06	8.25 Min	1.15,3 Min	5.1	22.7	Horst von Saurma	2011–01 to 2011-07	221	4.2	Yokohama Advan A048
Audi	RS4	2000-10	8.25 Min	1.18,2 Min	4.7	17.0	Horst von Saurma	2000–01 to 2001-12	380	4.2	Pirelli P Zero Rosso
BMW	335i Coupé	2006-10	8.26 Min	1.17,8 Min	5.5	20.7	Horst von Saurma	2006–09 to 2010-02	306	5.2	Bridgestone Potenza RE050A
Ford	Focus RS	2009-08	8.26 Min	1.17,8 Min	6.0	23.2	Horst von Saurma	2009–06 to 2010-07	305	4.8	Continental Sport Contact 3
Audi	S5 4.2 FSI Quattro	2008-01	8.26 Min	1.17,2 Min	5.1	19.1	Horst von Saurma	2007–03 to 2011-07	354	4.8	Michelin Pilot Sport
Subaru	WRX STI 4x4	2015-07	8.28 Min	1.16,8 Min	5.4	22.2	Christian Gebhardt	2014-05	300	5.0	Dunlop SportMaxx RT
Mini	John Cooper Works Pro	2017-04	8.28 Min	1.17,8 Min	6.9	24.8	Christian Gebhardt	2015-05	231	5.5	Pirelli P Zero
Renault	Mégane Coupé TCe 250	2011-02	8.29 Min	1.17,1 Min	6.4	23.6	Horst von Saurma	2008–11 to 2012-01	250	5.8	Michelin Pilot Sport PS2
Audi	TTS Coupé 2.0 TFSI	2008-10	8.29 Min	1.16,1 Min	5.6	21.8	Horst von Saurma	2008–06 to 2010-07	272	5.3	Michelin Pilot Sport 2
VW	Golf GTI Performance	2013-08	8.29 Min	1.17,8 Min	6.5	24.7	Horst von Saurma	2013–03 to 2016-11	230	6.0	Bridgestone Potenza S001
Maserati	Coupé Cambiocorsa	2002-10-26	8.30 Min	1.19,2 Min	5.1	16.7	Horst von Saurma	2002–04 to 2004-09	390	4.4	Michelin Pilot Sport
Lotus	Exige	2004-08-22	8.32 Min	1.16,5 Min	5.5	27.2	Horst von Saurma	2005–01 to 2011-07	192	4.7	Yokohama Advan A048
BMW	Z4 Coupé 3.0si	2006-08	8.32 Min	1.17,8 Min	6.0	24.5	Horst von Saurma	2006–06 to 2008-08	265	5.2	Bridgestone Potenza RE050A
Opel	Speedster Turbo	2007-03-22	8.34 Min	1.17,1 Min	5.0	22.8	Horst von Saurma	2003–02 to 2005-09	200	5.0	Bridgestone Potenza RE040
VW	Golf R	2010-10	8.34 Min	1.17,9 Min	6.0	24.3	Horst von Saurma	2009–10 to 2012-08	270	5.6	Dunlop SP Sport Maxx GT
Mini	John Cooper Works	2015-12-23	8.35 Min	1.18,2 Min	6.5	25.1	Christian Gebhardt	2015-05	231	5.6	Pirelli P Zero
Brabus	C V8 Sportcoupé	2002-02-26	8.35 Min	1.19,8 Min	4.6	15.5	Horst von Saurma	2005–06 to 2008-04	426	3.8	Pirelli P Zero Assimetrico
Mini	John Cooper Works	2009-04	8.35 Min	1.18,5 Min	6.5	26.8	Horst von Saurma	2007–10 to 2010-01	211	5.7	Continental Sport Contact 3 SSR
BMW	M3	1997-03-01	8.35 Min	1.18,4 Min	5.8	20.7	Horst von Saurma	1995–07 to 1998-01	321	4.7	Michelin MXX3
VW	Golf R32 4Motion	2003-02-26	8.37 Min	1.20,7 Min	7.0	27.7	Horst von Saurma	2002–08 to 2003-12	241	6.4	Michelin Pilot Sport
Maserati	3200 GT	2000-09	8.37 Min	1.18,4 Min	4.9	18.3	Horst von Saurma	1998–10 to 2002-02	370	4.2	Michelin Pilot Sport
VW	Golf GTI Edition 35	2011-09	8.38 Min	1.19,0 Min	6.5	24.5	Horst von Saurma	2011–08 to 2013-01	235	5.9	Dunlop SP Sport Maxx GT
Audi	TT Coupé 2.0 TFSI	2007-02-23	8.40 Min	1.18,9 Min	6.9	29.5	Horst von Saurma	2006–09 to 2010-08	200	6.6	Michelin Pilot Sport 2
Opel	Corsa 1.6 Turbo	2015-09	8.40 Min	1.18,6 Min	7.0	34.5	Christian Gebhardt	2015-04	207	6.2	Michelin Pilot Super Sport
Audi	S1	2014-11-29	8.41 Min	1.18,6 Min	6.1	25.1	Horst von Saurma	2014–04 to 2014-10	231	6.0	Bridgestone Potenza S001 *
Lotus	Exige	2000-11	8.42 Min	1.14,8 Min	5.9	29.5	Horst von Saurma	2000–09 to 2011-07	179	4.3	Yokohama A039
Toyota	GT86	2013-02	8.45 Min	1.19,4 Min	7.0	32.2	Horst von Saurma	2012–09 to 2015-10	200	6.5	Bridgestone Potenza *
Honda	Civic 2.0i Type-R	2001-11	8.47 Min	1.20,9 Min	7.0	28.3	Horst von Saurma	2001–07 to 2005-10	200	6.3	Bridgestone Potenza RE040
VW	Golf R32 4Motion	2006-09-20	8.49 Min	1.20,3 Min	6.9	30.1	Horst von Saurma	2005–09 to 2008-05	250	6.6	Michelin Pilot Sport 2
Alfa Romeo	156 3.2 V6 24V GTA	2002-05-26	8.51 Min	1.22,7 Min	6.3	21.8	Horst von Saurma	2002–02 to 2005-09	250	5.9	Pirelli P Zero Rosso
VW	Golf GTI	2005-12-01	8.53 Min	1.21,8 Min	6.8	34.2	Horst von Saurma	2008–05 to 2008-09	200	6.7	Michelin Pilot Exalto
Opel	Corsa 1.6 Turbo	2008-04-03	8.54 Min	1.21,4 Min	7.4	35.0	Horst von Saurma	2007–07 to 2009-11	192	5.7	Continental Sport Contact
Renault	Clio R.S.	2013-10	8.59 Min	1.20,2 Min	7.5	41.0	Horst von Saurma	2013–03 to 2015-08	200	6.3	Dunlop Sport Maxx RT *
Fiat	Grande Punto Abarth Esseesse	2009-03	9.09 Min	1.22,0 Min	7.5	39.0	Horst von Saurma	2008–09 to 2009-01	180	7.0	Pirelli P Zero

* = optional tyres

== See also ==
- Nordschleife fastest lap times
