= Porsche V10 engine =

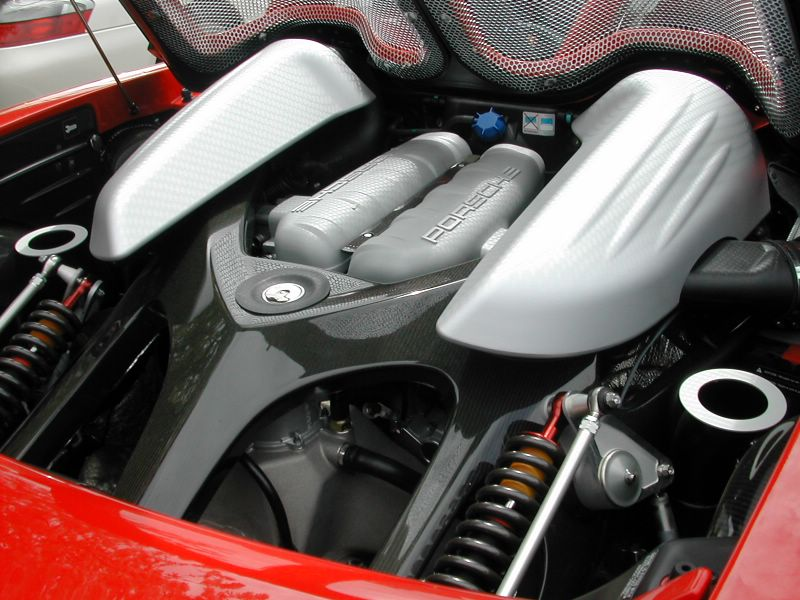

Overview
- Manufacturer: Porsche
- Production: 1998-2000 (LMP2000); 2003-2007 (Carrera GT)

Layout
- Configuration: 68° V10
- Displacement: 5.7 L (5,733 cc; 349.8 cu in)
- Cylinder bore: 98 mm (3.86 in)
- Piston stroke: 76 mm (2.99 in)
- Valvetrain: 40-valve, DOHC, four-valves per cylinder
- Compression ratio: 12.0:1

Combustion
- Fuel system: Multiport Injection
- Fuel type: Gasoline
- Oil system: Dry sump
- Cooling system: Water-cooled

Output
- Power output: 603–700 hp (450–522 kW)
- Torque output: 435–460 lb⋅ft (590–624 N⋅m)

The Porsche V10 engine is a naturally-aspirated, V-10, internal combustion piston engine, designed and developed by Porsche, originally as a concept design for Formula One motor racing in the 1990s, and later Le Mans racing, but eventually used in the Porsche Carrera GT sports car; between 2003 and 2007. The engine is derived from the unsuccessful Porsche 3512 3.5-liter 80° V12 engine, used in the early 1990s.

== Background ==
A V10 replacement for the 3512 was in development at the time of Porsche's withdrawal from Formula One. This engine would not be completed until several years later, when it was modified for use in the stillborn Porsche LMP project in 2000. The engine design eventually was re-used when a further variant was chosen as the powerplant of the Porsche Carrera GT supercar.

== Technical specifications ==
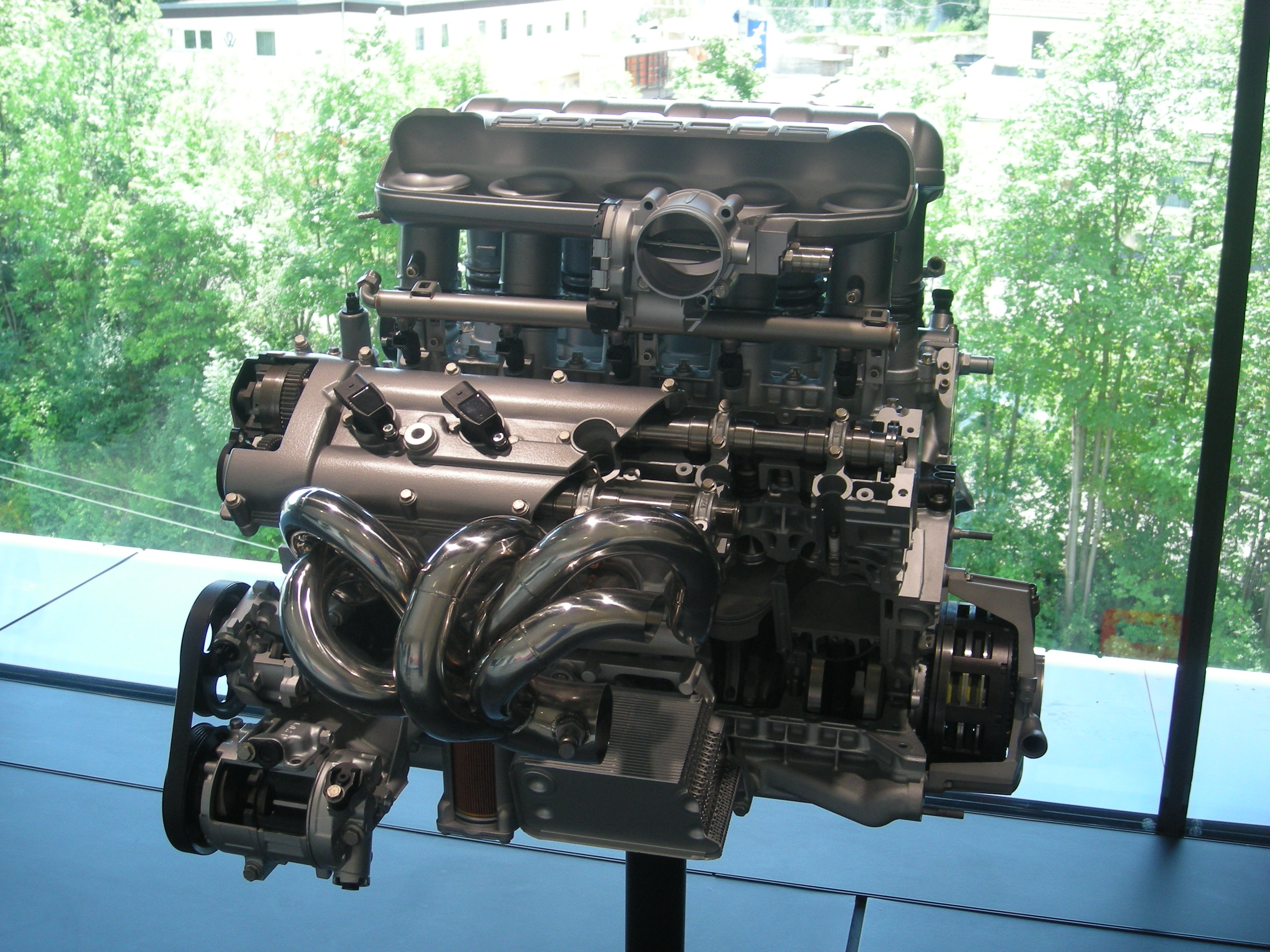
5.7 litre V10 engine

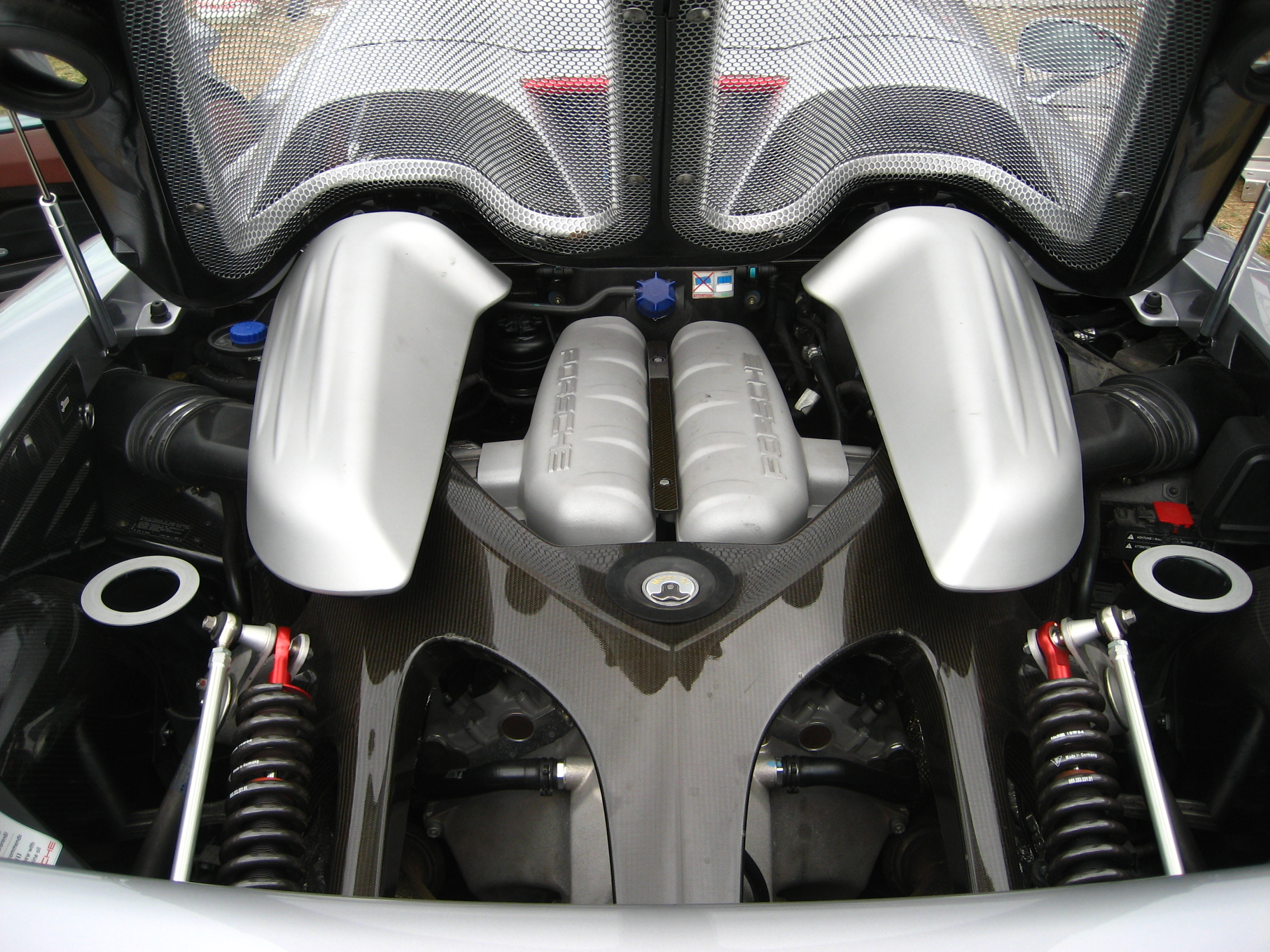
Porsche Carrera GT engine bay

- Porsche Carrera GT Engine
  - Layout: Longitudinal, rear mid-engine, rear-wheel-drive layout
  - Engine type: 68° V10, aluminium block and heads
  - Code: 980/01
  - Valvetrain: DOHC (chain-driven), 4 valves per cylinder (40 valves total), variable valve timing on intake camshafts, sodium-cooled exhaust valves
  - Bore × stroke: 98 mm × 76 mm (3.86 in × 2.99 in), Nikasil coated bores, forged titanium connecting rods, forged pistons
  - Displacement: 5.7 L (5,733 cc; 349.8 cu in)
  - Compression ratio: 12.0:1
  - Rated power: 450 kW (612 PS; 603 hp) at 8,000 rpm
  - Max. torque: 590 N⋅m (435 lb⋅ft) at 5,750 rpm
  - Specific output: 78.493 kW/L (105 hp/L)
  - Weight to power ratio: 3.23 kg/kW (5.31 lb/hp)
  - Power to weight ratio: 0.31 kW/kg (0.19 hp/lb)
  - Redline: 8,400 rpm

== Applications ==
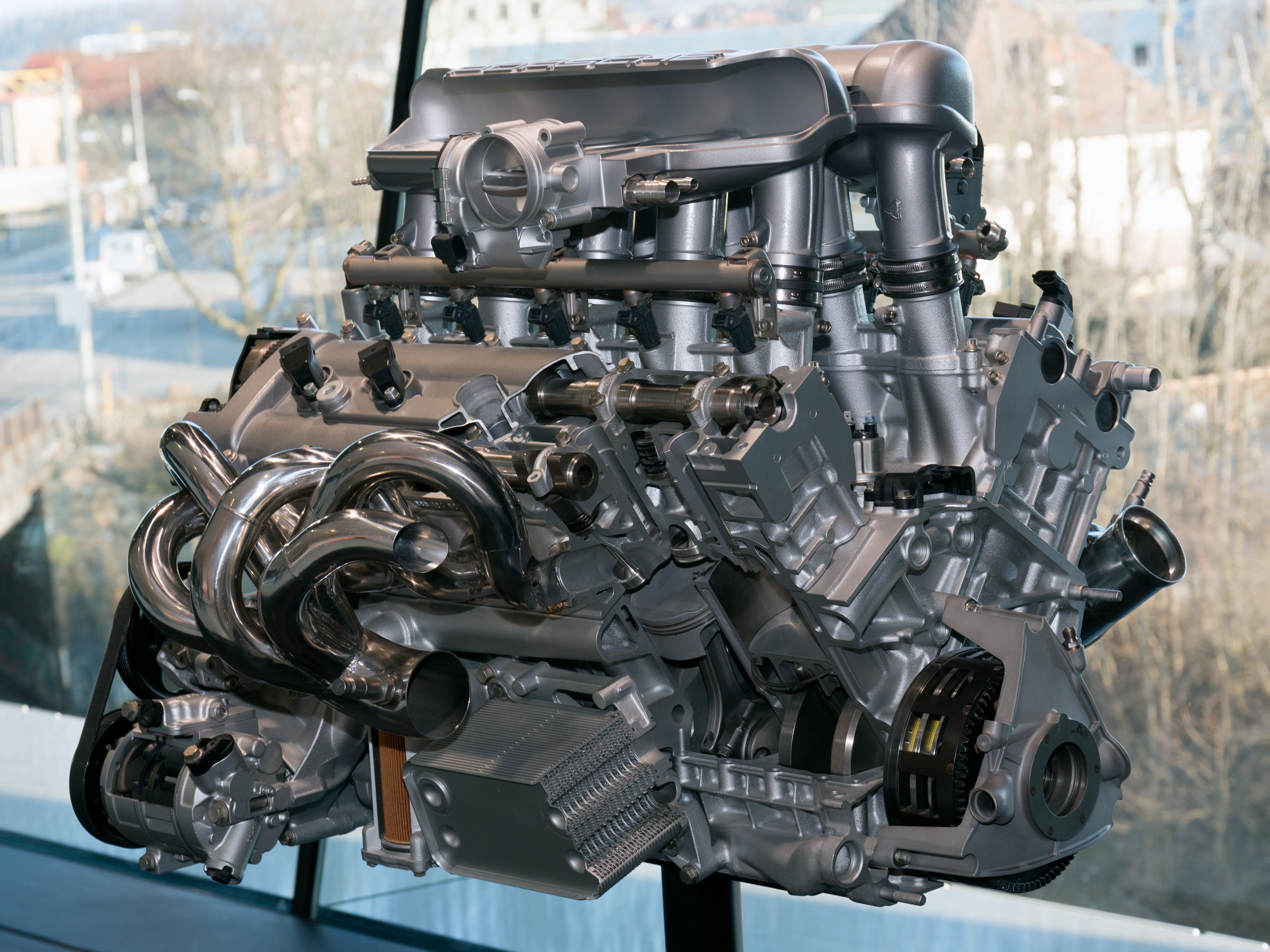
Porsche Carrera GT engine.

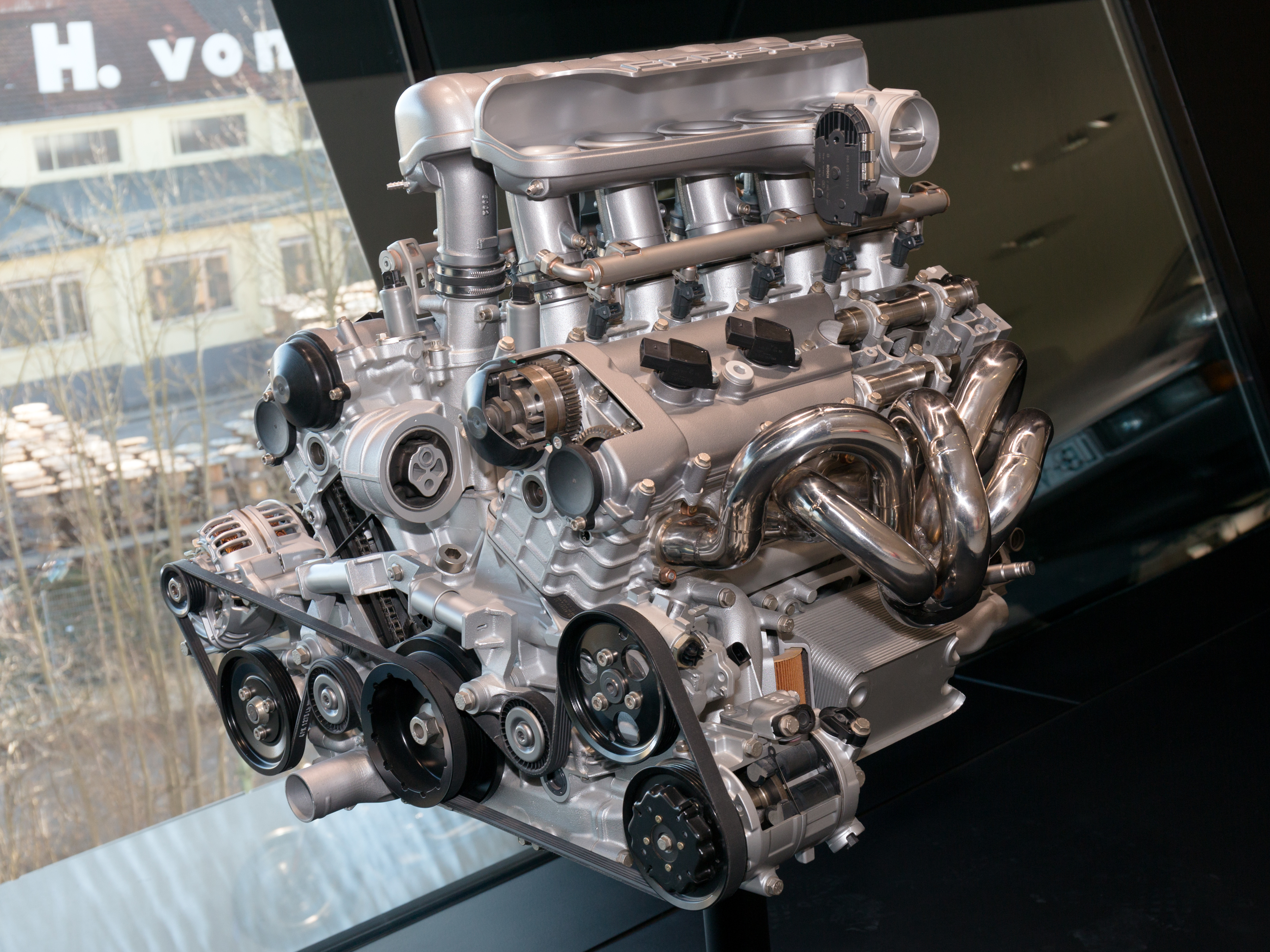
Porsche Carrera GT 5.7 L V10 engine.

=== Road cars ===
- Porsche Carrera GT (M80/01)

=== Race cars ===
- Porsche LMP2000 (9R3)
