= V10 engine =

Piston engine with ten cylinders in V configuration

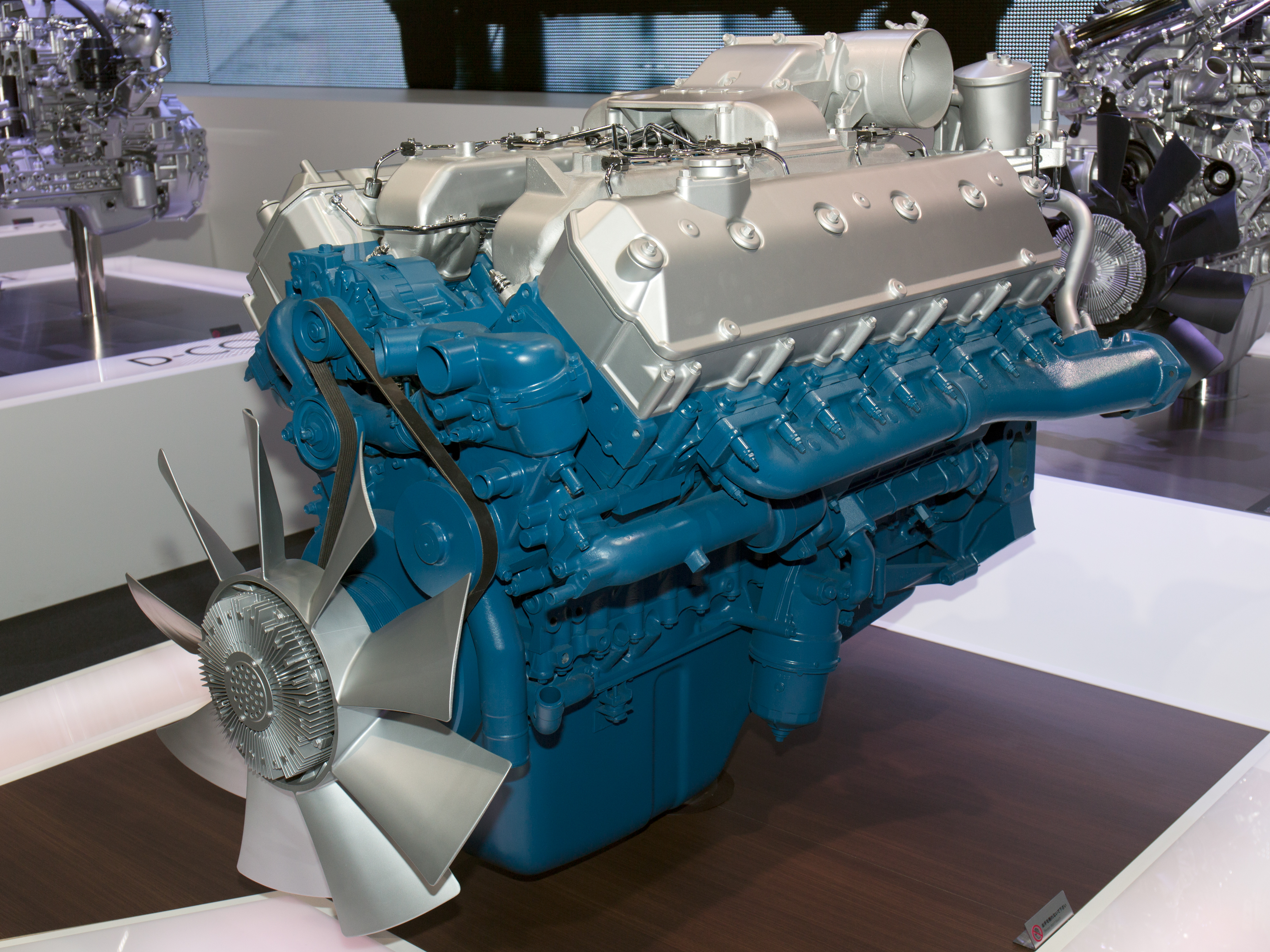
Isuzu 10TD1 diesel engine

A V10 engine is a ten-cylinder piston engine where two banks of five cylinders are arranged in a V configuration around a common crankshaft. V10 engines are much less common than V8 and V12 engines. Several V10 diesel engines have been produced since 1965, and V10 petrol engines for road cars were first produced in 1992 with the release of the Dodge Viper.

== Design ==
The V10 configuration does not have perfect engine balance, since an unbalanced rocking couple is caused by each cylinder bank functioning as a straight-five engine. Therefore, balance shafts are sometimes used to reduce the vibrations in a V10 engine.

== Diesel engines ==
One of the first known V10 engines was used in the 1936 Busch-Sulzer ICRR 9201 prototype locomotive, of which three examples were produced in the United States.

The 1965–1984 Leopard 1 armored tank was powered by the MTU MB 838 CaM 500 37.4 L (2,282 cu in) V10 diesel engine.

Daimler-Benz produced three V10 diesel engine models (OM403, OM423 and OM443) for Mercedes-Benz NG and Neoplan buses in 1970s–1980s.

Deutz AG produced V10 diesel engines for Magirus-Deutz and Iveco trucks in 1960s–1980s.

Four Japanese commercial vehicle manufacturers (Isuzu, Hino, Mitsubishi Fuso and Nissan Diesel) produced V10 diesel engines for their heavy duty trucks and coaches in 1970s–2000s.

The 1983–2023 Tatra 815 truck was available with a 15.8 L (964 cu in) V10 engine.

The Volkswagen V10 TDI is a turbocharged V10 engine which was produced from 2002 to 2010 for use in the Volkswagen Phaeton luxury sedan and Volkswagen Touareg SUV.

== Petrol engines ==
=== Production vehicles ===
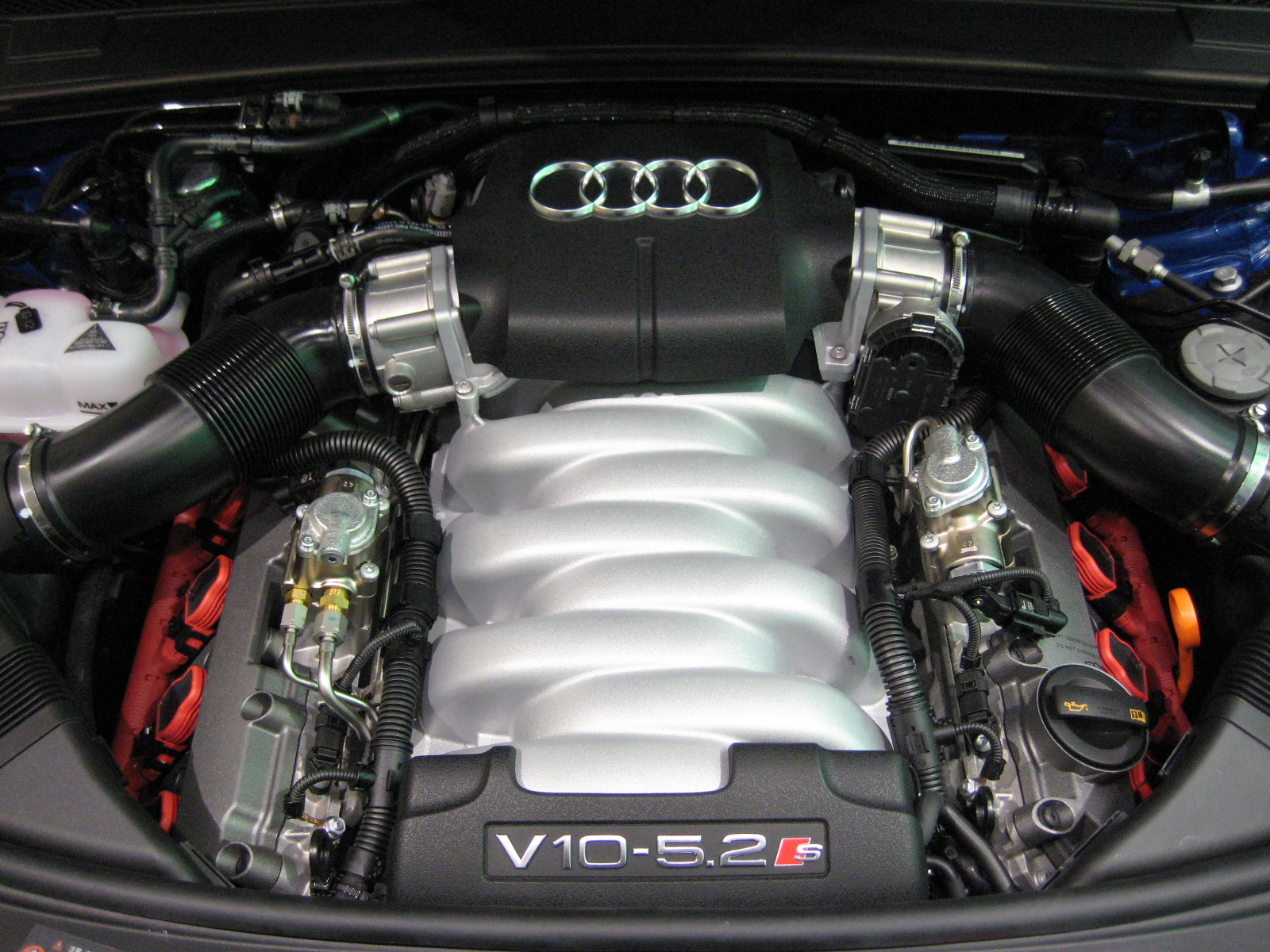
2006–2011 Audi S6 and S8 engine

V10 engines are less common than V8 and V12 engines. A V12 is only slightly more complicated and runs more smoothly, while a V8 is less complex and more economical. Nevertheless, modern engineering has made it possible to use V10 engines for applications where a V8 would produce insufficient power and a V12 would be too complicated or bulky. V10s have been used in select luxury cars, sports cars and commercial vehicles.

An early V10 petrol engine was used in the 1987 Lamborghini P140, however this prototype sports car did not reach production.

Dodge developed an early V10, originally designing a version of its LA series small block for use in trucks. The Dodge engine saw its first production use in substantially revised form in the Dodge Viper while the truck version of the engine was used starting in 1994 in the Dodge Ram. It discontinued in that application after 2003. However, 2003 also saw the introduction of the Dodge Ram SRT-10, a performance model meant to rival Ford's successful V8 powered F-150 SVT Lightning. The Viper engine (a 90-degree engine with odd firing order to obviate the need for a balance shaft) was improved during its production run, and produced as much as 477 kW (640 hp; 649 PS) in a standard state of tune from an 8.4 L version. The Viper engine was also used by Bristol in the two-seat Fighter coupe, and in other low-volume vehicles.

Ford also developed a heavy-duty V10 version of their Triton engine to replace the 460 big block in truck applications. It was introduced in the E-Series/Econoline full-size van, and also saw use in the F-Series Super Duty line and the Ford Excursion SUV, and was offered by Ford through the 2019 model year.

For the Lexus LFA, the engineers selected a V10 engine over an equivalent displacement V8 because they could not get the V8 to rev as high as a V10, and over a V12 for its lower reciprocating mass, allowing for more rapid engine response.

High-revving V10 power-plants were incorporated into supercars from Lamborghini and Porsche. BMW and Audi developed V10s for high performance cars such as BMW M5, BMW M6, Audi S6, Audi RS6, Audi S8 and Audi R8, mostly based upon their executive cars. Volkswagen also developed a V10, but as a turbo-diesel. A variant of the Volkswagen Phaeton was the first production sedan to contain a V10 of any kind.

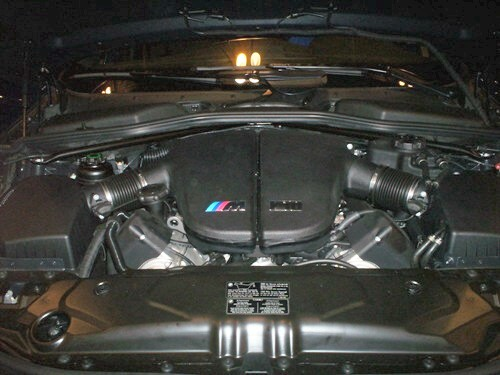
E60 BMW M5 V10 (S85)

Examples of petrol V10 production engines include:

- 1991–2017 Dodge Viper engine
- 1994–2003 Chrysler Magnum V10
- 1997–2021 Ford Triton engine
- 2003–2024 Lamborghini V10
- 2003–2007 Porsche V10 engine
- 2005–2010 BMW S85
- 2008–2010 Audi V10 TFSI
- 2009–2012 Toyota 1LR-GUE

=== Motor racing ===
One of the first known V10 engines designed for motor racing was a 3.5 L (214 cu in) prototype Formula One engine built by Alfa Romeo in 1986. Originally intended for the Ligier Formula One team, this partnership collapsed without the engine being used in any races. Alfa Romeo fitted the engine to two Alfa Romeo 164 Pro Car prototypes in 1988, however these cars also did not compete in any races.

The most widespread use of V10 racing engines has been in Formula One. Following a ban on turbocharged engines after 1988, the first V10 Formula One cars were the 1989 McLaren MP4/5 and Williams FW12. V10 engines were used by the majority of teams by the 1996 season following reduction in displacement from 3.5 to 3.0 L (214 to 183 cu in). By the 1998 Formula One season all Formula One teams used V10 engines which would remain the case until the end of the 2005 season. The V10 seemed the best compromise between the lower weight of a V8 and the higher power of a V12. Renault F1 used a flatter 110° angle in 2002 and 2003, but reverted to a more conventional 72° following the change in rules which dictated that an engine must last two race weekends. In a further change to the rules, V10s were banned for the 2006 season onwards in favor of 2.4 L V8s.

In sports car racing, the first V10 engine was used by the Peugeot 905 in the two final races of the 1990 season. This was followed by the Judd GV10 engine being used by several teams during the 1991 season and the Toyota TS010 that debuted in the last race of the season. The Audi R15 TDI was a Le Mans Prototype (LMP) racing car that used a turbocharged diesel V10 engine and competed in various endurance races in 2009 and 2010. The Audi R15 TDI set the current distance record for the 2010 24 Hours of Le Mans.

=== Commercial vehicle use ===
Until early 2021, Blue Bird Corporation offered its Vision school bus with two V10 engine options, both Ford Triton units.

== See also ==
- Flat-ten engine
