= List of Nürburgring Nordschleife lap times =

"Nordschleife"-layout

This is a list of lap times achieved by various vehicles on the Nürburgring (Nordschleife). The list itself is broken down into categories.

== The Nordschleife ==
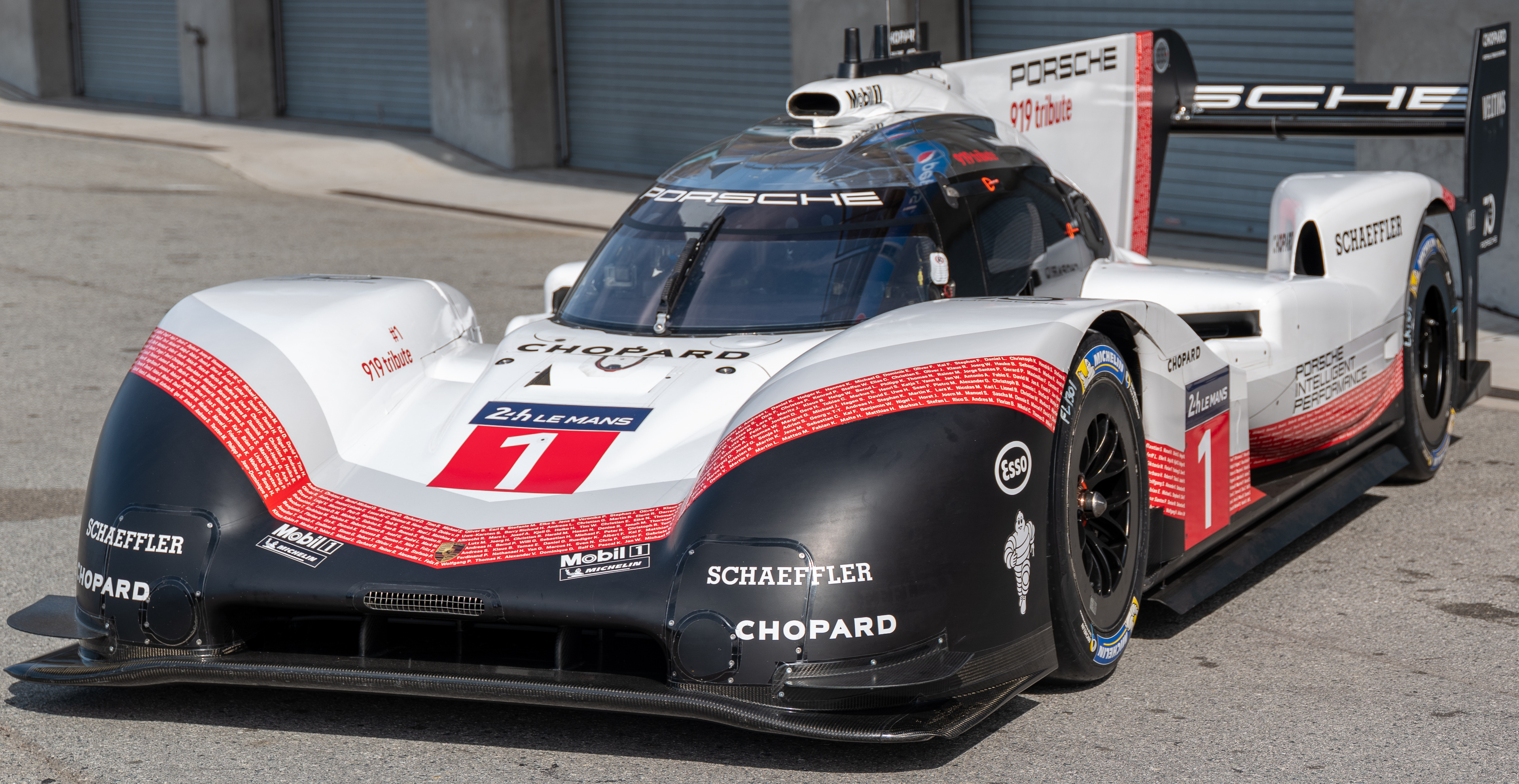
Porsche 919 Evo - Overall record holder on the modern 20,832 m (12.944 mi) full layout with a time of 5:19.546 minutes

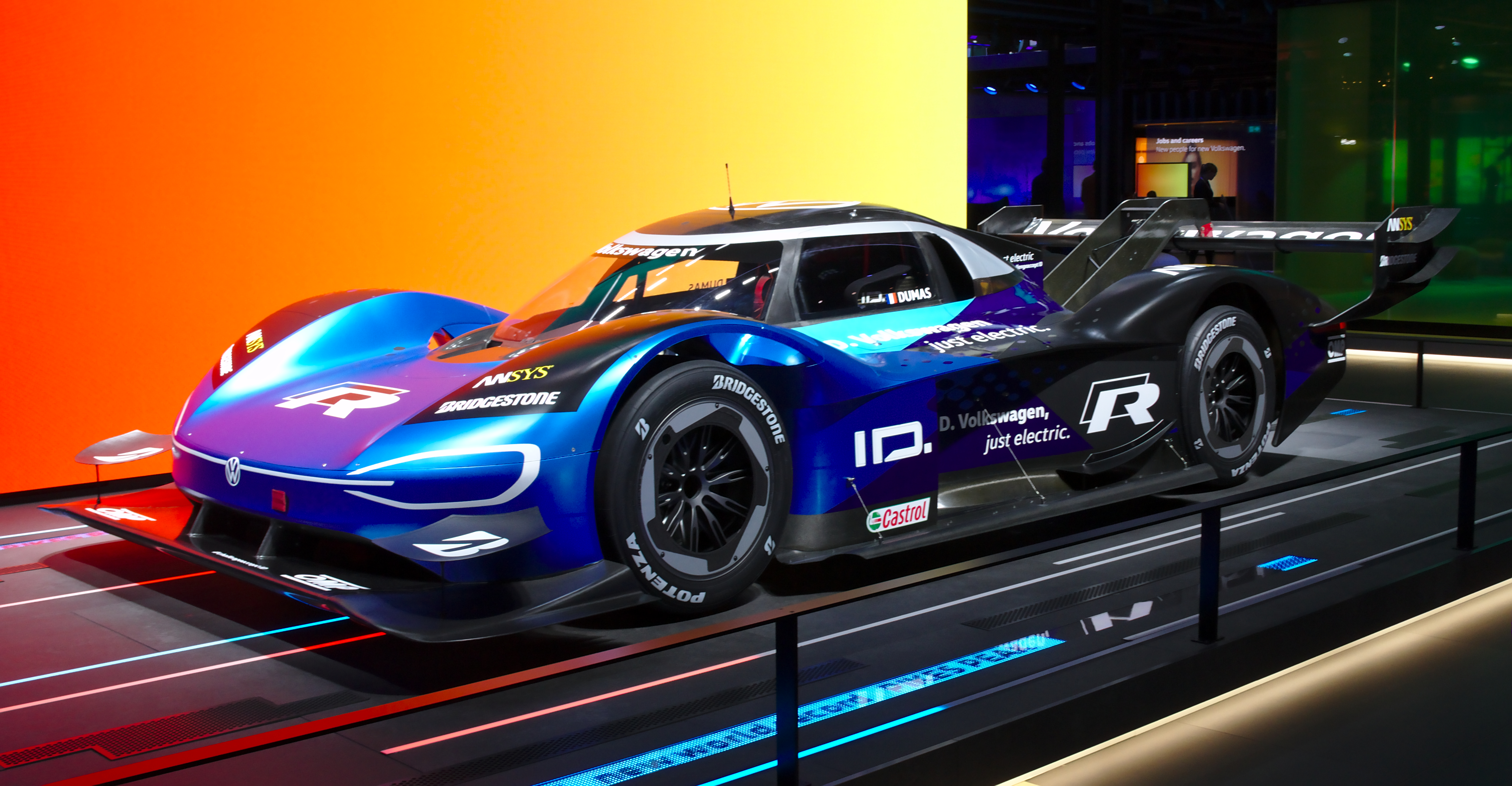
Volkswagen I.D. R - Overall electric record holder on the modern 20,832 m (12.944 mi) full layout with a time of 6:05.336 minutes

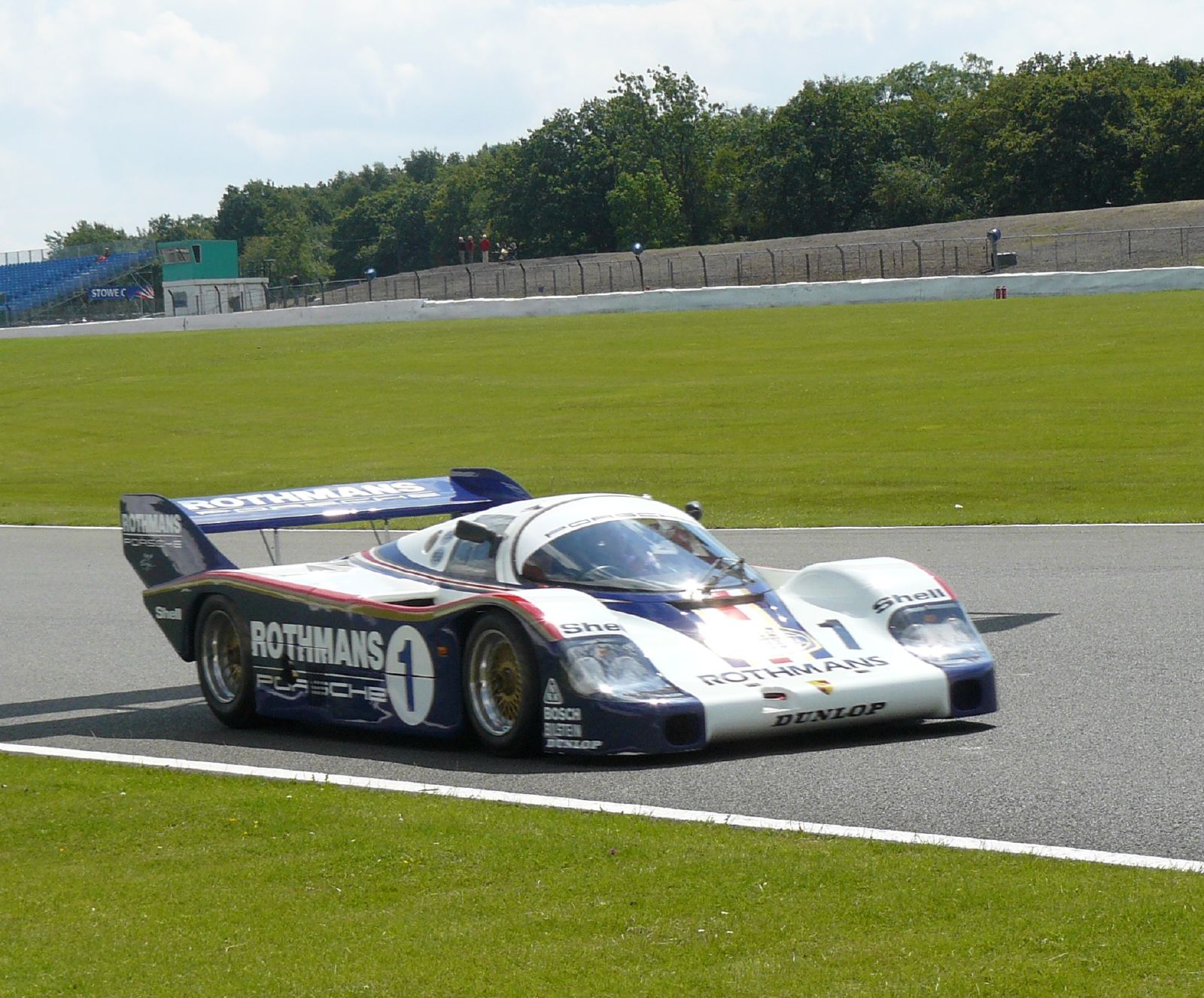
Porsche 956 - Former overall record holder with a time of 6:11.13 minutes set during a qualifying session in 1983

The Nürburgring Nordschleife (North Loop) in Germany, with its remaining 20.8 km (12.9 mi) long old section dating from 1927, is used by various motoring media outlets and vehicle manufacturers for testing. Manufacturers publish times for promotional purposes while automotive media outlets usually publish times for comparison and reporting purposes. According to Car and Driver, Nürburgring Nordschleife "record-chasing runs are a universally accepted, objective measure of a car's performance, and shaving seconds gives automakers reasons to grab some headlines." Compared to the current version, the original Nürburgring track was longer and split into three configurations. The entire track, the Gesamtstrecke (see map above) was 28.3 kilometres in length, composed of the Nordschleife (22.8 km), the Südschleife (7.7 km), and the Betonschleife – the latter a short 2 kilometer warm-up loop around the pit area. The lengths of the two segments, when considered separately, add up to more than the whole, since each circuit also incorporated some parts of the Betonschleife.

== Timing entities ==
=== Official timing by the Nürburgring ===
Along with races and timing events under the rules of their respective sanctioning bodies, the operators of the track have instituted official rules as of 2019 that govern the measurement and certification of lap time on the Nordschleife, with measurement over the full length of the track timed with a flying start. Timekeeping is supervised by a notary and the vehicles are scrutineered with regard to their series-production state.

=== Timing by media ===
The German magazine sport auto publishes its "Supertest" of cars, in which the lap time (usually driven by editor-in-chief Horst von Saurma) at the Nordschleife is the most discussed result. The magazine also runs a challenge for the fastest lap time driven with a car that is road legal (TÜV) and registered in Germany. The road legality rule also applies for the tyres.

British motorcycle magazine Performance Bikes began testing their bikes in a regular feature at the Nordschleife in March 2007 and finished in December 2007. Bikes were tested by Dale Lomas and Brendan Keirle (then known only as "The Baron"). As with sport auto, all machines tested are road-legal (MOT) and shod with road-legal Bridgestone BT002 Pro Race tyres. To date there are 28 lap times published in the regular feature. As motorcycles are forbidden to participate in industry pool sessions and after-hours test sessions, Performance Bikes were forced to test during quiet mid-week tourist sessions, where speed limits apply in some sections. This means their lap times are measured from bridge to gantry (see below) and are approximately 22 seconds shorter than a full 20,832 m (12.944 mi) Nordschleife lap.

Nordschleife runs are conducted or observed by various other media outlets, such as the British Evo Magazine or Auto Bild from Germany.

=== Timing by manufacturers ===
Manufacturers, especially those of sports cars, conduct their own timing runs and publish these for varying purposes. Manufacturers also lend support to private entities or media outlets.

=== Timing by private drivers ===
Some lap times are even claimed to have been done during tourist driving sessions. It is forbidden to race on tourist days. Additionally, there are two speed limits (one in Breidscheid, and one on "Döttinger Höhe") on tourist days.

== Controversies ==
Nordschleife runs are not without sometimes prominent critics. The British motoring programme Top Gear used the Nordschleife for their challenges, often involving Sabine Schmitz. Top Gear's James May, however, was very critical of the influence of Nordschleife lap timing, saying that it "corrupts performance when it is used by car makers to develop new models. Testing prototype cars on a circuit is nothing new, obviously: it's probably been going on since someone drove a horseless carriage onto a disused donkey derby track. But the 'Ring, through being communal and open to all, encourages a pointless scrabble for comparative lap times that isn't helping you or me." According to Popular Science, "beating the 'ring, and making a YouTube video to prove it, is about the best marketing move a sports car company can make, even one that plans to roll only a double-digits'-worth of cars out of its production facility."

The views and definitions differ among automakers and also among journalists. According to Porsche, the Porsche 918 Spyder did set a "Nurburgring record for a street-legal automobile", while the car landed on place 3 on this list behind two Radical SR8. With roof reinforced for safety reasons and observed by sport auto, the record was widely reported by the media. Magazines like Car and Driver and the wider automotive industry declared the worldwide street-legal Porsche 918 the new record holder since the SR8 didn't meet full type-approval and only could get British single-vehicle approval.

Two months later, Nissan claimed, which was also widely reported in the media, a ring record for its Nissan GT-R Nismo as "world's fastest volume production car". Engineers later confessed that the car had been "specifically tuned for the Nurburgring" with significant changes from the standard car, including the addition of non-road-legal parts. The Nissan GT-R was fourth place on this list at the time.

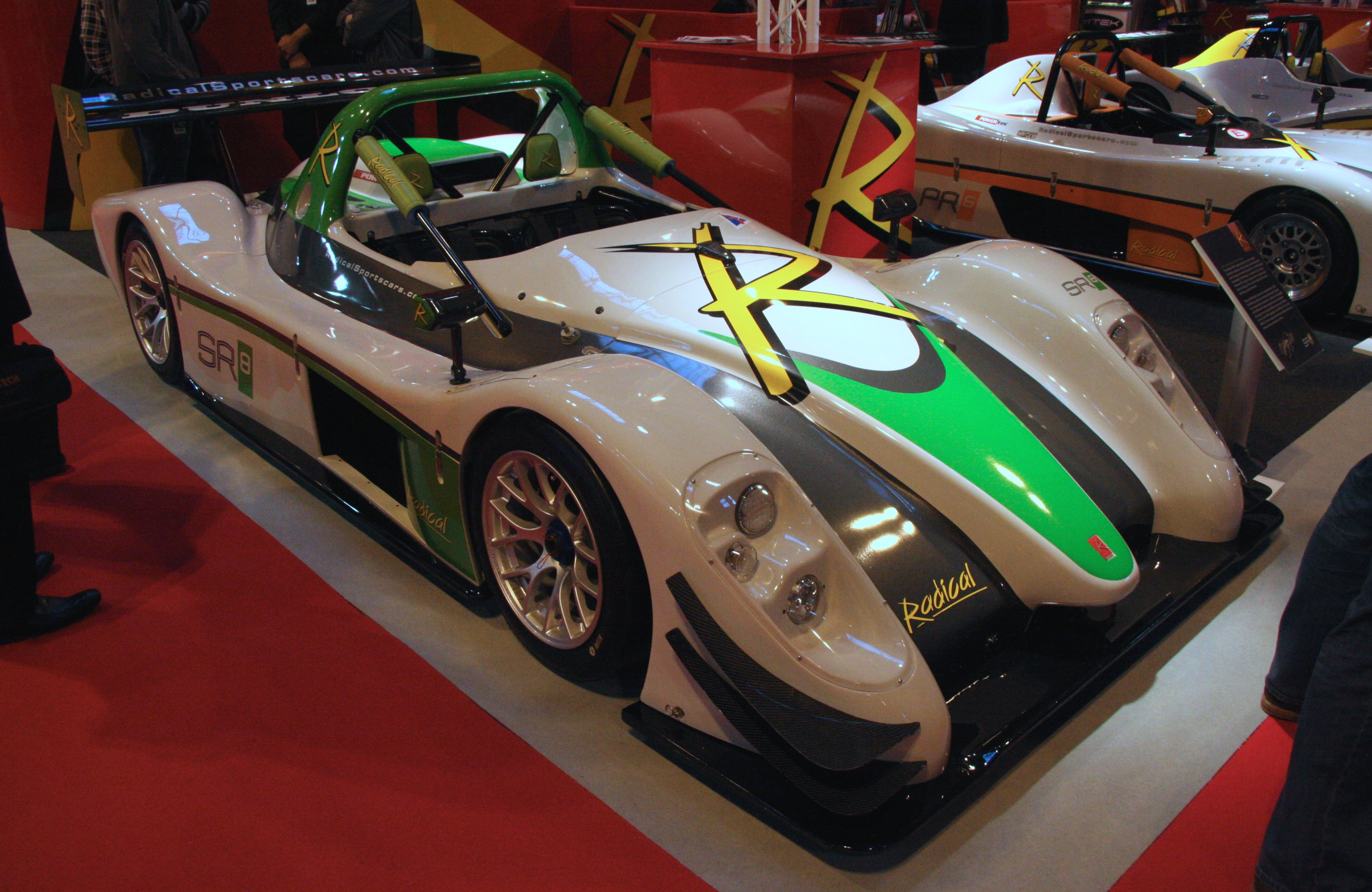
The Radical SR8 achieved record in 2009 for the fastest road-legal car with a time of 6:48

== Track lengths and timing ==
There are varying lap lengths. Therefore, not all of the lap times are comparable.

=== Full lap ===
A full lap of the Nordschleife, bypassing the modern GP track, is 20,832 m (12.944 mi) long. Most laps are completed about 200 metres (656 ft) shorter for safety reasons, such as tests performed by Sport Auto, which uses the 20,600 m configuration. Full uninterrupted flying laps can only be done in closed sessions and race events like Castrol-Haugg-Cup.

=== Bridge to gantry ===
During tourist driving sessions, the full main straight cannot be driven at speed due to the exit/entrance. These laps are usually timed "bridge to gantry", which is only 19.1 km (11.9 mi). The lap goes from the "bridge" at Antoniusbuche to the "gantry" (currently carrying Audi sponsorship) on Döttinger Höhe.

== Lap times ==
=== Automobiles ===
==== Production/street-legal ====
A production vehicle is defined as "one that is put into mass production, as a model produced in large numbers and offered for sale to the public". VCA, the United Kingdom's national approval authority for new road vehicles defines a production vehicle as "a vehicle of a make, model and type mass-produced by the vehicle manufacturer". Guinness World Records was reported to require a minimum of 30 and other lists within Wikipedia require at least 25 road legal cars built. The Nürburgring is a public (toll-) road, and regulations of Germany and the EU apply. For the purpose of this list, a car is "street legal" if it is registered in at least one EU country for road use.

For new entries, this list requires an official manufacturer's press release for manufacturer-conducted tests. If the test has been conducted by an independent publication, an article in that publication is required. New entries require an original, uncut on-board video, showing the lap and the timing from start to finish. A statement that road legal OEM tyres have been used is required.

Length (Note: 20,600 m (12.8 mi) unless otherwise specified)	Time	Vehicle	Driver	Date	Notes
20,832 m	6:29.090	Mercedes-AMG One	Maro Engel	2024-09-23	Official Nürburgring record attempt by Mercedes-AMG. Timing and vehicle condition verified by a notary. Michelin Pilot Sport Cup 2 R tyres. 6:24.03 on 20.6 km lap.
20,832 m	6:43.300	Porsche 911 GT2 RS Manthey Performance Kit (991.2)	Lars Kern	2021-06-14	Official Nürburgring record attempt by Porsche. Timing and vehicle condition verified by a notary. Michelin Pilot Sport Cup 2 R tyres, OEM Manthey Performance Kit. 6:38.835 on the 20,600 m lap.
20,832 m	6:45.389	Porsche 911 GT3 RS Manthey Kit (992.1)	Jörg Bergmeister	2025-04-14	Official Nürburgring record attempt by Porsche. Timing and vehicle condition verified by a notary. Michelin Pilot Sport Cup 2 R tyres, OEM Manthey Kit.
20,832 m	6:48.047	Mercedes-AMG GT Black Series	Maro Engel	2020-11-04	Official Nürburgring record attempt by Mercedes. Timing and vehicle condition verified by a notary. OEM Michelin Pilot Sport Cup 2 R MO tyres. 6:43.616 on the 20,600 lap.
20,832 m	6:49.275	Chevrolet Corvette ZR1X	Drew Cattell	2025-06	General Motors conducted test, Carbon Fiber wheels with Michelin Cup 2R summer-only tires. US production spec but officially classified as Prototype/Pre-Production because ZR1X is not sold in Europe.
20,832 m	6:49.328	Porsche 911 GT3 RS (992.1)	Jörg Bergmeister	2022-10-05	Porsche conducted test, full roll cage, Michelin Pilot Sport Cup 2 R tyres. 6:44.848 on the 20,600 m lap. Timing and vehicle condition verified by a notary.
20,832 m	6:49.42	Lamborghini Aventador SVJ LP770-4 (2018)	Marco Mapelli	2018-07-26	Lamborghini conducted test, full roll cage, Pirelli P Zero Trofeo R. 6:44.97 on the 20,600 m lap.
20,832 m	6:50.763	Chevrolet Corvette ZR1	Brian Wallace	2025-06	General Motors conducted test, Carbon Fiber wheels with Michelin Cup 2R summer-only tires.US production spec but officially classified as Prototype/Pre-Production because ZR1 is not sold in Europe.
20,832 m	6:51.45	Porsche 911 GT2 RS (991.2)	Lars Kern	2017-09-20	Porsche conducted test. OEM Michelin Pilot Sport Cup 2 'N2', OEM "Weissach Package", OEM deletion of audio and communication system, Porsche Motorsport bucket seat and harness on driver's side. 6:47.25 on the 20,600 m lap.
20,832 m	6:52.072	Ford Mustang GTD	Dirk Müller	2025-05-01	Full 20,832 m lap. 6:47.26 on the 20,600 m lap. Ford conducted test. Michelin Pilot Sport Cup 2 R tires.
20,832 m	6:52.70	Radical SR8 LM	Michael Vergers	2009-08-19	Dunlop Direzza DZ03 tyres. Production car status disputed, road legal version is available with British Single Vehicle Approval. Timed by Sport Auto. 6:48.28 on the 20,600 m lap.
20,832 m	6:55.533	Porsche Taycan Turbo GT Manthey Kit	Lars Kern	2026-04-15	Porsche conducted test. Fastest road legal four door on the Nürburgring
20,832 m	6:56.45	Lamborghini Huracán Performante LP640-4 (2017)	Marco Mapelli	2016-10-05	Lamborghini conducted test, full roll cage, Pirelli Trofeo R. 6:52.01 on the 20,600 m lap.
20,600 m	6:52.54	Mercedes-AMG GT Black Series	Christian Gebhardt	2021-07-07	Sport Auto (08/2021), Michelin Pilot Sport Cup 2 R MO1A.
20,832 m	6:57.685	Ford Mustang GTD	Dirk Müller	2024-08-07	Ford conducted test. Full 20,832 m lap. 6:53.26 on 20,600 m lap. Michelin Pilot Sport Cup 2 R tires.
20,600 m	6:54.99	Porsche 911 GT3 RS (992.1)	Christian Gebhardt	2022-10-19	Sport Auto (06/2023), Michelin Pilot Sport Cup 2 R.
20,600 m	6:55	Radical SR8	Michael Vergers	2005-09-28	Dunlop Direzza DZ03 tyres. Track car, road legal version is available with British Single Vehicle Approval. Timed by Sport Auto.
20,600 m	6:56.4	Porsche 911 GT3 RS (991.2)	Kévin Estre	2018-04-16	Porsche conducted test. OEM Michelin Pilot Sport Cup 2 R 'N0', OEM "Weissach Package", OEM deletion of audio and communication system, Porsche Motorsport bucket seat and harness on driver's side, witnessed by instructor and influencer Misha Charoudin.
20,600 m	6:57	Porsche 918 Spyder	Marc Lieb	2013-09-04	Porsche conducted test, observed by Sport Auto. "Weissach Package", Michelin Pilot Sport Cup 2 'N0'.
20,600 m	6:58.28	Porsche 911 GT2 RS (991.2, 2018, 3.8 TT, 700 PS)	Christian Gebhardt	2018-04-17	Sport Auto (07/2018), Michelin Pilot Sport Cup 2 R.
20,600 m	6:58.70	Ferrari 296 GTB	Christian Gebhardt	2023-06-07	Sport Auto (07/2023), Assetto Fiorano Paket, Michelin Pilot Sport Cup 2 R.
20,832 m	6:59.157	YANGWANG U9 Xtreme	Moritz Kranz	2025-08-22	Yangwang conducted test. GitiSport e·GTR² PRO semi-slick tires. Peak speed 350 km/h.
20,600 m	6:59.42	Porsche 911 GT3 Manthey Performance Kit (992.1, 2023, N/A 4.0, 510 PS)	Christian Gebhardt	2023-02-08	Sport Auto (03/2023), Michelin Pilot Sport Cup 2 R.
	6:59.73	Lamborghini Aventador SuperVeloce LP750-4 (2015)	Marco Mapelli	2015-05-18	Lamborghini conducted test, full roll cage, Pirelli P Zero Corsa.
20,832 m	6:59.927	Porsche 911 GT3 (992.1, 2022)	Lars Kern	2020-09-15	Porsche conducted test. Michelin Pilot Sport Cup 2 R. 6:55.34 on the 20,600 m lap.
20,832 m	7:03.121	Porsche Cayman GT4 RS Manthey Performance Kit (982)	Jörg Bergmeister	2023-07-13	Porsche conducted test. OEM Michelin Pilot Sport Cup 2 R, OEM "Manthey Performance Kit". Ambient temperature of 18 °C (64 °F). The lap time was certified by a notary. 6:58.092 on the 20,600 m lap.
20,600 m	7:00.03	Ferrari 488 Pista	Christian Gebhardt	2019-05-16	Sport Auto (11/2019), Michelin Pilot Sport Cup 2 R K1.
20,600 m	7:01.3	Dodge Viper ACR (2017)	Lance David Arnold	2017-09-01	OEM "GTS-R Commemorative Edition", "Extreme Aero Package", Kumho Ecsta V720 ACR. Privately funded and observed by Road & Track. Third attempt, testing ended by tyre failure resulting in crash.
20,832 m	7:03.92	Porsche 911 Turbo S (992.2)	Jörg Bergmeister	2024-09-11	Officially confirmed under notarial supervision.
	7:04.632	Mercedes-AMG GT R Pro	Maro Engel	2018-11	Mercedes-Benz conducted test (11/2018). Michelin Pilot Sport Cup 2 ZP. Ambient temperature of 12 °C (54 °F). Vehicle in accordance with regulations. Timed by wige SolutionS.
20,600 m	7:04.74	Porsche 911 GT3 (992.1, pre-facelift, 2021, N/A 4.0, 510 PS)	Christian Gebhardt	2021-05-05	Sport Auto (06/2021), Michelin Pilot Sport Cup 2 R.
20,832 m	7:04.957	Xiaomi SU7 Ultra with Track Package	Vincent Radermecker	2025-04-01	Xiaomi conducted test. Peak speed 346 km/h. Second fastest road legal four door on the Nürburgring
20,832 m	7:05.298	Rimac Nevera	Martin Kodrić	2023-08-18	Official Nürburgring record attempt by Rimac. Michelin Cup 2 R. Independent timing and series-production state verified by TÜV SÜD. 7:00.928 on the 20,600 m lap.
20,600 m	7:05.41	Porsche 911 GT3 RS (991.2, facelift, 2018, N/A 4.0, 520 PS)	Christian Gebhardt	2018-04-18	Sport Auto (09/2018), OEM deletion of audio and communication system, Porsche Motorsport bucket seat and harness on driver's side.
20,600 m	7:06.60	Mercedes-AMG GT R Pro	Christian Gebhardt	2019-05-22	Sport Auto (08/2019), Michelin Pilot Sport Cup 2 ZP.
20,832 m	7:07.55	Porsche Taycan Turbo GT	Lars Kern	2024-01-02	Porsche conducted test. Weissach package.
20,600 m	7:07.99	Lamborghini Huracán Performante LP640-4 (2018, N/A 5.2, 640 PS)	Christian Gebhardt	2018-11-09	Sport Auto (12/2018), Pirelli P Zero Trofeo R.
20,600 m	7:08.34	McLaren 720S	Christian Gebhardt	2018-06-28	Sport Auto (02/2019), Pirelli P Zero Corsa.
20,600 m	7:08.82	McLaren 600LT	Christian Gebhardt	2019-06-06	Sport Auto (09/2019), Pirelli P Zero Trofeo R MC.
20,832 m	7:09.300	Porsche Cayman GT4 RS (982)	Jörg Bergmeister	2021-09-17	Porsche conducted test. OEM Michelin Pilot Sport Cup 2 R, OEM deletion of audio and communication system, bucket seat and harness on driver's side. 7:04.511 on the 20,600 m lap.
20,600 m	7:10.52	C8 Corvette Z06 (2024)	Christian Gebhardt	2024-12-11	Tested in Sport Auto (11/2024), Michelin Pilot Sport Cup 2 R.
20,600 m	7:10.92	Mercedes-AMG GT R (2017)	Christian Gebhardt	2016-11-04	Observed in Sport Auto (01/2017), tested in Sport Auto (05/2017), Michelin Pilot Sport Cup 2 'ZP'.
	7:11.57	Gumpert Apollo Sport	Florian Gruber	2009-08-13	Observed by Sport Auto, Michelin Pilot Sport Cup.
20,832 m	7:11.826	Chevrolet Corvette Z06 (2025)	Aaron Link	2025-06	General Motors conducted test, Carbon Fiber wheels with Michelin Cup 2R summer-only tires.Officially classified as Prototype/Pre-Production due to US production specification used
	7:12.13	Dodge Viper ACR (2010)	Dominik Farnbacher	2011-09-14	SRT, Viper Club of America and ViperExchange conducted test. Michelin Pilot Sport Cup.
20,600 m	7:12.69	Porsche Carrera GT (980)	Jörg Bergmeister	2024-12-12	sport auto (12/12)
	7:12.7	Porsche 911 GT3 (991.2)	Lars Kern	2017-05-04	Porsche conducted test. Michelin Pilot Sport Cup 2, PDK, carbon ceramic brakes, OEM deletion of audio and communication system, "Clubsport Package", Porsche Motorsport bucket seat and harness on driver's side.
20,600 m	7:13	Porsche 918 Spyder	Horst von Saurma	2014-06	Sport Auto (06/2014), Michelin Pilot Sport Cup 2.
	7:13.497	BMW M4 CSL (G82, 2023, 3.0 TT, 550 PS)	Jörg Weidinger	2023-09-01	BMW conducted test, updated second chance lap record for BMW M4 CSL. 7:18.137 on 20.832 m configuration of track. Michelin Pilot Sport Cup 2 R.
20,600 m	7:13.90	Chevrolet Corvette Z06 (C7)	Christian Gebhardt	2017-04-24	Sport Auto (08/2017), Michelin Pilot Sport Cup 2 'ZP', manual.
	7:14.64	Lexus LFA Nürburgring Package	Akira Iida	2011-08-31	Lexus conducted test. OEM "Nürburgring Package", Bridgestone Potenza RE070, additional roll cage.
	7:14.89	Donkervoort D8 RS	Michael Düchting	2006	Observed by Sport Auto, Dunlop Sportmaxx.
	7:15	Lamborghini Aventador SuperVeloce LP750-4 (2015)	Horst von Saurma	2015-02	Autozeitung Sport & Luxury Cars (04/2015), Pirelli P Zero Corsa.
	7:15.677	BMW M4 CSL (G82, 2022)	Jörg Weidinger	2022-04-12	Fastest lap time ever for a series-produced BMW car. 7:20.207 on the 20,832 m lap.
	7:16.04	Chevrolet Camaro ZL1 1LE (2018)	Bill Wise	2017	General Motors conducted test, OEM Goodyear Eagle F1 Supercar 3R.
20,600 m	7:16.15	Porsche Cayman GT4 RS (718, 2022, N/A 4.0, 500 PS)	Christian Gebhardt	2022-05-09	Sport Auto (06/2022), Michelin Pilot Sport Cup 2 R.
20,600 m	7:17.08	BMW M4 CSL (G82, 2022)	Christian Gebhardt	2022-10-12	Sport Auto (04/2023), Michelin Pilot Sport Cup 2 R.
20,600 m	7:17.11	Porsche 911 Turbo S (991.2, facelift, 2018, 3.8 TT, 580 PS)	Christian Gebhardt	2017-08-24	Sport Auto (03/2018), Pirelli P Zero Corsa 'N1', OEM 'Aerokit'.
	7:17.215	BMW M4 CS (G82, 2024, 3.0 TT, 550 PS)	Jörg Weidinger	2024-05-08	BMW conducted test, 7:21.989 on 20.832 m configuration of track. Michelin Pilot Sport Cup 2R.
20,600 m	7:17.3	Porsche 911 Turbo S (992.1, pre-facelift, 2021, 3.7 TT, 650 PS)	Christian Gebhardt	2021-01-30	Sport Auto (02/2021), Pirelli P Zero 'NA1'.
	7:18	Porsche 911 GT2 RS (997.2)	Timo Glock	2010	Porsche conducted test, Michelin Pilot Sport Cup 'N2'.
20,600 m	7:18	Porsche 911 GT3 (991.2, facelift, 2017, N/A 4.0, 500 PS)	Christian Gebhardt	2017-04-28	Sport Auto (7/2017), Michelin Pilot Sport Cup 2 'N1', PDK, bucket seat and harness.
	7:18.1	Donkervoort D8 RS	Michael Düchting	2004-10-24	Observed by Sport Auto.
	7:19.1	Nissan GT-R (2013)		2012	Nissan conducted test.
	7:19.63	Chevrolet Corvette C6 ZR1 (2012)	Jim Mero	2011-06-09	General Motors conducted test. Base car, OEM Michelin Pilot Sport Cup ZP option.
	7:20.890	BMW M2 CS	Jörg Weidinger	2025-04-11	Official Nürburgring record attempt by BMW. Timing and vehicle condition verified by a notary, 7:25.534 on 20.832 m configuration of track. Lap record for compact cars. Pirelli P Zero Trofeo RS.
	7:21	Ferrari 488 GTB	Horst von Saurma	2016-08	Autozeitung Sport & Luxury Cars (19/2016), Michelin Pilot Sport Cup 2 K1.
20,600 m	7:21.63	Ferrari 488 GTB	Christian Gebhardt	2016-11	Sport Auto (12/2016), Michelin Pilot Sport Cup 2.
	7:22.1	Dodge Viper ACR (2009)	Tom Coronel	2008-08-18	Chrysler and Motor Trend conducted test. Michelin Pilot Sport Cup.
	7:22.68	Chevrolet Corvette C6 Z06 (2012)	Jim Mero	2011-06-23	General Motors conducted test. Z07 package, OEM Michelin Pilot Sport Cup ZP option.
20,832 m	7:22.755	Xiaomi YU7 GT with Track Package	Vincent Radermecker	2026-04-02	Xiaomi conducted test. Fastest SUV on the Nürburgring.
	7:23.009	Mercedes-AMG GT 63 S 4MATIC+ (X290, 2021)	Demian Schaffert	2020-11-10	Mercedes-Benz conducted test, Michelin Pilot Sport Cup 2 tires and AMG Aerodynamics Package. Timed by wige Solutions. 7:27.800 on the 20,832 m lap.
20,832 m	7:23.164	Jaguar XE SV Project 8 (2018)	Vincent Radermecker	2019-07	Jaguar conducted test, Michelin Pilot Sport Cup 2 R tyres, two-seat Track Package.
20,600 m	7:23.77	Porsche 911 Carrera GTS (991.2)	Christian Gebhardt	2017-05	Sport Auto (06/2017), optional OEM Pirelli P Zero Corsa N0, PDK, rear seats.
	7:23.975	BMW M3 CS (G80, 2023, 3.0 TT, 550 PS)	Jörg Weidinger	2023-08-31	BMW conducted test, 7:28.760 on 20.832 m configuration of track. Michelin Pilot Sport Cup 2.
20,600 m	7:24	Gumpert Apollo Sport	Horst von Saurma	2010-11	Sport Auto (11/2009), Michelin Pilot Sport Cup.
20,600 m	7:24	Porsche 911 GT2 RS (997.2)	Horst von Saurma	2010	Sport Auto (11/2010), Michelin Pilot Sport Cup.
20,832 m	7:24.172	Porsche Panamera Turbo S E-Hybrid (976, 2024)	Lars Kern	2024-07-12	Porsche Conducted Test. Michelin Pilot Sport Cup 2 tires.
	7:24.22	Nissan GT-R (2011)	Toshio Suzuki	2010-10-01	Nissan conducted test. Video confirmed. Done on semi-wet (damp) condition. Best Motoring (12/2010).
	7:24.29	Maserati MC12	Marc Basseng	2008-08	Evo Magazine conducted test, Evo Magazine, #123 (11/2008).
	7:24.44	Pagani Zonda F Clubsport	Marc Basseng	2008-08	Evo Magazine conducted test, Evo Magazine, #123 (11/2008).
20,600 m	7:25	Lamborghini Aventador LP700-4	Horst von Saurma	2012	Sport Auto (08/2012), Pirelli P Zero Corsa.
	7:25.21	Ferrari Enzo	Marc Basseng	2008-08	Evo Magazine conducted test, Evo Magazine, #123 (11/2008).
	7:25.41	Mercedes-AMG GT 63 S 4MATIC+ (X290, 2018)	Demian Schaffert	2018-10-15	Mercedes-AMG conducted test. 7:30.11 on the 20,832 m lap.
	7:25.67	Mercedes-Benz SLS AMG Black Series	Markus Hofbauer	2013-08	Mercedes-AMG conducted test.
	7:25.72	KTM X-Bow RR	Christopher Haase	2012	KTM conducted test, Michelin Pilot Sport Cup.
	7:26.4	Chevrolet Corvette C6 ZR1 (2009)	Jim Mero	2008-06-27	General Motors conducted test, Michelin Pilot Sport 2.
	7:26.70	Nissan GT-R (2009)	Toshio Suzuki	2009-04-23	Nissan Motors conducted test, optional tyres. Best Motoring (08/2009).
20,600 m	7:27.48	Ferrari 812 Superfast	Christian Gebhardt	2018-06-20	Sport Auto (03/2019), Pirelli P Zero Corsa.
	7:27.82	Pagani Zonda F Clubsport (2005)	Marc Basseng	2007-09	Pagani conducted test.
	7:27.88	BMW M4 GTS (F82, 2015)	Jörg Weidinger	2015-09	Michelin Pilot Sport Cup 2.
20,600 m	7:28	Porsche 911 GT3 RS (991.1, pre-facelift, 2015, N/A 4.0, 500 PS)	Christian Gebhardt	2015	Sport Auto (08/2015), Michelin Pilot Sport Cup 2.
	7:28.0	Porsche Carrera GT (980)	Walter Röhrl	2004-07-02	Auto Bild (07/04)
20,600 m	7:28.0	McLaren MP4-12C	Horst von Saurma	2011	Sport Auto (11/2011), Pirelli P Zero Corsa.
20,600 m	7:28.0	Lamborghini Huracán LP610-4	Christian Gebhardt	2016-07	Sport Auto (08/2016), Pirelli P Zero Trofeo R.
20,600 m	7:28.02	Mercedes-AMG GT 63 S E-Performance (X290, pre-facelift, 2022, 4.0 TT + 1E-motor, 843 PS)	Christian Gebhardt	2022-09	Sport Auto (09/2022), Michelin Pilot Sport Cup 2 MO1.
20,600 m	7:28.57	BMW M4 Competition xDrive (G82, 2022, 3.0 TT, 510 PS)	Christian Gebhardt	2021-09-22	Sport Auto (05/2022), Michelin Pilot Sport Cup 2.
	7:28.71	Porsche Carrera GT (980)	Marc Basseng	2008-08	Evo Magazine conducted test, Evo Magazine, #123 (11/2008).
	7:29.03	Nissan GT-R (2009)	Toshio Suzuki	2008-04-17	Nissan Motors conducted test.
20,600 m	7:29.57	BMW M5 CS (F90, 2021)	Christian Gebhardt	2021-06-02	Sport Auto (07/2021), Pirelli P Zero Corsa.
	7:29.60	Chevrolet Camaro ZL1 (2017)	Drew Cattell	2016-10-24	Goodyear Eagle F1.
20,832 m	7:29.81	Porsche Panamera Turbo S (971.2, 2020)	Lars Kern	2020-07-24	Porsche Conducted Test. Michelin Pilot Sport Cup 2 tires. Lap record for a production executive car.
	7:29.90	Chevrolet Corvette (C8) (2020)	Oliver Gavin	2019-07	General Motors conducted test. Z51 performance package
	7:30.0	Mercedes-Benz SLS AMG GT (2012)		2012	According to AMG chairman Ola Källenius, as reported by Auto Blog. No video or press release.
20,600 m	7:30	Porsche 911 GT3 RS 4.0 (997.2, facelift, 2011, N/A 4.0, 500 PS)	Horst von Saurma	2011	Sport Auto (08/2011), Michelin Pilot Sport Cup N1.
20,600 m	7:30.41	Porsche 911 Carrera S (992)	Christian Gebhardt	2019	Sport Auto (10/2019), Pirelli P Zero NA1, Porsche Motorsport bucket seat and harness on driver's side.
20,600 m	7:30.79	BMW M4 Competition (G82, 2021, 3.0 TT, 510 PS)	Christian Gebhardt	2021-04-15	Sport Auto (09/2021), Michelin Pilot Sport Cup 2.
	7:31	Porsche 911 GT2 (997, 2007)	Walter Röhrl	2007	Porsche conducted test.
20,600 m	7:32	Porsche 911 GT3 (991.1, pre-facelift, 2013, N/A 3.8, 475 PS)	Horst von Saurma	2013-11	Sport Auto (11/2013), Michelin Pilot Sport Cup 2, PDK automatic.
	7:32	Alfa Romeo Giulia Quadrifoglio (2015)	Fabio Francia	2016-09	Alfa Romeo Giulia Quadrifoglio with automatic transmission
20,600 m	7:32	Audi R8 V10 Plus (4S, 2015)	Christian Gebhardt	2015	Sport Auto (10/2015), Michelin Pilot Sport Cup 2.
20,600 m	7:32	Porsche Cayman GT4 (718, 2020, N/A 4.0, 420 PS)	Christian Gebhardt	2020	Sport Auto (05/2020), Michelin Pilot Sport Cup 2 N1.
20,600 m	7:32.40	Porsche Carrera GT (980)	Horst von Saurma	2003	Sport Auto (01/2004), Michelin Pilot Sport. Wet patches on the track.
20,600 m	7:32.79	BMW M8 Coupe Competition (F92, 2020, 625 PS)	Christian Gebhardt	2020-06-09	Sport Auto (07/2020), Pirelli P Zero.
20,832 m	7:32.92	Ferrari 458 Italia (570 PS, 2010)	Sascha Bert	2010-10	Auto Bild Sportscars (11/2010), Michelin Pilot Sport PS2 K1.
20,600 m	7:33	Ferrari F12 Berlinetta (740 PS, 2014)	Horst von Saurma	2014-09	Sport Auto (09/2014), Michelin Pilot Sport Cup 2.
20,600 m	7:33	Pagani Zonda F	Horst von Saurma	2006	Sport Auto (05/2006), Michelin Pilot Sport 2 N0/1.
20,600 m	7:33	Porsche 911 GT3 RS (997.2, 2010)	Horst von Saurma	2010	Sport Auto (05/2010), PCCB
20,600 m	7:33	Porsche 911 GT2 (997.1, pre-facelift, 2007, 3.6 TT, 530 PS)	Horst von Saurma	2007	Sport Auto (11/2007), Michelin Pilot Sport Cup.
20,832 m	7:33.35	Porsche Taycan Turbo S (2023)	Lars Kern	2022-04-11	Porsche conducted test. Equipped with Tequipment performance kit and PDCC. Pirelli P Zero Corsa tyres. Added roll cage and racing seats.
	7:33.55	Koenigsegg CCX	Marc Basseng	2008-08	Evo Magazine conducted test, Evo Magazine, #123 (11/2008).
20,600 m	7:33.67	Porsche 911 Carrera S (991.2)	Christian Gebhardt	2016-05	Sport Auto (06/2016), Pirelli P Zero N1.
	7:33.906	BMW M2 (G87, 2023, 3.0 TT, 460 PS)	Jörg Weidinger	2023-08-30	BMW conducted test, 7:38.706 on 20.832 m configuration of track. Michelin Pilot Sport Cup 2.
	7:33.95	Porsche Cayenne Turbo GT (Mk3, PO536 / 9YA, pre-facelift, 2021, 4.0 TT, 640 PS)	Lars Kern	2021-06-14	Official Nürburgring record attempt by Porsche. Timing and vehicle condition verified by a notary. Pirelli P Zero Corsa. Set a SUV record. 7:38.925 on the 20,832 m lap.
20,600 m	7:34	Audi R8 GT (Mk1, Typ 42, 2010)	Horst von Saurma	2010-12	Sport Auto (12/2010), Pirelli P Zero Corsa R02.
20,600 m	7:34	Koenigsegg CCR	Horst von Saurma	2005-10-17	Sport Auto (03/2006), Michelin Pilot Sport N0.
20,600 m	7:34	Nissan GT-R (2011)	Horst von Saurma	2010-10	Sport Auto (11/2010), Dunlop SP Sport Maxx GT 600 DSST.
20,600 m	7:34	Lexus LFA Nürburgring Package	Horst von Saurma	2012-02	Sport Auto (02/2012), Bridgestone Potenza RE070.
20,600 m	7:34	Porsche 911 Turbo S (991.1, pre-facelift, 2014, 3.8 TT, 560 PS)	Horst von Saurma	2014-02	Sport Auto (02/2014), Dunlop SportMaxx Race.
20,600 m	7:34.39	BMW M3 Competition Touring (G81, 2023, 3.0 TT, 510 PS)	Christian Gebhardt	2023-10-19	Sport Auto (11/2023), Michelin Pilot Sport Cup 2*.
	7:34.46	Nissan GT-R Spec-V		2009	Best Motoring - Time Attack.
20,832 m	7:34.92	Porsche 911 GT3 RS 4.0 (997)	Sascha Bert	2011-09	Auto Bild Sportscars (09/2011)
20,832 m	7:34.931	Xiaomi YU7 GT with Track Package	Ren Zhoucan	2026-04-02	Xiaomi conducted test. Peak speed 299 km/h. Fastest SUV on the Nürburgring.
20,600 m	7:35	McLaren 650S Spider	Horst von Saurma	2015	Sport Auto (03/2015), Pirelli P Zero Corsa.
	7:35	Mercedes-AMG GT S (pre-facelift, 2015, 510 PS)	Horst von Saurma	2015	Autozeitung Sport & Luxury Cars (01/2015), Michelin Pilot Sport Cup 2.
20,600 m	7:35	Mercedes-Benz SLS AMG Black Series	Horst von Saurma	2013	Sport Auto (12/2013), Michelin Pilot Sport Cup 2.
20,600 m	7:35	Ruf Rt 12	Horst von Saurma	2008	Sport Auto (02/2008), Michelin Pilot Sport Cup.
20,832 m	7:35:060	BMW M3 Touring	Jörg Weidinger	2022-05-12	Record for the fastest lap for a wagon.Official Nürburgring record attempt by BMW.
20,600 m	7:35.42	Hyundai Ioniq 6 N	Christian Gebhardt	2026-03-23	Sport Auto (06/2026), Pirelli P Zero Trofeo RS. 10 seconds faster than the Hyundai Ioniq 5 N.
	7:35.522	Audi RS3 (Typ 8Y, 2021, 2.5 T, 400 PS)	Frank Stippler	2021-06-14	Official Nürburgring record attempt by Audi. Timing and vehicle condition verified by a notary. Pirelli P Zero Trofeo R. 7:40.748 on the 20,832 m lap. Lap record for compact cars.
20,832 m	7:35.579	Tesla Model S Plaid	Andreas Simonsen	2021-09-09	Michelin 295/30ZR21. 7:30.909 on the 20,600 m lap.
20,600 m	7:35.90	BMW M5 Competition (F90, 2019, 625 PS)	Christian Gebhardt	2019-04-17	Sport Auto (07/2019), Pirelli P Zero.
20,600 m	7:36	Honda NSX (NC1, 2016)	Christian Gebhardt	2017-03	Sport Auto (02/2017), Pirelli P Zero Trofeo R.
20,600 m	7:36	Mercedes-AMG GT S (pre-facelift, 2016, 510 PS)	Christian Gebhardt	2016	Sport Auto (11/2016), Michelin Pilot Sport Cup 2.
20,600 m	7:36	Nissan GT-R (R35)	Horst von Saurma	2011	Sport Auto (05/2011), Dunlop SP Sport Maxx GT 600 DSST.
	7:36.698	Audi RS Q8 Performance			
20,600 m	7:37	BMW M4 GTS (F82, 2016)	Christian Gebhardt	2016-10	Sport Auto (09/2016), Michelin Pilot Sport Cup 2.
	7:37.4	Chevrolet Camaro Z/28 (2014)	Adam Dean	2013-10	General Motors conducted test, Pirelli P Zero Trofeo R.
20,600 m	7:37.66	Audi RS3 (Typ 8Y, 2022, 2.5 T, 400 PS)	Christian Gebhardt	2022	Sport Auto (08/2022), Pirelli P Zero Trofeo R Audi AO.
	7:37.9	Porsche 911 Carrera S (991.1, pre-facelift, 2012, N/A 3.8, 400 PS)	Timo Glock	2012-08-28	Porsche conducted test, PDK transmission.
20,600 m	7:38	Ferrari 458 Italia	Horst von Saurma	2010	Sport Auto (08/2010), Michelin Pilot Sport PS2.
20,600 m	7:38	Lexus LFA	Horst von Saurma	2010-09	Sport Auto (09/2010), Bridgestone Potenza S001.
	7:38	Porsche 911 Turbo (997.1, pre-facelift, 2008, 3.6 TT, 480 PS)		2008-09	Porsche conducted test.
20,600 m	7:38	Chevrolet Corvette C6 ZR1	Horst von Saurma	2009-10	Sport Auto conducted test, Michelin Pilot Sport ZP run-flat.
20,600 m	7:38	Nissan GT-R	Horst von Saurma	2009	Sport Auto (07/2009), Dunlop SP Sport 600 DSST run flat.
20,600 m	7:38	Lamborghini Gallardo Superleggera LP570-4	Horst von Saurma	2011	Sport Auto (04/2011), Pirelli P Zero Corsa.
	7:38	Porsche Panamera Turbo (971, 2017, 4.0 TT, 550 PS)		2016	Car equipped with roll cage. Confirmed by Road & Track
20,832 m	7:38.85	Lexus LFA	Sascha Bert	2010-11	Auto Bild Sportscars (11/2010), supercomparo (LFA vs 458 vs SLS AMG vs GT-R vs LP570-4 vs Weismann GT) test conducted on the long 20.8 km configuration of Nurburgring, Bridgestone EM 98 (11/2010).
20,600 m	7:38.92	BMW M5 (F90)	Christian Gebhardt	2018-04-12	Sport Auto (06/2018), Pirelli P Zero.
	7:38.925	Porsche Cayenne Turbo GT			
20,600 m	7:39	Ferrari F430 Scuderia	Horst von Saurma	2008	Sport Auto (07/2008), Pirelli P Zero Corsa.
20,600 m	7:39.35	Audi RS4 Avant Competition Plus (B9)	Christian Gebhardt	2023-07-12	Sport Auto (08/2023), Pirelli P Zero Corsa AO.
20,600 m	7:39.40	Porsche 911 Dakar (992, 2023, 3.0 TT, 480 PS)	Christian Gebhardt	2023-08-14	Sport Auto (09/2023), Pirelli Scorpion All Terrain. Shortened 3 off-road turns.
20,832 m	7:39.49	Porsche Carrera GT (2006, 612 PS)	Walter Röhrl	2006-03	Auto Bild Sportscars (03/2006), 6-speed manual transmission.
	7:39.691	Honda Civic Type R S grade (FL5 available in select European countries)	Néstor Girolami	2023-03-24	Honda conducted test, non-factory optioned aftermarket Michelin Pilot Sport Cup 2 Connect. Current FWD car record holder. 7:44.881 on the 20,832 m lap.
20,832 m	7:40	Bugatti Veyron 16.4		2005	Wheels Magazine Australia 2005
	7:40	Lamborghini Murciélago LP640	Giorgio Sanna	2007	Official Lamborghini lap time according to Auto Bild Sportscars (01/2007), Pirelli P Zero Corsa.
	7:40	Mercedes-Benz SLR McLaren	Klaus Ludwig	2004	Auto Bild (07/2004)
20,600 m	7:40	Porsche 911 GT3 (997.2)	Horst von Saurma	2009	Sport Auto (06/2009), Michelin Pilot Sport Cup.
20,600 m	7:40	Mercedes-Benz SLS AMG	Horst von Saurma	2010	Sport Auto (05/2010), Continental ContiSportContact 5.
	7:40.100	Renault Mégane IV R.S. Trophy-R	Laurent Hurgon	2019-04-05	Renault Sport conducted test, Bridgestone Potenza S007. 7:45.389 on the 20,832 m lap. FWD car record holder (before 2023 Civic Type R).
20,832 m	7:40.76	Lamborghini Gallardo Superleggera LP570-4	Sascha Bert	2010-11	Auto Bild Sportscars (11/2010), Pirelli P Zero Corsa.
20,832 m	7:40.89	Audi R8 GT (Mk1, Typ 42, 2010)	Sascha Bert	2011-09	Auto Bild Sportscars (09/2011)
20,832 m	7:41.23	Porsche 911 Turbo S (997.2, facelift, 2010, 3.8 TT, 530 PS)	Sascha Bert	2010-11	Auto Bild Sportscars (11/2010), Bridgestone Potenza RE 050.
	7:41.27	Chevrolet Camaro ZL1 (2012)	Aaron Link	2011-10	General Motors conducted test.
20,832 m	7:41.50	Chevrolet Corvette C6 ZR1	Sascha Bert	2009-08	Auto Bild Sportscars (08/2009)
	7:42	BMW M4 CS (F82, 2017, 3.0 TT, 460 PS)	Christian Gebhardt	2017	Sport Auto (11/2017), Michelin Pilot Sport Cup 2.
	7:42	Porsche 911 GT3 (997.1, pre-facelift, N/A 3.6, 415 PS)	Walter Röhrl	2006	Automobile (05/2006), Sport Auto (05/2006)
20,600 m	7:42	Lamborghini Murciélago SuperVeloce LP670-4	Horst von Saurma	2010	Sport Auto (01/2010), Pirelli P Zero Corsa.
20,832 m	7:42.253	Audi RS Q8	Frank Stippler	2019-09-13	Audi conducted test, SUV lap time record (before Porsche Cayenne GT record), Pirelli P Zero.
	7:42.34	Porsche Taycan Turbo	Lars Kern	2019-08	Porsche conducted test, pre-production model.
20,600 m	7:42.39	Porsche Cayman GT4 (981, 2015, N/A 3.8, 385 PS)	Christian Gebhardt	2015-04	Sport Auto (05/2015), Michelin Pilot Sport Cup 2 N0.
20,600 m	7:42.659	Alpine A110S (2022, 1.8 T, 300 PS)	Christian Gebhardt	2022-10	Sport Auto (10/2022), Michelin Pilot Sport Cup 2 (Semislicks), Aero Package.
20,600 m	7:42.99	BMW M2 CS (F87, 2020)	Christian Gebhardt	2020-08-12	Sport Auto (09/2020), Michelin Pilot Sport Cup 2.
	7:43	Porsche 911 GT3 RS (996)	Walter Röhrl	2004-10	Motor Magazine (10/2004), Pirelli P Zero Corsa.
20,832 m	7:43.65	Nissan GT-R	Sascha Bert	2010-11	Auto Bild Sportscars (11/2010), Dunlop SP Sport 600 DSST.
20,600 m	7:43.92	Aston Martin V8 Vantage (2019)	Christian Gebhardt	2019-08-14	Sport Auto (02/2020), Pirelli P Zero A6A.
20,600 m	7:44	Audi R8 Coupé 5.2 FSI Quattro (Mk1, Type 42, 2009, 525 PS)	Horst von Saurma	2009	Sport Auto (09/2009), Pirelli P Zero Corsa.
	7:44	Bugatti EB110 SS	Loris Bicocchi	1993	Bugatti conducted test with test driver Loris Bicocchi.
20,600 m	7:44	Pagani Zonda S 7.3 (2002)	Horst von Saurma	2002	Sport Auto (2002), Michelin Pilot Sport.
20,600 m	7:44	Porsche 911 Carrera S (991.1, pre-facelift, 2011, N/A 3.8, 400 PS)	Horst von Saurma	2011	Sport Auto (12/2011), Pirelli P Zero.
20,600 m	7:44	Porsche 911 Turbo S (997.2, facelift, 2011, 3.8 TT, 530 PS)	Horst von Saurma	2011	Sport Auto (03/2011), Bridgestone Potenza RE050A.
20,600 m	7:44.13	Mercedes-AMG C63 S Coupe (W205, facelift, 2019, 4.0 BT, 510 PS)	Christian Gebhardt	2019	Sport Auto (03/2019), Michelin Pilot Super Sport.
20,832 m	7:44.42	Mercedes-Benz SLS AMG	Sascha Bert	2010-11	Auto Bild Sportscars (11/2010), Continental Sport Contact 5P.
20,600 m	7:45	Audi R8 Plus (Mk1, Type 42, 2013, N/A 5.2, 550 PS)	Horst von Saurma	2013	Sport Auto (05/2013), Pirelli P Zero Corsa R02.
	7:45	Mercedes-Benz CLK63 AMG Black Series	Bernd Schneider	2007-05-01	Car and Driver News, Pirelli P Zero Corsa.
20,600 m	7:45.19	Mercedes-AMG E63 S 4MATIC+ Estate (W213, 2017, 612 PS)	Christian Gebhardt	2017-09-22	Sport Auto (12/2017), Michelin Pilot Sport 4S, fastest estate car.
20,600 m	7:45.34	Mercedes-AMG CLA45s 4MATIC+ (C118, 2022)	Christian Gebhardt	2022-02-02	Sport Auto (03/2022), Pirelli P Zero Trofeo R MO1.
20,600 m	7:45.59	Hyundai Ioniq 5 N	Christian Gebhardt	2024-01-18	Sport Auto (01/2024), Pirelli P Zero Corsa.
20,600 m	7:46	Mercedes-Benz C63 AMG Coupe Black Series	Horst von Saurma	2011	Sport Auto (01/2012), Dunlop Sport Maxx Race M0.
20,600 m	7:46	Porsche 911 GT2 (996.1, 2001, 462 PS)	Horst von Saurma	2001	Sport Auto (06/2001)
20,600 m	7:46	Lamborghini Gallardo LP570-4 Superleggera	Horst von Saurma	2007	Sport Auto (09/2007), Pirelli P Zero Corsa.
20,600 m	7:46.70	Porsche 718 Cayman S (982)	Christian Gebhardt	2016-09	Sport Auto (10/2016), Pirelli P Zero N1.
20,600 m	7:47	Porsche 911 GT3 RS (996)	Horst von Saurma	2004	Sport Auto (3/2004), Pirelli P Zero Corsa.
20,600 m	7:47	Porsche 911 Turbo (997.2, facelift, 2011, 3.8 TT, 500 PS)	Horst von Saurma	2011	Sport Auto (03/2011), Bridgestone Potenza RE050A.
20,600 m	7:47	Ferrari 599 GTB Fiorano	Horst von Saurma	2007	Sport Auto (08/2007), Pirelli P Zero.
20,600 m	7:47	Lamborghini Murciélago LP640	Horst von Saurma	2007	Sport Auto (01/2007), E-gear, Pirelli P Zero Corsa.
20,600 m	7:47	Wiesmann GT MF5	Horst von Saurma	2010-07	Sport Auto (07/2010), Michelin Pilot Sport Cup+.
	7:47.19	Volkswagen Golf GTI Clubsport S (2016)		2016-12-07	Volkswagen conducted test, special Nürburgring set-up. FWD car record (before 2017 Civic Type R), video confirmed.
20,832 m	7:47.31	Volkswagen Golf VIII R 333 "20 Years" (Mk8, 333 PS, 2022)	Benjamin Leuchter	2022-09-21	Volkswagen conducted test, the fastest Golf R of all times, R-Performance Package, R-Performance Torque Vectoring. Bridgestone tyres. Video confirmed.
	7:48	BMW M3 GTS (E92, 2010)	Horst von Saurma	2010	Sport Auto Spezial (09/2010), Pirelli P Zero Corsa.
20,600 m	7:48	Porsche 911 GT3 RS (997.1)	Horst von Saurma	2007	Sport Auto (03/2007), Michelin Pilot Sport Cup.
20,600 m	7:48	Porsche 911 GT3 (997.1)	Horst von Saurma	2006	Sport Auto (07/2006), Michelin Pilot Sport Cup.
20,600 m	7:48.13	Lotus Exige Cup 380 (2017)	Christian Gebhardt	2017-07-27	Sport Auto (01/2018), Michelin Pilot Sport Cup 2.
20,600 m	7:48.40	Audi TT RS (8S, 2017, 2.5 T, 400 PS)	Christian Gebhardt	2017-05-17	Sport Auto (10/2017), Pirelli P Zero Corsa.
20,600 m	7:48.80	Mercedes-AMG A45 S 4MATIC+ (W177)	Christian Gebhardt	2019-10-24	Sport Auto (04/2020), Pirelli P Zero Trofeo R MO1.
20,600 m	7:49	BMW Alpina B3 Coupe GT3 (E92, 2012, 3.0 T, 408 PS)	Horst von Saurma	2012	Sport Auto (10/2012), Michelin Pilot Sport Cup.
20,600 m	7:49	Chevrolet Corvette Z06 (C6, 2007, N/A 7.0, 512 PS)	Horst von Saurma	2007-06-22	Sport Auto (06/2007), Goodyear Eagle F1 Supercar EMT.
	7:49.21	Volkswagen Golf GTI Clubsport S	Benny Leuchter	2016-04-20	Volkswagen conducted test, special Nürburgring set-up. FWD car record, video confirmed.
	7:49.369	Mercedes-Benz GLC63s AMG 4MATIC+ (X253)	Markus Hofbauer	2018-11-22	Mercedes-Benz conducted test, officially measured and notarised record lap time as the fastest series-production SUV (before Audi RS Q8 lap time record).
20,600 m	7:50	Aston Martin V8 Vantage GT8 (2017, N/A 4.7, 446 PS)	Christian Gebhardt	2017-02	Sport Auto (3/2017), Michelin Pilot Sport Cup 2.
20,600 m	7:50	BMW M3 CSL (E46, 2004)	Horst von Saurma	2003	Sport Auto (08/2003), Michelin Pilot Sport Cup.
20,600 m	7:50	Lamborghini Murciélago	Horst von Saurma	2002	Sport Auto (06/2002)
20,600 m	7:50	Porsche 911 Carrera S (997.2, 2009)	Horst von Saurma	2008	Sport Auto (08/2008), Michelin Pilot Sport Cup N0, PCCB, PDK, Sport Chrono Plus.
	7:50.230	Mercedes-Benz SLS AMG Coupe Electric Drive (2013, 751 PS)	Markus Hofbauer	2013-06-03	Mercedes-Benz conducted test. 7:56.234 on the 20,832 m lap. Small-scale production car (9 examples were produced). The fastest lap on electric supercar (before NIO EP9 lap record).
20,600 m	7:51	Mercedes-Benz SL65 AMG Black Series	Horst von Saurma	2009	Sport Auto (05/2009), Dunlop SportMaxx GT.
	7:51	Volkswagen Golf VIII R (Mk8, 2020, 320 PS)	Gerd Stegmaier	2020	Auto motor und sport
	7:51.7	Alfa Romeo Stelvio Quadrifoglio (2018)	Fabio Francia	2017	Alfa Romeo conducted test. Pirelli tyre. Equipped with OEM optional racing seat, harness and carbon-ceramic brakes. Equipped with roll cage.
20,600 m	7:52	Aston Martin V12 Vantage S	Horst von Saurma	2014	Sport Auto (8/2014), Pirelli P Zero Corsa, 8-speed Sportshift III automatic.
20,600 m	7:52	BMW M4 (F82, 2014, 431 PS)	Horst von Saurma	2014	Sport Auto (07/2014), Michelin Pilot Super Sport.
20,600 m	7:52	Ford GT (Mk1, 2006, 550 PS)	Horst von Saurma	2006	Sport Auto (02/2006), Goodyear Eagle F1 Supercar.
20,600 m	7:52	Lamborghini Gallardo E-Gear (pre-facelift, 2003, 500 PS)	Horst von Saurma	2003	Sport Auto (12/2003), Pirelli P Zero Corsa, E-Gear automatic.
20,600 m	7:52	Lamborghini Gallardo LP560-4 (2008, 560 PS)	Horst von Saurma	2008	Sport Auto (11/2008), Pirelli P Zero Corsa.
20,600 m	7:52	Mercedes-Benz SLR McLaren	Klaus Ludwig	2004	Sport Auto (06/2004), Michelin Pilot Sport 2.
20,600 m	7:52	Porsche Boxster Spyder (981, 2015, N/A 3.8, 375 PS)	Christian Gebhardt	2015	Sport Auto (11/2015), Pirelli P Zero.
20,600 m	7:52	Porsche Panamera Turbo S (970, pre-facelift, 2012, 4.8 TT, 550 PS)	Horst von Saurma	2012	Sport Auto (04/2012), PDK, Michelin Pilot Sport.
20,600 m	7:52.11	BMW Alpina B4 Gran Coupè (G26, 2023, 3.0 TT, 495 PS)	Christian Gebhardt	2023-01-12	Sport Auto (02/2023), Pirelli P Zero ALP.
20,600 m	7:52.17	Toyota GR Supra (A90/J29)	Christian Gebhardt	2019-08-22	Sport Auto (01/2020), Michelin Pilot Super Sport.
20,600 m	7:52.36	BMW M2 Competition (F87)	Christian Gebhardt	2018-09-12	Sport Auto (11/2018), Michelin Pilot Super Sport.
20,832 m	7:52.39	Wiesmann GT MF5	Sascha Bert	2010-10	Auto Bild Sportscars (11/2010), Michelin Pilot Sport Cup.
20,600 m	7:53.26	BMW Alpina B3 (G20, 2021, 3.0 TT, 462 PS)	Christian Gebhardt	2020-12-17	Sport Auto (01/2021), Pirelli P Zero ALP.
20,600 m	7:53.69	Volkswagen Golf VIII R "20 Years" (Mk8, 2023, 333 PS)	Christian Gebhardt	2023	Sport Auto (05/2023), Bridgestone Potenza Race.
20,600 m	7:54	Mercedes-Benz CLK DTM AMG (W209, 2004, 582 PS)	Marcus Schurig (chief-editor of "Sport Auto" magazine)	2005-02	Sport Auto (03/2005), cold track conditions, Dunlop SP Sport Super Race semi-slicks, 5-speed AMG SPEEDSHIFT automatic.
20,600 m	7:54	Porsche 911 GT3 (996)	Horst von Saurma	2003	Sport Auto (6/2003), Michelin Pilot Sport N2.
20,600 m	7:54	Porsche 911 Turbo (997.1, pre-facelift, 2007, 3.6 TT, 480 PS)	Horst von Saurma	2007	Sport Auto (05/2007), Michelin Pilot Sport Cup N0.
20,600 m	7:54	BMW M5 Competition (F10, 2014, 575 PS)	Horst von Saurma	2014	Sport Auto (12/2014), Michelin Pilot Super Sport.
	7:54.36	Renault Mégane III RS 275 Trophy-R	Laurent Hurgon	2014-06-16	Test realised by Renault Sport
20,600 m	7:55	Mercedes-Benz E63 AMG S 4MATIC (W212R, second facelift, 2013, B/T 5.5, 585 PS)	Horst von Saurma	2013-09	Sport Auto (09/2013)
	7:55	Caterham R500 Superlight	Robert Nearn	2000	Evo Magazine (07/2000)
20,600 m	7:55	Ferrari F430 F1	Horst von Saurma	2005	Sport Auto (01/2006), Pirelli P Zero Corsa.
20,600 m	7:55.12	Renault Mégane IV R.S. Trophy-R (No. 25 of 500)	Christian Gebhardt	2019	Sport Auto (06/2019), Bridgestone Potenza S007 RS, carbon-ceramic brake package.
20,600 m	7:55.409	BMW Z4 M40i (G29)	Christian Gebhardt	2018-09-12	Sport Auto (10/2018), Michelin Pilot Super Sport.
	7:56	Chevrolet Corvette Z06 (C5)	Dave Hill		crossedflags.com
20,600 m	7:56	Ferrari California (Type F149, 2010, 460 PS)	Horst von Saurma	2010	Sport Auto (06/2010), Pirelli P Zero.
20,600 m	7:56	Ferrari 360 Challenge Stradale F1	Horst von Saurma	2004	Sport Auto (02/2004), sport tyres.
20,600 m	7:56	Porsche 911 Turbo (996, 2000, 3.6 TT, 420 PS)	Horst von Saurma	2000	Sport Auto (06/2000)
	7:56	Porsche Panamera Turbo (970, pre-facelift, 2009, 4.8 TT, 500 PS)	Walter Röhrl	2009	Motor Trend (07/2009)
20,600 m	7:56.10	Alpine A110 S (2020, 1.8 T, 292 PS)	Christian Gebhardt	2020	Sport Auto (10/2020), Michelin Pilot Sport 4.
20,832 m	7:56.50	Mercedes-Benz CLK DTM AMG (W209, 2006, 582 PS)	Klaus Ludwig	2006-03	Auto Bild Sportscars (03/2006), semi-slicks, 5-speed AMG SPEEDSHIFT automatic.
20,832 m	7:56.65	Lamborghini Gallardo SE (2006, 520 PS)	Tom Kristensen	2006-03	Auto Bild Sportscars (03/2006), E-Gear automatic.
20,600 m	7:56.73	Honda NSX-R (NA2)	Motoharu Kurosawa	2002	Best Motoring Video Special Vol. 55 "NA2 NSX-R" (2002), video confirmed
20,600 m	7:57	Volkswagen Golf VII GTI Clubsport S (Mk7, 2016, 2.0 T, 310 PS)	Christian Gebhardt	2016	Sport Auto (07/2016), Michelin Pilot Sport Cup 2.
	7:58	BMW M2 (F87)	Jörg Weidinger	2015-12	Car Magazine (12/2015), Michelin Pilot Super Sport.
20,600 m	7:58.29	Ford Mustang Mach 1 (Mk6, 2021, N/A 5.0, 460 PS)	Christian Gebhardt	2021-11-03	Sport Auto (12/2021), Michelin Pilot Sport 4S.
	7:58.4	SEAT León Mk3 Cupra	Jordi Gené	2014-03	SEAT conducted test
20,600 m	7:58.52	Audi RS4 Avant (B9)	Christian Gebhardt	2018-07-12	Sport Auto (08/2018)
20,600 m	7:58.59	BMW M240i xDrive (G42, 2022, 3.0 T, 374 PS)	Christian Gebhardt	2022	Sport Auto (07/2022), Michelin Pilot Sport 4S.
20,600 m	7:58.99	Cupra Formentor VZ5 (2023, 390 PS)	Christian Gebhardt	2023	Sport Auto (01/2023), Goodyear Eagle F1 SuperSport.
20,600 m	7:59	Audi RS5 Coupe (8T)	Horst von Saurma	2012-06	Sport Auto (06/2012), Pirelli P Zero.
20,600 m	7:59	Lotus Evora 400(2016, 3.5 S/C, 406 PS)	Christian Gebhardt	2016	Sport Auto (03/2016), Pirelli P Zero Trofeo R.
20,600 m	7:59	Mercedes-Benz CLS63 AMG (W218, facelift, 2013)	Horst von Saurma	2013-07	Sport Auto (07/2013), facelift model with 557 PS, Continental Conti Sport Contact 5P.
	7:59	Porsche 911 Carrera S (996)	Walter Röhrl	2004	'Wheels' magazine (06/2004), PASM setting "Performance"
	7:59.32	Cadillac CTS-V (2009)	John Heinricy	2008-05-09	General Motors conducted test, video confirmed
	7:59.74	Porsche Cayenne Turbo S (958.2)			Porsche conducted test
	7:59.887	Nissan Skyline GT-R R33	Dirk Schoysman	1996	Nissan conducted test, roll cage, controversial
20,600 m	8:00	BMW Alpina B4 S Biturbo Coupe (F32, 2018, 3.0 BT, 440 PS)	Christian Gebhardt	2017	Sport Auto (04/2018), Michelin Pilot Sport 4S.
20,600 m	8:01	BMW M2 (F87, 2016, 3.0 T, 370 PS)	Christian Gebhardt	2016	Sport Auto (05/2016), Michelin Pilot Super Sport.
20,832 m	8:01	Bugatti EB110 SS		1993	Sport Auto (10/1993), Michelin Pilot SX MXX3 AP.
20,600 m	8:01	Honda Civic Type R (FK8, 2018, 2.0 T, 320 PS)	Christian Gebhardt	2018	Sport Auto (02/2018), Continental Sport Contact 6.
20,600 m	8:01	Mercedes-Benz C63 AMG Coupe Performance Package (W204)	Horst von Saurma	2013-03	Sport Auto (03/2013), Continental Conti SportContact 5P.
20,600 m	8:01.72	Nissan Skyline GT-R R33	Motoharu Kurosawa	1995	Best Motoring Video Special Vol. 32
20,832 m	8:01.84	Lamborghini Gallardo Spyder (2007, 520 PS)	Wolfgang Kaufmann	2007-05	Auto Bild Sportscars (06/2007), 6-speed E-Gear automatic.
	8:01.90	Audi R8 4.2 FSI R-Tronic	Sascha Bert	2008-10-27	Auto Bild Sportscars (11/2008)
20,600 m	8:02	Aston Martin DBS	Horst von Saurma	2009	Sport Auto (01/2009), Pirelli P Zero.
20,600 m	8:02	Volkswagen Golf VIII R (Mk8, 2022, 320 PS)	Christian Gebhardt	2022	Sport Auto (04/2022), Bridgestone Potenza S005.
20,600 m	8:02.66	Volkswagen Golf VIII GTI Clubsport "45 Jähre GTI" (Mk8, 2021, 2.0 T, 300 PS)	Christian Gebhardt	2021-10-06	Sport Auto (11/2021), Michelin Pilot Sport Cup 2 N0.
20,600 m	8:03	Aston Martin V8 Vantage (Mk1, 2005, 385 PS)	Horst von Saurma	2005	Sport Auto (10/2005)
20,600 m	8:03	Jaguar XKR-S	Horst von Saurma	2012	Sport Auto (03/2012), Pirelli P-Zero, six-speed automatic.
20,600 m	8:03	Mercedes-Benz CLS63 AMG Performance Package (W218, pre-facelift, 2011)	Horst von Saurma	2011-05	Sport Auto (05/2011), pre-facelift model with 557 PS, Continental Conti Sport Contact 5P.
20,600 m	8:03	Porsche 911 GT3 (996.1, pre-facelift, 1999, 360 PS)	Horst von Saurma	1999	Sport Auto (08/1999)
20,600 m	8:03.33	Alpine A110 (2019, 1.8 T, 252 PS)	Christian Gebhardt	2019-05-15	Sport Auto (06/2019), Michelin Pilot Sport 4.
20,832 m	8:03.86	Honda NSX-R (NA1)	Motoharu Kurosawa	1992/10/19	Best Motoring Video Special Vol. 25 "NA1 NSX-R" (1995), video confirmed
20,600 m	8:03.86	Mini Cooper S JCW GP (Mk3, F56, 2020, 2.0 T, 306 PS)	Christian Gebhardt	2020-07-14	Sport Auto (08/2020), Hankook Ventus TD.
20,600 m	8:04	Lamborghini Diablo GT	Horst von Saurma	2000	Sport Auto (07/2000), Pirelli P Zero.
20,600 m	8:04	Audi R8 4.2 FSI Quattro (Mk1, Type 42, 2007, N/A 4.2, 420 PS)	Horst von Saurma	2007	Sport Auto (07/2007), Pirelli P Zero Corsa, manual transmission.
20,600 m	8:04	Mercedes-Benz A45 AMG 4MATIC (W176, facelift)	Christian Gebhardt	2016-02	Sport Auto (02/2016), facelift model with 381 PS, Michelin Pilot Sport Cup 2R.
20,600 m	8:04	Porsche Boxster S (981.1, pre-facelift, 2012, N/A 3.4, 315 PS)	Horst von Saurma	2012	Sport Auto (07/2012), Pirelli P Zero, PDK, PCCB, PASM.
	8:04	Volkswagen Golf VII R (Mk7, 1-st faselift, 2018, 310 PS)	Horst von Saurma	2018-06-27	Autozeitung (15/2018), Michelin Pilot Sport Cup 2.
	8:04.40	Alfa Romeo 4C	Horst von Saurma	2013-09-12	Sport Auto (10/2013), Alfa Romeo conducted test. Pirelli P Zero Trofeo.
	8:04.52	Porsche Carrera 4S PDK (997)	Sascha Bert	2008-10-27	Auto Bild Sportscars (11/2008)
20,600 m	8:04.92	VW Golf VII GTI TCR (Mk7, 2-nd facelift, 2019, 2.0 T 290 PS)	Christian Gebhardt	2019-07-03	Sport Auto (12/2019), Michelin Pilot Sport Cup 2 N0.
20,600 m	8:05	Audi RS6 Avant (C7)	Horst von Saurma	2014	Sport Auto (01/2014), Pirelli P Zero R 01.
20,600 m	8:05	BMW M3 (E92)	Horst von Saurma	2007-12	Sport Auto (12/2007), Michelin Pilot Sport Cup+.
20,600 m	8:05	BMW M5 (F10)	Horst von Saurma	2012	Sport Auto (09/2012), Michelin Pilot Supersport.
20,600 m	8:05	Ferrari 575M Maranello	Horst von Saurma	2002	Sport Auto (12/2002)
20,600 m	8:05	Mercedes-Benz CLK63 Black Series	Horst von Saurma	2007	Sport Auto (03/2008), Pirelli P Zero Corsa.
20,600 m	8:05	Porsche 911 Carrera S (997.1, 2005, N/A 3.8, 355 PS)	Horst von Saurma	2005	Sport Auto (05/2005)
20,600 m	8:05	Porsche Cayman S (981.1, 2013, PDK, N/A 3.4, 325 PS)	Horst von Saurma	2013	Sport Auto (06/2013), Pirelli P Zero, PDK automatic.
20,600 m	8:05.19	Hyundai i30 N Performance Package (PD, facelift, 2022, 2.0 T, 280 PS)	Christian Gebhardt	2021-12-08	Sport Auto (01/2022), Pirelli P Zero Trofeo R.
20,600 m	8:06	Mercedes-Benz SL55 AMG (R230, 2003, 500 PS)	Horst von Saurma	2003	Updated data of Supertest from Sport Auto (04/2002) (In Supertest of Aston Martin DB7 GT, Sport Auto (07/2003)) of facelift version Mercedes-Benz SL55 AMG (R230, 500 PS) with speed limiter on 300 km/h in magazine category — Sport Auto (07/2003)
20,600 m	8:06.01	Subaru WRX STi Spec-C (Prototype)	Motoharu Kurosawa	2004	Best Motoring Video 'NISMO Beast Unleashed'
20,600 m	8:06.29	Ford Focus RS (Mk III, 2016, 2.5 T, 350 PS)	Christian Gebhardt	2017	Sport Auto (01/2017), Michelin Pilot Sport Cup 2.
	8:06.56	Honda NSX (NA1)	Fredrik Sørlie	2016-09	BTG, Kumho HU36, D2 coilovers.
20,600 m	8:07	Ferrari 550 Maranello	Horst von Saurma	1998	Sport Auto (06/1998)
	8:07	Ford Mustang GT Performance Pack	Horst von Saurma	2015	Autozeitung Sport & Luxury Cars (03/2015)
20,600 m	8:07	Volkswagen Golf VII GTI Clubsport (Mk7, 2016, 2.0 T, 265 PS)	Christian Gebhardt	2016	Sport Auto (07/2016), Michelin Pilot Sport Cup.
20,832 m	8:07.76	BMW M6 Coupe (E63, 2006, 507 PS)	Prinz Leopold von Bayern	2006-03	Auto Bild Sportscars (03/2006), 7-speed SMG-III automatic.
	8:07.97	Renault Mégane Renault Sport 265 Trophy	Laurent Hurgon	2011-06-17	Renault Sport conducted test, Bridgestone RE 050A (235/35 R19).
	8:08.73	Porsche 911 Turbo 3.3	Motoharu Kurosawa	1991	Best Motoring conducted test
20,600 m	8:09	Audi RS4 (B7)	Horst von Saurma	2006	Sport Auto (06/2006)
20,600 m	8:09	Audi TT RS (Mk2, 8J, 2010, 2.5 T, 340 PS)	Horst von Saurma	2010	Sport Auto (02/2010), Michelin Pilot Sport.
20,600 m	8:09	Ferrari 360 Modena	Horst von Saurma	1999	Sport Auto (10/1999)
20,600 m	8:09	BMW M6 Coupe (E63, 2005, 507 PS)	Horst von Saurma	2005	Sport Auto (12/2005), sport tyres, 7-speed SMG-III automatic, 259 km/h speed limiter.
20,600 m	8:09	Honda NSX-R (NA2, 2002, facelift, 280 PS)	Horst von Saurma	2002	Sport Auto (08/2002), sport tyres, suspension modification.
20,600 m	8:09	Lamborghini Diablo SuperVeloce	Horst von Saurma	1997	Sport Auto (12/1997), Pirelli P Zero Asimmetrico.
20,600 m	8:10	Chrysler Viper GTS	Horst von Saurma	1997	Sport Auto (10/1997)
20,600 m	8:10	Donkervoort D8 180R (2001, 1.8T, 240 PS	Horst von Saurma	2001	Sport Auto (03/2001)
20,600 m	8:10	KTM X-Bow (2010, 2.0 T, 240 PS)	Horst von Saurma	2010	Sport Auto (04/2010), Toyo Proxess R888.
	8:10	Porsche Boxster S (987)			Porsche conducted test, reported by Süddeutsche Zeitung
	8:10	Porsche Cayman R (987.2)	Horst von Saurma	2011	Sport Auto (10/2011), Bridgestone Potenza RE50A. Lap time with Continental Conti Force Contact – 8 min. 06 sec.
20,600 m	8:10	BMW Alpina B6 S (E63)	Horst von Saurma	2008	Sport Auto (05/2008)
20,600 m	8:10	Mercedes-Benz A45 AMG 4MATIC (W176, pre-facelift)	Horst von Saurma	2014-03	Sport Auto (03/2014), pre-facelift model with 360 PS, Dunlop SportMaxx RT.
20,600 m	8:10	Mercedes-Benz E63 AMG (W212, pre-facelift, 2010, N/A 6.2, 525 PS)	Horst von Saurma	2010	Sport Auto (03/2010), Continental Conti Sport Contact 5.
20,832 m	8:11.1	Lamborghini Gallardo Spyder (2007, 520 PS)	Dierk Möller-Sonntag	2007	Auto Bild Sportscars (11/2007), Pirelli P Zero Corsa.
	8:11.16	Mitsubishi Lancer Evo IX	Takayuki Kinoshita		Best Motoring Video 14. Wet conditions, not a true time attack.
19,100 m	8:11.72	Tesla Model 3 Performance		2020	L'argus (09/2020) Bridge-to-Gantry time.
20,600 m	8:12	Mercedes-Benz SL55 AMG (R230, 2002, 476 PS)	Horst von Saurma	2002	Sport Auto (04/2002), Pirelli P Zero Rosso, 476 PS version, standard speed limiter to 250 km/h.
20,600 m	8:12	Renault Megane IV RS (Mk IV, 2019, 280 PS)	Christian Gebhardt	2019	Sport Auto (01/2019), Bridgestone Potenza S001.
20,832 m	8:12.8	Porsche 911 Turbo Cabrio (997.1, pre-facelift, 2007, 480 PS)	Dierk Möller-Sonntag	2007	Auto Bild Sportscars (11/2007), Michelin Pilot Sport 2.
20,600 m	8:13	BMW M5 (E60)	Horst von Saurma	2004	Sport Auto (12/2004), Continental Conti Sport Contact 2.
20,600 m	8:13	Dodge Viper SRT-10 roadster (ZB)	Horst von Saurma	2007	Sport Auto (2007), Michelin Pilot Sport.
20,600 m	8:13	Lotus Esprit Sport 350	Horst von Saurma	1999	Sport Auto (05/1999)
20,600 m	8:13	Mercedes-Benz C63 AMG (W204)	Horst von Saurma	2008	Sport Auto (02/2009), Michelin Pilot Sport 2, Performance Package (LSD, composite brakes, sport suspension).
	8:13	Porsche Cayenne Turbo (958)		2012	Porsche conducted test, air suspension, PDCC, no PASM.
20,600 m	8:14	Artega GT	Horst von Saurma	2010	Sport Auto (12/2010), Continental Conti ForceContact, DSG, optional sport suspension.
20,600 m	8:14	BMW Alpina B3 Biturbo (F30, 2014, 3.0 BT, 410 PS)	Horst von Saurma	2014	Sport Auto (05/2014), Michelin Pilot Super Sport.
20,600 m	8:14	BMW Alpina B3 Biturbo Coupé (E92, 2008, 3.0 BT, 360 PS)	Horst von Saurma	2008	Sport Auto (12/2008), optional LSD and 19 inch wheels.
20,600 m	8:14	Maserati GranTurismo MC Stradale (M145, 2012, N/A 4.7, 450 PS)	Horst von Saurma	2012	Sport Auto (11/2012), Pirelli P Zero Corsa.
20,600 m	8:14	Mercedes-Benz SL65 AMG (R230, pre-facelift, 2005)	Horst von Saurma	2005	Sport Auto (02/2005)
20,600 m	8:14	Mercedes-Benz SLK55 AMG Black Series	Horst von Saurma	2007	Sport Auto (08/2007)
	8:14	Range Rover Sport SVR (2015)		2014-05	Range Rover conducted test.
20,600 m	8:14	Seat Leon Cupra (Mk3, 5F, 2015, 2.0 T, 280 PS)	Horst von Saurma	2015	Sport Auto (01/2015), Michelin Pilot Sport Cup 2.
	8:14	Volkswagen Golf VII R (Mk7, pre-facelift, 2013, 300 PS)		2013	Autozeitung (19/2013), according to Volkswagen company claimed lap time for VW Golf R (Mk7, pre-facelift).
20,600 m	8:14.93	Toyota GR Yaris (Mk4, XP210, 2021, 1.5 T, 261 PS)	Christian Gebhardt	2021-04-07	Sport Auto (05/2021), Michelin Pilot Sport 4S.
	8:14.98	Mitsubishi Lancer Evolution VIII MR GSR	Motoharu Kurosawa	2003	Best Motoring conducted test
20,600 m	8:15	BMW 1 Series M Coupé (E82)	Horst von Saurma	2011	Sport Auto (07/2011), Michelin Pilot Sport.
20,600 m	8:15	BMW Alpina Roadster S (E85, 2005, 300 PS)	Horst von Saurma	2005	Sport Auto (07/2005), Michelin Pilot Sport Cup.
20,600 m	8:15	Chevrolet Corvette (C6, 2005, N/A 6.0, 404 PS)	Horst von Saurma	2005	Sport Auto (08/2005)
20,600 m	8:15	Honda Civic Type R (FK2)	Christian Gebhardt	2016	Sport Auto (04/2016), Continental Conti SportContact 6, manual.
20,600 m	8:15.10	Volkswagen Golf VII R (Mk7, pre-facelift, 2.0 T, 300 PS)	Horst von Saurma	2014	Sport Auto (10/2014), Bridgestone Potenza RE050A.
20,600 m	8:16	Aston Martin DB9 (2004, 456 PS)	Horst von Saurma	2004	Sport Auto (11/2004)
20,600 m	8:16	Audi TT S Coupe (Mk3, FV/8S, 2015, 2.0 T, 310 PS)	Christian Gebhardt	2015	Sport Auto (06/2015), Pirelli P Zero.
20,600 m	8:16	BMW M235i (F22, 2015, 3.0 T, 322 PS)	Christian Gebhardt	2015	Sport Auto (04/2015), Michelin Pilot Super Sport.
	8:16.15	Honda NSX (NA1)	Motoharu Kurosawa	1990	Best Motoring Video Special Vol. 15 "The Honda NSX" (1990), video confirmed
20,832 m	8:16.52	BMW M6 Cabrio (E64, 2007, 507 PS)	Wolfgang Kaufmann	2007-05	Auto Bild Sportscars (06/2007), 7-speed SMG-III automatic.
	8:16.90	Renault Mégane RS R26.R	Vincent Baylé	2008-06-23	Renault Sport conducted test, video confirmed
20,600 m	8:17	Aston Martin V12 Vanquish	Horst von Saurma	2003	Sport Auto (01/2003)
20,600 m	8:17	Porsche 911 Carrera (996.1, pre-facelift, 1998, 300 PS)	Horst von Saurma	1998	Sport Auto (01/1998)
20,600 m	8:17	Porsche 911 Carrera (996.2, facelift, 2001, 320 PS)	Horst von Saurma	2001	Sport Auto (10/2001)
20,600 m	8:17	Porsche Cayman S (987.2, facelift 2009)	Horst von Saurma	2009	Sport Auto (12/2009), Bridgestone Potenza RE 050A N1, PDK, LSD, PASM, Sport Chrono options.
20,600 m	8:18	BMW M135i (F20, 2012)	Horst von Saurma	2012	Sport Auto (01/2013), Michelin Pilot Super Sport, manual, Adaptive M suspension.
20,600 m	8:18	BMW Z8 (E52, 2000, 400 PS)	Horst von Saurma	2000	Sport Auto (08/2000)
20,600 m	8:18	Chevrolet Corvette C5 Commemorative Edition (2003, 344 PS)	Horst von Saurma	2003	Sport Auto (09/2003)
20,600 m	8:18	Ford Mustang GT (Mk6, S550, facelift, 2020, N/A 5.0, 450 PS)	Christian Gebhardt	2020	Sport Auto (11/2020), Michelin Pilot Sport 4S.
20,600 m	8:18	Lexus IS-F	Horst von Saurma	2009	Sport Auto (09/2008), Michelin Pilot Sport.
20,600 m	8:18	Maserati GranSport	Horst von Saurma	2005	Sport Auto (09/2005)
20,600 m	8:18	Porsche Boxster S (987.2, facelift 2009)	Horst von Saurma	2009	Sport Auto (12/2009), Bridgestone Potenza RE 050A N1, PDK, LSD, PASM, Sport Chrono options.
20,600 m	8:18	Ferrari F355	Horst von Saurma	1997	Sport Auto (06/1997)
	8:19.47	Holden VF SS Redline Ute	Rob Trubiani	2013-04	Holden Blog (04/2013)
20,600 m	8:20	Audi RS3 Sportback (8P, 2011, 2.5 T, 340 PS)	Horst von Saurma	2011	Sport Auto (06/2011), Continental Conti Sport Contact 5P.
20,600 m	8:20	Audi RS6 (C5)	Horst von Saurma	2002	Sport Auto (9/2002)
	8:20	Chevrolet Camaro SS (2010)		2008	General Motors conducted test.
20,600 m	8:20	Hyundai i30 N Performance Package (PD, pre-facelift, 2018, 2.0 T, 275 PS)	Christian Gebhardt	2018	Sport Auto (05/2018), Pirelli P Zero.
20,600 m	8:20	Opel Astra OPC (J, P10, 2012, 2.0 T, 280 PS)	Horst von Saurma	2012	Sport Auto (12/2012), Pirelli P Zero.
20,600 m	8:22	BMW M3 (E46)	Horst von Saurma	2000	Sport Auto (12/2000), Michelin Pilot Sport.
20,600 m	8:22	BMW Z3 M Coupe (E36/8, 1998, 321 PS)	Horst von Saurma	1998	Sport Auto (10/1998)
20,600 m	8:22	Mercedes-Benz C55 AMG (W203)	Horst von Saurma	2004	Sport Auto (7/2004), Pirelli P Zero Rosso.
20,600 m	8:22.33	Ford Fiesta ST Edition (Mk7, B479, 2022, 1.5 T, 200 PS)	Christian Gebhardt	2022	Sport Auto (11/2022), Michelin Pilot Sport Cup 2.
	8:22.38	Nissan Skyline GT-R R32	Motoharu Kurosawa	1989	Best Motoring Video Special Vol. 6. semi-wet (damp) condition lap time.
20,600 m	8:22.70	Ford Focus ST (Mk4, C519, 2021, 2.3 T, 280 PS)	Christian Gebhardt	2021	Sport Auto (03/2021), Michelin Pilot Sport 4S.
	8:22.85	Chevrolet Cobalt SS/TC (2007)		2007	Motor Trend (10/2007)
20,600 m	8:23	Aston Martin DB7 GT	Horst von Saurma	2003	Sport Auto (07/2003)
20,600 m	8:23	Porsche Boxster S (987.1, pre-facelift, 2006, 282 PS)	Horst von Saurma	2006	Sport Auto (04/2006), Michelin Pilot Sport 2 N1, manual, Sport Chrono, PASM.
20,600 m	8:23	Porsche 911 Carrera 4 (996.1, 2001, 300 PS)	Horst von Saurma	2001	Sport Auto (02/2001)
20,600 m	8:23	Renault Clio R.S. 220 Trophy (Mk4, 1-st facelift, 1.6 T, 220 PS)	Christian Gebhardt	2016	Sport Auto (01/2016), Dunlop Direzza 03G.
20,600 m	8:23.12	Porsche 911 Carrera RS (964)	Christian Gebhardt	2019	Sport Auto (10/2019), Pirelli P Zero Trofeo R N0.
20,600 m	8:24	BMW X6 M (E71, 2009, 555 PS)	Horst von Saurma	2009	Sport Auto (10/2009), Bridgestone Dueller HP Sport.
20,600 m	8:24	Mercedes-Benz SLK55 AMG (R171)	Horst von Saurma	2005	Sport Auto (04/2005)
20,600 m	8:24	Subaru Impreza WRX STi (GD, 2004, 265 PS)	Horst von Saurma	2004	Sport Auto (05/2004)
20,600 m	8:25	Audi RS4 Avant (B5)	Horst von Saurma	2000	Sport Auto (10/2000)
20,600 m	8:25	Callaway C12 Coupe	Horst von Saurma	1999	Sport Auto (04/1999)
20,600 m	8:25	Mitsubishi Carisma GT Evo VI (Mk6, 1999, 280 PS)	Horst von Saurma	1999	Sport Auto (11/1999), sport tyres.
20,600 m	8:25	Mitsubishi Carisma GT Evo VII (Mk7, 2002, 280 PS)	Horst von Saurma	2002	Sport Auto (11/2002), Yokohama ADVAN.
20,600 m	8:25	Lotus Exige S	Horst von Saurma	2008	Sport Auto (06/2008), Yokohama A048.
20,600 m	8:25	Jaguar XKR	Horst von Saurma	2006	Sport Auto (12/2006), Dunlop SP Sportmaxx, six-speed automatic.
	8:25	Porsche Cayman S (987.1, pre-facelift, 2006, 295 PS)	Horst von Saurma	2006	Sport Auto (11/2006), Michelin Pilot Sport 2 N1, PASM, Sport Chrono.
	8:26	Audi S5	Horst von Saurma	2008	Sport Auto (01/2008), Michelin Pilot Sport.
	8:26	BMW 335i Coupe (E92)	Horst von Saurma	2006	Sport Auto (10/2006), Bridgestone Potenza RE050A run-flat.
	8:26	Mercedes-Benz SLK32 AMG (R170)	Horst von Saurma	2001	Sport Auto (05/2001)
	8:26	Ford Focus RS (Mk2, C307, 2009, 305 PS)	Horst von Saurma	2009	Sport Auto (08/2009), Continental Conti SportContact 3.
	8:26	Nissan 350Z	Horst von Saurma	2003	Sport Auto (10/2003)
	8:27.27	Toyota GR86 (2023)	Christian Gebhardt	2022	Sport Auto (12/2022), Michelin Pilot Sport 4.
	8:28	BMW M5 (E39)	Horst von Saurma	1999	Sport Auto (3/1999)
	8:28	Mini John Cooper Works Pro (F56, 2017, 2.0 T, 231 PS)	Christian Gebhardt	2017	Sport Auto (04/2017), Pirelli P Zero.
	8:28	Porsche 911 Carrera (993)	Horst von Saurma	1997	Sport Auto (07/1997), lap time from rubric "DAS REFERENZ-AUTO" from Supertest of Chevrolet Corvette C5.
	8:28	Subaru WRX STi (Mk4, VA, facelift, 2015, 2.5 T, 300 PS)	Christian Gebhardt	2015	Sport Auto (07/2015), Dunlop tyres.
	8:28	Ford Fiesta ST (Mk7, B479, 2020, 1.5 T, 200 PS)	Christian Gebhardt	2020	Sport Auto (03/2020), Michelin Pilot Super Sport S1.
	8:29	Audi S4 Avant (B6)	Horst von Saurma	2003	Sport Auto (11/2003)
	8:29	Audi TTS Coupé (8J, 2008, 272 PS)	Horst von Saurma	2008	Sport Auto (10/2008)
	8:29	Mercedes-Benz CLK55 AMG (W208)	Horst von Saurma	2000	Sport Auto (05/2000)
	8:29	Renault Megane III RS (Mk III, 2011, 250 PS)	Horst von Saurma	2011	Sport Auto (02/2011), Michelin Pilot Sport Cup.
	8:29	Volkswagen Golf VII GTI Performance (Mk7, pre-facelift, 2013, 2.0 T, 230 PS)	Horst von Saurma	2013	Sport Auto (08/2013), Bridgestone Potenza S001.
	8:30	Alfa Romeo Giulietta QV		2011	al Volante.it (04/2011)
	8:30	Maserati Coupe Cambiocorsa	Horst von Saurma	2002	Sport Auto (10/2002)
	8:32	Ford Fiesta ST Edition (Mk7, B479, 2022, 1.5 T, 200 PS)	Christian Gebhardt	2022	Sport Auto (02/2022), Michelin Pilot Sport 4.
	8:32	Porsche Boxster S (986.1, pre-facelift, 1999, 252 PS)	Horst von Saurma	1999	Sport Auto (12/1999)
	8:32	BMW Z3 M Roadster (E36/7)	Horst von Saurma	1997	Sport Auto (09/1997)
	8:32	BMW Z4 Coupe 3.0si (E86, facelift, 2006, 265 PS)	Horst von Saurma	2006	Sport Auto (08/2006)
	8:32	BMW Z4 Roadster 3.0i SMG (E85, pre-facelift, 2003, 231 PS)	Horst von Saurma	2003	Sport Auto (05/2003)
	8:32	Lotus Exige (Mk2, N/A 1.8, 192 PS)	Horst von Saurma	2004	Sport Auto (08/2004)
	8:33.60	Hyundai i20 N Performance (Mk3, BC3/BI3, 2021, 1.6 T, 204 PS)	Christian Gebhardt	2021-09-01	Sport Auto (10/2021), Pirelli P Zero HN.
	8:33.99	Porsche Cayenne Turbo S (Type 9PA (957), 2009, facelift, 4.8-l, 550 PS))	Patrick Simon	2009-10-02	Evo Magazine News, Dunlop tyres factory test, SUV-class lap time record (before BMW E71 X6 M), Dunlop SP Quatromaxx.
	8:34	BMW Z3 Coupe 3.0 (E36/8, 2001, 231 PS)	Horst von Saurma	2001	Sport Auto (04/2001)
	8:34	Opel Speedster Turbo (2004, 200 PS)	Horst von Saurma	2004	Sport Auto (04/2004)
	8:34	Volkswagen Golf VI R (Mk6, 2010)	Horst von Saurma	2010	Sport Auto (10/2010), Dunlop Sport Maxx GT.
20,832 m	8:34.6	BMW M6 Cabrio (E64, 2007, 507 PS)	Dierk Möller-Sonntag	2007	Auto Bild Sportscars (11/2007), Michelin Pilot Sport 2.
	8:35.00	Ford Focus ST	Patrick Bernhard	2005	Factory claimed.
	8:35	BMW M3 Coupe SMG (E36, facelift, 1997, 321 PS)	Horst von Saurma	1997	Sport Auto (03/1997), Michelin MXX3, S50B32 engine, SMG I automatic.
	8:35	Mini Cooper S JCW (F55/F56/F57, 2015, 2.0 T, 231 PS)	Christian Gebhardt	2015	Sport Auto (12/2015), Kumho sport tyres.
	8:35	Mini Cooper S JCW (R56/R57, 2009, 1.6 T, 211 PS)	Horst von Saurma	2009	Sport Auto (04/2009)
	8:36	BMW Alpina B3 (E46, 1999, 280 PS)	Horst von Saurma	1999	Sport Auto (07/1999)
	8:36	Porsche Boxster (986.2, facelift, 2003, 2.7, 228 PS)	Horst von Saurma	2003	Sport Auto (03/2003)
20,832 m	8:36.1	Mercedes-Benz SL55 AMG (R230, second facelift, 2007, 517 PS)	Dierk Möller-Sonntag	2007	Auto Bild Sportscars (11/2007), Bridgestone Potenza.
	8:37	Maserati 3200 GT	Horst von Saurma	2000	Sport Auto (09/2000)
	8:37	Mercedes-Benz C32 AMG (W203)	Horst von Saurma	2001	Sport Auto (09/2001)
	8:37	Subaru Impreza GT Turbo (GC8G (Mk1, 2000, 218 PS))	Horst von Saurma	2000	Sport Auto (03/2000)
	8:37	Volkswagen Golf IV R32 (Mk4, 2003)	Horst von Saurma	2003	Sport Auto (02/2003)
	8:38	Honda NSX (1 gen, 1997, 280 PS)	Horst von Saurma	1997	Sport Auto (08/1997)
	8:38	Mercedes-Benz SL500 (R230, pre-facelift, 2001, 306 PS)	Horst von Saurma	2001	Sport Auto (12/2001)
	8:38	Renault Megane II Trophy "Sport Auto" Edition (Mk2, 2005, 225 PS)	Horst von Saurma	2005	Sport Auto (06/2005)
	8:38	Volkswagen Golf VI GTI "35 Jähre GTI" (Mk6, 2011, 2.0 T, 235 PS)	Horst von Saurma	2011	Sport Auto (09/2011), Dunlop Sport Maxx GT.
	8:39	Honda S2000	Horst von Saurma	2000	Sport Auto (01/2000)
	8:39	Mazda MAZDASPEED3 (Mazda3 MPS)	Mark Ticehurst	2007	Mazda News (06/2007), Mazda Racing Driver, 10th lap.
	8:39	Morgan Aero 8 (Series 1, pre-facelift, 2003, 286 PS)	Horst von Saurma	2003-03-01	Sport Auto (04/2003), Toyo Proxes R888 R, BMW M62TUB44 engine.
	8:40	Audi TT Coupe (Mk2, 8J, 2007 2.0 TFSI, 200 PS)	Horst von Saurma	2007	Sport Auto (02/2007)
	8:40	Chevrolet Corvette C5	Horst von Saurma	1997	Sport Auto (07/1997), automatic transmission.
	8:40	Opel Corsa OPC (E, X15, 2015, 1.6 T, 207 PS)	Christian Gebhardt	2015	Sport Auto (09/2015) Michelin Pilot Super Sport.
20,832 m	8:40.30	Bentley Continental GT (Mk1, 2006, 560 PS)	Tom Kristensen	2006-03	Auto Bild Sportscars (03/2006), 6-speed Tiptronic automatic.
	8:41	Aston Martin DB7 Vantage	Horst von Saurma	1999	Sport Auto (09/1999)
	8:41	Audi S1 (8X, 2014, 231 PS)	Horst von Saurma	2014	Sport Auto (11/2014), Bridgestone Potenza S001.
	8:41	Audi S3 (8L, 1999, 210 PS)	Horst von Saurma	1999	Sport Auto (06/1999)
	8:42	Audi S4 (B5, 1998, 265 PS)	Horst von Saurma	1998	Sport Auto (08/1998)
	8:42	Audi TT 1.8 T (Mk1, 8N, 1998)	Horst von Saurma	1998	Sport Auto (11/1998), 225 PS version.
	8:42	Lotus Exige (Mk1, 2000, 179 PS)	Horst von Saurma	2000	Sport Auto (11/2000), Sport tyres.
	8:43	Hyundai Genesis Coupe 3.8L	Dmitry Sokolov	2011-07	TopGear Russia (2011), automatic transmission
19,100 m	8:43.3	SEAT León Cupra R Mk1	Øistein Helland	2010-08-07	BTG https://www.youtube.com/watch?v=BGwNecMZrtQ
	8:43.60	Subaru BRZ Final Edition (Mk1, ZN6/ZC6, 2020, N/A 2.0, 200 PS)	Christian Gebhardt	2020-11-19	Sport Auto (12/2020), Michelin Pilot Sport 4.
	8.44.66	Toyota Yaris GRMN (Mk3, XP13, 2019, S/C 1.8, 212 PS)	Christian Gebhardt	2019-04-09	Sport Auto (05/2019), Bridgestone Potenza RE050A.
	8:45	Toyota GT86 (Mk1, ZN6/ZC6, 2012, N/A 2.0, 200 PS)	Horst von Saurma	2013	Sport Auto (02/2013), Bridgestone Potenza.
	8:47	Volkswagen Scirocco 2.0 TSI	Bernt Bråten Andersen	2009-11-15	Minimalt.no
	8:47	Honda Civic Type-R 2.0i LS	Horst von Saurma	2001	Sport Auto (11/2001).
	8:47.99	Opel Corsa OPC	Manuel Reuter	2007	Opel conducted test.
	8:49	Jaguar XKR Coupe (X100, 1998, 363 PS)	Horst von Saurma	1998	Sport Auto (07/1998)
	8:49	Renault Clio V6	Horst von Saurma	2001	Sport Auto (7/2001)
	8:49	Volkswagen Golf V R32 (Mk5, 2006)	Horst von Saurma	2006	Sport Auto (09/2006)
	8:50	BMW Alpina B10 3.2 (E39, 1998, 260 PS)	Horst von Saurma	1998	Sport Auto (04/1998)
	8:50	BMW M3 (E30)	Horst von Saurma	2010	Sport Auto (9/2010)
19,100 m	8:50	Tesla Model S P85D		2015	BTG
	8:51	Alfa Romeo 156 GTA (2002, 250 PS)	Horst von Saurma	2002	Sport Auto (05/2002)
	8:51	Mercedes-Benz C43 AMG (W202)	Horst von Saurma	1998	Sport Auto (02/1998)
	8:52	Mercedes-Benz CLK430 Coupe (W208)	Horst von Saurma	1998	Sport Auto (09/1998)
	8:53	Volkswagen Golf V GTI DSG (Mk5, 2005, 200 PS)	Horst von Saurma	2005	Sport Auto (11/2005), Michelin Pilot Exalto, DSG automatic.
	8:54	Opel Corsa 1.6 Turbo OPC	Horst von Saurma	2008	Sport Auto (04/2008), Continental Conti SportContact.
	8:54	Porsche Boxster (986.1, pre-facelift, 1997, 2.5, 204 PS)	Horst von Saurma	1997	Sport Auto (04/1997)
	8:54	Volkswagen Golf IV GTI "25 Jähre GTI" (Mk4, 2002, 1.8T, 180 PS)	Horst von Saurma	2002	Sport Auto (01/2002)
	8:55	Mini Cooper S JCW (R50/R53, S/C 1.6, 200 PS)	Horst von Saurma	2004	Sport Auto (09/2004)
	8:55	Range Rover Sport Supercharged (2010)	Paul Wijgaertz	2009	Dynamic Adaptive Test - https://www.youtube.com/watch?v=4SYyxYDWtyk
	8:59	Renault Clio IV RS 1.6 16V Turbo EDC (Mk4, 2013)	Horst von Saurma	2013	Sport Auto (10/2013), Dunlop Sport Maxx RT.
	9:02	Chevrolet Cobalt SS Turbo	John Heinricy	2007-10	Wet Track
	9:07	Mercedes-Benz SLK230 Kompressor AMG (R170, 1997, 193 PS)	Horst von Saurma	1997	Sport Auto (05/1997)
	9:09	Fiat Grande Punto Abarth Esseesse (2009, 180 PS)	Horst von Saurma	2009	Sport Auto (03/2009), Pirelli P Zero.
	9:09	Volkswagen Golf IV V6 4motion (Mk4, 2.8, 204 PS)	Horst von Saurma	2000	Sport Auto (04/2000)
19,100 m	9:09	Volkswagen Lupo GTI	Daniel Schwerfeld	2002-09-29	BTG
19,100 m	9:12	Opel Corsa B	Steven Stephan	2020-06-24	BTG
	9:17.120	Ferrari Testarossa		1987	Auto Motor und Sport (17/1987)
20,832 m	9:46.20	Volkswagen Polo GTI (Mk4)	Wolfgang Kaufmann	2007-06-29	Auto Bild Sportscars (07/2007)
20,832 m	11:25.50	Mercedes-Benz G55 AMG (W463)	Wolfgang Kaufmann	2007-06-29	Auto Bild Sportscars (07/2007)
22,800 m	16:01	Trabant P50	Factory team of VEB Sachsenring	1960-04	Production car with 20 bhp during the final stage of the international Hanseat-Rallye.

==== Non-series/non-road-legal ====
Length	Time	Make Model	Power/Weight	Driver	Date	Notes
20,832 m	5:19.546	Porsche 919 Hybrid EVO	720 PS (530 kW; 710 hp) + 440 PS (324 kW; 434 hp) / 849 kg (1,872 lb) dry	Timo Bernhard	2018-06-29	Modified LMP1-h (Le Mans prototype).
20,832 m	6:05.336	Volkswagen ID.R	680 PS (500 kW; 671 hp) / <2,500 lb (1,134 kg)	Romain Dumas	2019-06-03	Average speed of 206.96 km/h. Electric vehicle lap record and lowest energy consumption at 24.7 kWh.
20,832 m	6:15.977	Ford GT Mk IV	811 PS (597 kW; 800 hp) / 3,054 lb (1,385 kg)	Frédéric Vervisch	2026-03-02	Ford conducted test. Unmodified, non-street legal OEM production car. Custom-built for Ford Racing by performance company Multimatic.
20,832 m	6:22.091	Xiaomi SU7 Ultra Prototype	1,548 PS (1,139 kW; 1,527 hp) / 1,900 kg (4,200 lb)	David Pittard	2025-04-01	Xiaomi conducted test. Peak speed 342 km/h. Slicks. Custom-built race car by Xiaomi.
20,832 m	6:24.047	Lotus Evija X	2,011 PS (1,479 kW; 1,983 hp)	Dirk Müller	2023-10-13	One-off based on the production Lotus Evija with rear wing, new dampers, and other modifications. Damp track.
20,600 m	6:40.33	Porsche 911 GT2 RS MR (991.2) by Manthey Racing	700 PS (515 kW; 690 hp) / 1,470 kg (3,240 lb)	Lars Kern	2018-10-25	Street-legal, Michelin Pilot Sport Cup 2 R, OEM "Weissach Package", OEM deletion of audio and communication system, KW Competition 3-way race suspension, larger wing and dive planes, Porsche Motorsport bucket seat and harness on driver's side. Porsche conducted test. 6:44.749 on the 20,832 m lap.
20,832 m	6:40.835	Ford Mustang GTD Competition	826 PS (608 kW; 815 hp)	Dirk Müller	2026-04-17	Official Nürburgring record attempt by Ford. Timing verified by a notary. Unspecified tires. Pre-production model.
20,600 m	6:43.22	McLaren P1 XP1 LM Prototype	1,000 PS (735 kW; 986 hp)	Kenny Bräck	2017-04-27	Modified by Lanzante Motorsport to meet road regulations. Car was without front number plate and therefore not road legal during the run.
20,832 m	6:45.90	NIO EP9	1,360 PS (1,000 kW; 1,341 hp) / 1,735 kg (3,825 lb)	Peter Dumbreck	2017-05-12	NextEV-branded slicks.
20,832 m	6:46.874	Xiaomi SU7 Ultra Prototype	1,548 PS (1,139 kW; 1,527 hp) / 1,900 kg (4,200 lb)	David Pittard	2024-10-28	Xiaomi conducted test. Peak speed 324 km/h. 20% wet surface. Ambient temperature of 10 °C (50 °F). First and only lap tested. Slicks. Custom-built race car by Xiaomi.
20,832 m	6:47.50	Pagani Zonda R	750 PS (552 kW; 740 hp) / 1,070 kg (2,360 lb) Dry	Marc Basseng	2010-06-29	
20,832 m	6:48.393	Ford Transit Supervan 4.2	2,027 PS (1,491 kW; 1,999 hp)	Romain Dumas	2025-08-18	
20,600 m	6:57.578	Subaru WRX STI Type RA NBR Special	600 bhp (447 kW; 608 PS)	Richie Stanaway	2017-07-21	Custom-built race car by Prodrive.
20,832 m	6:58.16	Ferrari 599XX	730 PS (537 kW; 720 hp) / 1,345 kg (2,965 lb) Dry	Raffaele de Simone	2010-04-21	
20,600 m	7:03.06	Dodge Viper ACR-X	640 hp (477 kW; 649 PS) / 1,500 kg (3,300 lb) Dry	Lance Arnold	2012-02	
20,832 m	7:05.12	NIO EP9	1,360 PS (1,000 kW; 1,341 hp) / 1,735 kg (3,825 lb)	Peter Dumbreck	2016-10-14	
20,600 m	7:08.679	Nissan GT-R Nismo	600 PS (441 kW; 592 hp)	Michael Krumm	2013-09-30	Nissan conducted test. 255/40RF-20 run-flat Dunlop SP Sport Maxx GT 600 DSST. Pre-production Nismo "N Attack Package" (including removal of rear seats, alterations of front seats, engine, powertrain, suspension, brakes, aerodynamic parts). six-point harness and carbon fibre bonnet gurney making the car not road legal.
20,600 m	7:09.59	Porsche 911 GT3 RS MR (991.1) by Manthey Racing	500 PS (368 kW; 493 hp) / 1,420 kg (3,130 lb)	Christian Gebhardt	2017	Observed in Sport Auto (09/2017). Street-legal, Michelin Pilot Sport Cup 2 N0, magnesium wheels, KW Competition 3-way race suspension, 911 R diffusor.
20,600 m	7:15.63	Porsche 911 GT2 (996) by Edo Competition	670 hp (500 kW)	Patrick Simon	2005-08-04	Vehicle was tuned to produce 670 bhp and 880Nm Torque.
20,832 m	7:20.143	Lynk & Co 03 Cyan Concept	528 hp (394 kW) / 1,287 kg (2,837 lb)	Thed Björk	2019-08-19	Michelin Pilot Sport Cup 2 285/30R20.
20,832 m	7:22:00	Mygale M12-SJ-Ford Ecoboost	205 PS (151 kW; 202 hp) / 465 kg (1,025 lb)	Nick Tandy	2012-09-04	Technical info of chassis. Car is a series produced Formula Ford racer converted for road use that including the addition of registration plates, wheel covers, front and rear lights, revised wing mirrors and a horn. The car was driven on road-legal tyres. Ford conducted test.
20,832 m	7:22.329	Toyota TMG EV P002	469 hp (350 kW)	Jochen Krumbach	2012-10-02	Toyota Motorsport GmbH conducted test.
20,600 m	7:22:80	BMW M3 CSL (E46) by Loaded	540 PS (397 kW; 533 hp) / 1,385 kg (3,053 lb)	Richard Göransson	2007-11-11	Time was set on a non-exclusive public track day with other cars present. Car has been modified by Loaded to include a custom supercharger that puts out 180 PS (132 kW; 178 hp) more than the stock car's 360 PS (265 kW; 355 hp) 3.2L inline 6 BMW S54 engine. Car is road legal outside of North America.
20,832 m	7:25.231	Tesla Model S Plaid Track Package		Tom Schwister	2023-06-02	Official lap time in the modified electric vehicles category. Tesla Model S Plaid with OEM Track Pack.
20,600 m	7:29.5	BMW M5 (F90) by AC Schnitzer	700 bhp (522 kW; 710 PS)	Jörg Müller	2018-08-22	
	7:43.8	Honda Civic Type R (FK8)			2017-04	Honda conducted test, full "floating" roll cage, removed infotainment and rear seats. FWD car record (before Renault Mégane R.S. Trophy-R)
	7:47.794	TMG EV P001	380 bhp (283 kW; 385 PS)	Jochen Krumbach	2011-08	
	7:46	Jaguar XJ220 Prototype		John Nielsen	1991	Car wasn't road legal. A manual stopwatch in a promotional video by Jaguar was shown displaying this time. Not independently verified.
20,832 m	7:49	Toyota Supra	606 bhp (452 kW; 614 PS)	Herbert Schürg	1997	Refer to link for modification details. Modified by Japanese automotive accessory company Blitz, it was claimed to be capable of 750 PS (552 kW; 740 hp) but ran on 606 bhp (452 kW; 614 PS) when time was recorded.
20,832 m	7:50	BMW X5 (E53) LM	700 bhp (522 kW; 710 PS), 531 lb⋅ft (720 N⋅m)	Hans-Joachim Stuck	2000	Evo (08/2005). BMW M70 S70B56 engine from a V12 LMR.
20,600 m	7:50.63	Honda Civic Type R Prototype			2014-05	Honda conducted test, development car with technical specifications representative of the final production car. Air conditioning, front passenger seat and audio equipment removed, full roll cage added. FWD car record, video confirmed.
20,832 m	7:55	Subaru Impreza WRX STi Sedan (2011) Prototype	320 bhp (239 kW; 324 PS)	Tommi Mäkinen	2010-04-16	Subaru conducted test. MY2011 prototype with non-production upgrades and modifications. Subaru EJ207 engine from a 2010 JDM Subaru Impreza WRX STi R205 with larger turbo. Video confirmed.
20,600 m	8:01.72	Nissan Skyline GT-R R33		Motoharu Kurosawa	1995	Best Motoring - Video Special DVD Series, Prototype (weight/horsepower different from production car)
20,832 m	8:15	BMW Z4 M Coupe Prototype	252 kW (343 PS; 338 hp)		2006	Evo (07/2006). "The steering rate is higher, too, while spring, damper and roll bars are all tuned specifically for the Coupe, much of the development work, predictably, having been conducted at the Nürburgring-Nordschleife. Equally predictably, we can't resist asking what its lap time is and Richter (Gerhard Richter, director of M GmbH) reveals that it's 8min 15sec but adds that the time was set with a development car rather than the final, optimum, production-ready car. Surprisingly, that's only three seconds faster than the M Roadster..."
20,832 m	8:18	BMW Z4 M Roadster Prototype	252 kW (343 PS; 338 hp)		2006	
20,600 m	8:19.8	BMW i8 by AC Schnitzer	170 kW (231 PS; 228 hp) + 96 kW (131 PS; 129 hp) / 1,560 kg (3,440 lb)	Markus Oestreich	2017	Bodykit with wing, 21" wheels, wider tyres, lowered suspension.
20,832 m	8:42.72	Electric Raceabout	300 kW (402 hp) / 1,720 kg (3,790 lb) Dry	Ralf Kelleners	2011-09	Electric RaceAbout of Finland is road legal and registered prototype battery electric vehicle. Test was run by Helsinki Metropolia University of Applied Sciences using Nokian Z G2 high performance road tyres. Time will also be verified and published by Sport Auto.
20,832 m	8:56.81	Chery Riich G5 2.0T		Dirk Schoysman	2009-10-13	Chery conducted test. This modified car differs from the production model with added roll-cage, stripped out interior, upgraded brakes, rims and tyres. Not clear whether the engine had been tuned. Chery claimed that they have been the first Chinese auto maker that 'Conquered the Nürburgring (中国首驱，征服纽博格林！)'.
19,100 m	9:12	Jaguar S-Type Diesel		Sabine Schmitz	2004-11-21	Jeremy Clarkson was set a challenge to get a Jaguar S-Type 2.7 Diesel round the 'ring in under 10 minutes, and after getting shown around and getting advice from Sabine Schmitz, and quite a few attempts, he managed a 9:59. Sabine completed the lap in the same car as Clarkson on her first try in 9:12.
20,832 m	9:52	Mini E racer, Electric		Thomas Jäger	2010-04	This was the first time under ten minutes recorded by an electric car.
19,100 m	10:08.49	Ford Transit		Sabine Schmitz		After telling Jeremy Clarkson that she could do his lap time in a van, Schmitz was set the same challenge as Clarkson, but in a Ford Transit. Vehicle had several parts removed and the draft vehicle in front of it.

==== Competition ====
General Note: International motorsport sanctioning bodies used the 20,832 m Nordschleife variant in 1983 only.

===== Qualifying =====
Length	Time	Make Model	Class	Driver	Date	Source	Notes
20,832 m	6:11.13	Porsche 956	Gr. C	Stefan Bellof	1983-05-28		Pole-position for 1983 1000k Sports Car race
20,832 m	6:16.85	Porsche 956	Gr. C	Jochen Mass	1983-05-28		Pole-position for 1983 1000k Sports Car race
22,835 m	6:58.6	Ferrari 312T	F1	Niki Lauda	1975-08-02		Pole-position for 1975 German Grand Prix. During unofficial practice in 1974 Lauda drove 6:58.2 in a Ferrari 312B3.
22,835 m	7:06.5	McLaren M23–Ford	F1	James Hunt	1976-07-31		Pole-position for 1976 German Grand Prix
22,835 m	7:08.59	Ford Capri Zakspeed Turbo	Gr. 5	Klaus Niedzwiedz	1982-07-04		Pole-pos Großer Preis der Tourenwagen
22,835 m	7:30.52	Ford Capri Zakspeed Turbo	Gr. 5	Klaus Ludwig	1980-03-30		Pole-position for 1980 DRM race
22,835 m	7:31.7	Porsche 935 K3	Gr. 5	Klaus Ludwig	1979-04-29		Pole-position for 1979 Eifelrennen, DRM race
22,835 m	7:34.30	Porsche 917/10	Interserie	Emerson Fittipaldi	1974-06-16		1974 Goodyear-Pokal, 300-Kilometer-Rennen, Interserie, European Championship for Touring Cars
22,835 m	7:44.4	Ford Capri Zakspeed Turbo	Gr. 5	Hans Heyer	1979-04-29		Fastest Category II car of 1979 Eifelrennen, DRM race
22,835 m	7:45.44	BMW 320 Turbo	Gr. 5	Hans-Joachim Stuck	1980-03-30		Fastest Category II car of 1980 Eifelrennen, DRM race
22,835 m	7:42.1	Brabham BT26A-Ford	F1	Jacky Ickx	1969-08-03		pole 1969 German GP, fastest on original bumpy track
20,832 m	7:56.0	Jaguar XJS	Gr. A	Tom Walkinshaw	1983-07-09		Pole Großer Preis der Tourenwagen, European Touring Car Championship race
24,368 m	7:57.474	Audi R8 LMS Ultra	SP9 GT3	Marc Basseng/Frank Stippler	2014-09-30		Average speed 183.651 km/h. Pole position for 2014 VLN 37. RCM DMV Grenzlandrennen. Fastest qualifying lap on current Nürburgring VLN layout.
25,378 m	8:09.058	Mercedes-AMG GT3 Evo	SP9 GT3	Raffaele Marciello	2023-05-19		Average speed 186.810 km/h. Pole position for 2023 24 Hours Nürburgring race. Fastest qualifying lap on current Nürburgring 24h layout.
25,378 m	8:09.105	Porsche 911 GT3 R (991)	SP9 GT3	Laurens Vanthoor	2018-05-11		Average speed 186.792 km/h. Pole position for 2018 24 Hours Nürburgring race. Onboard video.
25,378 m	8:10.921	McLaren MP4-12C GT3	SP9 GT3	Kévin Estre	2014-06-20		Average speed 186.101 km/h. Pole position for 2014 24 Hours Nürburgring race. Video confirmed.
22,810 m	9:43.1	Mercedes-Benz W154	GP	Hermann Lang	1938-07-24	n/a	Pole-position for 1939 German Grand Prix
22,810 m	9:48.4	Mercedes-Benz W154	GP	Manfred von Brauchitsch	1939-07-23	n/a	Pole-position for 1938 German Grand Prix

===== Racing =====
Length	Time	Make Model	Class	Driver	Date	Source	Notes
20,832 m	6:25.91	Porsche 956	Gr. C	Stefan Bellof	1983-05-29		1983 1000 km Nürburgring (did not finish (accident))
20,832 m	6:28.03	March Engineering 832-BMW	F2	Christian Danner	1983-04-24		1983 Eifelrennen (193.272 km/h)
20,832 m	6:58	Porsche 997 Turbo	Gr. A/GT	Jürgen Alzen	2009-09-05		BMW Driving Experience Challenge "Rhein-Ruhr" 2009
20,832 m	7:04	Porsche 996 Turbo	Gr. A/GT	Uwe Alzen	2003-05-29		Castrol-Haugg-Cup 2003
22,835 m	7:06.4	Ferrari 312T	F1	Clay Regazzoni	1975-08-03		1975 German Grand Prix
22,835 m	7:06.51	Maurer MM82-BMW	F2	Stefan Bellof	1982-04-25		F2 lap record in 1982 Eifelrennen
22,835 m	7:10.8	Tyrrell P34–Ford	F1	Jody Scheckter	1976-08-01		1976 German Grand Prix
22,835 m	7:37.3	Porsche 935 K3	Gr. 5	Klaus Ludwig	1979-04-29		1979 Eifelrennen, DRM race (179.760 km/h)
22,835 m	7:46.3	Zakspeed Capri Turbo	Gr. 5	Hans Heyer	1979-04-29		1979 Eifelrennen, DRM race (176.290 km/h)
22,835 m	7:56.21	Zakspeed Capri Turbo	Gr. 5	Harald Ertl	1980-03-30		1980 DRM race (172.630 km/h)
22,835 m	7:43.8	Brabham BT26A-Ford	F1	Jacky Ickx	1969-08-03		1969 German GP, lap record of original bumpy track with no safety features
24,369 m	7:59.045	BMW Z4 GT3	SP9 GT3	Jens Klingmann	2014-08-02		VLN 37. RCM DMV Grenzlandrennen (183.049 km/h)
20,832 m	8:02.44	Jaguar XJS	Gr. A	Tom Walkinshaw	1983-07-10		1983 Großer Preis der Tourenwagen (155.449 km/h) (did not finish (gearbox))
24,433 m	8:09.949	Porsche 996 Turbo	Gr. A/GT	Uwe Alzen/Jürgen Alzen	2005-09-24		VLN 2005
25,378 m	8:17.340	Porsche 911 GT3 R (991)	SP9 GT3	Nick Tandy	2018-05-13		24 Hours Nürburgring 2018, Lap 30 (183.699 km/h).
25,378 m	8:19.607	McLaren MP4-12C GT3	SP9 GT3	Kévin Estre/Peter Kox/Tim Mullen/Sascha Bert	2014-06-21		24 Hours Nürburgring 2014, Lap 38 (182.865 km/h)
25,359 m	8:22.088	BMW Z4 GT3	SP9 GT3	Maxime Martin/Andrea Piccini/Yelmer Buurman/Richard Göransson	2013-05-20		24 Hours Nürburgring 2013, Lap 84 driven by Maxime Martin, video confirmed
25,359 m	8:36.768	Porsche 997 GT3-RSR	SP7	Timo Bernhard/Marc Lieb/Romain Dumas/Marcel Tiemann	2009-05-25		24 Hours Nürburgring 2009, Lap 99, new distance record with 155 laps
25,378 m	8:43.367	Porsche 996 GT3-MR	Gr. A/GT	Lucas Luhr/Timo Bernhard/Mike Rockenfeller/ Marcel Tiemann	2006-06-18		24 Hours Nürburgring 2006
25,947 m	9:02.206	Dodge Viper GTS-R	GT2/24h	Peter Zakowski/Pedro Lamy/Robert Lechner	2003-06-01		24 Hours Nürburgring 2003. Team DQ'd for fuel tank size
22,810 m	10:09.1	Mercedes-Benz W154	GP	Richard Seaman	1938-07-24	n/a	1938 German Grand Prix
22,810 m	10:24.2	Mercedes-Benz W154	GP	Rudolf Caracciola	1939-07-23	n/a	1939 German Grand Prix

=== Motorcycles ===
==== Racing ====
Length	Time	Make Model	Rider	Date	Source	Notes
20,832 m	7:49.71	Honda RC30	Helmut Dähne	1993-05-23		As motorcycle contests were discontinued after 1994, this remains the fastest officially timed motorcycle lap ever on the 20,832 m variant (159.7 km/h). Done in a single lap time trial run during Zuverlässigkeitsfahrt series on road legal VFR750R RC30 and Metzeler ME Z1 tyres.
22,835 m	8:22.2	Suzuki 500	Marco Lucchinelli	1980-08-24		1980 German motorcycle Grand Prix (163.6 km/h), fastest motorcycle lap ever on 22,835 m variant, last Grand Prix motorcycle racing event held there

Length	Time	Make Model	Rider	Date	Source	Notes
19,100 m	7:10.0	Yamaha YZF-R1	Andy "AndyPath" Carlile	n/a		Bridge to Gantry time set during touristenfahrten.
19,100 m	7:17.0	P3 Suzuki GSX-R600K7	Andy "AndyPath" Carlile	n/a	Fast Bikes Magazine March 2009	Road legal project. Built by Richard Vanags at P3 Unlimited for Fast Bikes Magazine. Based on a Suzuki GSXR 600K7.
19,100 m	7:21.8	MV Agusta F4 R 312	Andy "AndyPath" Carlile	2007-10-15	Performance Bikes Magazine January 2008	n/a
19,100 m	7:28.8	Yamaha YZF-R1	"The Baron"	n/a	Performance Bikes Magazine October 2007	n/a
	7:32.1	Yamaha YZF-R1	Brendan Keirle	n/a	Sliders Guest House video lap August 2006	n/a
	7:32.6	Aprilia RSV1000R Factory	"The Baron"	n/a	Reported in PB Magazine August 2007	n/a
	7:35.7	Suzuki GSX-R1000K7	Dale Lomas (Ex-Roadtest Editor of Performance Bikes Magazine)	n/a		n/a
	7:50	Suzuki GSX-R1000 vs Aprilia RSV1000R	Fausto "Faustone" Severi & Helmut Dähne	2002		During a SuperWheels's Pattuglia Acrobatica test

Length	Time	Make Model	Rider	Date	Source	Notes
20,832 m	7:46.70	Suzuki GSXR 1000	Tim Rothig	2008-05		
20,832 m	7:50	Kawasaki ZX-10R (2011)	Tim Rothig	2011-09	Bridgestone Battlax R10.	

=== Bicycles ===
==== Rad am Ring Time Trial (22 km) ====
Category	Time	Rider	Event, Notes
Men's	31:11.17	Victor de la Parte	Winner 22 km-Zeitfahren, Rad&Run am Ring 2015
Men's	31:43.28	Patrick Schelling	Winner 22 km-Zeitfahren, Rad am Ring 2016
Men's	32:43.36	Manuel Bosch	Winner 22 km-Zeitfahren, Rad am Ring 2017
Men's	33:08.00	Karl Platt	Winner 22 km-Zeitfahren, Rad am Ring 2019
Men's	34:47.00	Christian Bundschuh	Winner 22 km-Zeitfahren, Rad am Ring 2018
Women's	38:00.00	Lisa Brömmel	Winner 22 km-Zeitfahren, Rad am Ring 2019
Women's	38:34.00	Lisa Brömmel	Winner 22 km-Zeitfahren, Rad am Ring 2018
Women's	39:44.55	Tatjana Paller	Winner 22 km-Zeitfahren, Rad am Ring 2016
Women's	39:57.37	Bianca Lust	Winner 22 km-Zeitfahren, Rad am Ring 2017
Women's	41:18.87	Gudrun Stock	Winner 22 km-Zeitfahren, Rad&Run am Ring 2015

== See also ==
- List of Nordschleife lap times (racing)
