= Motorcycle Mechanics (magazine) =

British motorcycle magazine

- The first issue, April 1959
- Staff writers: John Robinson from 1968, mostly as Technical Editor
- Categories: Motorcycles
- Publisher: Mercury House Publications 1959–1974; EMAP 1974–1983
- Founded: 1959
- First issue: 1959 April
- Final issue: 1983 March
- Country: Great Britain
- Language: English

Motorcycle Mechanics (Motorcycle, Scooter and Three-Wheeler Mechanics, also known as MM) was a British monthly magazine founded in 1959 under Mercury House Publications. With the strapline "The illustrated how-to-do-it magazine", it initially concentrated on the practicalities of owning motorcycles as a domestic form of transport with a focus on home maintenance and repairs.

Published between 1959 and 1983, many copies carried the announcements: World's largest sale and Largest sale. When founding-editor Robert F Webb moved on in early 1962, successor editor Charles E Deane's message in June 1962 proudly proclaimed that, in three years from a new start, they had achieved the world's largest net sale of any motorcycle magazine.

As with other motorcycling periodicals, MM moved with the times, changing its name and format to suit readership requirements and fashion and technology advancements, along with a change of ownership in 1974.

In 1972 the masthead was reformatted to Motor Cycle Mechanics (MCM), then reverted to Motorcycle Mechanics, followed by a brief spell as Mechanics & The Biker when it joined with sister publication The Biker.

In 1982 it became known as simply Mechanics, with the final edition in March 1983, from when it became known by the title of Performance Bikes which initially carried the cover-masthead Performance Bikes & Mechanics.

The publication had a long association with the journalist John Robinson, who had been with the magazine from 1968, then with Performance Bikes until his death in 2001.
