= Horst von Saurma =

German journalist and racing driver

Horst von Saurma-Jeltsch (born Horst Vieselmann, 28 August 1954) is the former chief editor of the German automobile magazine Sport auto until February 2013. He also had a brief racing career but is best known for skillful driving at the Nürburgring.

Saurma participated in the 1985 TT-F1 race on the Isle of Man and finished in 25th position.

== Supertests ==
A well-known feature of Sport Auto is the "Supertest", wherein Saurma tests sports cars at their limit on the track (using fully road-legal trim) and their resulting lap times at the Nürburgring and the Hockenheimring are compared. In 2004, Saurma set the Nürburgring lap record for a production car by taking the Porsche Carrera GT around in 7 minutes 32 seconds. Saurma's laps for Sport Auto are often taken as benchmark times for their respective vehicles. Saurma continues the "Supertests" as a freelance author, after having resigned as chief editor.

== See also ==
- Nordschleife fastest lap times
