= Performance Bikes (magazine) =

Monthly British motorcycling magazine

Performance Bikes (PB)
- The first issue, April 1985
- Editor: Chris Newbigging
- Former editors: Matt Wildee, Tim Thompson, Dave Calderwood
- Categories: Motorcycling
- Frequency: Monthly
- Publisher: EMAP National Publications Ltd; Bauer Consumer Media Ltd
- First issue: April 1985
- Country: United Kingdom
- Based in: Peterborough, England
- Language: English
- Website: Practical Sports Bike
- ISSN: 0268-4942

Performance Bikes, often known by the shortened form of "PB", was a monthly British motorcycling magazine which evolved during the 1980s from the long-running Motorcycle Mechanics. The first issue dated April 1985 and entitled Performance Bikes & Mechanics published by EMAP also incorporated the previous version of the title Mechanics and The Biker.

The magazine featured a mix of motorcycle and product tests, with technical articles and design innovation, presented with a unique combination of humour and high standards. Many of the journalists raced competitively, for example, applying this experience and perspective in the magazine's tests and reviews; one racer's preferred road bike, a VFR, being derided by others as "an old man's machine", the next cover featured as his riposte him riding it at extreme speed through a countryside sweeper, knee-down, dressed in dressing-gown, pipe and slippers.

In 2007, PB under publisher Bauer moved testing of many of the motorcycles to the Nürburgring, in the Eifel Mountains of Germany. Where the Nordschleife fastest lap times are captured and collated into a table. This feature is called the PBTT, which stands for Performance Bikes Test Track.

PB is notable for its long association with the late journalist John Robinson ("Robbo", who had been with the magazine since its Motorcycle Mechanics days until his death in 2001, and was noted for communicating complex technical issues simply, understandably, and memorably). Robinson was key to PB pioneering the use of a dynamometer in the performance testing of motorcycles by a magazine.

Performance Bike was amalgamated with another Bauer magazine and continues under the name Practical Sportsbikes.
