= Autozeitung =

German automobile magazine

- Categories: Automobile magazine
- Frequency: Biweekly
- Publisher: Heinrich Bauer Verlag
- First issue: 1969; 57 years ago
- Company: Bauer Media Group
- Country: Germany
- Based in: Cologne
- Language: German
- Website: Autozeitung
- ISSN: 0171-8452

Autozeitung or Auto Zeitung (German: "Automobile Newspaper") is a German-language biweekly automobile enthusiast magazine. It is headquartered in Cologne, Germany.

== History and profile ==
Autozeitung was established in 1969. The magazine is part of the Bauer Media Group and is published by Heinrich Bauer Verlag on a biweekly basis on Wednesdays. The headquarters of the magazine is in Cologne. Its target audience includes men aged 20–49. The magazine features articles about automotive innovations, automotive industry, formula racing, among the others. It has offered annual Auto Trophy awards since 1988.

The circulation of Autozeitung was 204,547 copies during the period of 2010-2011.

== See also ==
- List of magazines in Germany
