= Best Motoring =

Japanese automobile magazine

- Categories: Automobile magazine
- Frequency: Monthly
- Publisher: Kodansha
- Founded: 1987
- Final issue: June 2011
- Country: Japan
- Language: Japanese
- Website: www.hot-version.jp

Hot Version
- Categories: Automobile magazine
- Frequency: Bi-monthly
- Publisher: Kodansha
- Founded: 1991
- Final issue: June 2019
- Country: Japan
- Language: Japanese
- Website: www.hot-version.jp

Best Motoring (ベストモータリング, Besuto Mōtaringu) was Japan's preeminent automobile magazine, video, and DVD series, before becoming a web video series. Alongside Best Motoring, there were Hot Version and Video Option.

== History ==
With the first edition debuting in 1987 and the last in June 2011, the videos were marked by non traditional races and challenges such as Tōge battles, in which one car tries to outrun another on a twisty mountain pass. The drivers were the premier racers of the various Japanese racing series, including JGTC (now Super GT), the D1 Grand Prix, and Formula Nippon. Some of the regular hosts/drivers included the "Drift King" Keiichi Tsuchiya, Motoharu Kurosawa, Manabu Orido, Nobuteru Taniguchi, Juichi Wakisaka, Akihiko Nakaya, and Naoki Hattori.

Best Motoring, and Hot Version were all produced by Kodansha/2&4 Motoring.

The Japanese version of Best Motoring was a monthly video series covering mainly non-tuned factory cars, whereas Hot Version (ホットバージョン) was the bi-monthly video series testing mainly tuned cars. Video Option was yet another video series that was released irregularly and usually focused on a particular car model or topic (racer's background, driving techniques).

The final issue were released in April 2011. However, Hot Version would make its return shortly after being cancelled, due to popular demand. Best Motoring's attempted revival (now called Best Motor TV) now only airs 2-3 installments per year with their first new issue airing in Japan in December 2011. Since 2016, Best Motoring has been moved to YouTube where they release new videos indefinitely.

Other spinoffs series included quarter-yearly Racing History, released in 2005, was dedicated to the historical aspect of Japanese motorsport.

== Best Motoring International ==
In April 2000, Taro Koki, Masa Kuji, and Katsu Takahashi co-founded Zigzag Asia and took international distribution rights for Best Motoring, creating Best Motoring International (BMI).

Best Motoring International was an English compilation of various video clips from all three of the Japanese video magazines, Best Motoring, Hot Version and Video Option.

Initial releases were dubbed entirely in English, and some might say suffered from poor voice acting/editing. From volume 3 onwards they settled on having an English narrator and retained the original Japanese audio for the presenters, using subtitles for translation instead of dubbing, and localizing graphics in English. International automotive editor Sam Mitani has also appeared on the series. Post production for most of the series was done by Dogma Studios, with Brian Alvarez doing the editing, graphics and some of the audio mixing.

The other differences between the two are that the English version did not refer its series by volume number.
