= TMG EV P001 =

Overview
- Manufacturer: Toyota Motorsport GmbH
- Assembly: Cologne, Germany

Body and chassis
- Class: Sports car
- Body style: 0 door roadster
- Layout: Rear mid-engine, Rear-wheel drive
- Platform: Radical chassis

Powertrain
- Electric motor: two EVO Electric permanent magnet synchronous motors, combined 280 kW (380 hp) and 800 N⋅m (590 lbf⋅ft)
- Battery: 41.5 kW·h lithium-ceramic

Dimensions
- Wheelbase: 2,368 mm (93.2 in)
- Length: 4,190 mm (165 in)
- Width: 1,785 mm (70.3 in)
- Height: 1,550 mm (61 in)
- Curb weight: 970 kg (2,140 lb)

The TMG EV P001 is a road-legal electric vehicle developed by Toyota Motorsport GmbH. It is based on a Radical chassis as modified for e-Wolf, with two EVO Electric axial flux motors powered by a 350 kg (772 lb) lithium-ceramic battery pack. It was developed originally for a customer in 2010. TMG's performance claims include a top speed of 260 km/h (162 mph), 0–50 km/h (31 mph) in 1.8 seconds, and 0–100 km/h (62 mph) in 3.9 seconds.

In August 2011, driven by Jochen Krumbach, it set a new lap record for an electric vehicle at the Nürburgring Nordschleife of 7mins 47.794secs.

== See also ==
- Toyota TS030 Hybrid
