= Toyota TS030 Hybrid =

Le Mans Prototype 1 (LMP1) sports car

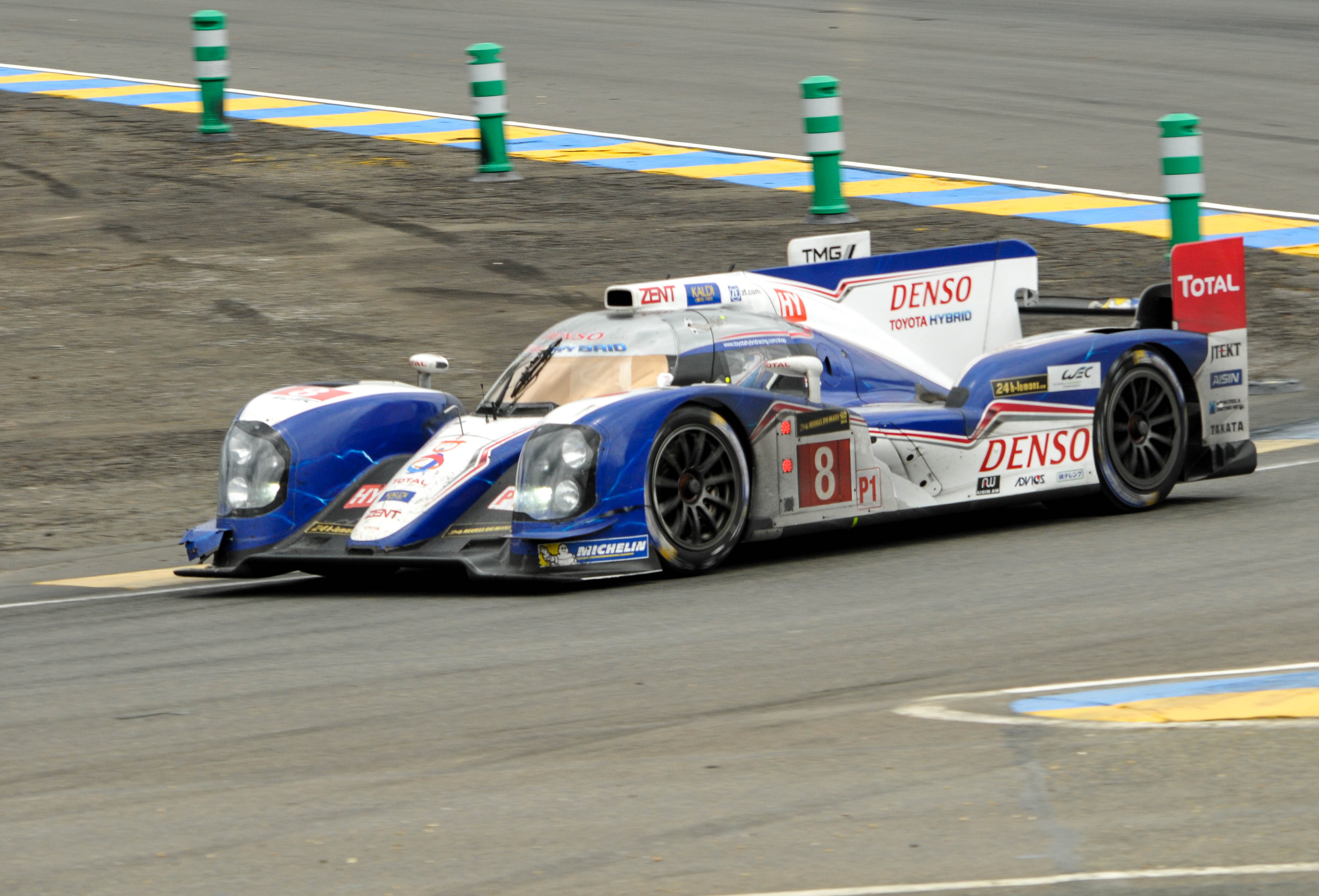
- Anthony Davidson in the TS030 at the 2013 24 Hours of Le Mans
- Category: Le Mans Prototype 1 (LMP1)
- Constructor: Toyota
- Designer: Pascal Vasselon
- Predecessor: Toyota GT-One
- Successor: Toyota TS040 Hybrid

Technical specifications
- Chassis: Carbon fibre and aluminium honeycomb monocoque
- Suspension (front): Independent double wishbone pushrod system
- Suspension (rear): Independent double wishbone pushrod system
- Length: 4,650 mm (183.1 in)
- Width: 2,000 mm (78.7 in)
- Height: 1,030 mm (40.6 in)
- Engine: Toyota RV8KLM 3.4 L (3,400 cc) 90-degree V8 Normally aspirated mid, longitudinally mounted
- Transmission: 6-speed sequential manual Viscous mechanical locking differential
- Fuel: Total petrol
- Brakes: Dual circuit hydraulic braking system, mono-block light-alloy brake callipers front and rear, ventilated front and rear brake discs in carbon
- Tyres: Michelin radial 36/71-18 front, 37/71-18 rear
- Clutch: Multidisc

Competition history
- Notable entrants: (Japan) Toyota Racing
- Notable drivers: (Switzerland) Sébastien Buemi; (United Kingdom) Anthony Davidson; (Japan) Kazuki Nakajima; (France) Nicolas Lapierre; (Austria) Alexander Wurz; (France) Stéphane Sarrazin; (Italy) Andrea Caldarelli
- Debut: 2012 24 Hours of Le Mans
- First win: 2012 6 Hours of São Paulo
- Last win: 2013 6 Hours of Bahrain
- Last event: 2013 6 Hours of Bahrain
Races	Wins	Podiums	Poles	F/Laps
14	5	10	6	4
- Constructors' Championships: 0
- Drivers' Championships: 0

The Toyota TS030 Hybrid is a Le Mans Prototype 1 (LMP1) sports car built by Toyota Motorsport GmbH and used by the manufacturer in the FIA World Endurance Championship in 2012 and 2013. It was Toyota's first all new prototype since the GT-One last competed in 1999, and was the first petrol-hybrid engine car to participate in the World Endurance Championship. Work on designing the car began in late 2010 when early chassis designs were presented to Toyota Motorsport. The project was stopped briefly after the 2011 Tōhoku earthquake and tsunami, but the car's building was approved six months later. The TS030 Hybrid featured a Kinetic energy recovery system (KERS) regenerative braking device to charge a super capacitor. Its engine, a naturally aspirated petrol 3.4-litre (210 cu in) V8 power unit, was mounted at a 90-degree angle, produced 530 horsepower (400 kW; 540 PS), and was based on Toyota's Super GT project.

On 24 January 2012 the TS030 Hybrid was shown to the press for the first time at Circuit Paul Ricard and the team commenced testing at the track shortly after. Its planned debut at the 2012 6 Hours of Spa-Francorchamps was delayed while the car's chassis was rebuilt after a heavy testing crash. Two TS030 Hybrid cars were entered for Le Mans which saw the team fail to finish because of a sizeable accident by Anthony Davidson in the No. 8 vehicle, and an engine failure for the sister No. 7 entry. After the race, the company fielded a sole TS030 Hybrid for the rest of the season and attracted attention for an innovative rear wing extension. It was able to compete successfully against the two Audi R18 e-tron quattro cars, securing three victories with drivers Nicolas Lapierre and Alexander Wurz, ending the season second to their rivals in the World Manufacturers' Championship.

Further car development was undertaken to minimise the impact of the 2013 LMP1 technical regulations by focusing on engine fine-tuning for improvements in power, efficiency and reliability. Only one TS030 Hybrid was entered for the entire 2013 World Endurance Championship because Toyota had limited resources, though a second car was used in selected races. The 2012-specification chassis was used in the season's first two races with the updated 2013 chassis debuting at Spa-Francorchamps. The TS030 Hybrid cars won two of the eight rounds contested in the season with a second-place finish for the No. 8 vehicle at the 24 Hours of Le Mans. Toyota again finished second behind their rivals Audi in the Manufacturers' Championship. The 2014 LMP1 regulations rendered the TS030 Hybrid obsolete, and it was superseded by the TS040 Hybrid.

== Background ==
Prior to the development of the TS030 Hybrid, Toyota last competed in sports car racing in 1999. That year their cars, called GT-Ones, qualified on pole position for the 24 Hours of Le Mans. All three cars ran quickly for most of the race although two retired from tyre issues, while the remaining GT-One finished in second place behind race winners BMW. The company chose to withdraw from sports car racing at the end of the year to concentrate their efforts on establishing their Formula One team. After the Hybrid GT500 Toyota Supra HV-R won the Tokachi 24 Hours outright in 2007, Toyota sought a larger and more international audience for acknowledgement of the company's work in hybrid racing technology. Engineers set themselves the objective of developing a purpose-built car to return to international endurance racing, and garner worldwide interest by competing in the 24 Hours of Le Mans.

== Design and development ==
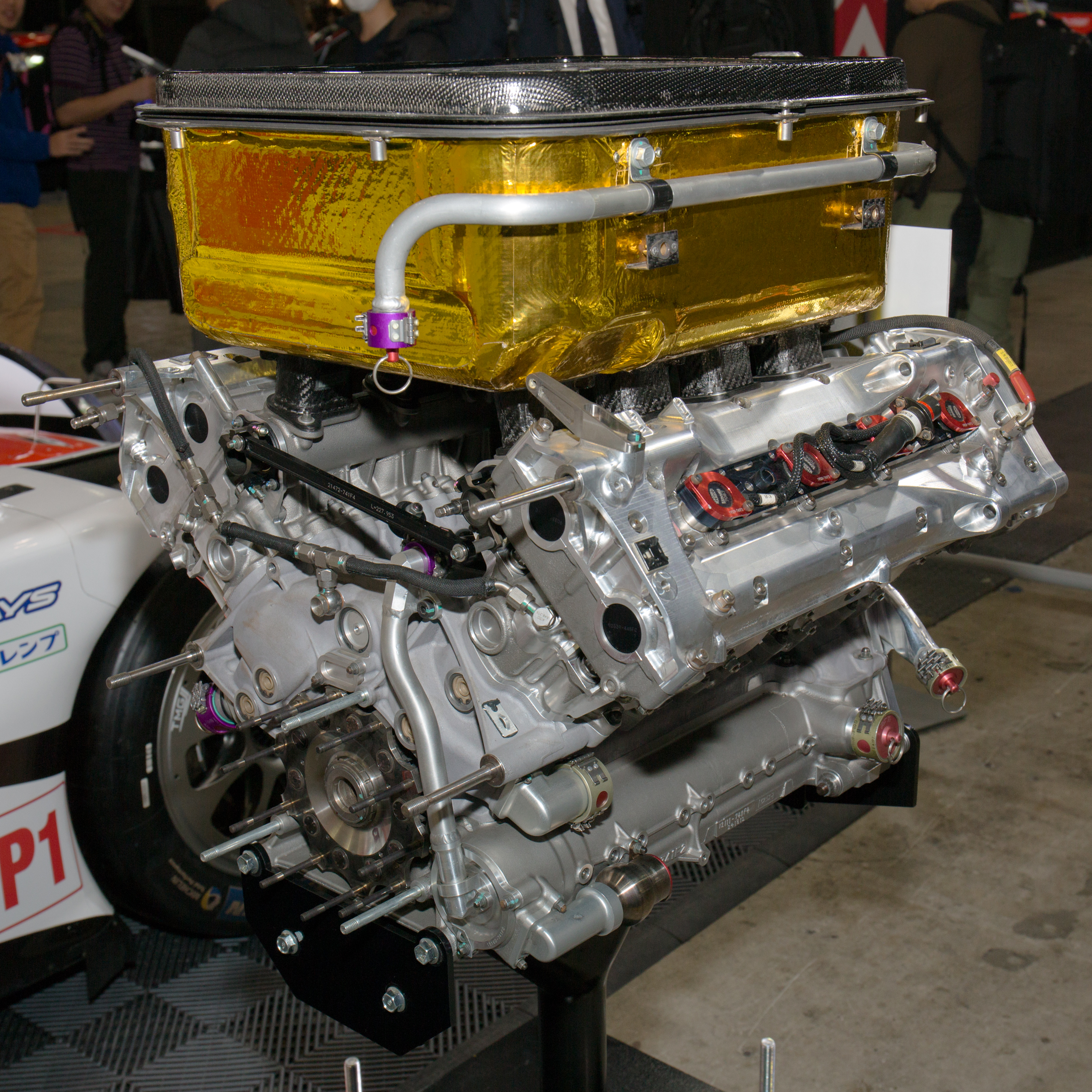
The engine of the 2012 Toyota TS030 Hybrid on display at the 2017 Tokyo Auto Salon

Work on designing the car began in late 2010 when early designs of its chassis were presented to Toyota Motorsport. The project was halted briefly after the earthquake and tsunami that struck Japan in March 2011 although the building of the car was approved six months later. The carbon fibre monocoque was constructed at Toyota Motorsport's headquarters in Cologne which built 84% of the chassis, and performed aerodynamic development of the design in its wind tunnel. Designers were influenced by findings from outdated Dome chassis and impressions from current Audi and Peugeot monocoques. The suspension setup consisted of an independent double wishbone system with pushrod actuated dampers, and was designed to accommodate wide tyres. Its engine, a naturally aspirated petrol 3.4-litre (210 cu in) V8 power unit, was mounted at a 90-degree angle, and produced 530 horsepower (400 kW; 540 PS). Toyota engineers elected to base the engine on their Super GT project instead of constructing a new one. The six-speed sequential gearbox unit was transverse-mounted to the engine and the brakes were constructed from carbon materials.

The TS030 Hybrid featured a Kinetic energy recovery system (KERS) regenerative braking device produced by Toyota Racing Development (the Le Mans organisers, Automobile Club de l'Ouest (ACO), use the alternate name ERS) to charge a super capacitor. The extra power is directed to the rear wheels, giving an automatic horsepower increase of 300 bhp (220 kW; 300 PS). Its motor generator unit acts as a generator under braking; this allows it to harvest direct energy from the drive shaft which slows the car and converts energy into electricity that is stored in the super capacitor, which was supplied by Nisshinbo and mounted in the car's passenger compartment. The result allows for faster lap times when the driver exits track turns and saves fuel by reducing engine usage leaving a corner. Toyota chose Aisin AW to build the front electric motor while Denso were selected to build the rear power unit. Under the 2012 Le Mans rules they were allowed to use the system at any speed, unlike Audi who had elected to send power to the front, with a restriction to a minimum speed of 120 kilometres per hour (75 mph). Michelin was the team's tyre supplier.

=== Livery, launch and testing ===
The car was liveried in white, with blue stripes running down the sides of the cockpit and on top of each of its sidepods. Several sponsor stickers were on a number of areas of the car. The vehicle's race number was placed in a red square on the middle of the top section of its front left fender and the far-right of both fenders. The livery incorporated the colour scheme of Toyota's hybrid production cars and returned to the livery used by the Japanese manufacturer between 1985 and 1993. Toyota publicly announced its return to sports car racing in October 2011. Three months later the first car undertook a three-day, private test session at Circuit Paul Ricard. Toyota planned to test their TS030s for 40,000 kilometres (25,000 mi) during the 2012 pre-season period. The company entered into a partnership with the French-based Oreca racing team for the provision of operational support.

On 24 January the TS030 was shown to the press for the first time during its test session at Paul Ricard. After its three-day roll-out at Paul Ricard, the TS030 Hybrid covered more than 2,000 kilometres (1,200 mi) with tyre evaluation, testing the hybrid system over long distances, and aerodynamic and mechanical set-up optimising undertaken in their test session. The team returned to the track in mid-February and performed a 30-hour endurance stint, after evaluating multiple performance developments. After a heavy accident at Paul Ricard during a second endurance test on 4 April that damaged the chassis beyond repair, Toyota cancelled seven days of running at EuroSpeedway Lausitz and Ciudad del Motor de Aragón. Following the car's rebuilding, Toyota scheduled a functionality test at Circuit de Nevers Magny-Cours one month later.

=== Preparation ===
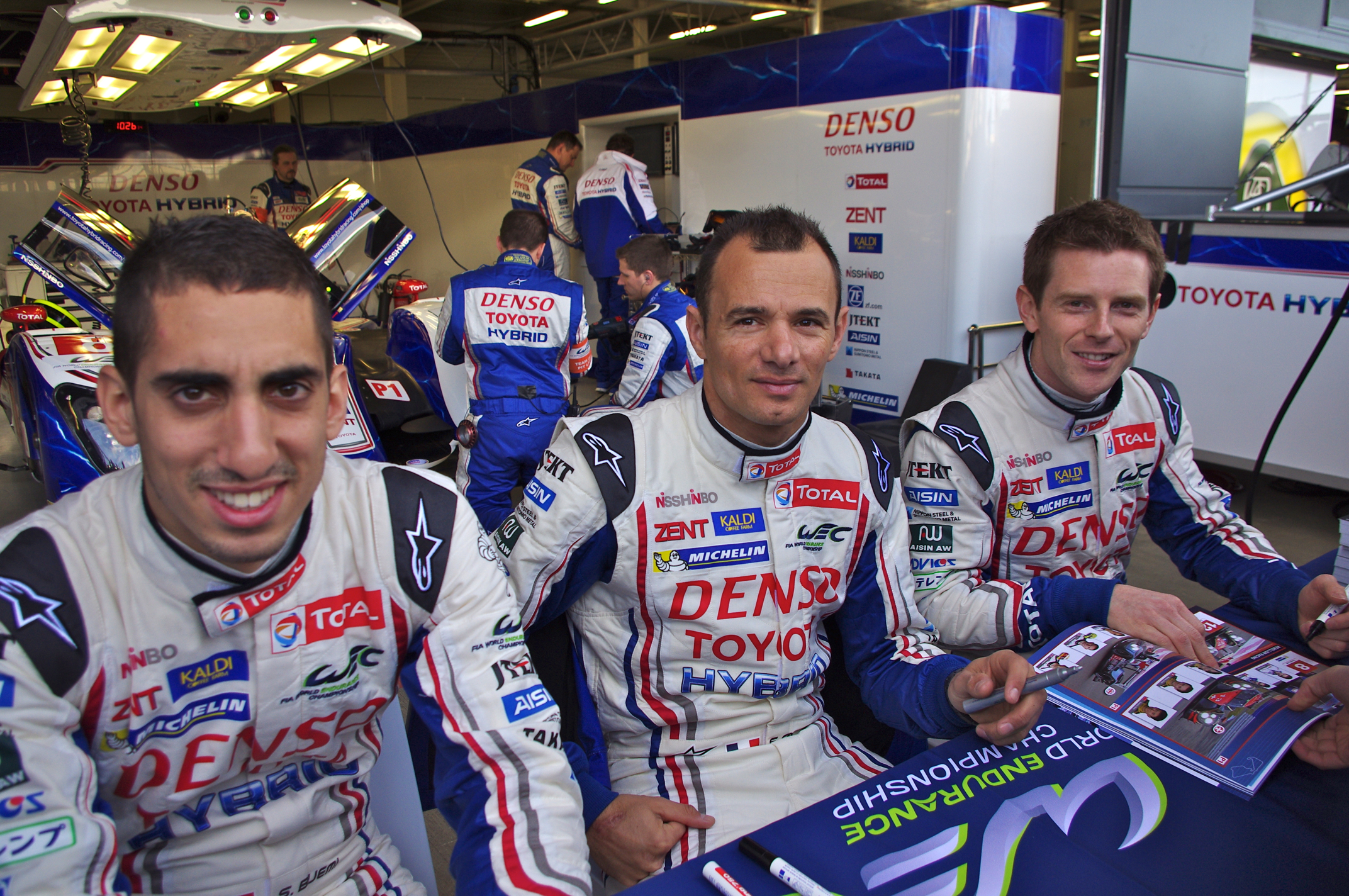
Sébastien Buemi, Stéphane Sarrazin and Anthony Davidson were chosen to drive the No. 8 Toyota.

The initial schedule for the TS030s consisted of participation in the May pre-qualifying and testing session at Le Mans in preparation for the race in June. It was scheduled to make its début in the 6 Hours of Spa-Francorchamps, but its heavy accident at Paul Ricard, forced the team was forced to delay the TS030's debut race appearance until the 24 Hours of Le Mans in June because of the time needed to produce a new monocoque. The ACO and world motorsport's governing body, the Fédération Internationale de l'Automobile (FIA), persuaded Toyota to expand their presence in the World Endurance Championship (WEC) by extending the deadline for entries following Peugeot's withdrawal from sports car racing, but Toyota elected not to enter the 12 Hours of Sebring because of time constraints.

In early 2012, Toyota named seven drivers to the team. Sébastien Buemi, the third driver for the Red Bull Racing Formula One team, had no prior experience of endurance motor racing. Former Williams Formula One and Formula Nippon driver Kazuki Nakajima also came from an open wheel racing background. Anthony Davidson was added to the team for his previous experience with sports cars, while Nicolas Lapierre transferred from Team Oreca's Le Mans squad. Alexander Wurz also had extensive experience of sports car racing having twice won the 24 Hours of Le Mans. Stéphane Sarrazin was employed by Toyota in May 2012 to replace Hiroaki Ishiura who withdrew following the completion of the car's first testing session due to back discomfort. Super GT competitor Andrea Caldarelli served as the team's junior driver.

== Racing history ==
=== 2012 ===
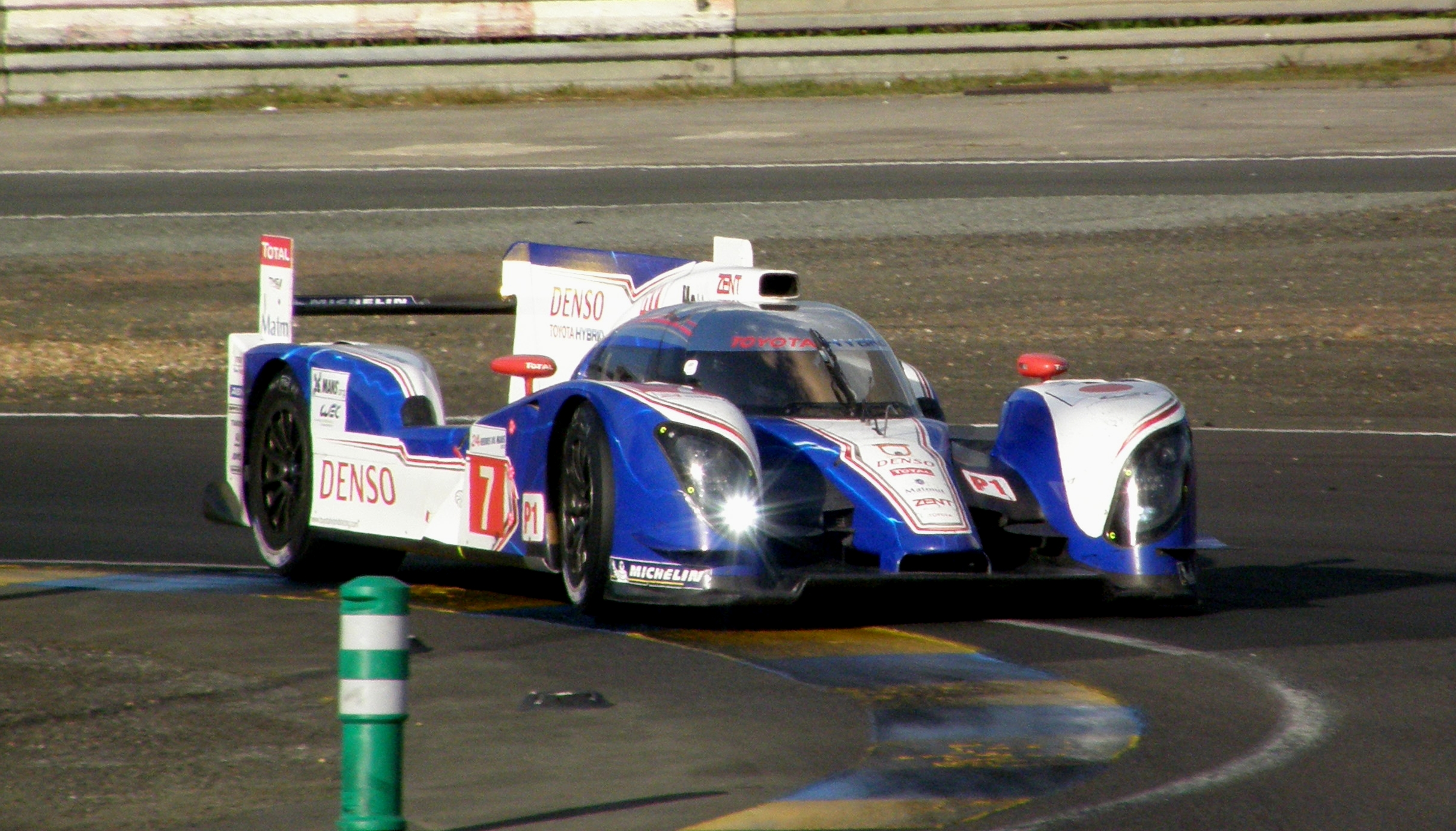
The No. 7 Toyota led laps at Le Mans before retiring because of an engine failure.

The TS030 Hybrid made its race debut at the 24 Hours of Le Mans with two cars entered. It was the first petrol-hybrid car to compete in the WEC. Despite electrical problems in practice and qualifying, the No. 8 car qualified third with the No. 7 entry securing fifth. On the 82nd lap, Davidson collided with the No. 81 AF Corse Ferrari of Piergiuseppe Perazzini at Mulsanne corner, somersaulted into the air and crashed heavily into a tyre barrier. Davidson got out of his car unassisted, but was transported to a local hospital, complaining of back pain. A medical inspection found he had cracked two vertebrae (T11 & T12) from the accident. The No. 7 TS030 Hybrid, which had briefly led the race before the accident, had previously suffered from car damage that required lengthy repairs to it, and retired ten and a half hours into the event after an engine failure. After Le Mans, Toyota fielded one car for the remainder of the season, and installed innovative rear wing extensions to their cars which garnered controversy in the series, but were declared legal. The championship resumed two months later at Silverstone, where the No. 7 Toyota qualified in third position, seven-tenths of a second behind the pole-sitting No. 1 Audi R18 e-tron quattro of Marcel Fässler, Benoît Tréluyer and André Lotterer. In the race, the car was able to compete with the lead Audi car, with the two vehicles trading the lead throughout, but lost their race-long duel and took second place, finishing ahead of Allan McNish's and Tom Kristensen's third-placed No. 2 Audi.

Nakajima missed the next two events because of Super GT commitments. At the following round of the season, the 6 Hours of São Paulo, Wurz took the TS030 Hybrid's first pole position on his first timed lap which he improved on minutes later; he was nearly eight-tenths of a second faster than Audi's No. 2 car driven by Lucas di Grassi. Wurz and Lapierre maintained the No. 7's pole position advantage throughout most of the race, only ceding it to Audi during the pit stop cycles, to secure its first victory in the WEC. (Note: It was the first win for Toyota in an FIA world championship event since the 1999 Rally of China and its first in international endurance motor sport since the 1992 500 km of Monza.) Lapierre qualified the No. 7 TS030 in third place for the 6 Hours of Bahrain behind the two rival Audi cars. Wurz started the car and used slower traffic to move into the lead 13 minutes into the race. Wurz and later Lapierre cemented their advantage at the front of the field over the next two hours until both illuminated number panels failed, forcing an unscheduled seven-minute pit stop for replacement car parts. Lapierre and later Wurz recovered to third place before Laiperre made contact with Jonny Kane in the No. 21 Strakka Racing HPD ARX-03a, damaging the No. 7 TS030 Hybrid's suspension. This caused him to abandon the car at the side of the track.

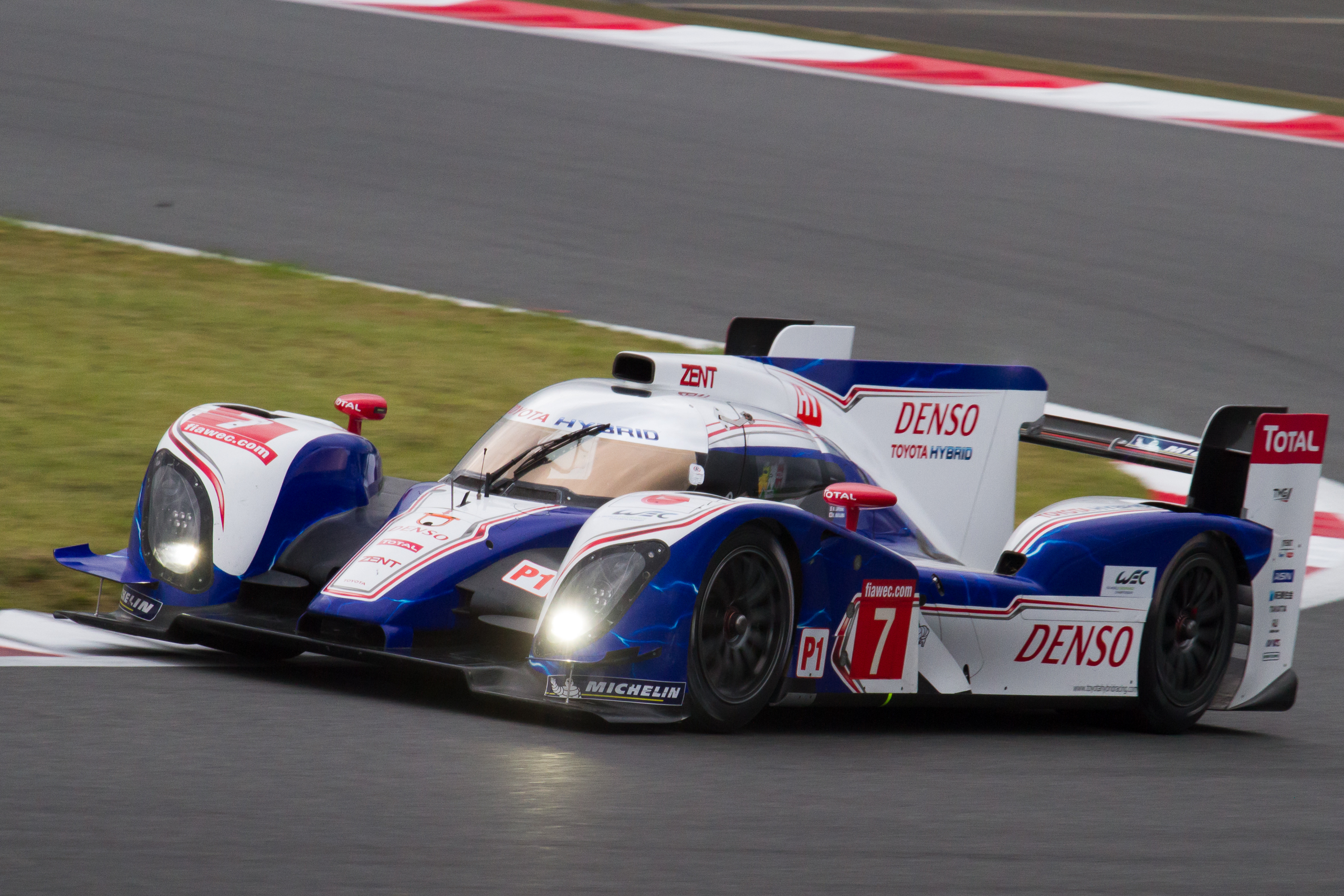
The No. 7 Toyota won its second race of the season at the 6 Hours of Fuji.

For the 6 Hours of Fuji, Nakajima returned to partner Wurz and Lapierre. He was nominated by Toyota to drive the No. 7 car in qualifying and took pole position with an early effort that removed Tréluyer in the No. 1 Audi from the top of the time sheets. In the race, the vehicle kept its startline advantage and pulled away from the field. The No. 2 Audi of Lotterer, Tréluyer and Fässler traded the lead with the Toyota multiple times before it was penalised for colliding with a slower car. Hence, the No. 7 Toyota maintained the lead for the rest of the race to secure its second victory of the season. Nakajima was unable to attend the 6 Hours of Shanghai because his Super GT commitments took priority over WEC, leaving Wurz and Laiperre to drive the car as a two-person entry. Wurz put the No. 7 TS030 Hybrid on pole position despite losing time on his fastest lap, and was one-tenth of a second quicker than McNish's No. 2 Audi. In the race, the car was unhindered throughout as it consistently ran under a second faster than both Audi cars, and only ceded the lead to their rivals in the pit stop cycle, clinching its third victory of the season with a large lead over Audi's No. 2 car. Competing with the TS030 Hybrid, the Toyota team scored 96 points and were second to Audi in the 2012 World Manufacturers' Championship.

=== 2013 ===
Toyota opted to develop the car to minimise the impact of the 2013 Technical Regulations which increased the minimum weight of manufacturer Le Mans Prototype 1 (LMP1) vehicles by 15 kilograms (33 lb) by focusing on fine-tuning the engine for power improvement, efficiency and reliability. They also manufactured new chassis tubs consisting of a narrower front nose because there was no longer a need to have an option to operate the hybrid system on the front wheels. The company had limited resources, so they elected to run one TS030 Hybrid for the entire WEC season with a second vehicle participating in selected rounds including the 24 Hours of Le Mans. The first race of the season, the 6 Hours of Silverstone, saw Toyota bring two 2012-specification cars in place of the updated 2013 chassis. Nakajima was absent from Silverstone because of a Super Formula commitment. Despite a timing system malfunction preventing lap times from being published for more than an hour, the No. 7 and No. 8 Toyota cars qualified in first and second places, separated by nearly two seconds. However, the event was at best uneventful, with neither car being able to match either Audi's pace, finishing third and fourth overall having struggled in the first few hours of the race with tyre management.

The second round of the season, the 2013 6 Hours of Spa-Francorchamps, saw Toyota debut the new 2013 specification car with one older chassis entered. After a close qualifying session, the updated No. 7 car ran near the front of the race for the first three hours, before retiring due to overheating brakes as a result of a malfunctioning energy recovery system. With the rear brake assembly designed to be assisted with certain amounts of mechanical retardation provided by the hybrid recovery system by design, it did not provide the deceleration when malfunctioning, thus overloading the conventional rear brakes. The No. 8 sister car remained in fourth for the rest of the event, closing what was a mixed outcome for the team. Post race, technical director Pascal Vasselon explained that "his team's analysis from Spa showed that the current Balance of Performance significantly favoured Audi's turbo-diesel engine over its own normally-aspirated petrol engine," calling for the ACO and FIA for a more favourable balance of performance to be applied before Le Mans. As agreed at the season's start, the FIA and the ACO reviewed the technical regulations at the end of May 2013 to adjust the performance between petrol and diesel LMP1 cars for the rest of the 2013 championship. From Le Mans onward, petrol-engine cars had an additional 3 litres (0.66 imp gal; 0.79 US gal) of fuel capacity.

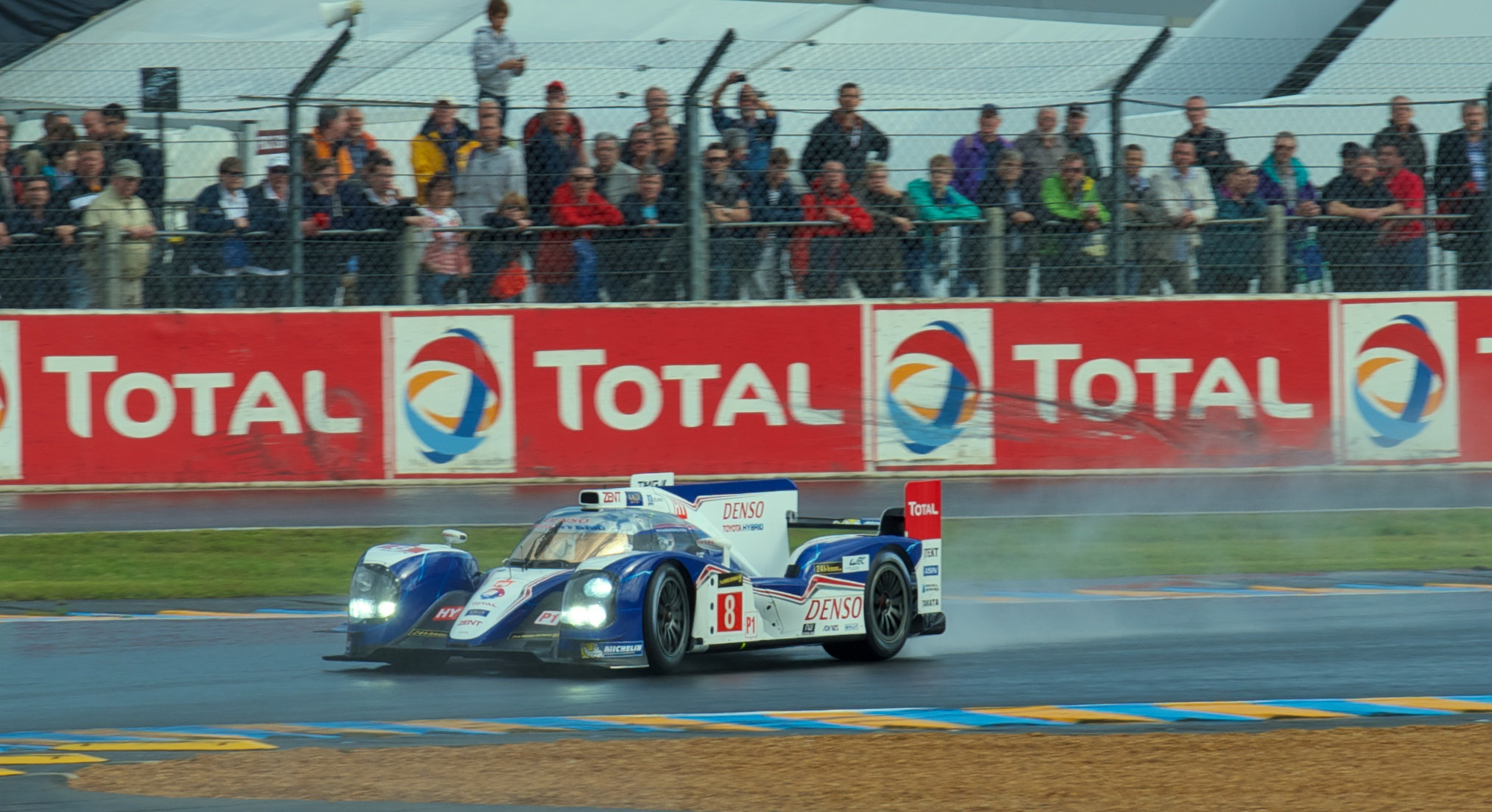
The No. 8 Toyota TS030 Hybrid that came second at Le Mans.

At Le Mans, the No. 8 Toyota qualified fourth, three-tenths ahead of the sister TS030 Hybrid in fifth, but off the pace of both Audi cars. The race started on a damp and slippery track with the two TS030 cars driving faster than they had done in qualifying, moving up the field and separating the first five runners. As the track dried, Toyota dropped back from the quicker Audi cars, but had better fuel mileage. This recurring pattern continued into the night when the No. 7 and 8 Toyota vehicles took over second and third places after two of Audi's entrants ran into problems. Rain fell overnight and Toyota's tyre strategy enabled their cars to narrow Audi's lead to below two minutes. The positions remained constant until heavy rain fell on the track in the final hour, and Lapierre in the No. 8 Toyota aquaplaned into the barriers, requiring swift and extensive car repairs, and finished fourth overall. The No. 8 Toyota of Buemi gained on Kristensen's No. 2 Audi in the closing stages, but was too far behind to effect any positional change and came second. Starting from the 6 Hours of São Paulo, Davidson, Buemi and Sarrazin took part in the next two races while Wurz and Lapierre focused on developing Toyota's 2014 car and Nakajima concentrated on a joint Super Formula and Super GT programme.

Buemi and Davidson were chosen to qualify the car and took third with a two-lap average lap time that was two-tenths slower than the pole-sitting No. 1 Audi. More than half an hour into the race, Sarrazin drove around the outside of the slower No. 32 Lotus T128 of Dominik Kraihamer to lap him, but Kraihamer lost control of his car's rear and went into Sarrazin's left-hand side. Both drivers made high speed contact with the turn three tyre barrier. The damage to the No. 8 Toyota's steering was great enough to force it to retire. At the inaugural 6 Hours of Circuit of the Americas held three weeks later, Sarrazin and Buemi qualified the car in third position, 1.3 seconds off the lead No. 2 Audi car's pace, and Sarrazin could not improve following Jan Charouz's No. 32 Lotus T128 hitting his rear-end, sending the TS030 Hybrid spinning at the first turn. In a warm weather affected race, Buemi moved into second immediately after a fifteen-minute safety car period and challenged the No. 1 Audi for the lead before the pit stop cycle. Toyota achieved a strong performance through better tyre management, enabling the No. 8 car to finish second. Going into the team's home event, the 6 Hours of Fuji, Toyota announced that two TS030 Hybrid cars would take part in the race.

Both Toyota cars lined up in second and third places on the grid with Buemi and Davidson driving the No. 8 car and Nakajima and Lapierre in the sister No. 7 vehicle. The race was shortened because of heavy rain and poor visibility. The No. 8 Toyota secured the victory when the No. 1 Audi made unscheduled pit stops for debris removal, with the other Toyota finishing one lap behind in 27th as it had to make a fuel pit stop at the race's start, but attempted to leave pit lane five seconds later than allowed and fell to the back of the field. Following their victory, Toyota changed a decision to run a sole car at Shanghai and included a second; reports suggested Toyota wished to increase their prospects of winning a race on outright speed. It was also confirmed that Nakajima would skip the round to contest the Super Formula Championship. Lapierre and Wurz qualified the No. 7 car on pole position with the No. 8 entry of Sarrazin and Buemi separating the two Audi cars in third. The No. 7 Toyota led the race heading into the final hour, but Wurz ceded it when he went off the racing line while moving past slower traffic because of worn tyres. It was overtaken by the No. 1 Audi and Wurz could only manage second place in the No. 7 car. Toyota's No. 8 car retired from the lead in the fifth hour because a right-front suspension bolt sheared.

For the season-closing round in Bahrain, Toyota confirmed to the press that two cars would be fielded with the provision that neither car finished in Shanghai with major problems, although the No. 8 Toyota's suspension failure did not affect their decision. It was also announced that Nakajima would return to drive the No. 7 car with Lapierre and Wurz. Both cars qualified on the front row of the grid with Wurz and Nakajima's No. 7 vehicle taking pole position by three-tenths of a second from the No. 8 Toyota of Sarrazin and Davidson. Although it picked up a vibration in the race's closing minutes, the No. 8 Toyota was unchallenged throughout, taking the victory with a one-minute and ten-second advantage over Audi's No. 1 car. It shared the lead with sister car No. 7 until it was driven to the side of the track when its engine failed before the second hour's end. Competing with the TS030 for the second consecutive year, the Toyota team accumulated 142.5 points and finished in second place in the World Manufacturers' Championship, 64.5 points behind rivals Audi. The new LMP1 regulations for 2014 made the TS030 Hybrid obsolete. The car was retired, and replaced by the TS040 Hybrid.

== Results summary ==
Results in bold indicate pole position. Results in italics indicate fastest lap.

Complete FIA World Endurance Championship results
Year	Entrant	Class	Drivers	No.	Rds.	Rounds								Points	Pos
Year	Entrant	Class	Drivers	No.	Rds.	1	2	3	4	5	6	7	8	Points	Pos
2012	Toyota Racing	LMP1	(France) Nicolas Lapierre (Japan) Kazuki Nakajima (Austria) Alexander Wurz	7	3–8; 3–4, 7; 3–8	SEB	SPA	LMS; Ret	SIL; 2	SÃO; 1	BHR; Ret	FUJ; 1	SHA; 1	**96**	**2nd**
2012	Toyota Racing	LMP1	(Switzerland) Sébastien Buemi (United Kingdom) Anthony Davidson (France) Stéphane Sarrazin	8	3; 3; 3	SEB	SPA	LMS; Ret	SIL	SÃO	BHR	FUJ	SHA	**96**	**2nd**
2013	Toyota Racing	LMP1	(France) Nicolas Lapierre (Japan) Kazuki Nakajima (Austria) Alexander Wurz	7	1–3, 6–8; 2–3, 6, 8; 1–3, 6–8	SIL; 4	SPA; Ret	LMS; 4	SÃO	COA	FUJ; 1	SHA; 2	BHR; Ret	**142.5**	**2nd**
2013	Toyota Racing	LMP1	(Switzerland) Sébastien Buemi (United Kingdom) Anthony Davidson (France) Stéphane Sarrazin	8	All; All; All	SIL; 3	SPA; 4	LMS; 2	SÃO; Ret	COA; 2	FUJ; 27	SHA; Ret	BHR; 1	**142.5**	**2nd**

== See also ==
- TMG EV P001
