= Toyota Racing GmbH =

Motorsport and automotive research and development facility owned by Toyota

- Formerly: Andersson Motorsport GmbH; Toyota Motorsport GmbH; Toyota Gazoo Racing Europe GmbH
- Type: Subsidiary
- Industry: Automotive
- Founder: Ove Andersson
- Headquarters: WEC: Cologne, Germany; Susono, Japan; WRC: Jyväskylä, Finland
- Owner: Toyota Motor Corporation
- Parent: Toyota Motor Europe
- Subsidiaries: Toyota Gazoo Racing WRT Oy
- Website: toyota-racing.com

Logo used until January 2026

Toyota Racing GmbH (TRG) is an automotive engineering and motorsport services facility based in Cologne, Germany. It is fully-owned and controlled by Toyota Motor Corporation.

TRG's principal operation is technical development of motorsport vehicles and their competitive entries on behalf of Toyota's Gazoo Racing brand in the FIA's World Endurance Championship (WEC) and World Rally Championship (WRC). The latter is run from a satellite facility in Jyväskylä, Finland, known as Toyota Gazoo Racing WRT.

TRG was also previously known as Andersson Motorsport, Toyota Motorsport GmbH (TMG) (both of which ran Toyota Team Europe (TTE) entries in the WRC), and Toyota Gazoo Racing Europe GmbH (TGR-E).

== History ==
=== Andersson Motorsport ===
TGR-E began as Andersson Motorsport in Sweden, a company established by rally driver Ove Andersson for his own motorsport career. His relationship with Toyota began in 1972 when he was offered a Toyota Celica to drive in the RAC Rally in the autumn of that year. The relationship developed and from 1973, Andersson Motorsport was appointed for responsibility of Toyota's works entries in the then new World Rally Championship, competing in the name of Toyota Team Europe (TTE). In 1975, the team and organisation moved to Brussels, Belgium; then again in 1979 to Cologne, Germany where it was established as Andersson Motorsport GmbH.

=== Toyota Motorsport GmbH (TMG) ===
In 1993, Toyota Motor Corporation bought Andersson Motorsport GmbH and renamed it to Toyota Motorsport GmbH (TMG). Andersson remained as team manager of TTE. At this time, as a fully owned part of Toyota, TMG were employing 300 staff from 17 nations.

In 1998 and 1999, TMG entered the 24 Hours of Le Mans, finishing 2nd in 1999 with their Toyota GT-One.

After 1999, Toyota stopped participating in rallying and sportscar racing in order to prepare for a switch to Formula One (F1) in 2002 using existing TMG resources. From 2002 to 2009, TMG operated its parent company's Formula One team named Panasonic Toyota Racing, starting 139 Grands Prix. In that time they finished on the podium 13 times, earned three pole positions and scored a total of 278.5 points. TMG also provided their Toyota F1 engines to the Jordan Formula One Team in 2005, which was then sold and renamed as Midland F1 Racing in 2006, but continued using Toyota F1 engines until their withdrawal from F1 at the end of 2006. Williams Formula One Team were also TMG's customers for their Toyota F1 engines from 2007 to 2009. On 4 November 2009, Toyota announced their withdrawal from F1.

TMG moved back into sports car racing from 2011 as an engine supplier to Lola Cars, powering Rebellion Racing. In 2012, TMG fully returned to sports car competition entries with the Toyota TS030 Hybrid in the World Endurance Championship.

In 2015, it was announced Toyota would return to the World Rally Championship in 2017 with a Yaris WRC built and prepared by TMG in Cologne. However, several months later it was announced TMG would only be responsible for engine development whilst Tommi Mäkinen Racing Oy (TMR) would develop the car and run the entry from Finland.

=== Toyota Gazoo Racing Europe ===
TMG was renamed to Toyota Gazoo Racing Europe in April 2020. In 2021, TGR-E assumed the running of the WRC team from Tommi Mäkinen Racing.

=== Toyota Racing ===
In January 2026, Toyota announced that TGR will revert to the name Gazoo Racing whereas TGR-E will be renamed as Toyota Racing. The exercise will be completed in January 2027.

== Motorsport activities ==
Toyota Gazoo Racing
- Founded: 1979
- Base: Cologne, Germany (FIA WEC); Jyväskylä, Finland (FIA WRC)
- Team principal(s): Kamui Kobayashi (FIA WEC); Jari-Matti Latvala (FIA WRC)
- Current series: FIA World Endurance Championship; FIA World Rally Championship
- Former series: FIA Formula One World Championship
- Current drivers: (Netherlands) Nyck de Vries; (United Kingdom) Mike Conway; (Japan) Kamui Kobayashi; (Argentina) José María López; (Switzerland) Sébastien Buemi; (Japan) Ryo Hirakawa; (New Zealand) Brendon Hartley; (France) Sébastien Ogier; (United Kingdom) Elfyn Evans; (Finland) Kalle Rovanperä; (Japan) Takamoto Katsuta
- Teams' Championships: FIA World Rally Championship: 1993, 1994, 1999, 2018, 2021, 2022, 2023, 2024, 2025, 2026; FIA World Endurance Championship: 2014, 2018–19, 2019–20, 2021, 2022, 2023, 2024, 2026
- Drivers' Championships: FIA World Rally Championship: 1990, 1992, 1993, 1994, 2019, 2020, 2021, 2022, 2023, 2025, 2026; FIA World Endurance Championship: 2014, 2018–19, 2019–20, 2021, 2022, 2023, 2026
- Website: www.tgr-europe.com

=== Rally ===
==== Toyota Team Europe ====
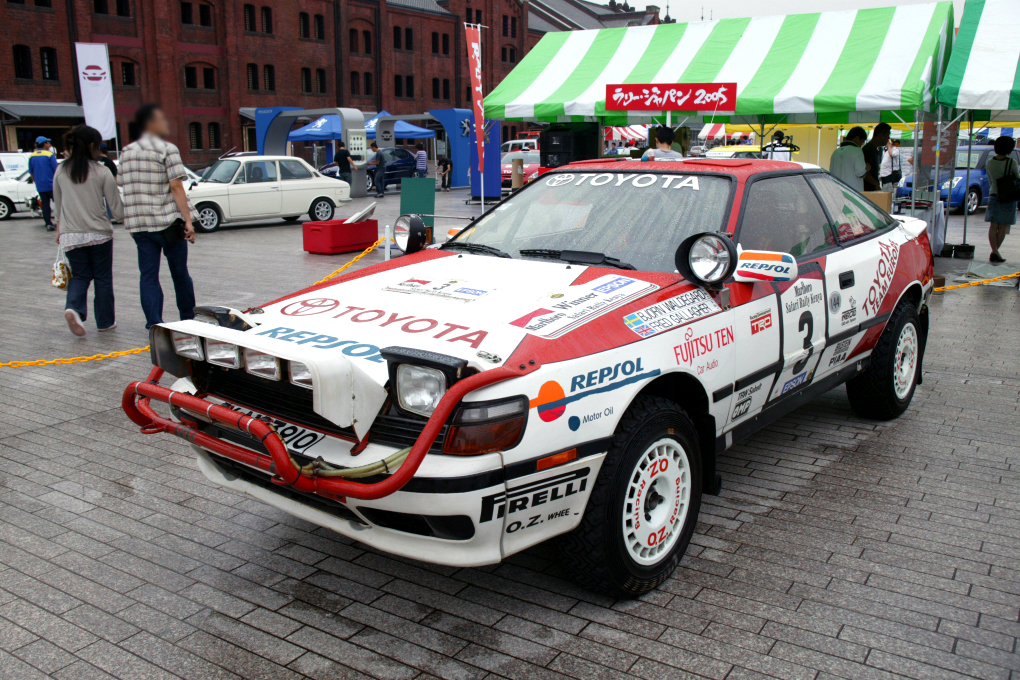
Toyota Celica GT-Four ST165 Group A in Safari Rally trim

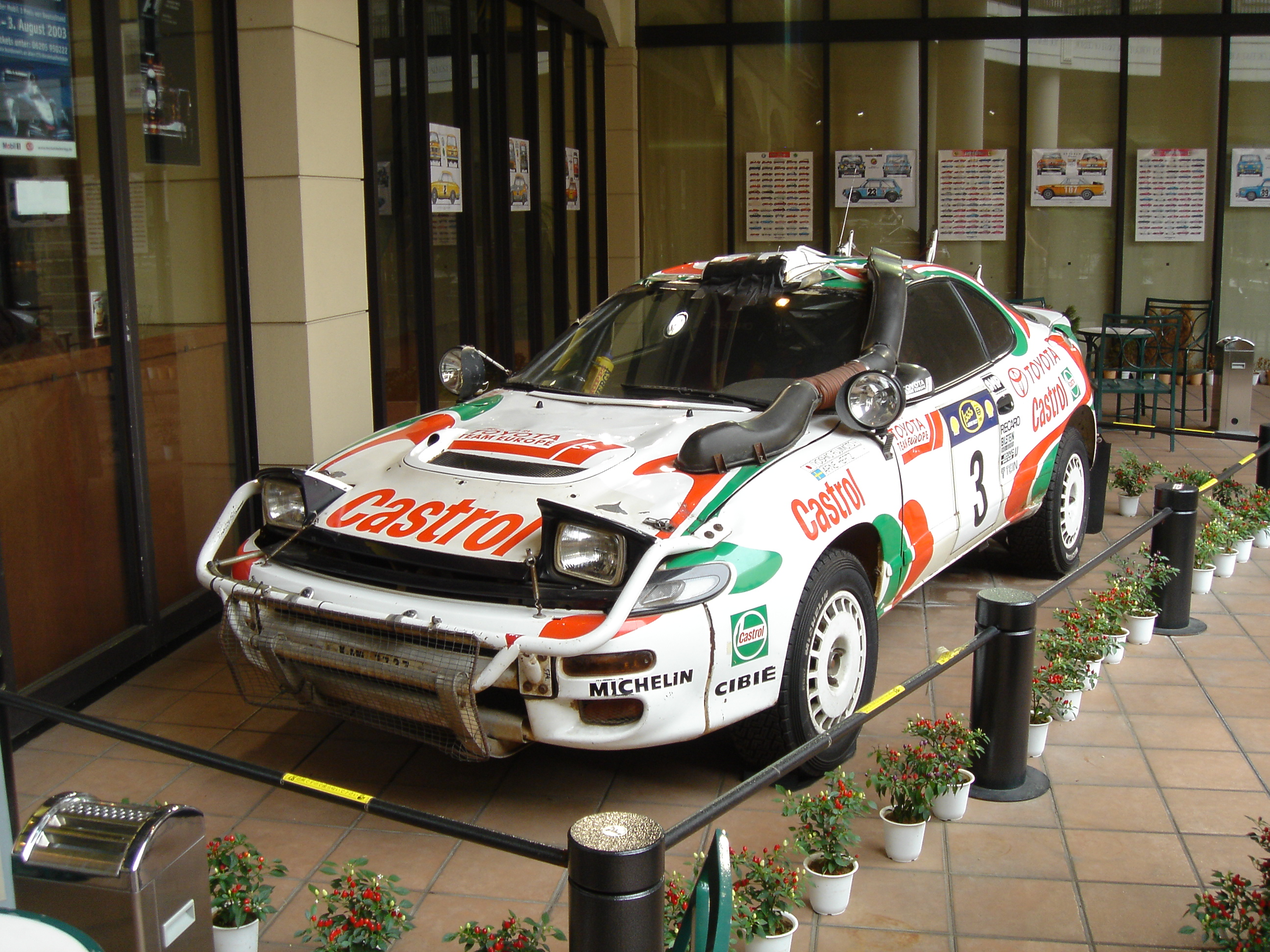
TTE's Celica GT-Four ST185 Group A in Safari Rally trim

Toyota Team Europe (TTE) began in February 1975. In August of that year, Hannu Mikkola won TTE's first rally, the 1000 Lakes Rally in a Corolla 1600, where the competition used 2.0 L engines.

In September 1987, TTE moved to a larger premises, in which they still reside. It was also the time they revealed their first four wheel drive car, the Toyota Celica GT-Four, driven by Juha Kankkunen and Kenneth Eriksson. Carlos Sainz won the 1990 FIA World Rally Championship Title for Drivers with ST165. The newer GT-Four, ST185, made its debut at the 1992 Rallye Monte Carlo, culminating in Sainz again winning the title in this year. The ST185 also won the WRC Driver's and Manufacturer's Titles in 1993 with Juha Kankkunen, and in 1994 with Didier Auriol.

In 1995 TTE was banned for 12 months from the World Rally Championship (WRC) for cheating by designing an illegal air restrictor on the ST205 that included both a bypass mechanism and spring-loaded devices to conceal it from scrutineers. While under suspension in 1996 (as well in 1997, when the Corolla was not yet ready), Toyota continued to support the Celica ST205 rallied by Italian HF Grifone team, Toyota Team Sweden, Marlboro Toyota Team Belgium, and Tein Sport in selected WRC events.

==== Toyota Castrol Team ====
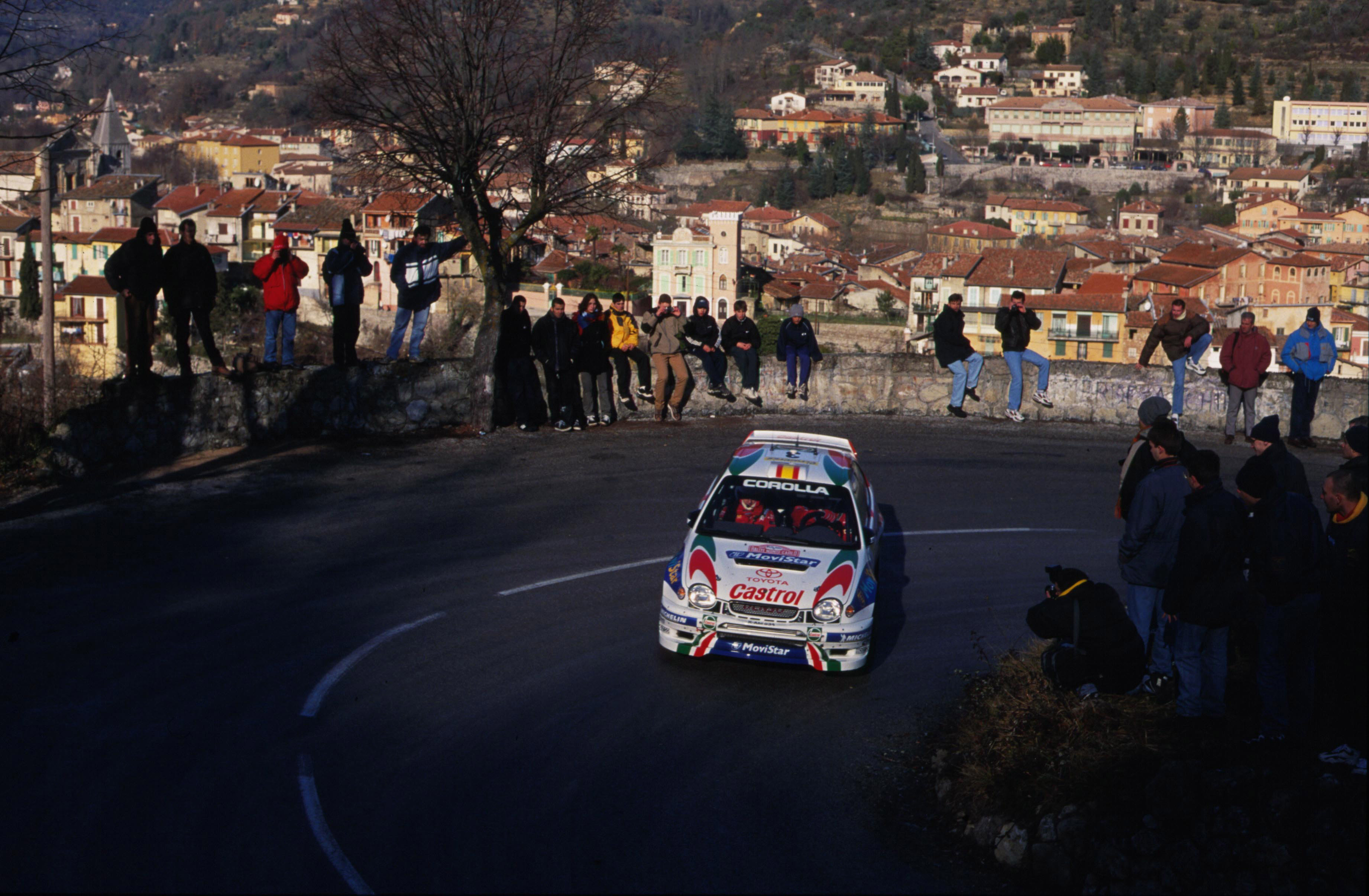
Toyota Castrol Team Corolla WRC at the 1999 Monte-Carlo Rally

In the new World Rally Car era of the WRC, Toyota introduced the Corolla WRC in the 1997 Rally of Finland with a new team name sponsored by the lubricants company, Castrol. The team however, did not enter the manufacturer's championship that year. When they returned to contest the championship in 1998, they did so with the Corolla WRC driven by the crews of Carlos Sainz/Luis Moya and Didier Auriol/Denis Giraudet. They finished the season in second overall in both the Drivers' and Manufacturers' Championships.

In 1999 however, the manufacturers championship was taken, the third in TTE's existence. Toyota withdrew from rallying at the end of the 1999 season in order for Toyota Motorsport GmbH to focus on entries in Formula One and CART. The facility continued to provide services and support to customer teams within the sport.

==== Toyota Gazoo Racing World Rally Team ====
Toyota Motorsport developed an early prototype Toyota Yaris WRC in preparation for the Toyota Gazoo Racing entry in the 2017 World Rally Championship. Ultimately, TMG only produced the engine whilst Tommi Mäkinen Racing Oy of Finland (TMR) developed a new Yaris WRC around it. In 2021, following the purchase by Toyota, TMR was subsequently renamed to Toyota Gazoo Racing World Rally Team Oy, and it became a branch of TGR-E. The facility in Cologne continued to provide engines for the new hybrid Toyota GR Yaris Rally1 car used in WRC from 2022.

=== Sports car racing history ===
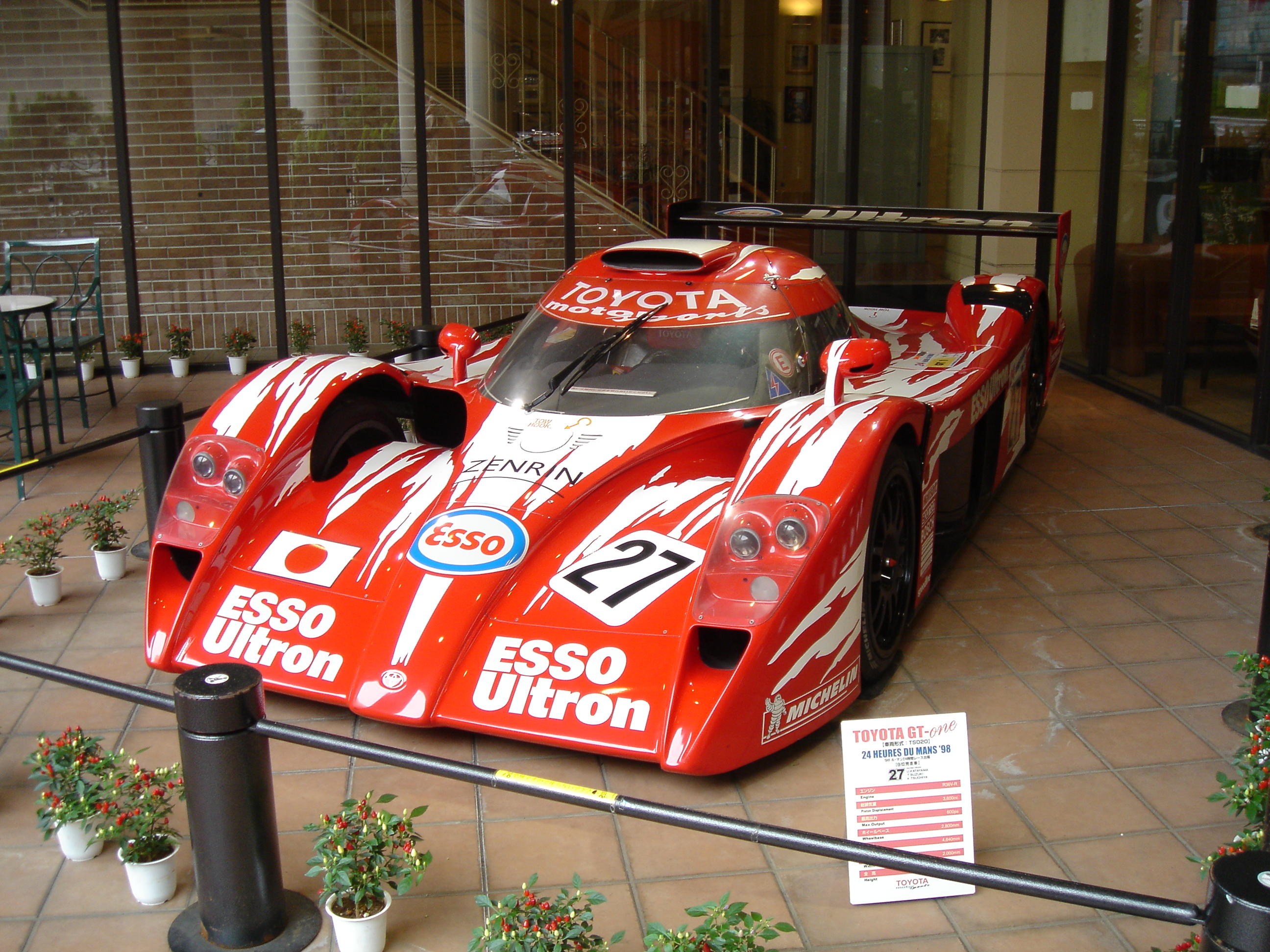
The Toyota GT-One

In addition to spearheading Toyota's efforts in the World Rally Championship, the group has also developed and run the Toyota GT-One and Toyota TS030 Hybrid in sports car racing. The GT-One entered the 24 Hours of Le Mans in both 1998 and 1999, and the TS030 Hybrid made its début in 2012.

==== GT-One ====
Introduced in time for Le Mans in 1998, the GT-One first appeared at the official testing days for the race held in May. Three GT-Ones appeared, setting the second, fifth, and tenth best times, easily beating out custom built prototypes which were meant to be the superior class. For the race week itself, all three cars performed admirably in qualifying by continuing their quick pace, qualifying second, seventh, and eighth, being beaten only by their GT class competitor, Mercedes-Benz. For the race itself, the No. 28 GT-One suffered from a high speed accident halfway through the race, taking it out of competition. The two other entrants continued to fight on, both remaining in the top 10. However, within the closing hours, the higher ranked No. 29 GT-One suffered a gearbox failure while in competition for the race win. Thus Toyota was left to take ninth place in the race with the lone No. 27 entry, which ended the race 25 laps behind the winning Porsche 911 GT1.

Their 1999 24 Hours of Le Mans started bitterly after the team was plagued by multiple Michelin tyre failures, the situation becoming somewhat reminiscent of 1998, when the No. 1 and No. 2 car were retired. Martin Brundle in the No. 1 Toyota suffered a puncture at high speed on the Mulsanne Straight, the cars rear suspension was badly damaged and he was unable to get back to the pits. The No. 2 Toyota being driven by Thierry Boutsen was next to go when he suffered a high speed crash under the Dunlop bridge due to a rapid deflation. The car was destroyed and Boutsen suffered injury to his lower back. At the break of dawn, the No. 15 BMW was almost a lap ahead of the No. 3 Toyota which had been quietly cruising around at a steady pace. With this sniff of a win Ukyo Katayama put the foot down in the Toyota and set the fastest lap of the race. He narrowed the gap to less than a minute till again a tyre blowout befell the Toyota team again. Katayama was however able to return to the pits for new tyres and continued. He managed to finish second after a valiant effort placing first in the GT-P class. However, they fell short of the overall victory at Le Mans, which would have made them only the second Japanese manufacturer to get an overall win (Mazda being the first in 1991).

The GT-One raced only once more, a single entrant appearing in the 1999 Le Mans Fuji 1000km. Although the race mostly consisted of Japanese teams, thus leaving out most of the manufacturers that had competed at Le Mans, Toyota still had to compete against rival Nissan, who also entered their R391. In the end the GT-One would fall short once again, finishing second and only one lap behind the winning R391.

The GT-One program was not continued into 2000, Toyota instead turning TTE into leaders of the new Toyota F1 team. This would mark a hiatus in Toyota's attempts at Le Mans until the 2012 season, over a decade later, when Toyota decided to once again contest at the top tier of sports car racing.

==== Toyota TS030 Hybrid ====
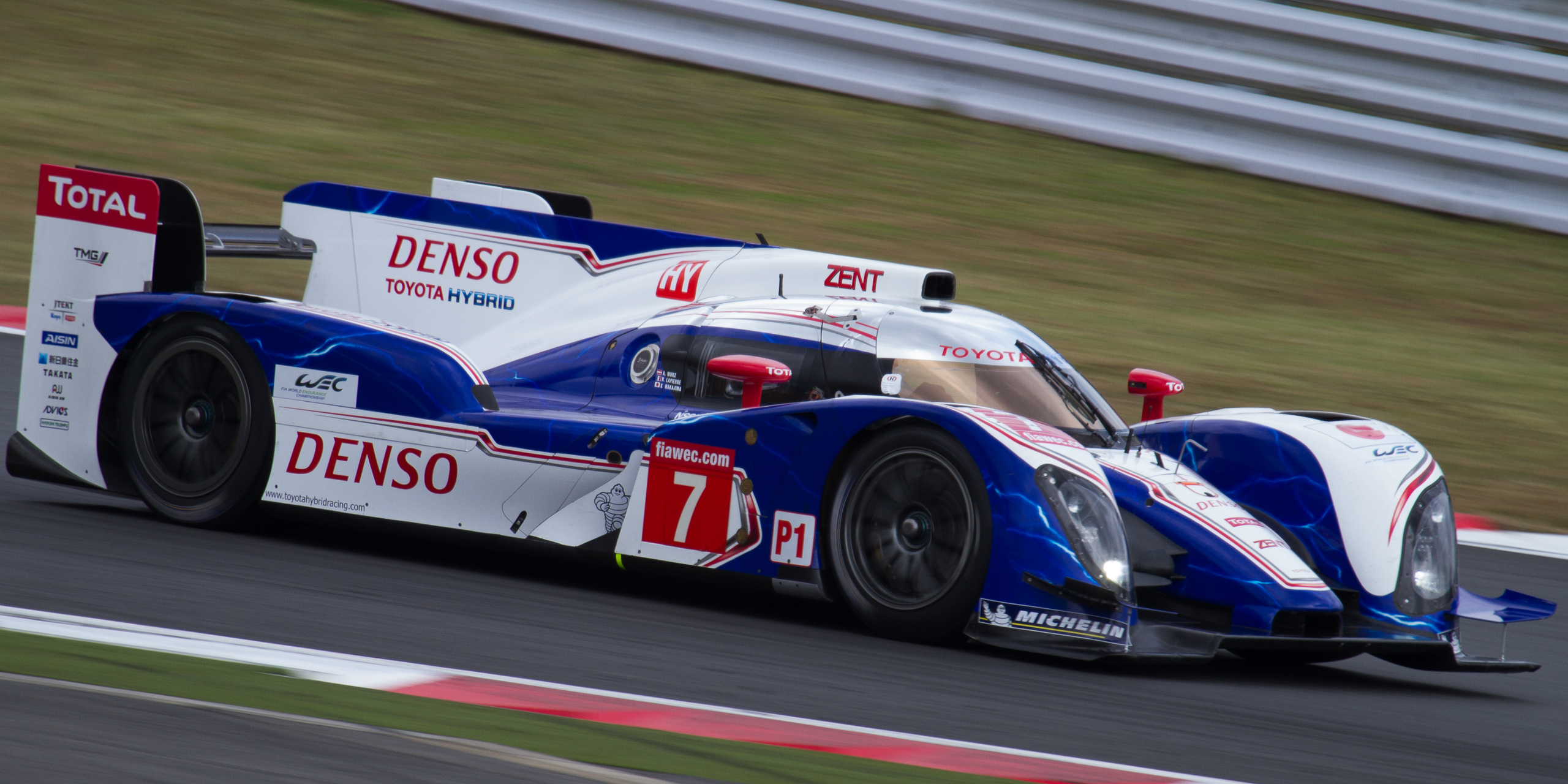
Toyota TS030 Hybrid LMP1

In October 2011, Toyota announced its return to Le Mans in 2012 after twelve-year hiatus, with a hybrid-powered Le Mans Prototype, sporting a petrol engine similar to that found in their customer P1 car. The car would be entered in the inaugural season of the FIA World Endurance Championship, though it would miss the first round of the series.

Toyota suffered a severe setback with a crash in late April preventing the debut of the car at the 2012 6 Hours of Spa-Francorchamps, but managed to get two TS030s ready by Le Mans. Unfortunately, neither car finished the race: the #8 car being driven by Anthony Davidson suffered a massive crash with a Ferrari 458 (which also fractured two of Davidson's vertebrae), while the No. 7 car hit the DeltaWing and later retired with an engine failure.

Toyota continued to compete in the rest of the WEC season with a single car, collecting three wins including the 6 Hours of Fuji.

At the 2013 24 Hours of Le Mans Toyota achieved its fourth second-place finish at Le Mans with a revised Toyota TS030 driven by Stéphane Sarrazin, Anthony Davidson and Sébastien Buemi. The sister car finished in fourth several laps down.

Toyota finished the WEC season in second place again, taking two wins at rain-shortened Fuji and Shanghai.

==== Toyota TS040 Hybrid ====
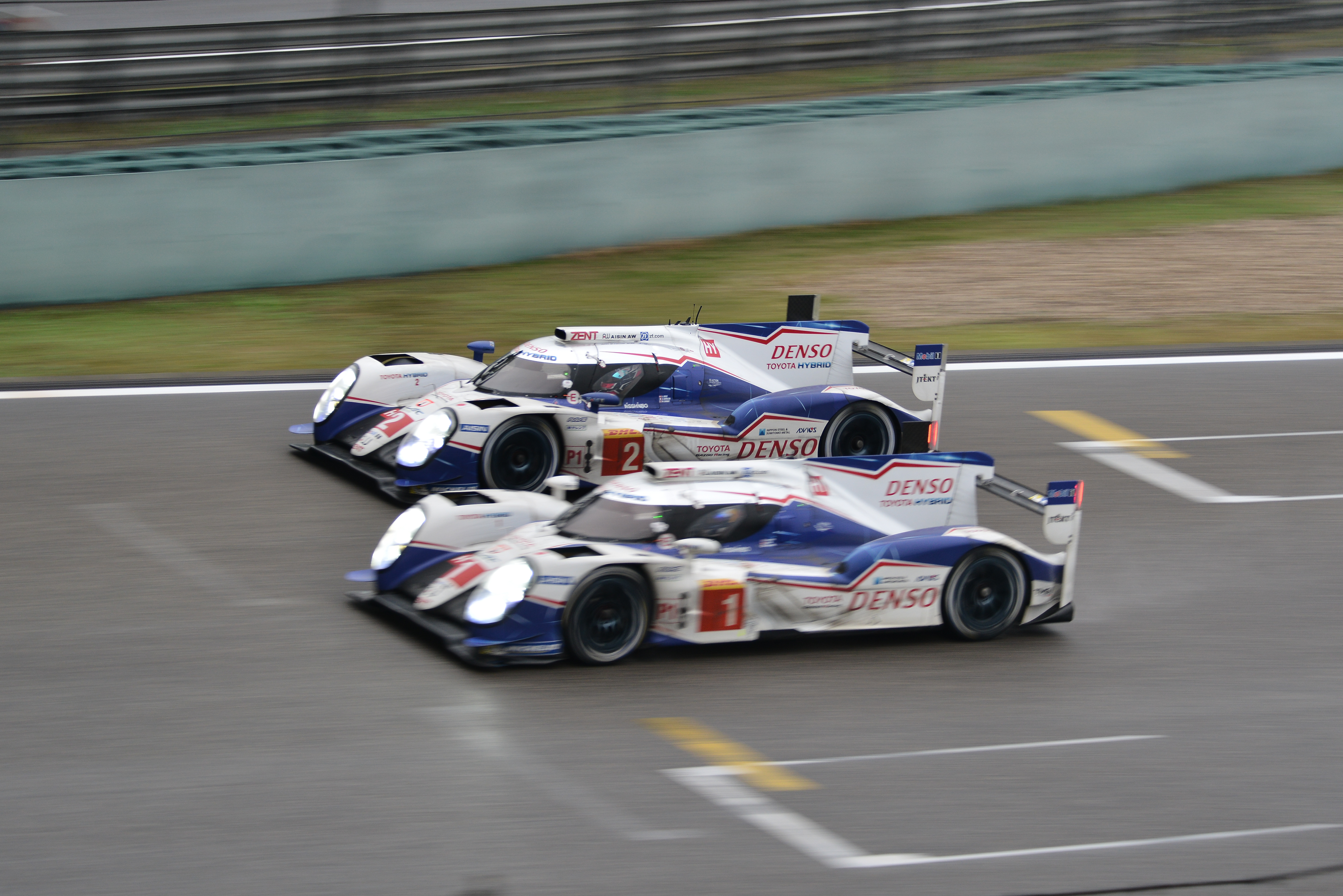
2 Toyota TS040s Hybrid LMP1

Toyota announced in October 2013 that it would continue racing in the World Endurance Championship in 2014. In order to comply with new-for-2014 LMP1 rules, Toyota revealed its new car, the Toyota TS040 Hybrid. The car has a 3.7L V8 normally aspirated petrol engine powering the rear wheels, and regenerative-braking devices at both axles to allow temporary four-wheel drive.

==== Toyota TS050 Hybrid ====
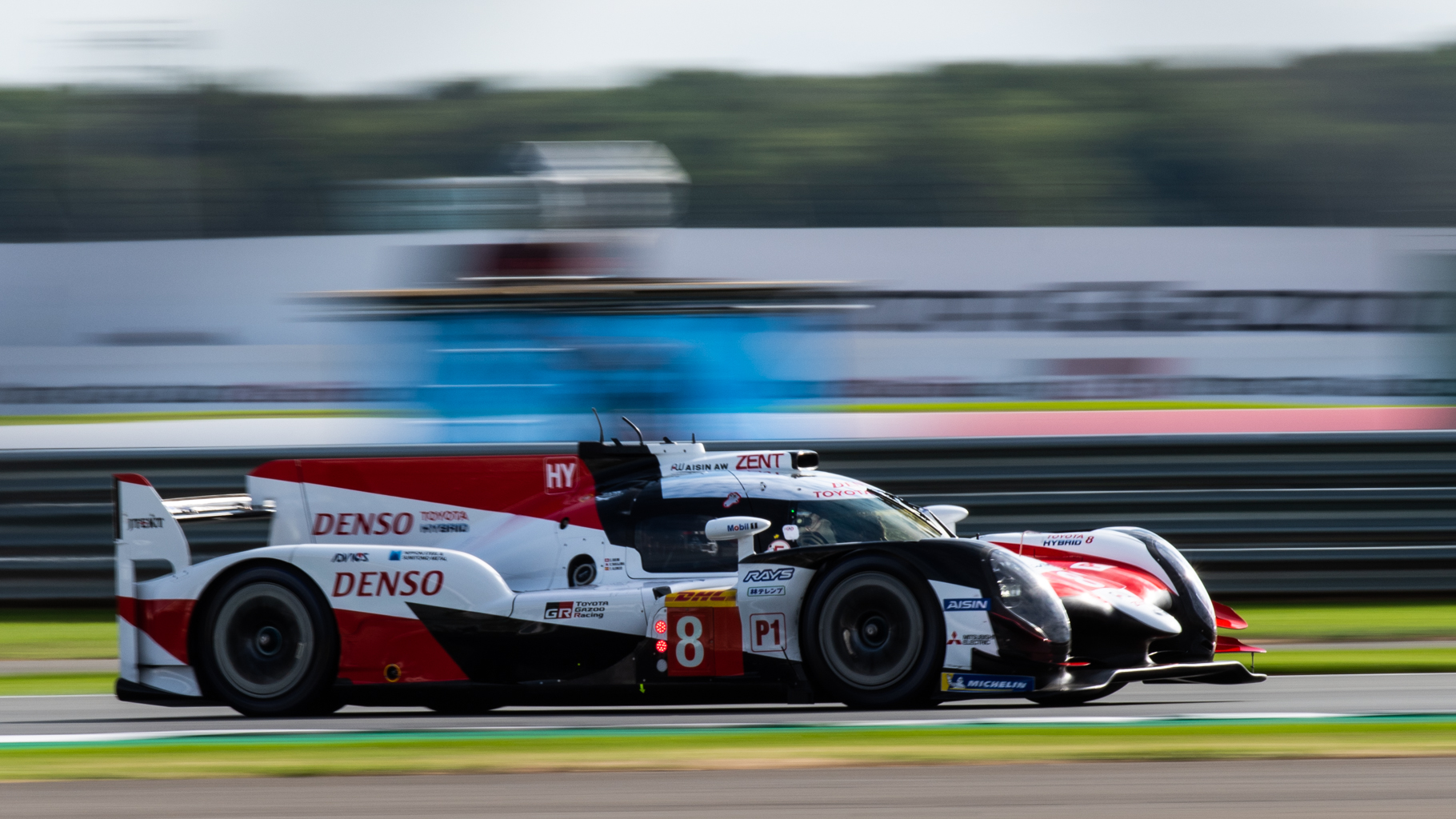
2 Toyota TS050 Hybrid LMP1

The Toyota TS050 Hybrid was developed for the 2016 FIA World Endurance Championship. It was powered by the H8909 2.4L V6 twin-turbo petrol engine for the first time and a 2.22 kWh battery hybrid system.

==== Toyota GR010 Hybrid ====
Toyota GR010 Hybrid LMH

The Toyota GR010 Hybrid competed in the 2021 FIA World Endurance Championship under the new Le Mans Hypercar regulations. It has a 3.5L V6 twin-turbo petrol engine connected to the rear wheels, and a battery hybrid system connected to the front wheels.

==== 24 Hours of Le Mans results ====
Year	Entrant	No	Car	Drivers	Class	Laps	Pos.	Class Pos.
1998	(Japan) Toyota Motorsports	27	Toyota GT-One	(Japan) Ukyo Katayama (Japan) Toshio Suzuki (Japan) Keiichi Tsuchiya	LMGT1	326	9th	8th
1998	(Japan) Toyota Motorsports	28	Toyota GT-One	(United Kingdom) Martin Brundle (France) Emmanuel Collard (France) Éric Hélary	LMGT1	191	DNF	DNF
1998	(Japan) Toyota Motorsports	29	Toyota GT-One	(Belgium) Thierry Boutsen (Germany) Ralf Kelleners (United Kingdom) Geoff Lees	LMGT1	330	DNF	DNF
1999	(Japan) Toyota Motorsports	1	Toyota GT-One	(United Kingdom) Martin Brundle (France) Emmanuel Collard (Italy) Vincenzo Sospiri	LMGTP	90	DNF	DNF
1999	(Japan) Toyota Motorsports	2	Toyota GT-One	(Belgium) Thierry Boutsen (Germany) Ralf Kelleners (United Kingdom) Allan McNish	LMGTP	173	DNF	DNF
1999	(Japan) Toyota Motorsports	3	Toyota GT-One	(Japan) Ukyo Katayama (Japan) Toshio Suzuki (Japan) Keiichi Tsuchiya	LMGTP	364	2nd	1st
2012	(Japan) Toyota Racing	7	Toyota TS030 Hybrid	(France) Nicolas Lapierre (Japan) Kazuki Nakajima (Austria) Alexander Wurz	LMP1	134	DNF	DNF
2012	(Japan) Toyota Racing	8	Toyota TS030 Hybrid	(Switzerland) Sébastien Buemi (United Kingdom) Anthony Davidson (France) Stéphane Sarrazin	LMP1	82	DNF	DNF
2013	(Japan) Toyota Racing	7	Toyota TS030 Hybrid	(France) Nicolas Lapierre (Japan) Kazuki Nakajima (Austria) Alexander Wurz	LMP1	341	4th	4th
2013	(Japan) Toyota Racing	8	Toyota TS030 Hybrid	(Switzerland) Sébastien Buemi (United Kingdom) Anthony Davidson (France) Stéphane Sarrazin	LMP1	347	2nd	2nd
2014	(Japan) Toyota Racing	7	Toyota TS040 Hybrid	(Japan) Kazuki Nakajima (France) Stéphane Sarrazin (Austria) Alexander Wurz	LMP1-H	219	DNF	DNF
2014	(Japan) Toyota Racing	8	Toyota TS040 Hybrid	(Switzerland) Sébastien Buemi (United Kingdom) Anthony Davidson (France) Nicolas Lapierre	LMP1-H	374	3rd	3rd
2015	(Japan) Toyota Racing	1	Toyota TS040 Hybrid	(Switzerland) Sébastien Buemi (United Kingdom) Anthony Davidson (Japan) Kazuki Nakajima	LMP1	386	8th	8th
2015	(Japan) Toyota Racing	2	Toyota TS040 Hybrid	(United Kingdom) Mike Conway (France) Stéphane Sarrazin (Austria) Alexander Wurz	LMP1	387	6th	6th
2016	(Japan) Toyota Gazoo Racing	5	Toyota TS050 Hybrid	(Switzerland) Sébastien Buemi (United Kingdom) Anthony Davidson (Japan) Kazuki Nakajima	LMP1	384	NC	NC
2016	(Japan) Toyota Gazoo Racing	6	Toyota TS050 Hybrid	(United Kingdom) Mike Conway (Japan) Kamui Kobayashi (France) Stéphane Sarrazin	LMP1	381	2nd	2nd
2017	(Japan) Toyota Gazoo Racing	7	Toyota TS050 Hybrid	(United Kingdom) Mike Conway (Japan) Kamui Kobayashi (France) Stéphane Sarrazin	LMP1	154	DNF	DNF
2017	(Japan) Toyota Gazoo Racing	8	Toyota TS050 Hybrid	(Switzerland) Sébastien Buemi (United Kingdom) Anthony Davidson (Japan) Kazuki Nakajima	LMP1	358	8th	2nd
2017	(Japan) Toyota Gazoo Racing	9	Toyota TS050 Hybrid	(Japan) Yuji Kunimoto (France) Nicolas Lapierre (Argentina) José María López	LMP1	160	DNF	DNF
2018	(Japan) Toyota Gazoo Racing	7	Toyota TS050 Hybrid	(United Kingdom) Mike Conway (Japan) Kamui Kobayashi (Argentina) José María López	LMP1	386	2nd	2nd
2018	(Japan) Toyota Gazoo Racing	8	Toyota TS050 Hybrid	(Spain) Fernando Alonso (Switzerland) Sébastien Buemi (Japan) Kazuki Nakajima	LMP1	388	1st	1st
2019	(Japan) Toyota Gazoo Racing	7	Toyota TS050 Hybrid	(United Kingdom) Mike Conway (Japan) Kamui Kobayashi (Argentina) José María López	LMP1	385	2nd	2nd
2019	(Japan) Toyota Gazoo Racing	8	Toyota TS050 Hybrid	(Spain) Fernando Alonso (Switzerland) Sébastien Buemi (Japan) Kazuki Nakajima	LMP1	385	1st	1st
2020	(Japan) Toyota Gazoo Racing	7	Toyota TS050 Hybrid	(United Kingdom) Mike Conway (Japan) Kamui Kobayashi (Argentina) José María López	LMP1	381	3rd	3rd
2020	(Japan) Toyota Gazoo Racing	8	Toyota TS050 Hybrid	(Switzerland) Sébastien Buemi (New Zealand) Brendon Hartley (Japan) Kazuki Nakajima	LMP1	387	1st	1st
2021	(Japan) Toyota Gazoo Racing	7	Toyota GR010 Hybrid	(United Kingdom) Mike Conway (Japan) Kamui Kobayashi (Argentina) José María López	Hypercar	371	1st	1st
2021	(Japan) Toyota Gazoo Racing	8	Toyota GR010 Hybrid	(Switzerland) Sébastien Buemi (New Zealand) Brendon Hartley (Japan) Kazuki Nakajima	Hypercar	369	2nd	2nd
2022	(Japan) Toyota Gazoo Racing	7	Toyota GR010 Hybrid	(United Kingdom) Mike Conway (Japan) Kamui Kobayashi (Argentina) José María López	Hypercar	380	2nd	2nd
2022	(Japan) Toyota Gazoo Racing	8	Toyota GR010 Hybrid	(Switzerland) Sébastien Buemi (New Zealand) Brendon Hartley (Japan) Ryō Hirakawa	Hypercar	380	1st	1st
2023	(Japan) Toyota Gazoo Racing	7	Toyota GR010 Hybrid	(United Kingdom) Mike Conway (Japan) Kamui Kobayashi (Argentina) José María López	Hypercar	103	DNF	DNF
2023	(Japan) Toyota Gazoo Racing	8	Toyota GR010 Hybrid	(Switzerland) Sébastien Buemi (New Zealand) Brendon Hartley (Japan) Ryō Hirakawa	Hypercar	342	2nd	2nd
2024	(Japan) Toyota Gazoo Racing	7	Toyota GR010 Hybrid	(Japan) Kamui Kobayashi (Argentina) José María López (Netherlands) Nyck de Vries	Hypercar	311	2nd	2nd
2024	(Japan) Toyota Gazoo Racing	8	Toyota GR010 Hybrid	(Switzerland) Sébastien Buemi (New Zealand) Brendon Hartley (Japan) Ryō Hirakawa	Hypercar	311	5th	5th
2025	(Japan) Toyota Gazoo Racing	7	Toyota GR010 Hybrid	(United Kingdom) Mike Conway (Japan) Kamui Kobayashi (Netherlands) Nyck de Vries	Hypercar	386	5th	5th
2025	(Japan) Toyota Gazoo Racing	8	Toyota GR010 Hybrid	(Switzerland) Sébastien Buemi (New Zealand) Brendon Hartley (Japan) Ryō Hirakawa	Hypercar	380	15th	15th
2026	(Japan) Toyota Racing	7	Toyota TR010 Hybrid	(United Kingdom) Mike Conway (Japan) Kamui Kobayashi (Netherlands) Nyck de Vries	Hypercar	381	1st	1st
2026	(Japan) Toyota Racing	8	Toyota TR010 Hybrid	(Switzerland) Sébastien Buemi (New Zealand) Brendon Hartley (Japan) Ryō Hirakawa	Hypercar	381	3rd	3rd

==== FIA World Endurance Championship results ====
Full-season entry	Third manufacturer entry
* Eligible for all championship points	* Eligible for Drivers' championship points * Only eligible for Manufacturers' championship points at Le Mans

Year	Entrant	Class	Car	Engine	No.	Drivers	1	2	3	4	5	6	7	8	9	Pts.	Pos.
2012	(Japan) Toyota Racing	LMP1	Toyota TS030 Hybrid	Toyota RV8KLM 3.4 L V8	7	(Austria) Alexander Wurz (France) Nicolas Lapierre (Japan) Kazuki Nakajima	SEB	SPA	LMS; Ret	SIL; 2	SÃO; 1	BHR; Ret	FUJ; 1	SHA; 1		96	2nd
2012	(Japan) Toyota Racing	LMP1	Toyota TS030 Hybrid	Toyota RV8KLM 3.4 L V8	8	(United Kingdom) Anthony Davidson (Switzerland) Sébastien Buemi (France) Stéphane Sarrazin			LMS; Ret							96	2nd
2013	(Japan) Toyota Racing	LMP1	Toyota TS030 Hybrid	Toyota RV8KLM 3.4 L V8	7	(Austria) Alexander Wurz (France) Nicolas Lapierre (Japan) Kazuki Nakajima	SIL; 4	SPA; Ret	LMS; 4			FUJ; 1	SHA; 2	BHR; Ret		142.5	2nd
2013	(Japan) Toyota Racing	LMP1	Toyota TS030 Hybrid	Toyota RV8KLM 3.4 L V8	8	(United Kingdom) Anthony Davidson (Switzerland) Sébastien Buemi (France) Stéphane Sarrazin	SIL; 3	SPA; 4	LMS; 2	SÃO; Ret	COA; 2	FUJ; 27	SHA; Ret	BHR; 1		142.5	2nd
2014	(Japan) Toyota Racing	LMP1	Toyota TS040 Hybrid	Toyota RV8KLM 3.7 L V8	7	(Austria) Alexander Wurz (France) Stéphane Sarrazin (Japan) Kazuki Nakajima	SIL; 2	SPA; 3	LMS; Ret	COA; 6	FUJ; 2	SHA; 2	BHR; 1	SÃO; 4		289	1st
2014	(Japan) Toyota Racing	LMP1	Toyota TS040 Hybrid	Toyota RV8KLM 3.7 L V8	8	(United Kingdom) Anthony Davidson (Switzerland) Sébastien Buemi (France) Nicolas Lapierre	SIL; 1	SPA; 1	LMS; 3	COA; 3	FUJ; 1	SHA; 1	BHR; 11	SÃO; 2		289	1st
2015	(Japan) Toyota Racing	LMP1	Toyota TS040 Hybrid	Toyota RV8KLM 3.7 L V8	1	(United Kingdom) Anthony Davidson (Switzerland) Sébastien Buemi (Japan) Kazuki Nakajima	SIL; 3	SPA; 4	LMS; 8	NÜR; 5	COA; 4	FUJ; 5	SHA; 6	BHR; 4		164	3rd
2015	(Japan) Toyota Racing	LMP1	Toyota TS040 Hybrid	Toyota RV8KLM 3.7 L V8	2	(Austria) Alexander Wurz (France) Stéphane Sarrazin (United Kingdom) Mike Conway	SIL; 4	SPA; 6	LMS; 6	NÜR; 6	COA; Ret	FUJ; 6	SHA; 5	BHR; 3		164	3rd
2016	(Japan) Toyota Gazoo Racing	LMP1	Toyota TS050 Hybrid	Toyota H8909 2.4 L Turbo V6	5	(United Kingdom) Anthony Davidson (Switzerland) Sébastien Buemi (Japan) Kazuki Nakajima	SIL; 16	SPA; 17	LMS; NC	NÜR; 5	MEX; Ret	COA; 5	FUJ; 4	SHA; 3	BHR; 4	229	3rd
2016	(Japan) Toyota Gazoo Racing	LMP1	Toyota TS050 Hybrid	Toyota H8909 2.4 L Turbo V6	6	(France) Stéphane Sarrazin (United Kingdom) Mike Conway (Japan) Kamui Kobayashi	SIL; 2	SPA; Ret	LMS; 2	NÜR; 6	MEX; 3	COA; 3	FUJ; 1	SHA; 2	BHR; 5	229	3rd
2017	(Japan) Toyota Gazoo Racing	LMP1	Toyota TS050 Hybrid	Toyota H8909 2.4 L Turbo V6	7	(United Kingdom) Mike Conway (Japan) Kamui Kobayashi (Argentina) José María López 1, 4-9 (France) Stéphane Sarrazin 3	SIL; 23	SPA; 2	LMS; Ret	NÜR; 3	MEX; 4	COA; 4	FUJ; 2	SHA; 4	BHR; 4	286.5	2nd
2017	(Japan) Toyota Gazoo Racing	LMP1	Toyota TS050 Hybrid	Toyota H8909 2.4 L Turbo V6	8	(Switzerland) Sébastien Buemi (United Kingdom) Anthony Davidson 1-5, 7-9 (Japan) Kazuki Nakajima (France) Stéphane Sarrazin 6	SIL; 1	SPA; 1	LMS; 6	NÜR; 4	MEX; 3	COA; 3	FUJ; 1	SHA; 1	BHR; 1	286.5	2nd
2017	(Japan) Toyota Gazoo Racing	LMP1	Toyota TS050 Hybrid	Toyota H8909 2.4 L Turbo V6	9	(France) Nicolas Lapierre (Japan) Yuji Kunimoto (France) Stéphane Sarrazin 2 (Argentina) José María López 3		SPA; 5	LMS; Ret							286.5	2nd
2018-19	(Japan) Toyota Gazoo Racing	LMP1	Toyota TS050 Hybrid	Toyota H8909 2.4 L Turbo V6	7	(United Kingdom) Mike Conway (Japan) Kamui Kobayashi (Argentina) José María López	SPA; 2	LMS; 2	SIL; DSQ	FUJ; 1	SHA; 1	SEB; 2	SPA; 6	LMS; 2		216	1st
2018-19	(Japan) Toyota Gazoo Racing	LMP1	Toyota TS050 Hybrid	Toyota H8909 2.4 L Turbo V6	8	(Switzerland) Sébastien Buemi (Japan) Kazuki Nakajima (Spain) Fernando Alonso	SPA; 1	LMS; 1	SIL; DSQ	FUJ; 2	SHA; 2	SEB; 1	SPA; 1	LMS; 1		216	1st
2019-20	(Japan) Toyota Gazoo Racing	LMP1	Toyota TS050 Hybrid	Toyota H8909 2.4 L Turbo V6	7	(United Kingdom) Mike Conway (Japan) Kamui Kobayashi (Argentina) José María López	SIL; 1	FUJ; 2	SHA; 3	BHR; 1	COA; 3	SPA; 1	LMS; 3	BHR; 1		241	1st
2019-20	(Japan) Toyota Gazoo Racing	LMP1	Toyota TS050 Hybrid	Toyota H8909 2.4 L Turbo V6	8	(Switzerland) Sébastien Buemi (Japan) Kazuki Nakajima (New Zealand) Brendon Hartley	SIL; 2	FUJ; 1	SHA; 2	BHR; 2	COA; 2	SPA; 2	LMS; 1	BHR; 2		241	1st
2021	(Japan) Toyota Gazoo Racing	Hypercar	Toyota GR010 Hybrid	Toyota H8909 3.5 L Turbo V6	7	(United Kingdom) Mike Conway (Japan) Kamui Kobayashi (Argentina) José María López	SPA; 3	POR; 2	MNZ; 1	LMS; 1	BHR; 1	BHR; 2				206	1st
2021	(Japan) Toyota Gazoo Racing	Hypercar	Toyota GR010 Hybrid	Toyota H8909 3.5 L Turbo V6	8	(Switzerland) Sébastien Buemi (Japan) Kazuki Nakajima (New Zealand) Brendon Hartley	SPA; 1	POR; 1	MNZ; 4	LMS; 2	BHR; 2	BHR; 1				206	1st
2022	(Japan) Toyota Gazoo Racing	Hypercar	Toyota GR010 Hybrid	Toyota H8909 3.5 L Turbo V6	7	(United Kingdom) Mike Conway (Japan) Kamui Kobayashi (Argentina) José María López	SEB; Ret	SPA; 1	LMS; 2	MNZ; 3	FUJ; 2	BHR; 1				186	1st
2022	(Japan) Toyota Gazoo Racing	Hypercar	Toyota GR010 Hybrid	Toyota H8909 3.5 L Turbo V6	8	(Switzerland) Sébastien Buemi (Japan) Ryō Hirakawa (New Zealand) Brendon Hartley	SEB; 2	SPA; Ret	LMS; 1	MNZ; 2	FUJ; 1	BHR; 2				186	1st
2023	(Japan) Toyota Gazoo Racing	Hypercar	Toyota GR010 Hybrid	Toyota H8909 3.5 L Turbo V6	7	(United Kingdom) Mike Conway (Japan) Kamui Kobayashi (Argentina) José María López	SEB; 1	POR; 9	SPA; 1	LMS; Ret	MNZ; 1	FUJ; 1	BHR; 2			217	1st
2023	(Japan) Toyota Gazoo Racing	Hypercar	Toyota GR010 Hybrid	Toyota H8909 3.5 L Turbo V6	8	(Switzerland) Sébastien Buemi (Japan) Ryō Hirakawa (New Zealand) Brendon Hartley	SEB; 2	POR; 1	SPA; 2	LMS; 2	MNZ; 6	FUJ; 2	BHR; 1			217	1st
2024	(Japan) Toyota Gazoo Racing	Hypercar	Toyota GR010 Hybrid	Toyota H8909 3.5 L Turbo V6	7	(United Kingdom) Mike Conway 1-3, 5-8 (Japan) Kamui Kobayashi (Netherlands) Nyck de Vries (Argentina) José María López4	QAT; 5	IMO; 1	SPA; 7	LMS; 2	SÃO; 4	COA; 2	FUJ; Ret	BHR; Ret		190	1st
2024	(Japan) Toyota Gazoo Racing	Hypercar	Toyota GR010 Hybrid	Toyota H8909 3.5 L Turbo V6	8	(Switzerland) Sébastien Buemi (Japan) Ryō Hirakawa (New Zealand) Brendon Hartley	QAT; 8	IMO; 5	SPA; 6	LMS; 5	SÃO; 1	COA; 15	FUJ; 10	BHR; 1		190	1st
2025	(Japan) Toyota Gazoo Racing	Hypercar	Toyota GR010 Hybrid	Toyota H8909 3.5 L Turbo V6	7	(United Kingdom) Mike Conway 1-5, 7-8 (Japan) Kamui Kobayashi (Netherlands) Nyck de Vries (Argentina) José María López 6	QAT; 6	IMO; 7	SPA; 7	LMS; 5	SÃO; 14	COA; 14	FUJ; 7	BHR; 1		171	2nd
2025	(Japan) Toyota Gazoo Racing	Hypercar	Toyota GR010 Hybrid	Toyota H8909 3.5 L Turbo V6	8	(Switzerland) Sébastien Buemi (Japan) Ryō Hirakawa (New Zealand) Brendon Hartley	QAT; 5	IMO; 5	SPA; 4	LMS; 14	SÃO; 15	COA; 9	FUJ; 16	BHR; 2		171	2nd
2026	(Japan) Toyota Racing	Hypercar	Toyota TR010 Hybrid	Toyota H8909 3.5 L Turbo V6	7	(United Kingdom) Mike Conway (Japan) Kamui Kobayashi (Netherlands) Nyck de Vries	IMO; 3	SPA; 5	LMS; 1	SÃO; 12	COA; Ret	FUJ; 8	CAT	MNZ		169*	1st*
2026	(Japan) Toyota Racing	Hypercar	Toyota TR010 Hybrid	Toyota H8909 3.5 L Turbo V6	8	(Switzerland) Sébastien Buemi (Japan) Ryō Hirakawa (New Zealand) Brendon Hartley	IMO; 1	SPA; 10	LMS; 3	SÃO; 17	COA; 6	FUJ; 1	CAT	MNZ		169*	1st*

* Season still in progress.

==== Race Victories ====
Year	Series	Race	Track	Car	Car #	Category
2012	WEC	6 Hours of São Paulo	(Brazil) Interlagos Circuit	Toyota TS030 Hybrid	7	LMP1
2012	WEC	6 Hours of Fuji	(Japan) Fuji Speedway	Toyota TS030 Hybrid	7	LMP1
2012	WEC	6 Hours of Shanghai	(China) Shanghai International Circuit	Toyota TS030 Hybrid	7	LMP1
2013	WEC	6 Hours of Fuji	(Japan) Fuji Speedway	Toyota TS030 Hybrid	7	LMP1
2013	WEC	6 Hours of Bahrain	Bahrain International Circuit	Toyota TS030 Hybrid	8	LMP1
2014	WEC	6 Hours of Silverstone	(United Kingdom) Silverstone Circuit	Toyota TS040 Hybrid	8	LMP1-H
2014	WEC	6 Hours of Spa-Francorchamps	(Belgium) Circuit de Spa-Francorchamps	Toyota TS040 Hybrid	8	LMP1-H
2014	WEC	6 Hours of Fuji	(Japan) Fuji Speedway	Toyota TS040 Hybrid	8	LMP1-H
2014	WEC	6 Hours of Shanghai	(China) Shanghai International Circuit	Toyota TS040 Hybrid	8	LMP1-H
2014	WEC	6 Hours of Bahrain	Bahrain International Circuit	Toyota TS040 Hybrid	7	LMP1-H
2016	WEC	6 Hours of Fuji	(Japan) Fuji Speedway	Toyota TS050 Hybrid	6	LMP1
2017	WEC	6 Hours of Silverstone	(United Kingdom) Silverstone Circuit	Toyota TS050 Hybrid	8	LMP1
2017	WEC	6 Hours of Spa-Francorchamps	(Belgium) Circuit de Spa-Francorchamps	Toyota TS050 Hybrid	8	LMP1
2017	WEC	6 Hours of Fuji	(Japan) Fuji Speedway	Toyota TS050 Hybrid	8	LMP1
2017	WEC	6 Hours of Shanghai	(China) Shanghai International Circuit	Toyota TS050 Hybrid	8	LMP1
2017	WEC	6 Hours of Bahrain	Bahrain International Circuit	Toyota TS050 Hybrid	8	LMP1
2018	WEC	6 Hours of Spa-Francorchamps	(Belgium) Circuit de Spa-Francorchamps	Toyota TS050 Hybrid	8	LMP1
2018	WEC	24 Hours of Le Mans	(France) Circuit de la Sarthe	Toyota TS050 Hybrid	8	LMP1
2018	WEC	6 Hours of Fuji	(Japan) Fuji Speedway	Toyota TS050 Hybrid	7	LMP1
2018	WEC	6 Hours of Shanghai	(China) Shanghai International Circuit	Toyota TS050 Hybrid	7	LMP1
2019	WEC	1,000 Miles of Sebring	(United States) Sebring International Raceway	Toyota TS050 Hybrid	8	LMP1
2019	WEC	6 Hours of Spa-Francorchamps	(Belgium) Circuit de Spa-Francorchamps	Toyota TS050 Hybrid	8	LMP1
2019	WEC	24 Hours of Le Mans	(France) Circuit de la Sarthe	Toyota TS050 Hybrid	8	LMP1
2019	WEC	4 Hours of Silverstone	(United Kingdom) Silverstone Circuit	Toyota TS050 Hybrid	7	LMP1
2019	WEC	6 Hours of Fuji	(Japan) Fuji Speedway	Toyota TS050 Hybrid	8	LMP1
2019	WEC	8 Hours of Bahrain	Bahrain International Circuit	Toyota TS050 Hybrid	7	LMP1
2020	WEC	6 Hours of Spa-Francorchamps	(Belgium) Circuit de Spa-Francorchamps	Toyota TS050 Hybrid	7	LMP1
2020	WEC	24 Hours of Le Mans	(France) Circuit de la Sarthe	Toyota TS050 Hybrid	8	LMP1
2020	WEC	8 Hours of Bahrain	Bahrain International Circuit	Toyota TS050 Hybrid	7	LMP1
2021	WEC	6 Hours of Spa-Francorchamps	(Belgium) Circuit de Spa-Francorchamps	Toyota GR010 Hybrid	8	Hypercar
2021	WEC	8 Hours of Portimão	(Portugal) Algarve International Circuit	Toyota GR010 Hybrid	8	Hypercar
2021	WEC	6 Hours of Monza	(Italy) Monza Circuit	Toyota GR010 Hybrid	7	Hypercar
2021	WEC	24 Hours of Le Mans	(France) Circuit de la Sarthe	Toyota GR010 Hybrid	7	Hypercar
2021	WEC	6 Hours of Bahrain	Bahrain International Circuit	Toyota GR010 Hybrid	7	Hypercar
2021	WEC	8 Hours of Bahrain	Bahrain International Circuit	Toyota GR010 Hybrid	8	Hypercar
2022	WEC	6 Hours of Spa-Francorchamps	(Belgium) Circuit de Spa-Francorchamps	Toyota GR010 Hybrid	7	Hypercar
2022	WEC	24 Hours of Le Mans	(France) Circuit de la Sarthe	Toyota GR010 Hybrid	8	Hypercar
2022	WEC	6 Hours of Fuji	(Japan) Fuji Speedway	Toyota GR010 Hybrid	8	Hypercar
2022	WEC	8 Hours of Bahrain	Bahrain International Circuit	Toyota GR010 Hybrid	7	Hypercar
2023	WEC	1,000 Miles of Sebring	(United States) Sebring International Raceway	Toyota GR010 Hybrid	7	Hypercar
2023	WEC	6 Hours of Portimão	(Portugal) Algarve International Circuit	Toyota GR010 Hybrid	8	Hypercar
2023	WEC	6 Hours of Spa-Francorchamps	(Belgium) Circuit de Spa-Francorchamps	Toyota GR010 Hybrid	7	Hypercar
2023	WEC	6 Hours of Monza	(Italy) Monza Circuit	Toyota GR010 Hybrid	7	Hypercar
2023	WEC	6 Hours of Fuji	(Japan) Fuji Speedway	Toyota GR010 Hybrid	7	Hypercar
2023	WEC	8 Hours of Bahrain	Bahrain International Circuit	Toyota GR010 Hybrid	8	Hypercar
2024	WEC	6 Hours of Imola	(Italy) Imola Circuit	Toyota GR010 Hybrid	7	Hypercar
2024	WEC	6 Hours of São Paulo	(Brazil) Interlagos Circuit	Toyota GR010 Hybrid	8	Hypercar
2024	WEC	8 Hours of Bahrain	Bahrain International Circuit	Toyota GR010 Hybrid	8	Hypercar
2025	WEC	8 Hours of Bahrain	Bahrain International Circuit	Toyota GR010 Hybrid	7	Hypercar
2026	WEC	6 Hours of Imola	(Italy) Imola Circuit	Toyota TR010 Hybrid	8	Hypercar
2026	WEC	24 Hours of Le Mans	(France) Circuit de la Sarthe	Toyota TR010 Hybrid	7	Hypercar
2026	WEC	6 Hours of Fuji	(Japan) Fuji Speedway	Toyota TR010 Hybrid	8	Hypercar
2026	WEC	6 Hours of Barcelona	(Spain) Circuit de Barcelona-Catalunya	Toyota TR010 Hybrid	8	Hypercar

== Other activities ==
=== TMG EV P001 electric car ===
The company revealed in its annual review that it has developed an electric racing car based on the Radical sportscar, along with Cologne company e-Wolf. The TMG EV P001 was developed using knowledge Toyota Motorsport gained during its KERS development for F1 and used some of the company's dedicated engine dynos, including an 'EV component test rig'. In August 2011 it set a new lap record for an electric vehicle at the Nürburgring Nordschleife of 7mins 47.794secs. The company says this proves the ability of their technology to be competitive in racing, and that they would like to enter an electric championship.

== See also ==
- Toyota in motorsport
