= OAK Racing =

French auto racing team

(France) OAK Racing
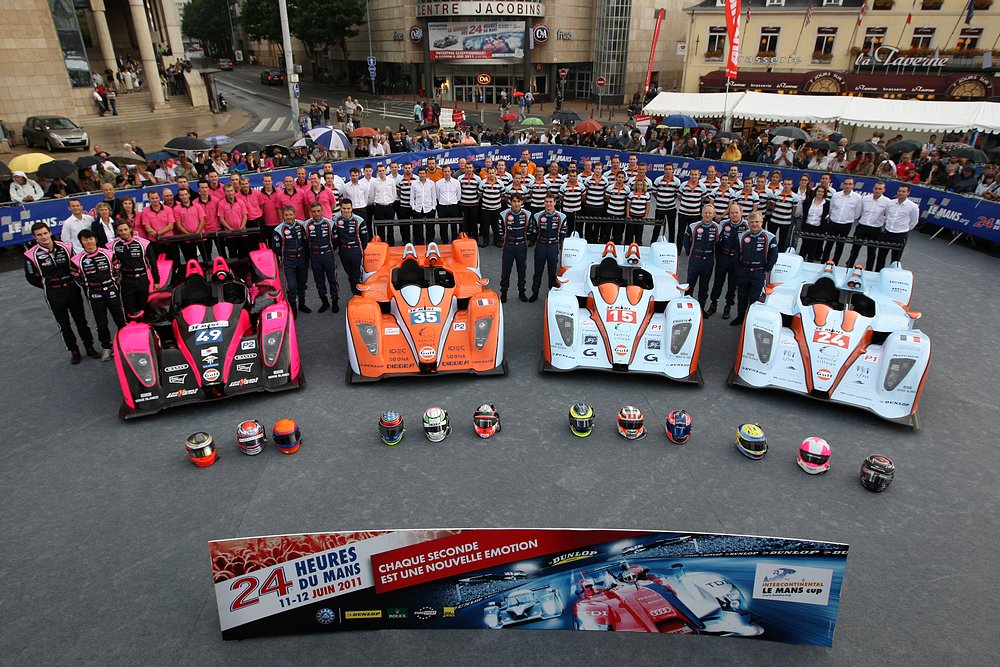
- Founded: 1980
- Team principal(s): Jacques Nicolet (2007–present)
- Former series: Asian Le Mans Series; French F3; FIA World Endurance Championship
- Noted drivers: (France) Oliver Pla (France) Julien Canal (Russia) Roman Rusinov (Denmark) David Heinemeier Hansson
- Teams' Championships: 2013 FIA WEC LMP2 class
- Drivers' Championships: 2013 (Baguette, Plowman, González)

OAK Racing is an endurance racing team specialising in sports prototypes based in Le Mans, France. In 2013 it won the 24 Hours of Le Mans in LMP2 class and the 2013 FIA WEC World Champion drivers and teams on LMP2 class.

In 2012 the team contested the FIA World Endurance Championship with LMP1 and LMP2 prototypes (including the blue riband Le Mans 24 Hours) as well as the European Le Mans Series, which caters for LMP2 cars only. After a number of successful years in the LMP2 class the team stepped up to the premier LMP1 category in 2011.

The teams livery colors are orange and blue racing livery of Gulf Oil in both championships through its partnership with CAR OIL, Gulf Lubricants’ exclusive distributor for France, Belgium and Luxembourg. Powered by Honda Performance Development (LMP1) and Nissan (LMP2) engines, OAK Racing has been the official LMP1 development team for Dunlop since 2009 and uses the company’s rubber in both prototype classes.

In 2012 OAK Racing became a racecar manufacturer through its Onroak Automotive division. Following the formation of its Design Office in 2010, the company was first responsible for the updated OAK/Pescarolo LMP1 that raced in 2011 before developing the all-new Morgan 2012 LMP2 to the ACO's cost capped regulations in time for the 2012 season. Privateer outfits have been able to purchase the chassis since December 2011.

Since late 2006 OAK Racing has been owned by entrepreneur and racing driver Jacques Nicolet via his holding company Everspeed.

== History ==
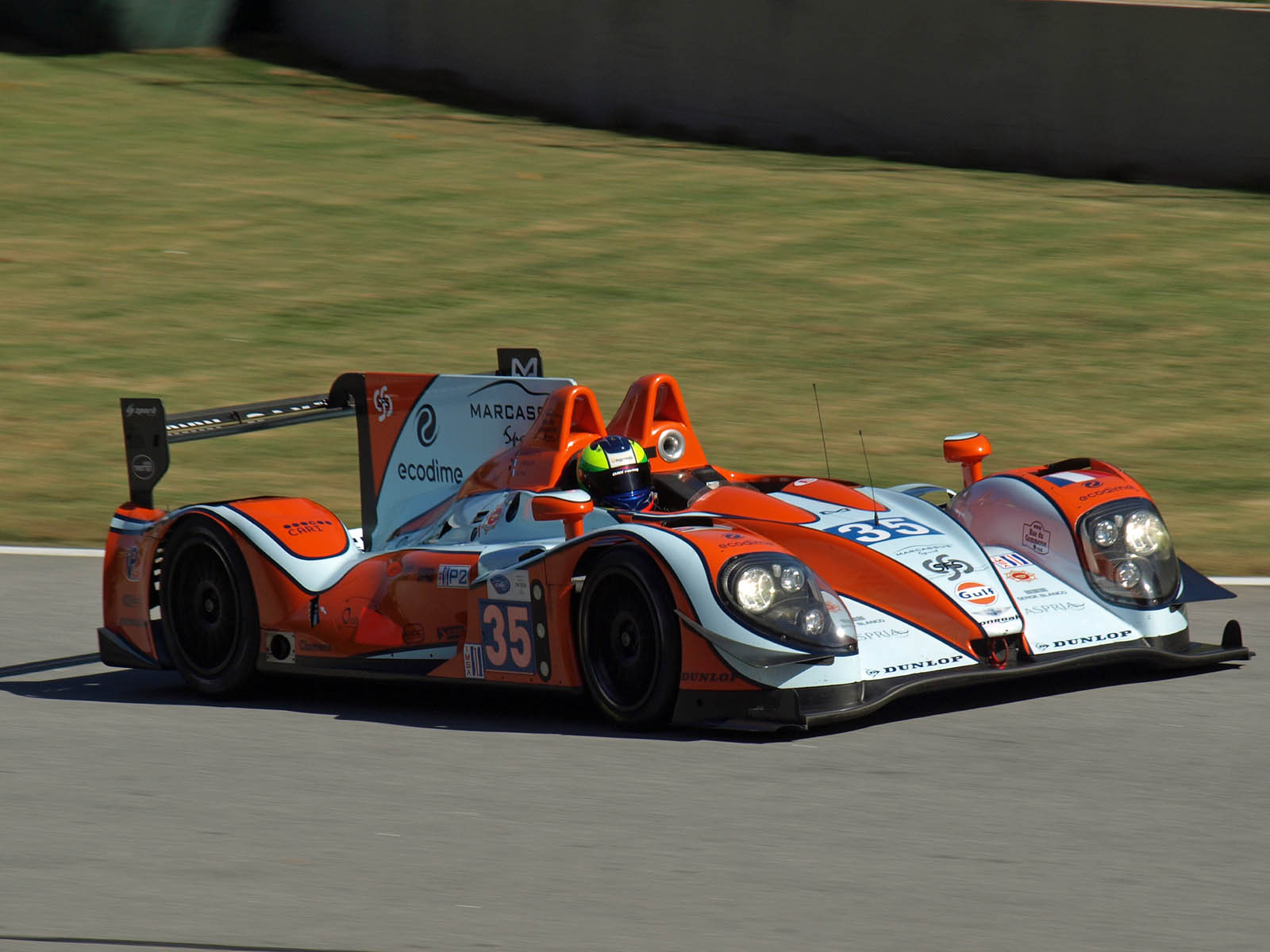
Olivier Pla in a Morgan 2012 LMP2-Nissan OAK Racing

Founded by Serge Saulnier in 1980, the team began life in the French Formula 3 championship as Promatecme before becoming Saulnier Racing in 2000 when it entered the World Series by Nissan and, later, its successor the World Series by Renault. In 2006 they switched their attention to sports-prototypes and the Le Mans Series, competing in the LMP1 category.

Nicolet assumed control of the team in late 2006, remaining in the LMS with a switch to the LMP2 class for the following season. In 2008 OAK Racing embarked on a more ambitious programme by fielding a pair of Pescarolo-Judds, one in LMP1 and another in LMP2. This was rewarded with a third place LMP2 class finish at the Le Mans 24 Hours where the team ran one of the youngest crews ever to contest the race at an average age 24, and also fielded the first Chinese driver ever to enter the event.

The team officially became OAK Racing in 2009. A partnership with Mazda Automobiles France was formed at this time with OAK Racing entering two Pescarolo-Mazda LMP2s in the 2009 Le Mans Series and Le Mans 24 Hours as well as participating in the two Asian Le Mans Series events at Japan’s Okayama circuit. By the end of the season the team had achieved six podiums from eight races, including a top-three LMP2 finish at the Le Mans 24 Hours and a victory in the Asian Le Mans Series.

In December 2009 OAK Racing reached an agreement with Pescarolo Sport to take over the manufacturing side of its business. Consequently, the development and construction of the chassis, bodywork and spare parts of the Pescarolo prototypes was assumed by OAK Racing, as well as all commercial activities.

In 2010 the team fielded two LMP2-spec Judd-powered OAK-Pescarolos in both the Le Mans Series and the Le Mans 24 Hours whilst also entering the ACO’s new Intercontinental Le Mans Cup. Their efforts were rewarded with numerous titles and podium finishes, including a third consecutive top-three finish at the 24 Hours in LM P2 (taking second and fourth places), four podiums from five LMS events, the ILMC LMP2 class title and the Michelin Green X Challenge trophy in the LMS and ILMC.

On 15 October 2010, during the asset sale of Pescarolo Sport, OAK Racing owner Nicolet and Prestige Racing’s Joël Rivière joined forces to purchase the lots, later presenting them to Henri Pescarolo and thus allowing him to revive his team.

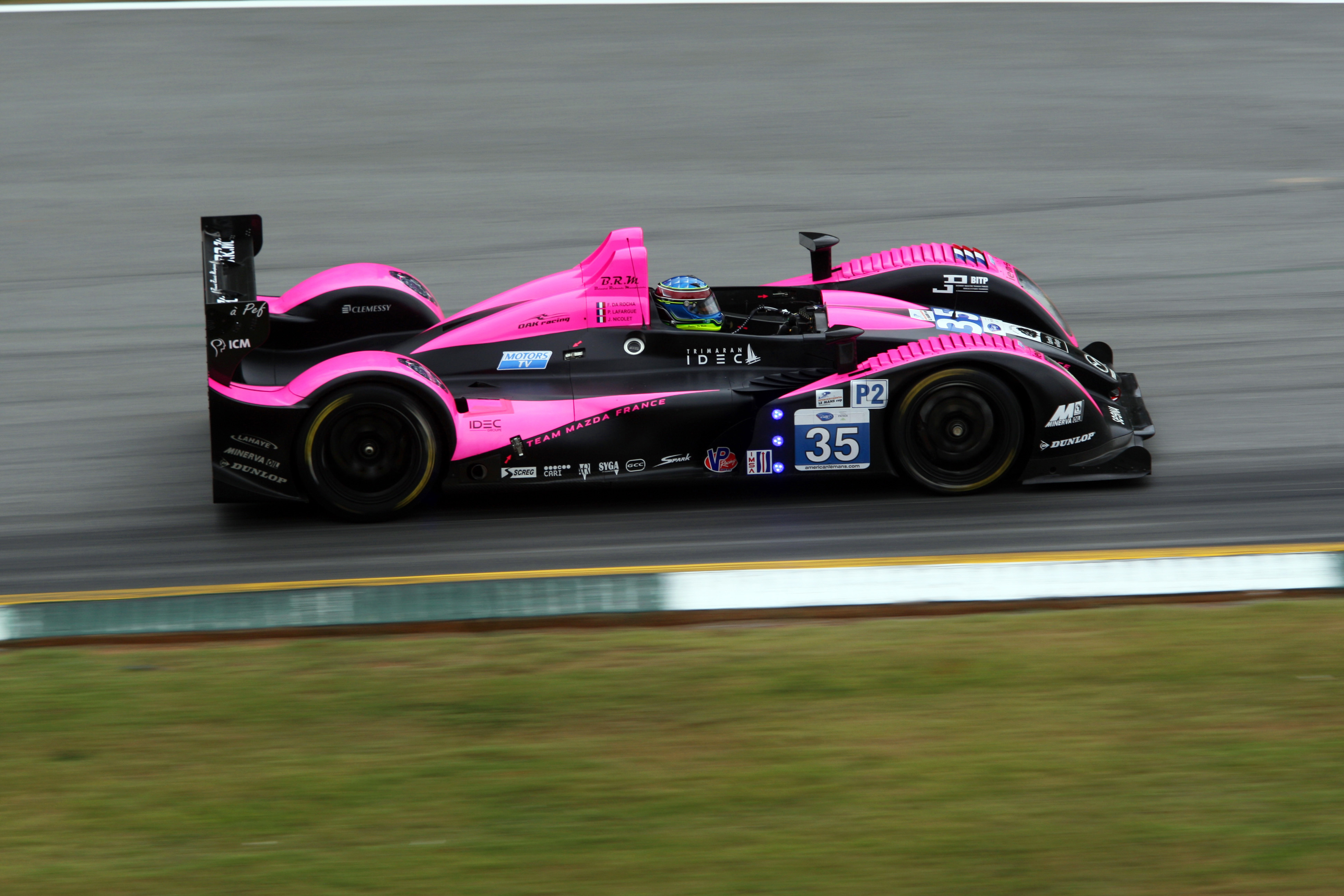
Petit Le Mans race, 2010

For the 2011 season the team entered two OAK-Pescarolo LMP1 prototypes and capped the Intercontinental Le Mans Cup season with a third place overall finish at the 6 Hours of Silverstone. OAK Racing entered as well one OAK-Pescarolo, LMP2 in the ILMC and an additional LMP2 for the Le Mans 24 Hours. Meanwhile, the team also finished 2nd overall in the LMP2 class standings.

For 2012 OAK Racing split the design, manufacturing, and sales divisions of the team into an independent company named Onroak Automotive. Onroak launched a revised LMP2 that, as well as being raced by the team, would be made available for sale to privateer outfits ahead of the 2012 season. Following a partnership with the Morgan Motor Company, the car was branded as Morgan LMP2.

After a 20-year absence an FIA-sanctioned World Endurance Championship was revived in 2012. OAK Racing initially entered a single car in both prototype classes and saw its #24 Morgan-Judd 2012 LMP2 take pole position and finish second on debut at the season-opening 12 Hours of Sebring.

A second, Nissan-engined Morgan 2012 LMP2 (#35) was entered at the subsequent Spa, Le Mans 24 Hours, Silverstone, São Paulo and Bahrain rounds in a move that ultimately saw the #24 car also switch to Nissan power from the British round onwards. Meanwhile, numerous engine reliability issues prompted the team to withdraw its LMP1 car from the championship after Le Mans. Following the installation of a new HPD engine the car made its competitive WEC return for the two last rounds in Asia.

At the 2013 24 Hours of Le Mans, OAK Racing took the LMP2 class victory with a 1-2 finish (7th and 8th overall). Car No.35 first place, drivers Martin Plowman, Ricardo González and Bertrand Baguette. Car No. 24 second place, drivers Olivier Pla, Alex Brundle and David Heinemeier Hansson. Car No. 35 covered a total of 329 laps in the Circuit de la Sarthe. Car No. 24 one lap behind. The race was run in very difficult weather conditions and several serious accidents bringing out a record of twelve safety car caution periods.

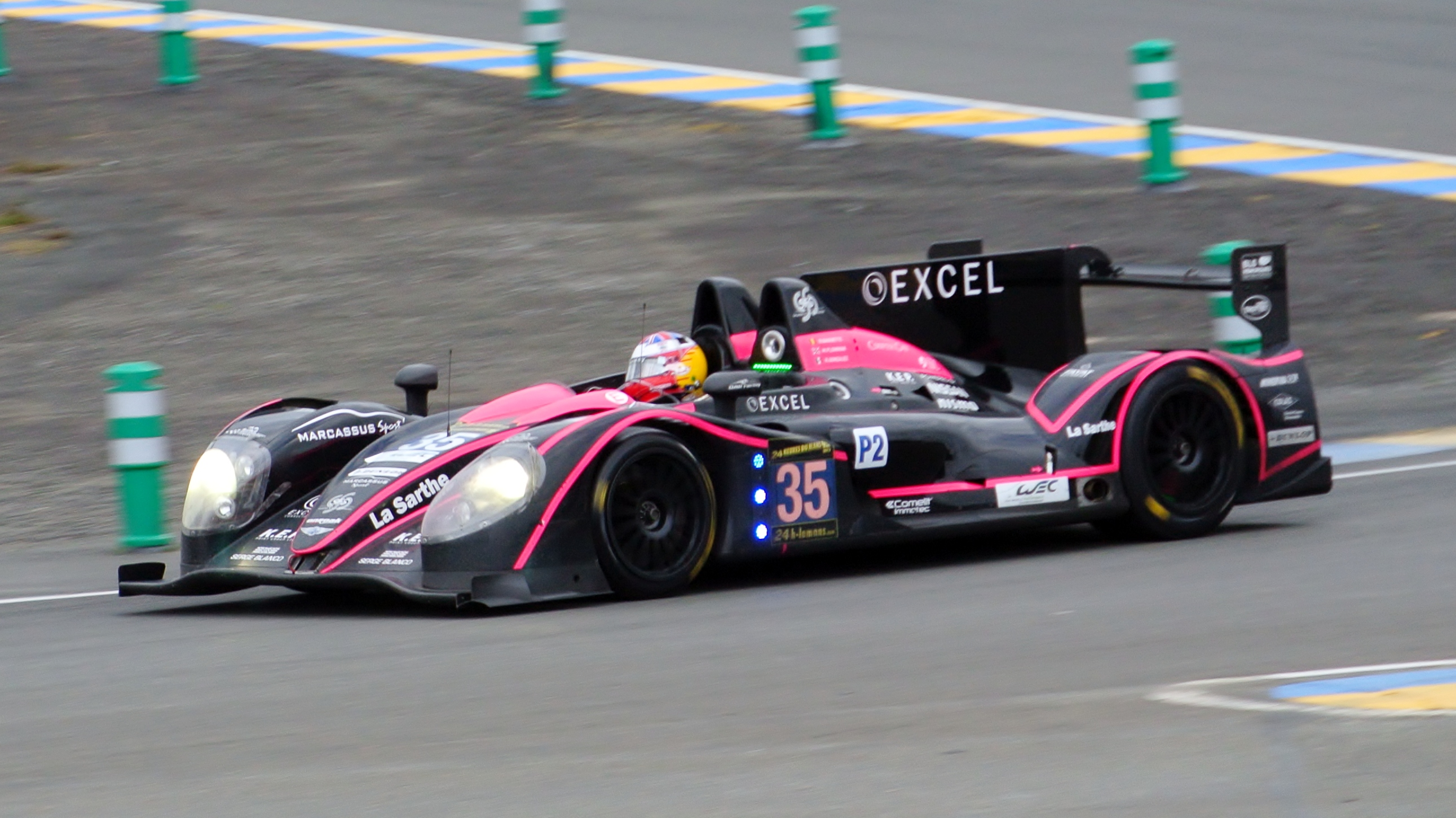
OAK Racing winner of the 2013 24 Hours of Le Mans LMP2 class (Plowman, González and Baguette).

OAK Racing earned both titles in the 2013 FIA World Endurance Championship, first and second places in the LMP2 Drivers and Teams Endurance Trophies class. Car No. 35 (Plowman, González and Baguette), first place and car No. 24 (Pla, Brundle and Hansson), second place.

For 2014, the team joined the newly formed United SportsCar Championship in the United States with full season drivers Olivier Pla and Gustavo Yacaman, winning their first race at Canadian Tire Motorsport Park.

== Drivers ==
=== 1980–2006: Serge Saulnier as president ===
* (France) Didier André (F3)	* (France) Alain Filhol (LM, LMS)	* (France) Simon Pagenaud (WSR)
* (Brazil) Enrique Bernoldi (F3)	* (Japan) Ryo Fukuda (F3, WSR)	* (France) Olivier Pla (F3)
* (France) Bruno Besson (F3)	* (France) Tristan Gommendy (F3, WSR)	* (United Kingdom) Andy Priaulx (F3)
* (United Kingdom) Jenson Button (F3)	* (France) Bruce Jouanny (F3, LM)	* (Switzerland) Harold Primat (WSR, LMS)
* (France) Emmanuel Clérico (F3)	* (France) Franck Lagorce (F3)	* (France) Christophe Tinseau (F3)
* (Brazil) Aluizio Coelho (F3)	* (France) Nicolas Minassian (F3)
* (Switzerland) Marcel Fässler (LMS)	* (France) Jacques Nicolet (LM, LMS)

=== Since 2007: Jacques Nicolet as president ===
* (Monaco) Karim Aljani (LMS, LM)	* (Denmark) David Heinemeier Hansson (LM, LMS, WEC)	* (Japan) Shinji Nakano (LM)
* (Belgium) Andrea Barlesi (ILMC)	* (France) Bruce Jouanny (LM)	* (France) Jacques Nicolet (LM, LMS, ILMC, WEC)
* (Belgium) Bertrand Baguette (WEC)	* (Austria) Dominik Kraihamer (WEC)	* (France) Olivier Pla (ILMC, WEC, USCC)
* (United Kingdom) Alex Brundle (WEC, USCC)	* (France) Patrice Lafargue (ILMC)	* (France) Alexandre Prémat (LMS, ILMC)
* (Czech Republic) Jan Charouz (LM)	* (France) Matthieu Lahaye (LM, LMS, ILMC, WEC)	* (France) Pierre Ragues (LMS, LM, ILMC)
* (China) Cheng Cong Fu (LM)	* (Belgium) Bas Leinders	* (Japan) Takuma Sato (F1)
* (France) Frédéric Da Rocha (ILMC)	* (France) Guillaume Moreau (LM, LMS, ILMC, WEC)	* (Colombia) Gustavo Yacaman (USCC)
* (United Kingdom) Martin Plowman (WEC)	* (Japan) Keiko Ihara (WEC)	* (France) Jean-François Yvon (LM)
* (Belgium) Nicolas De Crem (LM)	* (France) Franck Montagny (F1, ILMC)
* (Monaco) Marc Faggionato (LM)	* (Belgium) Maxime Martin
* (France) Alain Filhol (LM, LMS)	* (Portugal) Tiago Monteiro (LM)
* (Monaco) Richard Hein (LM, LMS, ILMC)	* (Mexico) Ricardo González (WEC)

== Racing CV ==
=== As Promatecme ===
==== Single-seater ====
1992: French F3 champion with Franck Lagorce

1997: British Formula 3 Championship: 2nd (eight wins)

1998: British Formula 3 Championship: 2nd (six wins)

1999: British Formula 3 Championship: 3rd (three wins)

=== As Saulnier Racing ===
==== Single-seater ====
2001: French F3 champion with Ryo Fukuda

2004-2005: World Series by Renault

==== Endurance Racing ====
2006: Le Mans Series, 4th (two podiums) - As Swiss Spirit

2007: Le Mans Series, 4th in LMP2 (one podium) - Courage-AER LC75

2008: 24 Hours of Le Mans, 3rd in LMP2 and 12th in LMP1 - Pescarolo-Judd

2008: 5th in LMP2 (one podium) and 12th in LMP1 - Pescarolo-Judd

=== As OAK Racing ===
==== 2009 ====
Le Mans 24 Hours: 3rd in LMP2 - Pescarolo-Mazda

Asian Le Mans Series: winner in LMP2 (two wins) - Pescarolo-Mazda

Le Mans Series: 6th (two podiums) and 7th (one podium) in LMP2 - Pescarolo-Mazda

==== 2010 ====
Le Mans 24 Hours: 2nd and 4th in LMP2, 7th and 9th overall — Pescarolo-Judd

Le Mans Series: 3rd (one podium) and 4th (three podiums) in LMP2 - Pescarolo-Judd constructors’ title in LMP2

Intercontinental Le Mans Cup: winner in LMP2 (three podiums) - Pescarolo-Judd

Michelin Green X Challenge (Le Mans Series and ILMC): winner — Pescarolo-Judd

==== 2011 ====
Le Mans 24 Hours: 5th in LMP2 - OAK/Pescarolo-Judd

6 Hours of Silverstone: 3rd and 5th overall — OAK/Pescarolo-Judd

6 Hours of Zhuhai: Michelin Green X Challenge for the #24 LMP1 - OAK/Pescarolo-Judd

Intercontinental Le Mans Cup: 5th in LMP1 class, 2nd in LMP2 class (team ranking) - OAK/Pescarolo-Judd

2012 LMP2 Trophy

== 24 Hours of Le Mans results ==
Year	Entrant	No.	Car	Drivers	Class	Laps	Pos.	Class Pos.
2006	(Switzerland) Swiss Spirit	5	Courage LC70-Judd	(Switzerland) Marcel Fässler (Austria) Philipp Peter (Switzerland) Harold Primat	LMP1	132	DNF	DNF
2007	(Spain) Saulnier Racing	35	Courage LC75-AER	(France) Alain Filhol (France) Bruce Jouanny (France) Jacques Nicolet	LMP2	224	DNF	DNF
2008	(France) Saulnier Racing	4	Pescarolo 01-Judd	(Monaco) Marc Faggionato (Monaco) Richard Hein (France) Jacques Nicolet	LMP1	311	26th	12th
2008	(France) Saulnier Racing	35	Pescarolo 01-Judd	(China) Cheng Congfu (France) Matthieu Lahaye (France) Pierre Ragues	LMP2	333	18th	3rd
2009	OAK Racing; Team Mazda France	24	Pescarolo 01-Mazda	(Monaco) Richard Hein (France) Jacques Nicolet (France) Jean-François Yvon	LMP2	325	20th	3rd
2009	OAK Racing; Team Mazda France	35	Pescarolo 01-Mazda	(Switzerland) Karim Ajlani (France) Matthieu Lahaye (France) Guillaume Moreau	LMP2	208	DNF	DNF
2010	(France) OAK Racing	24	Pescarolo 01-Judd	(Monaco) Richard Hein (France) Jacques Nicolet (France) Jean-François Yvon	LMP2	341	9th	4th
2010	(France) OAK Racing	35	Pescarolo 01-Judd	(Czech Republic) Jan Charouz (France) Matthieu Lahaye (France) Guillaume Moreau	LMP2	361	7th	2nd
2011	(France) OAK Racing	15	OAK Pescarolo 01-Judd	(Portugal) Tiago Monteiro (France) Guillaume Moreau (France) Pierre Ragues	LMP1	80	DNF	DNF
2011	(France) OAK Racing	24	OAK Pescarolo 01-Judd	(Monaco) Richard Hein (France) Jacques Nicolet (France) Jean-François Yvon	LMP1	119	DNF	DNF
2011	(France) OAK Racing	35	OAK Pescarolo 01-Judd	(Italy) Andrea Barlesi (France) Frédéric Da Rocha (France) Patrice Lafargue	LMP2	288	25th	7th
2011	(France) OAK Racing	49	OAK Pescarolo 01-Judd	(Czech Republic) Jan Charouz (Belgium) Nicolas de Crem (Japan) Shinji Nakano	LMP2	313	14th	5th
2012	(France) OAK Racing	15	OAK Pescarolo 01-Judd	(Belgium) Bertrand Baguette (Austria) Dominik Kraihamer (France) Franck Montagny	LMP1	219	DNF	DNF
2012	(France) OAK Racing	24	Morgan LMP2-Judd	(France) Matthieu Lahaye (France) Jacques Nicolet (France) Olivier Pla	LMP2	139	DNF	DNF
2012	(France) OAK Racing	35	Morgan LMP2-Nissan	(Denmark) David Heinemeier Hansson (Belgium) Bas Leinders (Belgium) Maxime Martin	LMP2	341	14th	7th
2013	(France) OAK Racing	24	Morgan LMP2-Nissan	(United Kingdom) Alex Brundle (Denmark) David Heinemeier Hansson (France) Olivier Pla	LMP2	328	8th	2nd
2013	(France) OAK Racing	35	Morgan LMP2-Nissan	(Belgium) Bertrand Baguette (Mexico) Ricardo González (United Kingdom) Martin Plowman	LMP2	329	7th	1st
2013	(France) OAK Racing	45	Morgan LMP2-Nissan	(France) Jean-Marc Merlin (France) Philippe Mondolot (France) Jacques Nicolet	LMP2	246	DNF	DNF
2014	(Russia) G-Drive Racing	26	Morgan LMP2-Nissan	(France) Julien Canal (France) Olivier Pla (Russia) Roman Rusinov	LMP2	120	DNF	DNF
2014	(France) OAK Racing-Team Asia	33	Ligier JS P2-Honda	(United States) David Cheng (Hong Kong) Adderly Fong (China) Ho-Pin Tung	LMP2	347	12th	7th
2014	(France) OAK Racing	35	Ligier JS P2-Nissan	(United Kingdom) Alex Brundle (United Kingdom) Jann Mardenborough (Russia) Mark Shulzhitskiy	LMP2	354	9th	5th
2015	(Russia) G-Drive Racing	26	Ligier JS P2-Nissan	(United Kingdom) Sam Bird (France) Julien Canal (Russia) Roman Rusinov	LMP2	358	11th	3rd
2015	(Russia) G-Drive Racing	28	Ligier JS P2-Nissan	(Brazil) Pipo Derani (Mexico) Ricardo González (Colombia) Gustavo Yacamán	LMP2	354	12th	4th
2015	(France) OAK Racing	35	Ligier JS P2-Nissan	(France) Erik Maris (France) Jean-Marc Merlin (France) Jacques Nicolet	LMP2	328	29th	11th
2015	(France) OAK Racing	34	Ligier JS P2-Honda	(Canada) Chris Cumming (France) Kévin Estre (Belgium) Laurens Vanthoor	LMP2	329	DNF	DNF
2016	(United States) Extreme Speed Motorsports	30	Ligier JS P2-Nissan	(United States) Ed Brown (United States) Scott Sharp (United States) Johannes van Overbeek	LMP2	341	16th	11th
2016	(United States) Extreme Speed Motorsports	31	Ligier JS P2-Nissan	(Canada) Chris Cumming (United Kingdom) Ryan Dalziel (Brazil) Pipo Derani	LMP2	297	42nd	16th
2016	(Mexico) RGR Sport by Morand	43	Ligier JS P2-Nissan	(Portugal) Filipe Albuquerque (Mexico) Ricardo González (Brazil) Bruno Senna	LMP2	344	15th	10th
2016	(France) SRT41 by OAK Racing	84	Morgan LMP2-Nissan	(France) Jean-Bernard Bouvet (France) Frédéric Sausset (France) Christophe Tinseau	CDNT	315	38th	–
2017	(Philippines) Eurasia Motorsport	33	Ligier JS P217-Gibson	(France) Erik Maris (France) Jacques Nicolet (France) Pierre Nicolet	LMP2	341	15th	13th
2018	(China) Jackie Chan DC Racing	33	Ligier JS P217-Gibson	(United States) Nick Boulle (United States) David Cheng (France) Pierre Nicolet	LMP2	355	12th	8th
2018	(China) Jackie Chan DC Racing	34	Ligier JS P217-Gibson	(Denmark) David Heinemeier Hansson (France) Côme Ledogar (United States) Ricky Taylor	LMP2	195	DNF	DNF

== WeatherTech SportsCar Championship wins ==
#	Season	Date	Classes	Track / Race	No.	Winning drivers	Chassis	Engine
1	2014	July 13	Prototype	Mosport	42	(France) Olivier Pla / (Colombia) Gustavo Yacamán	Morgan LMP2	Nissan VK45DE 4.5 L V8
