= Everspeed =

French holding company

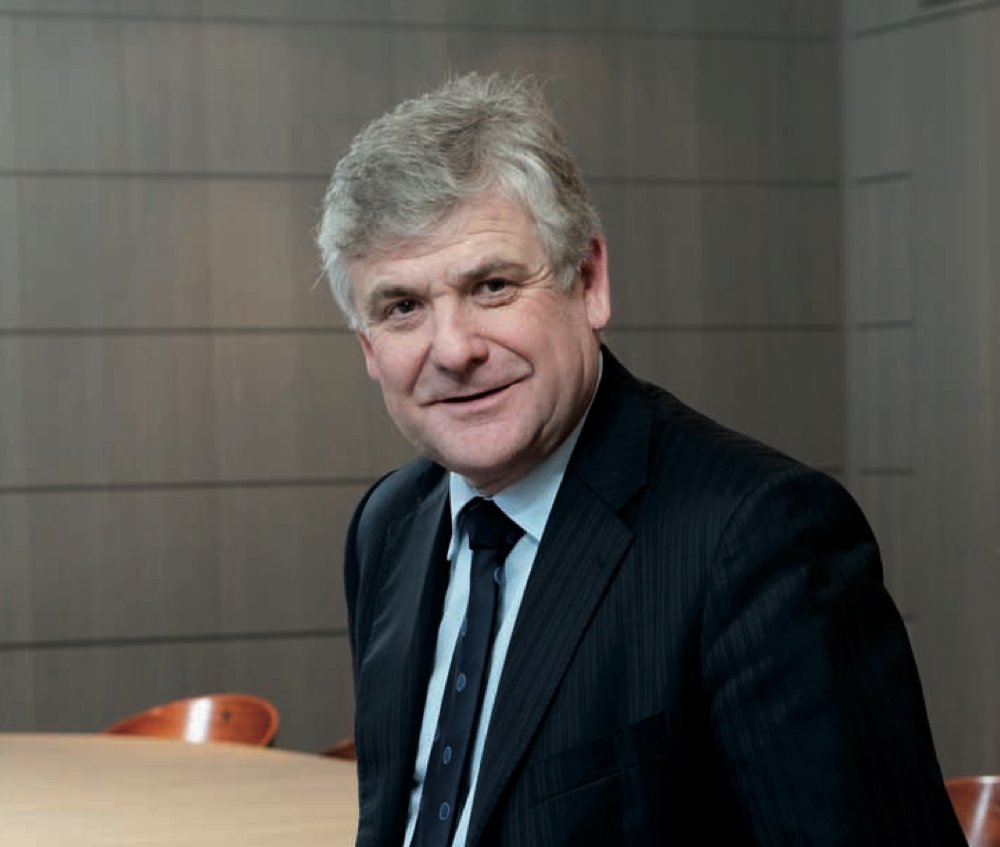
- Everspeed chairman Jacques Nicolet
- Formerly: JN Holding
- Company type: SASU
- Industry: Automotive
- Founded: December 14, 2007; 18 years ago
- Headquarters: 19 rue de Prony, Paris, France
- Revenue: ▼€ 2.213.700 (2016)
- Operating income: ▼€ -1.066.400 (2016)
- Net income: ▲€ 1.247.400 (2016)
- Total assets: ▲€ 78.253.600 (2016)
- Total equity: ▲€ 64.140.900 (2016)
- Website: everspeed.fr

Everspeed is a French holding company for motorsport related companies. The company was founded by Jacques Nicolet as JN Holding. The company was renamed as Everspeed in 2016.

== History ==
Locations of the Everspeed divisions in France

Jacques Nicolet took over Saulnier Racing in January 2007. He later founded JN Holding on 14 December 2007. Saulnier Racing was rebranded as OAK Racing in early 2009. The following year, Nicolet and business partner Joël Rivière bought the assets of Pescarolo Sport for €400,000. Until 2013, Pescarolo Sport kept competing in various endurance racing series under their own name. The assets were also used to start Onroak Automotive in 2012.

In 2016 the group bought the struggling engine builder Sodemo. Sodemo was owned by a number of shareholders. The companies founder Guillaume Maillard was a minority shareholder, while Luxembourg based private equity firm Finext was the majority shareholder.

== Divisions ==
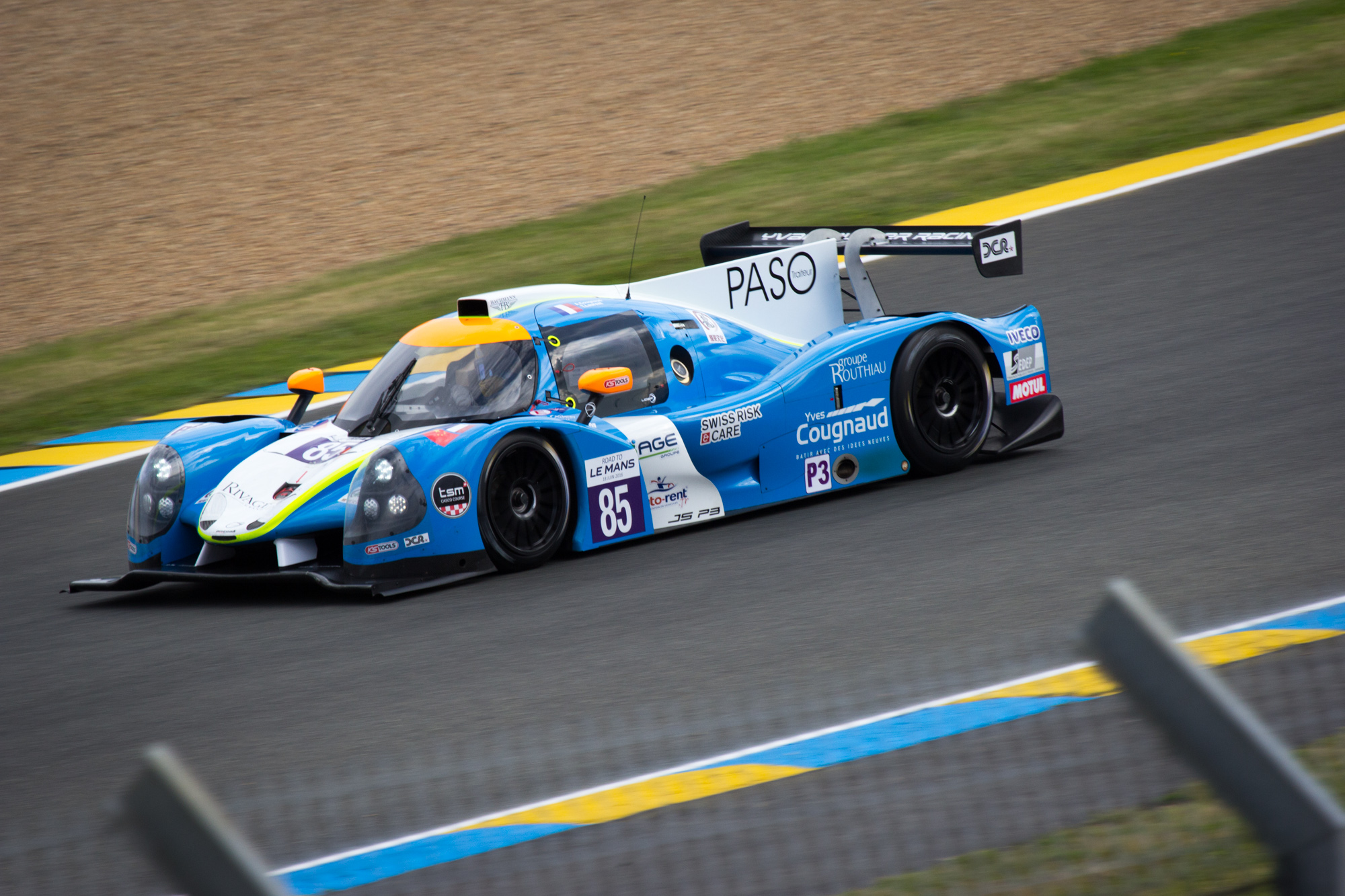
One of the Ligier JS P3 cars built by Onroak Automotive.

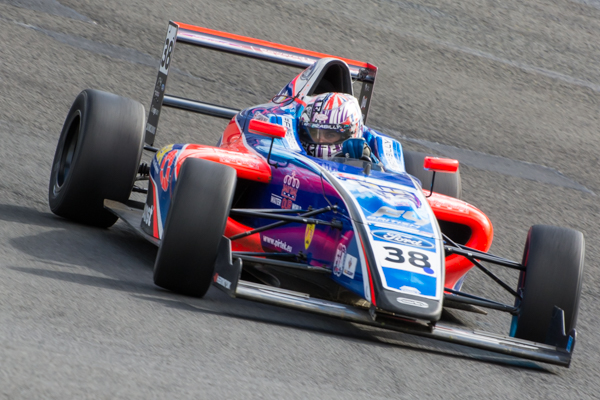
One of the Mygale M14-F4 cars built by Mygale.

- Motorsport
  - Onroak Automotive (ACO selected LMP3 constructor)
  - Mygale (50% ownership, FIA selected Formula 4 constructor.
  - Sodemo (engine development)
  - AOTech (racing simulators and aerodynamic development)
  - OAK Racing (racing team)
  - Marcassus Sport (official dealer for Lotus Cars, Morgan among others)
  - Les Deux Arbres (exploitation of Circuit du Val de Vienne)
- Learning
  - Ecodime (training of technical functions)
  - Ecodime Italia
- Composites
  - HP Composites (production of carbon fibre components)
- Connection
  - DPPI Images (sport images press agency)
  - Sportagraph (digital sports content creation)

== Purchases ==
Throughout the companies existence, Everspeed and its associates have included various companies in its divisions. Most notably:

=== Pescarolo Sport ===
After a number of disappointing racing seasons the assets of Pescarolo Sport were sold at auction in 2010. Jacques Nicolet and business partner Joël Rivière, with help from Hervé Poulain, acquired the assets for €400,000. Henri Pescarolo was again placed at the head of the rebranded Pescarolo Team. The team continued until 2014 when it was liquidated. In the meantime, the assets were used to form Onroak Automotive.

=== Ligier ===
In 2013 Onroak Automotive formed a partnership with Guy Ligier. Onroak would continue to build Ligier branded Le Mans Prototype racecars and Group CN prototypes.

=== Crawford Composites ===
American sportscar constructor Crawford Composites was bought by Onroak Automotive in 2016. Onroak took over construction of the Crawford FIA Formula 4 chassis.

=== Tork Engineering ===
French racecar constructor Tork Engineering was bought by Onroak Automotive in 2017. Tork Engineering built cars for the Mitjet Series as well as Dacia ice racing cars.
