= Jacques Nicolet =

French businessman and racing driver (born 1956)

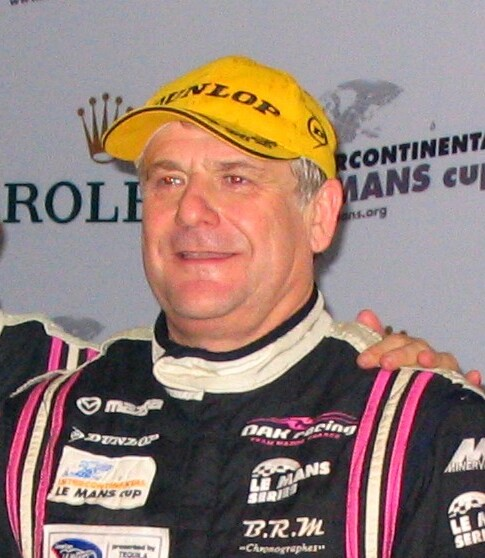
- Nicolet after winning the 2010 1000 km of Zhuhai
- Nationality: (France) French
- Born: Jacques Maurice Louis Nicolet; 5 April 1956 (age 70) Gigondas, France
- Categorisation: FIA Silver (until 2013); FIA Bronze (2014–)
24 Hours of Le Mans career
- Years: 2007 – 2013, 2015, 2017, 2018
- Teams: Saulnier Racing; OAK Racing
- Best finish: 3rd (20th overall) (2009)
- Class wins: 0

Jacques Maurice Louis Nicolet (born 5 April 1956 in Gigondas) is a French businessman and racing driver. He is the chairman of the Supervisory Board for Altarea SCA, a French real estate investment and development company, which he co-founded in 1994 with Alain Taravela. He was previously the director of development at the Pierre & Vacances Group between 1984 and 1994. Since 2017, Nicolet is also the owner and a driver of OAK Racing, a Le Mans 24 Hours and FIA World Endurance Championship racing team. In 2012, Nicolet founded Onroak Automotive, later rebranded Ligier Automotive.

== Racing career ==
Nicolet began his racing career in historic racing, competing in the V de V Historic Series between 2001 and 2006. In 2003, he formed Heritage Racing Cars, responsible for maintaining classic endurance sports cars. At the end of 2006, Nicolet bought Saulnier Racing. He began racing for the team in the Le Mans Series and at the 24 Hours of Le Mans. In 2008, he partnered with Henri Pescarolo of Pescarolo Sport to form Pescarolo Automobiles. In 2009, Nicolet established OAK Racing, with the Saulnier Racing operation becoming OAK Racing Mazda Team France and Heritage Racing Cars becoming OAK Racing Team Heritage.

== Racing record ==
=== 24 Hours of Le Mans results ===
Year	Team	Co-Drivers	Car	Class	Laps	Pos.	Class Pos.
2007	(France) Saulnier Racing	(France) Alain Filhol (France) Bruce Jouanny	Courage LC75-AER	LMP2	224	DNF	DNF
2008	(France) Saulnier Racing	(Monaco) Marc Faggionato (Monaco) Richard Hein	Pescarolo 01-Judd	LMP1	311	26th	12th
2009	OAK Racing; Team Mazda France	(Monaco) Richard Hein (France) Jean-François Yvon	Pescarolo 01-Mazda	LMP2	325	20th	3rd
2010	(France) OAK Racing	(Monaco) Richard Hein (France) Jean-François Yvon	Pescarolo 01-Judd	LMP2	341	9th	4th
2011	(France) OAK Racing	(Monaco) Richard Hein (France) Jean-François Yvon	OAK Pescarolo 01 Evo-Judd	LMP1	119	DNF	DNF
2012	(France) OAK Racing	(France) Matthieu Lahaye (France) Olivier Pla	Morgan LMP2-Judd	LMP2	139	DNF	DNF
2013	(France) OAK Racing	(France) Jean-Marc Merlin (France) Philippe Mondolot	Morgan LMP2-Nissan	LMP2	248	DNF	DNF
2015	(France) OAK Racing	(France) Jean-Marc Merlin (France) Erik Maris	Ligier JS P2-Nissan	LMP2	328	29th	11th
2017	(Philippines) Eurasia Motorsport	(France) Pierre Nicolet (France) Erik Maris	Ligier JS P217-Gibson	LMP2	341	15th	13th
2018	(China) Jackie Chan DC Racing	(China) David Cheng (United States) Nicholas Boulle	Ligier JS P217-Gibson	LMP2	355	12th	8th

=== Complete FIA World Endurance Championship results ===
Year	Entrant	Class	Car	Engine	1	2	3	4	5	6	7	8	Rank	Pts
2012	OAK Racing	LMP2	Morgan LMP2	Judd HK 3.6 L V8	SEB; 2	SPA; 5	LMS; Ret						20th	18.5
2012	OAK Racing	LMP2	Morgan LMP2	Nissan VK45DE 4.5 L V8				SIL; 6	SÃO; 3	BHR; 6	FUJ; 3	SHA; 3	20th	18.5
2013	OAK Racing	LMP2	Morgan LMP2	Nissan VK45DE 4.5 L V8	SIL; 8	SPA; 6	LMS; Ret	SÃO; 5	COA; 8	FUJ; 9	SHA; 6	BHR; 5	6th	51
2015	OAK Racing	LMP2	Ligier JS P2	Nissan VK45DE 4.5 L V8	SIL; 5	SPA; 6	LMS; 6	NÜR	COA	FUJ	SHA	BHR	26th	34
