= Richard Hein =

Monégasque racing driver (born 1958)

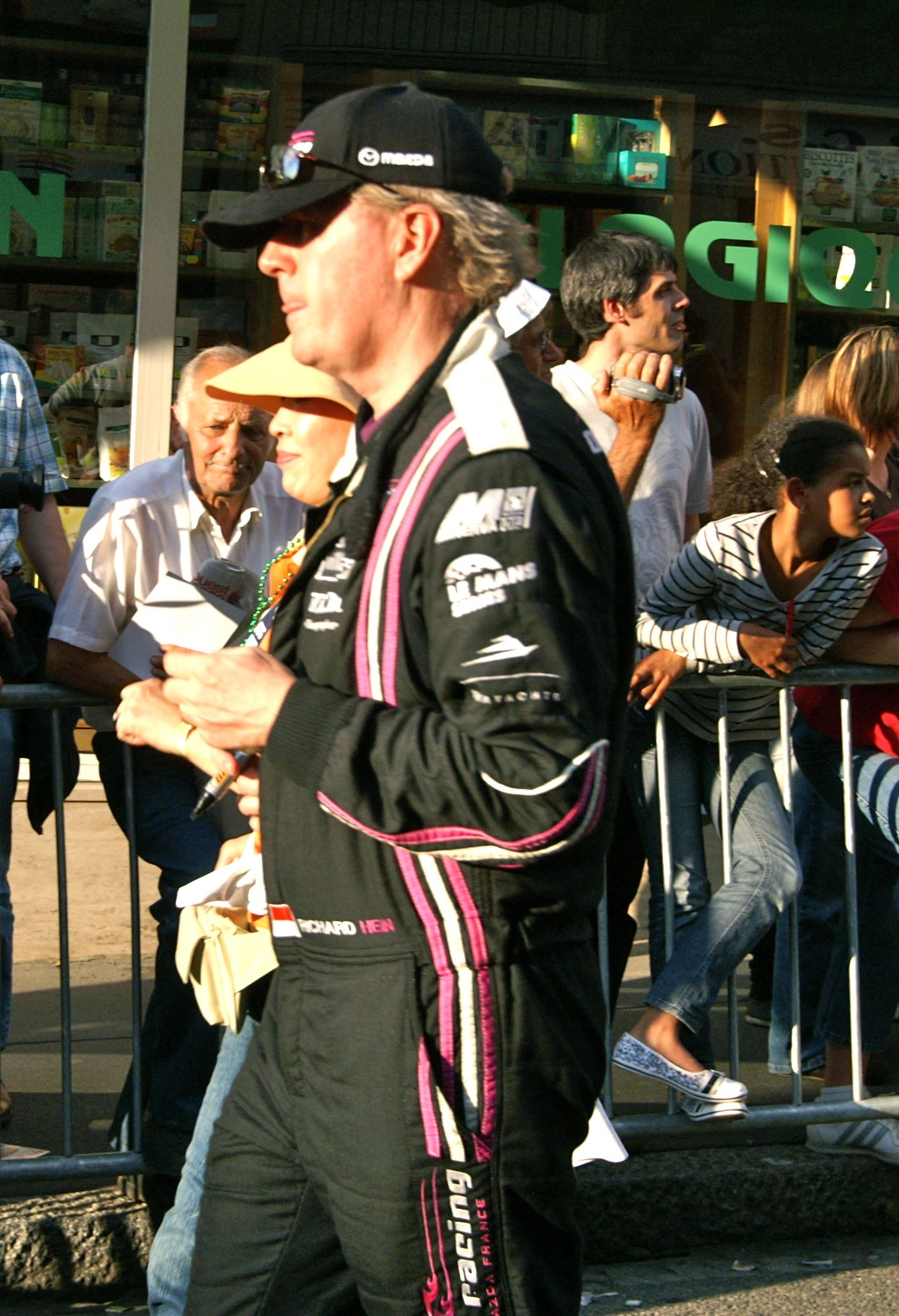
- Hein in 2010
- Nationality: (Monaco) Monégasque
- Born: 24 June 1958 (age 68) Monte Carlo, Monaco

Le Mans Series career
- Categorisation: FIA Silver (2007–2014); FIA Bronze (2015–2019)
- Teams: Saulnier Racing; OAK Racing
- Starts: 14
- Wins: 0
- Podiums: 4
- Poles: 0
- Fastest laps: 0
- Best finish: 4th in 2010

Championship titles
- 2009: Asian Le Mans Series - LMP2
24 Hours of Le Mans career
- Years: 2007 – 2011
- Teams: Saulnier Racing; OAK Racing
- Best finish: 9th (2010)
- Class wins: 0

Richard Hein (born 24 June 1958) is a Monégasque racing driver who competed in the LMP1 and LMP2 classes of the 24 Hours of Le Mans for OAK Racing.

Hein, along with co-drivers Jacques Nicolet and Matthieu Lahaye, won both races at the 2009 1000 km of Okayama, claiming the inaugural LMP2 title in the Asian Le Mans Series.

== Racing record ==
=== Racing career summary ===
Season	Series	Team	Races	Wins	Poles	F/Laps	Podiums	Points	Position
2007	V de V Challenge Endurance Moderne - Proto		7	0	0	0	0	10	60th
2008	Le Mans Series - LMP1	Saulnier Racing	5	0	0	0	0	1	21st
2008	24 Hours of Le Mans - LMP1	Saulnier Racing	1	0	0	0	0	N/A	12th
2009	Le Mans Series - LMP2	OAK Racing; Team Mazda France	4	0	0	0	1	13	7th
2009	24 Hours of Le Mans - LMP2	OAK Racing; Team Mazda France	1	0	0	0	1	N/A	**3rd**
2009	Asian Le Mans Series - LMP2	OAK Racing; Team Mazda France	2	2	2	2	2	21	**1st**
2009–10	Sportscar Winter Series - Proto	Boutsen Energy Racing	3	0	0	0	0	?	?
2010	Le Mans Series - LMP2	OAK Racing	5	0	0	0	3	52	4th
2010	24 Hours of Le Mans - LMP2	OAK Racing	1	0	0	0	0	N/A	4th
2011	Intercontinental Le Mans Cup - LMP1	OAK Racing	2	0	0	0	0	0	NC
2011	American Le Mans Series - LMP1	OAK Racing	1	0	0	0	0	0	NC
2011	24 Hours of Le Mans - LMP1	OAK Racing	1	0	0	0	0	N/A	10th
2012	Porsche Supercup	MRS GT-Racing	2	0	0	0	0	3	22nd

=== Complete Le Mans Series results ===
(key) (Races in bold indicate pole position; results in italics indicate fastest lap)

Year	Entrant	Class	Chassis	Engine	1	2	3	4	5	Pos.	Points
2008	Saulnier Racing	LMP1	Pescarolo 01	Judd GV5.5 S2 5.5 L V10	CAT; Ret	MNZ; Ret	SPA; 8	NÜR; 11	SIL; 9	21st	4
2009	OAK Racing Team Mazda France	LMP2	Pescarolo 01	Mazda MZR-R 2.0 L Turbo I4	CAT; 6	SPA; DNS	ALG; 8	NÜR; 4	SIL; 3	7th	13
2010	OAK Racing	LMP2	Pescarolo 01	Judd DB 3.4 L V8	LEC; 2	SPA; 3	ALG; Ret	HUN; 7	SIL; 3	4th	52

=== Complete 24 Hours of Le Mans results ===
Year	Team	Co-Drivers	Car	Class	Laps	Pos.	Class Pos.
2008	(France) Saulnier Racing	(Monaco) Marc Faggionato (France) Jacques Nicolet	Pescarolo 01-Judd	LMP1	311	26th	12th
2009	OAK Racing; Team Mazda France	(France) Jacques Nicolet (France) Jean-François Yvon	Pescarolo 01-Mazda	LMP2	325	20th	**3rd**
2010	(France) OAK Racing	(France) Jacques Nicolet (France) Jean-François Yvon	Pescarolo 01-Judd	LMP2	341	9th	4th
2011	(France) OAK Racing	(France) Jacques Nicolet (France) Jean-François Yvon	OAK Pescarolo 01 Evo-Judd	LMP1	119	DNF	DNF

=== Complete Asian Le Mans Series results ===
(key) (Races in bold indicate pole position) (Races in italics indicate fastest lap)

Year	Team	Class	Car	Engine	1	2	Pos.	Points
2009	OAK Racing Team Mazda France	LMP2	Pescarolo 01	Mazda MZR-R 2.0 L Turbo I4	**OKA**; **1**; 1	**OKA**; **2**; 1	1st	21

=== Complete American Le Mans Series results ===
(key) (Races in bold indicate pole position; results in italics indicate fastest lap)

Year	Team	Class	Make	Engine	1	2	3	4	5	6	7	8	9	Pos.	Points	Ref
2011	OAK Racing	LMP1	OAK Pescarolo 01	Judd DB 3.4 L V8	SEB; Ret	LBH	LRP	MOS	MDO	ELK	BAL	LGA	PET	NC	0	
