= 2013 24 Hours of Le Mans =

81st 24 Hours of Le Mans endurance race

Previous: 2012	Next: 2014
Index: Races | Winners

The track layout of the Circuit de la Sarthe

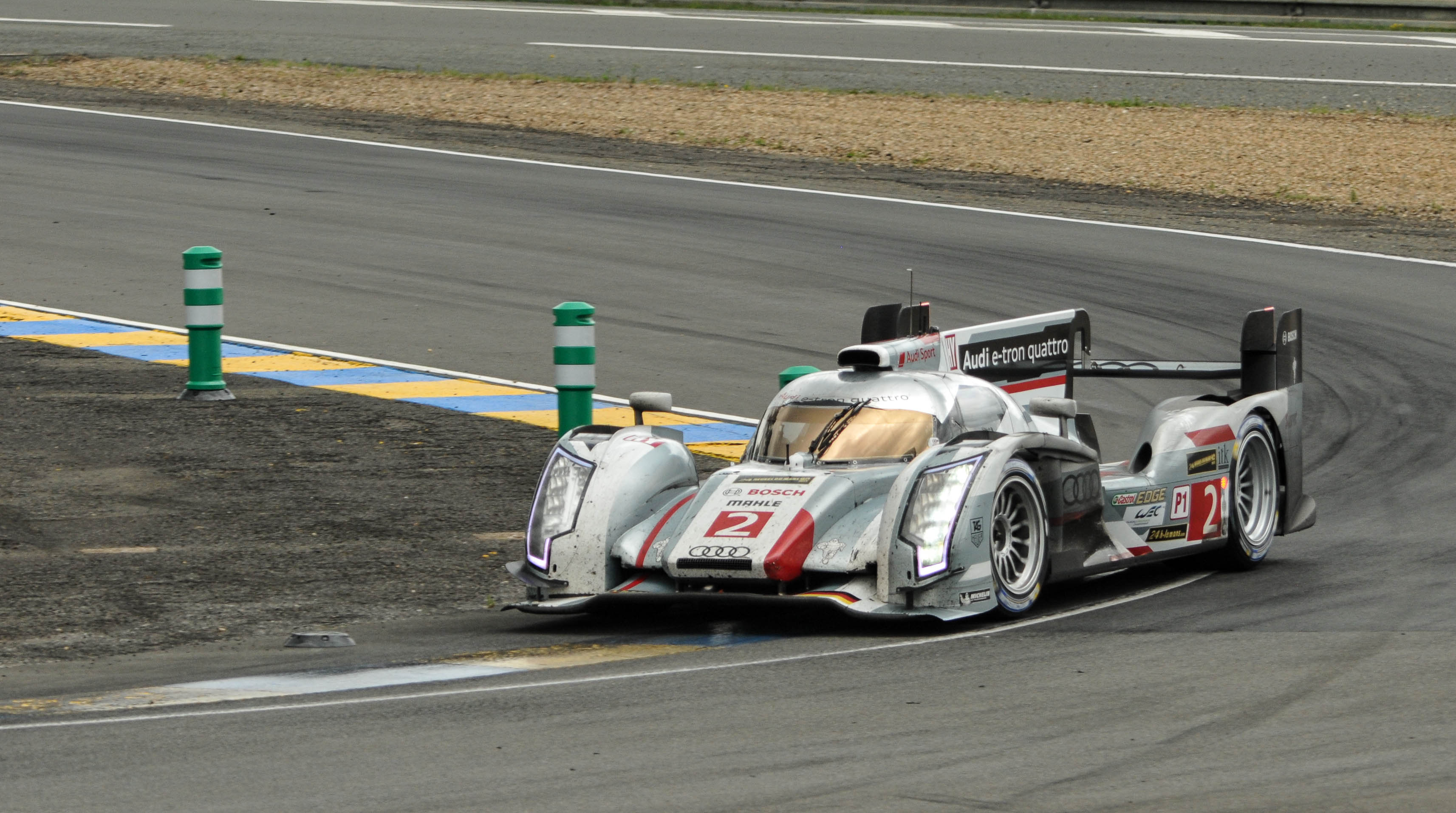
The race-winning No. 2 Audi R18 e-tron quattro

The 81st 24 Hours of Le Mans (French: 81^{e} 24 Heures du Mans) was a 24-hour automobile endurance racing event for teams of three drivers entering Le Mans Prototype and Le Mans Grand Touring Endurance cars held from 19 to 23 June 2013 at the Circuit de la Sarthe close to Le Mans, France. It was the 81st running of the event, as organised by the Automobile Club de l'Ouest (ACO) since 1923. The race was the third and the premier round of the 2013 FIA World Endurance Championship, with 32 of the race's 56 entries contesting the championship. A test day was held two weeks prior to the race on 9 June. Approximately 245,000 spectators attended the event.

The race was won by an Audi R18 e-tron quattro shared by Dane Tom Kristensen, Brit Allan McNish and Frenchman Loïc Duval after it led the last 248 laps, taking the manufacturers' twelfth victory at Le Mans since its first in the 2000 edition. It was Kristensen's ninth victory, McNish's third and Duval's first. The car started from pole position but lost the lead at the start to the sister No. 1 Audi of André Lotterer, Marcel Fässler and Benoît Tréluyer who traded the position with a Toyota TS030 Hybrid shared by Anthony Davidson, Stéphane Sarrazin and Sébastien Buemi under pit stop rotation until it was forced into the pit lane in the seventh hour with a crankshaft position sensor fault. Buemi, Davidson and Sarrazin finished second and Lucas di Grassi, Marc Gené and Oliver Jarvis in another Audi completed the race podium.

The Le Mans Prototype 2 (LMP2) category finished with the OAK Racing Morgan car of Bertrand Baguette, Martin Plowman and Ricardo González ahead of the sister entry of Alex Brundle, David Heinemeier Hansson and Olivier Pla by a distance of one lap. The class podium was completed by Greaves Motorsport's Zytek Z11SN, driven by Michael Krumm, Jann Mardenborough and Lucas Ordóñez. One of Porsche's Manthey Racing 991 RSR of Romain Dumas, Marc Lieb and Richard Lietz won the Le Mans Grand Touring Professional (LMGTE Pro) class and the sister No. 91 vehicle of Jörg Bergmeister, Timo Bernhard and Patrick Pilet in second. Porsche also won the Le Mans Grand Touring Amateur (LMGTE Am) category with the No. 76 IMSA Performance Matmut car of Raymond Narac, Christophe Bourret and Jean-Karl Vernay, earning the marque its 100th class victory at Le Mans.

The result elevated Kristensen, McNish and Duval to the top of the Drivers' Championship with 94 points. The championship leaders going into the race, Lotterer, Fässler and Tréluyer fell to second while Davidson, Sarrazin and Buemi maintained third due to the trio's second-place finish. Di Grassi, Gené and Jarvis moved from sixth to fourth and the duo of Alexander Wurz and Nicolas Lapierre rounded out the top five. With 102 points, Audi increased their lead over Toyota in the Manufacturers' Championship to 35 points with five rounds left in the season.

== Background ==
The 2013 24 Hours of Le Mans was moved forward one week after a request was filed by the world governing body of motorsport, the Fédération Internationale de l'Automobile (FIA), in order to harmonise the 2013 motor racing calendar. It was the 81st annual edition of the event, as well as the third of eight automobile endurance races in the 2013 FIA World Endurance Championship. Going into the race, Audi Sport Team Joest drivers André Lotterer, Marcel Fässler and Benoît Tréluyer led the Drivers' Championship with 44 points, one ahead of their teammates Allan McNish, Tom Kristensen and Loïc Duval in second. Anthony Davidson, Stéphane Sarrazin and Sébastien Buemi of Toyota were third with 27 points. Rebellion Racing's Neel Jani, Nico Prost and Nick Heidfeld were fourth with 20 points, and their teammates Andrea Belicchi, Mathias Beche and Cheng Congfu were fifth with 16 points. In the Manufacturers' Championship, Audi (with 51 points) led their rivals Toyota by 20 points.

== Balance of Performance changes ==
The FIA Endurance Committee altered the balance of performance in three of the four categories to try and create parity in the classes. All hybrid and non-hybrid petrol powered LMP1 (Le Mans Prototype 1) cars received an additional 3 L (0.66 imp gal; 0.79 US gal) of fuel capacity for improved fuel mileage, allowing the Toyota TS030 Hybrid to run with a 76 L (17 imp gal; 20 US gal) fuel tank and the Rebellion Racing Lola B12/60s and the Strakka Racing HPD ARX-03c had 80 L (18 imp gal; 21 US gal) fuel tanks. Porsche received an increase in performance by allowing a 0.3 mm (0.012 in) larger air restrictor on the air intake of their engines in the Le Mans Grand Touring Endurance Professional (LMGTE Pro) and Le Mans Grand Touring Endurance Amateur (LMGTE Am) classes. Aston Martin had 10 kg (22 lb) of ballast added to its LMGTE Pro Vantage while the Chevrolet Corvette C6.R received a 25 kg (55 lb) reduction in weight. The Ferrari 458 Italia GT2 and the SRT Viper GTS-R had no performance changes.

== Entries ==
The automotive group Automobile Club de l'Ouest (ACO) granted 56 invitations to the 24 Hours of Le Mans. Entries were divided between the LMP1, LMP2 (Le Mans Prototype 2), LMGTE Pro and LMGTE Am categories. By the deadline for entries on 16 January, 71 applications had been filed with the ACO.

=== Automatic entries ===
Automatic entries were earned by teams which won their class in the previous running of the 24 Hours of Le Mans, or had won Le Mans-based series and events such as the American Le Mans Series (ALMS), European Le Mans Series (ELMS), and the Petit Le Mans. Some second-place finishers were also granted automatic entries in certain series. Entries were also granted for the winners of the Michelin Energy Endurance Challenge in the FIA World Endurance Championship (WEC). A final entry was granted to the champion in the ELMS' Formula Le Mans category, with the winner receiving their invitation in LMP2. For the first time, champions in the ALMS or at the Petit Le Mans did not automatically receive an entry. Instead, the ALMS was given three "at-large" entries, which the series awarded to teams who were interested in participating at Le Mans. As automatic entries were granted to teams, the teams could change their cars from the previous year to the next, but were not allowed to change their category. However, automatic invitations in the two GTE categories could be swapped between the two based on the driver line-ups chosen by these teams.

On 14 November 2012, the list of automatic entries was announced by the ACO. JMB Racing and Conquest Racing were the two teams who chose not to accept their automatic invitations as they did not run in any series during the 2013 season.

Automatic entries for the 2013 24 Hours of Le Mans
Reason Entered	LMP1	LMP2	LMGTE Pro	LMGTE Am
1st in the 24 Hours of Le Mans	(Germany) Audi Sport Team Joest	(United States) Starworks Motorsport	(Italy) AF Corse	(France) Larbre Compétition
1st in the European Le Mans Series		(France) Thiriet by TDS Racing	(United Kingdom) JMW Motorsport	(France) IMSA Performance Matmut
2nd in the European Le Mans Series		(France) OAK Racing	(Monaco) JMB Racing	(Italy) AF Corse
American Le Mans Series at-large entries		(United States) Level 5 Motorsports (United States) Conquest Racing	(United States) Extreme Speed Motorsports	
1st in FIA WEC Michelin Green X Challenge	(Germany) Audi Sport Team Joest		(Italy) AF Corse	
1st in European Le Mans Series FLM category		(Belgium) Boutsen Ginion Racing		

=== Entry list ===
In conjunction with the announcement of entries for the WEC and the ELMS, the ACO announced the full 56 car entry list and ten vehicle reserve list during a press conference at the Eurosites George V in Paris on 1 February. In addition to the 32 guaranteed entries from the WEC, ten entries came from the ELMS and eight from the ALMS, while the rest of the field was filled with one-off entries competing only at Le Mans.

=== Garage 56 ===
The ACO continued the Garage 56 concept that was started in the 2012 race. Garage 56 allows a 56th entry to the race, using the rigors of the 24 Hours of Le Mans to test new technology. The ACO announced during 2012 that the Swiss-developed GreenGT vehicle had been granted the Garage 56 entry for the 2013 edition. The GreenGT LMP-H2 utilizes a hydrogen fuel cell to run electric motors within an open-top Le Mans Prototype style body. Three weeks before the race, GreenGT withdrew their entry, citing a lack of time to complete the complex fine-tuning of the hydrogen fuel cell system. No reserve was available for the 56th garage.

=== Reserves ===
Ten reserves were initially nominated by the ACO, limited to the LMP2 and both of the LMGTE categories. Extreme Speed Motorsports withdrew their Ferrari 458 Italia GT2 on 1 March, following a late switch to the ALMS' P2 category. This promoted the No. 98 Aston Martin Racing Vantage to the race entry as a result and the car was moved from LMGTE Am to the LMGTE Pro class to bring the number of Aston Martins in the event to five. Two weeks later, Sébastien Loeb Racing withdrew its Oreca 03-Nissan because of financial troubles, promoting the No. 34 Race Performance Oreca-Judd entry from the reserves. Starworks Motorsport, defending champions of Le Mans and the FIA WEC in the LMP2 category, withdrew their HPD-Honda entry on 9 April due to a lack of funding from sponsors, promoting Morand Racing's Morgan-Judd.

Ten days later, Gulf Racing Middle East withdrew the second of its Lola-Nissan B12/80s and DKR Engineering's Lola-Judd replaced the entry. On 21 May, the ACO released a revised entry list that confirmed the withdrawal of Extreme Speed Motorsport's Ferrari 458 Italia, Sébastien Loeb Racing's Oreca 03-Nissan, Starworks Motorsports' HPD-Honda and Gulf Racing Middle East's Lola-Nissan B12/80 from the 24 Hours of Le Mans. On 1 June, GreenGT Technologies announced the withdrawal of the Garage 56 entry, with Prospeed Competition's LMGTE Am Porsche 911 GT3 RSR being announced as its replacement. By the start of the event, only a single reserve entry had not been promoted to the race.

== Testing and practice ==
A test day was held on 9 June, two weeks prior to the race, and required all entrants for the race to participate in eight hours of track time divided into two sessions. All 56 entries were involved as well as a fourth Audi R18 e-tron quattro driven by Marco Bonanomi for 2014 tyre testing, a Signatech Alpine A450 for Paul-Loup Chatin and Tristan Gommendy and a spare Level 5 Motorsports HPD ARX-03b tested by Scott Tucker. Two Team Endurance Challenge-entered Le Mans Prototype Challenge Oreca-FLM09s also participated. Wet weather swept the area during the day and had Audi set the fastest time with a 3:22.583 lap from Duval in the No. 2 car at the end of the second session. Lucas di Grassi in the sister No. 3 entry followed in second and Lotterer completed an all-Audi top three lockout in third. Toyota placed fourth and sixth with its best times coming from Sarrazin and Alexander Wurz; they were separated by Bonanomi's Audi. During the first session, Duval was distracted by an unidentified object hitting his windscreen and heavily damaged the No. 2 car in the wall alongside the track at Tertre Rouge corner leading onto the Mulsanne Straight. Olivier Pla's OAK Racing Morgan-Nissan was the fastest LMP2 car with a late second session effort of 3:38.801 and he was eight-tenths of a second faster than Nelson Panciatici's Signatech Alpine. LMGTE Pro was topped by Peter Dumbreck for Aston Martin Racing while Jamie Campbell-Walter also helped the marque lead in LMGTE Am. Crashes from Tracy Krohn of Krohn Racing at the right of Mulsanne corner, AF Corse's Giancarlo Fisichella leaving the same turn and Dominik Kraihamer for Lotus in the Porsche Curves led to stoppages during both sessions.

Two days after the test day, Audi and Signatech Alpine held two half an hour practice sessions in the morning and the afternoon on the shorter and permanent Bugatti Circuit in wet weather conditions to ensure that car components worked efficiently before the race. Official practice was held on 19 June with the full 56-car field on track for four hours. A torrential rain shower fell at Le Mans in the early afternoon but it tapered off before practice commenced and the track dried up during the session although light rain returned midway through and some cars spun. Audi again led from the start with Tréluyer's No. 1 car setting a benchmark time until Duval went quickest with a 3:25.514 lap. Marino Franchitti's No. 33 Level 5 Motorsports car was the early LMP2 pace setter until Alex Brundle's No. 24 OAK Racing Morgan moved to first but it was Bertrand Baguette's sister No. 35 entry who was fastest with a lap of 3:42.813. He was a second faster than Maxime Martin's No. 46 Thiriet by TDS Racing Oreca. An hour into the session, Eric Lux crashed the No. 41 Greaves Motorsport car heavily into a barrier entering the second Mulsanne chicane and the session was stopped due to debris on the track. Lux was unhurt. The LMGTE Pro class lead constantly changed amongst the field with Richard Lietz's No. 91 Porsche 911 RSR fastest with Kamui Kobayashi's No. 71 AF Corse Ferrari two-tenths of a second slower in second. Kristian Poulsen's No. 95 Aston Martin was quickest in the LMGTE Am category. Krohn had a high speed accident at the downhill Dunlop Esses and his car was launched about 20 ft (6.1 m) into the air before landing in a gravel trap, bringing an early end to practice due to a large amount of damage to the barriers.

== Qualifying ==
The first dry session of the week occurred on Wednesday night in the first of three qualifying sessions to set the race's starting order with the fastest lap times set by each team's quickest driver. Audi again led from the outset with Duval's early lap of 3:23.169 which he then improved to 3:22.349. (Note: Loïc Duval's time was one and a half-second faster than the 2012 pole position lap.) The lap was not bettered for the remainder of the session, giving the No. 2 car provisional pole position. Marc Gené's sister No. 3 car followed in second and Lotterer's No. 1 vehicle was third. The two Toyotas replicated their test day results of fourth and sixth with drivers Kazuki Nakajima and Buemi although the former was second early in qualifying and a driveline problem curtailed the No. 8 Toyota's session at Arnage corner; they were separated by the leading LMP1 privateer, the No. 12 Rebellion. John Martin's No. 26 G-Drive Oreca set the only lap under 3-minute, 40 seconds in LMP2 with the best class lap of 3:39.535, ahead of Franck Mailleux's No. 43 Morand Racing Morgan-Nissan and Brundle's No. 24 OAK Racing car. Pierre Thiriet had a heavy accident at the second Mulsanne chicane, denting the barriers alongside the track, and ending the session 15 minutes early because repairs could not be completed in time. The professional category of LMGTE was dominated by Aston Martin who took three of the first four places with the best time coming from Frédéric Makowiecki's No. 99 car as less than a second separated the top seven. Allan Simonsen helped Aston Martin to be fastest in LMGTE Am and he narrowly eclipsed Paolo Ruberti's No. 88 Proton Porsche.

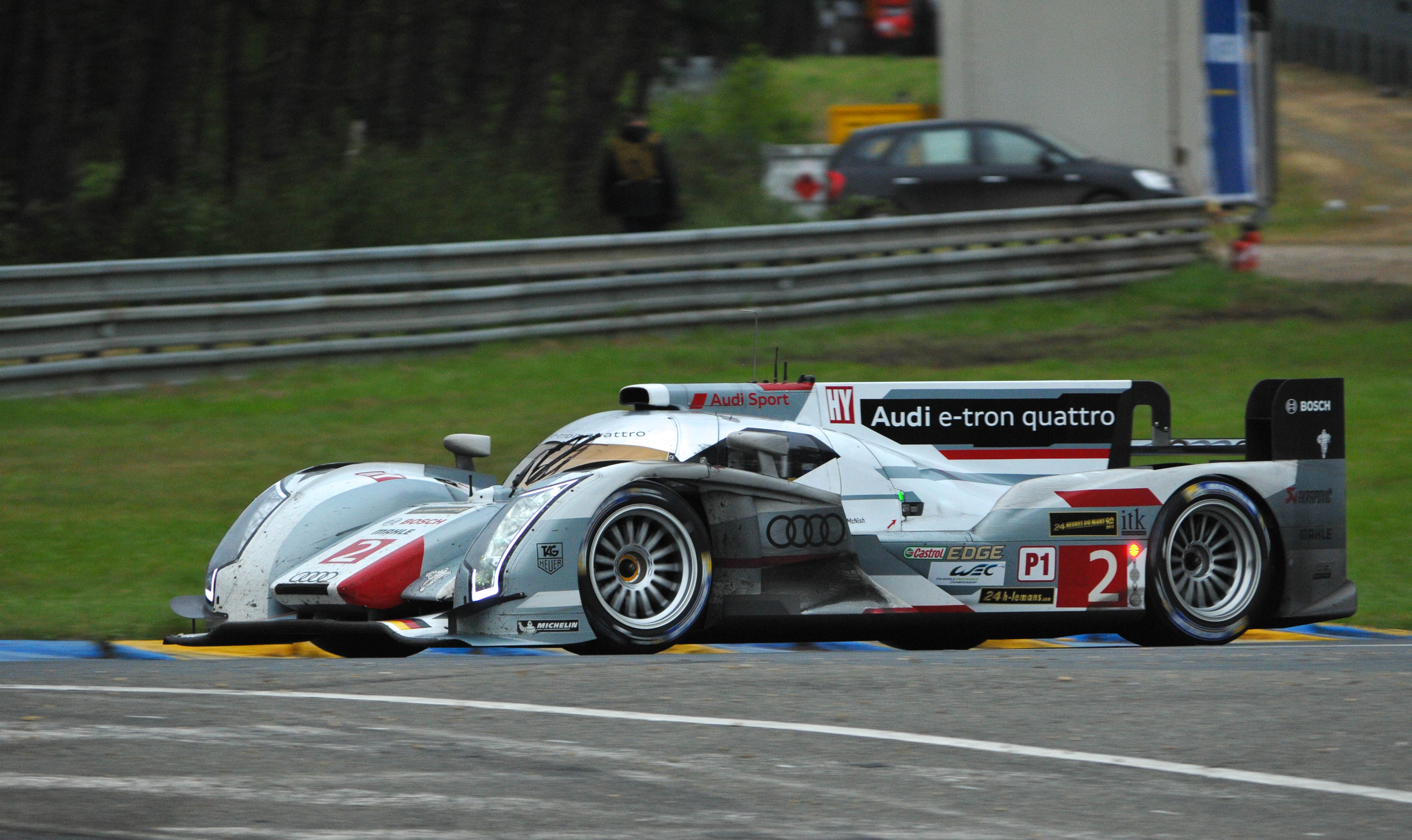
The No. 2 Audi R18 e-tron quattro earned pole position in the hands of Loïc Duval during the first qualifying session.

Thursday's first qualifying session was affected by a waterlogged track after a short torrential downpour fell minutes before it commenced. Track conditions improved progressively as it dried but all lap times were slower than on Wednesday evening. The best overall lap time of the session came from Davidson in the No. 7 Toyota with a time of 3:42.507 and the fastest Audi was the No. 3 entry of di Grassi in second. The second Audi driven by Fässler was third-fastest and the quickest privateer team was the No. 12 Rebellion in fourth. Davidson's No. 8 Toyota rounded out the top five. In LMP2, John Martin kept the No. 26 G-Drive car leading the category while Tom Kimber-Smith drove the No. 41 Greaves Motorsport Zytek-Nissan on its first laps since it was repaired and was second-fastest in its class during the session and was provisionally 19th overall. The sister No. 42 Greaves car was third in the hands of Jann Mardenborough. The No. 40 Boutsen Ginion Oreca-Nissan of Matt Downs crashed heavily into the inside barrier entering Indianapolis corner with its front. Downs was unhurt but qualifying ended early because repairs to the wall ran until after the session. The LMGTE Pro class was led by Jan Magnussen's No. 73 Chevrolet Corvette C6.R while the LMGTE Am category was topped by the No. 96 Aston Martin of Stuart Hall with his teammate Poulsen in second.

With the stoppage in the second qualifying session, the third session was expanded by half an hour to give teams more time on the circuit. The track continued to be wet but it dried sufficiently enough to allow for an improvement to lap times with 20 minutes left as on-track grip continued to improve. Two stoppages curtailed running in the session: the first was triggered for ten minutes when Christophe Bourret removed the left-front wheel off the No. 77 IMSA Performance Matmut car in an impact with the wall at the first Mulsanne chicane. Jonny Kane in the No. 21 Strakka Racing HPD ARX-03c caused the second red flag after he heavily clouted a barrier and littered debris at the second Mulsanne chicane. Lotterer and his teammate di Grassi could not usurp Duval's time from Wednesday evening because they were caught out by damp patches on the circuit and the No. 2 started from pole position in the first Audi top three lockout on the Le Mans grid since the 2002 edition. Toyota could not challenge Audi but Sarrazin improved the No. 8 car's best lap in the final seconds of qualifying to start fourth and Nakajima's sister No. 7 vehicle qualified fifth. The No. 12 Rebellion Lola of Jani was the highest-placed privateer in sixth overall.

LMP2 continued to be led by G-Drive because of John Martin's lap from first qualifying until Pla's No. 24 OAK Racing Morgan pushed hard in clear air to clinch the pole position in the category with a time of 3:38.621 recorded at the end of the session. The car was a second faster than the No. 26 G-Drive Oreca which began from the second position. Oliver Turvey found improved pace in the No. 38 Jota Sport Zytek Nissan and bettered the car's best time to start third and the top three in LMP2 were represented by three manufacturers. Stefan Mücke got the No. 97 Aston Martin to provisional pole position in LMGTE Pro but his teammate Makowiecki in the sister No. 99 car responded immediately to retake the position with a lap of 3:54.635. The No. 91 Porsche of Marc Lieb bettered the car's fastest lap time on the final lap of the third qualifying session to take third place on the starting grid. The lead in LMGTE Am remained with the No. 95 Aston Martin as Simonsen improved his own provisional pole lap to a 3:57.776 to go more than a second faster than Proton Competition's Porsche.

=== Qualifying results ===
Pole positions in each class are denoted in bold. The fastest time set by each entry is denoted in gray.

Final qualifying classification
Pos.	Class	No.	Team	Qualifying 1	Qualifying 2	Qualifying 3	Gap	Grid
1	**LMP1**	**2**	**Audi Sport Team Joest**	**3:22.349**	no time	3:27.513		1
2	LMP1	1	Audi Sport Team Joest	3:25.474	3:41.951	**3:23.696**	+1.347	2
3	LMP1	3	Audi Sport Team Joest	3:24.341	3:40.990	3:24.776	+1.992	3
4	LMP1	8	Toyota Racing	3:30.841	3:42.507	3:26.654	+4.305	4
5	LMP1	7	Toyota Racing	3:26.676	**3:40.924**	3:28.859	+4.327	5
6	LMP1	12	Rebellion Racing	3:30.423	3:42.261	3:28.935	+6.586	6
7	LMP1	13	Rebellion Racing	3:32.167	4:07.039	3:37.296	+9.818	7
8	LMP1	21	Strakka Racing	3:36.547	no time	3:45.173	+14.198	36^{1}
9	**LMP2**	**24**	**OAK Racing**	3:40.780	no time	**3:38.621**	+16.272	8
10	LMP2	26	G-Drive Racing	**3:39.535**	**3:53.998**	3:45.468	+17.186	9
11	LMP2	38	Jota Sport	3:44.835	no time	3:40.459	+18.110	10
12	LMP2	43	Morand Racing	3:40.741	no time	3:43.839	+18.392	11
13	LMP2	25	Delta-ADR	3:40.925	4:12.200	3:45.147	+18.576	12
14	LMP2	47	KCMG	3:45.500	no time	3:41.042	+18.693	13
15	LMP2	48	Murphy Prototypes	3:44.538	no time	3:41.569	+19.220	14
16	LMP2	36	Signatech Alpine	3:43.835	4:06.213	3:41.654	+19.305	15
17	LMP2	35	OAK Racing	3:42.387	no time	3:41.854	+19.505	16
18	LMP2	49	PeCom Racing	3:43.420	4:00.127	3:44.637	+21.071	17
19	LMP2	46	Thiriet by TDS Racing	3:43.494	no time	no time	+21.145	37^{1}
20	LMP2	42	Greaves Motorsport	3:49.421	3:58.807	3:44.421	+22.072	18
21	LMP2	41	Greaves Motorsport	no time	3:56.487	3:44.621	+22.272	19
22	LMP2	34	Race Performance	3:45.244	no time	3:51.498	+22.895	20
23	LMP2	32	Lotus	no time	4:12.327	3:45.274	+22.925	21
24	LMP2	31	Lotus	3:47.920	no time	3:49.548	+25.571	38^{1}
25	LMP2	45	OAK Racing	3:48.196	no time	3:59.988	+25.847	22
26	LMP2	33	Level 5 Motorsports	3:48.597	4:03.528	3:53.861	+26.248	23
27	LMP2	28	Gulf Racing Middle East	3:49.096	no time	4:08.116	+26.747	39^{1}
28	LMP2	30	HVM Status GP	3:49.805	4:14.473	3:54.358	+27.456	24
29	**LMGTE Pro**	**99**	**Aston Martin Racing**	**3:55.658**	4:17.862	**3:54.635**	+32.286	25
30	LMGTE Pro	97	Aston Martin Racing	3:56.004	4:25.834	3:55.445	+33.096	26
31	LMGTE Pro	92	Porsche AG Team Manthey	3:56.457	4:29.096	3:55.491	+33.142	27
32	LMGTE Pro	51	AF Corse	3:55.909	4:20.620	4:00.196	+33.560	28
33	LMGTE Pro	98	Aston Martin Racing	3:56.336	no time	4:01.283	+33.987	40^{1}
34	LMGTE Pro	71	AF Corse	3:56.471	4:25.740	3:58.078	+34.122	29
35	LMGTE Pro	91	Porsche AG Team Manthey	3:56.573	4:17.996	3:58.433	+34.224	30
36	LMP2	39	DKR Engineering	3:56.905	no time	4:03.613	+34.556	41^{1}
37	LMP2	40	Boutsen Ginion Racing	3:57.139	4:11.137	4:10.631	+34.790	42^{1}
38	**LMGTE Am**	**95**	**Aston Martin Racing**	**3:58.661**	4:19.486	**3:57.776**	+35.427	31
39	LMGTE Pro	74	Corvette Racing	3:59.860	4:21.574	3:58.644	+36.295	32
40	LMGTE Am	88	Proton Competition	3:59.246	no time	3:58.889	+36.540	43^{1}
41	LMGTE Pro	73	Corvette Racing	3:59.526	**4:11.034**	4:02.189	+37.177	33
42	LMGTE Am	96	Aston Martin Racing	4:01.035	**4:18.829**	3:59.805	+37.456	44^{1}
43	LMGTE Am	61	AF Corse	4:02.815	4:24.897	3:59.997	+37.648	45^{1}
44	LMGTE Am	67	IMSA Performance Matmut	4:00.503	no time	4:50.043	+38.154	46^{1}
45	LMGTE Am	75	Prospeed Competition	4:11.719	no time	4:00.682	+38.333	47^{1}
46	LMGTE Pro	53	SRT Motorsports	4:03.127	no time	4:00.802	+38.453	34
47	LMGTE Am	77	Dempsey Del Piero-Proton	4:03.378	no time	4:00.916	+38.567	48^{1}
48	LMGTE Am	76	IMSA Performance Matmut	4:01.713	no time	4:15.101	+39.364	49^{1}
49	LMGTE Am	81	8 Star Motorsports	4:07.625	4:24.002	4:01.934	+39.585	50^{1}
50	LMGTE Pro	93	SRT Motorsports	4:03.461	no time	4:04.477	+41.112	35
51	LMGTE Am	55	AF Corse	4:03.966	4:22.194	4:05.924	+41.617	51^{1}
52	LMGTE Am	70	Larbre Compétition	4:04.512	4:38.739	4:29.068	+42.163	52^{1}
53	LMGTE Am	50	Larbre Compétition	4:04.873	4:31.216	4:09.723	+42.524	53^{1}
54	LMGTE Pro	66	JMW Motorsport	no time	no time	4:05.417	+43.068	54^{1}
55	LMGTE Am	54	AF Corse	4:09.064	no time	4:41.506	+46.715	55^{1}
56	LMGTE Am	57	Krohn Racing	no time	no time	4:16.233	+53.884	56^{1}
Pos.	Class	No.	Team	Qualifying 1	Qualifying 2	Qualifying 3	Gap	Grid

Notes:

- **^1** – The noted cars were moved to the back of the starting grid due to not having all three of their drivers setting qualifying lap times within 110 per cent of the class leader's pole time.

== Warm-up ==
The cars took to the circuit on Saturday morning for a 45-minute warm-up session in dry and clear weather. The No. 7 Toyota of Nicolas Lapierre set the team's fastest lap time of the weekend so far at 3:26.227. McNish's No. 2 Audi was 0.504 seconds adrift in second and third was occupied by his teammate Fässler in the sister No. 1 car. The fastest LMP2 lap was set by John Martin's No. 26 G-Drive Oreca with a time of 3:43.158, almost nine-tenths of a second faster than Brendon Hartley in the No. 48 Murphy Prototypes vehicle and Archie Hamilton's No. 25 Delta-ADR car was third. Porsche and AF Corse exchanged first in LMGTE Pro before Toni Vilander's No. 71 Ferrari set the best time in the category, while Patrick Long, driving the No. 77 Dempsey Proton Porsche, was fastest in LMGTE Am and second quickest amongst all LMGTE cars. Several drivers went off the track during the session. Kristensen hit the No. 67 IMSA Performance Matmut car of Pascal Gibon at Indianapolis turn and yellow flags were waved in the area because Kristensen was stranded in the grass to the left of the circuit. Philippe Dumas crashed the No. 70 Larbre Compétition Corvette into a tyre barrier at the Dunlop chicane halfway through the session and the No. 25 G-Drive car of Tor Graves blew its right-rear tyre on the run to the Porsche Curves and veered heavily into the inside barriers and debris was littered on the track. Graves was unhurt.

== Race ==
=== Start ===
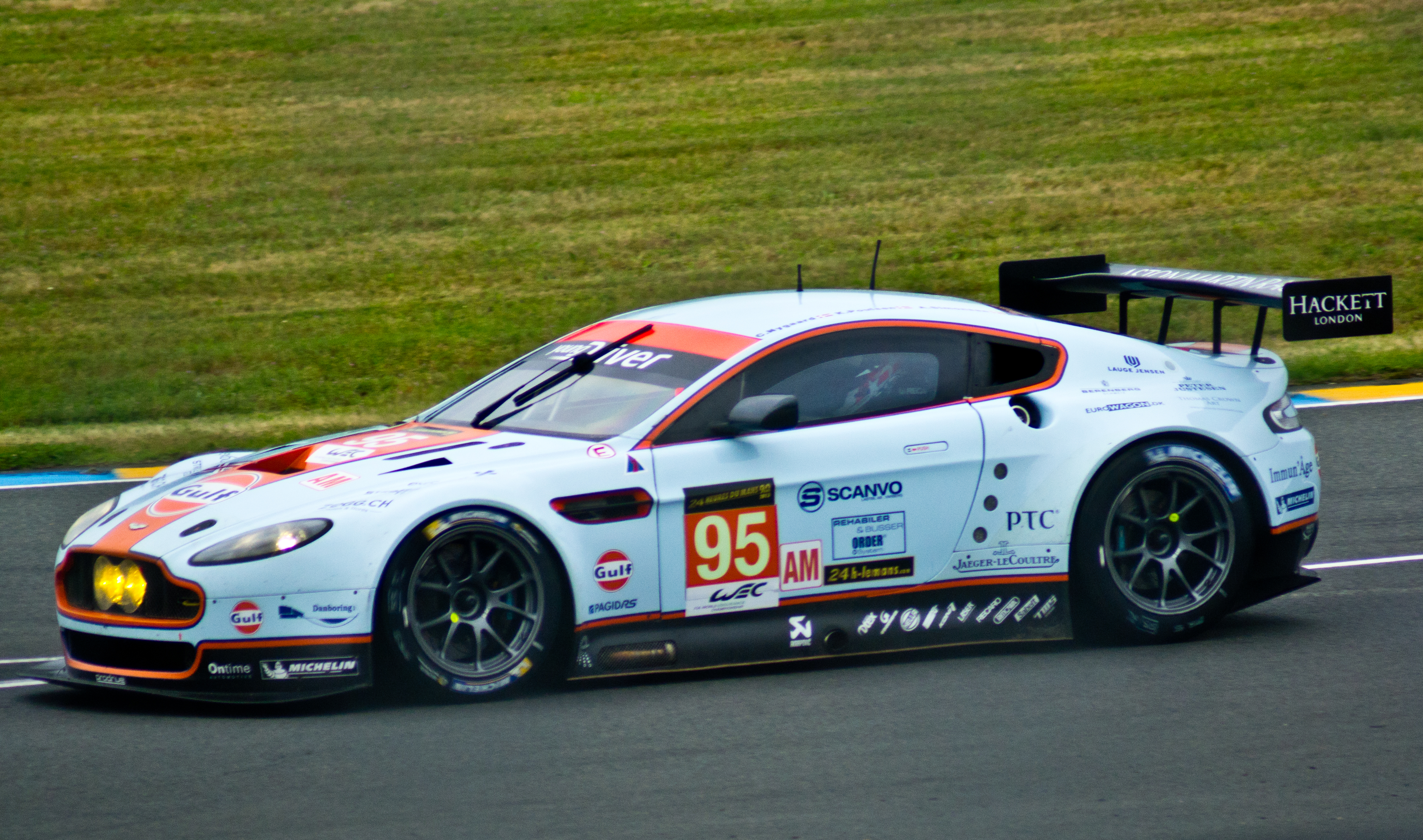
Allan Simonsen died from injuries he sustained during the ninth minute of the 24 Hours of Le Mans.

Approximately 245,000 spectators attended the event on race day. The weather at the start was damp and overcast. The air temperature throughout ranged from 12.8 to 18.3 °C (55.0 to 64.9 °F) and the track temperature was between 15.5 to 21.8 °C (59.9 to 71.2 °F). The race began at 15:00 Central European Summer Time (UTC+02:00), with Grand-Am Road Racing founder and NASCAR vice-chairman Jim France waving the French tricolour to signal the start the race. Lotterer moved past McNish for the lead and then Lapierre overtook McNish for second place at the second Mulsanne chicane but he lost the position at the exit of the corner. Lapierre then reclaimed second from McNish on the approach to Mulsanne turn. Davidson overtook di Grassi for second through the Ford chicane as Darren Turner's No. 97 Aston Martin took the lead of LMGTE Pro from his Aston Martin teammate Bell in the No. 99 car. Lapierre was closing on Lotterer when the safety cars were deployed for an accident at Tetre Rouge corner. Early on, LMGTE Am leader Allan Simonsen had pulled clear of the class field when, nine minutes into the race, the rear-left corner of his car lost traction on a kerb leaving Tetre Rouge corner. When he attempted to correct, his car veered left and he collided heavily with a left-hand armco barrier at a near head-on trajectory. The impact crushed the roof of the car and its supporting roll cage; its force launched it slowly back onto the circuit with a wheel and its doors detached.

Medical personnel were swift to tend to Simonsen, who was reported to be conscious and talking to officials before going into unconsciousness. He was extricated from the car and transported to the infield medical centre after about 20 minutes. Simonsen was shortly after declared dead from his injuries at the infield medical centre. (Note: Allan Simonsen was the first driver to die at the 24 Hours of Le Mans since Sébastien Enjolras during pre-qualifying for the 1997 race and the first during the race itself since Jo Gartner in the 1986 edition.) His partner Catrina requested that Aston Martin Racing continue racing. Simonsen was the first driver to die at Le Mans since Sébastien Enjolras during pre-qualifying in 1997. The safety cars remained on track for 58 minutes in which the LMGTE Pro order was divided into two-halves. When racing resumed, Davidson and the Audi duo of McNish of di Grassi overtook Lapierre to demote him to fifth. Davidson took the overall lead for the first time on pit stop cycle rotation due to Toyota's better fuel economy over the Audis and kept it until the end of lap fifteen. Lieb moved to the front of LMGTE Pro by passing the Aston Martins of Rob Bell and Turner but the No. 91 Porsche lost the first position to Turner halfway through the second hour. At the start of the third hour, Lotterer was demoted to second when Lapierre moved past him on the exit to Mulsanne corner but he was not recorded as the leader because he entered the pit lane at the end of lap twenty-seven. Rain returned to the track at this time as Turvey and Maxime Martin moved in front of Pierre Kaffer's No. 49 PeCom Racing Oreca for second and third in LMP2.

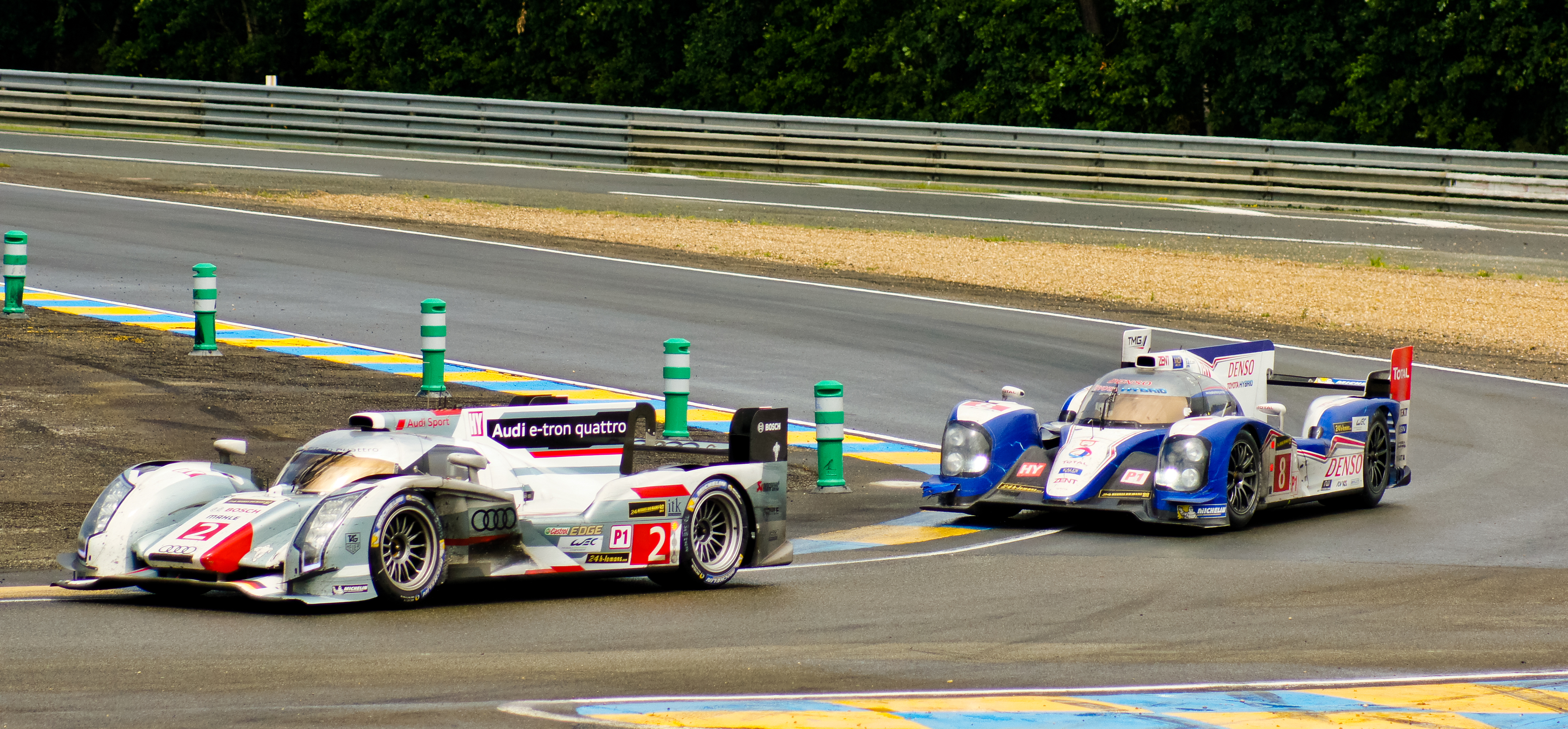
The No. 2 Audi R18 e-tron quattro followed closely by the No. 8 Toyota TS030 Hybrid at Mulsanne corner

Lapierre stopped at the side of the Mulsanne Straight with a fuel pressure fault for half a minute before resuming in fifth when the reset button was pressed. At the close of hour three, Gibon's No. 67 IMSA Performance Matmut car blew its left-rear tyre and lost the lead of LMGTE Am. The rain later eased and Audi re-established its advantage in the top three overall while Brundle extended the No. 24 OAK Racing car's gap in LMP2 over Mike Conway after he went into the gravel trap at Mulsanne corner while lapping Hall's No. 99 Aston Martin and Matt Griffin assumed the lead in LMGTE Am. The main on-track action involved Lucas Luhr who ran wide in the Porsche Curves and glanced an inside barrier alongside the track but he continued without significant damage to the No. 38 Jota Sport Zytek. Makowiecki moved past his Aston Martin teammate Mücke for the LMGTE Pro lead and Oliver Jarvis was delayed by the No. 39 DKR Engineering Lola through the Porsche Curves and lost third to Buemi. He retook the position from Buemi on the next lap. Later, Bill Auberlen relieved Mücke in the No. 97 Aston Martin and he was overtaken by Patrick Pilet's No. 92 Porsche for second in LMGTE Pro. Seven minutes into the sixth hour, the left-rear tyre of Gommendy's No. 36 Signatech Alpine blew and disintegrated entering the Mulsanne Straight as he hit the barrier at Tetre Rouge turn. The safety cars were dispatched for 15 minutes for debris removal.

=== Night ===
As the safety cars were recalled, David Heinemeier Hansson in the No. 24 OAK Racing Nissan collided with Duval's leading No. 2 Audi in the Porsche Curves and spun, losing him the LMP2 lead to the No. 26 G-Drive car of Roman Rusinov. The safety cars were once again required for a short period of time as Kraihamer's No. 32 Lotus T128 shed its rear bodywork on the Mulsanne Straight and nullifying Tréluyer and Jarvis' advantage because Duval returned to second after he made a pit stop during the period. When racing resumed, Duval reset the fastest lap of the race to 3:23.269 as Bruno Senna's No. 99 Aston Martin traded the lead of LMGTE Pro with Dumbreck's No. 97 car for two laps. Two of the three contenders for the outright victory had trouble soon after. Jarvis' No. 3 Audi made contact with an LMP2 vehicle while scything his way through slower traffic and his right-rear tyre was punctured when a tyre valve was removed and Jarvis spun under the Dunlop Bridge. The tyre carcass fell off as he returned to the pit lane though repairs to the rear of the car were deemed unnecessary by his crew and the car returned to the circuit in fourth overall. On the 100th lap, the No. 1 Audi of Tréluyer was forced into the garage for 43 minutes to replace a failed crankshaft position sensor and gave the lead back to the sister No. 2 Audi of Duval and Sarrazin's No. 8 Toyota took over second. The car dropped to 24th and fell 12 laps down. Darryl O'Young had been the fastest driver in LMGTE Am at the time and brought the No. 55 AF Corse Ferrari into the class lead.

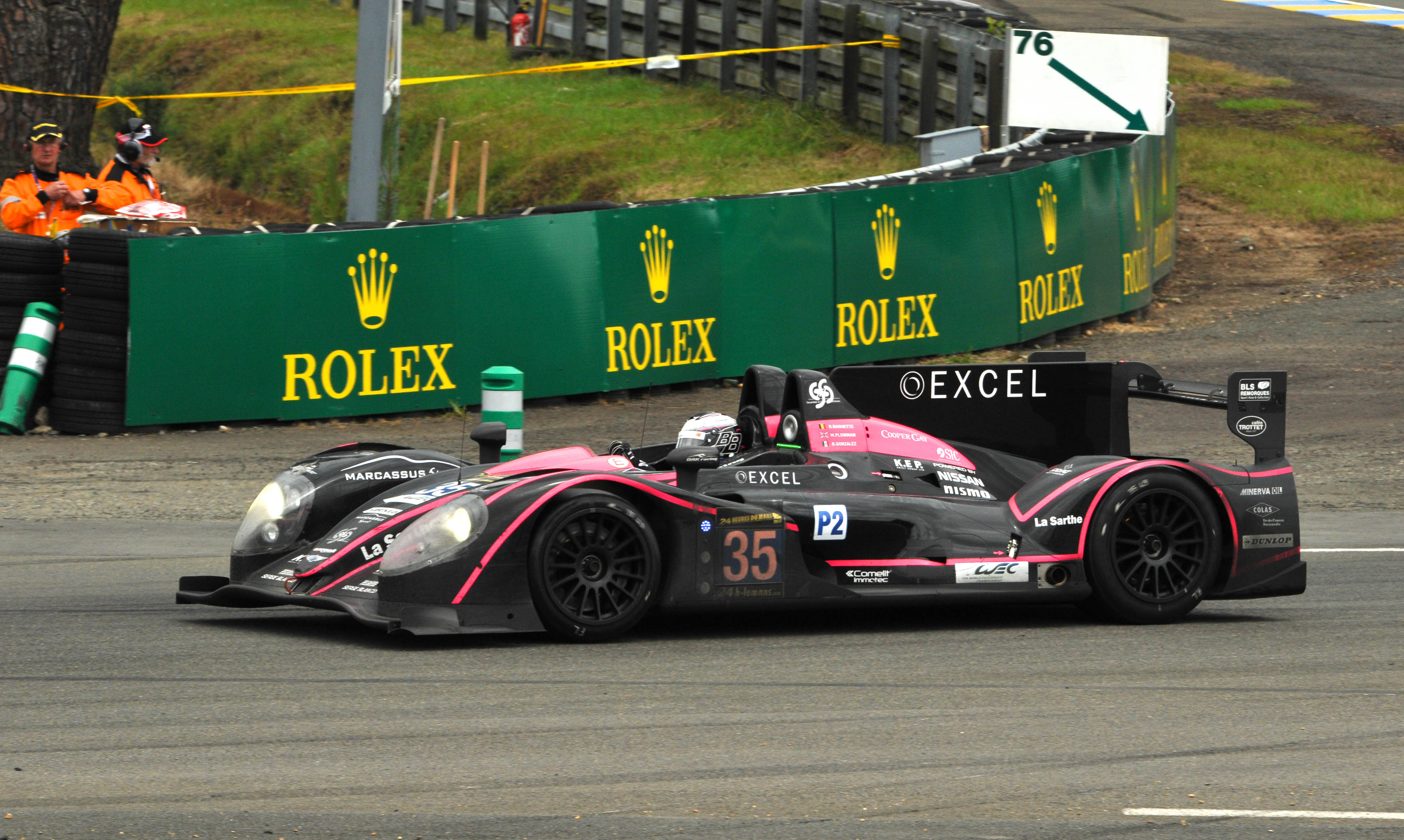
The LMP2 class-winning No. 35 OAK Racing Morgan of Bertrand Baguette, Martin Plowman and Ricardo González.

John Martin's No. 26 G-Drive entry ceded the lead of LMP2 to Baguette's No. 35 OAK Racing car when he was instructed to enter the pit lane to have an illuminated door number panel repaired, which took two laps to complete. The safety cars were deployed for a fourth time after 8 hours and 50 minutes when Graves spun the No. 25 Delta-ADR vehicle into the barriers at the Porsche Curves and scattered debris on the track. In the outright lead, the safety cars divided the field into two with Kristensen increasing his lead to three minutes and seven seconds over Sarrazin. Safety cars were required once again at the close of the ninth hour when Krohn spun and crashed his Ferrari in the Porsche Curves and retired. Racing resumed ten minutes into hour ten with Gianluca Roda beaching the No. 88 Porsche into the gravel trap at the Dunlop Bridge and allowing actor Patrick Dempsey in the No. 77 Dempsey Proton car into the lead of LMGTE Am. Turner ran the No. 97 Aston Martin into the gravel at Mulsanne corner, allowing Lieb's No. 91 Porsche to pass him for second in LMGTE Pro. In LMGTE Am, Lorenzo Casè's No. 55 AF Corse Ferrari returned to the category lead when Dempsey made a scheduled pit stop for fuel. For 21 minutes, safety cars were needed as Tony Burgess destroyed the rear of the No. 30 HVM Status Lola in the Porsche Curves. Burgess was unhurt and he was transported to hospital for a precautionary check-up. Burgess had sustained severe bruising in the accident.

As the race approached its halfway point, Howard Blank significantly damaged the No. 54 AF Corse Ferrari as well as the catchfencing at the Dunlop Esses and Tetre Rouge corner, causing an event record seventh safety car period. Blank was unhurt and attempted a return to the pit lane but he could not do so and retired. During the safety car period, the No. 99 Aston Martin had its brake discs changed and gave the LMGTE Pro lead to the No. 92 Porsche. The safety cars were due to be withdrawn just before the conclusion of hour 13 but heavy rain over much of the circuit extended it by nine minutes and several teams installed wet-weather tyres on their cars. Two laps after racing resumed, Lapierre's No. 7 Toyota got ahead of his teammate Buemi for second overall and he maintained it until Buemi retook the position. Before the close of the 14th hour, Kane spun and beached the No. 21 Strakka car in the gravel trap at the Ford Chicane but got the car back onto the circuit. Romain Brandela's No. 39 DKR Engineering Lola piled into the No. 55 AF Corse Ferrari and the No. 88 Proton Porsche before swerving in the front of Buemi's No. 8 Toyota at the Dunlop chicane. Luhr's No. 38 Jota Sport Zytek bowed out of a battle with the No. 42 Greaves Zytek of Michael Krumm for third in LMP2 when he entered the garage for repairs to his front-right wishbone wheel bearing during the 15th hour.

=== Morning to early afternoon ===
In the 16th hour, Richard Lietz brought the No. 92 Porsche to the pit lane and had its brake discs changed in four minutes, giving the lead of LMGTE Pro to Senna's No. 99 Aston Martin, which held a three-quarters of a minute advantage over him but Lietz lowered it to six seconds by the hour's end. Light rain returned during the 17th hour but it was not heavy enough to affect the race. In LMGTE Am, Bourret led in the No. 76 IMSA Performance Matmut Porsche by a lap over Lorenzo Casè's No. 55 AF Corse Ferrari while Dempsey in his No. 77 Porsche was being closed on by Marco Cioci's No. 61 car. The 18th hour commenced with Auberlen's No. 98 Aston Martin emitting smoke from the car and leaking a large amount of oil down the Mulsanne Straight before stopping at Mulsanne corner. The safety cars were dispatched for 25 minutes to allow the oil to be dried by track marshals. Racing resumed for only half a minute as the safety cars were needed to tend to repairs to a heavily damaged trackside barrier exiting the second Mulsanne chicane; Belicchi was about to lap a slower GTE Porsche but lost traction at the rear of the No. 13 Rebellion and veered right into a barrier. He returned to the pit lane for extensive repairs to the car's front. When racing resumed, Lietz retook the LMGTE Pro lead. He held it until his spin at the Dunlop chicane delayed Dumbreck, allowing Senna in the class lead and Timo Bernhard's No. 91 Porsche into second.

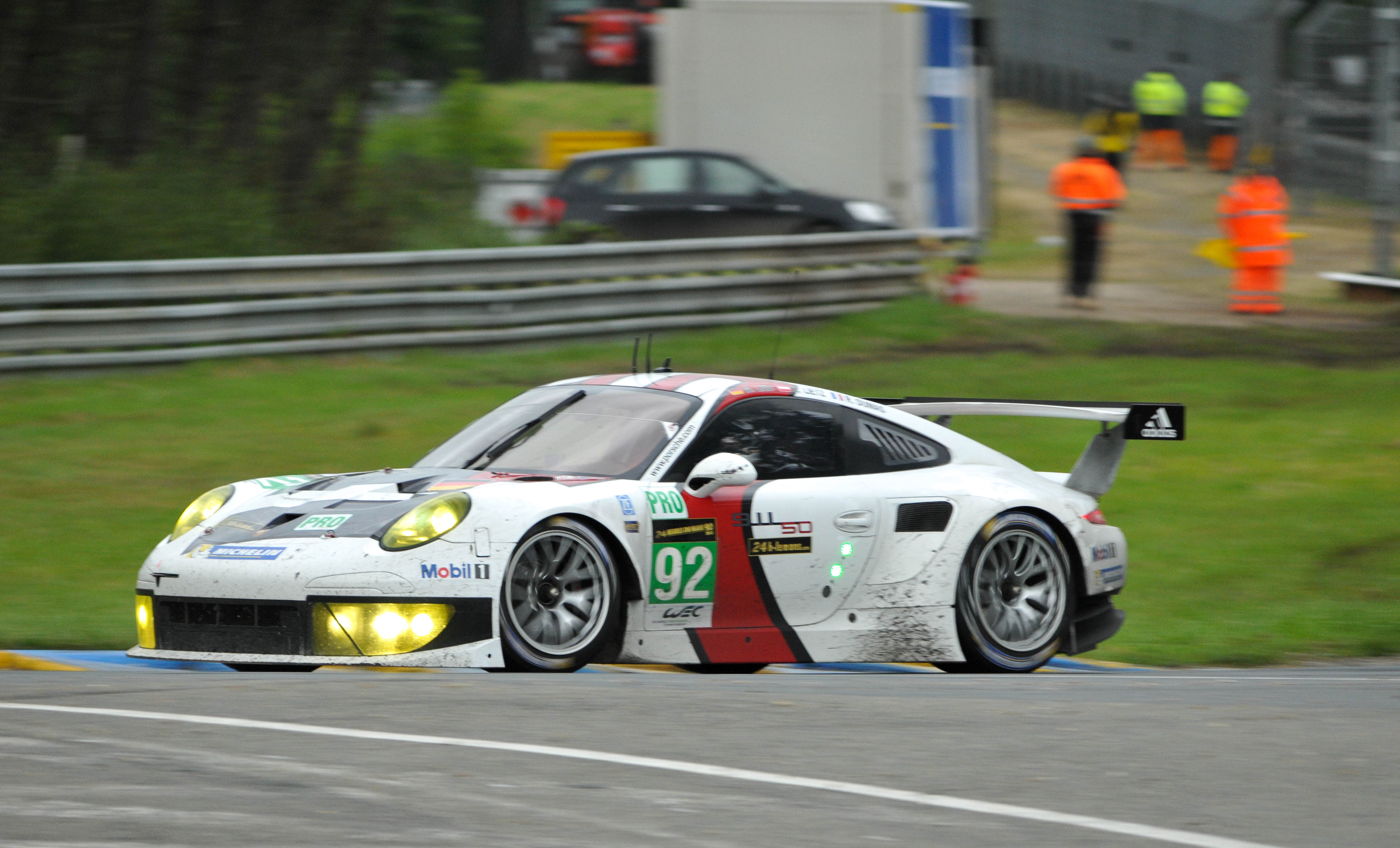
The No. 92 Porsche 991 of Marc Lieb, Richard Lietz and Romain Dumas won the LMGTE Pro class.

After the safety cars were withdrawn, Makowiecki relieved Senna in the No. 99 Aston Martin and pulled away from Lieb's No. 92 Porsche. Rain again fell on the circuit with five hours and fifteen minutes to go and some cars were caught out in the change of weather. Makowiecki veered to the left coming out of the second Mulsanne chicane as he attempted to rectify a loose exit from the earlier chicane and collided with a barrier head-on. That ricocheted the car back to the centre of the track. Makowiecki was unhurt but the safety cars were again required as repairs were made to the wall and Lieb became the new LMGTE Pro leader as the No. 99 Aston Martin was retired because of the extensive damage to the car. After racing continued, Nakajima's No. 7 Toyota cut the Dunlop chicane and launched over the kerb and spun backwards across the circuit. He rejoined without losing third. The rain eased and track conditions improved as Turner reduced Lieb's advantage at the front of LMGTE Pro to 8.8 seconds by the end of the 20th hour. In the 21st hour, a miscommunication with the mechanics of Matteo Malucelli's No. 51 AF Corse Ferrari in his pit box released him with the fuelling hose attached to the car and into a collision with the No. 45 OAK Racing Morgan of Philippe Mondolot. Rain returned to the circuit during the hour. The No. 1 Audi of Lotterer aquaplaned into a gravel trap and narrowly avoided piling into Davidson's No. 8 Toyota on the Mulsanne Straight.

The No. 3 Audi of Jarvis moved past Lapierre's No. 7 Toyota for third during pit stop rotation and Lapierre went off at the exit of Indianapolis corner as he battled to retake the position. Kristensen's No. 2 Audi made a pit stop for a slow puncture as heavy rain returned with 90 minutes left and several cars aquaplaned on the saturated circuit. Lapierre's No. 7 Toyota had no grip on the run into the Porsche Curves when he ran onto a damp patch and veered deep left into the tyre wall at high speed. He exited the car but returned to it after two minutes. Baguette had an anxious moment going into Indianapolis turn in the No. 35 OAK Racing car but kept the LMP2 lead over his teammate Pla's sister No. 24 car. The safety cars were again dispatched as the LMGTE Pro lead returned to Lieb's No. 91 Porsche from Mücke's No. 97 Aston Martin in pit stop rotation. During the safety car period, Pla's No. 25 OAK Racing entry was separated from his teammate Baguette and was four minutes behind as the No. 6 Toyota was repaired in its garage and returned in fourth. Just before the safety cars entered the pit lane with half an hour to go, the No. 97 Aston Martin made a pit stop for tyres and made the LMGTE Pro battle against the two lead Porsches. More rain began to fall 15 minutes later and it turned into a deluge over the entire circuit as Kristensen's No. 2 Audi began the final lap.

=== Finish ===
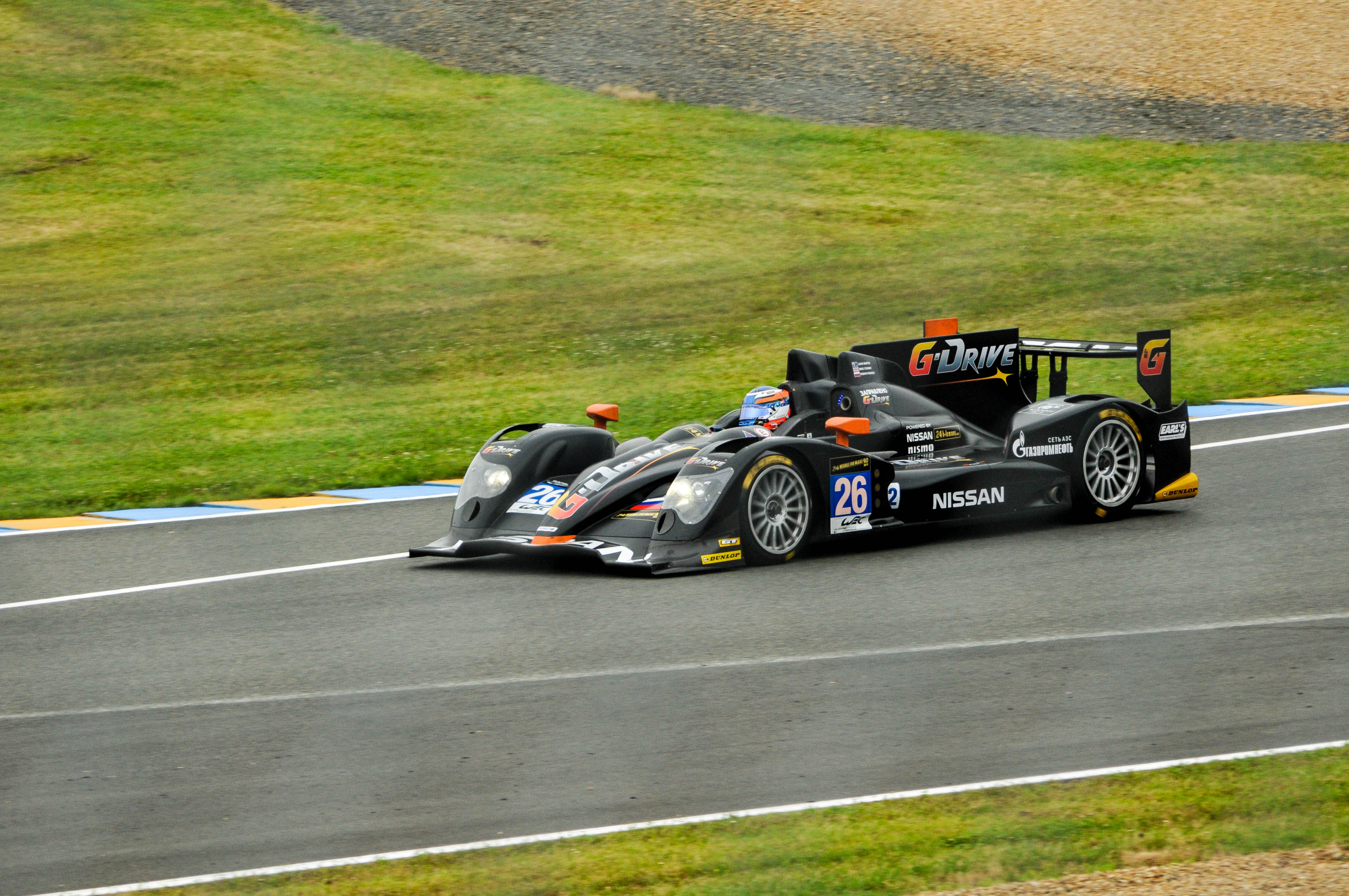
The No. 26 G-Drive Racing Oreca 03 was disqualified from third in LMP2 because of an oversized fuel tank.

The No. 2 Audi of Kristensen, Duval and McNish led the final 248 laps to claim the manufacturer's twelfth victory at Le Mans since its first at the 2000 race. It was Kristensen's ninth and last overall victory, McNish's third and Duval's first. Buemi unlapped himself from Kristensen in the final half an hour but fell back a lap soon after to avoid completing an additional lap at the finish. He, Davidson and Sarrazin's No. 8 Toyota finished second and the No. 3 Audi of di Grassi, Jarvis and Gené completed the overall podium in third. The No. 21 Strakka HPD ARX-03c of Kane, Danny Watts and Nick Leventis was unhindered after the demise of Rebellion and won the privateer LMP1 category in sixth overall. OAK Racing won the LMP2 class with the No. 35 Morgan of Baugette, Ricardo González and Martin Plowman and the team's second car of Pla, Heinememer Hansson and Brundle was a lap behind for a second-place finish. John Martin, Conway and Rusinov finished third in class in the No. 26 G-Drive Oreca but the car was disqualified because its fuel tank was found to be over the mandated limit of 75 L (16 imp gal; 20 US gal), promoting the No. 42 Greaves Zytek of Mardenborough, Krumm and Lucas Ordóñez to the category podium. In LMGTE Pro, Porsche Manthey Racing claimed the category win on the Le Mans debut of the new 991-generation race car with drivers Lieb, Lietz and Romain Dumas in the No. 92 car, while the LMGTE Am class increased Porsche's total class victories at Le Mans to 100 with the No. 76 IMSA Performance entry of Jean-Karl Vernay, Raymond Narac and Bourret winning. Of the 56 qualifying cars, 13 did not finish and one did not complete a sufficient distance to get classified.

== Post-race ==
On the podium, the Danish flag was flown at half-mast in memory of Simonsen by the ACO and Kristensen dedicated the victory to him. There was a standing ovation for Simonsen, and no champagne was sprayed on the podium. McNish remarked that winning three times "sounds much better than two." Kristensen expressed pride of driving for Audi and its drivers and factory staff, "They make it possible for us to realise a dream. Now this dream has come true again – winning the fastest and toughest race under the direction of Dr. Wolfgang Ullrich." Duval called it "a difficult race" because of Simonsen's death but stated that his maiden Le Mans win was "a really great moment" in his career. Davidson said Toyota's car did not have the ultimate pace to achieve victory and was aware of the fact when the manufacturer arrived at Le Mans, adding, "but we didn’t give up, we kept pushing and we knew this was a race in which anything can happen."

Allan Simonsen was mourned by the motorsport community. A memorial foundation was established in his honour by the Danish Automobile Sports Union and he was given a funeral in his hometown of Odense in Southern Denmark on 2 July. Following Simonsen's death, the ACO announced the improvements to several sections of the circuit in December 2013. Tertre Rouge was re-profiled and new barriers and tire walls were added at the corner's exit onto the Mulsanne Straight. Run-off areas in the Corvette corners were expanded, and TecPro barriers were added behind the tire walls at the start of the Porsche corners. Large kerbs were added to the paved run-off at the second Ford chicane to deter cars from cutting the corner. A new safety system was implemented, which allowed for the intervention of safety vehicles on a particular section of the circuit without the need for neutralising the entire race with safety cars. The system, termed a slow zone, requires cars to slow and maintain a speed of 60 km/h (37 mph) within a specific zone.

With their victory, Kristensen, McNish and Duval became the new leaders of the Drivers' Championship with 94 points. Lotterer, Fässler and Tréluyer fell to second and were thirty points behind their teammates. Davidson, Sarrazin and Buemi's second-place result enabled the trio to remain in third while di Grassi, Gené and Jarvis' third-position result allowed them to advance from sixth to fourth. Wurz and Lapierre rounded out the top five drivers in the championship standings. In the Manufacturers' Championship, Audi kept their lead with 102 points but increased it to thirty-five points over Toyota with five rounds left in the season.

== Official results ==
Class winners are marked in bold. Cars failing to complete 70 per cent (244 laps) of winner's distance are marked as Not Classified (NC).

Final race classification
Pos	Class	No.	Team	Drivers	Chassis	Tyre	Laps	Time/Retired
Pos	Class	No.	Team	Drivers	Engine	Tyre	Laps	Time/Retired
1	**LMP1**	**2**	**(Germany) Audi Sport Team Joest**	**(United Kingdom) Allan McNish (Denmark) Tom Kristensen (France) Loïc Duval**	**Audi R18 e-tron quattro**	M	**348**	**24:01'16.436**
1	**LMP1**	**2**	**(Germany) Audi Sport Team Joest**	**(United Kingdom) Allan McNish (Denmark) Tom Kristensen (France) Loïc Duval**	**Audi TDI 3.7 L Turbo V6 (Hybrid Diesel)**	M	**348**	**24:01'16.436**
2	LMP1	8	(Japan) Toyota Racing	(United Kingdom) Anthony Davidson (France) Stéphane Sarrazin (Switzerland) Sébastien Buemi	Toyota TS030 Hybrid	M	347	+1 Lap
2	LMP1	8	(Japan) Toyota Racing	(United Kingdom) Anthony Davidson (France) Stéphane Sarrazin (Switzerland) Sébastien Buemi	Toyota 3.4 L V8 (Hybrid)	M	347	+1 Lap
3	LMP1	3	(Germany) Audi Sport Team Joest	(Spain) Marc Gené (United Kingdom) Oliver Jarvis (Brazil) Lucas di Grassi	Audi R18 e-tron quattro	M	347	+1 Lap
3	LMP1	3	(Germany) Audi Sport Team Joest	(Spain) Marc Gené (United Kingdom) Oliver Jarvis (Brazil) Lucas di Grassi	Audi TDI 3.7 L Turbo V6 (Hybrid Diesel)	M	347	+1 Lap
4	LMP1	7	(Japan) Toyota Racing	(Austria) Alexander Wurz (France) Nicolas Lapierre (Japan) Kazuki Nakajima	Toyota TS030 Hybrid	M	341	+7 Laps
4	LMP1	7	(Japan) Toyota Racing	(Austria) Alexander Wurz (France) Nicolas Lapierre (Japan) Kazuki Nakajima	Toyota 3.4 L V8 (Hybrid)	M	341	+7 Laps
5	LMP1	1	(Germany) Audi Sport Team Joest	(Germany) André Lotterer (Switzerland) Marcel Fässler (France) Benoît Tréluyer	Audi R18 e-tron quattro	M	338	+10 Laps
5	LMP1	1	(Germany) Audi Sport Team Joest	(Germany) André Lotterer (Switzerland) Marcel Fässler (France) Benoît Tréluyer	Audi TDI 3.7 L Turbo V6 (Hybrid Diesel)	M	338	+10 Laps
6	LMP1	21	(United Kingdom) Strakka Racing	(United Kingdom) Nick Leventis (United Kingdom) Jonny Kane (United Kingdom) Danny Watts	HPD ARX-03c	M	332	+16 Laps
6	LMP1	21	(United Kingdom) Strakka Racing	(United Kingdom) Nick Leventis (United Kingdom) Jonny Kane (United Kingdom) Danny Watts	Honda LM-V8 3.4 L V8	M	332	+16 Laps
7	**LMP2**	**35**	**(France) OAK Racing**	**(Belgium) Bertrand Baguette (United Kingdom) Martin Plowman (Mexico) Ricardo González**	**Morgan LMP2**	D	**329**	**+19 Laps**
7	**LMP2**	**35**	**(France) OAK Racing**	**(Belgium) Bertrand Baguette (United Kingdom) Martin Plowman (Mexico) Ricardo González**	**Nissan VK45DE 4.5 L V8**	D	**329**	**+19 Laps**
8	LMP2	24	(France) OAK Racing	(France) Olivier Pla (United Kingdom) Alex Brundle (Denmark) David Heinemeier Hansson	Morgan LMP2	D	328	+20 Laps
8	LMP2	24	(France) OAK Racing	(France) Olivier Pla (United Kingdom) Alex Brundle (Denmark) David Heinemeier Hansson	Nissan VK45DE 4.5 L V8	D	328	+20 Laps
9	LMP2	42	(United Kingdom) Greaves Motorsport	(Germany) Michael Krumm (United Kingdom) Jann Mardenborough (Spain) Lucas Ordóñez	Zytek Z11SN	D	327	+21 Laps
9	LMP2	42	(United Kingdom) Greaves Motorsport	(Germany) Michael Krumm (United Kingdom) Jann Mardenborough (Spain) Lucas Ordóñez	Nissan VK45DE 4.5 L V8	D	327	+21 Laps
10	LMP2	49	(Argentina) PeCom Racing	(Argentina) Luis Pérez Companc (Germany) Pierre Kaffer (France) Nicolas Minassian	Oreca 03	M	325	+23 Laps
10	LMP2	49	(Argentina) PeCom Racing	(Argentina) Luis Pérez Companc (Germany) Pierre Kaffer (France) Nicolas Minassian	Nissan VK45DE 4.5 L V8	M	325	+23 Laps
11	LMP2	43	(Switzerland) Morand Racing	(Switzerland) Natacha Gachnang (France) Franck Mailleux (France) Olivier Lombard	Morgan LMP2	D	320	+28 Laps
11	LMP2	43	(Switzerland) Morand Racing	(Switzerland) Natacha Gachnang (France) Franck Mailleux (France) Olivier Lombard	Judd HK 3.6 L V8	D	320	+28 Laps
12	LMP2	48	(Republic of Ireland) Murphy Prototypes	(New Zealand) Brendon Hartley (India) Karun Chandhok (United States) Mark Patterson	Oreca 03	D	319	+29 Laps
12	LMP2	48	(Republic of Ireland) Murphy Prototypes	(New Zealand) Brendon Hartley (India) Karun Chandhok (United States) Mark Patterson	Nissan VK45DE 4.5 L V8	D	319	+29 Laps
13	LMP2	38	(United Kingdom) Jota Sport	(United Kingdom) Simon Dolan (United Kingdom) Oliver Turvey (Germany) Lucas Luhr	Zytek Z11SN	D	319	+29 Laps
13	LMP2	38	(United Kingdom) Jota Sport	(United Kingdom) Simon Dolan (United Kingdom) Oliver Turvey (Germany) Lucas Luhr	Nissan VK45DE 4.5 L V8	D	319	+29 Laps
14	LMP2	36	(France) Signatech-Alpine	(France) Pierre Ragues (France) Nelson Panciatici (France) Tristan Gommendy	Alpine A450	M	317	+31 Laps
14	LMP2	36	(France) Signatech-Alpine	(France) Pierre Ragues (France) Nelson Panciatici (France) Tristan Gommendy	Nissan VK45DE 4.5 L V8	M	317	+31 Laps
15	**LMGTE; Pro**	**92**	**(Germany) Porsche AG Team Manthey**	**(Germany) Marc Lieb (Austria) Richard Lietz (France) Romain Dumas**	**Porsche 911 RSR**	M	**315**	**+33 Laps**
15	**LMGTE; Pro**	**92**	**(Germany) Porsche AG Team Manthey**	**(Germany) Marc Lieb (Austria) Richard Lietz (France) Romain Dumas**	**Porsche 4.0 L Flat-6**	M	**315**	**+33 Laps**
16	LMGTE; Pro	91	(Germany) Porsche AG Team Manthey	(Germany) Jörg Bergmeister (Germany) Timo Bernhard (France) Patrick Pilet	Porsche 911 RSR	M	315	+33 Laps
16	LMGTE; Pro	91	(Germany) Porsche AG Team Manthey	(Germany) Jörg Bergmeister (Germany) Timo Bernhard (France) Patrick Pilet	Porsche 4.0 L Flat-6	M	315	+33 Laps
17	LMGTE; Pro	97	(United Kingdom) Aston Martin Racing	(United Kingdom) Darren Turner (United Kingdom) Peter Dumbreck (Germany) Stefan Mücke	Aston Martin Vantage GTE	M	314	+34 Laps
17	LMGTE; Pro	97	(United Kingdom) Aston Martin Racing	(United Kingdom) Darren Turner (United Kingdom) Peter Dumbreck (Germany) Stefan Mücke	Aston Martin 4.5 L V8	M	314	+34 Laps
18	LMP2	34	(Switzerland) Race Performance	(Switzerland) Michel Frey (Switzerland) Patric Niederhauser (Netherlands) Jeroen Bleekemolen	Oreca 03	D	314	+34 Laps
18	LMP2	34	(Switzerland) Race Performance	(Switzerland) Michel Frey (Switzerland) Patric Niederhauser (Netherlands) Jeroen Bleekemolen	Judd HK 3.6 L V8	D	314	+34 Laps
19	LMGTE; Pro	73	(United States) Corvette Racing	(Spain) Antonio García (Denmark) Jan Magnussen (United States) Jordan Taylor	Chevrolet Corvette C6.R	M	312	+36 Laps
19	LMGTE; Pro	73	(United States) Corvette Racing	(Spain) Antonio García (Denmark) Jan Magnussen (United States) Jordan Taylor	Chevrolet 5.5 L V8	M	312	+36 Laps
20	LMGTE; Pro	71	(Italy) AF Corse	(Monaco) Olivier Beretta (Japan) Kamui Kobayashi (Finland) Toni Vilander	Ferrari 458 Italia GT2	M	312	+36 Laps
20	LMGTE; Pro	71	(Italy) AF Corse	(Monaco) Olivier Beretta (Japan) Kamui Kobayashi (Finland) Toni Vilander	Ferrari 4.5 L V8	M	312	+36 Laps
21	LMGTE; Pro	51	(Italy) AF Corse	(Italy) Gianmaria Bruni (Italy) Giancarlo Fisichella (Italy) Matteo Malucelli	Ferrari 458 Italia GT2	M	311	+37 Laps
21	LMGTE; Pro	51	(Italy) AF Corse	(Italy) Gianmaria Bruni (Italy) Giancarlo Fisichella (Italy) Matteo Malucelli	Ferrari 4.5 L V8	M	311	+37 Laps
22	LMGTE; Pro	74	(United States) Corvette Racing	(United Kingdom) Oliver Gavin (United Kingdom) Richard Westbrook (United States) Tommy Milner	Chevrolet Corvette C6.R	M	309	+39 Laps
22	LMGTE; Pro	74	(United States) Corvette Racing	(United Kingdom) Oliver Gavin (United Kingdom) Richard Westbrook (United States) Tommy Milner	Chevrolet 5.5 L V8	M	309	+39 Laps
23	LMP2	41	(United Kingdom) Greaves Motorsport	(United States) Alexander Rossi (United States) Eric Lux (United Kingdom) Tom Kimber-Smith	Zytek Z11SN	D	307	+41 Laps
23	LMP2	41	(United Kingdom) Greaves Motorsport	(United States) Alexander Rossi (United States) Eric Lux (United Kingdom) Tom Kimber-Smith	Nissan VK45DE 4.5 L V8	D	307	+41 Laps
24	LMGTE; Pro	53	(United States) SRT Motorsports	(Belgium) Marc Goossens (Germany) Dominik Farnbacher (United Kingdom) Ryan Dalziel	SRT Viper GTS-R	M	306	+42 Laps
24	LMGTE; Pro	53	(United States) SRT Motorsports	(Belgium) Marc Goossens (Germany) Dominik Farnbacher (United Kingdom) Ryan Dalziel	SRT 8.0 L V10	M	306	+42 Laps
25	**LMGTE; Am**	**76**	**(France) IMSA Performance Matmut**	**(France) Raymond Narac (France) Christophe Bourret (France) Jean-Karl Vernay**	**Porsche 997 GT3 RSR**	M	**306**	**+42 Laps**
25	**LMGTE; Am**	**76**	**(France) IMSA Performance Matmut**	**(France) Raymond Narac (France) Christophe Bourret (France) Jean-Karl Vernay**	**Porsche 4.0 L Flat-6**	M	**306**	**+42 Laps**
26	LMGTE; Am	55	(Italy) AF Corse	(Italy) Piergiuseppe Perazzini (Italy) Lorenzo Casè (Hong Kong) Darryl O'Young	Ferrari 458 Italia GT2	M	305	+43 Laps
26	LMGTE; Am	55	(Italy) AF Corse	(Italy) Piergiuseppe Perazzini (Italy) Lorenzo Casè (Hong Kong) Darryl O'Young	Ferrari 4.5 L V8	M	305	+43 Laps
27	LMGTE; Am	61	(Italy) AF Corse	(South Africa) Jack Gerber (Republic of Ireland) Matt Griffin (Italy) Marco Cioci	Ferrari 458 Italia GT2	M	305	+43 Laps
27	LMGTE; Am	61	(Italy) AF Corse	(South Africa) Jack Gerber (Republic of Ireland) Matt Griffin (Italy) Marco Cioci	Ferrari 4.5 L V8	M	305	+43 Laps
28	LMGTE; Am	77	(United States) Dempsey Del Piero-Proton	(United States) Patrick Dempsey (United States) Patrick Long (United States) Joe Foster	Porsche 997 GT3 RSR	M	305	+43 Laps
28	LMGTE; Am	77	(United States) Dempsey Del Piero-Proton	(United States) Patrick Dempsey (United States) Patrick Long (United States) Joe Foster	Porsche 4.0 L Flat-6	M	305	+43 Laps
29	LMGTE; Am	50	(France) Larbre Compétition	(France) Julien Canal (France) Patrick Bornhauser (United States) Ricky Taylor	Chevrolet Corvette C6.R	M	302	+46 Laps
29	LMGTE; Am	50	(France) Larbre Compétition	(France) Julien Canal (France) Patrick Bornhauser (United States) Ricky Taylor	Chevrolet 5.5 L V8	M	302	+46 Laps
30	LMGTE; Am	96	(United Kingdom) Aston Martin Racing	(Germany) Roald Goethe (United Kingdom) Jamie Campbell-Walter (United Kingdom) Stuart Hall	Aston Martin Vantage GTE	M	301	+47 Laps
30	LMGTE; Am	96	(United Kingdom) Aston Martin Racing	(Germany) Roald Goethe (United Kingdom) Jamie Campbell-Walter (United Kingdom) Stuart Hall	Aston Martin 4.5 L V8	M	301	+47 Laps
31	LMGTE; Pro	93	(United States) SRT Motorsports	(United States) Tommy Kendall (United States) Jonathan Bomarito (Canada) Kuno Wittmer	SRT Viper GTS-R	M	301	+47 Laps
31	LMGTE; Pro	93	(United States) SRT Motorsports	(United States) Tommy Kendall (United States) Jonathan Bomarito (Canada) Kuno Wittmer	SRT 8.0 L V10	M	301	+47 Laps
32	LMP2	40	(Belgium) Boutsen Ginion Racing	(France) Thomas Dagoneau (United States) Matt Downs (United States) Rodin Younessi	Oreca 03	D	300	+48 Laps
32	LMP2	40	(Belgium) Boutsen Ginion Racing	(France) Thomas Dagoneau (United States) Matt Downs (United States) Rodin Younessi	Nissan VK45DE 4.5 L V8	D	300	+48 Laps
33	LMGTE; Am	67	(France) IMSA Performance Matmut	(France) Pascal Gibon (France) Patrice Milesi (Germany) Wolf Henzler	Porsche 997 GT3 RSR	M	300	+48 Laps
33	LMGTE; Am	67	(France) IMSA Performance Matmut	(France) Pascal Gibon (France) Patrice Milesi (Germany) Wolf Henzler	Porsche 4.0 L Flat-6	M	300	+48 Laps
34	LMGTE; Pro	66	(United Kingdom) JMW Motorsport	(Italy) Andrea Bertolini (Saudi Arabia) Abdulaziz al Faisal (United Arab Emirates) Khaled Al Qubaisi	Ferrari 458 Italia GT2	D	300	+48 Laps
34	LMGTE; Pro	66	(United Kingdom) JMW Motorsport	(Italy) Andrea Bertolini (Saudi Arabia) Abdulaziz al Faisal (United Arab Emirates) Khaled Al Qubaisi	Ferrari 4.5 L V8	D	300	+48 Laps
35	LMGTE; Am	88	(Germany) Proton Competition	(Germany) Christian Ried (Italy) Gianluca Roda (Italy) Paolo Ruberti	Porsche 997 GT3 RSR	M	300	+48 Laps
35	LMGTE; Am	88	(Germany) Proton Competition	(Germany) Christian Ried (Italy) Gianluca Roda (Italy) Paolo Ruberti	Porsche 4.0 L Flat-6	M	300	+48 Laps
36	LMGTE; Am	75	(Belgium) Prospeed Competition	(France) Emmanuel Collard (France) François Perrodo (France) Sebastien Crubilé	Porsche 997 GT3 RSR	M	298	+50 Laps
36	LMGTE; Am	75	(Belgium) Prospeed Competition	(France) Emmanuel Collard (France) François Perrodo (France) Sebastien Crubilé	Porsche 4.0 L Flat-6	M	298	+50 Laps
37	LMGTE; Am	81	(United States) 8 Star Motorsports	(Venezuela) Enzo Potolicchio (Portugal) Rui Águas (Australia) Jason Bright	Ferrari 458 Italia GT2	M	294	+54 Laps
37	LMGTE; Am	81	(United States) 8 Star Motorsports	(Venezuela) Enzo Potolicchio (Portugal) Rui Águas (Australia) Jason Bright	Ferrari 4.5 L V8	M	294	+54 Laps
38	LMP2	39	(Luxembourg) DKR Engineering	(France) Olivier Porta (France) Romain Brandela (France) Stéphane Raffin	Lola B11/40	D	280	+68 Laps
38	LMP2	39	(Luxembourg) DKR Engineering	(France) Olivier Porta (France) Romain Brandela (France) Stéphane Raffin	Judd HK 3.6 L V8	D	280	+68 Laps
39	LMP1	12	(Switzerland) Rebellion Racing	(France) Nicolas Prost (Switzerland) Neel Jani (Germany) Nick Heidfeld	Lola B12/60	M	275	+73 Laps
39	LMP1	12	(Switzerland) Rebellion Racing	(France) Nicolas Prost (Switzerland) Neel Jani (Germany) Nick Heidfeld	Toyota RV8KLM 3.4 L V8	M	275	+73 Laps
40	LMP1	13	(Switzerland) Rebellion Racing	(Switzerland) Mathias Beche (Italy) Andrea Belicchi (China) Congfu Cheng	Lola B12/60	M	275	+73 Laps
40	LMP1	13	(Switzerland) Rebellion Racing	(Switzerland) Mathias Beche (Italy) Andrea Belicchi (China) Congfu Cheng	Toyota RV8KLM 3.4 L V8	M	275	+73 Laps
41	LMGTE; Am	70	(France) Larbre Compétition	(United States) Cooper MacNeil (France) Manuel Rodrigues (France) Philippe Dumas	Chevrolet Corvette C6.R	M	268	+80 Laps
41	LMGTE; Am	70	(France) Larbre Compétition	(United States) Cooper MacNeil (France) Manuel Rodrigues (France) Philippe Dumas	Chevrolet 5.5 L V8	M	268	+80 Laps
NC	LMP2	33	(United States) Level 5 Motorsports	(United States) Scott Tucker (United Kingdom) Marino Franchitti (Australia) Ryan Briscoe	HPD ARX-03b	M	242	Insufficient distance
NC	LMP2	33	(United States) Level 5 Motorsports	(United States) Scott Tucker (United Kingdom) Marino Franchitti (Australia) Ryan Briscoe	Honda HR28TT 2.8 L Turbo V6	M	242	Insufficient distance
DNF	LMP2	46	(France) Thiriet by TDS Racing	(France) Pierre Thiriet (France) Ludovic Badey (Belgium) Maxime Martin	Oreca 03	D	310	Accident
DNF	LMP2	46	(France) Thiriet by TDS Racing	(France) Pierre Thiriet (France) Ludovic Badey (Belgium) Maxime Martin	Nissan VK45DE 4.5 L V8	D	310	Accident
DNF	LMGTE; Pro	99	(United Kingdom) Aston Martin Racing	(Brazil) Bruno Senna (France) Frédéric Makowiecki (United Kingdom) Rob Bell	Aston Martin Vantage GTE	M	248	Accident
DNF	LMGTE; Pro	99	(United Kingdom) Aston Martin Racing	(Brazil) Bruno Senna (France) Frédéric Makowiecki (United Kingdom) Rob Bell	Aston Martin 4.5 L V8	M	248	Accident
DNF	LMP2	45	(France) OAK Racing	(France) Jacques Nicolet (France) Jean-Marc Merlin (France) Philippe Mondolot	Morgan LMP2	D	246	Accident
DNF	LMP2	45	(France) OAK Racing	(France) Jacques Nicolet (France) Jean-Marc Merlin (France) Philippe Mondolot	Nissan VK45DE 4.5 L V8	D	246	Accident
DNF	LMP2	47	(China) KCMG	(Switzerland) Alexandre Imperatori (United Kingdom) Matt Howson (Netherlands) Ho-Pin Tung	Morgan LMP2	M	241	Oil leak
DNF	LMP2	47	(China) KCMG	(Switzerland) Alexandre Imperatori (United Kingdom) Matt Howson (Netherlands) Ho-Pin Tung	Nissan VK45DE 4.5 L V8	M	241	Oil leak
DNF	LMGTE; Pro	98	(United Kingdom) Aston Martin Racing	(Canada) Paul Dalla Lana (United States) Bill Auberlen (Portugal) Pedro Lamy	Aston Martin Vantage GTE	M	221	Engine
DNF	LMGTE; Pro	98	(United Kingdom) Aston Martin Racing	(Canada) Paul Dalla Lana (United States) Bill Auberlen (Portugal) Pedro Lamy	Aston Martin 4.5 L V8	M	221	Engine
DNF	LMP2	32	(Czech Republic) Lotus	(Germany) Thomas Holzer (Austria) Dominik Kraihamer (Czech Republic) Jan Charouz	Lotus T128	D	219	Gearbox
DNF	LMP2	32	(Czech Republic) Lotus	(Germany) Thomas Holzer (Austria) Dominik Kraihamer (Czech Republic) Jan Charouz	Praga 3.6 L V8	D	219	Gearbox
DNF	LMP2	30	(Canada) HVM Status GP	(United Kingdom) Johnny Mowlem (Canada) Tony Burgess (Switzerland) Jonathan Hirschi	Lola B12/80	D	153	Accident
DNF	LMP2	30	(Canada) HVM Status GP	(United Kingdom) Johnny Mowlem (Canada) Tony Burgess (Switzerland) Jonathan Hirschi	Judd HK 3.6 L V8	D	153	Accident
DNF	LMGTE; Am	54	(Italy) AF Corse	(France) Yannick Mallégol (France) Jean-Marc Bachelier (United States) Howard Blank	Ferrari 458 Italia GT2	M	147	Accident
DNF	LMGTE; Am	54	(Italy) AF Corse	(France) Yannick Mallégol (France) Jean-Marc Bachelier (United States) Howard Blank	Ferrari 4.5 L V8	M	147	Accident
DNF	LMGTE; Am	57	(United States) Krohn Racing	(United States) Tracy Krohn (Sweden) Niclas Jönsson (Italy) Maurizio Mediani	Ferrari 458 Italia GT2	M	111	Accident
DNF	LMGTE; Am	57	(United States) Krohn Racing	(United States) Tracy Krohn (Sweden) Niclas Jönsson (Italy) Maurizio Mediani	Ferrari 4.5 L V8	M	111	Accident
DNF	LMP2	25	(United Kingdom) Delta-ADR	(Thailand) Tor Graves (United Kingdom) Archie Hamilton (Japan) Shinji Nakano	Oreca 03	D	101	Accident
DNF	LMP2	25	(United Kingdom) Delta-ADR	(Thailand) Tor Graves (United Kingdom) Archie Hamilton (Japan) Shinji Nakano	Nissan VK45DE 4.5 L V8	D	101	Accident
DNF	LMP2	28	(United Arab Emirates) Gulf Racing Middle East	(France) Fabien Giroix (France) Philippe Haezebrouck (Japan) Keiko Ihara	Lola B12/80	D	22	Accident
DNF	LMP2	28	(United Arab Emirates) Gulf Racing Middle East	(France) Fabien Giroix (France) Philippe Haezebrouck (Japan) Keiko Ihara	Nissan VK45DE 4.5 L V8	D	22	Accident
DNF	LMP2	31	(Czech Republic) Lotus	(United States) Kevin Weeda (United Kingdom) James Rossiter (France) Christophe Bouchut	Lotus T128	D	17	Electrical
DNF	LMP2	31	(Czech Republic) Lotus	(United States) Kevin Weeda (United Kingdom) James Rossiter (France) Christophe Bouchut	Praga 3.6 L V8	D	17	Electrical
DNF	LMGTE; Am	95	(United Kingdom) Aston Martin Racing	(Denmark) Allan Simonsen (Denmark) Kristian Poulsen (Denmark) Christoffer Nygaard	Aston Martin Vantage GTE	M	2	Fatal accident, Simonsen
DNF	LMGTE; Am	95	(United Kingdom) Aston Martin Racing	(Denmark) Allan Simonsen (Denmark) Kristian Poulsen (Denmark) Christoffer Nygaard	Aston Martin 4.5 L V8	M	2	Fatal accident, Simonsen
EX	LMP2	26	(Russia) G-Drive Racing	(Russia) Roman Rusinov (Australia) John Martin (United Kingdom) Mike Conway	Oreca 03	M	–	Disqualified (Note: The No. 26 G-Drive Racing Oreca 03 was disqualified as its fuel tanks was found to exceed the maximum limit of 75 L (16 imp gal; 20 US gal).)
EX	LMP2	26	(Russia) G-Drive Racing	(Russia) Roman Rusinov (Australia) John Martin (United Kingdom) Mike Conway	Nissan VK45DE 4.5 L V8	M	–	Disqualified

Tyre manufacturers
Key
Symbol	Tyre manufacturer
**D**	Dunlop
**M**	Michelin

== Standings after the race ==
World Endurance Drivers' Championship standings
Pos.	+/–	Driver	Points
1	1	(United Kingdom) Allan McNish (Denmark) Tom Kristensen (France) Loïc Duval	94
2	1	(Germany) André Lotterer (Switzerland) Marcel Fässler (France) Benoît Tréluyer	64
3		(United Kingdom) Anthony Davidson (France) Stéphane Sarrazin (Switzerland) Sébastien Buemi	63
4	2	(Brazil) Lucas di Grassi (Spain) Marc Gené (United Kingdom) Oliver Jarvis	45
5	2	(Austria) Alexander Wurz (France) Nicolas Lapierre	37

World Endurance Manufacturers' Championship standings
Pos.	+/–	Constructor	Points
1		(Germany) Audi	102
2		(Japan) Toyota	67

== Footnotes ==
FIA World Endurance Championship
Previous race: 6 Hours of Spa-Francorchamps	2013 season	Next race: 6 Hours of São Paulo
