= Alain Filhol =

French former racing driver (born 1951)

Alain Filhol (born 15 May 1951) is a French former racing driver.
