= 2013 6 Hours of Circuit of the Americas =

Endurance sportscar racing event in Austin, Texas

Circuit of the Americas

The 2013 6 Hours of Circuit of the Americas was an endurance auto race held at the Circuit of the Americas in Austin, Texas on 20–22 September 2013.

== Qualifying ==
=== Qualifying result ===
Pole position winners in each class are marked in bold.

Pos	Class	Team	Average Time	Grid
1	**LMP1**	**No. 2 Audi Sport Team Joest**	**1:48.355**	1
2	LMP1	No. 1 Audi Sport Team Joest	1:48.617	2
3	LMP1	No. 8 Toyota Racing	1:49.696	3
4	LMP1	No. 12 Rebellion Racing	1:52.081	4
5	**LMP2**	**No. 26 G-Drive Racing**	**1:54.951**	5
6	LMP2	No. 24 OAK Racing	1:55.961	6
7	LMP2	No. 35 OAK Racing	1:56.033	7
8	LMP2	No. 49 Pecom Racing	1:56.248	8
9	LMP2	No. 25 Delta-ADR	1:57.067	9
10	LMP2	No. 31 Lotus	1:57.817	10
11	LMP2	No. 41 Greaves Motorsport	1:57.940	11
12	LMP2	No. 32 Lotus	1:59.453	12
13	**LMGTE Pro**	**No. 99 Aston Martin Racing**	**2:04.628**	14
14	LMGTE Pro	No. 91 Porsche AG Team Manthey	2:04.898	15
15	LMGTE Pro	No. 98 Aston Martin Racing	2:04.919	16
16	LMGTE Pro	No. 71 AF Corse	2:05.073	17
17	LMGTE Pro	No. 92 Porsche AG Team Manthey	2:05.088	18
18	LMGTE Pro	No. 97 Aston Martin Racing	2:05.214	19
19	LMGTE Pro	No. 51 AF Corse	2:05.348	20
20	**LMGTE Am**	**No. 81 8 Star Motorsports**	**2:06.515**	21
21	LMGTE Am	No. 95 Aston Martin Racing	2:06.528	22
22	LMGTE Am	No. 61 AF Corse	2:06.593	23
23	LMGTE Am	No. 96 Aston Martin Racing	2:07.117	24
24	LMGTE Am	No. 76 IMSA Performance Matmut	2:07.120	25
25	LMGTE Am	No. 88 Proton Competition	2:07.931	26
26	LMGTE Am	No. 50 Larbre Compétition	2:08.132	27
27	LMGTE Am	No. 57 Krohn Racing	2:10.029	28
28	LMP2	No. 45 OAK Racing	2:00.870	13

== Race ==
=== Race result ===
Class winners in bold. Cars failing to complete 70% of winner's distance marked as Not Classified (NC).

Pos	Class	No	Team	Drivers	Chassis	Tyre	Laps
Pos	Class	No	Team	Drivers	Engine	Tyre	Laps
1	**LMP1**	**2**	**(Germany) Audi Sport Team Joest**	**(United Kingdom) Allan McNish (Denmark) Tom Kristensen (France) Loïc Duval**	**Audi R18 e-tron quattro**	M	**187**
1	**LMP1**	**2**	**(Germany) Audi Sport Team Joest**	**(United Kingdom) Allan McNish (Denmark) Tom Kristensen (France) Loïc Duval**	**Audi TDI 3.7 L Turbo V6 (Hybrid Diesel)**	M	**187**
2	LMP1	8	(Japan) Toyota Racing	(United Kingdom) Anthony Davidson (Switzerland) Sébastien Buemi (France) Stéphane Sarrazin	Toyota TS030 Hybrid	M	187
2	LMP1	8	(Japan) Toyota Racing	(United Kingdom) Anthony Davidson (Switzerland) Sébastien Buemi (France) Stéphane Sarrazin	Toyota 3.4 L V8 (Hybrid)	M	187
3	LMP1	1	(Germany) Audi Sport Team Joest	(Germany) André Lotterer (Switzerland) Marcel Fässler (France) Benoît Tréluyer	Audi R18 e-tron quattro	M	186
3	LMP1	1	(Germany) Audi Sport Team Joest	(Germany) André Lotterer (Switzerland) Marcel Fässler (France) Benoît Tréluyer	Audi TDI 3.7 L Turbo V6 (Hybrid Diesel)	M	186
4	LMP1	12	(Switzerland) Rebellion Racing	(France) Nicolas Prost (Germany) Nick Heidfeld (Switzerland) Mathias Beche	Lola B12/60	M	183
4	LMP1	12	(Switzerland) Rebellion Racing	(France) Nicolas Prost (Germany) Nick Heidfeld (Switzerland) Mathias Beche	Toyota RV8KLM 3.4 L V8	M	183
5	**LMP2**	**26**	**(Russia) G-Drive Racing**	**(Russia) Roman Rusinov (Australia) John Martin (United Kingdom) Mike Conway**	**Oreca 03**	D	**178**
5	**LMP2**	**26**	**(Russia) G-Drive Racing**	**(Russia) Roman Rusinov (Australia) John Martin (United Kingdom) Mike Conway**	**Nissan VK45DE 4.5 L V8**	D	**178**
6	LMP2	49	(Argentina) Pecom Racing	(Argentina) Luís Pérez Companc (Germany) Pierre Kaffer (France) Nicolas Minassian	Oreca 03	M	177
6	LMP2	49	(Argentina) Pecom Racing	(Argentina) Luís Pérez Companc (Germany) Pierre Kaffer (France) Nicolas Minassian	Nissan VK45DE 4.5 L V8	M	177
7	LMP2	32	(Czech Republic) Lotus	(Germany) Thomas Holzer (Austria) Dominik Kraihamer (Czech Republic) Jan Charouz	Lotus T128	D	174
7	LMP2	32	(Czech Republic) Lotus	(Germany) Thomas Holzer (Austria) Dominik Kraihamer (Czech Republic) Jan Charouz	Praga 3.6 L V8	D	174
8	LMP2	25	(United Kingdom) Delta-ADR	(Thailand) Tor Graves (United Kingdom) James Walker (Mexico) Rudy Junco	Oreca 03	D	173
8	LMP2	25	(United Kingdom) Delta-ADR	(Thailand) Tor Graves (United Kingdom) James Walker (Mexico) Rudy Junco	Nissan VK45DE 4.5 L V8	D	173
9	LMP2	41	(United Kingdom) Greaves Motorsport	(Germany) Christian Zugel (United States) Chris Dyson (United Kingdom) Tom Kimber-Smith	Zytek Z11SN	D	172
9	LMP2	41	(United Kingdom) Greaves Motorsport	(Germany) Christian Zugel (United States) Chris Dyson (United Kingdom) Tom Kimber-Smith	Nissan VK45DE 4.5 L V8	D	172
10	LMP2	24	(France) OAK Racing	(France) Olivier Pla (United Kingdom) Alex Brundle (Denmark) David Heinemeier Hansson	Morgan LMP2	D	172
10	LMP2	24	(France) OAK Racing	(France) Olivier Pla (United Kingdom) Alex Brundle (Denmark) David Heinemeier Hansson	Nissan VK45DE 4.5 L V8	D	172
11	LMP2	35	(France) OAK Racing	(Belgium) Bertrand Baguette (United Kingdom) Martin Plowman (Mexico) Ricardo González	Morgan LMP2	D	170
11	LMP2	35	(France) OAK Racing	(Belgium) Bertrand Baguette (United Kingdom) Martin Plowman (Mexico) Ricardo González	Nissan VK45DE 4.5 L V8	D	170
12	**LMGTE; Pro**	**99**	**(United Kingdom) Aston Martin Racing**	**(Brazil) Bruno Senna (France) Frédéric Makowiecki**	**Aston Martin Vantage GTE**	M	**167**
12	**LMGTE; Pro**	**99**	**(United Kingdom) Aston Martin Racing**	**(Brazil) Bruno Senna (France) Frédéric Makowiecki**	**Aston Martin 4.5 L V8**	M	**167**
13	LMGTE; Pro	51	(Italy) AF Corse	(Italy) Gianmaria Bruni (Italy) Giancarlo Fisichella	Ferrari 458 Italia GT2	M	167
13	LMGTE; Pro	51	(Italy) AF Corse	(Italy) Gianmaria Bruni (Italy) Giancarlo Fisichella	Ferrari 4.5 L V8	M	167
14	LMGTE; Pro	71	(Italy) AF Corse	(Japan) Kamui Kobayashi (Finland) Toni Vilander	Ferrari 458 Italia GT2	M	167
14	LMGTE; Pro	71	(Italy) AF Corse	(Japan) Kamui Kobayashi (Finland) Toni Vilander	Ferrari 4.5 L V8	M	167
15	LMGTE; Pro	92	(Germany) Porsche AG Team Manthey	(Germany) Marc Lieb (Austria) Richard Lietz	Porsche 911 RSR	M	167
15	LMGTE; Pro	92	(Germany) Porsche AG Team Manthey	(Germany) Marc Lieb (Austria) Richard Lietz	Porsche 4.0 L Flat-6	M	167
16	**LMGTE; Am**	**96**	**(United Kingdom) Aston Martin Racing**	**(United Kingdom) Jamie Campbell-Walter (United Kingdom) Stuart Hall**	**Aston Martin Vantage GTE**	M	**165**
16	**LMGTE; Am**	**96**	**(United Kingdom) Aston Martin Racing**	**(United Kingdom) Jamie Campbell-Walter (United Kingdom) Stuart Hall**	**Aston Martin 4.5 L V8**	M	**165**
17	LMGTE; Am	95	(United Kingdom) Aston Martin Racing	(Denmark) Kristian Poulsen (Denmark) Christoffer Nygaard (Denmark) Nicki Thiim	Aston Martin Vantage GTE	M	165
17	LMGTE; Am	95	(United Kingdom) Aston Martin Racing	(Denmark) Kristian Poulsen (Denmark) Christoffer Nygaard (Denmark) Nicki Thiim	Aston Martin 4.5 L V8	M	165
18	LMGTE; Am	76	(France) IMSA Performance Matmut	(France) Raymond Narac (France) Jean-Karl Vernay	Porsche 997 GT3-RSR	M	165
18	LMGTE; Am	76	(France) IMSA Performance Matmut	(France) Raymond Narac (France) Jean-Karl Vernay	Porsche 4.0 L Flat-6	M	165
19	LMGTE; Am	81	(United States) 8 Star Motorsports	(Venezuela) Enzo Potolicchio (Portugal) Rui Águas (Italy) Matteo Malucelli	Ferrari 458 Italia GT2	M	164
19	LMGTE; Am	81	(United States) 8 Star Motorsports	(Venezuela) Enzo Potolicchio (Portugal) Rui Águas (Italy) Matteo Malucelli	Ferrari 4.5 L V8	M	164
20	LMGTE; Pro	91	(Germany) Porsche AG Team Manthey	(Germany) Jörg Bergmeister (France) Patrick Pilet	Porsche 911 RSR	M	163
20	LMGTE; Pro	91	(Germany) Porsche AG Team Manthey	(Germany) Jörg Bergmeister (France) Patrick Pilet	Porsche 4.0 L Flat-6	M	163
21	LMGTE; Am	88	(Germany) Proton Competition	(Germany) Christian Ried (Italy) Gianluca Roda (Italy) Paolo Ruberti	Porsche 997 GT3-RSR	M	163
21	LMGTE; Am	88	(Germany) Proton Competition	(Germany) Christian Ried (Italy) Gianluca Roda (Italy) Paolo Ruberti	Porsche 4.0 L Flat-6	M	163
22	LMGTE; Am	50	(France) Larbre Compétition	(France) Julien Canal (France) Patrick Bornhauser (Brazil) Fernando Rees	Chevrolet Corvette C6.R	M	163
22	LMGTE; Am	50	(France) Larbre Compétition	(France) Julien Canal (France) Patrick Bornhauser (Brazil) Fernando Rees	Chevrolet 5.5 L V8	M	163
23	LMGTE; Am	61	(Italy) AF Corse	(South Africa) Jack Gerber (Republic of Ireland) Matt Griffin (Italy) Marco Cioci	Ferrari 458 Italia GT2	M	162
23	LMGTE; Am	61	(Italy) AF Corse	(South Africa) Jack Gerber (Republic of Ireland) Matt Griffin (Italy) Marco Cioci	Ferrari 4.5 L V8	M	162
24	LMGTE; Am	57	(United States) Krohn Racing	(United States) Tracy Krohn (Sweden) Niclas Jönsson (Italy) Maurizio Mediani	Ferrari 458 Italia GT2	M	156
24	LMGTE; Am	57	(United States) Krohn Racing	(United States) Tracy Krohn (Sweden) Niclas Jönsson (Italy) Maurizio Mediani	Ferrari 4.5 L V8	M	156
25	LMP2	45	(France) OAK Racing	(France) Jacques Nicolet (France) Jean-Marc Merlin (France) Erik Maris	Morgan LMP2	D	148
25	LMP2	45	(France) OAK Racing	(France) Jacques Nicolet (France) Jean-Marc Merlin (France) Erik Maris	Nissan VK45DE 4.5 L V8	D	148
DNF	LMGTE; Pro	97	(United Kingdom) Aston Martin Racing	(United Kingdom) Darren Turner (Germany) Stefan Mücke (United Kingdom) Oliver Gavin	Aston Martin Vantage GTE	M	118
DNF	LMGTE; Pro	97	(United Kingdom) Aston Martin Racing	(United Kingdom) Darren Turner (Germany) Stefan Mücke (United Kingdom) Oliver Gavin	Aston Martin 4.5 L V8	M	118
DNF	LMGTE; Pro	98	(United Kingdom) Aston Martin Racing	(Canada) Paul Dalla Lana (Portugal) Pedro Lamy (New Zealand) Richie Stanaway	Aston Martin Vantage GTE	M	84
DNF	LMGTE; Pro	98	(United Kingdom) Aston Martin Racing	(Canada) Paul Dalla Lana (Portugal) Pedro Lamy (New Zealand) Richie Stanaway	Aston Martin 4.5 L V8	M	84
DNS	LMP2	31	(Czech Republic) Lotus	(United States) Kevin Weeda (Italy) Vitantonio Liuzzi (United Kingdom) James Rossiter	Lotus T128	D	–
DNS	LMP2	31	(Czech Republic) Lotus	(United States) Kevin Weeda (Italy) Vitantonio Liuzzi (United Kingdom) James Rossiter	Praga 3.6 L V8	D	–

FIA World Endurance Championship
Previous race: 6 Hours of São Paulo	2013 season	Next race: 6 Hours of Fuji
