= 2013 6 Hours of Silverstone =

Sports car endurance race held at Silverstone Circuit, Northamptonshire, England

Map of the Silverstone Grand Prix Circuit

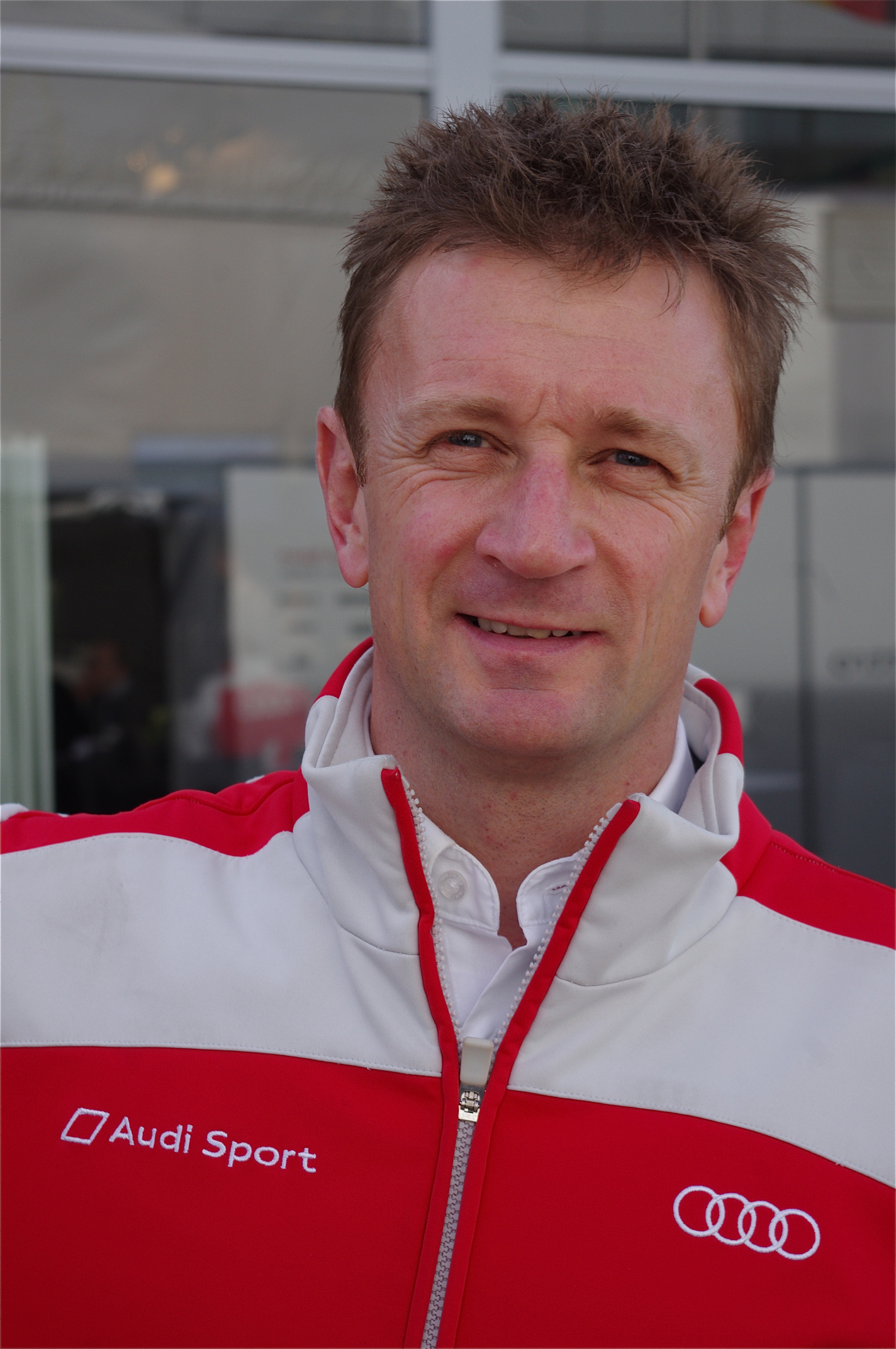
Allan McNish, one of three drivers for Audi Sport Team Joest's winning Audi R18 e-tron quattro

The 2013 6 Hours of Silverstone was an auto racing event held at the Silverstone Circuit, near Silverstone, England on 12–14 April 2013. The event was the opening round of the 2013 FIA World Endurance Championship season, and served as the annual award for the Royal Automobile Club's Tourist Trophy. Briton Allan McNish, Dane Tom Kristensen, and Frenchman Loïc Duval won the race for Audi, just over three seconds ahead of their teammates. The British Delta-ADR team were victorious in the LMP2 category, while Aston Martin Racing secured both the LMGTE Pro and LMGTE Am classes.

The event weekend was shared with the European Le Mans Series, which ran the 3 Hours of Silverstone, and the FIA European Formula 3 Championship.

== Qualifying ==
The 6 Hours of Silverstone was the first instance in which the WEC utilized a new qualifying procedure in which two drivers were required to set laps during the qualifying session. The grid would then be determined by averaging the total of the two best laps set by each of the drivers. Following the Silverstone qualifying session, several drivers felt the new format was too risky as all teams only had enough time to set four laps during the wet session. The FIA later announced that qualifying would be extended by ten minutes for the next round at Spa to allow teams more leeway.

=== Qualifying result ===
Pole position winners in each class are marked in bold.

Pos	Class	Team	Average Time	Grid
1	**LMP1**	**No. 7 Toyota Racing**	**1:48.021**	1
2	LMP1	No. 8 Toyota Racing	1:49.995	2
3	LMP1	No. 2 Audi Sport Team Joest	1:51.283	3
4	LMP1	No. 12 Rebellion Racing	1:52.124	4
5	LMP1	No. 1 Audi Sport Team Joest	1:53.488	5
6	LMP1	No. 13 Rebellion Racing	1:53.835	6
7	**LMP2**	**No. 25 Delta-ADR**	**1:55.148**	7
8	LMP2	No. 24 OAK Racing	1:57.629	8
9	LMP2	No. 26 G-Drive Racing	1:57.697	9
10	LMP2	No. 35 OAK Racing	1:58.729	10
11	**LMGTE Pro**	**No. 97 Aston Martin Racing**	**2:00.566**	11
12	LMGTE Pro	No. 99 Aston Martin Racing	2:00.722	12
13	**LMGTE Am**	**No. 96 Aston Martin Racing**	**2:01.158**	13
14	LMGTE Pro	No. 91 Porsche Team Manthey	2:01.308	14
15	LMGTE Pro	No. 92 Porsche Team Manthey	2:01.452	15
16	LMGTE Pro	No. 51 AF Corse	2:01.512	16
17	LMGTE Am	No. 95 Aston Martin Racing	2:01.544	17
18	LMP2	No. 32 Lotus	2:01.555	18
19	LMGTE Pro	No. 71 AF Corse	2:01.803	19
20	LMP2	No. 31 Lotus	2:02.144	20
21	LMGTE Am	No. 61 AF Corse	2:02.396	21
22	LMP2	No. 49 Pecom Racing	2:02.454	22
23	LMGTE Am	No. 81 8 Star Motorsports	2:02.513	23
24	LMGTE Am	No. 50 Larbre Compétition	2:02.862	24
25	LMP2	No. 47 KCMG	2:02.991	25
26	LMGTE Am	No. 76 IMSA Performance Matmut	2:04.176	26
27	LMP2	No. 41 Greaves Motorsport	2:04.491	27
28	LMGTE Am	No. 57 Krohn Racing	2:05.482	28
29	LMP2	No. 45 OAK Racing	2:10.475	29
30	LMP1	No. 21 Strakka Racing	No Time	30
–	LMGTE Am	No. 88 Proton Competition	Did Not Participate	31

== Race ==
=== Race result ===
Class winners in bold. Cars failing to complete 70% of winner's distance marked as Not Classified (NC).

Pos	Class	No	Team	Drivers	Chassis	Tyre	Laps
Pos	Class	No	Team	Drivers	Engine	Tyre	Laps
1	**LMP1**	**2**	**(Germany) Audi Sport Team Joest**	**(United Kingdom) Allan McNish (Denmark) Tom Kristensen (France) Loïc Duval**	**Audi R18 e-tron quattro**	MI	**197**
1	**LMP1**	**2**	**(Germany) Audi Sport Team Joest**	**(United Kingdom) Allan McNish (Denmark) Tom Kristensen (France) Loïc Duval**	**Audi TDI 3.7 L Turbo V6 (Hybrid Diesel)**	MI	**197**
2	LMP1	1	(Germany) Audi Sport Team Joest	(Germany) André Lotterer (Switzerland) Marcel Fässler (France) Benoît Tréluyer	Audi R18 e-tron quattro	MI	197
2	LMP1	1	(Germany) Audi Sport Team Joest	(Germany) André Lotterer (Switzerland) Marcel Fässler (France) Benoît Tréluyer	Audi TDI 3.7 L Turbo V6 (Hybrid Diesel)	MI	197
3	LMP1	8	(Japan) Toyota Racing	(United Kingdom) Anthony Davidson (France) Stéphane Sarrazin (Switzerland) Sébastien Buemi	Toyota TS030 Hybrid	MI	196
3	LMP1	8	(Japan) Toyota Racing	(United Kingdom) Anthony Davidson (France) Stéphane Sarrazin (Switzerland) Sébastien Buemi	Toyota 3.4 L V8 (Hybrid)	MI	196
4	LMP1	7	(Japan) Toyota Racing	(Austria) Alexander Wurz (France) Nicolas Lapierre	Toyota TS030 Hybrid	MI	196
4	LMP1	7	(Japan) Toyota Racing	(Austria) Alexander Wurz (France) Nicolas Lapierre	Toyota 3.4 L V8 (Hybrid)	MI	196
5	LMP1	12	(Switzerland) Rebellion Racing	(France) Nicolas Prost (Switzerland) Neel Jani (Germany) Nick Heidfeld	Lola B12/60	MI	193
5	LMP1	12	(Switzerland) Rebellion Racing	(France) Nicolas Prost (Switzerland) Neel Jani (Germany) Nick Heidfeld	Toyota RV8KLM 3.4 L V8	MI	193
6	LMP1	13	(Switzerland) Rebellion Racing	(Italy) Andrea Belicchi (Switzerland) Mathias Beche (China) Congfu Cheng	Lola B12/60	MI	190
6	LMP1	13	(Switzerland) Rebellion Racing	(Italy) Andrea Belicchi (Switzerland) Mathias Beche (China) Congfu Cheng	Toyota RV8KLM 3.4 L V8	MI	190
7	**LMP2**	**25**	**(United Kingdom) Delta-ADR**	**(Thailand) Tor Graves (Brazil) Antônio Pizzonia (United Kingdom) James Walker**	**Oreca 03**	D	**184**
7	**LMP2**	**25**	**(United Kingdom) Delta-ADR**	**(Thailand) Tor Graves (Brazil) Antônio Pizzonia (United Kingdom) James Walker**	**Nissan VK45DE 4.5 L V8**	D	**184**
8	LMP2	24	(France) OAK Racing	(France) Olivier Pla (United Kingdom) Alex Brundle (Denmark) David Heinemeier Hansson	Morgan LMP2	D	183
8	LMP2	24	(France) OAK Racing	(France) Olivier Pla (United Kingdom) Alex Brundle (Denmark) David Heinemeier Hansson	Nissan VK45DE 4.5 L V8	D	183
9	LMP2	49	(Argentina) Pecom Racing	(Argentina) Luís Pérez Companc (Germany) Pierre Kaffer (France) Nicolas Minassian	Oreca 03	MI	179
9	LMP2	49	(Argentina) Pecom Racing	(Argentina) Luís Pérez Companc (Germany) Pierre Kaffer (France) Nicolas Minassian	Nissan VK45DE 4.5 L V8	MI	179
10	LMP2	35	(France) OAK Racing	(Belgium) Bertrand Baguette (United Kingdom) Martin Plowman (Mexico) Ricardo González	Morgan LMP2	D	179
10	LMP2	35	(France) OAK Racing	(Belgium) Bertrand Baguette (United Kingdom) Martin Plowman (Mexico) Ricardo González	Nissan VK45DE 4.5 L V8	D	179
11	LMP2	41	(United Kingdom) Greaves Motorsport	(United Kingdom) Tom Kimber-Smith (United States) Chris Dyson (United States) Michael Marsal	Zytek Z11SN	D	179
11	LMP2	41	(United Kingdom) Greaves Motorsport	(United Kingdom) Tom Kimber-Smith (United States) Chris Dyson (United States) Michael Marsal	Nissan VK45DE 4.5 L V8	D	179
12	LMP2	47	(Hong Kong) KCMG	(Switzerland) Alexandre Imperatori (United Kingdom) Matthew Howson (China) Jim Ka To	Morgan LMP2	MI	179
12	LMP2	47	(Hong Kong) KCMG	(Switzerland) Alexandre Imperatori (United Kingdom) Matthew Howson (China) Jim Ka To	Nissan VK45DE 4.5 L V8	MI	179
13	LMP2	26	(Russia) G-Drive Racing	(Russia) Roman Rusinov (Australia) John Martin (United Kingdom) Mike Conway	Oreca 03	D	176
13	LMP2	26	(Russia) G-Drive Racing	(Russia) Roman Rusinov (Australia) John Martin (United Kingdom) Mike Conway	Nissan VK45DE 4.5 L V8	D	176
14	**LMGTE; Pro**	**97**	**(United Kingdom) Aston Martin Racing**	**(United Kingdom) Darren Turner (Germany) Stefan Mücke (Brazil) Bruno Senna**	**Aston Martin Vantage GTE**	MI	**171**
14	**LMGTE; Pro**	**97**	**(United Kingdom) Aston Martin Racing**	**(United Kingdom) Darren Turner (Germany) Stefan Mücke (Brazil) Bruno Senna**	**Aston Martin 4.5 L V8**	MI	**171**
15	LMGTE; Pro	71	(Italy) AF Corse	(Japan) Kamui Kobayashi (Finland) Toni Vilander	Ferrari 458 Italia GT2	MI	170
15	LMGTE; Pro	71	(Italy) AF Corse	(Japan) Kamui Kobayashi (Finland) Toni Vilander	Ferrari 4.5 L V8	MI	170
16	LMGTE; Pro	99	(United Kingdom) Aston Martin Racing	(France) Frédéric Makowiecki (Canada) Paul Dalla Lana (Portugal) Pedro Lamy	Aston Martin Vantage GTE	MI	170
16	LMGTE; Pro	99	(United Kingdom) Aston Martin Racing	(France) Frédéric Makowiecki (Canada) Paul Dalla Lana (Portugal) Pedro Lamy	Aston Martin 4.5 L V8	MI	170
17	LMGTE; Pro	92	(Germany) Porsche Team Manthey	(Germany) Marc Lieb (Austria) Richard Lietz (France) Romain Dumas	Porsche 911 RSR	MI	170
17	LMGTE; Pro	92	(Germany) Porsche Team Manthey	(Germany) Marc Lieb (Austria) Richard Lietz (France) Romain Dumas	Porsche 4.0 L Flat-6	MI	170
18	LMGTE; Pro	51	(Italy) AF Corse	(Italy) Gianmaria Bruni (Italy) Giancarlo Fisichella	Ferrari 458 Italia GT2	MI	170
18	LMGTE; Pro	51	(Italy) AF Corse	(Italy) Gianmaria Bruni (Italy) Giancarlo Fisichella	Ferrari 4.5 L V8	MI	170
19	**LMGTE; Am**	**95**	**(United Kingdom) Aston Martin Racing**	**(Denmark) Allan Simonsen (Denmark) Kristian Poulsen (Denmark) Christoffer Nygaard**	**Aston Martin Vantage GTE**	MI	**169**
19	**LMGTE; Am**	**95**	**(United Kingdom) Aston Martin Racing**	**(Denmark) Allan Simonsen (Denmark) Kristian Poulsen (Denmark) Christoffer Nygaard**	**Aston Martin 4.5 L V8**	MI	**169**
20	LMGTE; Pro	91	(Germany) Porsche Team Manthey	(Germany) Jörg Bergmeister (France) Patrick Pilet (Germany) Timo Bernhard	Porsche 911 RSR	MI	168
20	LMGTE; Pro	91	(Germany) Porsche Team Manthey	(Germany) Jörg Bergmeister (France) Patrick Pilet (Germany) Timo Bernhard	Porsche 4.0 L Flat-6	MI	168
21	LMGTE; Am	50	(France) Larbre Compétition	(France) Julien Canal (France) Patrick Bornhauser (Brazil) Fernando Rees	Chevrolet Corvette C6.R	MI	166
21	LMGTE; Am	50	(France) Larbre Compétition	(France) Julien Canal (France) Patrick Bornhauser (Brazil) Fernando Rees	Chevrolet 5.5 L V8	MI	166
22	LMGTE; Am	81	(United States) 8 Star Motorsports	(Venezuela) Enzo Potolicchio (Portugal) Rui Águas (Austria) Philipp Peter	Ferrari 458 Italia GT2	MI	165
22	LMGTE; Am	81	(United States) 8 Star Motorsports	(Venezuela) Enzo Potolicchio (Portugal) Rui Águas (Austria) Philipp Peter	Ferrari 4.5 L V8	MI	165
23	LMGTE; Am	96	(United Kingdom) Aston Martin Racing	(Germany) Roald Goethe (United Kingdom) Jamie Campbell-Walter (United Kingdom) Stuart Hall	Aston Martin Vantage GTE	MI	165
23	LMGTE; Am	96	(United Kingdom) Aston Martin Racing	(Germany) Roald Goethe (United Kingdom) Jamie Campbell-Walter (United Kingdom) Stuart Hall	Aston Martin 4.5 L V8	MI	165
24	LMGTE; Am	88	(Germany) Proton Competition	(Germany) Christian Ried (Italy) Gianluca Roda (Italy) Paolo Ruberti	Porsche 997 GT3-RSR	MI	165
24	LMGTE; Am	88	(Germany) Proton Competition	(Germany) Christian Ried (Italy) Gianluca Roda (Italy) Paolo Ruberti	Porsche 4.0 L Flat-6	MI	165
25	LMGTE; Am	57	(United States) Krohn Racing	(United States) Tracy Krohn (Sweden) Niclas Jönsson (Italy) Maurizio Mediani	Ferrari 458 Italia GT2	MI	164
25	LMGTE; Am	57	(United States) Krohn Racing	(United States) Tracy Krohn (Sweden) Niclas Jönsson (Italy) Maurizio Mediani	Ferrari 4.5 L V8	MI	164
26	LMGTE; Am	76	(France) IMSA Performance Matmut	(France) Raymond Narac (France) Christophe Bourret (France) Jean-Karl Vernay	Porsche 997 GT3-RSR	MI	163
26	LMGTE; Am	76	(France) IMSA Performance Matmut	(France) Raymond Narac (France) Christophe Bourret (France) Jean-Karl Vernay	Porsche 4.0 L Flat-6	MI	163
27	LMP2	45	(France) OAK Racing	(France) Jacques Nicolet (France) Jean-Marc Merlin	Morgan LMP2	D	154
27	LMP2	45	(France) OAK Racing	(France) Jacques Nicolet (France) Jean-Marc Merlin	Nissan VK45DE 4.5 L V8	D	154
28	LMGTE; Am	61	(Italy) AF Corse	(South Africa) Jack Gerber (Republic of Ireland) Matt Griffin (Italy) Marco Cioci	Ferrari 458 Italia GT2	MI	139
28	LMGTE; Am	61	(Italy) AF Corse	(South Africa) Jack Gerber (Republic of Ireland) Matt Griffin (Italy) Marco Cioci	Ferrari 4.5 L V8	MI	139
NC	LMP2	32	(Czech Republic) Lotus	(Germany) Thomas Holzer (Austria) Dominik Kraihamer (Czech Republic) Jan Charouz	Lotus T128	D	113
NC	LMP2	32	(Czech Republic) Lotus	(Germany) Thomas Holzer (Austria) Dominik Kraihamer (Czech Republic) Jan Charouz	Praga 3.6 L V8	D	113
DNF	LMP1	21	(United Kingdom) Strakka Racing	(United Kingdom) Nick Leventis (United Kingdom) Jonny Kane (United Kingdom) Danny Watts	HPD ARX-03c	MI	55
DNF	LMP1	21	(United Kingdom) Strakka Racing	(United Kingdom) Nick Leventis (United Kingdom) Jonny Kane (United Kingdom) Danny Watts	Honda LM-V8 3.4 L V8	MI	55
DNF	LMP2	31	(Czech Republic) Lotus	(United States) Kevin Weeda (France) Christophe Bouchut (Italy) Vitantonio Liuzzi	Lotus T128	D	44
DNF	LMP2	31	(Czech Republic) Lotus	(United States) Kevin Weeda (France) Christophe Bouchut (Italy) Vitantonio Liuzzi	Praga 3.6 L V8	D	44

FIA World Endurance Championship
Previous race: None	2013 season	Next race: 6 Hours of Spa-Francorchamps
