= 2013 6 Hours of Fuji =

Sports car endurance race held at Fuji Speedway, Oyama, Japan

Fuji Speedway

The 2013 6 Hours of Fuji was an automobile endurance race held at the Fuji Speedway, Oyama, Japan on 20 October 2013. The race was the sixth round of the 2013 FIA World Endurance Championship season. Heavy rains forced race officials to start the race under safety car conditions, completing eight laps before the race was temporarily stopped due to no improvement in track conditions. Following a two-hour delay the race was restarted once more under the safety car, lapping another eight circuits before officials stopped the race again and eventually called an end to the event. The No. 7 Toyota was declared the race winner, gaining the lead following a pit stop under caution from the Audi which started on pole position, while the majority of the field finished in the same position they started the race. Only half points were awarded towards the various championships being held under the WEC umbrella.

As a result of the race, which did not take the green flag, the FIA imposed a rule change effective 2014 where points are only scored if two laps are run under green flag conditions to prevent a repeat of what happened in Fuji.

== Qualifying ==
=== Qualifying result ===
Pole position winners in each class are marked in bold.

Pos	Class	Team	Average Time	Grid
1	**LMP1**	**No. 1 Audi Sport Team Joest**	**1:26.577**	1
2	LMP1	No. 8 Toyota Racing	1:26.755	2
3	LMP1	No. 7 Toyota Racing	1:26.860	3
4	LMP1	No. 2 Audi Sport Team Joest	1:27.425	4
5	LMP1	No. 12 Rebellion Racing	1:29.250	5
6	**LMP2**	**No. 35 OAK Racing**	**1:32.938**	6
7	LMP2	No. 26 G-Drive Racing	1:33.019	7
8	LMP2	No. 27 Gainer International	1:33.073	8
9	LMP2	No. 24 OAK Racing	1:33.097	9
10	LMP2	No. 25 Delta-ADR	1:33.209	10
11	LMP2	No. 47 KCMG	1:33.512	11
12	LMP2	No. 49 Pecom Racing	1:33.525	12
13	LMP2	No. 31 Lotus	1:34.080	13
14	LMP2	No. 32 Lotus	1:34.246	14
15	LMP2	No. 45 OAK Racing	1:35.408	15
16	**LMGTE Pro**	**No. 97 Aston Martin Racing**	**1:39.114**	16
17	LMGTE Pro	No. 99 Aston Martin Racing	1:39.591	17
18	LMGTE Pro	No. 51 AF Corse	1:39.693	18
19	LMGTE Pro	No. 91 Porsche AG Team Manthey	1:39.736	19
20	LMGTE Pro	No. 92 Porsche AG Team Manthey	1:39.778	20
21	**LMGTE Am**	**No. 95 Aston Martin Racing**	**1:40.649**	21
22	LMGTE Am	No. 50 Larbre Compétition	1:40.814	22
23	LMGTE Am	No. 96 Aston Martin Racing	1:40.824	23
24	LMGTE Am	No. 88 Proton Competition	1:41.311	24
25	LMGTE Am	No. 81 8 Star Motorsports	1:41.369	25
26	LMGTE Am	No. 61 AF Corse	1:41.529	26
27	LMGTE Am	No. 57 Krohn Racing	1:41.625	27
28	LMGTE Am	No. 76 IMSA Performance Matmut	1:41.683	28
—	LMGTE Pro	No. 71 AF Corse	No Time	29

== Race ==
=== Race result ===
Class winners in bold. Cars failing to complete 70% of winner's distance marked as Not Classified (NC).

Pos	Class	No	Team	Drivers	Chassis	Tyre	Laps
Pos	Class	No	Team	Drivers	Engine	Tyre	Laps
1	**LMP1**	**7**	**(Japan) Toyota Racing**	**(Austria) Alexander Wurz (France) Nicolas Lapierre (Japan) Kazuki Nakajima**	**Toyota TS030 Hybrid**	MI	**16**
1	**LMP1**	**7**	**(Japan) Toyota Racing**	**(Austria) Alexander Wurz (France) Nicolas Lapierre (Japan) Kazuki Nakajima**	**Toyota 3.4 L V8 (Hybrid)**	MI	**16**
2	LMP1	2	(Germany) Audi Sport Team Joest	(United Kingdom) Allan McNish (Denmark) Tom Kristensen (France) Loïc Duval	Audi R18 e-tron quattro	MI	16
2	LMP1	2	(Germany) Audi Sport Team Joest	(United Kingdom) Allan McNish (Denmark) Tom Kristensen (France) Loïc Duval	Audi TDI 3.7 L Turbo V6 (Hybrid Diesel)	MI	16
3	LMP1	12	(Switzerland) Rebellion Racing	(Italy) Andrea Belicchi (Switzerland) Mathias Beche	Lola B12/60	MI	16
3	LMP1	12	(Switzerland) Rebellion Racing	(Italy) Andrea Belicchi (Switzerland) Mathias Beche	Toyota RV8KLM 3.4 L V8	MI	16
4	**LMP2**	**35**	**(France) OAK Racing**	**(Belgium) Bertrand Baguette (United Kingdom) Martin Plowman (Mexico) Ricardo González**	**Morgan LMP2**	D	**16**
4	**LMP2**	**35**	**(France) OAK Racing**	**(Belgium) Bertrand Baguette (United Kingdom) Martin Plowman (Mexico) Ricardo González**	**Nissan VK45DE 4.5 L V8**	D	**16**
5	LMP2	26	(Russia) G-Drive Racing	(Russia) Roman Rusinov (Australia) John Martin (United Kingdom) Mike Conway	Oreca 03	D	16
5	LMP2	26	(Russia) G-Drive Racing	(Russia) Roman Rusinov (Australia) John Martin (United Kingdom) Mike Conway	Nissan VK45DE 4.5 L V8	D	16
6	LMP2	27	(Japan) Gainer International	(Japan) Katsuyuki Hiranaka (Japan) Masayuki Ueda (Sweden) Björn Wirdheim	Zytek Z11SN	D	16
6	LMP2	27	(Japan) Gainer International	(Japan) Katsuyuki Hiranaka (Japan) Masayuki Ueda (Sweden) Björn Wirdheim	Nissan VK45DE 4.5 L V8	D	16
7	LMP2	24	(France) OAK Racing	(France) Olivier Pla (United Kingdom) Alex Brundle (Denmark) David Heinemeier Hansson	Morgan LMP2	D	16
7	LMP2	24	(France) OAK Racing	(France) Olivier Pla (United Kingdom) Alex Brundle (Denmark) David Heinemeier Hansson	Nissan VK45DE 4.5 L V8	D	16
8	LMP2	25	(United Kingdom) Delta-ADR	(Thailand) Tor Graves (United Kingdom) James Walker (Japan) Shinji Nakano	Oreca 03	D	16
8	LMP2	25	(United Kingdom) Delta-ADR	(Thailand) Tor Graves (United Kingdom) James Walker (Japan) Shinji Nakano	Nissan VK45DE 4.5 L V8	D	16
9	LMP2	47	(Hong Kong) KCMG	(Japan) Hiroshi Koizumi (Japan) Tsugio Matsuda (United Kingdom) Richard Bradley	Morgan LMP2	D	16
9	LMP2	47	(Hong Kong) KCMG	(Japan) Hiroshi Koizumi (Japan) Tsugio Matsuda (United Kingdom) Richard Bradley	Nissan VK45DE 4.5 L V8	D	16
10	LMP2	49	(Argentina) Pecom Racing	(Argentina) Luís Pérez Companc (Germany) Pierre Kaffer (France) Nicolas Minassian	Oreca 03	MI	16
10	LMP2	49	(Argentina) Pecom Racing	(Argentina) Luís Pérez Companc (Germany) Pierre Kaffer (France) Nicolas Minassian	Nissan VK45DE 4.5 L V8	MI	16
11	LMP2	32	(Czech Republic) Lotus	(Germany) Thomas Holzer (Austria) Dominik Kraihamer (Czech Republic) Jan Charouz	Lotus T128	D	16
11	LMP2	32	(Czech Republic) Lotus	(Germany) Thomas Holzer (Austria) Dominik Kraihamer (Czech Republic) Jan Charouz	Praga 3.6 L V8	D	16
12	LMP2	45	(France) OAK Racing	(France) Jacques Nicolet (Japan) Keiko Ihara	Morgan LMP2	D	16
12	LMP2	45	(France) OAK Racing	(France) Jacques Nicolet (Japan) Keiko Ihara	Nissan VK45DE 4.5 L V8	D	16
13	**LMGTE; Pro**	**97**	**(United Kingdom) Aston Martin Racing**	**(United Kingdom) Darren Turner (Germany) Stefan Mücke (France) Frédéric Makowiecki**	**Aston Martin Vantage GTE**	MI	**16**
13	**LMGTE; Pro**	**97**	**(United Kingdom) Aston Martin Racing**	**(United Kingdom) Darren Turner (Germany) Stefan Mücke (France) Frédéric Makowiecki**	**Aston Martin 4.5 L V8**	MI	**16**
14	LMGTE; Pro	51	(Italy) AF Corse	(Italy) Gianmaria Bruni (Italy) Giancarlo Fisichella	Ferrari 458 Italia GT2	MI	16
14	LMGTE; Pro	51	(Italy) AF Corse	(Italy) Gianmaria Bruni (Italy) Giancarlo Fisichella	Ferrari 4.5 L V8	MI	16
15	LMGTE; Pro	91	(Germany) Porsche AG Team Manthey	(Germany) Jörg Bergmeister (France) Patrick Pilet	Porsche 911 RSR	MI	16
15	LMGTE; Pro	91	(Germany) Porsche AG Team Manthey	(Germany) Jörg Bergmeister (France) Patrick Pilet	Porsche 4.0 L Flat-6	MI	16
16	LMGTE; Pro	92	(Germany) Porsche AG Team Manthey	(Germany) Marc Lieb (Austria) Richard Lietz	Porsche 911 RSR	MI	16
16	LMGTE; Pro	92	(Germany) Porsche AG Team Manthey	(Germany) Marc Lieb (Austria) Richard Lietz	Porsche 4.0 L Flat-6	MI	16
17	**LMGTE; Am**	**95**	**(United Kingdom) Aston Martin Racing**	**(Denmark) Kristian Poulsen (Denmark) Christoffer Nygaard (Brazil) Bruno Senna**	**Aston Martin Vantage GTE**	MI	**16**
17	**LMGTE; Am**	**95**	**(United Kingdom) Aston Martin Racing**	**(Denmark) Kristian Poulsen (Denmark) Christoffer Nygaard (Brazil) Bruno Senna**	**Aston Martin 4.5 L V8**	MI	**16**
18	LMGTE; Am	96	(United Kingdom) Aston Martin Racing	(United Kingdom) Jamie Campbell-Walter (United Kingdom) Stuart Hall (United Kingdom) Jonathan Adam	Aston Martin Vantage GTE	MI	16
18	LMGTE; Am	96	(United Kingdom) Aston Martin Racing	(United Kingdom) Jamie Campbell-Walter (United Kingdom) Stuart Hall (United Kingdom) Jonathan Adam	Aston Martin 4.5 L V8	MI	16
19	LMGTE; Am	88	(Germany) Proton Competition	(Germany) Christian Ried (Italy) Gianluca Roda (Italy) Paolo Ruberti	Porsche 997 GT3-RSR	MI	16
19	LMGTE; Am	88	(Germany) Proton Competition	(Germany) Christian Ried (Italy) Gianluca Roda (Italy) Paolo Ruberti	Porsche 4.0 L Flat-6	MI	16
20	LMGTE; Am	81	(United States) 8 Star Motorsports	(Venezuela) Enzo Potolicchio (Portugal) Rui Águas (Italy) Davide Rigon	Ferrari 458 Italia GT2	MI	16
20	LMGTE; Am	81	(United States) 8 Star Motorsports	(Venezuela) Enzo Potolicchio (Portugal) Rui Águas (Italy) Davide Rigon	Ferrari 4.5 L V8	MI	16
21	LMGTE; Pro	71	(Italy) AF Corse	(Japan) Kamui Kobayashi (Finland) Toni Vilander	Ferrari 458 Italia GT2	MI	16
21	LMGTE; Pro	71	(Italy) AF Corse	(Japan) Kamui Kobayashi (Finland) Toni Vilander	Ferrari 4.5 L V8	MI	16
22	LMGTE; Am	76	(France) IMSA Performance Matmut	(France) Raymond Narac (France) Jean-Karl Vernay (Finland) Markus Palttala	Porsche 997 GT3-RSR	MI	16
22	LMGTE; Am	76	(France) IMSA Performance Matmut	(France) Raymond Narac (France) Jean-Karl Vernay (Finland) Markus Palttala	Porsche 4.0 L Flat-6	MI	16
23	LMP2	31	(Czech Republic) Lotus	(United States) Kevin Weeda (United Kingdom) James Rossiter (Italy) Vitantonio Liuzzi	Lotus T128	D	16
23	LMP2	31	(Czech Republic) Lotus	(United States) Kevin Weeda (United Kingdom) James Rossiter (Italy) Vitantonio Liuzzi	Praga 3.6 L V8	D	16
24	LMGTE; Am	57	(United States) Krohn Racing	(United States) Tracy Krohn (Sweden) Niclas Jönsson (Italy) Maurizio Mediani	Ferrari 458 Italia GT2	MI	16
24	LMGTE; Am	57	(United States) Krohn Racing	(United States) Tracy Krohn (Sweden) Niclas Jönsson (Italy) Maurizio Mediani	Ferrari 4.5 L V8	MI	16
25	LMGTE; Am	61	(Italy) AF Corse	(South Africa) Jack Gerber (Republic of Ireland) Matt Griffin (Italy) Marco Cioci	Ferrari 458 Italia GT2	MI	16
25	LMGTE; Am	61	(Italy) AF Corse	(South Africa) Jack Gerber (Republic of Ireland) Matt Griffin (Italy) Marco Cioci	Ferrari 4.5 L V8	MI	16
26	LMP1	1	(Germany) Audi Sport Team Joest	(Germany) André Lotterer (Switzerland) Marcel Fässler (France) Benoît Tréluyer	Audi R18 e-tron quattro	MI	16
26	LMP1	1	(Germany) Audi Sport Team Joest	(Germany) André Lotterer (Switzerland) Marcel Fässler (France) Benoît Tréluyer	Audi TDI 3.7 L Turbo V6 (Hybrid Diesel)	MI	16
27	LMP1	8	(Japan) Toyota Racing	(United Kingdom) Anthony Davidson (Switzerland) Sébastien Buemi (France) Stéphane Sarrazin	Toyota TS030 Hybrid	MI	15
27	LMP1	8	(Japan) Toyota Racing	(United Kingdom) Anthony Davidson (Switzerland) Sébastien Buemi (France) Stéphane Sarrazin	Toyota 3.4 L V8 (Hybrid)	MI	15
28	LMGTE; Pro	99	(United Kingdom) Aston Martin Racing	(Portugal) Pedro Lamy (New Zealand) Richie Stanaway	Aston Martin Vantage GTE	MI	15
28	LMGTE; Pro	99	(United Kingdom) Aston Martin Racing	(Portugal) Pedro Lamy (New Zealand) Richie Stanaway	Aston Martin 4.5 L V8	MI	15
29	LMGTE; Am	50	(France) Larbre Compétition	(France) Julien Canal (France) Patrick Bornhauser (Brazil) Fernando Rees	Chevrolet Corvette C6.R	MI	14
29	LMGTE; Am	50	(France) Larbre Compétition	(France) Julien Canal (France) Patrick Bornhauser (Brazil) Fernando Rees	Chevrolet 5.5 L V8	MI	14

FIA World Endurance Championship
Previous race: 6 Hours of Circuit of the Americas	2013 season	Next race: 6 Hours of Shanghai
