= 2013 6 Hours of São Paulo =

Sports car endurance race held at Autódromo José Carlos Pace, São Paulo

Coordinates: 23°42′13″S 46°41′59″W

(Brazil) 2013 6 Hours of São Paulo
Event information
- Round 4 of 8 in the 2013 FIA World Endurance Championship
- Date: 1 September 2013
- Location: São Paulo
- Venue: Autódromo José Carlos Pace
- Duration: 6 Hours

Results
- Laps completed: 235
- Distance (km): 1012.615
- Distance (miles): 629.095
- LMP1

Pole position
- Time: 1:21.303
- Team: (Germany) Audi Sport Team Joest

Winners
- Team: (Germany) Audi Sport Team Joest
- Drivers: (Germany) André Lotterer (Switzerland) Marcel Fässler (France) Benoît Tréluyer
- LMP2

Winners
- Team: (Russia) G-Drive Racing
- Drivers: (Russia) Roman Rusinov (Australia) John Martin (United Kingdom) Mike Conway
- LMGTE Pro

Winners
- Team: (Italy) AF Corse
- Drivers: (Italy) Gianmaria Bruni (Italy) Giancarlo Fisichella
- LMGTE Am

Winners
- Team: (United Kingdom) Aston Martin Racing
- Drivers: (United Kingdom) Jamie Campbell-Walter (United Kingdom) Stuart Hall

The 2013 6 Hours of São Paulo was an endurance auto race held at the Autódromo José Carlos Pace, São Paulo, Brazil on 30 August – 1 September 2013. The race was the fourth round of the 2013 FIA World Endurance Championship and the second consecutive running of the 6 Hours of São Paulo. Audi continued their streak of four overall victories following an accident for the sole Toyota in LMP1, with André Lotterer, Marcel Fässler, and Benoît Tréluyer leading the Joest Racing duo to the checkered flag. G-Drive Racing earned their first victory in the LMP2 category ahead of OAK Racing, while AF Corse Ferrari led home Aston Martin Racing in the LMGTE Pro class by a gap of less than two seconds. Aston Martin however prevailed in LMGTE Am, ahead of the 8 Star Ferrari.

== Qualifying result ==
Pole position winners in each class are marked in bold.

Pos	Class	Team	Average Time	Grid
1	**LMP1**	**No. 1 Audi Sport Team Joest**	**1:21.303**	1
2	LMP1	No. 2 Audi Sport Team Joest	1:21.353	2
3	LMP1	No. 8 Toyota Racing	1:21.580	3
4	LMP1	No. 12 Rebellion Racing	1:23.623	4
5	**LMP2**	**No. 26 G-Drive Racing**	**1:27.355**	5
6	LMP2	No. 49 Pecom Racing	1:27.830	6
7	LMP2	No. 35 OAK Racing	1:28.300	7
8	LMP2	No. 41 Greaves Motorsport	1:28.318	8
9	LMP2	No. 32 Lotus	1:28.556	9
10	LMP2	No. 24 OAK Racing	1:28.577	10
11	LMP2	No. 31 Lotus	1:30.169	11
12	LMP2	No. 45 OAK Racing	1:30.877	12
13	**LMGTE Pro**	**No. 98 Aston Martin Racing**	**1:33.340**	14
14	LMGTE Pro	No. 92 Porsche AG Team Manthey	1:33.461	15
15	LMGTE Pro	No. 97 Aston Martin Racing	1:33.483	16
16	LMGTE Pro	No. 71 AF Corse	1:33.568	17
17	LMGTE Pro	No. 51 AF Corse	1:33.584	18
18	LMGTE Pro	No. 99 Aston Martin Racing	1:33.818	19
19	LMGTE Pro	No. 91 Porsche AG Team Manthey	1:34.027	20
20	LMGTE Am	No. 61 AF Corse	1:34.577	28^{1}
21	**LMGTE Am**	**No. 95 Aston Martin Racing**	**1:34.585**	21
22	LMGTE Am	No. 81 8 Star Motorsports	1:34.616	22
23	LMGTE Am	No. 96 Aston Martin Racing	1:34.773	23
24	LMGTE Am	No. 88 Proton Competition	1:35.027	24
25	LMGTE Am	No. 57 Krohn Racing	1:35.125	26^{2}
26	LMGTE Am	No. 76 IMSA Performance Matmut	1:35.297	27^{2}
27	LMGTE Am	No. 50 Larbre Compétition	1:35.368	25
–	LMP2	No. 25 Delta-ADR	No Time	20^{3}

- **^1** The No. 61 AF Corse Ferrari was deemed to be below the minimum ride height in post-qualifying scrutineering. The car was penalized to the back of the starting grid.
- **^2** The No. 57 Krohn Ferrari and No. 76 IMSA Porsche both had drivers who failed to meet the minimum lap time requirements. Both cars were penalized to the back of the starting grid.
- **^3** Although the No. 25 Delta-ADR Oreca-Nissan failed to set a qualifying time, the car was allowed to start from the back of the LMP2 field on the grid for safety reasons.

== Race result ==
Class winners in bold. Cars failing to complete 70% of winner's distance marked as Not Classified (NC).

Pos	Class	No	Team	Drivers	Chassis	Tyre	Laps
Pos	Class	No	Team	Drivers	Engine	Tyre	Laps
1	**LMP1**	**1**	**(Germany) Audi Sport Team Joest**	**(Germany) André Lotterer (Switzerland) Marcel Fässler (France) Benoît Tréluyer**	**Audi R18 e-tron quattro**	MI	**235**
1	**LMP1**	**1**	**(Germany) Audi Sport Team Joest**	**(Germany) André Lotterer (Switzerland) Marcel Fässler (France) Benoît Tréluyer**	**Audi TDI 3.7 L Turbo V6 (Hybrid Diesel)**	MI	**235**
2	LMP1	2	(Germany) Audi Sport Team Joest	(United Kingdom) Allan McNish (Denmark) Tom Kristensen (France) Loïc Duval	Audi R18 e-tron quattro	MI	232
2	LMP1	2	(Germany) Audi Sport Team Joest	(United Kingdom) Allan McNish (Denmark) Tom Kristensen (France) Loïc Duval	Audi TDI 3.7 L Turbo V6 (Hybrid Diesel)	MI	232
3	LMP1	12	(Switzerland) Rebellion Racing	(France) Nicolas Prost (Germany) Nick Heidfeld (Switzerland) Mathias Beche	Lola B12/60	MI	230
3	LMP1	12	(Switzerland) Rebellion Racing	(France) Nicolas Prost (Germany) Nick Heidfeld (Switzerland) Mathias Beche	Toyota RV8KLM 3.4 L V8	MI	230
4	**LMP2**	**26**	**(Russia) G-Drive Racing**	**(Russia) Roman Rusinov (Australia) John Martin (United Kingdom) Mike Conway**	**Oreca 03**	D	**222**
4	**LMP2**	**26**	**(Russia) G-Drive Racing**	**(Russia) Roman Rusinov (Australia) John Martin (United Kingdom) Mike Conway**	**Nissan VK45DE 4.5 L V8**	D	**222**
5	LMP2	35	(France) OAK Racing	(Belgium) Bertrand Baguette (United Kingdom) Martin Plowman (Mexico) Ricardo González	Morgan LMP2	D	221
5	LMP2	35	(France) OAK Racing	(Belgium) Bertrand Baguette (United Kingdom) Martin Plowman (Mexico) Ricardo González	Nissan VK45DE 4.5 L V8	D	221
6	LMP2	49	(Argentina) Pecom Racing	(Argentina) Luís Pérez Companc (Germany) Pierre Kaffer (France) Nicolas Minassian	Oreca 03	MI	221
6	LMP2	49	(Argentina) Pecom Racing	(Argentina) Luís Pérez Companc (Germany) Pierre Kaffer (France) Nicolas Minassian	Nissan VK45DE 4.5 L V8	MI	221
7	LMP2	41	(United Kingdom) Greaves Motorsport	(Germany) Christian Zugel (United States) Gunnar Jeannette (Sweden) Björn Wirdheim	Zytek Z11SN	D	217
7	LMP2	41	(United Kingdom) Greaves Motorsport	(Germany) Christian Zugel (United States) Gunnar Jeannette (Sweden) Björn Wirdheim	Nissan VK45DE 4.5 L V8	D	217
8	LMP2	45	(France) OAK Racing	(France) Jacques Nicolet (France) Jean-Marc Merlin (Japan) Keiko Ihara	Morgan LMP2	D	214
8	LMP2	45	(France) OAK Racing	(France) Jacques Nicolet (France) Jean-Marc Merlin (Japan) Keiko Ihara	Nissan VK45DE 4.5 L V8	D	214
9	**LMGTE; Pro**	**51**	**(Italy) AF Corse**	**(Italy) Gianmaria Bruni (Italy) Giancarlo Fisichella**	**Ferrari 458 Italia GT2**	MI	**212**
9	**LMGTE; Pro**	**51**	**(Italy) AF Corse**	**(Italy) Gianmaria Bruni (Italy) Giancarlo Fisichella**	**Ferrari 4.5 L V8**	MI	**212**
10	LMGTE; Pro	97	(United Kingdom) Aston Martin Racing	(United Kingdom) Darren Turner (Germany) Stefan Mücke	Aston Martin Vantage GTE	MI	212
10	LMGTE; Pro	97	(United Kingdom) Aston Martin Racing	(United Kingdom) Darren Turner (Germany) Stefan Mücke	Aston Martin 4.5 L V8	MI	212
11	LMP2	24	(France) OAK Racing	(France) Olivier Pla (United Kingdom) Alex Brundle (Denmark) David Heinemeier Hansson	Morgan LMP2	D	212
11	LMP2	24	(France) OAK Racing	(France) Olivier Pla (United Kingdom) Alex Brundle (Denmark) David Heinemeier Hansson	Nissan VK45DE 4.5 L V8	D	212
12	LMGTE; Pro	91	(Germany) Porsche AG Team Manthey	(Germany) Jörg Bergmeister (France) Patrick Pilet	Porsche 911 RSR	MI	210
12	LMGTE; Pro	91	(Germany) Porsche AG Team Manthey	(Germany) Jörg Bergmeister (France) Patrick Pilet	Porsche 4.0 L Flat-6	MI	210
13	LMGTE; Pro	92	(Germany) Porsche AG Team Manthey	(Germany) Marc Lieb (Austria) Richard Lietz	Porsche 911 RSR	MI	209
13	LMGTE; Pro	92	(Germany) Porsche AG Team Manthey	(Germany) Marc Lieb (Austria) Richard Lietz	Porsche 4.0 L Flat-6	MI	209
14	**LMGTE; Am**	**96**	**(United Kingdom) Aston Martin Racing**	**(United Kingdom) Jamie Campbell-Walter (United Kingdom) Stuart Hall**	**Aston Martin Vantage GTE**	MI	**208**
14	**LMGTE; Am**	**96**	**(United Kingdom) Aston Martin Racing**	**(United Kingdom) Jamie Campbell-Walter (United Kingdom) Stuart Hall**	**Aston Martin 4.5 L V8**	MI	**208**
15	LMGTE; Am	81	(United States) 8 Star Motorsports	(Venezuela) Enzo Potolicchio (Portugal) Rui Águas (Italy) Davide Rigon	Ferrari 458 Italia GT2	MI	208
15	LMGTE; Am	81	(United States) 8 Star Motorsports	(Venezuela) Enzo Potolicchio (Portugal) Rui Águas (Italy) Davide Rigon	Ferrari 4.5 L V8	MI	208
16	LMGTE; Am	88	(Germany) Proton Competition	(Germany) Christian Ried (Italy) Gianluca Roda (Italy) Paolo Ruberti	Porsche 997 GT3-RSR	MI	207
16	LMGTE; Am	88	(Germany) Proton Competition	(Germany) Christian Ried (Italy) Gianluca Roda (Italy) Paolo Ruberti	Porsche 4.0 L Flat-6	MI	207
17	LMGTE; Am	76	(France) IMSA Performance Matmut	(France) Raymond Narac (France) Christophe Bourret (France) Jean-Karl Vernay	Porsche 997 GT3-RSR	MI	207
17	LMGTE; Am	76	(France) IMSA Performance Matmut	(France) Raymond Narac (France) Christophe Bourret (France) Jean-Karl Vernay	Porsche 4.0 L Flat-6	MI	207
18	LMGTE; Am	57	(United States) Krohn Racing	(United States) Tracy Krohn (Sweden) Niclas Jönsson (Italy) Maurizio Mediani	Ferrari 458 Italia GT2	MI	203
18	LMGTE; Am	57	(United States) Krohn Racing	(United States) Tracy Krohn (Sweden) Niclas Jönsson (Italy) Maurizio Mediani	Ferrari 4.5 L V8	MI	203
19	LMGTE; Am	50	(France) Larbre Compétition	(France) Julien Canal (France) Patrick Bornhauser (Brazil) Fernando Rees	Chevrolet Corvette C6.R	MI	194
19	LMGTE; Am	50	(France) Larbre Compétition	(France) Julien Canal (France) Patrick Bornhauser (Brazil) Fernando Rees	Chevrolet 5.5 L V8	MI	194
20	LMGTE; Pro	98	(United Kingdom) Aston Martin Racing	(Canada) Paul Dalla Lana (Portugal) Pedro Lamy (New Zealand) Richie Stanaway	Aston Martin Vantage GTE	MI	186
20	LMGTE; Pro	98	(United Kingdom) Aston Martin Racing	(Canada) Paul Dalla Lana (Portugal) Pedro Lamy (New Zealand) Richie Stanaway	Aston Martin 4.5 L V8	MI	186
DNF	LMGTE; Am	95	(United Kingdom) Aston Martin Racing	(Denmark) Kristian Poulsen (Denmark) Christoffer Nygaard (Denmark) Nicki Thiim	Aston Martin Vantage GTE	MI	162
DNF	LMGTE; Am	95	(United Kingdom) Aston Martin Racing	(Denmark) Kristian Poulsen (Denmark) Christoffer Nygaard (Denmark) Nicki Thiim	Aston Martin 4.5 L V8	MI	162
DNF	LMGTE; Am	61	(Italy) AF Corse	(South Africa) Jack Gerber (Republic of Ireland) Matt Griffin (Italy) Marco Cioci	Ferrari 458 Italia GT2	MI	74
DNF	LMGTE; Am	61	(Italy) AF Corse	(South Africa) Jack Gerber (Republic of Ireland) Matt Griffin (Italy) Marco Cioci	Ferrari 4.5 L V8	MI	74
DNF	LMGTE; Pro	99	(United Kingdom) Aston Martin Racing	(Brazil) Bruno Senna (United Kingdom) Rob Bell	Aston Martin Vantage GTE	MI	61
DNF	LMGTE; Pro	99	(United Kingdom) Aston Martin Racing	(Brazil) Bruno Senna (United Kingdom) Rob Bell	Aston Martin 4.5 L V8	MI	61
DNF	LMP2	25	(United Kingdom) Delta-ADR	(Thailand) Tor Graves (United Kingdom) James Walker (United Kingdom) Robbie Kerr	Oreca 03	D	58
DNF	LMP2	25	(United Kingdom) Delta-ADR	(Thailand) Tor Graves (United Kingdom) James Walker (United Kingdom) Robbie Kerr	Nissan VK45DE 4.5 L V8	D	58
DNF	LMGTE; Pro	71	(Italy) AF Corse	(Japan) Kamui Kobayashi (Finland) Toni Vilander	Ferrari 458 Italia GT2	MI	51
DNF	LMGTE; Pro	71	(Italy) AF Corse	(Japan) Kamui Kobayashi (Finland) Toni Vilander	Ferrari 4.5 L V8	MI	51
DNF	LMP2	31	(Czech Republic) Lotus	(United States) Kevin Weeda (France) Christophe Bouchut	Lotus T128	D	47
DNF	LMP2	31	(Czech Republic) Lotus	(United States) Kevin Weeda (France) Christophe Bouchut	Praga 3.6 L V8	D	47
DNF	LMP1	8	(Japan) Toyota Racing	(United Kingdom) Anthony Davidson (Switzerland) Sébastien Buemi (France) Stéphane Sarrazin	Toyota TS030 Hybrid	MI	25
DNF	LMP1	8	(Japan) Toyota Racing	(United Kingdom) Anthony Davidson (Switzerland) Sébastien Buemi (France) Stéphane Sarrazin	Toyota 3.4 L V8 (Hybrid)	MI	25
DNF	LMP2	32	(Czech Republic) Lotus	(Germany) Thomas Holzer (Austria) Dominik Kraihamer (Czech Republic) Jan Charouz	Lotus T128	D	23
DNF	LMP2	32	(Czech Republic) Lotus	(Germany) Thomas Holzer (Austria) Dominik Kraihamer (Czech Republic) Jan Charouz	Praga 3.6 L V8	D	23

FIA World Endurance Championship
Previous race: 24 Hours of Le Mans	2013 season	Next race: 6 Hours of Circuit of the Americas
