= 2013 6 Hours of Shanghai =

Sports car endurance race held at Shanghai International Circuit

Shanghai International Circuit

The 2013 6 Hours of Shanghai was an endurance auto race held at the Shanghai International Circuit in Shanghai, China on 9 November 2013. The race was the seventh round of the 2013 FIA World Endurance Championship season.

The race was won by André Lotterer, Benoît Tréluyer and Marcel Fässler of Audi Sport Team Joest. Allan McNish, Tom Kristensen and Loïc Duval won the World Drivers' Championship at the event after finishing in third place.

== Qualifying ==
=== Qualifying result ===
Pole position winners in each class are marked in bold.

Pos	Class	Team	Average Time	Grid
1	**LMP1**	**No. 7 Toyota Racing**	**1:48.013**	1
2	LMP1	No. 1 Audi Sport Team Joest	1:48.102	2
3	LMP1	No. 8 Toyota Racing	1:48.694	3
4	LMP1	No. 2 Audi Sport Team Joest	1:49.173	4
5	LMP1	No. 12 Rebellion Racing	1:51.204	5
6	**LMP2**	**No. 26 G-Drive Racing**	**1:55.423**	6
7	LMP2	No. 24 OAK Racing	1:56.210	7
8	LMP2	No. 41 Greaves Motorsport	1:56.219	8
9	LMP2	No. 35 OAK Racing	1:56.243	9
10	LMP2	No. 25 Delta-ADR	1:56.284	10
11	LMP2	No. 49 Pecom Racing	1:56.971	11
12	LMP2	No. 31 Lotus	1:57.531	12
13	LMP2	No. 32 Lotus	1:57.639	13
14	LMP2	No. 45 OAK Racing	1:59.063	14
15	**LMGTE Pro**	**No. 97 Aston Martin Racing**	**2:04.370**	15
16	LMGTE Pro	No. 99 Aston Martin Racing	2:04.389	16
17	LMGTE Pro	No. 92 Porsche AG Team Manthey	2:04.881	17
18	LMGTE Pro	No. 71 AF Corse	2:04.887	18
19	LMGTE Pro	No. 91 Porsche AG Team Manthey	2:05.049	19
20	LMGTE Pro	No. 51 AF Corse	2:05.222	20
21	**LMGTE Am**	**No. 95 Aston Martin Racing**	**2:05.903**	21
22	LMGTE Am	No. 61 AF Corse	2:05.918	22
23	LMGTE Am	No. 81 8 Star Motorsports	2:06.150	23
24	LMGTE Am	No. 88 Proton Competition	2:06.416	24
25	LMGTE Am	No. 76 IMSA Performance Matmut	2:06.738	25
26	LMGTE Am	No. 96 Aston Martin Racing	2:06.943	26
27	LMGTE Am	No. 57 Krohn Racing	2:07.584	27
28	LMGTE Am	No. 50 Larbre Compétition	2:07.669	28

== Race ==
=== Race result ===
Class winners in bold. Cars failing to complete 70% of winner's distance marked as Not Classified (NC).

Pos	Class	No	Team	Drivers	Chassis	Tyre	Laps
Pos	Class	No	Team	Drivers	Engine	Tyre	Laps
1	**LMP1**	**1**	**(Germany) Audi Sport Team Joest**	**(Germany) André Lotterer (Switzerland) Marcel Fässler (France) Benoît Tréluyer**	**Audi R18 e-tron quattro**	MI	**190**
1	**LMP1**	**1**	**(Germany) Audi Sport Team Joest**	**(Germany) André Lotterer (Switzerland) Marcel Fässler (France) Benoît Tréluyer**	**Audi TDI 3.7 L Turbo V6 (Hybrid Diesel)**	MI	**190**
2	LMP1	7	(Japan) Toyota Racing	(Austria) Alexander Wurz (France) Nicolas Lapierre	Toyota TS030 Hybrid	MI	190
2	LMP1	7	(Japan) Toyota Racing	(Austria) Alexander Wurz (France) Nicolas Lapierre	Toyota 3.4 L V8 (Hybrid)	MI	190
3	LMP1	2	(Germany) Audi Sport Team Joest	(United Kingdom) Allan McNish (Denmark) Tom Kristensen (France) Loïc Duval	Audi R18 e-tron quattro	MI	189
3	LMP1	2	(Germany) Audi Sport Team Joest	(United Kingdom) Allan McNish (Denmark) Tom Kristensen (France) Loïc Duval	Audi TDI 3.7 L Turbo V6 (Hybrid Diesel)	MI	189
4	LMP1	12	(Switzerland) Rebellion Racing	(Italy) Andrea Belicchi (Switzerland) Mathias Beche (France) Nicolas Prost	Lola B12/60	MI	185
4	LMP1	12	(Switzerland) Rebellion Racing	(Italy) Andrea Belicchi (Switzerland) Mathias Beche (France) Nicolas Prost	Toyota RV8KLM 3.4 L V8	MI	185
5	**LMP2**	**26**	**(Russia) G-Drive Racing**	**(Russia) Roman Rusinov (Australia) John Martin (United Kingdom) Mike Conway**	**Oreca 03**	D	**177**
5	**LMP2**	**26**	**(Russia) G-Drive Racing**	**(Russia) Roman Rusinov (Australia) John Martin (United Kingdom) Mike Conway**	**Nissan VK45DE 4.5 L V8**	D	**177**
6	LMP2	24	(France) OAK Racing	(France) Olivier Pla (United Kingdom) Alex Brundle (Denmark) David Heinemeier Hansson	Morgan LMP2	D	177
6	LMP2	24	(France) OAK Racing	(France) Olivier Pla (United Kingdom) Alex Brundle (Denmark) David Heinemeier Hansson	Nissan VK45DE 4.5 L V8	D	177
7	LMP2	35	(France) OAK Racing	(Belgium) Bertrand Baguette (United Kingdom) Martin Plowman (Mexico) Ricardo González	Morgan LMP2	D	177
7	LMP2	35	(France) OAK Racing	(Belgium) Bertrand Baguette (United Kingdom) Martin Plowman (Mexico) Ricardo González	Nissan VK45DE 4.5 L V8	D	177
8	LMP2	25	(United Kingdom) Delta-ADR	(Thailand) Tor Graves (United Kingdom) Robbie Kerr (United Kingdom) Craig Dolby	Oreca 03	D	176
8	LMP2	25	(United Kingdom) Delta-ADR	(Thailand) Tor Graves (United Kingdom) Robbie Kerr (United Kingdom) Craig Dolby	Nissan VK45DE 4.5 L V8	D	176
9	LMP2	41	(United Kingdom) Greaves Motorsport	(United States) Eric Lux (Russia) Mark Shulzhitskiy (Sweden) Björn Wirdheim	Zytek Z11SN	D	175
9	LMP2	41	(United Kingdom) Greaves Motorsport	(United States) Eric Lux (Russia) Mark Shulzhitskiy (Sweden) Björn Wirdheim	Nissan VK45DE 4.5 L V8	D	175
10	LMP2	45	(France) OAK Racing	(France) Jacques Nicolet (Japan) Keiko Ihara (China) David Cheng	Morgan LMP2	D	172
10	LMP2	45	(France) OAK Racing	(France) Jacques Nicolet (Japan) Keiko Ihara (China) David Cheng	Nissan VK45DE 4.5 L V8	D	172
11	LMP2	32	(Czech Republic) Lotus	(Germany) Thomas Holzer (Austria) Dominik Kraihamer (Czech Republic) Jan Charouz	Lotus T128	D	172
11	LMP2	32	(Czech Republic) Lotus	(Germany) Thomas Holzer (Austria) Dominik Kraihamer (Czech Republic) Jan Charouz	Praga 3.6 L V8	D	172
12	**LMGTE; Pro**	**97**	**(United Kingdom) Aston Martin Racing**	**(United Kingdom) Darren Turner (Germany) Stefan Mücke**	**Aston Martin Vantage GTE**	MI	**169**
12	**LMGTE; Pro**	**97**	**(United Kingdom) Aston Martin Racing**	**(United Kingdom) Darren Turner (Germany) Stefan Mücke**	**Aston Martin 4.5 L V8**	MI	**169**
13	LMGTE; Pro	99	(United Kingdom) Aston Martin Racing	(Portugal) Pedro Lamy (New Zealand) Richie Stanaway (Brazil) Bruno Senna	Aston Martin Vantage GTE	MI	169
13	LMGTE; Pro	99	(United Kingdom) Aston Martin Racing	(Portugal) Pedro Lamy (New Zealand) Richie Stanaway (Brazil) Bruno Senna	Aston Martin 4.5 L V8	MI	169
14	LMGTE; Pro	91	(Germany) Porsche AG Team Manthey	(Germany) Jörg Bergmeister (France) Patrick Pilet	Porsche 911 RSR	MI	168
14	LMGTE; Pro	91	(Germany) Porsche AG Team Manthey	(Germany) Jörg Bergmeister (France) Patrick Pilet	Porsche 4.0 L Flat-6	MI	168
15	LMGTE; Pro	51	(Italy) AF Corse	(Italy) Gianmaria Bruni (Italy) Giancarlo Fisichella	Ferrari 458 Italia GT2	MI	168
15	LMGTE; Pro	51	(Italy) AF Corse	(Italy) Gianmaria Bruni (Italy) Giancarlo Fisichella	Ferrari 4.5 L V8	MI	168
16	LMGTE; Pro	71	(Italy) AF Corse	(Japan) Kamui Kobayashi (Finland) Toni Vilander	Ferrari 458 Italia GT2	MI	167
16	LMGTE; Pro	71	(Italy) AF Corse	(Japan) Kamui Kobayashi (Finland) Toni Vilander	Ferrari 4.5 L V8	MI	167
17	LMGTE; Pro	92	(Germany) Porsche AG Team Manthey	(Germany) Marc Lieb (Austria) Richard Lietz	Porsche 911 RSR	MI	167
17	LMGTE; Pro	92	(Germany) Porsche AG Team Manthey	(Germany) Marc Lieb (Austria) Richard Lietz	Porsche 4.0 L Flat-6	MI	167
18	**LMGTE; Am**	**81**	**(United States) 8 Star Motorsports**	**(Venezuela) Enzo Potolicchio (Portugal) Rui Águas (Italy) Davide Rigon**	**Ferrari 458 Italia GT2**	MI	**166**
18	**LMGTE; Am**	**81**	**(United States) 8 Star Motorsports**	**(Venezuela) Enzo Potolicchio (Portugal) Rui Águas (Italy) Davide Rigon**	**Ferrari 4.5 L V8**	MI	**166**
19	LMGTE; Am	76	(France) IMSA Performance Matmut	(France) Raymond Narac (France) Jean-Karl Vernay (Finland) Markus Palttala	Porsche 997 GT3-RSR	MI	165
19	LMGTE; Am	76	(France) IMSA Performance Matmut	(France) Raymond Narac (France) Jean-Karl Vernay (Finland) Markus Palttala	Porsche 4.0 L Flat-6	MI	165
20	LMGTE; Am	96	(United Kingdom) Aston Martin Racing	(United Kingdom) Jamie Campbell-Walter (United Kingdom) Stuart Hall (United Kingdom) Jonathan Adam	Aston Martin Vantage GTE	MI	165
20	LMGTE; Am	96	(United Kingdom) Aston Martin Racing	(United Kingdom) Jamie Campbell-Walter (United Kingdom) Stuart Hall (United Kingdom) Jonathan Adam	Aston Martin 4.5 L V8	MI	165
21	LMGTE; Am	88	(Germany) Proton Competition	(Germany) Christian Ried (Italy) Gianluca Roda (Italy) Paolo Ruberti	Porsche 997 GT3-RSR	MI	165
21	LMGTE; Am	88	(Germany) Proton Competition	(Germany) Christian Ried (Italy) Gianluca Roda (Italy) Paolo Ruberti	Porsche 4.0 L Flat-6	MI	165
22	LMGTE; Am	50	(France) Larbre Compétition	(France) Julien Canal (France) Patrick Bornhauser (Brazil) Fernando Rees	Chevrolet Corvette C6.R	MI	164
22	LMGTE; Am	50	(France) Larbre Compétition	(France) Julien Canal (France) Patrick Bornhauser (Brazil) Fernando Rees	Chevrolet 5.5 L V8	MI	164
23	LMGTE; Am	61	(Italy) AF Corse	(South Africa) Jack Gerber (Republic of Ireland) Matt Griffin (Italy) Marco Cioci	Ferrari 458 Italia GT2	MI	164
23	LMGTE; Am	61	(Italy) AF Corse	(South Africa) Jack Gerber (Republic of Ireland) Matt Griffin (Italy) Marco Cioci	Ferrari 4.5 L V8	MI	164
DNF	LMP1	8	(Japan) Toyota Racing	(United Kingdom) Anthony Davidson (Switzerland) Sébastien Buemi (France) Stéphane Sarrazin	Toyota TS030 Hybrid	MI	143
DNF	LMP1	8	(Japan) Toyota Racing	(United Kingdom) Anthony Davidson (Switzerland) Sébastien Buemi (France) Stéphane Sarrazin	Toyota 3.4 L V8 (Hybrid)	MI	143
DNF	LMGTE; Am	57	(United States) Krohn Racing	(United States) Tracy Krohn (Sweden) Niclas Jönsson (Italy) Maurizio Mediani	Ferrari 458 Italia GT2	MI	139
DNF	LMGTE; Am	57	(United States) Krohn Racing	(United States) Tracy Krohn (Sweden) Niclas Jönsson (Italy) Maurizio Mediani	Ferrari 4.5 L V8	MI	139
DNF	LMGTE; Am	95	(United Kingdom) Aston Martin Racing	(Denmark) Kristian Poulsen (Denmark) Christoffer Nygaard (Denmark) Nicki Thiim	Aston Martin Vantage GTE	MI	100
DNF	LMGTE; Am	95	(United Kingdom) Aston Martin Racing	(Denmark) Kristian Poulsen (Denmark) Christoffer Nygaard (Denmark) Nicki Thiim	Aston Martin 4.5 L V8	MI	100
DNF	LMP2	31	(Czech Republic) Lotus	(United States) Kevin Weeda (France) Christophe Bouchut (Italy) Vitantonio Liuzzi	Lotus T128	D	93
DNF	LMP2	31	(Czech Republic) Lotus	(United States) Kevin Weeda (France) Christophe Bouchut (Italy) Vitantonio Liuzzi	Praga 3.6 L V8	D	93
DNF	LMP2	49	(Argentina) Pecom Racing	(Argentina) Luís Pérez Companc (Germany) Pierre Kaffer (France) Nicolas Minassian	Oreca 03	MI	56
DNF	LMP2	49	(Argentina) Pecom Racing	(Argentina) Luís Pérez Companc (Germany) Pierre Kaffer (France) Nicolas Minassian	Nissan VK45DE 4.5 L V8	MI	56

FIA World Endurance Championship
Previous race: 6 Hours of Fuji	2013 season	Next race: 6 Hours of Bahrain
