= 2013 6 Hours of Spa-Francorchamps =

Sports car endurance race held at Spa-Francorchamps

The Circuit de Spa-Francorchamps

The 2013 WEC 6 Hours of Spa-Francorchamps was an endurance race held at Circuit de Spa-Francorchamps, Belgium on 3—4 May 2013, and the annual running of the 6 Hours of Spa-Francorchamps. It was the second round of the 2013 FIA World Endurance Championship season. Defending World Champions André Lotterer, Benoît Tréluyer and Marcel Fässler led a clean sweep of the overall race podium for Audi, while Pecom Racing were victorious in the LMP2 category. The No. 51 car of AF Corse won the LMGTE Pro class, and 8 Star Motorsports won in LMGTE Am.

== Qualifying ==
=== Qualifying result ===
Pole position winners in each class are marked in bold.

Pos	Class	Team	Average Time	Grid
1	**LMP1**	**No.1 Audi Sport Team Joest**	**1:59.961**	1
2	LMP1	No.3 Audi Sport Team Joest	2:00.236	2
3	LMP1	No.2 Audi Sport Team Joest	2:00.610	3
4	LMP1	No.7 Toyota Racing	2:00.947	4
5	LMP1	No.8 Toyota Racing	2:01.203	5
6	LMP1	No.12 Rebellion Racing	2:01.482	6
7	LMP1	No.13 Rebellion Racing	2:03.278	7
8	LMP1	No.21 Strakka Racing	2:03.688	8
9	**LMP2**	**No.49 Pecom Racing**	**2:08.540**	9
10	LMP2	No.38 Jota	2:08.762	10
11	LMP2	No.24 OAK Racing	2:08.932	11
12	LMP2	No.35 OAK Racing	2:09.606	12
13	LMP2	No.25 Delta-ADR	2:09.732	13
14	LMP2	No.26 G-Drive Racing	2:09.892	14
15	LMP2	No.31 Lotus	2:10.361	15
16	LMP2	No.32 Lotus	2:12.753	16
17	LMP2	No.45 OAK Racing	2:13.518	17
18	**LMGTE Pro**	**No.98 Aston Martin Racing**	**2:19.811**	18
19	LMGTE Pro	No.51 AF Corse	2:19.853	19
20	LMGTE Pro	No.71 AF Corse	2:20.089	20
21	LMGTE Pro	No.97 Aston Martin Racing	2:20.107	21
22	LMGTE Pro	No.99 Aston Martin Racing	2:20.241	22
23	LMGTE Pro	No.91 Porsche AG Team Manthey	2:20.243	23
24	LMGTE Pro	No.92 Porsche AG Team Manthey	2:20.860	24
25	**LMGTE Am**	**No.95 Aston Martin Racing**	**2:21.265**	25
26	LMGTE Am	No.81 8 Star Motorsports	2:21.295	26
27	LMGTE Am	No.96 Aston Martin Racing	2:21.549	27
28	LMGTE Am	No.50 Larbre Compétition	2:21.745	28
29	LMGTE Am	No.88 Proton Competition	2:22.690	29
30	LMGTE Am	No.61 AF Corse	2:22.825	30
31	LMGTE Am	No.76 IMSA Performance Matmut	2:23.421	31
32	LMGTE Am	No.57 Krohn Racing	2:25.564	32
33	LMGTE Am	No.54 AF Corse	2:27.888	33
–	LMP2	No. 41 Greaves Motorsport	No Time	–^{1}
–	LMP2	No. 28 Gulf Racing Middle East	Did Not Participate	34

- **^1** The No. 41 Greaves Motorsport Zytek-Nissan crashed during the qualifying session, setting no time. The entry was later withdrawn and did not participate in the race.

== Race ==
=== Race result ===
Class winners in bold. Cars failing to complete 70% of winner's distance marked as Not Classified (NC).

Pos	Class	No	Team	Drivers	Chassis	Tyre	Laps
Pos	Class	No	Team	Drivers	Engine	Tyre	Laps
1	**LMP1**	**1**	**(Germany) Audi Sport Team Joest**	**(Germany) André Lotterer (Switzerland) Marcel Fässler (France) Benoît Tréluyer**	**Audi R18 e-tron quattro**	MI	**168**
1	**LMP1**	**1**	**(Germany) Audi Sport Team Joest**	**(Germany) André Lotterer (Switzerland) Marcel Fässler (France) Benoît Tréluyer**	**Audi TDI 3.7 L Turbo V6 (Hybrid Diesel)**	MI	**168**
2	LMP1	2	(Germany) Audi Sport Team Joest	(United Kingdom) Allan McNish (Denmark) Tom Kristensen (France) Loïc Duval	Audi R18 e-tron quattro	MI	168
2	LMP1	2	(Germany) Audi Sport Team Joest	(United Kingdom) Allan McNish (Denmark) Tom Kristensen (France) Loïc Duval	Audi TDI 3.7 L Turbo V6 (Hybrid Diesel)	MI	168
3	LMP1	3	(Germany) Audi Sport Team Joest	(Spain) Marc Gené (Brazil) Lucas di Grassi (United Kingdom) Oliver Jarvis	Audi R18 e-tron quattro	MI	168
3	LMP1	3	(Germany) Audi Sport Team Joest	(Spain) Marc Gené (Brazil) Lucas di Grassi (United Kingdom) Oliver Jarvis	Audi TDI 3.7 L Turbo V6 (Hybrid Diesel)	MI	168
4	LMP1	8	(Japan) Toyota Racing	(United Kingdom) Anthony Davidson (France) Stéphane Sarrazin (Switzerland) Sébastien Buemi	Toyota TS030 Hybrid	MI	167
4	LMP1	8	(Japan) Toyota Racing	(United Kingdom) Anthony Davidson (France) Stéphane Sarrazin (Switzerland) Sébastien Buemi	Toyota 3.4 L V8 (Hybrid)	MI	167
5	LMP1	12	(Switzerland) Rebellion Racing	(France) Nicolas Prost (Switzerland) Neel Jani (Germany) Nick Heidfeld	Lola B12/60	MI	165
5	LMP1	12	(Switzerland) Rebellion Racing	(France) Nicolas Prost (Switzerland) Neel Jani (Germany) Nick Heidfeld	Toyota RV8KLM 3.4 L V8	MI	165
6	LMP1	13	(Switzerland) Rebellion Racing	(Italy) Andrea Belicchi (Switzerland) Mathias Beche (China) Congfu Cheng	Lola B12/60	MI	165
6	LMP1	13	(Switzerland) Rebellion Racing	(Italy) Andrea Belicchi (Switzerland) Mathias Beche (China) Congfu Cheng	Toyota RV8KLM 3.4 L V8	MI	165
7	LMP1	21	(United Kingdom) Strakka Racing	(United Kingdom) Nick Leventis (United Kingdom) Jonny Kane (United Kingdom) Danny Watts	HPD ARX-03c	MI	161
7	LMP1	21	(United Kingdom) Strakka Racing	(United Kingdom) Nick Leventis (United Kingdom) Jonny Kane (United Kingdom) Danny Watts	Honda LM-V8 3.4 L V8	MI	161
8	**LMP2**	**49**	**(Argentina) Pecom Racing**	**(Argentina) Luís Pérez Companc (Germany) Pierre Kaffer (France) Nicolas Minassian**	**Oreca 03**	MI	**157**
8	**LMP2**	**49**	**(Argentina) Pecom Racing**	**(Argentina) Luís Pérez Companc (Germany) Pierre Kaffer (France) Nicolas Minassian**	**Nissan VK45DE 4.5 L V8**	MI	**157**
9	LMP2	24	(France) OAK Racing	(France) Olivier Pla (United Kingdom) Alex Brundle (Denmark) David Heinemeier Hansson	Morgan LMP2	D	157
9	LMP2	24	(France) OAK Racing	(France) Olivier Pla (United Kingdom) Alex Brundle (Denmark) David Heinemeier Hansson	Nissan VK45DE 4.5 L V8	D	157
10	LMP2	38	(United Kingdom) Jota	(United Kingdom) Simon Dolan (United Kingdom) Oliver Turvey (Germany) Lucas Luhr	Zytek Z11SN	D	157
10	LMP2	38	(United Kingdom) Jota	(United Kingdom) Simon Dolan (United Kingdom) Oliver Turvey (Germany) Lucas Luhr	Nissan VK45DE 4.5 L V8	D	157
11	LMP2	35	(France) OAK Racing	(Belgium) Bertrand Baguette (United Kingdom) Martin Plowman (Mexico) Ricardo González	Morgan LMP2	D	156
11	LMP2	35	(France) OAK Racing	(Belgium) Bertrand Baguette (United Kingdom) Martin Plowman (Mexico) Ricardo González	Nissan VK45DE 4.5 L V8	D	156
12	LMP2	26	(Russia) G-Drive Racing	(Russia) Roman Rusinov (Australia) John Martin (United Kingdom) Mike Conway	Oreca 03	D	152
12	LMP2	26	(Russia) G-Drive Racing	(Russia) Roman Rusinov (Australia) John Martin (United Kingdom) Mike Conway	Nissan VK45DE 4.5 L V8	D	152
13	LMP2	45	(France) OAK Racing	(France) Jacques Nicolet (France) Jean-Marc Merlin	Morgan LMP2	D	152
13	LMP2	45	(France) OAK Racing	(France) Jacques Nicolet (France) Jean-Marc Merlin	Nissan VK45DE 4.5 L V8	D	152
14	LMP2	32	(Czech Republic) Lotus	(Germany) Thomas Holzer (Austria) Dominik Kraihamer (Czech Republic) Jan Charouz	Lotus T128	D	152
14	LMP2	32	(Czech Republic) Lotus	(Germany) Thomas Holzer (Austria) Dominik Kraihamer (Czech Republic) Jan Charouz	Praga 3.6 L V8	D	152
15	**LMGTE; Pro**	**51**	**(Italy) AF Corse**	**(Italy) Gianmaria Bruni (Italy) Giancarlo Fisichella**	**Ferrari 458 Italia GT2**	MI	**149**
15	**LMGTE; Pro**	**51**	**(Italy) AF Corse**	**(Italy) Gianmaria Bruni (Italy) Giancarlo Fisichella**	**Ferrari 4.5 L V8**	MI	**149**
16	LMGTE; Pro	98	(United Kingdom) Aston Martin Racing	(Brazil) Bruno Senna (France) Frédéric Makowiecki (United Kingdom) Rob Bell	Aston Martin Vantage GTE	MI	149
16	LMGTE; Pro	98	(United Kingdom) Aston Martin Racing	(Brazil) Bruno Senna (France) Frédéric Makowiecki (United Kingdom) Rob Bell	Aston Martin 4.5 L V8	MI	149
17	LMGTE; Pro	71	(Italy) AF Corse	(Japan) Kamui Kobayashi (Finland) Toni Vilander	Ferrari 458 Italia GT2	MI	149
17	LMGTE; Pro	71	(Italy) AF Corse	(Japan) Kamui Kobayashi (Finland) Toni Vilander	Ferrari 4.5 L V8	MI	149
18	LMGTE; Pro	97	(United Kingdom) Aston Martin Racing	(United Kingdom) Darren Turner (Germany) Stefan Mücke (United Kingdom) Peter Dumbreck	Aston Martin Vantage GTE	MI	148
18	LMGTE; Pro	97	(United Kingdom) Aston Martin Racing	(United Kingdom) Darren Turner (Germany) Stefan Mücke (United Kingdom) Peter Dumbreck	Aston Martin 4.5 L V8	MI	148
19	LMGTE; Pro	92	(Germany) Porsche AG Team Manthey	(Germany) Marc Lieb (Austria) Richard Lietz (France) Romain Dumas	Porsche 911 RSR	MI	148
19	LMGTE; Pro	92	(Germany) Porsche AG Team Manthey	(Germany) Marc Lieb (Austria) Richard Lietz (France) Romain Dumas	Porsche 4.0 L Flat-6	MI	148
20	LMGTE; Pro	99	(United Kingdom) Aston Martin Racing	(Canada) Paul Dalla Lana (Portugal) Pedro Lamy (New Zealand) Richie Stanaway	Aston Martin Vantage GTE	MI	147
20	LMGTE; Pro	99	(United Kingdom) Aston Martin Racing	(Canada) Paul Dalla Lana (Portugal) Pedro Lamy (New Zealand) Richie Stanaway	Aston Martin 4.5 L V8	MI	147
21	**LMGTE; Am**	**81**	**(United States) 8 Star Motorsports**	**(Venezuela) Enzo Potolicchio (Portugal) Rui Águas (Italy) Matteo Malucelli**	**Ferrari 458 Italia GT2**	MI	**147**
21	**LMGTE; Am**	**81**	**(United States) 8 Star Motorsports**	**(Venezuela) Enzo Potolicchio (Portugal) Rui Águas (Italy) Matteo Malucelli**	**Ferrari 4.5 L V8**	MI	**147**
22	LMGTE; Am	95	(United Kingdom) Aston Martin Racing	(Denmark) Allan Simonsen (Denmark) Kristian Poulsen (Denmark) Christoffer Nygaard	Aston Martin Vantage GTE	MI	146
22	LMGTE; Am	95	(United Kingdom) Aston Martin Racing	(Denmark) Allan Simonsen (Denmark) Kristian Poulsen (Denmark) Christoffer Nygaard	Aston Martin 4.5 L V8	MI	146
23	LMGTE; Am	50	(France) Larbre Compétition	(France) Julien Canal (France) Patrick Bornhauser (Brazil) Fernando Rees	Chevrolet Corvette C6.R	MI	145
23	LMGTE; Am	50	(France) Larbre Compétition	(France) Julien Canal (France) Patrick Bornhauser (Brazil) Fernando Rees	Chevrolet 5.5 L V8	MI	145
24	LMP2	31	(Czech Republic) Lotus	(United States) Kevin Weeda (United Kingdom) James Rossiter (Italy) Vitantonio Liuzzi	Lotus T128	D	144
24	LMP2	31	(Czech Republic) Lotus	(United States) Kevin Weeda (United Kingdom) James Rossiter (Italy) Vitantonio Liuzzi	Praga 3.6 L V8	D	144
25	LMGTE; Am	96	(United Kingdom) Aston Martin Racing	(Germany) Roald Goethe (United Kingdom) Jamie Campbell-Walter (United Kingdom) Stuart Hall	Aston Martin Vantage GTE	MI	144
25	LMGTE; Am	96	(United Kingdom) Aston Martin Racing	(Germany) Roald Goethe (United Kingdom) Jamie Campbell-Walter (United Kingdom) Stuart Hall	Aston Martin 4.5 L V8	MI	144
26	LMGTE; Am	88	(Germany) Proton Competition	(Germany) Christian Ried (Italy) Gianluca Roda (Italy) Paolo Ruberti	Porsche 997 GT3-RSR	MI	143
26	LMGTE; Am	88	(Germany) Proton Competition	(Germany) Christian Ried (Italy) Gianluca Roda (Italy) Paolo Ruberti	Porsche 4.0 L Flat-6	MI	143
27	LMGTE; Am	76	(France) IMSA Performance Matmut	(France) Raymond Narac (France) Jean-Karl Vernay	Porsche 997 GT3-RSR	MI	143
27	LMGTE; Am	76	(France) IMSA Performance Matmut	(France) Raymond Narac (France) Jean-Karl Vernay	Porsche 4.0 L Flat-6	MI	143
28	LMGTE; Am	57	(United States) Krohn Racing	(United States) Tracy Krohn (Sweden) Niclas Jönsson (Italy) Maurizio Mediani	Ferrari 458 Italia GT2	MI	142
28	LMGTE; Am	57	(United States) Krohn Racing	(United States) Tracy Krohn (Sweden) Niclas Jönsson (Italy) Maurizio Mediani	Ferrari 4.5 L V8	MI	142
29	LMP2	28	(United Arab Emirates) Gulf Racing Middle East	(France) Fabien Giroix (Ivory Coast) Frédéric Fatien (Japan) Keiko Ihara	Lola B12/80	D	140
29	LMP2	28	(United Arab Emirates) Gulf Racing Middle East	(France) Fabien Giroix (Ivory Coast) Frédéric Fatien (Japan) Keiko Ihara	Nissan VK45DE 4.5 L V8	D	140
30	LMGTE; Am	54	(Italy) AF Corse	(France) Yannick Mallegol (France) Jean-Marc Bachelier (United States) Howard Blank	Ferrari 458 Italia GT2	MI	138
30	LMGTE; Am	54	(Italy) AF Corse	(France) Yannick Mallegol (France) Jean-Marc Bachelier (United States) Howard Blank	Ferrari 4.5 L V8	MI	138
31	LMGTE; Am	61	(Italy) AF Corse	(South Africa) Jack Gerber (Republic of Ireland) Matt Griffin (Italy) Marco Cioci	Ferrari 458 Italia GT2	MI	125
31	LMGTE; Am	61	(Italy) AF Corse	(South Africa) Jack Gerber (Republic of Ireland) Matt Griffin (Italy) Marco Cioci	Ferrari 4.5 L V8	MI	125
DNF	LMGTE; Pro	91	(Germany) Porsche AG Team Manthey	(Germany) Jörg Bergmeister (France) Patrick Pilet (Germany) Timo Bernhard	Porsche 911 RSR	MI	123
DNF	LMGTE; Pro	91	(Germany) Porsche AG Team Manthey	(Germany) Jörg Bergmeister (France) Patrick Pilet (Germany) Timo Bernhard	Porsche 4.0 L Flat-6	MI	123
DNF	LMP1	7	(Japan) Toyota Racing	(Austria) Alexander Wurz (France) Nicolas Lapierre (Japan) Kazuki Nakajima	Toyota TS030 Hybrid	MI	99
DNF	LMP1	7	(Japan) Toyota Racing	(Austria) Alexander Wurz (France) Nicolas Lapierre (Japan) Kazuki Nakajima	Toyota 3.4 L V8 (Hybrid)	MI	99
DNF	LMP2	25	(United Kingdom) Delta-ADR	(Thailand) Tor Graves (Brazil) Antônio Pizzonia (United Kingdom) James Walker	Oreca 03	D	25
DNF	LMP2	25	(United Kingdom) Delta-ADR	(Thailand) Tor Graves (Brazil) Antônio Pizzonia (United Kingdom) James Walker	Nissan VK45DE 4.5 L V8	D	25
WD	LMP2	41	(United Kingdom) Greaves Motorsport	(United Kingdom) Tom Kimber-Smith (United States) Chris Dyson (United States) Michael Marsal	Zytek Z11SN	D	–
WD	LMP2	41	(United Kingdom) Greaves Motorsport	(United Kingdom) Tom Kimber-Smith (United States) Chris Dyson (United States) Michael Marsal	Nissan VK45DE 4.5 L V8	D	–

FIA World Endurance Championship
Previous race: 6 Hours of Silverstone	2013 season	Next race: 24 Hours of Le Mans
