= Thomas Holzer =

German racing driver

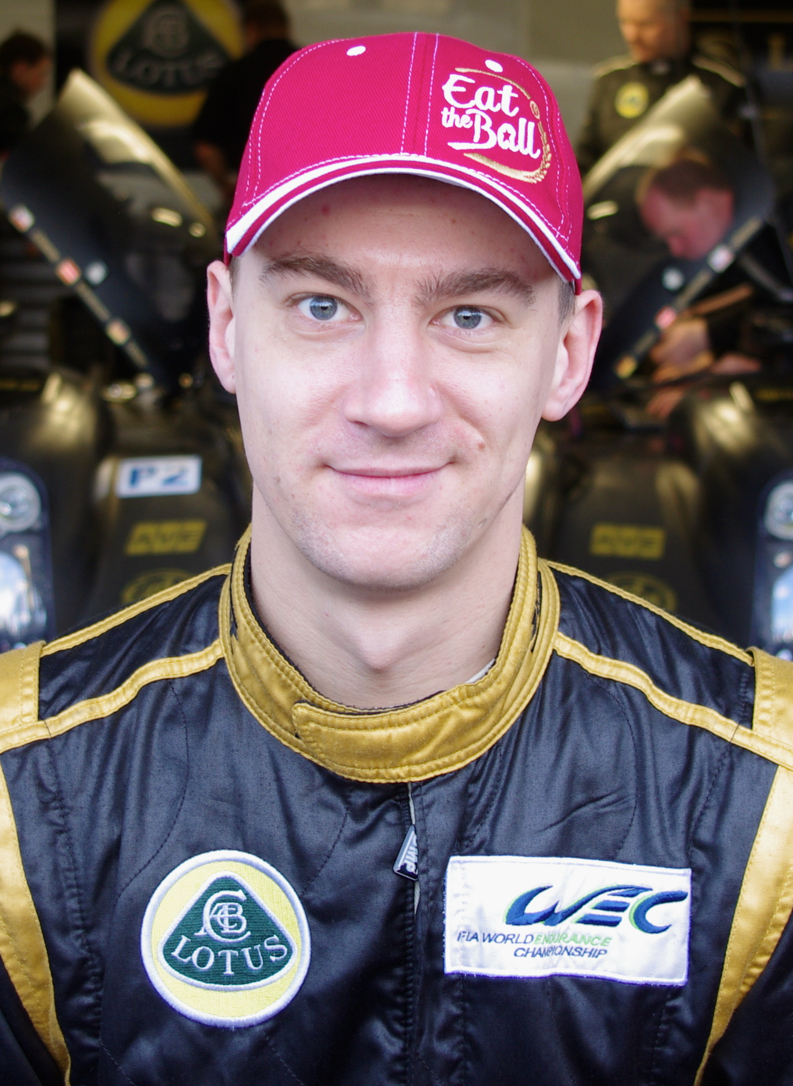
- Holzer at the 2013 6 Hours of Silverstone
- Nationality: (Germany) German
- Born: 27 December 1985 (age 40) Augsburg, Germany

FIA World Endurance Championship career
- Debut season: 2012
- Current team: Lotus
- Categorisation: FIA Silver
- Car number: 32
- Starts: 11
- Wins: 0
- Poles: 0
- Fastest laps: 0
- Best finish: 65th in 2012

Previous series
- 2011 2005 2003–04 2002 2001: ADAC GT Masters; Formula 3 Euro Series; German Formula Three; Formula BMW ADAC; Formula BMW Junior

Thomas Josef Holzer (born 27 December 1985) is a German racing driver.

== Career ==
=== Formula BMW ===
Born in Augsburg, Holzer began his karting career in 1997, before moving into the Formula BMW ADAC championship in 2001, with ADAC e.V. Motorsport. Holzer finished seventh in the championship. He switched teams and went to the main class, joining Mücke Motorsport for 2002 and finished the season on the sixth place with two wins at EuroSpeedway Lausitz.

=== Formula Three ===
Holzer graduated to the Formula 3 class in 2003, joining the German Formula Three Championship and Trella Motorsport. He finished seventh with one podium. He stayed in the series for the next year, but switched to his family team AM-Holzer Rennsport. He improved to fifth place in the standings and won race at EuroSpeedway Lausitz.

In 2005, Holzer moved to the Formula 3 Euro Series. He finished 22nd in the standings without scoring a point.

=== ADAC GT Masters ===
After six-year absence, Holzer returned in racing, participating in local series ADAC GT Masters with Heico Motorsport.

=== FIA World Endurance Championship ===
In 2012, Holzer moved to the endurance racing, joining FIA World Endurance Championship and Lotus. He continued his LMP2 campaign with Lotus-backed Kodewa in 2013.

== Racing record ==
=== Career summary ===
Season	Series	Team	Races	Wins	Poles	F/Laps	Podiums	Points	Position
2001	Formula BMW Junior	ADAC e.V. Motorsport	20	1	0	1	4	131	7th
2002	Formula BMW ADAC	Mücke Motorsport	20	2	1	0	4	130	6th
2003	German Formula Three	Trella Motorsport	10	0	0	0	1	72	7th
2004	German Formula Three	AM-Holzer Rennsport	18	1	1	2	4	121	5th
2005	Formula 3 Euro Series	AM-Holzer Rennsport	20	0	0	0	0	12	22nd
2005	Masters of Formula 3	AM-Holzer Rennsport	1	0	0	0	0	N/A	22nd
2011	ADAC GT Masters	Heico Motorsport	18	0	0	0	0	0	NC
2012	FIA World Endurance Championship	Lotus	8	0	0	0	0	2.5	65th
2012	FIA World Endurance Championship - LMP2	Lotus	8	0	0	0	0	32	8th
2012	24 Hours of Le Mans - LMP2	Lotus	1	0	0	0	0	N/A	NC
2013	FIA World Endurance Championship	Lotus	3	0	0	0	0	0.5*	17th*
2013	FIA World Endurance Championship - LMP2	Lotus	3	0	0	0	0	8*	28th*
2013	24 Hours of Le Mans - LMP2	Lotus	1	0	0	0	0	N/A	NC
2013	European Le Mans Series - LMP2	Boutsen Ginion Racing	1	0	0	0	0	0	NC

^{*} Season still in progress.

=== Complete Formula 3 Euro Series results ===
(key) (Races in bold indicate pole position) (Races in italics indicate fastest lap)

Year	Entrant	Chassis	Engine	1	2	3	4	5	6	7	8	9	10	11	12	13	14	15	16	17	18	19	20	DC	Points
2005	AM-Holzer Rennsport	Dallara FF305/060	Opel	HOC; 1; 11	HOC; 2 Ret	PAU; 1; 18	PAU; 2; 13	SPA; 1 DSQ	SPA; 2; 16	MON; 1 Ret	MON; 2; 14	OSC; 1; 16	OSC; 2; 20	NOR; 1; 13	NOR; 2; 17	NÜR; 1; 19	NÜR; 2; 15	ZAN; 1; 11	ZAN; 2; 13	LAU; 1; 11	LAU; 2; 16	HOC; 3 Ret	HOC; 4; 15	22nd	0

=== Complete FIA World Endurance Championship results ===
Year	Entrant	Class	Chassis	Engine	1	2	3	4	5	6	7	8	Rank	Points
2012	Lotus	LMP2	Lola B12/80	Lotus 3.6 L V8	SEB; 6	SPA; Ret	LMS; Ret	SIL; 6	SÃO; 8	BHR; Ret	FUJ; Ret	SHA; 6	8th	32
2013	Lotus	LMP2	Lotus T128	Praga Judd 3.6 L V8	SIL; NC	SPA; 6	LMS; Ret	SÃO; Ret	COA	FUJ	SHA	BHR	32nd*	8*

=== 24 Hours of Le Mans results ===
Year	Team	Co-Drivers	Car	Class	Laps	Pos.	Class Pos.
2012	(Germany) Lotus	(Germany) Mirco Schultis (Italy) Luca Moro	Lola B08/80-Lotus (Judd)	LMP2	155	DNF	DNF
2013	(Czech Republic) Lotus	(Czech Republic) Jan Charouz (Austria) Dominik Kraihamer	Lotus T128-Praga (Judd)	LMP2	219	DNF	DNF
