= Lotus T128 (Le Mans Prototype) =

Endurance racing car

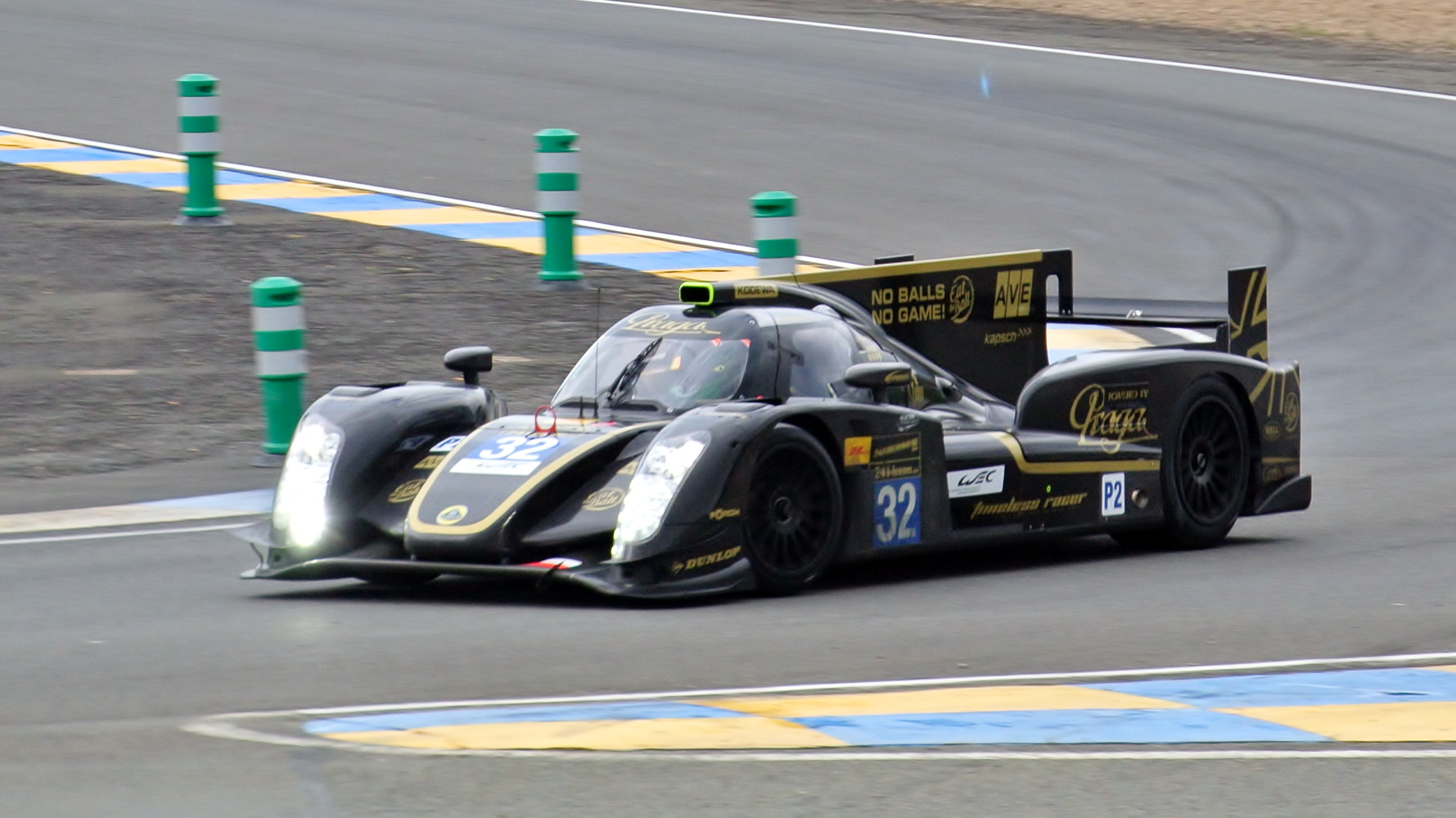
- Lotus T128 at the 2013 24 Hours of Le Mans
- Category: Le Mans Prototype 2 (LMP2)
- Constructor: Lotus (Adess AG and Kodewa)
- Designer: James Key

Technical specifications
- Chassis: Carbon fibre honeycomb monocoque
- Suspension (front): Independent double wishbone pushrod system
- Suspension (rear): Independent double wishbone pushrod system
- Width: 1,997 mm (78.6 in)
- Engine: Praga 3.6 L (3,600 cc) 90-degree V8 Normally aspirated mid, longitudinally mounted
- Transmission: Hewland TLSN 200 6-speed sequential manual Viscous mechanical locking differential
- Fuel: petrol
- Tires: Dunlop radial

Competition history
- Notable entrants: Lotus
- Notable drivers: Kevin Weeda; James Rossiter; Vitantonio Liuzzi; Thomas Holzer
- Debut: 2013 6 Hours of Silverstone
- Last event: 2013 6 Hours of Bahrain
Races	Wins	Poles	F/Laps
8	0	0	0
- Constructors' Championships: 0
- Drivers' Championships: 0

The Lotus T128 is a Le Mans Prototype 2 (LMP2) designed by former Sauber technical director James Key and built by Advanced Design and Engineering Systems Solutions (ADESS) and Kodewa. It was used by Kodewa in the 2013 FIA World Endurance Championship under the name Lotus. Stéphane Chosse, the founder of ADESS, first proposed building a Le Mans prototype car in March 2011. The vehicle's construction began in February 2013, eleven months after Kodewa acquired two chassis. The T128's aerodynamic study was carried out using a computer-aided software mesh tool from Altair Engineering, and aerodynamics was the main priority in its design, with Chosse taking a similar approach as when he was involved in Formula One. It uses a naturally aspirated V8 engine from the BMW S65, which is also used in the company's M3 model, and produces around 450 horsepower (340 kW).

The programme was officially announced during the 2012 24 Hours of Le Mans race weekend, and its scheduled first test in December was delayed by seven weeks to allow for the installation of additional parts. Both cars failed to finish the season-opening 2013 6 Hours of Silverstone but finished in the top six at Spa-Francorchamps. A legal dispute over unpaid invoices arose during the 24 Hours of Le Mans, resulting in the cars being temporarily seized by bailiffs until a Le Mans court ordered their return after Lotus proved that the invoices were fictitious. Both cars failed to finish the race and the subsequent round in São Paulo. Lotus took their only podium of the season at the 6 Hours of Circuit of the Americas, but finished no higher than sixth in the final three races. The two T128s finished seventh and eighth in the FIA Endurance Trophy for LMP2 Teams. After the season, Lotus moved into LMP1 and replaced the T128s with a new car, the CLM P1/01.

== Development ==
=== Concept ===
In March 2011, Stéphane Chosse, founder of the German-based Advanced Design and Engineering Systems Solutions (ADESS), announced preliminary plans to build a Le Mans Prototype car. A year later, German racing team Kodewa ordered two chassis for the 2013 FIA World Endurance Championship. ADESS and Kodewa developed it in the Bavarian capital of Munich's high-technology park. The T128 was also designed to meet the 2014 Le Mans Prototype 1 (LMP1) regulations, which significantly improved driver safety and visibility. The project was overseen by Kodewa co-founder Romulus Kolles, Lotus F1 Team manager Patrick Louis, Gravity Charouz Racing manager Antonin Charouz, and Petr Ptacek, owner of Czech car manufacturer Praga. Former Sauber technical director James Key assisted them. With Lotus as title sponsor, the Kodewa team adopted the Lotus name. Kodewa planned to sell the T128 to client teams for use in other championships.

=== Design ===
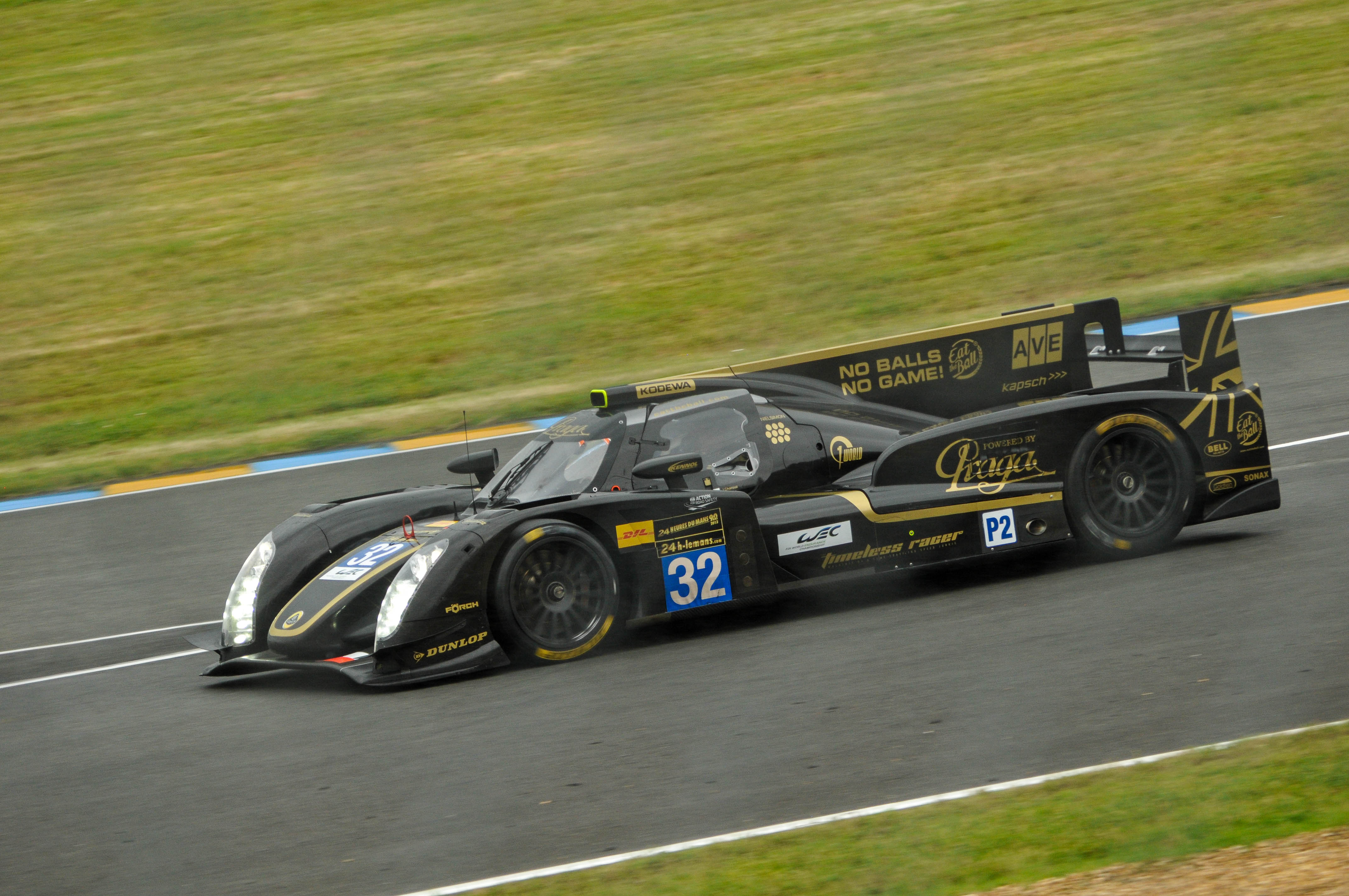
The T128's black and gold livery was designed by automotive futurist Daniel Simon.

Altair Engineering's computer-aided design software was used for the car study. ADESS engineers used the HyperMesh tool to obtain numerical simulations using finite elements. Finally, the use of the Radioss software enabled the simulation of crash tests, which influenced the design of the monohull's front nose. The scale wind tunnel at the Mercedes-Benz Formula One team's Brackley headquarters was used to develop the design's aerodynamics. Choose stated that the car's aerodynamics were the main priority in its design, and he took a similar approach to his years in Formula One. The rollover protection structure is integrated into the carbon fibre reinforced polymer chassis. Automotive futurist Daniel Simon designed the car's black and gold livery. The suspension setup at the front and rear of the vehicle was a double wishbone pushrod actuated torsion bar with dampers housed inside the car's monocoque. It had bodywork elements that directed airflow into the chassis.

Its engine, a naturally aspirated V8 variant of the BMW S65 used in the company's M3 model, was angled at 90 degrees, and rebadged by Praga. For the best efficiency rate, engineers used the S65 production block, reducing its capacity to 3,600 cc (220 cu in). The engine produces 450 hp (340 kW) and a maximum speed of 9,500 revolutions per minute (rpm). When the driver reaches 7,000 rpm, the engine produces 405 NM of torque. Hewland Transmissions custom-designed and installed a six-speed sequential gearbox onto the car's engine. A single intake was mounted on the car's roof to allow airflow into it. The Brembo brake discs were made of carbon ceramic materials and also features power steering. The T128 monocoque began production in February 2013, and it was homologated a month later. After the car's launch, Igor Zamorano of Motorpasión wrote of his feeling that its front resembled the Audi R18.

=== Preparation and drivers ===
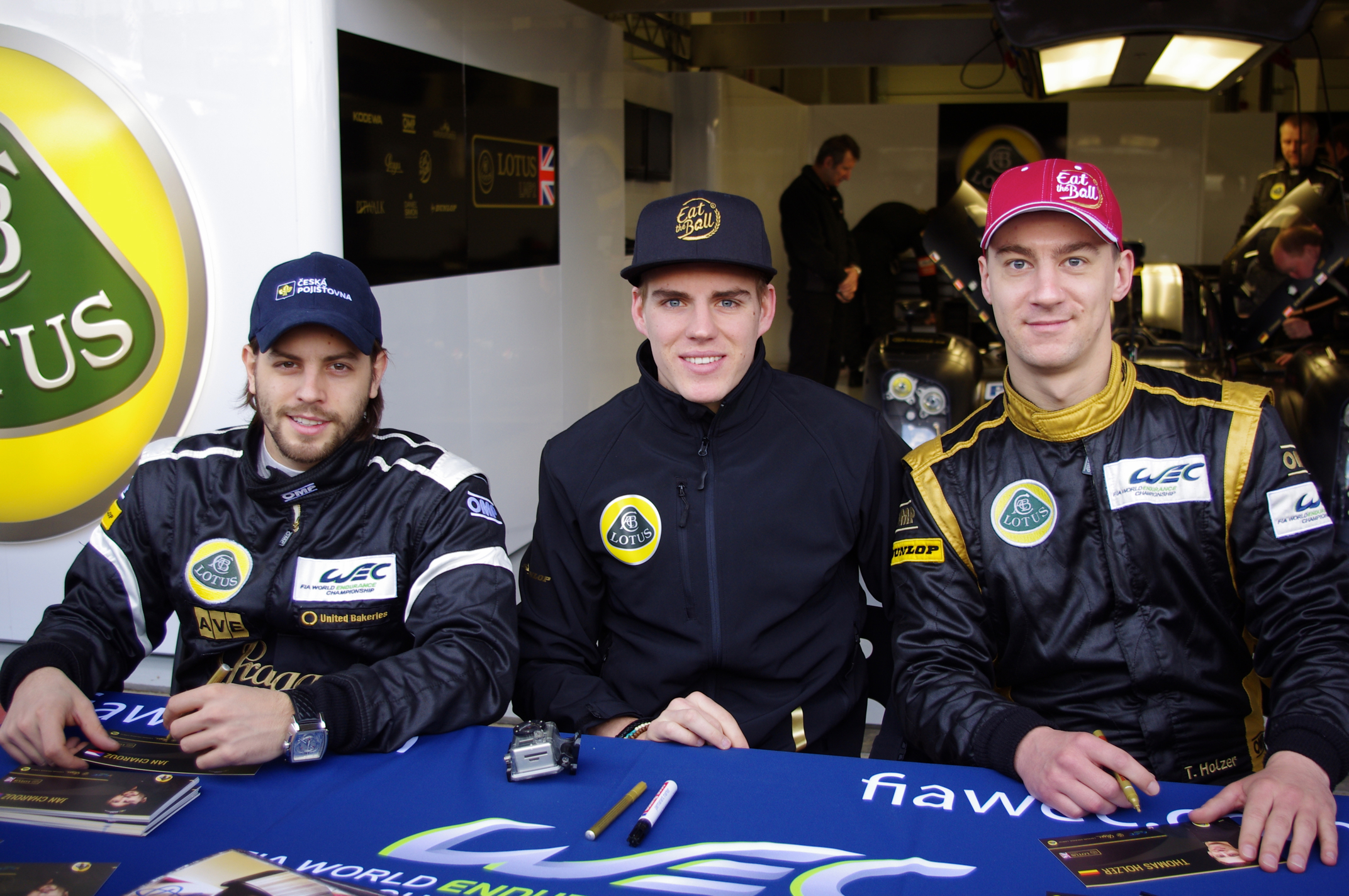
Jan Charouz, Dominik Kraihamer and Thomas Holzer were selected to drive the No. 32 car by Lotus.

During the 2012 24 Hours of Le Mans weekend, Lotus publicly announced its T128 programme. The first picture of the car was made public on 1 August. Lotus planned to test the T128 in the first week of December 2012, but due to late part fitting, those plans were postponed to the third week of January 2013. That month, the team announced their intention to compete in the World Endurance Championship. Lotus also confirmed the return of Thomas Holzer and Kevin Weeda from the previous season. Less than a month later, the team re-signed James Rossiter and Vitantonio Liuzzi to drive one of the two T128s alongside Weeda. Lotus entered just one T128 for the pre-season test session at the Circuit Paul Ricard on March 28. Christophe Bouchut would share the No. 31 car with Liuzzi and Rossiter, and Dominik Kraihamer would share the No. 32 car with Weeda and 2009 Le Mans Series LMP1 champion Jan Charouz. During the various sessions, a ruptured oil tank limited the sole car's running for several hours before a replacement arrived and Rossiter drove some installation laps.

== Racing history ==
=== Season-opening European leg ===
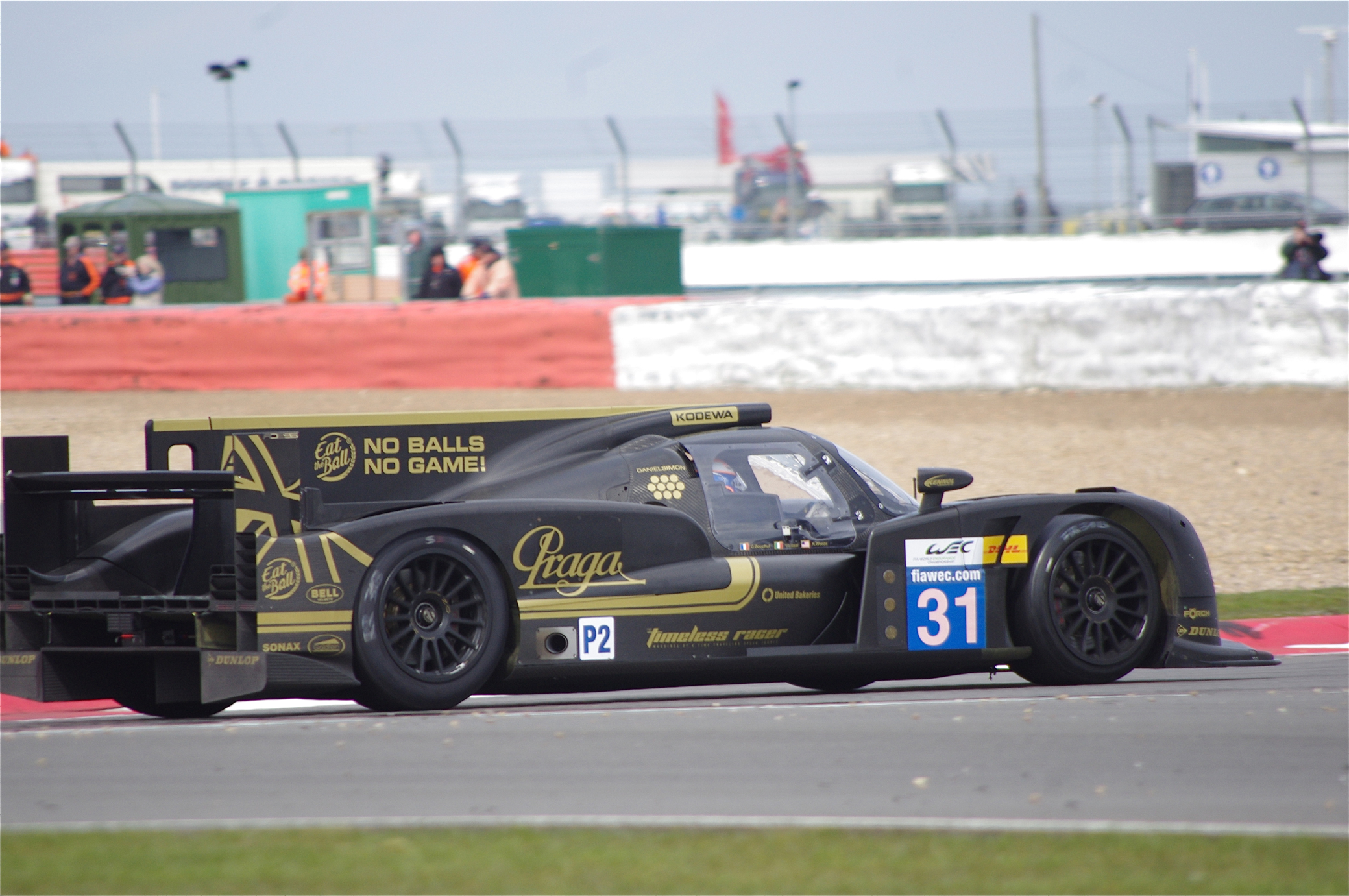
The No. 31 Lotus T128 being driven at the 6 Hours of Silverstone.

Lotus were expected to bring two T128s to the season-opening 6 Hours of Silverstone and changed the driver lineups of both cars. Weeda, Bouchut (in for Rossiter who was racing in the Japanese Super Formula Championship) and Liuzzi drove the No. 31 T128 and Holzer, Kraihamer and Charouz raced the No. 32 vehicle. Due to variable weather conditions, Kraihamer and Charouz qualified fifth on the grid in class, while Liuzzi and Bouchut qualified sixth. During the first hour, the No. 31 car was forced into the pit lane due to electrical issues, while Charouz and Nicolas Minassian's No. 49 Pecom Racing Nissan Oreca 03 entry collided.

Later, the No. 31 car's steering issues prevented it from finishing, and the No. 32 car's electrical problems prevented it from completing enough laps to be classified in the final results. Rossiter returned to Lotus for the season's second race, the 6 Hours of Spa-Francorchamps, and replaced Bouchut as one of the three drivers of the No. 32 car. Both cars started from the fourth row of the grid with Liuzzi and Rossiter's No. 31 T128 seventh and Holter and Kraihamer's sister No. 32 vehicle eighth. Due to alternator issues, both vehicles were slowed down in the race but were still able to finish in their respective class positions (albeit switched with the No. 32 in seventh and the No. 31 in eighth).

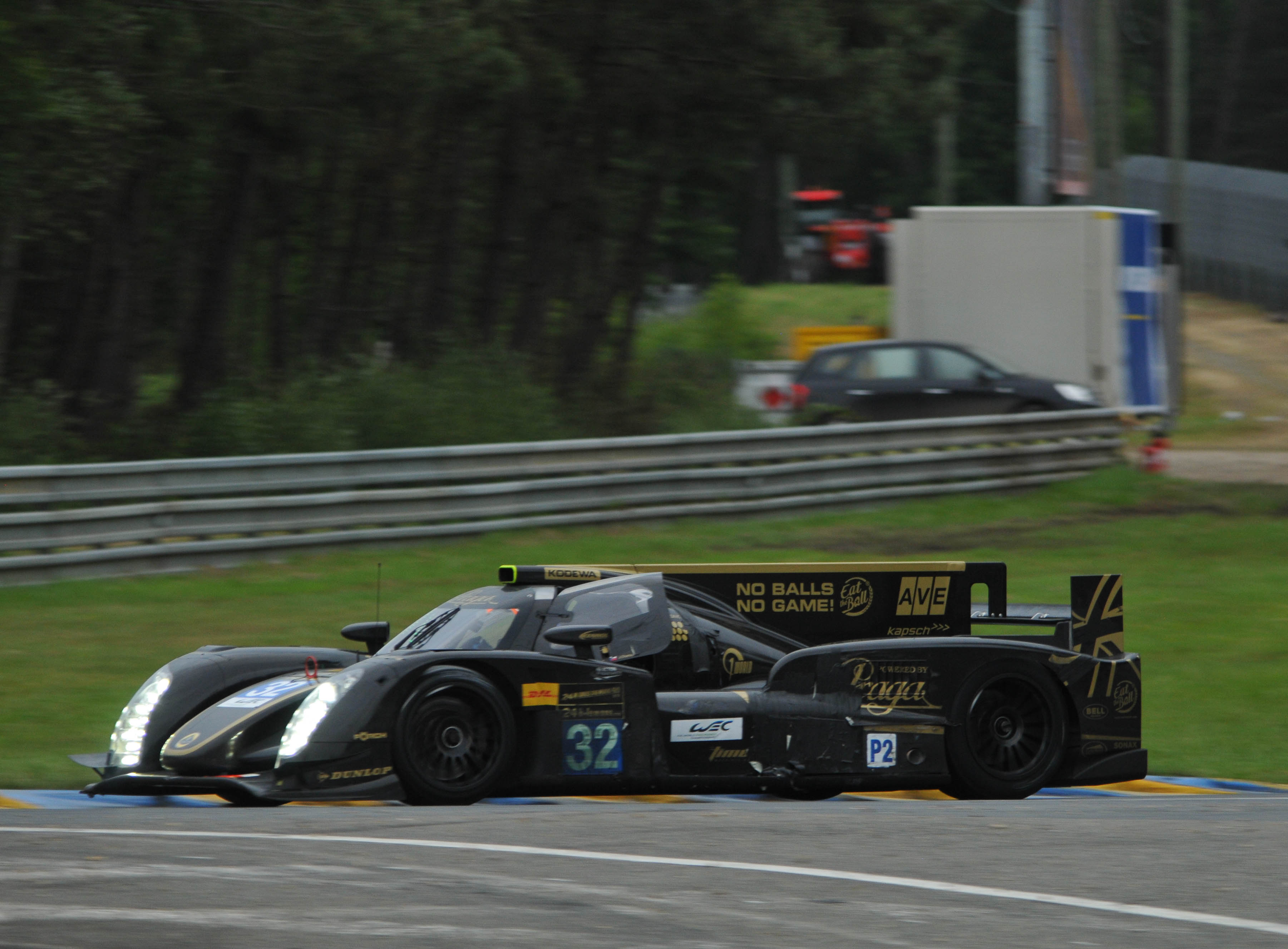
The No. 31 Lotus T128 at the 24 Hours of Le Mans showing the damage on its left-hand side and with the open left door.

Bouchut set the fastest time for the No. 31 car in the first qualifying session for the 24 Hours of Le Mans, placing him 15th in class, while Holzer secured 16th for the No. 32 car in the third (and final) qualifying session. Soon after, the No. 32 was relegated to the back of the Le Mans Prototype 2 (LMP2) grid for failing to have all three of their drivers set qualifying lap times within 110 per cent of the class leader's pole time. Weeda spun entering the second Mulsanne Chicane and beached the No. 31 car across the kerbs in the second hour due to the changing weather. The car pulled over at the side of the track after 17 laps and was declared retired four hours later with electrical problems. The No. 32 crew were impeded by the left door becoming loose twice and it later lost its rear body cover. Furthermore, the trio's lack of experience due to their young combined age and reoccurring engine overheating issues dropped the car down the order. In the 17th hour, a bell housing failure in the No. 32 car damaged its fitted auxiliaries, curtailing Lotus's race prematurely.

==== Legal issues ====
Lotus filed a lawsuit against Chosse, ADESS, and SCE Solutions on June 17 after learning that the team's owners, Romulus and Colin Kolles, were in debt. Choose filed a complaint in a French court, claiming that the owners of Kolles owed them "a seven-figure amount" in unpaid invoices. On June 18, Chosse responded, and at 17:00 local time, a bailiff seized the two Lotus T128s. Lotus presented fictitious invoices from ADESS, and on the afternoon of June 19, the Le Mans court decided in favour of Lotus. The court mandated that Lotus receive both vehicles back. As of 2018, the legal battle is ongoing.

=== Podium in the Americas ===
For the 6 Hours of São Paulo, Rossiter was absent because of a Super GT commitment in Japan and Liuzzi was committed to racing in the Superstars Series, leaving Weeda and Bouchut to operate the No. 31 car as a two-person entry. Kraihamer and Holzer were among the top five in their class, while the second Lotus of Weeda and Bouchut were two places further back on the grid due to slower traffic. When Kraihamer lost control of the rear of the No. 32 car and hit the left-hand side of Stéphane Sarrazin's faster No. 8 Toyota TS030 Hybrid, the No. 32 car's race ended early. As a result, both vehicles ploughed into the turn three outside tyre barrier. Both drivers were unhurt. Bouchut's No. 31 vehicle had gearbox problems from the start of the race and was forced into the pit lane. Bouchut was able to return to the track but the car was not classified in the final results.

Lotus mechanics changed the No. 31 car's engine after practice for the inaugural 6 Hours of Circuit of the Americas, the fourth since the start of the season, resulting in a three-minute stop-and-go penalty for the team. The No. 31 car set the sixth-fastest average LMP2 lap time in qualifying, and Charouz went into the rear of Sarrazin's No. 8 Toyota TS030 Hybrid as they approached the first corner, sending the latter car into a spin. Rossiter collided with Pierre Kaffer's No. 49 Pecom Racing Nissan Oreca 03 at the first turn of the race. Due to extensive damage to the suspension of the T128, Rossiter was forced to withdraw the car from the race. But Kraihamer, Charouz, and Holzer's No. 32 car finished third to earn the team's only podium result of the season.

=== Season-ending races in Asia ===
As the team concentrated on finding the ideal setup for the 6 Hours of Fuji, both Lotus T128s qualified for the race in dry and sunny conditions, starting in eighth and ninth places (the No. 31 car ahead of the No. 32 vehicle). Typhoon Wipha's passing brought heavy rain to the area, preventing any competitive action and limiting the overall race winner to only 16 laps behind the safety car. Hence, both Lotus cars finished the race eighth and tenth. Bouchut replaced Rossiter, who was unavailable due to a Super Formula commitment at the Suzuka Circuit, for the 6 Hours of Shanghai. The No. 31 car qualified seventh, while the No. 32 car started eighth. In the first hour, Holzer and Niclas Jönsson's No. 57 AF Corse Ferrari 458 Italia collided, damaging the No. 32 car's left-rear corner and forcing it into the garage. The other T128 retired due to engine failure while the No. 31 recovered to seventh in class.

While Rossiter was announced as returning to co-drive the No. 31 for the season-ending 6 Hours of Bahrain, he was unable to attend, and thus Lucas Auer, the Formula Three European Championship fourth-place finisher and nephew of former Formula One driver Gerhard Berger, filled his place for his debut sports car endurance race. On the LMP2 grid, the two Lotus T128s qualified seventh and eighth. In the first hour, Liuzzi collided with the No. 35 OAK Racing Nissan Morgan LMP2, sending the No. 31 car into the gravel trap. A few minutes later, Kraihamer made an error and collided with Richard Lietz's No. 92 Porsche 911 RSR left-rear corner. The Lotus stopped for 20 laps at turn ten before being declared a non-finisher due to heavy damage. Competing with the T128, the Lotus team accumulated 37 and 11 points for both cars, placing them seventh and eighth respectively in the FIA Endurance Trophy for LMP2 Teams. After the season, Lotus switched to the LMP1 class and replaced the T128s with the new CLM P1/01 car.

== Results summary ==
(key) Races in bold indicates pole position. Races in italics indicates fastest lap.

Complete FIA World Endurance Championship results
Year	Team	Chassis	Engine	Class	Drivers	No.	Rds.	Rounds									FIA LMP2
Year	Team	Chassis	Engine	Class	Drivers	No.	Rds.	1	2	3	4	5	6	7	8	Pts.	Pos.
2013	Lotus	Lotus T128	Praga Judd 3.6 L V8	LMP2	Lucas Auer; Christophe Bouchut; Vitantonio Liuzzi; James Rossiter; Kevin Weeda	31	8; 1, 3–4, 7; 1–2, 5–8; 2–3, 5–6; 1–8	SIL; Ret	SPA; 6	LMS; Ret	SÃO; Ret	COA; Ret	FUJ; 7	SHA; Ret	BHR; Ret	11	8th
2013	Lotus	Lotus T128	Praga Judd 3.6 L V8	LMP2	Jan Charouz; Thomas Holzer; Dominik Kraihamer	32	1–8; 1–8; 1–8	SIL; NC	SPA; 5	LMS; Ret	SÃO; Ret	COA; 3	FUJ; 6	SHA; 6	BHR; Ret	37	7th
