= Rui Águas (racing driver) =

Portuguese racing driver (born 1972)

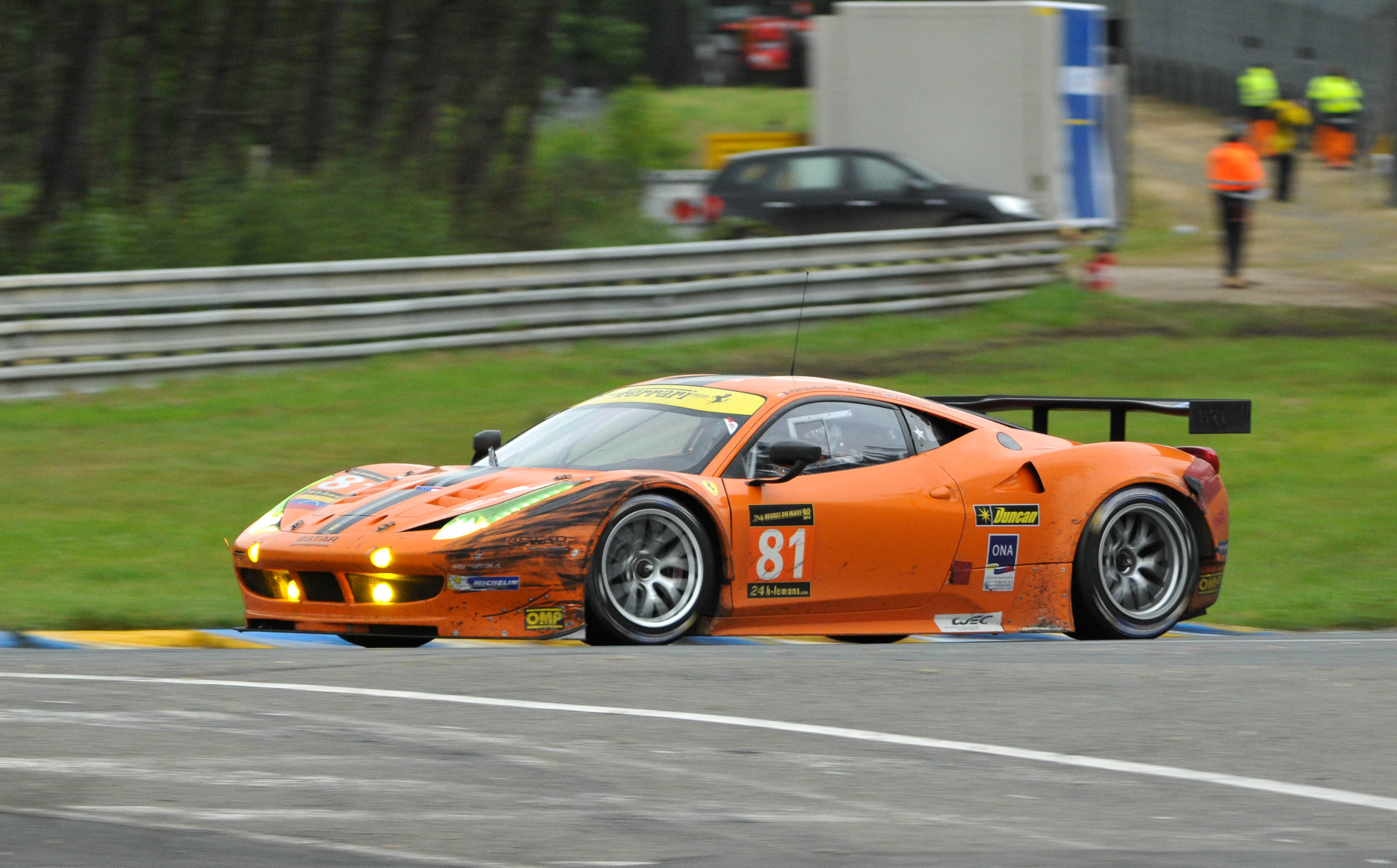
- Nationality: (Portugal) Portuguese
- Born: February 29, 1972 (age 54) Nampula, Mozambique
- Categorisation: FIA Silver (until 2013, 2015–2016, 2023–); FIA Gold (2014, 2017–2022)

24 Hours of Le Mans career
- Years: 2011–2013, 2015–2016
- Teams: AF Corse-Waltrip, 8 Star Motorsports
- Best finish: 26th (2015)
- Class wins: 0

Rui Sérgio de Almeida Águas (born February 29, 1972, in Nampula, Mozambique) is a Mozambican-born Portuguese race car driver. Águas spent two seasons in Formula 3000, driving for Nordic in 1997 and Auto Sport and Coloni in 1998. He has since moved on to Formula Nissan and Renault Eurocup, before making a name for himself on the GT class, being one of the top contenders of the GT2 category, always at the wheel of a Ferrari. He is currently racing on the International GT Open.

Águas has also, prior to his Formula 3000 days, driven for the Marko, Tomakidis, KMS and GM teams in German Formula Three, and also spent some of 1994 in British Formula Renault Championship, finishing second for Martello Racing.

In 1992, Águas was a works driver for Van Diemen on the British and European FF1800 championship.

For 2012, Águas competed in the FIA World Endurance Championship in an AF Waltrip Ferrari F458 Italia.

In 2025, Águas and his co-driver Cristiano Maciel won the overall GT Winter Series title.

== Racing record ==
=== Complete International Formula 3000 results ===
(key) (Races in bold indicate pole position; races in italics indicate fastest lap.)

Year	Entrant	Chassis	Engine	1	2	3	4	5	6	7	8	9	10	11	12	Pos.	Pts
1997	Nordic Racing	Lola T96/50	Zytek-Judd	SIL; Ret	PAU; 9	HEL; 5	NÜR; 7	PER; Ret	HOC; DSQ	A1R; 4	SPA; 9	MUG; 12	JER; 5			10th	7
1998	Auto Sport Racing	Lola T96/50	Zytek-Judd	OSC; 9	IMO											25th	0
1998	Coloni Motorsport	Lola T96/50	Zytek-Judd			CAT; 17	SIL; 17	MON; 7	PAU; Ret	A1R	HOC; Ret	HUN	SPA	PER	NÜR	25th	0

=== 24 Hours of Le Mans results ===
Year	Team	Co-Drivers	Car	Class	Laps	Pos.	Class Pos.
2011	(Italy) AF Corse-Waltrip	(United States) Rob Kauffmann (United States) Michael Waltrip	Ferrari 458 Italia GT2	GTE; Pro	178	DNF	DNF
2012	(Italy) AF Corse-Waltrip	(United States) Rob Kauffmann (United States) Brian Vickers	Ferrari 458 Italia GT2	GTE; Am	294	31st	6th
2013	(United States) 8 Star Motorsports	(Venezuela) Enzo Potolicchio (Australia) Jason Bright	Ferrari 458 Italia GT2	GTE; Am	294	37th	10th
2015	(Italy) AF Corse	(France) Emmanuel Collard (France) François Perrodo	Ferrari 458 Italia GT2	GTE; Am	330	26th	4th
2016	(Italy) AF Corse	(France) Emmanuel Collard (France) François Perrodo	Ferrari 458 Italia GT2	GTE; Am	331	27th	**2nd**

=== Complete FIA World Endurance Championship results ===
Year	Entrant	Class	Car	Engine	1	2	3	4	5	6	7	8	9	Rank	Points
2012	AF Corse-Waltrip	LMGTE Am	Ferrari 458 Italia GT2	Ferrari 4.5 L V8	SEB; 4	SPA; DNS	LMS; 4	SIL	SÃO	**BHR**; 2	FUJ	SHA; 4		4th†	108†
2013	8 Star Motorsports	LMGTE Am	Ferrari 458 Italia GT2	Ferrari 4.5 L V8	SIL; 3	SPA; 1	LMS; 1	SÃO; 2	**COA**; 4	FUJ; 4	SHA; 1	BHR; 2		2nd	128
2015	AF Corse	LMGTE Am	Ferrari 458 Italia GT2	Ferrari 4.5 L V8	SIL; 2	SPA; 2	LMS; 3	NÜR; 3	COA; 3	FUJ; 3	SHA; 1	BHR		4th	136
2016	AF Corse	LMGTE Am	Ferrari 458 Italia GT2	Ferrari 4.5 L V8	SIL; 1	SPA; 2	LMS; 2	NÜR; 2	MEX; 2	COA; 6	FUJ; 2	SHA; 2	BHR; 3	1st	188

† There was no drivers championship that year, the result indicates team rank in the LMGTE Am Trophy.

=== Complete IMSA SportsCar Championship results ===
(key) (Races in bold indicate pole position) (Races in italics indicate fastest lap)

Year	Entrant	Class	Make	Engine	1	2	3	4	5	6	7	8	9	10	Pos.	Points
2015	AF Corse	GTD	Ferrari 458 Italia GT3	Ferrari 4.5L V8	DAY; 4	SEB; 10†	LGA	BEL	WGL	LIM	ELK	VIR	AUS	ATL	34th	30

^{†} Águas did not complete sufficient laps in order to score full points.
