= Delta Motorsport =

English racing automobile engineering consulting firm

(United Kingdom) Delta Motorsport
- Founded: 2005
- Team principal(s): Nick Carpenter; Simon Dowson
- Former series: Superleague Formula; Grand Prix Masters

Delta Motorsport was a British engineering consultancy established in 2005. They were acquired by Cosworth in 2021 and are based near the Silverstone Circuit at Silverstone Park. It was renamed Delta Cosworth after the transition into Cosworth.

They are known for designing and building the cars that competed in the Grand Prix Masters series.

Delta Motorsport provided all engineering support for Alan Docking Racing and their five Superleague Formula cars. Their LMP2 car won the Silverstone round of the 2013 FIA World Endurance Championship.

In they previously provided engineering support to Hitech Racing.

In 2011, the Delta E-4 electric sports car was unveiled with Oxford University designed YASA electric motors, which produce over 443lb ft of torque and over 118bhp each.

In 2018, Delta started developing an electric vehicle platform called S2 and was supported by state funding via Innovate UK.

In 2025 Cosworth decided to end their energy storage system design capabilities so the company became dormant.
