= Carlos Hank =

Carlos Hank may refer to:

- Carlos Hank González (1927–2001), Mexican politician and businessman
- Carlos Hank Rhon (born 1947), Mexican businessman, son of the above
- Carlos Hank González (businessman, born 1971), son of the above
- Carlos Hank Guerreiro (born 2000), Mexican Olympic equestrian, son of the above
