= Carlos Hank González (businessman, born 1971) =

Mexican businessman and banker

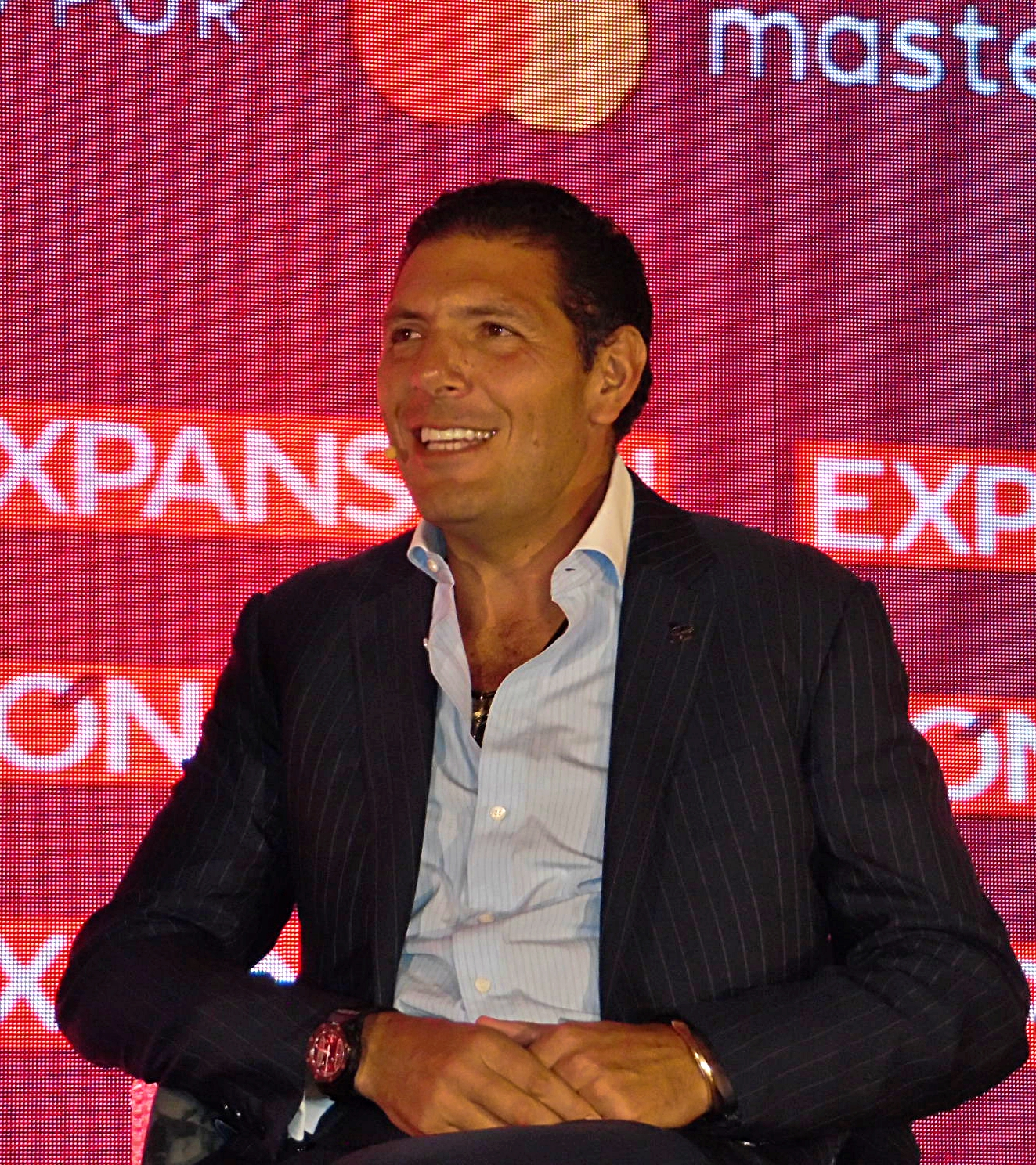
- Born: September 1, 1971 (age 54); Mexico
- Education: Universidad Iberoamericana
- Occupations: Banker, businessman
- Known for: Chairman of Banorte; CEO of Grupo Hermes
- Board member of: Gruma; Mexican Stock Exchange; Grupo Televisa
- Father: Carlos Hank Rhon
- Relatives: Carlos Hank González (grandfather); Roberto González Barrera (grandfather); Jorge Hank Rhon (uncle); Carlos Hank Guerreiro (son)

Carlos Hank González (born September 1, 1971) is a Mexican businessman and banker. He is the chairman of Grupo Financiero Banorte, CEO of Grupo Industrial Hermes, vice-chairman of the Board of Directors of Gruma, and a member of the Board of Directors of the Mexican Stock Exchange. He has been ranked by Expansión as one of the most important entrepreneurs in Mexico and is a member of the Business Advisory Council of president Andrés Manuel López Obrador.

== Early life and education ==
Carlos Hank González is the son of the billionaire Carlos Hank Rhon and the grandson of the politician Carlos Hank González and businessman Roberto González Barrera. He is of German and Spanish descent. Hank González has a degree in Business Administration with a specialization in Finance from the Universidad Iberoamericana.

== Career ==
After university, Hank González began his career as a broker at Interacciones Casa de Bolsa and later became its CEO. In 1994, he led the opening of the first Mercedes-Benz car distributor in Mexico.

He served as CEO of Grupo Financiero Interacciones from 2000 until 2014. In 2008, he was also appointed CEO of Grupo Hermes. In December 2012, he became vice-chairman of the Board of Directors of Gruma. In November 2014, he was appointed chairman of the Board of Directors of Grupo Financiero Banorte and assumed the position in January 2015. In 2018, he led the merger between Banorte and Grupo Financiero Interacciones.

In April 2017, he became a member of the Board of Directors of Grupo Televisa. In 2018, he was appointed a member of the Business Advisory Council of the president´of Mexico, Andrés Manuel López Obrador. In 2019, he was a founding signatory of the Principles for Responsible Banking presented at the United Nations headquarters. In April 2021, he was appointed a member of the Board of Directors of the Mexican Stock Exchange.

== Awards and recognition ==
In 2015, he was included in the Merco list of the 50 leaders with the best reputation in Mexico. In 2016, he received an award from the ALAS20 initiative, recognizing him as Board Director of the Leading Institution in Responsible Investments. He was listed in the Forbes México Billionaires ranking in 2020 and 2021. He has ranked in Expansión's "The 100 Most Important Entrepreneurs in Mexico" numerous times, including in 2014 and 2017 through 2021.

== Personal life ==
Hank González is married and has three children.
