= Ricardo González (racing driver) =

Mexican racing driver

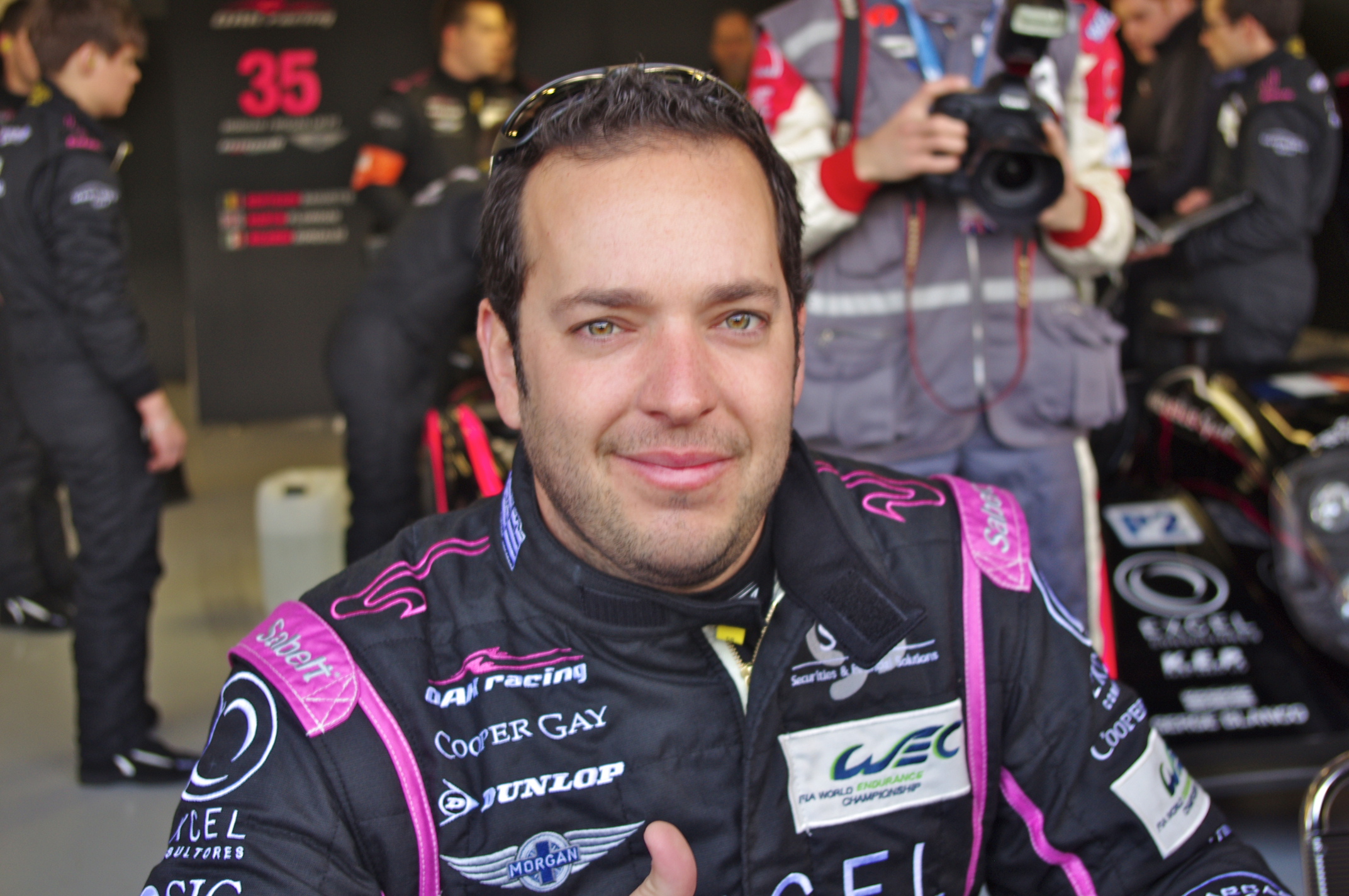
- Nationality: (Mexico) Mexican
- Born: Ricardo Benjamín González Valdés; 20 October 1977 (age 49) Monterrey, Mexico
- Relatives: Roberto González (brother)

FIA World Endurance Championship career
- Debut season: 2012
- Current team: (Mexico) RGR Sport by Morand
- Categorisation: FIA Silver
- Car number: 43
- Former teams: Greaves Motorsport; OAK Racing; G-Drive Racing
- Starts: 71
- Wins: 7
- Poles: 3
- Fastest laps: 2
- Best finish: 24 Hours of Le Mans in 2013

Previous series
- FIA World Endurance Championship

Championship titles
- 2011 2013: American Le Mans Series LMPC class FIA WEC LMP2 class

Awards
- 1999: Rookie of the year Indy Lights Panamericana
24 Hours of Le Mans career
- Years: 2012, 2013, 2015, 2016
- Teams: (United Kingdom) Greaves Motorsport (France) OAK Racing (Russia) G-Drive Racing (Mexico) RGR Sport
- Best finish: 7th (2013)
- Class wins: 1 LMP2 (2013)

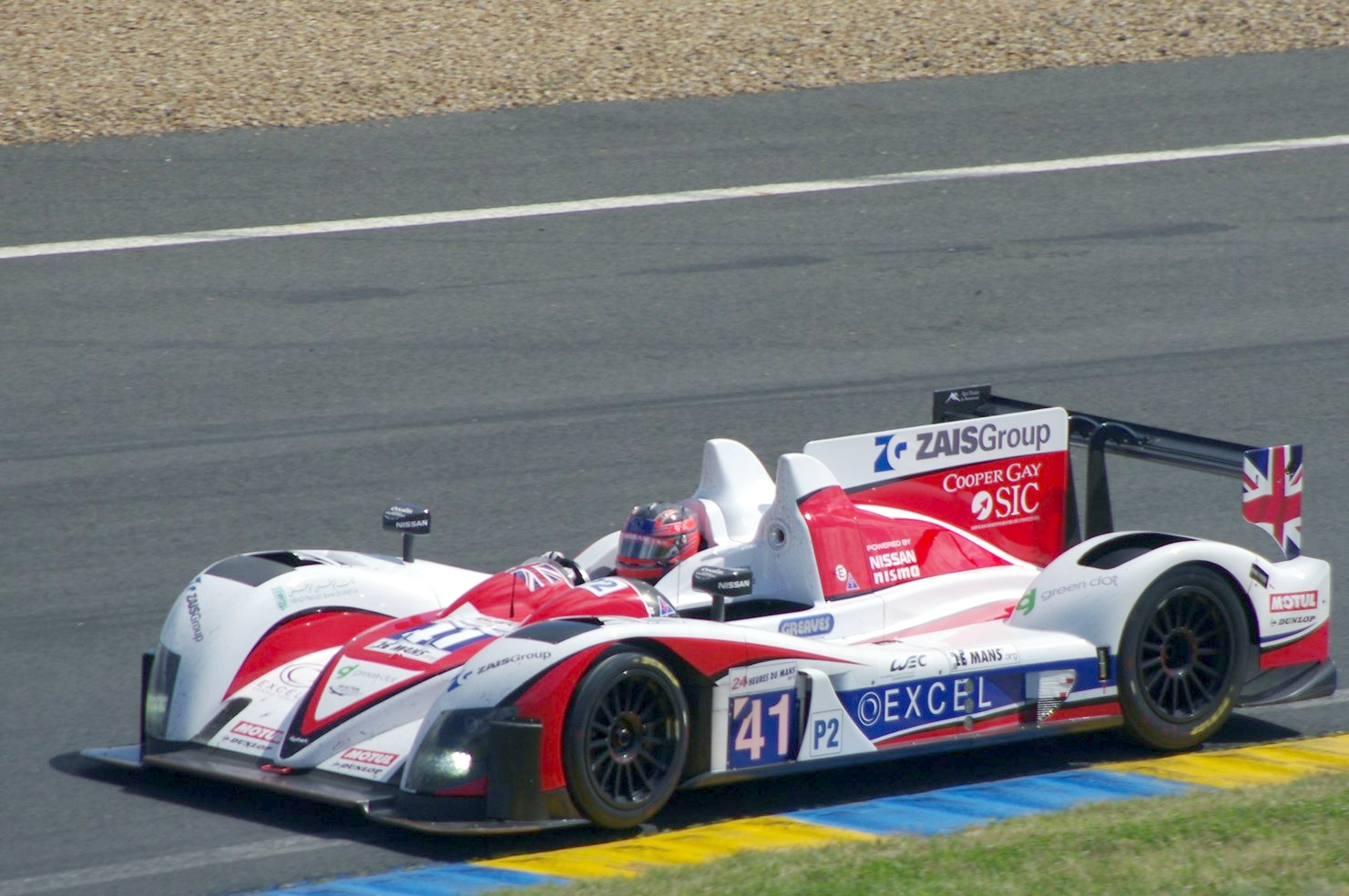
González in the 2012 24 Hours of Le Mans

Ricardo Benjamín González Valdés (born 20 October 1977 in Monterrey) is a Mexican racing driver who competes in the FIA World Endurance Championship. In 2013, he won the 24 Hours of Le Mans in LMP2 class and 2013 FIA WEC World Champion LMP2 class for drivers and teams.

In the 2016 FIA World Endurance Championship, González participated as owner and pilot of the rookie Mexican team RGR Sport by Morand in the LMP2 class The car, co-driven by Filipe Albuquerque and Bruno Senna, won 16th overall and tenth in the LMP2 category in 2016 24 Hours of Le Mans. González did not participate in any of the following seasons of the World Endurance Championship.

== Personal life ==
González comes from a family of drivers; his father Roberto González Sr. finished in third place in the 12 Hours of Sebring in 1976 and his brother Roberto Jr. competed in the Champ Car World Series in 2003 and 2004. He is a father of four children and lives with his family in Mexico City. His grandfather Roberto González Barrera was the chairman of food company Gruma and bank Banorte. His daughter Roberta Luciana, at 11 years old is a 2013 National equestrian champion in Mexico.

González is the president of the foundation ASUCQ which was formed to create Arkansas State University-Campus Querétaro, a campus of the Arkansas State University System in Querétaro, Mexico. The campus opened with its first class of students on 4 September 2017.

== Racing career ==
=== 1994 - 95 ===
In 1994-1995, González was the youngest driver to participate in the Mexican F3 FIA; His career began in karts in 1990.

=== 1999 - 2000 ===
Indy Lights Panamericana

=== 2001 ===
In 2001, González took part in the Formula Chrysler Euroseries as teammate to his older brother Roberto at Swiss team Alpie Motorsport. Ricardo finished the season fourth as Roberto was runner-up. In 2003, he raced in the World Series by Nissan.

=== 2010 ===
In 2010, González returned from a seven-year break from racing to contest the American Le Mans Series. After starting four races in the GTC class, he and teammate Luis Díaz switched to the LMPC class for the final four rounds of the season.

=== 2011 ===
In the 2011 season, González drove for Core Autosport team in the American Le Mans Series LMPC class with his co-driver Gunnar Jeannette, they got the victory in two races, GP of Long Beach and GP of Mosport, and with 156 points, they won the American Le Mans Series season.

=== 2012 ===
In 2012 González raced in the FIA World Endurance Championship for Greaves Motorsport alongside Elton Julian and Christian Zugel.

In the 24 Hours of Le Mans, González and his co-drivers Julian and Zugel from Greaves Motorsport Zytek Z11SN-Nissan team, got fifth place in the LMP2 class (twelfth overall).

=== 2013 ===
For 2013, González was hired by OAK Morgan-Nissan to drive Morgan-Nissans in the LMP2 class on the FIA World Endurance Championship. González shares the number 35 entry with co-drivers Bertrand Baguette and Martin Plowman.

The 2013 season started at the 6 Hours of Silverstone, the OAK Racing Morgan LMP2-Nissan No. 35 finished in fourth place (twelfth overall) to get their first 10 points for the World Championship.

On the 6 Hours of Spa-Francorchamps, González, Baguette and Plowman finished in third position (for cars registered for points in the FIA World Endurance Championship), of LMP2 class (eleventh overall).

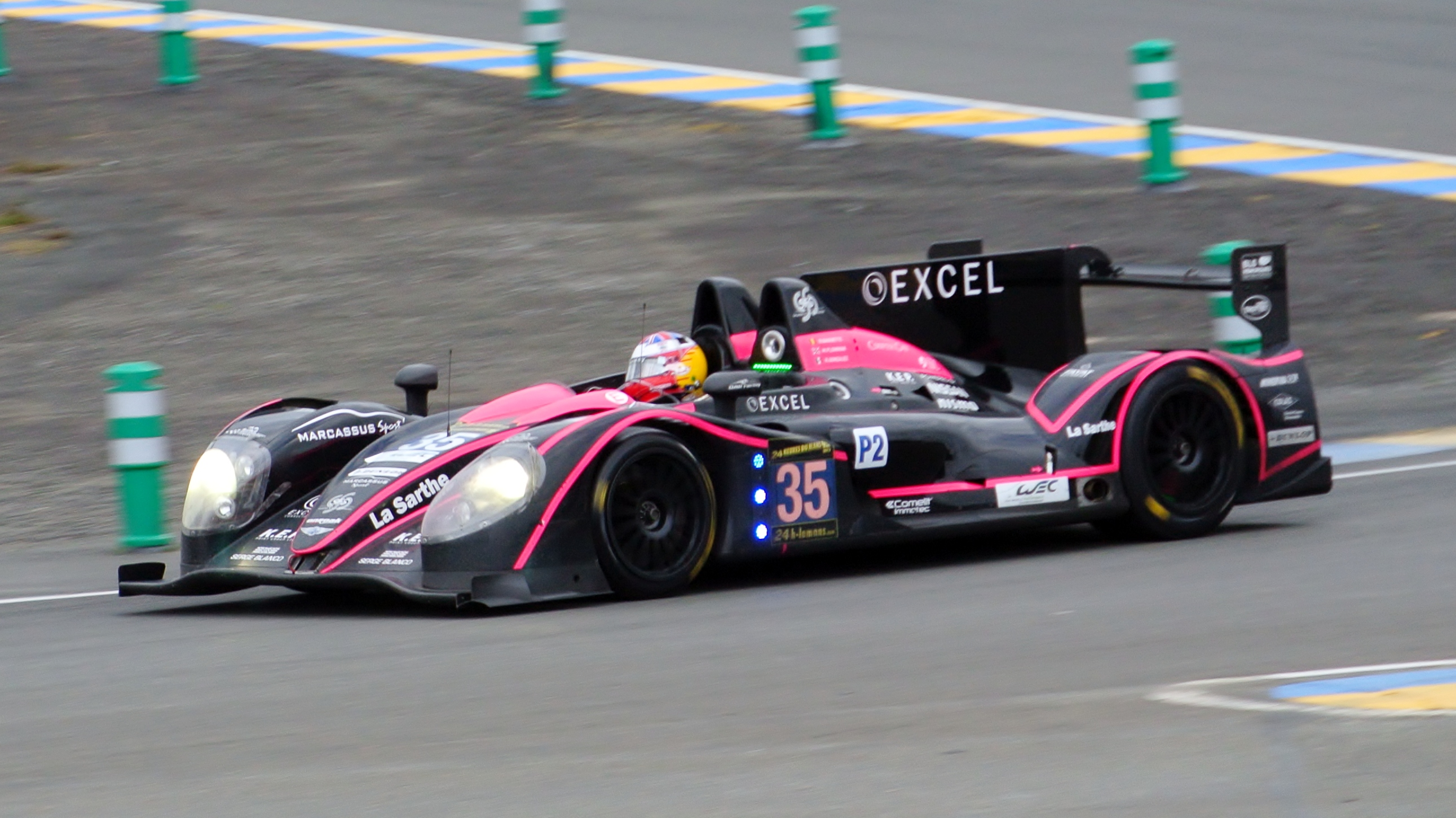
Martin Plowman, González's co-driver at the 2013 24 Hours of Le Mans winners of class LMP2

In 24 Hours of Le Mans, González and his co-drivers Bertrand Baguette and Martin Plowman from OAK Racing Morgan LMP2-Nissan team, won 81st edition of the 24 Hours of Le Mans in LMP2 class (seventh overall). Their Morgan LMP2 covered a total of 329 laps in the Circuit de la Sarthe. The race was run in very difficult weather conditions and several serious accidents bringing out a record of twelve safety car caution periods. So, González became the first Mexican driver to get the first place of since Pedro Rodríguez in 1968. González recognize to Pedro Rodríguez as his hero. Heavy rains forced race officials to start the race under safety car conditions, completing eight laps before the race was temporarily stopped due to no improvement in track conditions.

The 6 Hours of São Paulo was held at the Autódromo José Carlos Pace, on 30 August–1 September. González, Baguette and Plowman got the second place of LMP2 category, only behind Oreca 03-Nissan team (Rusinov, Martin and Conway). With this result the Mexican driver got his second podium of the year.

In the fifth round of 2013 season were the 6 Hours of Circuit of the Americas in Austin, Texas on 20–22 September. González, Baguette and Plowman obtained the seventh place of LMP2 category (eleventh overall).

On 18–20 October, in the 6 hours of Fuji, following a two-hour delay the race was restarted once more under the safety car, lapping another eight circuits before officials stopped the race again and eventually called an end to the event. The No. 35 OAK Morgan-Nissan (Baguette, González and Plowman), started in the pole position and was declared the race winner of LMP2 class (fourth overall), in the same position they started. Due to difficult weather conditions half points will be awarded for all the teams and drivers in the event.

During the 6 Hours of Shanghai on 8–9 November, the No. 35 OAK Morgan-Nissan trio (Baguette, González and Plowman), qualified in fourth position and finished in third place (7th overall). With this new podium the French team extend their lead on 15 points to the final race of the championship.

On the last race of the season the 6 Hours of Bahrain on 29–30 November, González, Baguette and Plowman qualified in sixth place and finished in fourth position (sixth overall). Therefore, the Mexican Ricardo González won the 2013 FIA WEC World Championship for drivers and teams in LMP2 class.

=== 2014 ===
Le Castellet, France – April 2, 2014 – González would compete in the 2014 European Le Mans Series with ART Grand Prix driving a McLaren MP4-12C GT3 in GTC class. González would run for the first time in his career in a GT3 car, which he would share with Alex Brundle and Karim Ajlani.

=== 2015 ===
In 2015, González returned to FIA World Endurance Championship with the Russian team G-Drive Racing along with his co-drivers Gustavo Yacamán and Pipo Derani.

=== 2016 ===
In 2016, González returned to FIA World Endurance Championship as owner and driver of the Mexican team RGR Sport by Morand. His co-drivers were ex Formula 1 Bruno Senna and Filipe Albuquerque.

In the 6 Hours of Silverstone, the Mexican rookie team won the race in the LMP2 Class (fifth overall), incredible result in their debut as a team.

Second podium for González and the Mexican team in the 6 Hours of Nürburgring (ninth overall), only behind #36 car Signatech Alpine.

On the fifth race of the season, the 6 Hours of Mexico, the Aztec squad achieved the first place in the LMP2 class (sixth overall), with the minimal advantage of 1.985 seconds over the second place, the No. 36 Signatech Alpine. The car No. 43 started from the pole position but missing four hours and four minutes the car fell to third place due to a contact with the No. 26 G-Drive Racing but rallied to take the checkered flag in the rain with Albuquerque behind the wheel. The RGR Sport by Morand recorded the fastest lap on turn number 28. Great success for González as principal, driver and promoter of the event in his home soil.

=== 24 Hours of Le Mans results ===
Year	Team	Co-Drivers	Car	Class	Laps	Pos.	Class Pos.
2012	(United Kingdom) Greaves Motorsport	(Germany) Christian Zugel (Ecuador) Elton Julian	Zytek Z11SN-Nissan	LMP2	348	12th	5th
2013	(France) OAK Racing	(Belgium) Bertrand Baguette (United Kingdom) Martin Plowman	Morgan LMP2-Nissan	LMP2	329	7th	1st
2015	(Russia) G-Drive Racing	(Colombia) Gustavo Yacamán (Brazil) Pipo Derani	Ligier JS P2-Nissan	LMP2	354	12th	4th
2016	(Mexico) RGR Sport by Morand	(Portugal) Filipe Albuquerque (Brazil) Bruno Senna	Ligier JS P2-Nissan	LMP2	344	14th	10th

=== Complete FIA World Endurance Championship results ===
Year	Team	Class	Car	Engine	1	2	3	4	5	6	7	8	9	Rank	Points
2012	Greaves Motorsport	LMP2	Zytek Z11SN	Nissan VK45DE 4.5 L V8	SEB; 4	SPA; 6	LMS; 5	SIL; 12	SÃO; DNP	BHR; 7	FUJ; 7	SHA; 8		5th	56
2013	OAK Racing	LMP2	Morgan LMP2	Nissan VK45DE 4.5 L V8	SIL; 4	SPA; 3	LMS; 1	SÃO; 2	COA; 7	FUJ; 1	SHA; 3	BHR; 4		1st	141.5
2015	G-Drive Racing	LMP2	Ligier JS P2	Nissan VK45DE 4.5 L V8	SIL; 2	SPA; 1	LMS; 3	NÜR; 3	COA; 3	FUJ; 3	SHA; Ret	BHR; 3		3rd	134
2016	RGR Sport by Morand	LMP2	Ligier JS P2	Nissan VK45DE 4.5 L V8	SIL; 1	SPA; 4	LMS; 6	NÜR; 2	MEX; 1	COA; 2	FUJ; 2	SHA; 3	BHR; 2	2nd	166

* Season in progress.

=== European Le Mans Series results ===
Year	Team	Car	Engine	Class	Tyres	1	2	3	4	5	Rank	Points
2014	ART Grand Prix	McLaren MP4-12C GT3	McLaren 3.8L V8	GTC	M	UK; 5	ITA; 4	AUS; 8	FRA; 8	POR; Ret	14th	38

* Season still in progress.

Sporting positions
Preceded by none	FIA Endurance Trophy for LMP2 Drivers; 2013 with: Bertrand Baguette; Martin Plowman	Succeeded by Sergey Zlobin
