= Estadio Banorte (disambiguation) =

Estadio Banorte is a stadium in Mexico City also known as Estadio Azteca.

Estadio Banorte may also refer to:

- Estadio Banorte (Monterrey), formerly Estadio Borregos, a multi-purpose stadium in Monterrey, Mexico
- Estadio Dorados, a stadium in Culiacán, Mexico, branded as such between 2004 and 2020

== See also ==
- Banorte, the namesake bank
