= Ixe =

Ixe may refer to:

- Ixe, a banking brand of Mexican bank holding company Banorte
- Mangalore International Airport, Karnataka, India, IATA airport code IXE
