= 2013 6 Hours of Bahrain =

Sports car endurance race held at Bahrain International Circuit, Sakhir, Bahrain

Coordinates: 26°1′57″N 50°30′38″E

Event information
- Round 8 of 8 in the 2013 FIA World Endurance Championship
- Date: 30 November 2013
- Location: Sakhir
- Venue: Bahrain International Circuit
- Duration: 6 Hours

Results
- Laps completed: 199
- Distance (km): 1076.988
- Distance (miles): 669.237
- LMP1

Pole position
- Time: 1:42.449
- Team: (Japan) Toyota Racing

Winners
- Team: (Japan) Toyota Racing
- Drivers: (United Kingdom) Anthony Davidson (Switzerland) Sébastien Buemi (France) Stéphane Sarrazin
- LMP2

Winners
- Team: (Russia) G-Drive Racing
- Drivers: (Russia) Roman Rusinov (Australia) John Martin (United Kingdom) Mike Conway
- LMGTE Pro

Winners
- Team: (Italy) AF Corse
- Drivers: (Italy) Gianmaria Bruni (Finland) Toni Vilander
- LMGTE Am

Winners
- Team: (United Kingdom) Aston Martin Racing
- Drivers: (Denmark) Kristian Poulsen (Denmark) Christoffer Nygaard (Denmark) Nicki Thiim

The 2013 6 Hours of Bahrain was an endurance auto race held at the Bahrain International Circuit in Sakhir, Bahrain on 30 November 2013. The race was the eighth and final round of the 2013 FIA World Endurance Championship. The race was won by Sébastien Buemi, Stéphane Sarrazin and Anthony Davidson driving the No.8 Toyota TS030 Hybrid of Toyota Racing.

== Qualifying ==
=== Qualifying result ===
Pole position winners in each class are marked in bold.

Pos	Class	Team	Average Time	Grid
1	**LMP1**	**No. 7 Toyota Racing**	**1:42.449**	1
2	LMP1	No. 8 Toyota Racing	1:42.781	2
3	LMP1	No. 1 Audi Sport Team Joest	1:42.976	3
4	LMP1	No. 2 Audi Sport Team Joest	1:43.145	4
5	LMP1	No. 12 Rebellion Racing	1:46.728	5
6	**LMP2**	**No. 49 Pecom Racing**	**1:50.941**	6
7	LMP2	No. 26 G-Drive Racing	1:51.003	7
8	LMP2	No. 24 OAK Racing	1:51.718	8
9	LMP2	No. 41 Greaves Motorsport	1:51.841	9
10	LMP2	No. 25 Delta-ADR	1:52.133	10
11	LMP2	No. 35 OAK Racing	1:52.377	11
12	LMP2	No. 31 Lotus	1:53.217	12
13	LMP2	No. 32 Lotus	1:53.584	13
14	LMP2	No. 45 OAK Racing	1:54.033	14
15	**LMGTE Pro**	**No. 92 Porsche AG Team Manthey**	**1:58.833**	15
16	LMGTE Pro	No. 91 Porsche AG Team Manthey	1:58.960	16
17	LMGTE Pro	No. 97 Aston Martin Racing	1:59.038	17
18	LMGTE Pro	No. 71 AF Corse	1:59.049	18
19	LMGTE Pro	No. 99 Aston Martin Racing	1:59.167	19
20	LMGTE Pro	No. 51 AF Corse	1:59.459	20
21	**LMGTE Am**	**No. 95 Aston Martin Racing**	**2:00.303**	21
22	LMGTE Am	No. 81 8 Star Motorsports	2:00.337	22
23	LMGTE Am	No. 96 Aston Martin Racing	2:00.496	23
24	LMGTE Am	No. 61 AF Corse	2:00.527	24
25	LMGTE Am	No. 76 IMSA Performance Matmut	2:00.880	25
26	LMGTE Am	No. 88 Proton Competition	2:01.290	26
27	LMGTE Am	No. 57 Krohn Racing	2:01.563	27
28	LMGTE Am	No. 50 Larbre Compétition	2:03.236	28

== Race ==
=== Race result ===
Class winners in bold. Cars failing to complete 70% of winner's distance marked as Not Classified (NC).

Pos	Class	No	Team	Drivers	Chassis	Tyre	Laps	Time/Retired
Pos	Class	No	Team	Drivers	Engine	Tyre	Laps	Time/Retired
1	**LMP1**	**8**	**(Japan) Toyota Racing**	**(United Kingdom) Anthony Davidson (Switzerland) Sébastien Buemi (France) Stéphane Sarrazin**	**Toyota TS030 Hybrid**	MI	**199**	**6:01:15.303**
1	**LMP1**	**8**	**(Japan) Toyota Racing**	**(United Kingdom) Anthony Davidson (Switzerland) Sébastien Buemi (France) Stéphane Sarrazin**	**Toyota 3.4 L V8 (Hybrid)**	MI	**199**	**6:01:15.303**
2	LMP1	1	(Germany) Audi Sport Team Joest	(Germany) André Lotterer (Switzerland) Marcel Fässler (France) Benoît Tréluyer	Audi R18 e-tron quattro	MI	199	+1:10.585
2	LMP1	1	(Germany) Audi Sport Team Joest	(Germany) André Lotterer (Switzerland) Marcel Fässler (France) Benoît Tréluyer	Audi TDI 3.7 L Turbo V6 (Hybrid Diesel)	MI	199	+1:10.585
3	**LMP2**	**26**	**(Russia) G-Drive Racing**	**(Russia) Roman Rusinov (Australia) John Martin (United Kingdom) Mike Conway**	**Oreca 03**	D	**184**	**+15 Laps**
3	**LMP2**	**26**	**(Russia) G-Drive Racing**	**(Russia) Roman Rusinov (Australia) John Martin (United Kingdom) Mike Conway**	**Nissan VK45DE 4.5 L V8**	D	**184**	**+15 Laps**
4	LMP2	24	(France) OAK Racing	(France) Olivier Pla (United Kingdom) Alex Brundle (Denmark) David Heinemeier Hansson	Morgan LMP2	D	184	+15 Laps
4	LMP2	24	(France) OAK Racing	(France) Olivier Pla (United Kingdom) Alex Brundle (Denmark) David Heinemeier Hansson	Nissan VK45DE 4.5 L V8	D	184	+15 Laps
5	LMP2	41	(United Kingdom) Greaves Motorsport	(Belgium) Wolfgang Reip (United Kingdom) Jon Lancaster (Sweden) Björn Wirdheim	Zytek Z11SN	D	184	+15 Laps
5	LMP2	41	(United Kingdom) Greaves Motorsport	(Belgium) Wolfgang Reip (United Kingdom) Jon Lancaster (Sweden) Björn Wirdheim	Nissan VK45DE 4.5 L V8	D	184	+15 Laps
6	LMP2	35	(France) OAK Racing	(Belgium) Bertrand Baguette (United Kingdom) Martin Plowman (Mexico) Ricardo González	Morgan LMP2	D	182	+17 Laps
6	LMP2	35	(France) OAK Racing	(Belgium) Bertrand Baguette (United Kingdom) Martin Plowman (Mexico) Ricardo González	Nissan VK45DE 4.5 L V8	D	182	+17 Laps
7	LMP2	45	(France) OAK Racing	(France) Jacques Nicolet (Japan) Keiko Ihara (China) David Cheng	Morgan LMP2	D	180	+19 Laps
7	LMP2	45	(France) OAK Racing	(France) Jacques Nicolet (Japan) Keiko Ihara (China) David Cheng	Nissan VK45DE 4.5 L V8	D	180	+19 Laps
8	LMP2	25	(United Kingdom) Delta-ADR	(France) Fabien Giroix (United Kingdom) Robbie Kerr (United Kingdom) Craig Dolby	Oreca 03	D	178	+21 Laps
8	LMP2	25	(United Kingdom) Delta-ADR	(France) Fabien Giroix (United Kingdom) Robbie Kerr (United Kingdom) Craig Dolby	Nissan VK45DE 4.5 L V8	D	178	+21 Laps
9	**LMGTE; Pro**	**51**	**(Italy) AF Corse**	**(Italy) Gianmaria Bruni (Finland) Toni Vilander**	**Ferrari 458 Italia GT2**	MI	**175**	**+24 Laps**
9	**LMGTE; Pro**	**51**	**(Italy) AF Corse**	**(Italy) Gianmaria Bruni (Finland) Toni Vilander**	**Ferrari 4.5 L V8**	MI	**175**	**+24 Laps**
10	LMGTE; Pro	91	(Germany) Porsche AG Team Manthey	(Germany) Jörg Bergmeister (France) Patrick Pilet	Porsche 911 RSR	MI	175	+24 Laps
10	LMGTE; Pro	91	(Germany) Porsche AG Team Manthey	(Germany) Jörg Bergmeister (France) Patrick Pilet	Porsche 4.0 L Flat-6	MI	175	+24 Laps
11	LMGTE; Pro	71	(Italy) AF Corse	(Japan) Kamui Kobayashi (Italy) Giancarlo Fisichella	Ferrari 458 Italia GT2	MI	174	+25 Laps
11	LMGTE; Pro	71	(Italy) AF Corse	(Japan) Kamui Kobayashi (Italy) Giancarlo Fisichella	Ferrari 4.5 L V8	MI	174	+25 Laps
12	LMGTE; Pro	92	(Germany) Porsche AG Team Manthey	(Germany) Marc Lieb (Austria) Richard Lietz	Porsche 911 RSR	MI	174	+25 Laps
12	LMGTE; Pro	92	(Germany) Porsche AG Team Manthey	(Germany) Marc Lieb (Austria) Richard Lietz	Porsche 4.0 L Flat-6	MI	174	+25 Laps
13	**LMGTE; Am**	**95**	**(United Kingdom) Aston Martin Racing**	**(Denmark) Kristian Poulsen (Denmark) Christoffer Nygaard (Denmark) Nicki Thiim**	**Aston Martin Vantage GTE**	MI	**173**	**+26 Laps**
13	**LMGTE; Am**	**95**	**(United Kingdom) Aston Martin Racing**	**(Denmark) Kristian Poulsen (Denmark) Christoffer Nygaard (Denmark) Nicki Thiim**	**Aston Martin 4.5 L V8**	MI	**173**	**+26 Laps**
14	LMP2	49	(Argentina) Pecom Racing	(Argentina) Luís Pérez Companc (Germany) Pierre Kaffer (France) Nicolas Minassian	Oreca 03	MI	172	+27 Laps
14	LMP2	49	(Argentina) Pecom Racing	(Argentina) Luís Pérez Companc (Germany) Pierre Kaffer (France) Nicolas Minassian	Nissan VK45DE 4.5 L V8	MI	172	+27 Laps
15	LMGTE; Am	81	(United States) 8 Star Motorsports	(Venezuela) Enzo Potolicchio (Portugal) Rui Águas (Italy) Davide Rigon	Ferrari 458 Italia GT2	MI	172	+27 Laps
15	LMGTE; Am	81	(United States) 8 Star Motorsports	(Venezuela) Enzo Potolicchio (Portugal) Rui Águas (Italy) Davide Rigon	Ferrari 4.5 L V8	MI	172	+27 Laps
16	LMGTE; Am	61	(Italy) AF Corse	(France) Emmanuel Collard (Republic of Ireland) Matt Griffin (France) François Perrodo	Ferrari 458 Italia GT2	MI	172	+27 Laps
16	LMGTE; Am	61	(Italy) AF Corse	(France) Emmanuel Collard (Republic of Ireland) Matt Griffin (France) François Perrodo	Ferrari 4.5 L V8	MI	172	+27 Laps
17	LMGTE; Am	50	(France) Larbre Compétition	(France) Julien Canal (France) Patrick Bornhauser (Brazil) Fernando Rees	Chevrolet Corvette C6.R	MI	171	+28 Laps
17	LMGTE; Am	50	(France) Larbre Compétition	(France) Julien Canal (France) Patrick Bornhauser (Brazil) Fernando Rees	Chevrolet 5.5 L V8	MI	171	+28 Laps
18	LMGTE; Am	96	(United Kingdom) Aston Martin Racing	(United Kingdom) Jamie Campbell-Walter (United Kingdom) Stuart Hall (Germany) Roald Goethe	Aston Martin Vantage GTE	MI	169	+30 Laps
18	LMGTE; Am	96	(United Kingdom) Aston Martin Racing	(United Kingdom) Jamie Campbell-Walter (United Kingdom) Stuart Hall (Germany) Roald Goethe	Aston Martin 4.5 L V8	MI	169	+30 Laps
19	LMGTE; Am	76	(France) IMSA Performance Matmut	(France) Raymond Narac (France) Jean-Karl Vernay (Finland) Markus Palttala	Porsche 997 GT3-RSR	MI	162	+37 Laps
19	LMGTE; Am	76	(France) IMSA Performance Matmut	(France) Raymond Narac (France) Jean-Karl Vernay (Finland) Markus Palttala	Porsche 4.0 L Flat-6	MI	162	+37 Laps
DNF	LMGTE; Pro	99	(United Kingdom) Aston Martin Racing	(Portugal) Pedro Lamy (New Zealand) Richie Stanaway (Brazil) Bruno Senna	Aston Martin Vantage GTE	MI	145	Did Not Finish
DNF	LMGTE; Pro	99	(United Kingdom) Aston Martin Racing	(Portugal) Pedro Lamy (New Zealand) Richie Stanaway (Brazil) Bruno Senna	Aston Martin 4.5 L V8	MI	145	Did Not Finish
DNF	LMGTE; Pro	97	(United Kingdom) Aston Martin Racing	(United Kingdom) Darren Turner (Germany) Stefan Mücke	Aston Martin Vantage GTE	MI	109	Did Not Finish
DNF	LMGTE; Pro	97	(United Kingdom) Aston Martin Racing	(United Kingdom) Darren Turner (Germany) Stefan Mücke	Aston Martin 4.5 L V8	MI	109	Did Not Finish
DNF	LMP1	2	(Germany) Audi Sport Team Joest	(United Kingdom) Allan McNish (Denmark) Tom Kristensen (France) Loïc Duval	Audi R18 e-tron quattro	MI	93	Did Not Finish
DNF	LMP1	2	(Germany) Audi Sport Team Joest	(United Kingdom) Allan McNish (Denmark) Tom Kristensen (France) Loïc Duval	Audi TDI 3.7 L Turbo V6 (Hybrid Diesel)	MI	93	Did Not Finish
DNF	LMGTE; Am	88	(Germany) Proton Competition	(Germany) Christian Ried (Italy) Gianluca Roda (Italy) Paolo Ruberti	Porsche 997 GT3-RSR	MI	86	Did Not Finish
DNF	LMGTE; Am	88	(Germany) Proton Competition	(Germany) Christian Ried (Italy) Gianluca Roda (Italy) Paolo Ruberti	Porsche 4.0 L Flat-6	MI	86	Did Not Finish
DNF	LMGTE; Am	57	(United States) Krohn Racing	(United States) Tracy Krohn (Sweden) Niclas Jönsson (Italy) Maurizio Mediani	Ferrari 458 Italia GT2	MI	83	Did Not Finish
DNF	LMGTE; Am	57	(United States) Krohn Racing	(United States) Tracy Krohn (Sweden) Niclas Jönsson (Italy) Maurizio Mediani	Ferrari 4.5 L V8	MI	83	Did Not Finish
DNF	LMP1	7	(Japan) Toyota Racing	(Austria) Alexander Wurz (France) Nicolas Lapierre (Japan) Kazuki Nakajima	Toyota TS030 Hybrid	MI	64	Did Not Finish
DNF	LMP1	7	(Japan) Toyota Racing	(Austria) Alexander Wurz (France) Nicolas Lapierre (Japan) Kazuki Nakajima	Toyota 3.4 L V8 (Hybrid)	MI	64	Did Not Finish
DNF	LMP1	12	(Switzerland) Rebellion Racing	(Italy) Andrea Belicchi (Switzerland) Mathias Beche (France) Nicolas Prost	Lola B12/60	MI	44	Did Not Finish
DNF	LMP1	12	(Switzerland) Rebellion Racing	(Italy) Andrea Belicchi (Switzerland) Mathias Beche (France) Nicolas Prost	Toyota RV8KLM 3.4 L V8	MI	44	Did Not Finish
DNF	LMP2	32	(Czech Republic) Lotus	(Germany) Thomas Holzer (Austria) Dominik Kraihamer (Czech Republic) Jan Charouz	Lotus T128	D	5	Did Not Finish
DNF	LMP2	32	(Czech Republic) Lotus	(Germany) Thomas Holzer (Austria) Dominik Kraihamer (Czech Republic) Jan Charouz	Praga 3.6 L V8	D	5	Did Not Finish
DNF	LMP2	31	(Czech Republic) Lotus	(United States) Kevin Weeda (Austria) Lucas Auer (Italy) Vitantonio Liuzzi	Lotus T128	D	0	Did Not Finish
DNF	LMP2	31	(Czech Republic) Lotus	(United States) Kevin Weeda (Austria) Lucas Auer (Italy) Vitantonio Liuzzi	Praga 3.6 L V8	D	0	Did Not Finish

Tyre manufacturers
Key
Symbol	Tyre manufacturer
**D**	Dunlop
**MI**	Michelin

FIA World Endurance Championship
Previous race: 6 Hours of Shanghai	2013 season	Next race: None
