= Keiko Ihara =

Japanese racing driver

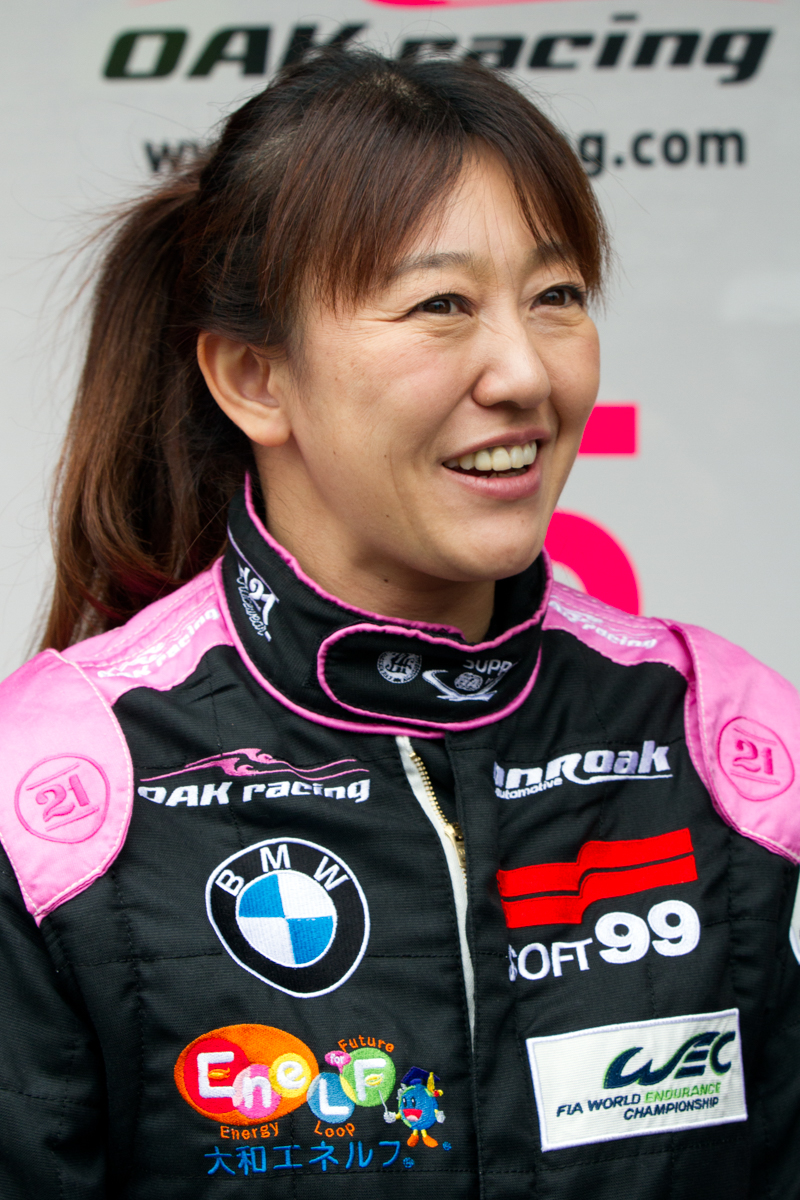
- Keiko Ihara at the 2014 6 Hours of Fuji
- Nationality: (Japan) Japanese
- Born: July 4, 1973 (age 53) Tokyo, Japan

FIA World Endurance Championship career
- Debut season: 2012
- Current team: Larbre Compétition
- Categorisation: FIA Silver (until 2013); FIA Bronze (2014–)
- Car number: 50
- Starts: 2
- Wins: 0
- Poles: 0
- Fastest laps: 0

Previous series
- 2009 2008 2005-06 2005 2004 2003 2003 2002 2001 2000: Formula Le Mans Cup; Aston Martin Asia Cup; British Formula Three; Masters of Formula 3 Le Mans Endurance Series; Super GT; Formula BMW Asia; Asia Formula 2000; French Formula Three; Formula Renault 2.0 UK

Keiko Ihara (井原 慶子, Ihara Keiko) (born July 4, 1973) is a Japanese auto racing driver and businesswoman. She was a former race queen, a model who appears in a swimsuit or other fashionable apparel at race circuits, before deciding to become a racing driver. She is one of the few Japanese women nationals to race internationally at a high level. Her best finishes in the British Formula Three Championship are two eighth places finishes in 2005, which helped her to a final championship standing position of 16th with 12 points. In the 2006 series, she finished in 17th and last position in the Championship Class, with four points.

Ihara joined the Gulf Racing Middle East to compete at the FIA World Endurance Championship in the LMP2 class with Jean-Denis Délétraz and Fabien Giroix as codrivers. In 2013, she raced two rounds for Gulf Racing Middle East and four with OAK Racing, both in the LMP2 class. The driver won the Fuji round of the 2014 Asian Le Mans Series for Oak Racing, together with Ho-Pin Tung and David Cheng.

As of 2025, Ihara is president of Future, a developer of hydrogen-assisted bicycles.

== Racing record ==
=== Career summary ===
Season	Series	Team	Races	Wins	Poles	Podiums	F/Laps	Points	Position
2000	Formula Renault 2.0 UK Championship		12	0	0	0	0	0	NC
2001	French Formula 3 Championship	ARTA/Signature	11	0	0	0	0	22	13th
2002	Asian Formula 2000	Autosports Racing Team	?	2	?	?	?	?	?
2002	Macau Asian Formula 2000 Challenge	Autosports Racing Team	1	0	0	1	0	N/A	3rd
2003	JGTC - GT300	R&D Sports	4	0	0	0	0	0	NC
2003	Formula BMW Asia	Team Yellow Hat	14	0	0	0	5	139	3rd
2004	Le Mans Endurance Series - GT	T2M Motorsport	1	0	0	0	0	0	NC
2005	British Formula 3 International Series	Carlin Motorsport	22	0	0	0	0	12	17th
2005	Masters of Formula 3	Carlin Motorsport	1	0	0	0	0	N/A	25th
2006	British Formula 3 International Series	Carlin Motorsport	22	0	0	0	0	4	17th
2008	Aston Martin Asia Cup		1	0	0	0	0	0	N/A†
2009	Formula Le Mans Cup	Exagon Engineering	1	0	0	0	0	1	49th
2012	FIA World Endurance Championship - LMP2	Gulf Racing Middle East	8	0	0	0	0	?	?
2012	24 Hours of Le Mans - LMP2	Gulf Racing Middle East	1	0	0	0	0	N/A	DNF
2013	FIA World Endurance Championship - LMP2	Gulf Racing Middle East	2	0	0	0	0	35	10th
2013	FIA World Endurance Championship - LMP2	OAK Racing	4	0	0	0	0	35	10th
2013	24 Hours of Le Mans - LMP2	Gulf Racing Middle East	1	0	0	0	0	N/A	DNF
2014	Asian Le Mans Series - LMP2	OAK Racing Team Total	1	1	0	0	1	25	5th
2014	European Le Mans Series - LMP2	Larbre Compétition	1	0	0	0	0	2	26th
2014	24 Hours of Le Mans - LMP2	Larbre Compétition	1	0	0	0	0	N/A	9th
2016	IMSA SportsCar Championship - Prototype	Mazda Motorsports	1	0	0	0	0	24	32nd
2017–18	Asian Le Mans Series - LMP2	Eurasia Motorsport	1	0	0	0	0	12	10th
2018–19	FIA World Endurance Championship - LMP2	Larbre Compétition	1	0	0	0	0	10	18th

^{*} Season still in progress. † – Charity race guest.

=== 24 Hours of Le Mans results ===
Year	Team	Co-Drivers	Car	Class	Laps	Pos.	Class Pos.
2012	(United Arab Emirates) Gulf Racing Middle East	(Switzerland) Jean-Denis Délétraz (France) Marc Rostan	Lola B12/80-Nissan	LMP2	17	DNF	DNF
2013	(United Arab Emirates) Gulf Racing Middle East	(France) Fabien Giroix (France) Philippe Haezebrouck	Lola B12/80-Nissan	LMP2	22	DNF	DNF
2014	(France) Larbre Compétition	(France) Pierre Ragues (United States) Ricky Taylor	Morgan LMP2-Judd	LMP2	341	14th	9th

=== Complete FIA World Endurance Championship results ===
Year	Entrant	Class	Car	Engine	Tyres	1	2	3	4	5	6	7	8	Rank	Points
2012	Gulf Racing Middle East	LMP2	Lola B12/80	Nissan VK45DE 4.5 L V8	D	SEB; EX	SPA; 9	LMS; Ret	SIL; 11	SÃO; 9	BHR; Ret	FUJ; 6	SHA; Ret	70th	2
2013	Gulf Racing Middle East	LMP2	Lola B12/80	Nissan VK45DE 4.5 L V8	D	SIL	SPA; 9	LMS; Ret						22nd	12
2013	OAK Racing	LMP2	Morgan LMP2	Nissan VK45DE 4.5 L V8	D				SÃO; 5	COA	FUJ; 9	SHA; 6	BHR; 5	22nd	12
2014	Larbre Compétition	LMP2	Morgan LMP2	Judd HK 3.6 L V8	M	SIL	SPA	LMS; 9						N/A	N/A
2014	OAK Racing	LMP2	Morgan LMP2	Judd HK 3.6 L V8	D				COA	FUJ; 3	SHA	BHR; 3	SÃO	N/A	N/A
2018–19	Larbre Compétition	LMP2	Ligier JS P217	Gibson GK428 4.2 L V8	M	SPA	LMS	SIL	FUJ; 5	SHA	SEB	SPA	LMS	18th	10

=== IMSA WeatherTech SportsCar Championship series results ===
Year	Team	Class	Make	Engine	1	2	3	4	5	6	7	8	9	10	Rank	Points
2016	Mazda Motorsports	P	Mazda Prototype	Mazda MZ-2.0T 2.0 L I4 Turbo	DAY	SIR; 8	LBH	LAG	DET	WAT	MSP	ELK	COA	PET	32nd	24

* Season still in progress
