= Carlos Hank Guerreiro =

Mexican equestrian (born 2000)

Carlos Hank

Personal information
- Full name: Carlos Hank Guerreiro
- Discipline: Show jumping
- Born: 28 June 2000 (age 26); Miguel Hidalgo, Mexico City, Mexico

Carlos Hank Guerreiro (born 28 June 2000 in Miguel Hidalgo, Mexico City, Mexico) is a Mexican Olympic equestrian. He competed in the team jumping event at the 2024 Summer Olympics.

He is the son of Carlos Hank Gonzalez and grandson of Carlos Hank Rhon.
