= 2013 FIA World Endurance Championship =

Auto racing series

- Organizer: Fédération Internationale de l'Automobile; Automobile Club de l'Ouest
- Discipline: Sports car endurance racing
- Races: 8

Champions
- LMP1 Manufacturer: (Germany) Audi
- GTE Manufacturer: (Italy) Ferrari
- LMP1 Team: (Switzerland) Rebellion Racing
- LMP2 Team: (France) OAK Racing
- LMGTE Pro Team: (Italy) AF Corse
- LMGTE Am Team: (United States) 8 Star Motorsports

FIA World Endurance Championship
- ← 2012 2014 →

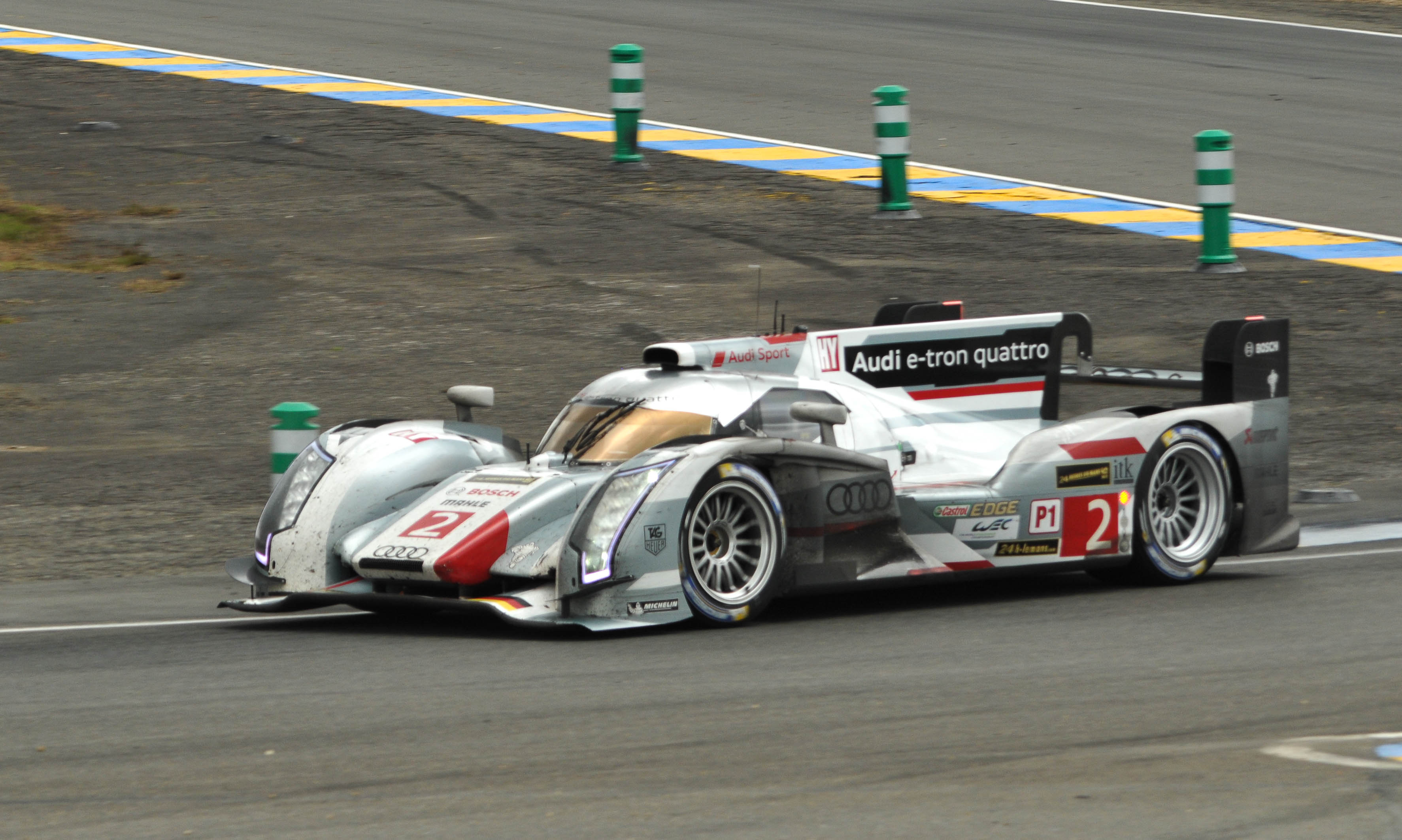
Audi won the 2013 FIA World Endurance Championship for Manufacturers

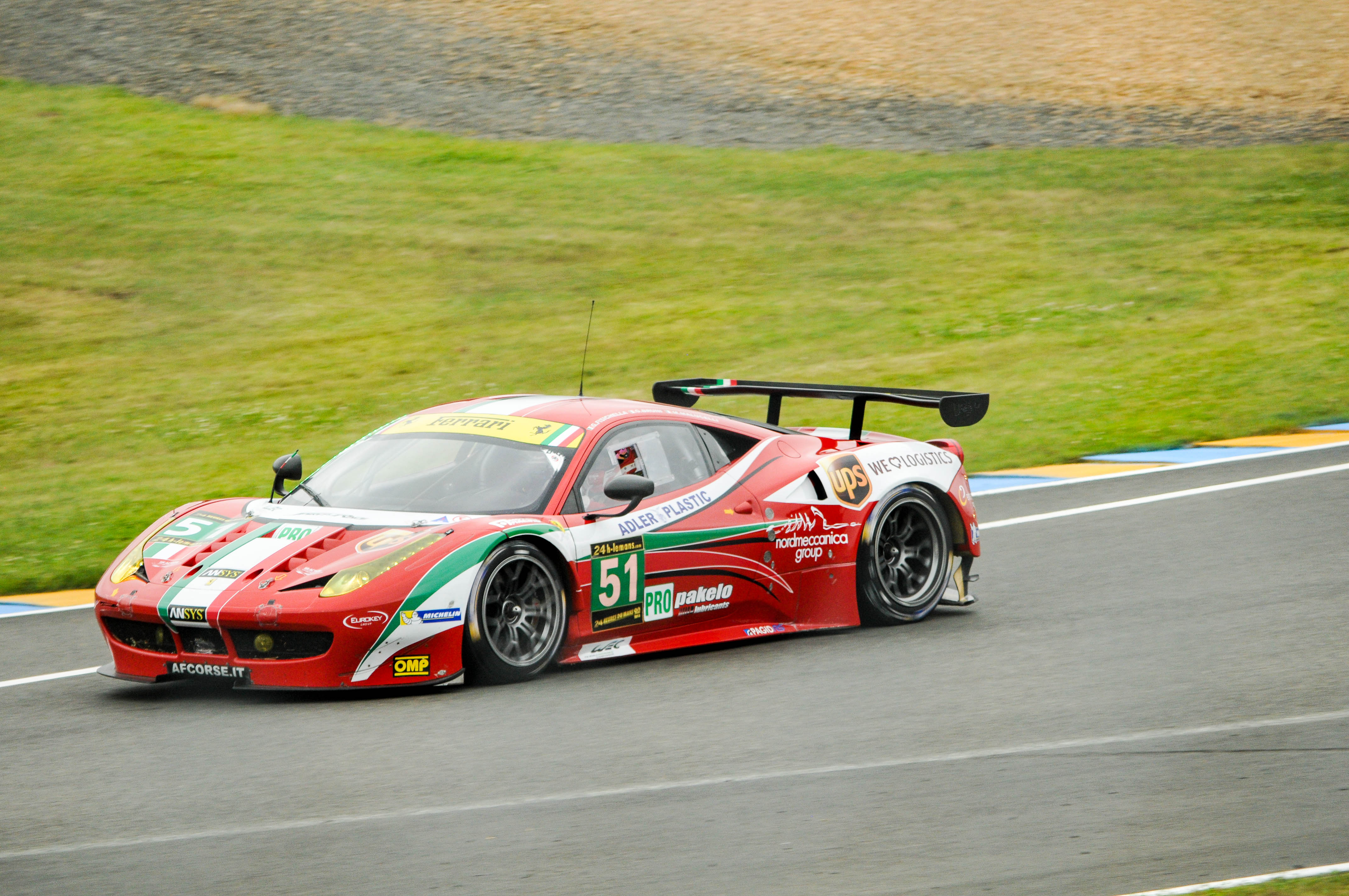
Ferrari won the 2013 FIA World Endurance Cup for GT Manufacturers

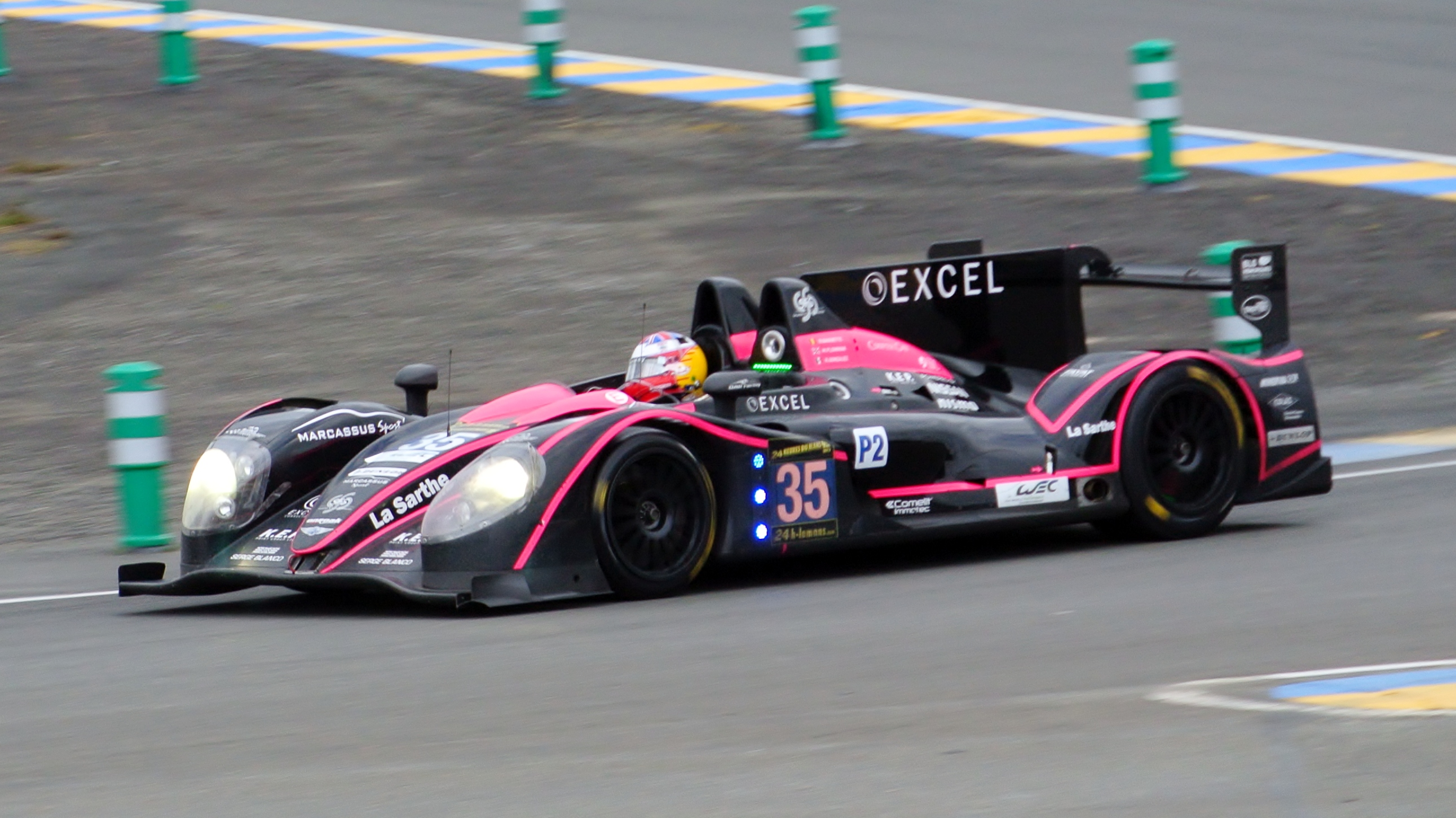
OAK Racing won the 2013 FIA Endurance Trophy for LMP2 Teams

The 2013 FIA World Endurance Championship season was the second season of the FIA World Endurance Championship auto racing series, co-organized by the Fédération Internationale de l'Automobile (FIA) and the Automobile Club de l'Ouest (ACO). The series was open to Le Mans Prototypes and grand tourer-style racing cars meeting four ACO categories. World Championships were awarded to drivers and to LMP1 category manufacturers, and several World Cups and Endurance Trophies were awarded for the series' other categories. The eight race championship began in April at the Silverstone Circuit and ended in November at the Bahrain International Circuit. The season was marred by the death of Allan Simonsen in the 24 Hours of Le Mans.

== Calendar ==
An initial calendar was published by the FIA World Motor Sport Council on 28 September 2012. Seven of the eight races on the schedule are carried over from 2012, although several events have had their dates changed. The 6 Hours of Silverstone now begins the season in April before Spa in May and the 24 Hours of Le Mans in June. In order to save costs and utilize shipping by sea instead of air, the non-European events have all been grouped at the end of the season. São Paulo remains as the first post-European event, while the new 6 Hours of Circuit of the Americas replaces the 12 Hours of Sebring as the American round of the series. Fuji and Shanghai are moved forward on the calendar, leaving Bahrain to now close the season in November, allowing cooler temperatures than its September date in 2012.

The Silverstone race weekend was shared with the European Le Mans Series, while the Austin weekend was held in conjunction with the American Le Mans Series, although unlike the 2012 12 Hours of Sebring, both series ran separate races.

Rnd	Race	Circuit	Location	Date
	Prologue	Circuit Paul Ricard	(France) Le Castellet, Var	29/30 March
1	6 Hours of Silverstone	Silverstone Circuit	(United Kingdom) Silverstone	14 April
2	WEC 6 Heures de Spa-Francorchamps	Circuit de Spa-Francorchamps	(Belgium) Stavelot	4 May
3	24 Heures du Mans	Circuit de la Sarthe	(France) Le Mans	22–23 June
4	6 Hours of São Paulo	Autódromo José Carlos Pace	(Brazil) São Paulo	1 September
5	6 Hours of Circuit of the Americas	Circuit of the Americas	(United States) Austin, Texas	22 September
6	6 Hours of Fuji	Fuji Speedway	(Japan) Oyama, Shizuoka	20 October
7	6 Hours of Shanghai	Shanghai International Circuit	(China) Shanghai	9 November
8	6 Hours of Bahrain	Bahrain International Circuit	(Bahrain) Sakhir	30 November

== Regulation changes ==
An additional World Cup was awarded for the 2013 season, with drivers in both LMGTE categories having a unified championship. Further, the LMP2 and LMGTE Am categories had FIA Endurance Trophies awarded for their drivers. The qualifying format of the race weekend was also changed, with teams requiring two drivers each to set two timed laps. The qualifying results were determined based on an average of the four total laps. The new qualifying format has been met with much criticism from drivers. The pre-race warm-up session has also been eliminated from the series, except in instances where extra practice may be necessary.

The LMP2 category saw several rule changes in order to lower costs, including the issuing of balance of performance updates during the course of the season. A limit was also set on the price of upgrade kits for 2012 cars for teams not purchasing 2013 chassis, while the number of engines and tyres they can utilize over the course of the season have been restricted. Diesel engines were allowed in the LMP2 category for the first time. Limits on tyres were also set in the LMGTE Am category.

== Entries ==
The World Endurance Championship received entries in four classes, including Le Mans Prototype 1 (LMP1), Le Mans Prototype 2 (LMP2), Le Mans Grand Touring Endurance — Professional (LMGTE Pro) and Le Mans Grand Touring Endurance — Amateur (LMGTE Am). The entry list for the 2013 season was released by the Automobile Club de l'Ouest on 1 February, and included six LMP1 and twelve LMP2 cars, six LMGTE Pro entries, and eight LMGTE Am cars, bringing the full grid up to thirty-two entrants. Two LMP2 teams, Starworks Motorsport and HVM Status GP later withdrew their full-season entries citing a lack of funding.

=== LMP1 ===
Entrant/Team	Car	Engine	Tyre	No.	Drivers	Rounds
(Germany) Audi Sport Team Joest	Audi R18 e-tron quattro	Audi TDI 3.7 L Turbo V6 (Hybrid Diesel)	M	1	(Germany) André Lotterer	All
(Germany) Audi Sport Team Joest	Audi R18 e-tron quattro	Audi TDI 3.7 L Turbo V6 (Hybrid Diesel)	M	1	(France) Benoît Tréluyer	All
(Germany) Audi Sport Team Joest	Audi R18 e-tron quattro	Audi TDI 3.7 L Turbo V6 (Hybrid Diesel)	M	1	(Switzerland) Marcel Fässler	All
(Germany) Audi Sport Team Joest	Audi R18 e-tron quattro	Audi TDI 3.7 L Turbo V6 (Hybrid Diesel)	M	2	(Denmark) Tom Kristensen	All
(Germany) Audi Sport Team Joest	Audi R18 e-tron quattro	Audi TDI 3.7 L Turbo V6 (Hybrid Diesel)	M	2	(United Kingdom) Allan McNish	All
(Germany) Audi Sport Team Joest	Audi R18 e-tron quattro	Audi TDI 3.7 L Turbo V6 (Hybrid Diesel)	M	2	(France) Loïc Duval	All
(Germany) Audi Sport Team Joest	Audi R18 e-tron quattro	Audi TDI 3.7 L Turbo V6 (Hybrid Diesel)	M	3	(Spain) Marc Gené	2–3
(Germany) Audi Sport Team Joest	Audi R18 e-tron quattro	Audi TDI 3.7 L Turbo V6 (Hybrid Diesel)	M	3	(United Kingdom) Oliver Jarvis	2–3
(Germany) Audi Sport Team Joest	Audi R18 e-tron quattro	Audi TDI 3.7 L Turbo V6 (Hybrid Diesel)	M	3	(Brazil) Lucas di Grassi	2–3
(Japan) Toyota Racing	Toyota TS030 Hybrid	Toyota RV8KLM 3.4 L V8 (Hybrid)	M	7	(Austria) Alexander Wurz	1–3, 6–8
(Japan) Toyota Racing	Toyota TS030 Hybrid	Toyota RV8KLM 3.4 L V8 (Hybrid)	M	7	(France) Nicolas Lapierre	1–3, 6–8
(Japan) Toyota Racing	Toyota TS030 Hybrid	Toyota RV8KLM 3.4 L V8 (Hybrid)	M	7	(Japan) Kazuki Nakajima	2–3, 6, 8
(Japan) Toyota Racing	Toyota TS030 Hybrid	Toyota RV8KLM 3.4 L V8 (Hybrid)	M	8	(United Kingdom) Anthony Davidson	All
(Japan) Toyota Racing	Toyota TS030 Hybrid	Toyota RV8KLM 3.4 L V8 (Hybrid)	M	8	(Switzerland) Sébastien Buemi	All
(Japan) Toyota Racing	Toyota TS030 Hybrid	Toyota RV8KLM 3.4 L V8 (Hybrid)	M	8	(France) Stéphane Sarrazin	All
(Switzerland) Rebellion Racing	Lola B12/60	Toyota RV8KLM 3.4 L V8	M	12	(France) Nicolas Prost	1–5, 7–8
(Switzerland) Rebellion Racing	Lola B12/60	Toyota RV8KLM 3.4 L V8	M	12	(Germany) Nick Heidfeld	1–5
(Switzerland) Rebellion Racing	Lola B12/60	Toyota RV8KLM 3.4 L V8	M	12	(Switzerland) Neel Jani	1–3
(Switzerland) Rebellion Racing	Lola B12/60	Toyota RV8KLM 3.4 L V8	M	12	(Switzerland) Mathias Beche	4–8
(Switzerland) Rebellion Racing	Lola B12/60	Toyota RV8KLM 3.4 L V8	M	12	(Italy) Andrea Belicchi	6–8
(Switzerland) Rebellion Racing	Lola B12/60	Toyota RV8KLM 3.4 L V8	M	13	(Italy) Andrea Belicchi	1–3
(Switzerland) Rebellion Racing	Lola B12/60	Toyota RV8KLM 3.4 L V8	M	13	(Switzerland) Mathias Beche	1–3
(Switzerland) Rebellion Racing	Lola B12/60	Toyota RV8KLM 3.4 L V8	M	13	(China) Congfu Cheng	1–3
(United Kingdom) Strakka Racing	HPD ARX-03c	Honda LM-V8 3.4 L V8	M	21	(United Kingdom) Nick Leventis	1–3
(United Kingdom) Strakka Racing	HPD ARX-03c	Honda LM-V8 3.4 L V8	M	21	(United Kingdom) Danny Watts	1–3
(United Kingdom) Strakka Racing	HPD ARX-03c	Honda LM-V8 3.4 L V8	M	21	(United Kingdom) Jonny Kane	1–3

Key
Full-season entry
* Eligible for all championship points
Additional entry
* Eligible only for Drivers' championship points
Third manufacturer entry
* Eligible for Drivers' championship points
* Only eligible for Manufacturers' championship points at Le Mans

=== LMP2 ===
Entrant/Team	Car	Engine	Tyre	No.	Drivers	Rounds
(France) OAK Racing	Morgan LMP2	Nissan VK45DE 4.5 L V8	D	24	(France) Olivier Pla	All
(France) OAK Racing	Morgan LMP2	Nissan VK45DE 4.5 L V8	D	24	(United Kingdom) Alex Brundle	All
(France) OAK Racing	Morgan LMP2	Nissan VK45DE 4.5 L V8	D	24	(Denmark) David Heinemeier Hansson	All
(France) OAK Racing	Morgan LMP2	Nissan VK45DE 4.5 L V8	D	35	(Belgium) Bertrand Baguette	All
(France) OAK Racing	Morgan LMP2	Nissan VK45DE 4.5 L V8	D	35	(United Kingdom) Martin Plowman	All
(France) OAK Racing	Morgan LMP2	Nissan VK45DE 4.5 L V8	D	35	(Mexico) Ricardo González	All
(France) OAK Racing	Morgan LMP2	Nissan VK45DE 4.5 L V8	D	45	(France) Jacques Nicolet	All
(France) OAK Racing	Morgan LMP2	Nissan VK45DE 4.5 L V8	D	45	(France) Jean-Marc Merlin	1–5
(France) OAK Racing	Morgan LMP2	Nissan VK45DE 4.5 L V8	D	45	(France) Philippe Mondolot	3
(France) OAK Racing	Morgan LMP2	Nissan VK45DE 4.5 L V8	D	45	(Japan) Keiko Ihara	4, 6–8
(France) OAK Racing	Morgan LMP2	Nissan VK45DE 4.5 L V8	D	45	(France) Erik Maris	5
(France) OAK Racing	Morgan LMP2	Nissan VK45DE 4.5 L V8	D	45	(United States) David Cheng	7–8
(United Kingdom) Delta-ADR	Oreca 03	Nissan VK45DE 4.5 L V8	D	25	(Thailand) Tor Graves	1–7
(United Kingdom) Delta-ADR	Oreca 03	Nissan VK45DE 4.5 L V8	D	25	(United Kingdom) James Walker	1–2, 4–6
(United Kingdom) Delta-ADR	Oreca 03	Nissan VK45DE 4.5 L V8	D	25	(Brazil) Antônio Pizzonia	1–2
(United Kingdom) Delta-ADR	Oreca 03	Nissan VK45DE 4.5 L V8	D	25	(United Kingdom) Archie Hamilton	3
(United Kingdom) Delta-ADR	Oreca 03	Nissan VK45DE 4.5 L V8	D	25	(Japan) Shinji Nakano	3, 6
(United Kingdom) Delta-ADR	Oreca 03	Nissan VK45DE 4.5 L V8	D	25	(United Kingdom) Robbie Kerr	4, 7–8
(United Kingdom) Delta-ADR	Oreca 03	Nissan VK45DE 4.5 L V8	D	25	(Mexico) Rudy Junco	5
(United Kingdom) Delta-ADR	Oreca 03	Nissan VK45DE 4.5 L V8	D	25	(United Kingdom) Craig Dolby	7–8
(United Kingdom) Delta-ADR	Oreca 03	Nissan VK45DE 4.5 L V8	D	25	(France) Fabien Giroix	8
(Russia) G-Drive Racing	Oreca 03	Nissan VK45DE 4.5 L V8	D	26	(Russia) Roman Rusinov	All
(Russia) G-Drive Racing	Oreca 03	Nissan VK45DE 4.5 L V8	D	26	(United Kingdom) Mike Conway	All
(Russia) G-Drive Racing	Oreca 03	Nissan VK45DE 4.5 L V8	D	26	(Australia) John Martin	All
(United Arab Emirates) Gulf Racing Middle East	Lola B12/80	Nissan VK45DE 4.5 L V8	D	28	(France) Fabien Giroix	2–3
(United Arab Emirates) Gulf Racing Middle East	Lola B12/80	Nissan VK45DE 4.5 L V8	D	28	(Japan) Keiko Ihara	2–3
(United Arab Emirates) Gulf Racing Middle East	Lola B12/80	Nissan VK45DE 4.5 L V8	D	28	(Ivory Coast) Frédéric Fatien	2
(United Arab Emirates) Gulf Racing Middle East	Lola B12/80	Nissan VK45DE 4.5 L V8	D	28	(France) Philippe Haezebrouck	3
(Czech Republic) Lotus	Lotus T128	Praga (Judd) 3.6 L V8	D	31	(United States) Kevin Weeda	All
(Czech Republic) Lotus	Lotus T128	Praga (Judd) 3.6 L V8	D	31	(Italy) Vitantonio Liuzzi	1–2, 5–8
(Czech Republic) Lotus	Lotus T128	Praga (Judd) 3.6 L V8	D	31	(France) Christophe Bouchut	1, 3–4, 7
(Czech Republic) Lotus	Lotus T128	Praga (Judd) 3.6 L V8	D	31	(United Kingdom) James Rossiter	2–3, 5–6
(Czech Republic) Lotus	Lotus T128	Praga (Judd) 3.6 L V8	D	31	(Austria) Lucas Auer	8
(Czech Republic) Lotus	Lotus T128	Praga (Judd) 3.6 L V8	D	32	(Germany) Thomas Holzer	All
(Czech Republic) Lotus	Lotus T128	Praga (Judd) 3.6 L V8	D	32	(Austria) Dominik Kraihamer	All
(Czech Republic) Lotus	Lotus T128	Praga (Judd) 3.6 L V8	D	32	(Czech Republic) Jan Charouz	All
(United Kingdom) Greaves Motorsport	Zytek Z11SN	Nissan VK45DE 4.5 L V8	D	41	(United States) Chris Dyson	1–2, 5
(United Kingdom) Greaves Motorsport	Zytek Z11SN	Nissan VK45DE 4.5 L V8	D	41	(United States) Michael Marsal	1–2
(United Kingdom) Greaves Motorsport	Zytek Z11SN	Nissan VK45DE 4.5 L V8	D	41	(United Kingdom) Tom Kimber-Smith	1–3, 5
(United Kingdom) Greaves Motorsport	Zytek Z11SN	Nissan VK45DE 4.5 L V8	D	41	(United States) Alexander Rossi	3
(United Kingdom) Greaves Motorsport	Zytek Z11SN	Nissan VK45DE 4.5 L V8	D	41	(United States) Eric Lux	3, 7
(United Kingdom) Greaves Motorsport	Zytek Z11SN	Nissan VK45DE 4.5 L V8	D	41	(Germany) Christian Zugel	4–5
(United Kingdom) Greaves Motorsport	Zytek Z11SN	Nissan VK45DE 4.5 L V8	D	41	(United States) Gunnar Jeannette	4
(United Kingdom) Greaves Motorsport	Zytek Z11SN	Nissan VK45DE 4.5 L V8	D	41	(Sweden) Björn Wirdheim	4, 7–8
(United Kingdom) Greaves Motorsport	Zytek Z11SN	Nissan VK45DE 4.5 L V8	D	41	(Russia) Mark Shulzhitskiy	7
(United Kingdom) Greaves Motorsport	Zytek Z11SN	Nissan VK45DE 4.5 L V8	D	41	(Belgium) Wolfgang Reip	8
(United Kingdom) Greaves Motorsport	Zytek Z11SN	Nissan VK45DE 4.5 L V8	D	41	(United Kingdom) Jon Lancaster	8
(United Kingdom) Greaves Motorsport	Zytek Z11SN	Nissan VK45DE 4.5 L V8	D	42	(Germany) Michael Krumm	3
(United Kingdom) Greaves Motorsport	Zytek Z11SN	Nissan VK45DE 4.5 L V8	D	42	(United Kingdom) Jann Mardenborough	3
(United Kingdom) Greaves Motorsport	Zytek Z11SN	Nissan VK45DE 4.5 L V8	D	42	(Spain) Lucas Ordóñez	3
(Argentina) Pecom Racing	Oreca 03	Nissan VK45DE 4.5 L V8	M	49	(Argentina) Luis Pérez Companc	All
(Argentina) Pecom Racing	Oreca 03	Nissan VK45DE 4.5 L V8	M	49	(Germany) Pierre Kaffer	All
(Argentina) Pecom Racing	Oreca 03	Nissan VK45DE 4.5 L V8	M	49	(France) Nicolas Minassian	All

=== LMGTE Pro ===
Entrant/Team	Car	Engine	Tyre	No.	Drivers	Rounds
(Italy) AF Corse	Ferrari 458 Italia GT2	Ferrari F136 4.5 L V8	M	51	(Italy) Gianmaria Bruni	All
(Italy) AF Corse	Ferrari 458 Italia GT2	Ferrari F136 4.5 L V8	M	51	(Italy) Giancarlo Fisichella	1–7
(Italy) AF Corse	Ferrari 458 Italia GT2	Ferrari F136 4.5 L V8	M	51	(Italy) Matteo Malucelli	3
(Italy) AF Corse	Ferrari 458 Italia GT2	Ferrari F136 4.5 L V8	M	51	(Finland) Toni Vilander	8
(Italy) AF Corse	Ferrari 458 Italia GT2	Ferrari F136 4.5 L V8	M	71	(Japan) Kamui Kobayashi	All
(Italy) AF Corse	Ferrari 458 Italia GT2	Ferrari F136 4.5 L V8	M	71	(Finland) Toni Vilander	1–7
(Italy) AF Corse	Ferrari 458 Italia GT2	Ferrari F136 4.5 L V8	M	71	(Monaco) Olivier Beretta	3
(Italy) AF Corse	Ferrari 458 Italia GT2	Ferrari F136 4.5 L V8	M	71	(Italy) Giancarlo Fisichella	8
(Germany) Porsche AG Team Manthey	Porsche 911 RSR	Porsche M97/80 4.0 L Flat-6	M	91	(Germany) Jörg Bergmeister	All
(Germany) Porsche AG Team Manthey	Porsche 911 RSR	Porsche M97/80 4.0 L Flat-6	M	91	(France) Patrick Pilet	All
(Germany) Porsche AG Team Manthey	Porsche 911 RSR	Porsche M97/80 4.0 L Flat-6	M	91	(Germany) Timo Bernhard	1–3
(Germany) Porsche AG Team Manthey	Porsche 911 RSR	Porsche M97/80 4.0 L Flat-6	M	92	(Germany) Marc Lieb	All
(Germany) Porsche AG Team Manthey	Porsche 911 RSR	Porsche M97/80 4.0 L Flat-6	M	92	(Austria) Richard Lietz	All
(Germany) Porsche AG Team Manthey	Porsche 911 RSR	Porsche M97/80 4.0 L Flat-6	M	92	(France) Romain Dumas	1–3
(United Kingdom) Aston Martin Racing	Aston Martin Vantage GTE	Aston Martin AM05 4.5 L V8	M	97	(United Kingdom) Darren Turner	All
(United Kingdom) Aston Martin Racing	Aston Martin Vantage GTE	Aston Martin AM05 4.5 L V8	M	97	(Germany) Stefan Mücke	All
(United Kingdom) Aston Martin Racing	Aston Martin Vantage GTE	Aston Martin AM05 4.5 L V8	M	97	(Brazil) Bruno Senna	1
(United Kingdom) Aston Martin Racing	Aston Martin Vantage GTE	Aston Martin AM05 4.5 L V8	M	97	(United Kingdom) Peter Dumbreck	2–3
(United Kingdom) Aston Martin Racing	Aston Martin Vantage GTE	Aston Martin AM05 4.5 L V8	M	97	(United Kingdom) Oliver Gavin	5
(United Kingdom) Aston Martin Racing	Aston Martin Vantage GTE	Aston Martin AM05 4.5 L V8	M	97	(France) Frédéric Makowiecki	6
(United Kingdom) Aston Martin Racing	Aston Martin Vantage GTE	Aston Martin AM05 4.5 L V8	M	98	(Brazil) Bruno Senna	2
(United Kingdom) Aston Martin Racing	Aston Martin Vantage GTE	Aston Martin AM05 4.5 L V8	M	98	(France) Frédéric Makowiecki	2
(United Kingdom) Aston Martin Racing	Aston Martin Vantage GTE	Aston Martin AM05 4.5 L V8	M	98	(United Kingdom) Rob Bell	2
(United Kingdom) Aston Martin Racing	Aston Martin Vantage GTE	Aston Martin AM05 4.5 L V8	M	98	(United States) Bill Auberlen	3
(United Kingdom) Aston Martin Racing	Aston Martin Vantage GTE	Aston Martin AM05 4.5 L V8	M	98	(Canada) Paul Dalla Lana	3–5
(United Kingdom) Aston Martin Racing	Aston Martin Vantage GTE	Aston Martin AM05 4.5 L V8	M	98	(Portugal) Pedro Lamy	3–5
(United Kingdom) Aston Martin Racing	Aston Martin Vantage GTE	Aston Martin AM05 4.5 L V8	M	98	(New Zealand) Richie Stanaway	4–5
(United Kingdom) Aston Martin Racing	Aston Martin Vantage GTE	Aston Martin AM05 4.5 L V8	M	99	(Canada) Paul Dalla Lana	1–2
(United Kingdom) Aston Martin Racing	Aston Martin Vantage GTE	Aston Martin AM05 4.5 L V8	M	99	(Portugal) Pedro Lamy	1–2, 6–8
(United Kingdom) Aston Martin Racing	Aston Martin Vantage GTE	Aston Martin AM05 4.5 L V8	M	99	(France) Frédéric Makowiecki	1, 3, 5
(United Kingdom) Aston Martin Racing	Aston Martin Vantage GTE	Aston Martin AM05 4.5 L V8	M	99	(New Zealand) Richie Stanaway	2, 6–8
(United Kingdom) Aston Martin Racing	Aston Martin Vantage GTE	Aston Martin AM05 4.5 L V8	M	99	(United Kingdom) Rob Bell	3–4
(United Kingdom) Aston Martin Racing	Aston Martin Vantage GTE	Aston Martin AM05 4.5 L V8	M	99	(Brazil) Bruno Senna	3–5, 7–8

=== LMGTE Am ===
Entrant/Team	Car	Engine	Tyre	No.	Drivers	Rounds
(France) Larbre Compétition	Chevrolet Corvette C6.R	Chevrolet LS5.5R 5.5 L V8	M	50	(France) Patrick Bornhauser	All
(France) Larbre Compétition	Chevrolet Corvette C6.R	Chevrolet LS5.5R 5.5 L V8	M	50	(France) Julien Canal	All
(France) Larbre Compétition	Chevrolet Corvette C6.R	Chevrolet LS5.5R 5.5 L V8	M	50	(Brazil) Fernando Rees	1–2, 4–8
(France) Larbre Compétition	Chevrolet Corvette C6.R	Chevrolet LS5.5R 5.5 L V8	M	50	(United States) Ricky Taylor	3
(France) Larbre Compétition	Chevrolet Corvette C6.R	Chevrolet LS5.5R 5.5 L V8	M	70	(United States) Cooper MacNeil	3
(France) Larbre Compétition	Chevrolet Corvette C6.R	Chevrolet LS5.5R 5.5 L V8	M	70	(France) Manuel Rodrigues	3
(France) Larbre Compétition	Chevrolet Corvette C6.R	Chevrolet LS5.5R 5.5 L V8	M	70	(France) Philippe Dumas	3
(Italy) AF Corse	Ferrari 458 Italia GT2	Ferrari F136 4.5 L V8	M	54	(France) Yannick Mallégol	2–3
(Italy) AF Corse	Ferrari 458 Italia GT2	Ferrari F136 4.5 L V8	M	54	(France) Jean-Marc Bachelier	2–3
(Italy) AF Corse	Ferrari 458 Italia GT2	Ferrari F136 4.5 L V8	M	54	(United States) Howard Blank	2–3
(Italy) AF Corse	Ferrari 458 Italia GT2	Ferrari F136 4.5 L V8	M	55	(Italy) Piergiuseppe Perazzini	3
(Italy) AF Corse	Ferrari 458 Italia GT2	Ferrari F136 4.5 L V8	M	55	(Italy) Lorenzo Casè	3
(Italy) AF Corse	Ferrari 458 Italia GT2	Ferrari F136 4.5 L V8	M	55	(Hong Kong) Darryl O'Young	3
(Italy) AF Corse	Ferrari 458 Italia GT2	Ferrari F136 4.5 L V8	M	61	(South Africa) Jack Gerber	1–7
(Italy) AF Corse	Ferrari 458 Italia GT2	Ferrari F136 4.5 L V8	M	61	(Republic of Ireland) Matt Griffin	All
(Italy) AF Corse	Ferrari 458 Italia GT2	Ferrari F136 4.5 L V8	M	61	(Italy) Marco Cioci	1–7
(Italy) AF Corse	Ferrari 458 Italia GT2	Ferrari F136 4.5 L V8	M	61	(France) François Perrodo	8
(Italy) AF Corse	Ferrari 458 Italia GT2	Ferrari F136 4.5 L V8	M	61	(France) Emmanuel Collard	8
(United States) Krohn Racing	Ferrari 458 Italia GT2	Ferrari F136 4.5 L V8	M	57	(United States) Tracy Krohn	All
(United States) Krohn Racing	Ferrari 458 Italia GT2	Ferrari F136 4.5 L V8	M	57	(Sweden) Niclas Jönsson	All
(United States) Krohn Racing	Ferrari 458 Italia GT2	Ferrari F136 4.5 L V8	M	57	(Italy) Maurizio Mediani	All
(France) IMSA Performance Matmut	Porsche 997 GT3-RSR	Porsche M97/74 4.0 L Flat-6	M	67	(France) Pascal Gibon	3
(France) IMSA Performance Matmut	Porsche 997 GT3-RSR	Porsche M97/74 4.0 L Flat-6	M	67	(France) Patrice Milesi	3
(France) IMSA Performance Matmut	Porsche 997 GT3-RSR	Porsche M97/74 4.0 L Flat-6	M	67	(Germany) Wolf Henzler	3
(France) IMSA Performance Matmut	Porsche 997 GT3-RSR	Porsche M97/74 4.0 L Flat-6	M	76	(France) Raymond Narac	All
(France) IMSA Performance Matmut	Porsche 997 GT3-RSR	Porsche M97/74 4.0 L Flat-6	M	76	(France) Jean-Karl Vernay	All
(France) IMSA Performance Matmut	Porsche 997 GT3-RSR	Porsche M97/74 4.0 L Flat-6	M	76	(France) Christophe Bourret	1, 3–4
(France) IMSA Performance Matmut	Porsche 997 GT3-RSR	Porsche M97/74 4.0 L Flat-6	M	76	(Finland) Markus Palttala	6–8
(United States) 8 Star Motorsports	Ferrari 458 Italia GT2	Ferrari F136 4.5 L V8	M	81	(Venezuela) Enzo Potolicchio	All
(United States) 8 Star Motorsports	Ferrari 458 Italia GT2	Ferrari F136 4.5 L V8	M	81	(Portugal) Rui Águas	All
(United States) 8 Star Motorsports	Ferrari 458 Italia GT2	Ferrari F136 4.5 L V8	M	81	(Austria) Philipp Peter	1
(United States) 8 Star Motorsports	Ferrari 458 Italia GT2	Ferrari F136 4.5 L V8	M	81	(Italy) Matteo Malucelli	2, 5
(United States) 8 Star Motorsports	Ferrari 458 Italia GT2	Ferrari F136 4.5 L V8	M	81	(Australia) Jason Bright	3
(United States) 8 Star Motorsports	Ferrari 458 Italia GT2	Ferrari F136 4.5 L V8	M	81	(Italy) Davide Rigon	4, 6–8
(Germany) Proton Competition	Porsche 997 GT3-RSR	Porsche M97/74 4.0 L Flat-6	M	88	(Germany) Christian Ried	All
(Germany) Proton Competition	Porsche 997 GT3-RSR	Porsche M97/74 4.0 L Flat-6	M	88	(Italy) Gianluca Roda	All
(Germany) Proton Competition	Porsche 997 GT3-RSR	Porsche M97/74 4.0 L Flat-6	M	88	(Italy) Paolo Ruberti	All
(United Kingdom) Aston Martin Racing	Aston Martin Vantage GTE	Aston Martin AM05 4.5 L V8	M	95	(Denmark) Christoffer Nygaard	All
(United Kingdom) Aston Martin Racing	Aston Martin Vantage GTE	Aston Martin AM05 4.5 L V8	M	95	(Denmark) Kristian Poulsen	All
(United Kingdom) Aston Martin Racing	Aston Martin Vantage GTE	Aston Martin AM05 4.5 L V8	M	95	(Denmark) Allan Simonsen	1–3
(United Kingdom) Aston Martin Racing	Aston Martin Vantage GTE	Aston Martin AM05 4.5 L V8	M	95	(Denmark) Nicki Thiim	4–5, 7–8
(United Kingdom) Aston Martin Racing	Aston Martin Vantage GTE	Aston Martin AM05 4.5 L V8	M	95	(Brazil) Bruno Senna	6
(United Kingdom) Aston Martin Racing	Aston Martin Vantage GTE	Aston Martin AM05 4.5 L V8	M	96	(United Kingdom) Jamie Campbell-Walter	All
(United Kingdom) Aston Martin Racing	Aston Martin Vantage GTE	Aston Martin AM05 4.5 L V8	M	96	(United Kingdom) Stuart Hall	All
(United Kingdom) Aston Martin Racing	Aston Martin Vantage GTE	Aston Martin AM05 4.5 L V8	M	96	(Germany) Roald Goethe	1–3, 8
(United Kingdom) Aston Martin Racing	Aston Martin Vantage GTE	Aston Martin AM05 4.5 L V8	M	96	(United Kingdom) Jonathan Adam	6–7

== Results and standings ==
=== Race results ===
The highest finishing competitor entered in the World Endurance Championship is listed below. Invitational entries may have finished ahead of WEC competitors in individual races.

Rnd.	Circuit	LMP1 Winners	LMP2 Winners	LMGTE Pro Winners	LMGTE Am Winners	Report
1	Silverstone	(Germany) No. 2 Audi Sport Team Joest	(United Kingdom) No. 25 Delta-ADR	(United Kingdom) No. 97 Aston Martin Racing	(United Kingdom) No. 95 Aston Martin Racing	Report
1	Silverstone	(United Kingdom) Allan McNish (Denmark) Tom Kristensen (France) Loïc Duval	(Brazil) Antônio Pizzonia (Thailand) Tor Graves (United Kingdom) James Walker	(United Kingdom) Darren Turner (Germany) Stefan Mücke (Brazil) Bruno Senna	(Denmark) Allan Simonsen (Denmark) Christoffer Nygaard (Denmark) Kristian Poulsen	Report
2	Spa-Francorchamps	(Germany) No. 1 Audi Sport Team Joest	(Argentina) No. 49 PeCom Racing	(Italy) No. 51 AF Corse	(United States) No. 81 8 Star Motorsports	Report
2	Spa-Francorchamps	(Germany) André Lotterer (France) Benoît Tréluyer (Switzerland) Marcel Fässler	(Argentina) Luis Pérez Companc (Germany) Pierre Kaffer (France) Nicolas Minassian	(Italy) Gianmaria Bruni (Italy) Giancarlo Fisichella	(Venezuela) Enzo Potolicchio (Portugal) Rui Águas (Italy) Matteo Malucelli	Report
3	Le Mans	(Germany) No. 2 Audi Sport Team Joest	(France) No. 35 OAK Racing	(Germany) No. 92 Porsche AG Team Manthey	(France) No. 76 IMSA Performance Matmut	Report
3	Le Mans	(United Kingdom) Allan McNish (Denmark) Tom Kristensen (France) Loïc Duval	(Belgium) Bertrand Baguette (United Kingdom) Martin Plowman (Mexico) Ricardo González	(Germany) Marc Lieb (Austria) Richard Lietz (France) Romain Dumas	(France) Raymond Narac (France) Jean-Karl Vernay (France) Christophe Bourret	Report
4	Interlagos	(Germany) No. 1 Audi Sport Team Joest	(Russia) No. 26 G-Drive Racing	(Italy) No. 51 AF Corse	(United Kingdom) No. 96 Aston Martin Racing	Report
4	Interlagos	(Germany) André Lotterer (France) Benoît Tréluyer (Switzerland) Marcel Fässler	(Russia) Roman Rusinov (United Kingdom) Mike Conway (Australia) John Martin	(Italy) Gianmaria Bruni (Italy) Giancarlo Fisichella	(United Kingdom) Jamie Campbell-Walter (United Kingdom) Stuart Hall	Report
5	Austin	(Germany) No. 2 Audi Sport Team Joest	(Russia) No. 26 G-Drive Racing	(United Kingdom) No. 99 Aston Martin Racing	(United Kingdom) No. 96 Aston Martin Racing	Report
5	Austin	(United Kingdom) Allan McNish (Denmark) Tom Kristensen (France) Loïc Duval	(Russia) Roman Rusinov (United Kingdom) Mike Conway (Australia) John Martin	(France) Frédéric Makowiecki (Brazil) Bruno Senna	(United Kingdom) Jamie Campbell-Walter (United Kingdom) Stuart Hall	Report
6	Fuji	(Japan) No. 7 Toyota Racing	(France) No. 35 OAK Racing	(United Kingdom) No. 97 Aston Martin Racing	(United Kingdom) No. 95 Aston Martin Racing	Report
6	Fuji	(Austria) Alexander Wurz (France) Nicolas Lapierre (Japan) Kazuki Nakajima	(Belgium) Bertrand Baguette (United Kingdom) Martin Plowman (Mexico) Ricardo González	(United Kingdom) Darren Turner (Germany) Stefan Mücke (France) Frédéric Makowiecki	(Denmark) Kristian Poulsen (Denmark) Christoffer Nygaard (Brazil) Bruno Senna	Report
7	Shanghai	(Germany) No. 1 Audi Sport Team Joest	(Russia) No. 26 G-Drive Racing	(United Kingdom) No. 97 Aston Martin Racing	(United States) No. 81 8 Star Motorsports	Report
7	Shanghai	(Germany) André Lotterer (France) Benoît Tréluyer (Switzerland) Marcel Fässler	(Russia) Roman Rusinov (United Kingdom) Mike Conway (Australia) John Martin	(United Kingdom) Darren Turner (Germany) Stefan Mücke	(Venezuela) Enzo Potolicchio (Portugal) Rui Águas (Italy) Davide Rigon	Report
8	Bahrain	(Japan) No. 8 Toyota Racing	(Russia) No. 26 G-Drive Racing	(Italy) No. 51 AF Corse	(United Kingdom) No. 95 Aston Martin Racing	Report
8	Bahrain	(Switzerland) Sébastien Buemi (United Kingdom) Anthony Davidson (France) Stéphane Sarrazin	(Russia) Roman Rusinov (United Kingdom) Mike Conway (Australia) John Martin	(Italy) Gianmaria Bruni (Finland) Toni Vilander	(Denmark) Christoffer Nygaard (Denmark) Kristian Poulsen (Denmark) Nicki Thiim	Report

Entries were required to complete the timed race as well as to complete 70% of the overall winning car's race distance in order to earn championship points. A single bonus point was awarded to the team and all drivers of the pole position car for each category in qualifying. For the 24 Hours of Le Mans, the race result points allocation was doubled. Due to the 6 Hours of Fuji not completing 75% of the race time, half points were awarded in all championships.

=== Drivers Championships ===
Four titles were awarded to drivers in the 2013 season. A World Championship was reserved for LMP1 and LMP2 drivers. A World Cup was available for drivers in the LMGTE categories. Further, two FIA Endurance Trophies were also awarded to drivers in the LMP2 and LMGTE Am categories.

Points systems
Duration	1st	2nd	3rd	4th	5th	6th	7th	8th	9th	10th	Other	Pole
6 Hours	25	18	15	12	10	8	6	4	2	1	0.5	1
24 Hours	50	36	30	24	20	16	12	8	4	2	1	1

==== FIA World Endurance Championship — Drivers ====
Allan McNish, Tom Kristensen and Loïc Duval won the Championship at the 6 Hours of Shanghai.

Pos.	Driver	Team	SIL (United Kingdom)	SPA (Belgium)	LMS (France)	SÃO (Brazil)	COA (United States)	FUJ (Japan)	SHA (China)	BHR (Bahrain)	Total points
1	(United Kingdom) Allan McNish	(Germany) Audi Sport Team Joest	1	2	**1**	2	**1**	2	3	Ret	162
1	(Denmark) Tom Kristensen	(Germany) Audi Sport Team Joest	1	2	**1**	2	**1**	2	3	Ret	162
1	(France) Loïc Duval	(Germany) Audi Sport Team Joest	1	2	**1**	2	**1**	2	3	Ret	162
2	(Germany) André Lotterer	(Germany) Audi Sport Team Joest	2	**1**	5	**1**	3	**12**	1	2	149.25
2	(Switzerland) Marcel Fässler	(Germany) Audi Sport Team Joest	2	**1**	5	**1**	3	**12**	1	2	149.25
2	(France) Benoît Tréluyer	(Germany) Audi Sport Team Joest	2	**1**	5	**1**	3	**12**	1	2	149.25
3	(United Kingdom) Anthony Davidson	(Japan) Toyota Racing	3	4	2	Ret	2	13	Ret	1	106.25
3	(France) Stéphane Sarrazin	(Japan) Toyota Racing	3	4	2	Ret	2	13	Ret	1	106.25
3	(Switzerland) Sébastien Buemi	(Japan) Toyota Racing	3	4	2	Ret	2	13	Ret	1	106.25
4	(Austria) Alexander Wurz	(Japan) Toyota Racing	**4**	Ret	4			1	**2**	**Ret**	69.5
4	(France) Nicolas Lapierre	(Japan) Toyota Racing	**4**	Ret	4			1	**2**	**Ret**	69.5
5	(Switzerland) Mathias Beche	(Switzerland) Rebellion Racing	6	6	13	3	4	3	4	Ret	63.5
6	(France) Nicolas Prost	(Switzerland) Rebellion Racing	5	5	12	3	4		4	Ret	60
7	(Australia) John Martin	(Russia) G-Drive Racing	12	11	EX	4	5	5	5	3	53
7	(United Kingdom) Mike Conway	(Russia) G-Drive Racing	12	11	EX	4	5	5	5	3	53
7	(Russia) Roman Rusinov	(Russia) G-Drive Racing	12	11	EX	4	5	5	5	3	53
8	(Germany) Nick Heidfeld	(Switzerland) Rebellion Racing	5	5	12	3	4				48
9	(Brazil) Lucas di Grassi	(Germany) Audi Sport Team Joest		3	3						45
9	(Spain) Marc Gené	(Germany) Audi Sport Team Joest		3	3						45
9	(United Kingdom) Oliver Jarvis	(Germany) Audi Sport Team Joest		3	3						45
10	(Belgium) Bertrand Baguette	(France) OAK Racing	10	10	7	5	11	4	7	6	44.5
10	(United Kingdom) Martin Plowman	(France) OAK Racing	10	10	7	5	11	4	7	6	44.5
10	(Mexico) Ricardo González	(France) OAK Racing	10	10	7	5	11	4	7	6	44.5
11	(Denmark) David Heinemeier Hansson	(France) OAK Racing	**8**	9	8	9	10	6	6	4	42
11	(France) Olivier Pla	(France) OAK Racing	**8**	9	8	9	10	6	6	4	42
11	(United Kingdom) Alex Brundle	(France) OAK Racing	**8**	9	8	9	10	6	6	4	42
12	(Japan) Kazuki Nakajima	(Japan) Toyota Racing		Ret	4			1		**Ret**	37.5
Pos.	Driver	Team	SIL (United Kingdom)	SPA (Belgium)	LMS (France)	SÃO (Brazil)	COA (United States)	FUJ (Japan)	SHA (China)	BHR (Bahrain)	Total points

Colour	Result
Gold	Winner
Silver	Second place
Bronze	Third place
Green	Points classification
Blue	Non-points classification
Blue	Non-classified finish (NC)
Purple	Retired, not classified (Ret)
Red	Did not qualify (DNQ)
Red	Did not pre-qualify (DNPQ)
Black	Disqualified (DSQ)
White	Did not start (DNS)
White	Withdrew (WD)
White	Race cancelled (C)
Blank	Did not practice (DNP)
Blank	Did not arrive (DNA)
Blank	Excluded (EX)

**Bold** - Pole position

==== FIA World Endurance Cup for GT Drivers ====
Gianmaria Bruni won the FIA World Endurance Cup for GT Drivers at the 6 Hours of Bahrain.

Pos.	Driver	Team	SIL (United Kingdom)	SPA (Belgium)	LMS (France)	SÃO (Brazil)	COA (United States)	FUJ (Japan)	SHA (China)	BHR (Bahrain)	Total points
1	(Italy) Gianmaria Bruni	(Italy) AF Corse	5	1	5	1	2	2	4	1	145
2	(Italy) Giancarlo Fisichella	(Italy) AF Corse	5	1	5	1	2	2	4	3	135
3	(Germany) Stefan Mücke	(United Kingdom) Aston Martin Racing	**1**	4	3	2	Ret	**1**	**1**	Ret	125.5
3	(United Kingdom) Darren Turner	(United Kingdom) Aston Martin Racing	**1**	4	3	2	Ret	**1**	**1**	Ret	125.5
4	(Germany) Marc Lieb	(Germany) Porsche AG Team Manthey	4	5	1	4	4	4	6	**4**	123
4	(Austria) Richard Lietz	(Germany) Porsche AG Team Manthey	4	5	1	4	4	4	6	**4**	123
5	(Finland) Toni Vilander	(Italy) AF Corse	2	3	4	Ret	3	9	5	1	108
6	(France) Patrick Pilet	(Germany) Porsche AG Team Manthey	7	Ret	2	3	9	3	3	2	99.5
6	(Germany) Jörg Bergmeister	(Germany) Porsche AG Team Manthey	7	Ret	2	3	9	3	3	2	99.5
7	(Japan) Kamui Kobayashi	(Italy) AF Corse	2	3	4	Ret	3	9	5	3	98
8	(Brazil) Bruno Senna	(United Kingdom) Aston Martin Racing	**1**	**2**	**Ret**	Ret	**1**	5	2	Ret	94
9	(France) Frédéric Makowiecki	(United Kingdom) Aston Martin Racing	3	**2**	**Ret**		**1**	**1**			73.5
10	(France) Romain Dumas	(Germany) Porsche AG Team Manthey	4	5	1						72
11	(Portugal) Pedro Lamy	(United Kingdom) Aston Martin Racing	3	6	Ret	**11**	Ret	13	2	Ret	42.75
12	(Germany) Timo Bernhard	(Germany) Porsche AG Team Manthey	7	Ret	2						42

==== FIA Endurance Trophy for LMP2 Drivers ====
Bertrand Baguette, Martin Plowman and Ricardo González earned the Trophy for LMP2 Drivers at the 6 Hours of Bahrain.

Pos.	Driver	Team	SIL (United Kingdom)	SPA (Belgium)	LMS (France)	SÃO (Brazil)	COA (United States)	FUJ (Japan)	SHA (China)	BHR (Bahrain)	Total points
1	(Belgium) Bertrand Baguette	(France) OAK Racing	4	3	1	2	7	**1**	3	4	141.5
1	(United Kingdom) Martin Plowman	(France) OAK Racing	4	3	1	2	7	**1**	3	4	141.5
1	(Mexico) Ricardo González	(France) OAK Racing	4	3	1	2	7	**1**	3	4	141.5
2	(United Kingdom) Alex Brundle	(France) OAK Racing	2	2	**2**	6	6	3	2	2	132.5
2	(Denmark) David Heinemeier Hansson	(France) OAK Racing	2	2	**2**	6	6	3	2	2	132.5
2	(France) Olivier Pla	(France) OAK Racing	2	2	**2**	6	6	3	2	2	132.5
3	(Australia) John Martin	(Russia) G-Drive Racing	6	4	EX	**1**	**1**	2	**1**	1	132
3	(United Kingdom) Mike Conway	(Russia) G-Drive Racing	6	4	EX	**1**	**1**	2	**1**	1	132
3	(Russia) Roman Rusinov	(Russia) G-Drive Racing	6	4	EX	**1**	**1**	2	**1**	1	132
4	(Argentina) Luis Pérez Companc	(Argentina) Pecom Racing	3	**1**	4	3	2	5	Ret	**7**	110
4	(France) Nicolas Minassian	(Argentina) Pecom Racing	3	**1**	4	3	2	5	Ret	**7**	110
4	(Germany) Pierre Kaffer	(Argentina) Pecom Racing	3	**1**	4	3	2	5	Ret	**7**	110
5	(Thailand) Tor Graves	(United Kingdom) Delta-ADR	**1**	Ret	Ret	Ret	4	4	4		56
6	(France) Jacques Nicolet	(France) OAK Racing	8	6	Ret	5	8	9	6	5	51
7	(United Kingdom) James Walker	(United Kingdom) Delta-ADR	**1**	Ret		Ret	4	4			44
8	(United Kingdom) Tom Kimber-Smith	(United Kingdom) Greaves Motorsport	5	DNS	5		5				40
9	(Sweden) Björn Wirdheim	(United Kingdom) Greaves Motorsport				4			5	3	37
10	(Japan) Keiko Ihara	(United Arab Emirates) Gulf Racing Middle East		8	Ret						35
10	(Japan) Keiko Ihara	(France) OAK Racing				5		7	6	5	35

==== FIA Endurance Trophy for LMGTE Am Drivers ====
Jamie Campbell-Walter and Stuart Hall secured the Trophy for LMGTE Am Drivers at the 6 Hours of Bahrain.

Pos.	Driver	Team	SIL (United Kingdom)	SPA (Belgium)	LMS (France)	SÃO (Brazil)	COA (United States)	FUJ (Japan)	SHA (China)	BHR (Bahrain)	Total points
1	(United Kingdom) Jamie Campbell-Walter	(United Kingdom) Aston Martin Racing	**4**	4	5	1	1	2	3	5	129
1	(United Kingdom) Stuart Hall	(United Kingdom) Aston Martin Racing	**4**	4	5	1	1	2	3	5	129
2	(Portugal) Rui Águas	(United States) 8 Star Motorsports	3	1	8	2	**4**	4	1	2	128
2	(Venezuela) Enzo Potolicchio	(United States) 8 Star Motorsports	3	1	8	2	**4**	4	1	2	128
3	(France) Jean-Karl Vernay	(France) IMSA Performance Matmut	7	6	1	4	3	5	2	6	122
3	(France) Raymond Narac	(France) IMSA Performance Matmut	7	6	1	4	3	5	2	6	122
4	(Denmark) Kristian Poulsen	(United Kingdom) Aston Martin Racing	1	**2**	**Ret**	**Ret**	2	**1**	**Ret**	**1**	104.5
4	(Denmark) Christoffer Nygaard	(United Kingdom) Aston Martin Racing	1	**2**	**Ret**	**Ret**	2	**1**	**Ret**	**1**	104.5
5	(France) Julien Canal	(France) Larbre Compétition	2	3	4	6	6	8	5	4	97
5	(France) Patrick Bornhauser	(France) Larbre Compétition	2	3	4	6	6	8	5	4	97

=== Manufacturers' Championships ===
Two manufacturers' championships were held in the FIA WEC, one for sports prototypes and one for grand tourers. The World Manufacturers' Championship was only open to manufacturer entries in the LMP1 category, and points were only awarded to the highest scoring entry from each manufacturer for each event. The World Cup for GT Manufacturers allowed entries from both LMGTE Pro and LMGTE Am to participate, and allowed the top two finishing cars from each manufacturer to earn points toward their total. Audi secured their second consecutive World Manufacturers' Championship at the 6 Hours of Fuji. Ferrari won their second consecutive World Cup at the 6 Hours of Bahrain.

==== FIA World Endurance Championship — Manufacturers ====
Pos.	Manufacturer	SIL (United Kingdom)	SPA (Belgium)	LMS (France)	SÃO (Brazil)	COA (United States)	FUJ (Japan)	SHA (China)	BHR (Bahrain)	Total points
1	(Germany) Audi	1	**1**	**1**	**1**	**1**	**2**	1	2	207
2	(Japan) Toyota	**3**	3	2	Ret	2	1	**2**	**1**	142.5

==== FIA World Endurance Cup for GT Manufacturers ====
Pos.	Manufacturer	SIL (United Kingdom)	SPA (Belgium)	LMS (France)	SÃO (Brazil)	COA (United States)	FUJ (Japan)	SHA (China)	BHR (Bahrain)	Total points
1	(Italy) Ferrari	2	**1**	4	1	2	2	4	1	255
1	(Italy) Ferrari	5	2	5	6	3	8	5	3	255
2	(United Kingdom) Aston Martin	**1**	3	**3**	**2**	**1**	**1**	**1**	5	246.5
2	(United Kingdom) Aston Martin	3	5	8	5	5	5	2	8	246.5
3	(Germany) Porsche	4	4	1	3	4	3	3	**2**	230.5
3	(Germany) Porsche	7	9	2	4	7	4	6	4	230.5

=== Teams Championships ===
Teams in each of the four FIA WEC categories were eligible for their own FIA Endurance Trophies. Each car was scored separately, unlike 2012 in which team results were combined.

==== FIA Endurance Trophy for Private LMP1 Teams ====
The FIA Endurance Trophy for Private LMP1 Teams was open only to private teams competing in LMP1 without manufacturer support. Following Strakka Racing's withdrawal mid-season, Rebellion Racing were the only team to complete the championship.

Pos.	Car	Team	SIL (United Kingdom)	SPA (Belgium)	LMS (France)	SÃO (Brazil)	COA (United States)	FUJ (Japan)	SHA (China)	BHR (Bahrain)	Total points
1	12	(Switzerland) Rebellion Racing	1	1	2	1	1	1	1	Ret	173.5
2	21	(United Kingdom) Strakka Racing	Ret	2	1						68

==== FIA Endurance Trophy for LMP2 Teams ====
The Trophy for LMP2 Teams was won by the No. 35 car of OAK Racing at the 6 Hours of Bahrain.

Pos.	Car	Team	SIL (United Kingdom)	SPA (Belgium)	LMS (France)	SÃO (Brazil)	COA (United States)	FUJ (Japan)	SHA (China)	BHR (Bahrain)	Total points
1	35	(France) OAK Racing	4	3	1	2	7	**1**	3	4	141.5
2	24	(France) OAK Racing	2	2	**2**	5	6	3	2	2	134.5
3	26	(Russia) G-Drive Racing	6	4	EX	**1**	**1**	2	**1**	1	132
4	49	(Argentina) Pecom Racing	3	**1**	3	3	2	5	Ret	**6**	118
5	41	(United Kingdom) Greaves Motorsport	5	DNS	4	4	4		5	3	81
6	25	(United Kingdom) Delta-ADR	**1**	Ret	Ret	Ret	4	4	4	5	66
7	32	(Czech Republic) Lotus	NC	5	Ret	Ret	3	6	6	Ret	37
8	31	(Czech Republic) Lotus	Ret	6	Ret	Ret	Ret	7	Ret	Ret	11
9	28	(United Arab Emirates) Gulf Racing Middle East		7	Ret						6

==== FIA Endurance Trophy for LMGTE Pro Teams ====
The Trophy for LMGTE Pro Teams was won by the No. 51 car of AF Corse at the 6 Hours of Bahrain.

Pos.	Car	Team	SIL (United Kingdom)	SPA (Belgium)	LMS (France)	SÃO (Brazil)	COA (United States)	FUJ (Japan)	SHA (China)	BHR (Bahrain)	Total points
1	51	(Italy) AF Corse	5	**1**	5	1	2	2	4	1	145
2	97	(United Kingdom) Aston Martin Racing	**1**	3	3	2	Ret	**1**	**1**	Ret	128.5
3	92	(Germany) Porsche AG Team Manthey	4	4	1	**4**	4	4	6	**4**	126
4	91	(Germany) Porsche AG Team Manthey	6	Ret	2	3	5	3	3	2	109.5
5	71	(Italy) AF Corse	2	2	4	Ret	3	5	5	3	105
6	99	(United Kingdom) Aston Martin Racing	3	5	**Ret**	Ret	**1**	6	2	Ret	74

==== FIA Endurance Trophy for LMGTE Am Teams ====
The No. 81 car of 8 Star Motorsports won the Trophy for LMGTE Am Teams at the 6 Hours of Bahrain.

Pos.	Car	Team	SIL (United Kingdom)	SPA (Belgium)	LMS (France)	SÃO (Brazil)	COA (United States)	FUJ (Japan)	SHA (China)	BHR (Bahrain)	Total points
1	81	(United States) 8 Star Motorsports	3	1	6	2	**4**	4	1	2	136
2	96	(United Kingdom) Aston Martin Racing	**4**	4	4	1	1	2	3	5	133
3	76	(France) IMSA Performance Matmut	7	6	1	4	3	5	2	6	122
4	95	(United Kingdom) Aston Martin Racing	1	**2**	**Ret**	**Ret**	2	**1**	**Ret**	**1**	104.5
5	50	(France) Larbre Compétition	2	3	3	6	6	8	5	4	103
6	88	(Germany) Proton Competition	5	5	5	3	5	3	4	Ret	84.5
7	61	(Italy) AF Corse	8	8	2	Ret	7	7	6	3	76
8	57	(United States) Krohn Racing	6	7	Ret	5	8	6	Ret	Ret	32
