= Carlos Hank Rhon =

Mexican billionaire businessman

- Born: 1947 (age 78–79)
- Education: Universidad Nacional Autonoma de Mexico (BS)
- Occupation: Businessman
- Children: 3
- Father: Carlos Hank González
- Relatives: Jorge Hank Rhon (brother); Carlos Hank Gonzalez (son); Alex Hank (son)

Carlos Hank Rhon (born 1947) is a Mexican billionaire. He made his fortune from selling his financial firm Grupo Financiero Interacciones to Banorte. He also owns the diversified Grupo Hermes.

In 2022, Forbes ranked him the #661 fortune worldwide with a net worth of $4.4 billion.

== Biography ==
Carlos Hank Rhon is the son of politician and businessman Carlos Hank González. Hank is of Spanish and German descent. He graduated from the Universidad Nacional Autonoma de Mexico with a Bachelor of Science in engineering.

Hank Rhon was a power broker, along with his father, for Mexican president Carlos Salinas de Gortari. Starting in 1991, Hank Rhon bought shares in Laredo National Bank, allegedly buying additional shares using his associates' names in violation of Bank Holding Company Act requirements. Reuters reported in 1996 that an account at Laredo National Bank, owned by Hank Rhon, was being investigated by Mexican and U.S. officials for drug money laundering. U.S. federal law enforcement investigated Hank Rhon, as well as his father and his brother Jorge Hank Rhon, from December 1997 to early 1999. In June 1999, a report called the White Tiger Report (named after a white Siberian tiger Jorge attempted to smuggle across the Mexican-U.S. border) leaked from the National Drug Intelligence Center, describing Hank Rhon as a money launderer and close associate of cartel lord Amado Carrillo Fuentes. After lobbying by the family, then-Attorney General Janet Reno wrote a letter saying the report was neither released nor vetted properly.

In December 1998, the Federal Reserve Board started an enforcement action to divest Carlos Hank Rhon from his 71% ownership of Laredo National Bank, accusing him of lying about his ownership and of improper lending. The charges were settled in 2001; as part of the settlement agreement, he agreed to pay a $40 million fine and resign as chairman and director while admitting no wrongdoing.

The Panama Papers show that on September 20, 2013, Trevor Pinchemain contacted Mossack Fonseca on behalf of Hank Rhon with the intent to buy an offshore firm with $10.7 million. Mossack Fonseca declined 4 days later citing negative information about Hank Rhon and his family.

In 2015, his name appeared in the Swiss Leaks investigation.

According to Mexican government-published data for the first 3 months of 2020, companies led by Hank Rhon and his son, also named Carlos Hank González, received 24 federal contracts worth 7 billion pesos.

== Personal life ==
His wife is the daughter of the founder of the banking group Banorte, Roberto González Barrera. He is the brother of Jorge Hank Rhon, a controversial political figure in Mexico. He resides primarily in Mexico City. His son Alex Hank is a painter and former photographer.
