= Retirement Funds Administrators (Mexico) =

Retirement Funds Administrators (AFORE) (Spanish: Administradoras de Fondos para el Retiro) are companies authorized to manage Mexican individual retirement accounts as authorized by the Ministry of Finance and Public Credit of Mexico. They are structured as companies that manage these funds under strict regulations. These administrators are regulated by the Comisión Nacional del Sistema de Ahorro para el Retiro (CONSAR).

AFOREs manage accounts that accumulate contributions by the employer, the Mexican federal government and the employee. The fund will then payout on retirement of the employee at the age of 65 or on other specific criteria.

== Sub-accounts ==
Individual retirement accounts are split into four separate sub-accounts which are:

=== Retirement, lay-off and old age ===
This sub-account contains funds contributed by the employer, federal government and employee.

- The employer contributes with an equivalent to 2% of the employee's salary to retirement and 3.15% of the salary to the lay-off and old age account. Contributions take place bimonthly.
- The government contributes 0.225% of the salary to the lay-off and old age account bimonthly and an equivalent of 5.5% of minimum wage in the Federal District.
- The employee contributes with 1.125% of the salary bimonthly.

=== Voluntary contributions ===
An employee may also contribute extra funds voluntarily. Additional contributions may be done directly with the AFORE or automatically deducted from the employee's salary.

=== Housing ===
This is a sub-account into which employers contribute an equivalent of five percent of the employee's salary. Funds are deposited with the INFONAVIT through the Fondo Nacional de la Vivienda ("National Housing Fund") and the AFORE only registers contributions and balances.

=== Complementary contributions ===
This sub-account will contain additional funds contributed by the employer or the employee to increase the pension balance. These funds can only be withdrawn after retirement.

== Withdrawal criteria ==
Withdrawals of funds from these accounts is possible under certain situations such as:

- Old age. Funds can be withdrawn on or after reaching the age of 65.
- Layoffs. A maximum of 10% of the funds can be withdrawn on or after the day 46 of being unemployed. This option can be exercised every five years.
- Marriage. A maximum of 30 days of minimum wage in the Federal District can be withdrawn for wedding expenses.
- Home purchase. The funds in the housing sub-account can be withdrawn to buy a house. If these funds are not used before retirement they can be withdrawn then.
- Death
- Accidents and illnesses leading to disability

== See also ==
- Mexico Pension Plan
