= Gruma =

Mexican multinational corn flour (masa) and tortilla manufacturing company

Coordinates: 25°39′17″N 100°21′34″W

Gruma, S.A.B. DE C.V
- Type: Sociedad Anónima Bursátil de Capital Variable
- Traded as: BMV: GRUMA B
- Industry: Food processing
- Founded: 1949; 77 years ago in Cerralvo, N.L., Mexico
- Founder: Roberto González Barrera
- Headquarters: Monterrey, Mexico
- Area served: Worldwide
- Key people: Juan A. González Moreno (Chairman and CEO)
- Products: Corn flour; Tortillas; Corn chips; Flat breads
- Revenue: ▼US$ 3,755 million (2014); US$ 3,844 million (2013)
- Net income: ▲US$ 322 million (2014); US$ 248 million (2013)
- Total assets: ▼US$ 2,755 million (2014); US$ 3,253 million (2013)
- Number of employees: 17,845 (2014)
- Subsidiaries: Gruma Corporation; GIMSA; Others
- Website: www.gruma.com

Gruma, S.A.B. de C.V., known as Gruma, is a Mexican multinational corn flour (masa) and tortilla manufacturing company headquartered in San Pedro, near Monterrey, Nuevo León, Mexico. It is the largest corn flour and tortilla manufacturer in the world. Its brand names include Mission Foods (Misión in Mexico), Maseca, and Guerrero.

Gruma reported revenues of US$3.8 billion for 2014. It operates more than 79 plants worldwide, mainly in Mexico, the United States, and Europe, and employs approximately 18,000 people. It is listed on the Mexican Stock Exchange since 1994, and it had a NYSE listing through ADRs from 1998 to September 2015. It is a constituent of the IPC, the main benchmark index of Mexican stocks.

== History ==
The first industrial production facility of corn flour in the world was opened in 1949 under the name "Molinos Azteca, S.A. de C.V.", later shortened to "Grupo Maseca". Expansion quickly led to the government of Costa Rica inviting the company to invest in that country, in 1973. From then on, a long tradition of investments outside of Mexico was followed. In 1977, Grupo Maseca opened a subsidiary in California, pioneering in the production of tortilla in the United States. In Texas, in 1982, Maseca opened the first production facility of nixtamalized corn flour in that country.

The election of Carlos Salinas de Gortari, a close family friend of Grupo Maseca president Roberto Gonzalez Barrera, allowed Gruma to grow substantially while hastening the decline of traditional masa and tortilla production. In 1990, the Mexican Department of Commerce under Salinas's administration instituted limits on the overall amount of fresh corn purchased at a support price by CONASUPO, requiring all further growth in the corn market to come from corn flour instead. The only two corn flour providers at the time were Grupo Maseca and the publicly-owned Miconsa; the latter was mismanaged by Salinas's administration to the point of losing almost all of its market share, leaving Gruma with a near-monopoly. Salinas also changed government policy to incentivize tortillerias to use Maseca rather than fresh masa, punishing those who refused with lower-quality corn and stricter grain limits.

By 1990, the company had subsidiaries in North America and Central America, including the United States, Honduras, and Costa Rica. It was in this year when the company made its initial public offering in the Mexican Stock Exchange as "GIMSA", or "Grupo Industrial Maseca".

Gruma consolidated itself as a holding company after acquiring 10% of Banorte in 1992. A series of expansions opened subsidiaries around the world, including one in Coventry, England in 2000, and another one in Shanghai, China in 2006, also next in Ukraine in 2010 and recently in Tekkeköy, Samsun, Turkey in 2011.

== Controversies ==
Gruma has faced criticism for its continued operations in Russia following the 2022 invasion of Ukraine. Despite widespread international sanctions and calls for businesses to withdraw from the Russian market, Gruma maintains one production plant within the country. This decision has drawn scrutiny and raised concerns about the company's ethical considerations and its alignment with international efforts to pressure Russia.

== Subsidiaries ==
Apart from its 10% interest in Banorte, Gruma operates as a holding company for a number of subsidiaries that produce, market, and distribute its various products around the world.

=== Mission Foods ===
Mission Foods is one of the world's largest producers of flatbread, tortilla and corn flour products.

=== Gruma Corporation ===
Gruma Corporation produces and commercializes corn flour and tortillas in the United States, Europe, and China. In the United States, Gruma Corporation is headquartered in Irving, Texas.

Gruma Corporation in China is based in Shanghai, and made it the first tortilla producer in that country. It has a production capacity of 15,000 tonnes (14,800 long tons; 16,500 short tons) of wheat tortillas, 7,000 tonnes (6,890 long tons; 7,720 short tons) of corn tortillas and 6,000 tonnes (5,910 long tons; 6,610 short tons) of snacks. In Asia, the company also has distributors in Japan, South Korea, Singapore, Hong Kong, Thailand, Philippines, and Taiwan.

=== GIMSA ===
Short for "Grupo Industrial Maseca, S.A.", GIMSA is dedicated to the production, distribution, and marketing of corn flour in Mexico. GIMSA has the largest production capacity, with a market share of about 70%. GIMSA has production facilities in 15 states, including Nayarit, Sonora, Chihuahua, Veracruz, Baja California Sur, Sinaloa, Jalisco, Yucatan, Nuevo León, Baja California, Chiapas, Tamaulipas, Guanajuato, Michoacán, and the State of Mexico.

=== Molinera de México ===
Molinera de México is the largest producer of wheat flour in Mexico, with a capacity of one million tons. Gruma entered this market through joint ventures with Archer-Daniels-Midland in 1996, and the further acquisition of other companies. Among its principal brands are "Selecta", "Reposada", "Sello de Oro", and "Diluvio".

=== Prodisa ===
Prodisa produces, markets, and distributes tortillas under the brand "Misión".

=== Tecno Maíz ===
Tecno Maíz designs, manufactures and markets machinery for the production of tortillas and other corn snacks. The machinery is sold under the brands "Tortec" and "Batitec".

=== Gruma Centroamerica ===
With operations in Costa Rica, Honduras, Guatemala, and El Salvador, Gruma produces over 126,000 tonnes (124,000 long tons; 139,000 short tons) of corn flour a year, marketed under the brands "Maseca", "Masarica", and "Torti Masa". Gruma also markets tortillas under the brand "Torti Rica", and other snacks with the brands "Tosty" and "Luisiana".

Gruma also produces palmito in 37,000 acres (14,973 ha) of fields in Costa Rica, to be exported to France, Spain, Belgium, Canada, and the United States.

=== Molinos Nacionales (Monaca) and Derivados de Maíz Seleccionados (DEMASECA) ===
These two companies operate Gruma's interests in Venezuela, which make the company the second largest producer of corn and wheat flour in that country.
