= Roberto González Barrera =

Mexican businessman

Roberto González Barrera (September 1, 1930 – 25 August 2012) was a Mexican businessman. He was the chairman of Gruma, the largest producer of tortillas and corn flour in the world, and of Banorte, the largest Mexican-owned private bank in Mexico. Because of his prominent role in the expansion of Gruma, he was often nicknamed "El Maseco" or "Don Maseco" (a reference to one of Gruma's subsidiaries, Grupo Industrial Maseca), as well as the "King of Tortillas".

== Personal life ==
Barrera was born in Cerralvo, Nuevo León. At the age of five, before starting school, he was selling eggs, bread, vegetables and other foodstuff in his native town of Cerralvo. "I was very happy," wrote Gonzalez Barrera in an institutional profile. "My childhood was very happy but I did not miss school. When I had free time I went to the streets to make money."

Upon entering primary school he also became a shoe-shine, along with his sale of food on the street. Almost naturally, at age 11 he left school for good and began working in a grocery warehouse his father had opened in Cerralvo where he sold dairy products, and at age 15, he had his own business. "I remember one day my grandfather asked me which of all the things I did, was the most profitable. I replied that selling vegetables," wrote Gonzalez Barrera in his institutional profile. "Then he said, 'Give yourself completely to it and do nothing more." "It seemed like a call to action."

Later Gonzalez Barrera worked in Pemex, as a driver at a plant in Veracruz, where he was in charge of something no one wanted to do, because of the risk: explosive transport. It was during this time that he also partnered in a small coconut plantation. He made good money, but after two years, suffering from malaria, he returned to his hometown, with 200,000.00 pesos of his earnings in the coconut business. In Cerralvo, entered into joint partnership with his father in the family business that had already begun and developed new projects.

At age 18, in the search for further business expansion, he had his first encounter with corn, on seeing his first corn mill. Curious, he asked for explanations about the process for the manufacture of tortillas, and realizing the business potential when he discovered that cotton workers consumed up to 15 tons of corn per month, imagined the future.

After convincing his father, they bought their first corn mill in 1948 for 75,000.00 pesos (the peso-dollar exchange rate fluctuated between $4.85 and $6.95), and took it to Cerralvo, where he started what is now Maseca, the company that manufactures and markets one out of every four corn tortillas in Europe, Asia and Central America. For starting it off they had to sell all of their other businesses, and when they ran out of money, a friend he had made in Cerralvo, General Bonifacio Salinas Leal, governor of Nuevo León, lent them money and kept some of the company's stock that, years later, would sell back to them again. Thus began a long relationship with politicians, which is one of the most repeated criticism that is made to Gonzalez Barrera: leveraging his political connections for his company's growth.

He entered the Billionaire's club not with the tortilla business, however, but through the Banorte financial group of which, since 1992 he has been the main shareholder, and the only Mexican bank to remains in Mexican ownership after the economic crisis of 1995. Its equity stake in Banorte, the third largest bank in Mexico, returned Gonzalez Barrera to 2011's Forbes list of billionaires, and that fact changed the nature of his wealth.

Some health and family problems threaten Maseca (where 23% of the stock is owned by U.S. conglomerate Archer Daniels Midland). and most of the remainder is split in half, with 50% held by his first wife, from whom he never divorced. González Barrera died in Houston, Texas, on 25 August 2012 from complications of cancer, he was 81 years old.

His son Roberto González Sr. was a racecar driver, finishing third at the 1976 12 Hours of Sebring. His grandsons Ricardo González Valdez and Roberto González Valdez are also racecar drivers.

== Controversy ==
González Barrera refused to testify in the case against Raúl Salinas de Gortari, brother of former President Carlos Salinas de Gortari. Allegedly, his justification was "I am a friend of Mr. Raúl".
