= Carlos Hank González =

Mexican politician (1927–2001)

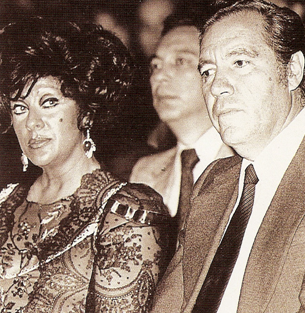
Carlos Hank González (right), with Carmen Romano, in 1980

Carlos Hank González (August 27, 1927–August 11, 2001), nicknamed El Profesor ("The Professor"), was a Mexican politician and businessman. Originally a teacher, he was an entrepreneur who built political contacts along with businesses, leading to various government and political positions at the state (State of Mexico) and national level. He was prevented from seeking the presidency due to laws requiring both parents to be Mexicans by birth, whereas his father was German.

A leaked report from the National Drug Intelligence Center (NDIC) noted that Hank González's alleged involvement in drug trafficking and money laundering at one time posed "a significant criminal threat to the United States." The NDIC report also alleged Hank Gonzalez committed political corruption, tax evasion, bribery and vote-buying. The report was later denied by US authorities, as well as its source. US Attorney General Janet Reno clarified that the report was a draft "beyond the substantive expertise and area of responsibility of the NDIC", and that its release was unauthorized.

== Biography ==
Carlos Hank González was born in Santiago Tianguistenco in the State of Mexico. His father, Jorge Hank Weber, was a German émigré who married a Mexican woman (thus, Hank wasn't eligible to be president since it was required under law to be Mexican-born as well his parents, until bills were amended in 1993). Hank graduated from the Escuela Nacional de Toluca as a primary education teacher and from the Normal Superior (Teacher's College) de México as a professor of history and biology. From 1947 to 1951 he was a teacher at the Secundaria Federal de Atlacomulco. To supplement his income, he sold candy on the side. He grew and exchanged his small businesses into larger ones, along the way adding names of prominent politicians to his list of contacts. He founded a business empire of banking and transportation interests. In 1999, Forbes estimated his wealth at about US$1.3 billion.

He married Guadalupe Rhon, with whom he had five children, 3 boys and 2 girls. He is the father of Carlos Hank Rhon, Cuauhtemoc Hank Rhon, and Jorge Hank Rhon and grandfather of Carlos Hank González who now heads the company called Grupo Financiero Interacciones.

=== Career ===
Hank González's political career began when he moved from Atlacomulco to Toluca to take charge of the State of Mexico's Departmento de Escuelas Secundarias y Profesionales (Department of Professional and Secondary Schools) as well as the Oficina de Juntas de Mejoramiento Moral, Cívico y Material (Office of Committees for Moral, Civic and Material Improvement) between 1952 and 1953. The following year he was in charge of the treasury for the municipality of Toluca. From 1955 to 1957 he was the president of the ayuntamiento of Toluca.

His federal service began in 1958 when he was elected to Congress (diputado federal) for the State of Mexico's 6th district. However, at the height of his political career, he served as the governor of the State of Mexico from 1969 to 1975 and was appointed regent of Mexico City in 1976. Federally, he served as Secretary of Tourism from 1988 to 1990 when he was then named as Secretary of Agriculture and Hydraulic Resources.

He was considered one of the leaders of the old guard wing of the Institutional Revolutionary Party (PRI). He began as chief of the Delegación del Sector Popular at district, state and national conventions of the PRI, then was a delegate for the party for the states of Chiapas, Tabasco, Campeche and Quintana Roo. He worked his way up to be a member of the Comisión Pólitica del Comité Ejecutivo Nacional, advising presidents of the party. His death not only left a vacant place in the party structure of the PRI but also signaled the end of a cycle in Mexican politics.

Constitutionally barred from running for the Mexican presidency by a provision then in force which excluded those with a foreign-born parent from holding the office. His father, Jorge Hank Weber, was German and a colonel in both the German and Mexican armies. However, Hank González was influential on the PRI party, culminating in the late 1980s and early 1990s during the presidency of Carlos Salinas de Gortari.

As mayor of Mexico City, he built the Eje vial system of roads and other projects designed to make the city more car-friendly.

== Death ==
In 1997, Carlos Hank González suffered an embolism and died in 2001 of cancer, spending the last few years of his life in the United States for treatment.

== Criminal allegations ==
Carlos Hank Gonzalez was accused of having ties to drug traffickers such as Félix Gallardo, the Arellano brothers, and Mayo Zambada. He and his group were also accused of having control over American banks, investment companies, casinos for laundering money, drug trafficking with cartels, and other illegal activities. According to a report by the U.S. National Drug Intelligence Center (NDIC) nicknamed Operation White Tiger, Hank González's involvement in drug trafficking and money laundering posed "a significant criminal threat to the United States." While U.S. law enforcement officials had spent years investigating Carlos Hank Gonzalez and his sons Carlos Hank Rhon and Jorge Hank Rhon, the assessment by several agencies marked the first time that all three had been alleged direct links to the operations of major Mexican drug organizations. The report drew on information from the U.S. Drug Enforcement Administration, FBI, U.S. Customs Service, CIA, Interpol and others, that was later denied. The report alleges that intelligence agencies had intercepted conversations of the Hank family coordinating drug shipments. The document claims that the Hank family had laundered money on a massive scale, assisted drug trafficking organizations in transporting drug shipments, and engaged in large-scale public corruption, while being closely associated with the late Juárez Cartel leader Amado Carrillo Fuentes. Agents involved in the probe feared that Washington would conclude that Operation White Tiger was too controversial, and potentially too disruptive to Mexican-American relations for it to continue, and suspected it would eventually be blocked; as previous investigations of top Mexican politicians had been. Former Mexican official and politician Eduardo Valle, in an interview recovered by the World Policy Institute, described Carlos Hank as the "primary intermediary between the multinational drug trafficking enterprises and the Mexican political system". Eduardo Valle, founder of the Mexican Worker's Party, was a political opponent of PRI.

Following the media revelations about Operation White Tiger, the Hank family, which has denied its alleged links to top Mexican narcotraffickers and the alleged protection the White Tiger report claims they provided, hired former U.S. senator Warren Rudman as their attorney to represent their interests in Washington. The lawsuit forced US authorities, particularly Attorney General Janet Reno, to publicly recognize the report was a leaked draft of an executive summary and "beyond the substantive expertise and area of responsibility of the NDIC." The sources of the report also denied its content after the lawsuit was presented.

== In popular culture ==
Hank González appears in a prominent role in Season 3 of the Netflix serial drama Narcos: Mexico. He is played by Manuel Uriza. According to experts in the field, the questionable mention of Hank in the show relies on the fact that he is not alive, therefore, Netflix is able to use his name without the risk of receiving a defamation lawsuit. This was confirmed by lead actor José María Yazpik who stated that "since Hank is already dead, his name can be used, while in other seasons, when faced with possible lawsuit, they opted to change the names".
