= Banorte =

Mexican financial group

Grupo Financiero Banorte, S.A.B. de C.V.
- Type: Sociedad Anónima Bursátil de Capital Variable
- Traded as: BMV: GFNORTE; BMAD: XNOR
- Industry: Finance and Insurance
- Founded: 1899; 127 years ago
- Headquarters: Monterrey, Mexico
- Number of locations: 1,269 branches
- Area served: Mexico
- Key people: Carlos Hank González (Chairman) José Marcos Ramírez Miguel (CEO)
- Services: commercial banking, pensions, insurance, brokerage
- Revenue: ▲ Mx$ 212.3 billion (2021) ▲US$ 10.3 billion
- Net income: ▲ Mx$ 35 billion (2021) ▲US$ 1.7 billion
- Total assets: ▲ Mx$ 1850.9 billion (2021) ▲US$ 89.5 billion
- Number of employees: 27,000
- Website: www.banorte.com

Grupo Financiero Banorte, S.A.B. de C.V., doing business as Banorte (Banco Mercantil del Norte) and as Ixe, is a Mexican banking and financial services holding company with headquarters in Monterrey and Mexico City. It is one of the four largest commercial banks of Mexico by assets and loans, and the largest retirement fund administrator (AFORE).

Grupo Financiero Banorte operates its commercial bank under the brands Banorte and Ixe, offering savings accounts, credit cards, payday loans, mortgages, commercial loans and auto loans. Its performing loan portfolio was of US$35 billion in 2014. It also performs insurance, pension, leasing, and brokerage activities.

Banorte has 1,269 branches and 7,297 ATMs nationwide. It can also receive deposits through more than 5,200 commercial establishments, such as drug stores, convenience stores, and supermarkets.

Grupo Financiero Banorte is listed on the Mexican Stock Exchange and on the Latibex. It is a constituent of the IPC, the main benchmark index of the Mexican Stock Exchange, and of the S&P Latin America 40, which includes leading, blue chip companies from Latin America.

== History ==
Banorte was founded in 1992 in the city of Monterrey, Nuevo León, Mexico and is the primary subsidiary of Grupo Financiero Banorte, one of Mexico's largest and oldest financial institutions, which has been present in Mexico since 1899. The "Banorte" trademark is a well-known mark in Mexico. The web domain name "banorte.com" was created in 1998.

It is a Forbes Global 2000 company, with total consolidated assets of approximately $80 billion, more than 30 billion dollars in assets under management, 12,500 employees and 950 branches. It is the only major bank in Mexico not owned by any foreign group.

It was established in 1889 as Banco Mercantil de Monterrey. In 1985 merged with Banco Regional del Norte to form Banco Mercantil del Norte (Banorte). In 1992, it was purchased from the Mexican Government by a group of investors headed by the Mexican businessman Roberto González Barrera. Over the next decade, Banorte transformed itself from a regional bank, based mainly in the northern Mexico, to one with nationwide coverage. In late 2001, Banorte acquired Bancrecer in US$125 million. Bancrecer had been taken over in 1999 by IPAB. Bancrecer had itself taken over another bank, Banco del Noroeste (Banoro), in 1997.

Banorte expanded their business lines to include leasing (Arrendadora Banorte) in 1990, and to warehousing and factoring services (Almacenadora Banorte and Factor Banorte) in 1991. In order to set up a financial group with full services Banorte wanted a securities company under its control, and Banorte acquired Casa de Bolsa Afin in July 1993. In 1997, Banorte established an alliance with the Italian insurance company Generali to offer insurance, pension funds, and Afore's services through their subsidiaries Afore Banorte-Generalli, Seguros Banorte-Generalli and Pensiones Banorte-Generalli.

Banorte has operations in New York (Banorte Securities) and Grand Cayman (Banorte Grand Cayman Branch).

Key numbers for fiscal year ending December 31, 2021 for Grupo Financiero Banorte:

- Total Assets: 1.6 trillion pesos (US$90 billion)
  Equity: 237 billion pesos (US$11 billion)
  Return on assets (ROA): 1.6%
- Return on average Equity (ROE): 15.3%

== Money laundering involvement in US Operation Casablanca ==
Operation Casablanca was a three-year U.S. investigation of major Mexican banking institutions for laundering illicit drug profits. Mexican authorities were not informed about the investigation.

This operations led U.S. Customs agents to arrest 22 high-ranking and mid-level bankers from 12 of Mexico's largest banks when they traveled to the U.S. in mid-May, expecting to attend a banking conference. The investigation produced 160 indictments, including 3 Mexican banks and 26 Mexican bankers. Banorte was among the banks and bankers implicated in money laundry, according to the Operation Casablanca. From the June to July 1998 issue of Money Laundering Alert, Banorte was suspected to have laundered $7,323,103.51, and Banorte faced a civil penalty lawsuit under Title 18, USC Sec. 1956(b) and civil forfeiture action under Title 18, USC Secs. 981 & 984. On July 1, 1999, a U.S. federal judge in Los Angeles dismissed with "extreme prejudice" the forfeiture case against Banorte. No criminal charges were filed and U.S. authorities gave them back $1.4 million seized in the operation. Banorte had implemented anti-money laundering policies and procedures and had detected and closed money laundering accounts prior to Operation Casablanca. These policies and practices assisted Banorte in defending itself against the money laundering charges.

== Banorte's entry to the US banking market ==
In 2006, Banorte acquired 70% of INB Financial Corp stock for $259 million. INB Financial Corp is the holding company of Texas-based Inter National Bank. Banorte exercised its option to acquire the remaining 30% of INB Financial Corp stock for $146.6 million in 2009. As of March 2013, Inter National Bank has $2.1 billion in assets and is the 19th largest Texas bank.

== Sponsorship ==
As of 2020, Banorte has been the sponsor of the Mérida Marathon in Mérida, Mexico, a city in the state of Yucatan.

On 14 March 2025, Banorte bought the naming rights to Estadio Azteca in Mexico City and renamed it Estadio Banorte which helped fund the renovations for the 2026 FIFA World Cup.

== See also ==
- List of banks in Mexico
- List of companies traded on the Mexican Stock Exchange
- List of Mexican companies
- Economy of Mexico

== Sources ==
- Grupo Financiero Banorte and Banorte USA
- News, "Operation Casablanca"
- Drug Trafficking in Mexico: A First General Assessment
- Mexican bank, Banorte, challenges U.S. and prevails in Casablanca
- Kroll's Notable Cases
- Mexico bank gets back funds seized in U.S. sting
- Citibank—The Confia Acquisition in Mexico
- WIPO Arbitration and Mediation Center
- Adrian E. Tschoegl. "Foreign ownership in Mexican Banking: A Self- Correcting Phenomenon". The Wharton School of the University of Pennsylvania, Philadelphia, PA 19104, October 23, 2006.
- Taeko Hoshino. Privatization of Mexico's public enterprises and the restructuring of the private sector. The Developing Economies, XXXIV-1 (March 1996)
- www.greatplacetowork.com.mx
- Banorte exchange rate
