= 2002 Formula Renault 2.0 UK Championship =

Motor racing competition

Seasons
- ← 2001 2003 →

The 2002 Formula Renault 2.0 UK Championship was the 14th British Formula Renault Championship. The season began at Brands Hatch on 1 April and ended on 22 September at Donington Park, after seventeen rounds held in England and Scotland, with most events only staging one race and two events staging a double header.

== Teams and drivers ==
Team	No.	Driver name	Rounds
Motaworld Racing	1	(United Kingdom) Robert Bell	All
Motaworld Racing	2	(United Kingdom) Alex Lloyd	All
Motaworld Racing	3	(Australia) Will Davison	All
Motaworld Racing	4	(United Kingdom) Gary Turkington	All
Aztec International	5	(United Kingdom) Robert Scott	All
Aztec International	6	(Netherlands) Ricardo van der Ende	1-2
Aztec International	6	(United Kingdom) Chaz Small	4
Mackie Motorsport	7	(United Kingdom) Steven Kane	1-3
Mackie Motorsport	8	(United Kingdom) Charlie Hollings	All
Paston Racing	9	(Japan) Hayanari Shimoda	1, 3-4, 7, 9-11
Paston Racing	33	(United Kingdom) Marc McLoughlin	All
Paston Racing	43	(Republic of Ireland) James Murphy	All
Scorpio	10	(United Kingdom) Oliver Scullion	1-5
Scorpio	11	(Republic of Ireland) David Hall	1-7
Team DFR	12	(United Kingdom) Susie Stoddart	1-10
Team DFR	12	(United Kingdom) Mark Fell	11
Fortec Motorsport	14	(United Kingdom) Danny Watts	All
Fortec Motorsport	15	(Brazil) Luciano Garcia	All
Fortec Motorsport	16	(United Kingdom) Jamie Green	All
Fortec Motorsport	17	(United Kingdom) Katherine Legge	1-4
John Village Automotive	18	(United Kingdom) Ryan Sharp	All
John Village Automotive	19	(United Kingdom) Stuart King	1-2
John Village Automotive	19	(Mexico) Aurelio López Jr.	11
John Village Automotive	20	(France) Vasilije Calasan	1-8
John Village Automotive	21	(Sweden) Stefan Söderberg	All
Status Motorsport	22	(Republic of Ireland) Philip Kershaw	All
Status Motorsport	44	(United Kingdom) Leighton Walker	1-2
Status Motorsport	44	(Republic of Ireland) Robby Coleman	4
Status Motorsport	55	(United Kingdom) Ivor McCullough	All
Manor Motorsport	23	(United States) Patrick Long	All
Manor Motorsport	24	(Venezuela) Ernesto José Viso	All
Manor Motorsport	25	(United Kingdom) Lewis Hamilton	All
Manor Motorsport	26	(Republic of Ireland) Matt Griffin	All
Manor Motorsport	66	(New Zealand) Fabian Coulthard	10-11
Falcon Motorsport	27	(Sweden) Robin Rudholm	All
Falcon Motorsport	28	(United Kingdom) James Rossiter	1-10
Falcon Motorsport	29	(United Kingdom) Ben Reeves	All
Cliff Dempsey Racing	30	(Republic of Ireland) Keith Dempsey	1-10
Cliff Dempsey Racing	30	(Republic of Ireland) Alan Dwyer	11
Cliff Dempsey Racing	31	(Sweden) Richard Goransson	1-2
Cliff Dempsey Racing	31	(United Kingdom) Daniel Welch	4-5
Cliff Dempsey Racing	31	(United Kingdom) Gideon Cresswell	6
Cliff Dempsey Racing	31	(United Kingdom) Barry Sime	7-9
Cliff Dempsey Racing	31	(Japan) Takahiro Ito	10
Cliff Dempsey Racing	31	(Republic of Ireland) Noel Roddy	11
Saxon International	76	(United Kingdom) Jason Coffin	1
Saxon International	76	(United Kingdom) Chaz Small	2-3
Saxon International	76	(United Kingdom) Alex Kapadia	5
Saxon International	77	(United Kingdom) Alex Buncombe	1-2, 4-5
Saxon International	77	(United Kingdom) Daren Taylor	3
Welch Motorsport	86	(United Kingdom) Philip Keen	11
Welch Motorsport	88	(United Kingdom) Daniel Welch	11

== Race calendar and results ==
Round		Circuit	Date	Pole position	Fastest lap	Winning driver	Winning team
1	R1	Brands Hatch (GP), Kent	1 April	(United Kingdom) Danny Watts	(United Kingdom) Marc McLoughlin	(United Kingdom) Danny Watts	Fortec Motorsport
2	R2	Oulton Park (Island), Cheshire	21 April	(United Kingdom) Katherine Legge	(United Kingdom) Danny Watts	(United Kingdom) Danny Watts	Fortec Motorsport
3	R3	Thruxton Circuit, Hampshire	6 May	(United Kingdom) Robert Bell	(United Kingdom) Lewis Hamilton	(United Kingdom) Marc McLoughlin	Paston Racing
4	R4	Silverstone Circuit (International), Northamptonshire	3 June	(United Kingdom) Jamie Green	(United Kingdom) Lewis Hamilton	(United Kingdom) Danny Watts	Fortec Motorsport
5	R5	Thruxton Circuit, Hampshire	16 June	(United Kingdom) Lewis Hamilton	(United Kingdom) Lewis Hamilton	(United Kingdom) Lewis Hamilton	Manor Motorsport
6	R6	Brands Hatch (GP), Kent	30 June	(United Kingdom) Danny Watts	(United Kingdom) Danny Watts	(United Kingdom) Danny Watts	Fortec Motorsport
7	R7	Croft Circuit, North Yorkshire	14 July	(United Kingdom) Danny Watts	(United Kingdom) Jamie Green	(United Kingdom) Danny Watts	Fortec Motorsport
8	R8	Snetterton Circuit, Norfolk	28 July	(United States) Patrick Long	(United Kingdom) Danny Watts	(United States) Patrick Long	Manor Motorsport
8	R9	Snetterton Circuit, Norfolk	28 July	(United Kingdom) Danny Watts	(United Kingdom) Jamie Green	(United Kingdom) Jamie Green	Fortec Motorsport
9	R10	Knockhill Circuit, Fife	11 August	(United Kingdom) Jamie Green	(United Kingdom) Danny Watts	(United Kingdom) Jamie Green	Fortec Motorsport
10	R11	Brands Hatch (Indy), Kent	26 August	(United Kingdom) Lewis Hamilton	(United Kingdom) Lewis Hamilton	(United Kingdom) Lewis Hamilton	Manor Motorsport
11	R12	Donington Park (GP), Leicestershire	21 September	(United Kingdom) Lewis Hamilton	(United Kingdom) Lewis Hamilton	(United Kingdom) Lewis Hamilton	Manor Motorsport
11	R13	Donington Park (GP), Leicestershire	22 September	(United Kingdom) Robert Bell	(United Kingdom) Danny Watts	(United Kingdom) Danny Watts	Fortec Motorsport

== Drivers' Championship ==
- Points were awarded on a 32-28-25-22-20-18-16-14-12-11-10-9-8-7-6-5-4-3-2-1 basis, with 1 point for fastest lap. A driver's 15 best results counted towards the championship.

Pos	Driver	BRH	OUL	THR	SIL	THR	BRH	CRO	SNE		KNO	BRH	DON		Pts
Pos	Driver	1	2	3	4	5	6	7	8	9	10	11	12	13	Pts
1	(United Kingdom) Danny Watts	**1**	1	DSQ	1	3	**1**	**1**	3	**4**	3	2	2	1	333
2	(United Kingdom) Jamie Green	Ret	Ret	8	**2**	2	2	2	6	1	**1**	3	4	5	279
3	(United Kingdom) Lewis Hamilton	3	15	2	9	**1**	20	6	2	Ret	2	**1**	**1**	4	274
4	(Australia) Will Davison	7	6	3	8	11	6	3	4	3	10	Ret	5	6	222
5	(United Kingdom) Robert Bell	4	4	**DSQ**	4	6	7	5	9	10	4	4	3	**Ret**	212
6	(United Kingdom) Ryan Sharp	13	2	7	5	5	4	7	11	12	8	5	16	2	211
7	(United Kingdom) Marc McLoughlin	2	3	1	3	17	12	8	10	7	Ret	14	8	8	201
8	(United States) Patrick Long	5	Ret	11	20	12	5	25	**1**	2	19	6	6	3	183
9	(United Kingdom) Alex Lloyd	12	Ret	6	6	8	3	4	7	11	6	7	11	15	182
10	(United Kingdom) Gary Turkington	17	5	12	13	10	9	13	8	5	18	9	10	9	141
11	(Republic of Ireland) Matt Griffin	Ret	12	18	7	4	14	23	16	16	13	12	7	7	116
12	(Sweden) Robin Rudholm	6	Ret	5	Ret	7	8	14	12	Ret	Ret	13	12	10	112
13	(United Kingdom) James Rossiter	14	17	4	12	Ret	10	Ret	15	6	7	11			103
14	(Brazil) Luciano Garcia	15	16	Ret	Ret	15	19	9	5	9	5	16	14	16	100
15	(Sweden) Stefan Söderberg	20	7	16	14	Ret	13	12	Ret	8	Ret	8	15	11	90
16	(Republic of Ireland) Keith Dempsey	10	Ret	9	11	9	Ret	10	14	Ret	11	DNS			73
17	(Republic of Ireland) James Murphy	DNS	Ret	10	Ret	Ret	11	11	Ret	Ret	20	Ret	13	14	47
18	(United Kingdom) Susie Stoddart	Ret	10	20	18	16	15	21	21	15	14	15			45
19	(United Kingdom) Ivor McCullough	21	9	Ret	23	20	18	16	13	Ret	9	Ret	22	Ret	41
20	(Venezuela) Ernesto José Viso	18	18	Ret	16	Ret	Ret	20	17	20	23	10	9	Ret	40
21	(United Kingdom) Robert Scott	Ret	DNS	Ret	Ret	22	16	15	19	19	15	17	20	12	35
22	(United Kingdom) Oliver Scullion	11	Ret	13	15	13									32
23	(United Kingdom) Charlie Hollings	DNS	DNS	15	19	Ret	Ret	19	20	13	17	18	17	Ret	30
24	(Republic of Ireland) Philip Kershaw	DNS	DNS	Ret	22	18	Ret	17	18	14	12	20	19	23	29
25	(United Kingdom) Ben Reeves	Ret	13	14	25	Ret	17	Ret	Ret	Ret	Ret	19	Ret	Ret	21
26	(United Kingdom) Chaz Small		8	19	21										16
27	(Netherlands) Ricardo van der Ende	8	Ret												14
28	(Japan) Hayanari Shimoda	Ret		17	17			18			22	21	26	18	14
29	(United Kingdom) Alex Buncombe	Ret	Ret		10	19									13
30	(Sweden) Richard Göransson	9	Ret												12
31	(United Kingdom) Leighton Walker	Ret	11												10
32	(United Kingdom) Barry Sime							22	22	17	16				9
33	(United Kingdom) Daniel Welch				24	Ret							Ret	13	8
34	(United Kingdom) Steven Kane	Ret	14	Ret											7
35	(United Kingdom) Alex Kapadia					14									7
36	(New Zealand) Fabian Coulthard											23	18	17	7
37	(United Kingdom) Katherine Legge	16	**Ret**	DSQ	29										5
38	(France) Vasilije Calasan	DNS	DNS	23	27	Ret	Ret	Ret	23	18	21	Ret			3
39	(Mexico) Aurelio López, Jr.												24	19	2
40	(United Kingdom) Stuart King	19	Ret												2
41	(Republic of Ireland) Alan Dwyer												25	20	1
	(Republic of Ireland) David Hall	DNS	DNS	21	26	21	21	24							0
	(United Kingdom) Mark Fell												21	22	0
	(United Kingdom) Philip Keen												23	21	0
	(United Kingdom) Daren Taylor			22											0
	(Japan) Takahiro Ito											22			0
	(Republic of Ireland) Noel Roddy												27	Ret	0
	(Republic of Ireland) Robby Coleman				28										0
	(United Kingdom) Gideon Cresswell						Ret								0
	(United Kingdom) Jason Coffin	DNS													0
Pos	Driver	BRH	OUL	THR	SIL	THR	BRH	CRO	SNE		KNO	BRH	DON		Pts

Colour	Result
Gold	Winner
Silver	Second place
Bronze	Third place
Green	Points classification
Blue	Non-points classification
Blue	Non-classified finish (NC)
Purple	Retired, not classified (Ret)
Red	Did not qualify (DNQ)
Red	Did not pre-qualify (DNPQ)
Black	Disqualified (DSQ)
White	Did not start (DNS)
White	Withdrew (WD)
White	Race cancelled (C)
Blank	Did not practice (DNP)
Blank	Did not arrive (DNA)
Blank	Excluded (EX)

**Bold** – Pole
Italics – Fastest Lap
