= 2004 British Formula 3 International Series =

Seasons
- ← 2003 2005 →

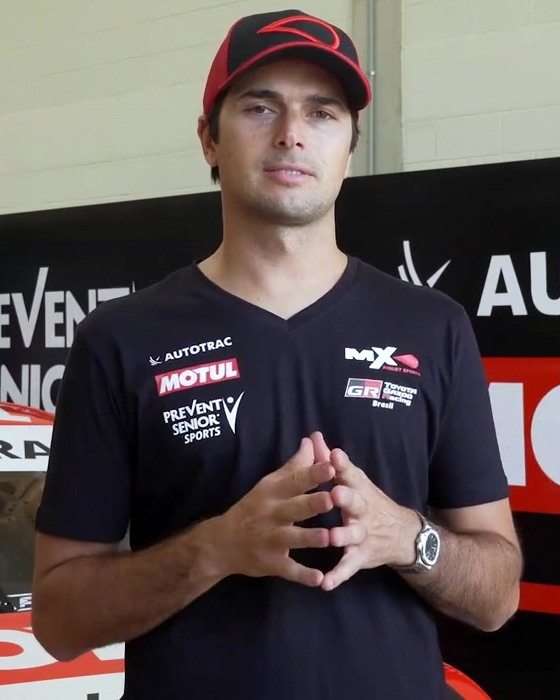
2004 champion, Nelson Piquet Jr.

The 2004 British Formula 3 International Series was the 54th British Formula 3 International Series season. It commenced on 3 April, and ended on 1 October after twenty-four races.

The scoring system was 20-15-12-10-8-6-4-3-2-1 points awarded to the first ten finishers, with one extra point added to the driver who set the fastest lap of the race. If a Class B driver or a guest driver finished among the top finishers, he would not score points for the main championship, and the points would be awarded to the next driver in the standings.

== Drivers and teams ==
The following teams and drivers were competitors in the 2004 British Formula 3 International Series. The Scholarship class is for older Formula Three cars. Teams in the Invitation class are not series regulars, and do not compete for championship points.

Team	Chassis	Engine	No	Driver	Rounds
Championship Class
(United Kingdom) Carlin Motorsport	Dallara F304	Mugen-Honda	1	(Monaco) Clivio Piccione	All
(United Kingdom) Carlin Motorsport	Dallara F304	Mugen-Honda	2	(Portugal) Álvaro Parente	All
(United Kingdom) Carlin Motorsport	Dallara F304	Mugen-Honda	21	(Brazil) Danilo Dirani	All
(United Kingdom) Carlin Motorsport	Dallara F304	Mugen-Honda	22	(Brazil) Alexandre Negrão	11
(United Kingdom) Hitech Racing	Dallara F304	Renault	3	(United Kingdom) Andrew Thompson	All
(United Kingdom) Hitech Racing	Dallara F304	Renault	4	(Estonia) Marko Asmer	All
(United Kingdom) Hitech Racing	Dallara F304	Renault	23	(Brazil) Lucas di Grassi	All
(United Kingdom) Hitech Racing	Dallara F304	Renault	24	(United Kingdom) James Walker	All
(Switzerland) Menu F3 Motorsport	Dallara F304	Opel	5	(Australia) Will Davison	1-5
(Switzerland) Menu F3 Motorsport	Dallara F304	Opel	5	(United Kingdom) Ivor McCullough	12
(Switzerland) Menu F3 Motorsport	Dallara F304	Opel	6	(United Kingdom) Rob Austin	9-10, 12
(Switzerland) Menu F3 Motorsport	Dallara F304	Opel	6	(Malaysia) Fairuz Fauzy	1-4
(Switzerland) Menu F3 Motorsport	Dallara F304	Opel	39	(Malaysia) Fairuz Fauzy	5-7
(United Kingdom) Fortec Motorsport	Dallara F304	Opel	7	(United Kingdom) James Rossiter	All
(United Kingdom) Fortec Motorsport	Dallara F304	Opel	8	(Republic of Ireland) Ronayne O'Mahony	1
(United Kingdom) Fortec Motorsport	Dallara F304	Opel	8	(Australia) Marcus Marshall	3-10
(United Kingdom) Alan Docking Racing	Dallara F304	Mugen-Honda	10	(Australia) Will Power	All
(United Kingdom) Promatecme	Lola-Dome F106/4	Mugen-Honda	11	(United Kingdom) Danny Watts	1-3, 5-12
(United Kingdom) P1 Racing	Dallara F304	Mugen-Honda	18	(United Kingdom) Adam Carroll	All
(United Kingdom) P1 Racing	Dallara F304	Mugen-Honda	19	(Venezuela) Ernesto Viso	1-6
(United Kingdom) P1 Racing	Dallara F304	Mugen-Honda	19	(Malaysia) Fairuz Fauzy	8-12
(United Kingdom) T-Sport	Dallara F304	Mugen-Honda	32	(India) Karun Chandhok	1-9
(United Kingdom) T-Sport	Dallara F304	Mugen-Honda	32	(Australia) Barton Mawer	11
(Brazil) Piquet Sports	Dallara F304	Mugen-Honda	33	(Brazil) Nelson Piquet Jr.	All
Scholarship Class
(Sweden) Performance Racing Europe	Dallara F301	Opel	42	(United Kingdom) Stephen Jelley	All
(Sweden) Performance Racing Europe	Dallara F301	Opel	43	(Australia) Barton Mawer	1-5
(Sweden) Performance Racing Europe	Dallara F301	Opel	43	(Republic of Ireland) Ronayne O'Mahony	7-12
(United Kingdom) Reon Motorsport	Dallara F301	Renault	45	(United Kingdom) James Winslow	9
(United Kingdom) Planet Racing	Dallara F301	Mugen-Honda	46	(United Kingdom) Lars Sexton	2, 9, 12
(United Kingdom) Promatecme	Dallara F301	Mugen-Honda	51	(France) Vasilije Calasan	All
(United Kingdom) Alan Docking Racing	Dallara F301	Mugen-Honda	59	(United Kingdom) Adam Khan	1-5
(United Kingdom) T-Sport	Dallara F301	Mugen-Honda	69	(United Kingdom) Ryan Lewis	All
(United Kingdom) Mango Racing	Dallara F301	Mugen-Honda	78	(India) Ajith Kumar	1-5
Invitation Entries
(France) Opel Signature	Dallara F304	Opel	71	(France) Nicolas Lapierre	11
(France) Opel Signature	Dallara F304	Opel	72	(Belgium) Gregory Franchi	11

== Calendar and results ==
Round	Circuit	Date	Pole Position	Fastest Lap	Winning driver	Winning team	Scholarship Class Winner
1	(United Kingdom) Donington Park	3 April	(United Kingdom) Adam Carroll	(United Kingdom) Adam Carroll	(United Kingdom) Adam Carroll	P1 Racing	(United Kingdom) Ryan Lewis
2	(United Kingdom) Donington Park	4 April	(Portugal) Álvaro Parente	(Brazil) Nelson Angelo Piquet	(Monaco) Clivio Piccione	Carlin Motorsport	(United Kingdom) Ryan Lewis
3	(United Kingdom) Silverstone	17 April	(United Kingdom) James Rossiter	(Brazil) Nelson Angelo Piquet	(United Kingdom) James Rossiter	Fortec Motorsport	(United Kingdom) Ryan Lewis
4	(United Kingdom) Silverstone	18 April	Round cancelled^{1}				
5	(United Kingdom) Croft	1 May	(Brazil) Danilo Dirani	(Brazil) Danilo Dirani	(Brazil) Danilo Dirani	Carlin Motorsport	(United Kingdom) Ryan Lewis
6	(United Kingdom) Croft	2 May	(Brazil) Danilo Dirani	(Brazil) Danilo Dirani	(Brazil) Danilo Dirani	Carlin Motorsport	(Australia) Barton Mawer
7	(United Kingdom) Knockhill	15 May	(Venezuela) Ernesto Viso	(United Kingdom) James Rossiter	(Venezuela) Ernesto Viso	P1 Racing	(Australia) Barton Mawer
8	(United Kingdom) Knockhill	16 May	(United Kingdom) James Rossiter	(Brazil) Nelson Angelo Piquet	(United Kingdom) James Rossiter	Fortec Motorsport	(United Kingdom) Ryan Lewis
4^{1}	(United Kingdom) Snetterton	5 June	(Brazil) Danilo Dirani	(Brazil) Nelson Angelo Piquet	(Brazil) Nelson Angelo Piquet	Piquet Sports	(United Kingdom) Ryan Lewis
9	(United Kingdom) Snetterton	6 June	(Brazil) Lucas di Grassi	(Brazil) Nelson Angelo Piquet	(Brazil) Nelson Angelo Piquet	Piquet Sports	(United Kingdom) Ryan Lewis
10	(United Kingdom) Snetterton	6 June	(United Kingdom) James Rossiter	(Brazil) Nelson Angelo Piquet	(United Kingdom) Adam Carroll	P1 Racing	(United Kingdom) Ryan Lewis
11	(United Kingdom) Castle Combe	19 June	(United Kingdom) Danny Watts	(United Kingdom) James Rossiter	(United Kingdom) Danny Watts	Promatecme	(United Kingdom) Ryan Lewis
12	(United Kingdom) Castle Combe	20 June	(United Kingdom) Adam Carroll	(Estonia) Marko Asmer	(Portugal) Álvaro Parente	Carlin Motorsport	(United Kingdom) Ryan Lewis
13	(United Kingdom) Donington Park	26 June	(United Kingdom) Adam Carroll	(Brazil) Nelson Angelo Piquet	(United Kingdom) Adam Carroll	P1 Racing	(United Kingdom) Ryan Lewis
14	(United Kingdom) Donington Park	27 June	(Portugal) Álvaro Parente	(Brazil) Danilo Dirani	(Monaco) Clivio Piccione	Carlin Motorsport	(United Kingdom) Stephen Jelley
15	(United Kingdom) Oulton Park	17 July	(Brazil) Nelson Angelo Piquet	(Brazil) Nelson Angelo Piquet	(Brazil) Nelson Angelo Piquet	Piquet Sports	(United Kingdom) Ryan Lewis
16	(United Kingdom) Oulton Park	18 July	(Brazil) Nelson Angelo Piquet	(Brazil) Nelson Angelo Piquet	(Brazil) Nelson Angelo Piquet	Piquet Sports	(United Kingdom) Stephen Jelley
17	(United Kingdom) Silverstone	14 August	(Brazil) Nelson Angelo Piquet	(Brazil) Nelson Angelo Piquet	(Brazil) Nelson Angelo Piquet	Piquet Sports	(France) Vasilije Calasan
18	(United Kingdom) Silverstone	15 August	(Brazil) Nelson Angelo Piquet	(United Kingdom) Adam Carroll	(Australia) Marcus Marshall	Fortec Motorsport	(France) Vasilije Calasan
19	(United Kingdom) Thruxton	29 August	(United Kingdom) James Rossiter	(United Kingdom) Rob Austin	(Brazil) Lucas di Grassi	Hitech Racing	(United Kingdom) Ryan Lewis
20	(United Kingdom) Thruxton	30 August	(Brazil) Lucas di Grassi	(Brazil) Nelson Angelo Piquet	(Brazil) Lucas di Grassi	Hitech Racing	(United Kingdom) Stephen Jelley
21	(Belgium) Spa-Francorchamps	11 September	(Brazil) Nelson Angelo Piquet	(United Kingdom) Adam Carroll	(United Kingdom) Adam Carroll	P1 Racing	(United Kingdom) Ryan Lewis
22	(Belgium) Spa-Francorchamps	12 September	(United Kingdom) Adam Carroll	(United Kingdom) James Rossiter	(United Kingdom) Adam Carroll	P1 Racing	(United Kingdom) Ryan Lewis
23	(United Kingdom) Brands Hatch	2 October	(Brazil) Nelson Angelo Piquet	(United Kingdom) Rob Austin	(United Kingdom) James Rossiter	Fortec Motorsport	(United Kingdom) Ryan Lewis
24	(United Kingdom) Brands Hatch	3 October	(Monaco) Clivio Piccione	(Estonia) Marko Asmer	(Brazil) Nelson Angelo Piquet	Piquet Sports	(United Kingdom) Ryan Lewis

Notes:

1. – The second race at the first Silverstone meeting was cancelled due to poor weather conditions. It was run at the Snetterton meeting.

== Standings ==
=== Championship Class ===
Pos	Driver	DON (United Kingdom)		SIL (United Kingdom)		CRO (United Kingdom)		KNO (United Kingdom)		SNE (United Kingdom)			CAS (United Kingdom)		DON (United Kingdom)		OUL (United Kingdom)		SIL (United Kingdom)		THR (United Kingdom)		SPA (Belgium)		BRH (United Kingdom)		Pts
1	(Brazil) Nelson Angelo Piquet	2	2	3	C	5	Ret	10	3	1	1	4	7	Ret	6	3	1	1	1	4	Ret	2	6	4	2	1	282
2	(United Kingdom) Adam Carroll	1	Ret	4	C	Ret	Ret	4	Ret	2	2	1	3	2	1	7	4	8	5	18	3	7	1	1	9	4	233
3	(United Kingdom) James Rossiter	3	8	1	C	2	Ret	3	1	Ret	Ret	2	8	5	3	6	5	3	2	7	2	4	18	13	1	2	228
4	(Monaco) Clivio Piccione	12	1	6	C	9	4	5	Ret	8	9	11	2	4	2	1	8	Ret	10	Ret	4	6	2	2	11	18	161
5	(Brazil) Danilo Dirani	4	Ret	Ret	C	1	1	7	9	4	4	14	Ret	Ret	5	9	11	5	12	3	8	12	3	3	4	Ret	146
6	(United Kingdom) Danny Watts	Ret	DNS	5	C	7	9			5	6	5	1	3	Ret	8	6	9	3	8	6	8	4	5	3	6	139
7	(Portugal) Álvaro Parente	8	10	8	C	Ret	10	8	8	6	Ret	8	5	1	7	2	3	4	9	2	7	5	10	8	8	5	137
8	(Brazil) Lucas di Grassi	10	9	Ret	C	6	3	15	4	3	Ret	7	9	8	Ret	Ret	Ret	2	11	11	1	1	7	6	Ret	3	130
9	(Australia) Will Power	Ret	4	2	C	15	Ret	2	2	10	3	3	6	13	Ret	10	12	Ret	4	6	10	18	8	9	Ret	9	111
10	(Estonia) Marko Asmer	9	7	9	C	4	6	12	11	Ret	Ret	16	12	7	Ret	4	14	6	6	10	5	9	5	7	5	8	87
11	(Venezuela) Ernesto Viso	5	5	7	C	Ret	Ret	1	6	12	5	9	4	Ret													66
12	(Malaysia) Fairuz Fauzy	7	Ret	11	C	11	8	11	13	7	7	6	13	6	Ret	12	2	7	8	13	11	11	DNS	21	Ret	11	49
13	(Australia) Will Davison	14	3	10	C	3	2	Ret	7	13	8	10															48
14	(India) Karun Chandhok	11	11	14	C	8	5	6	5	14	Ret	Ret	Ret	9	4	Ret	Ret	DNS	13	Ret							37
15	(United Kingdom) Andrew Thompson	6	6	12	C	10	7	9	10	9	15	15	10	Ret	Ret	Ret	7	10	14	12	9	10	14	14	10	7	36
16	(United Kingdom) Rob Austin																		7	5	14	3			6	12	32
17	(Australia) Marcus Marshall					16	13	13			11	12	11	14	13	11	9	12	Ret	1	Ret	14					24
18	(United Kingdom) James Walker	13	14	13	C	12	11	Ret	12	11	10	13	14	12	12	5	10	Ret	15	14	15	13	13	11	7	10	20
19	(Brazil) Alexandre Negrão																						11	12			1
20	(Australia) Barton Mawer																						12	15			0
21	(United Kingdom) Ivor McCullough																								14	13	0
22	(Republic of Ireland) Ronayne O'Mahony	17	Ret																								0
Guest drivers ineligible for points
	(Belgium) Gregory Franchi																						9	Ret			0
	(France) Nicolas Lapierre																						DNS	10			0
Scholarship Class
1	(United Kingdom) Ryan Lewis	15	12	15	C	13	15	Ret	14	15	12	17	15	10	8	15	13	13	18	Ret	12	16	15	16	12	14	423
2	(United Kingdom) Stephen Jelley	20	13	16	C	14	14	Ret	Ret	Ret	13	19	17	11	9	13	Ret	11	Ret	17	13	15	DNS	19	13	15	266
3	(France) Vasilije Calasan	19	Ret	19	C	18	16	17	Ret	Ret	17	20	16	Ret	11	Ret	16	14	16	9	17	DNS	17	18	16	17	212
4	(Australia) Barton Mawer	16	Ret	17	C	17	12	14	15	17	14	18															134
5	(Republic of Ireland) Ronayne O'Mahony														10	14	15	Ret	Ret	16	16	17	16	17	Ret	16	121
6	(United Kingdom) Adam Khan	18	Ret	18	C	19	17	16	Ret	16	16	DNS															78
7	(India) Ajith Kumar	21	15	Ret	C	Ret	18	18	16	18	18	21															70
8	(United Kingdom) Lars Sexton			Ret	C														17	19					15	19	43
9	(United Kingdom) James Winslow																		Ret	15							15
Pos	Driver	DON (United Kingdom)		SIL (United Kingdom)		CRO (United Kingdom)		KNO (United Kingdom)		SNE (United Kingdom)			CAS (United Kingdom)		DON (United Kingdom)		OUL (United Kingdom)		SIL (United Kingdom)		THR (United Kingdom)		SPA (Belgium)		BRH (United Kingdom)		Pts

Colour	Result
Gold	Winner
Silver	Second place
Bronze	Third place
Green	Points classification
Blue	Non-points classification
Blue	Non-classified finish (NC)
Purple	Retired, not classified (Ret)
Red	Did not qualify (DNQ)
Red	Did not pre-qualify (DNPQ)
Black	Disqualified (DSQ)
White	Did not start (DNS)
White	Withdrew (WD)
White	Race cancelled (C)
Blank	Did not practice (DNP)
Blank	Did not arrive (DNA)
Blank	Excluded (EX)
