= James Rossiter =

British racing driver (born 1983)

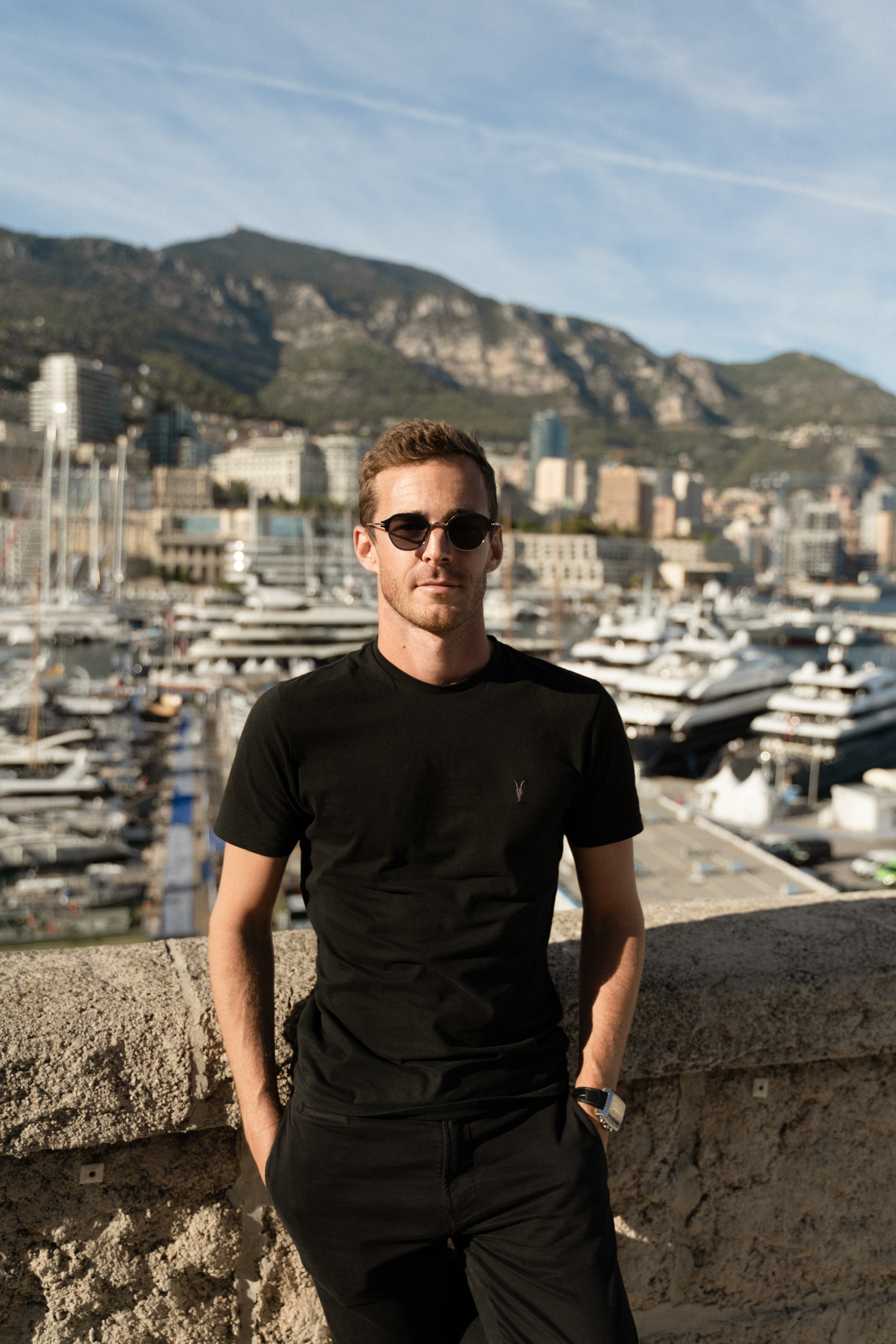
- Rossiter in Monaco in 2022
- Nationality: (United Kingdom) British
- Born: James Stuart Rossiter; 25 August 1983 (age 43) Oxford, England
- Relatives: Jeremy Rossiter (father)

Super GT career
- Debut season: 2013
- Categorisation: FIA Platinum
- Former teams: TOM'S, Team LeMans, Team Impul
- Starts: 48
- Wins: 6
- Poles: 4
- Fastest laps: 3
- Best finish: 3rd in 2013 and 2014

Previous series
- 2012–22 2013–19 2013–18 2011–13 2011 2008 2006 2005 2004 2002–03: World Endurance Championship; Super GT; Super Formula; 24 Hours of Le Mans; Le Mans Series; American Le Mans Series LMP2; Formula Renault 3.5 Series; Formula 3 Euro Series; British Formula 3 British Formula Renault

James Stuart Rossiter (born 25 August 1983) is a British former professional racing driver who currently is part of the Formula E ITV Sport commentary team, alongside Nicki Shields and fellow racing drivers Karun Chandhok and Sam Bird. He is former team principal of the late Maserati MSG Racing in Formula E.

Rossiter was a test driver for BAR, Honda, Super Aguri and Force India in Formula One and was due to drive for the proposed US F1 Team in the 2010 season. During that time he was the test driver for the Lotus T125. Before joining Maserati, Rossiter was the sporting director and reserve driver for DS Techeetah and raced for Peugeot Sport in the FIA World Endurance Championship.

== Career ==
=== Karting ===
Born in Oxford, England, Rossiter started his motor racing career in karting at the age of 14. Competing in TKM and Rotax Max karts, he stepped up to single-seater competition after three years, testing a Formula Palmer Audi at the Bedford Autodrome in 2001.

=== Formula Renault and Formula 3 ===
Rossiter took the first steps in his professional career in 2002 by joining Falcon Motorsport to compete in the Formula Renault UK championship. Securing a best finish of fourth at Thruxton, he finished 13th in the drivers’ standings with 103 points but returned for the 2003 season, switching to Fortec Motorsport.

Hitting his competitive stride immediately, Rossiter finished third behind Mike Conway and Lewis Hamilton at the season opener at Snetterton and scored a further nine podiums, including one win, over the remainder of the season. He finished third overall behind Hamilton and Alex Lloyd and was recognised by a leading journalist as "the only driver to take the fight to Lewis Hamilton".

In 2004, Rossiter continued his relationship with Fortec Motorsport but graduated to the British Formula 3 championship. He scored three victories and 12 podiums during the season to finish third in the drivers’ championship behind Nelson Piquet Jr. and Adam Carroll, while also receiving the Rookie of the Year Award.

With further performances at the Macau Grand Prix and Masters of Formula 3 events in 2004, Rossiter received the BRDC John Cooper Award and was selected as the winner of the BAR young F1 driver search from a group of upcoming racing drivers.

In 2005, Rossiter graduated to international competition, racing in the Formula 3 Euro Series for Signature-Plus. He finished the season in seventh in the drivers’ championship with one win and three podiums before switching to Formula Renault 3.5 for 2006, in which he was 14th.

=== Formula One ===
After being selected as the winner of the BAR young F1 driver search in 2004, Rossiter continued to perform development work for the team throughout the 2005 season. He was retained for 2006 following Honda's acquisition of the team and in 2007, worked primarily with the Super Aguri F1 team, spearheaded by Aguri Suzuki and Mark Preston.

In 2008, Rossiter was again retained by Honda as the team's primary test and development driver for its Formula One program. Working in Japan, he played a key role in the development of the Honda RA109 which would become Jenson Button's world championship-winning Brawn BGP 001 in 2009.

Following Honda's withdrawal from Formula One, Rossiter focussed on securing a drive with one of four new teams entering the sport for the 2010 season. He was signed by the US F1 Team to partner José María López but was not officially confirmed prior to the team's collapse.

Rossiter was instead poised to join the IndyCar Series, driving for KV Racing Technology after testing for the team at Barber Motorsports Park although the team re-signed Mario Moraes, which left him without a drive. He subsequently joined Sky Sports as a commentator for their IndyCar coverage.

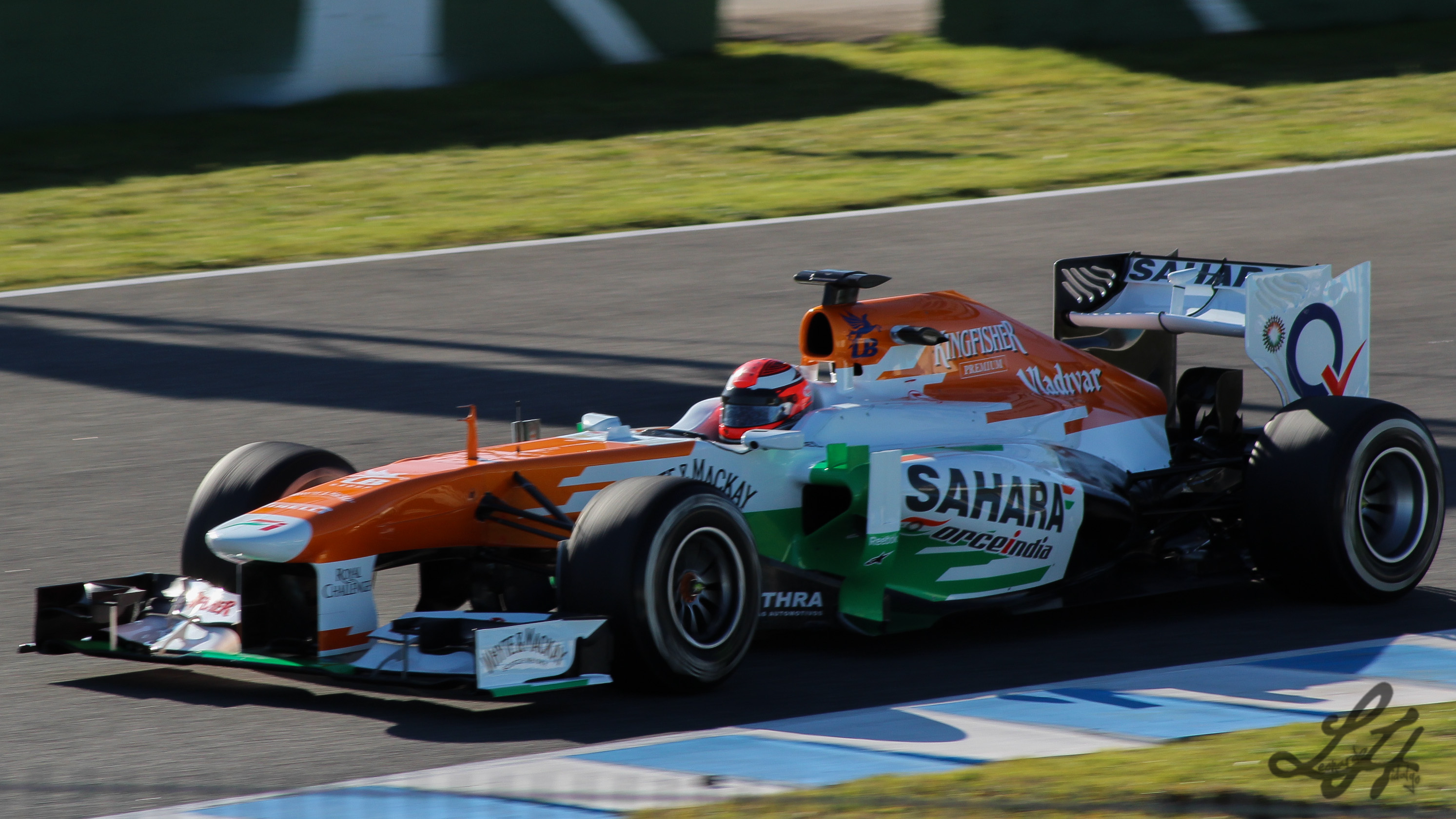
Rossiter testing the Force India VJM06 during the pre-season testing in 2013

After three years away from Formula One, Rossiter returned in 2012 by joining Force India as a test and simulator driver. He drove the team's 2013 car, the VJM06, at the first pre-season test at Jerez and was set to make his first practice appearance at the British Grand Prix to replace Adrian Sutil, although this was cancelled due to wet weather.

=== Super GT and Super Formula ===
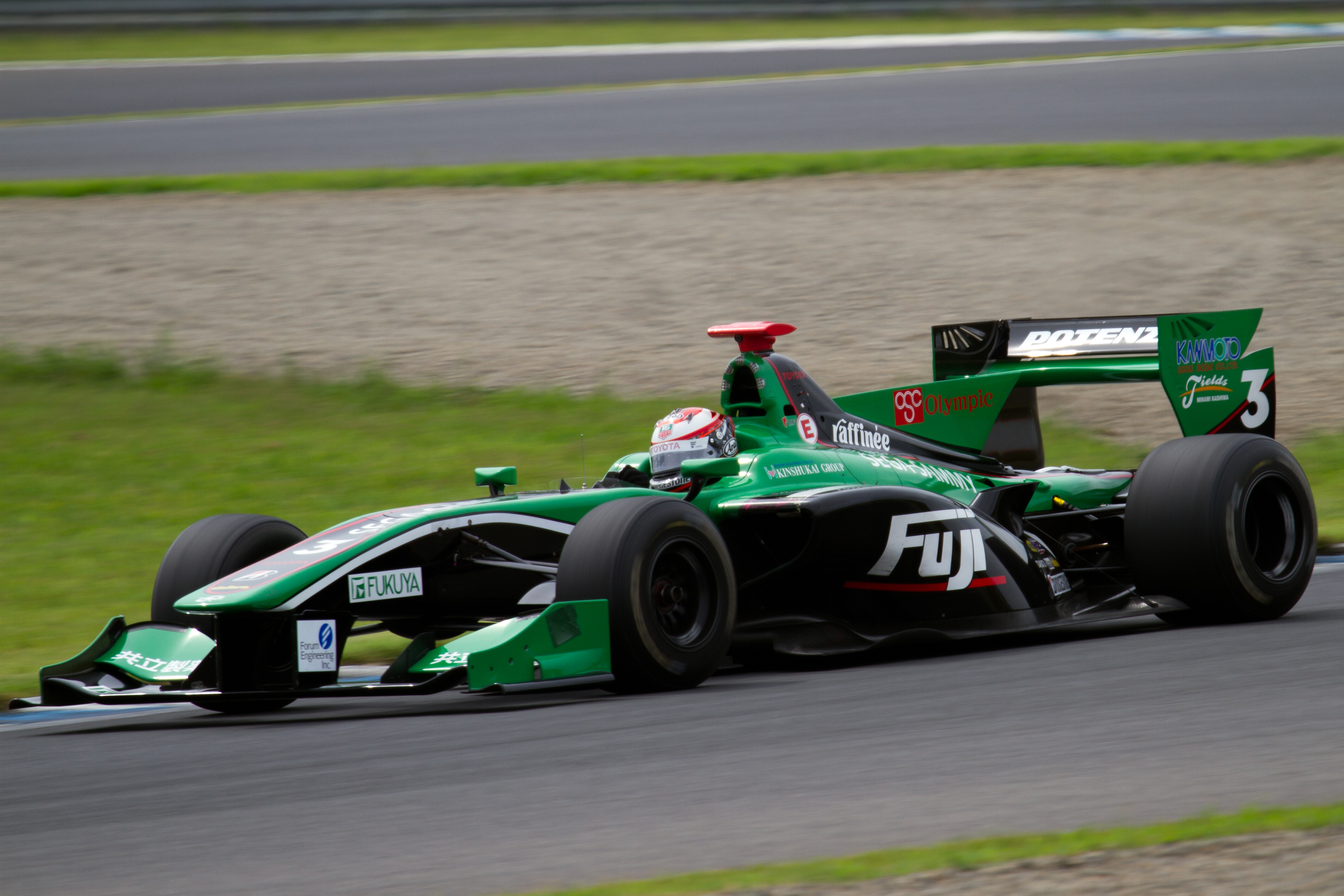
Rossiter during qualifying at Motegi in 2014.

In 2013, Rossiter joined TOM'S to race full-time in the Super GT championship. As team-mate to ex-F1 driver Kazuki Nakajima, he won the second race of the season at Fuji and the penultimate race at Autopolis. He finished third in the standings, nine points behind champions Kohei Hirate and Yuji Tachikawa and also ran a part-time campaign in Super Formula, taking a best result of sixth.

Rossiter ran full-time in both Super GT and Super Formula in 2014 with TOM'S and Kondō Racing. He finished third in Super GT with a pair of wins at Suzuka and Buriam and took a best finish of second at Super Formula's season opener and was sixth in the standings.

Rossiter continued his dual racing program throughout 2015 and 2016 and scored one win and four podiums with TOM'S in Super GT before racing solely in the series in 2017 after leaving Kondō Racing. He secured his final win in the series at Autopolis and finished fifth in the championship.

In 2018, Rossiter ran full-time in Super Formula with TOM'S and part-time in Super GT. He switched to Team Impul to race solely in Super GT in 2019, and scored his final podium at Okayama by finishing third.

=== World Endurance Championship ===
Before joining the FIA World Endurance Championship, Rossiter took his first steps in sportscar racing in 2008 by competing part-time in the American Le Mans Series with Andretti Green Racing. He won alongside team-mate Franck Montagny at Belle Isle and later raced at the 2011 24 Hours of Le Mans with Jetalliance Racing, driving a Lotus Evora.

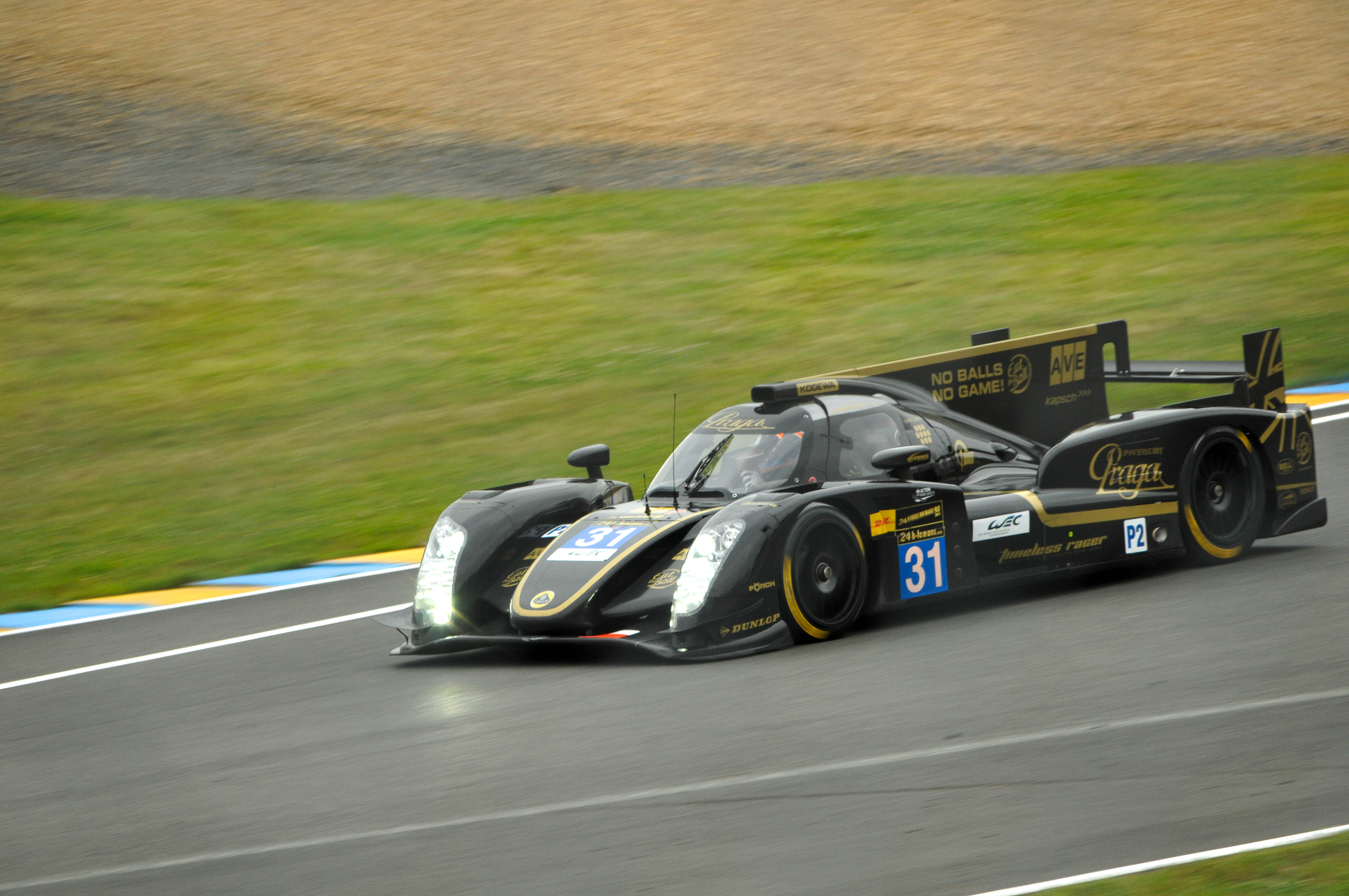
Rossiter driving the No. 31 Lotus T128 at the 2013 24 Hours of Le Mans

In 2012, Rossiter joined Lotus in the World Endurance Championship's LMP2 class. He secured a best finish of ninth at Bahrain and started from pole position at Shanghai. He continued to drive for the team part-time in 2013 and 2014.

Rossiter rejoined the ByKolles operation in 2016 and ran part-time over the next three seasons, making six appearances in LMP1 alongside one LMP2 start for G-Drive Racing in 2017.

On 8 February 2021, Rossiter was named as the simulator and reserve driver for Peugeot Sport's return to the World Endurance Championship in the Hypercar class. He was later promoted to a full-time race seat following Kevin Magnussen's return to Formula One with Haas in 2022.

Rossiter finished fourth on the Peugeot 9X8's debut at Monza and finished fifth at Fuji. On 7 October 2022, Rossiter confirmed his departure from Peugeot and announced his retirement from professional competition to join Maserati MSG Racing in Formula E as team principal.

=== Formula E ===
In 2017, Rossiter represented Venturi Racing at Formula E pre-season testing at the Circuit Ricardo Tormo in Valencia, Spain, alongside Edoardo Mortara, Maro Engel and Michael Benyahia.

==== DS Techeetah ====
After missing out on a drive for the 2017–18 season, Rossiter reunited with former Super Aguri technical director, Mark Preston, to drive for DS Techeetah in Formula E's first rookie test, at which he set the fifth-fastest time.

Rossiter was named as Techeetah's development driver for the 2018–19 season and, working with DS Automobiles, played a key role in the development of the team's championship-winning DS E-TENSE FE19 package. He returned to the cockpit for Formula E's 2019 rookie test and set the second-fastest time behind Nico Müller.

Following Formula E's fifth season, Rossiter became Techeetah's reserve driver and was also appointed to the role of sporting director after the departure of predecessor Pedro de la Rosa. At the 2020 Marrakesh ePrix, Rossiter replaced full-time driver Jean-Éric Vergne for FP1, when the reigning champion was feeling unwell.

The team went on to win both the drivers’ and teams’ Championships in the 2019–20 season. Rossiter remained in the position of reserve driver and sporting director throughout the 2020/21 and 2021/22 campaigns before leaving the team.

==== Maserati MSG Racing ====
On 7 October 2022, Rossiter joined Maserati MSG Racing as team principal following the departure of former team boss Jérôme d'Ambrosio and confirmed his retirement from professional driving. Under Rossiter's leadership, the Maserati brand scored its first world championship single-seater pole position, podium and victory since racing in Formula One in 1957.

Rossiter's role as Maserati team principal ended in October 2023.

== Racing record ==
=== Career summary ===
Season	Series	Team	Races	Wins	Poles	F/Laps	Podiums	Points	Position
2002	Formula Renault UK	Falcon Motorsport	11	0	0	0	0	103	13th
2003	Formula Renault UK	Fortec Motorsport	16	1	1	0	10	347	**3rd**
2004	British Formula 3 International Series	Fortec Motorsport	24	3	4	3	12	228	**3rd**
2004	Masters of Formula 3	Fortec Motorsport	1	0	0	0	0	N/A	4th
2004	FIA European Formula Three Cup	Fortec Motorsport	1	0	0	1	0	N/A	13th
2004	Macau Grand Prix	Signature Team	1	0	0	0	0	N/A	DNF
2004	Bahrain Superprix	Signature Team	1	0	0	0	0	N/A	4th
2004	Formula One	Lucky Strike BAR Honda	Test driver						
2005	Formula 3 Euro Series	Signature-Plus	20	1	0	0	3	51	7th
2005	Masters of Formula 3	Signature-Plus	1	0	0	0	0	N/A	DNF
2005	Formula One	Lucky Strike BAR Honda	Test driver						
2006	Formula Renault 3.5 Series	Pons Racing	17	0	0	0	1	33	14th
2006	Formula One	Lucky Strike Honda Racing F1 Team	Test driver						
2007	Formula One	Super Aguri F1	Test driver						
2008	American Le Mans Series – LMP2	Andretti Green Racing	3	1	0	0	1	39	22nd
2008	Formula One	Honda Racing F1 Team	Test driver						
2011	Le Mans Series – GTE Pro	Lotus Jetalliance	3	0	0	0	0	0	51st
2011	24 Hours of Le Mans – GTE Pro	Lotus Jetalliance	1	0	0	0	0	N/A	7th
2011	American Le Mans Series – GT	Lotus Jetalliance	1	0	0	0	0	0	NC
2012	FIA World Endurance Championship	Lotus	6	0	0	0	0	4.5	44th
2012	Formula One	Sahara Force India F1 Team	Test driver						
2013	Super GT	Petronas Team TOM'S	8	2	1	0	3	60	**3rd**
2013	Super Formula	Petronas Team TOM'S	3	0	0	0	0	2.5	16th
2013	FIA World Endurance Championship – LMP2	Lotus	3	0	0	0	0	8	25th
2013	24 Hours of Le Mans – LMP2	Lotus	1	0	0	0	0	N/A	DNF
2013	Formula One	Sahara Force India F1 Team	Test driver						
2014	Super GT	Lexus Team Petronas TOM'S	8	2	2	0	2	68	**3rd**
2014	Super Formula	Kondō Racing	9	0	0	0	1	22	9th
2014	FIA World Endurance Championship	Lotus	2	0	0	0	0	0.5	25th
2015	Super GT	Lexus Team Petronas TOM'S	8	1	0	0	2	49	7th
2015	Super Formula	Kondō Racing	8	0	0	0	0	5	12th
2016	Super GT	Lexus Team KeePer TOM'S	8	0	1	0	2	38	9th
2016	Super Formula	Kondō Racing	9	0	0	0	0	12	10th
2016	FIA World Endurance Championship	ByKolles Racing Team	2	0	0	0	0	8.5	24th
2017	Super GT	Lexus Team au TOM'S	8	1	0	1	1	53	5th
2017	FIA World Endurance Championship	ByKolles Racing Team	2	0	0	0	0	9	29th
2017	FIA World Endurance Championship – LMP2	G-Drive Racing	1	0	0	0	0	8	26th
2017–18	Formula E	Venturi Formula E Team	Test driver						
2017–18	Formula E	Techeetah	Test driver						
2018	Super Formula	Vantelin Team TOM'S	6	0	0	1	0	0	17th
2018	Super GT	Lexus Team au TOM'S	1	0	0	0	0	8	18th
2018	Super GT	Lexus Team LeMans Wako's	1	0	0	0	0	8	18th
2018–19	FIA World Endurance Championship	ByKolles Racing Team	2	0	0	0	0	10	26th
2018–19	Formula E	DS Techeetah	Development driver						
2019	Super GT	Team Impul	7	0	0	0	1	17.5	13th
2019–20	Formula E	DS Techeetah	Reserve driver						
2020–21	Formula E	DS Techeetah	Reserve driver						
2021–22	Formula E	DS Techeetah	Reserve driver						
2022	FIA World Endurance Championship – Hypercar	Peugeot TotalEnergies	2	0	0	0	0	22	8th

=== Complete Formula Renault 2.0 UK Championship results ===
(key) (Races in bold indicate pole position) (Races in italics indicate fastest lap)

Year	Entrant	1	2	3	4	5	6	7	8	9	10	11	12	13	14	15	16	17	DC	Points
2002	Falcon Motorsport	BRH; 14	OUL; 17	THR; 4	SIL; 12	THR; Ret	BRH; 10	CRO; Ret	SNE; 15	SNE; 6	KNO; 7	BRH; 11	DON	DON					13th	103
2003	Fortec Motorsport	SNE; 1; 3	SNE; 2; 4	BRH; 5	**THR**; 1	SIL; 3	ROC; 2	CRO; 1 Ret	CRO; 2; 2	DON; 1; 3	DON; 2; 3	SNE; 2	BRH; 1; 3	BRH; 2; 4	DON; 1; 2	DON; 2; 24	OUL; 1 DNS	OUL; 2; 8	3rd	347

=== Complete British Formula Three Championship results ===
(key) (Races in bold indicate pole position) (Races in italics indicate fastest lap)

Year	Entrant	Chassis	Engine	1	2	3	4	5	6	7	8	9	10	11	12	13	14	15	16	17	18	19	20	21	22	23	24	25	DC	Points
2004	Fortec Motorsport	Dallara F304	Opel	DON; 1; 3	DON; 2; 8	**SIL**; **1**; 1	SIL; 2 C	CRO; 1; 2	CRO; 2 Ret	KNO; 1; 3	**KNO**; **2**; 1	SNE; 1 Ret	SNE; 2 Ret	**SNE**; **3**; 2	CAS; 1; 8	CAS; 2; 5	DON; 1; 3	DON; 2; 6	OUL; 1; 5	OUL; 2; 3	SIL; 1; 2	SIL; 2; 7	**THR**; **1**; 2	THR; 2; 4	SPA; 1; 18	SPA; 2; 13	BRH; 1; 1	BRH; 2; 2	3rd	228

=== Complete Formula 3 Euro Series results ===
(key) (Races in bold indicate pole position) (Races in italics indicate fastest lap)

Year	Entrant	Chassis	Engine	1	2	3	4	5	6	7	8	9	10	11	12	13	14	15	16	17	18	19	20	DC	Points
2005	Signature-Plus	Dallara F305	Mercedes	HOC; 1; 4	HOC; 2; 1	PAU; 1; 3	PAU; 2; 4	SPA; 1; 2	SPA; 2; 8	MCO; 1; 4	MCO; 2; 4	OSC; 1; 15	OSC; 2; 13	NOR; 1 Ret	NOR; 2; 7	NÜR; 1; 10	NÜR; 2 Ret	ZAN; 1 Ret	ZAN; 2; 10	LAU; 1; 18	LAU; 2; 14	HOC; 1; 5	HOC; 2; 9	7th	51

=== Complete Formula Renault 3.5 Series results ===
(key) (Races in bold indicate pole position) (Races in italics indicate fastest lap)

Year	Entrant	1	2	3	4	5	6	7	8	9	10	11	12	13	14	15	16	17	DC	Points
2006	Pons Racing	ZOL; 1; 5	ZOL; 2 Ret	MON; 1; 2	IST; 1 Ret	IST; 2; 5	MIS; 1; 9	MIS; 2; 6	SPA; 1 Ret	SPA; 2; 24	NÜR; 1 Ret	NÜR; 2 Ret	DON; 1 Ret	DON; 2 Ret	LMS; 1; 16	LMS; 2; 17	CAT; 1; 9	CAT; 2 Ret	14th	33

=== Complete American Le Mans Series results ===
Year	Entrant	Class	Chassis	Engine	1	2	3	4	5	6	7	8	9	10	11	Rank	Points	Ref
2008	Andretti Green Racing	LMP2	Acura ARX-01b	Acura 3.4L V8	SEB	STP	LBH	UTA	LIM	MDO	RDA; 7	MOS; 4	DET; 1	PET	MON	22nd	39	
2011	Lotus Jetalliance	GT	Lotus Evora GTE	Toyota (Cosworth) 4.0 L V6	SEB	LNB	LIM	MOS	MID	AME	BAL	MON	PET; NC			NC	–	

=== 24 Hours of Le Mans results ===
Year	Team	Co-Drivers	Car	Class	Laps	Pos.	Class Pos.
2011	(Austria) Lotus Jetalliance	(Switzerland) Jonathan Hirschi (United Kingdom) Johnny Mowlem	Lotus Evora GTE	GTE; Pro	295	22nd	7th
2013	(Germany) Lotus	(France) Christophe Bouchut (United States) Kevin Weeda	Lotus T128	LMP2	17	DNF	DNF

=== Complete FIA World Endurance Championship results ===
(key) (Races in bold indicate pole position; races in italics indicate fastest lap)

Year	Entrant	Class	Chassis	Engine	1	2	3	4	5	6	7	8	9	Rank	Points
2012	Lotus	LMP2	Lola B12/80	Lotus 3.6 L V8	SEB	SPA; 29	LMS	SIL; Ret	SÃO; 13	BHR; 9	FUJ; 12	SHA; Ret		44th	4.5
2013	Lotus	LMP2	Lotus T128	Praga Judd 3.6 L V8	SIL	SPA; 6	LMS; Ret	SÃO	COA; DNS	FUJ; 10	SHA	BHR		25th	8
2014	Lotus	LMP1	CLM P1/01	AER P60 Turbo V6	SIL	SPA	LMS	COA; 15	FUJ; Ret	SHA	BHR	SÃO		25th	0.5
2016	ByKolles Racing Team	LMP1	CLM P1/01	AER P60 2.4 L Turbo V6	SIL; 14	SPA; 6	LMS	NÜR	MEX	COA	FUJ	SHA	BHR	24th	8.5
2017	ByKolles Racing Team	LMP1	ENSO CLM P1/01	Nismo VRX30A 3.0 L Turbo V6	SIL; Ret	SPA; 6	LMS	NÜR	MEX	COA				29th	9
2017	G-Drive Racing	LMP2	Oreca 07	Gibson GK428 4.2 L V8							FUJ; 6	SHA	BHR	26th	8
2018–19	ByKolles Racing Team	LMP1	ENSO CLM P1/01	Nismo VRX30A 3.0 L Turbo V6	SPA	LMS	SIL	FUJ; 5	SHA; Ret	SEB	SPA	LMS		26th	10
2022	Peugeot TotalEnergies	Hypercar	Peugeot 9X8	Peugeot 2.6 L Turbo V6	SEB	SPA	LMS	MNZ; 4	FUJ; 5	BHR				8th	22

=== Complete Super GT results ===
(key) (Races in bold indicate pole position; races in italics indicate fastest lap)

Year	Team	Car	Class	1	2	3	4	5	6	7	8	DC	Points
2013	Lexus Team Petronas TOM'S	Lexus SC430	GT500	OKA; 12	**FUJ**; 1	SEP; 11	SUG; 10	SUZ; 3	FUJ; 12	AUT; 1	MOT; 5	3rd	60
2014	Lexus Team Petronas TOM'S	Lexus RC F	GT500	OKA; 13	FUJ; 9	AUT; 5	**SUG**; 4	FUJ; 5	**SUZ**; 1	BUR; 1	MOT; 10	3rd	68
2015	Lexus Team Petronas TOM'S	Lexus RC F	GT500	OKA; 14	FUJ; 3	CHA; 8	FUJ; 7	SUZ; 1	SUG; 13	AUT; 5	MOT; Ret	7th	49
2016	Lexus Team KeePer TOM'S	Lexus RC F	GT500	**OKA**; 2	FUJ; 3	SUG; 8	FUJ; 12	SUZ; Ret	CHA; 9	MOT; Ret	MOT; 5	9th	38
2017	Lexus Team au TOM's	Lexus LC 500	GT500	OKA; 5	FUJ; 5	AUT; 1	SUG; 7	FUJ; 4	SUZ; 9	BUR; 5	MOT; 14	5th	53
2018	Lexus Team au TOM's	Lexus LC 500	GT500	OKA	FUJ; 4							18th	8
2018	Lexus Team LeMans Wako's	Lexus LC 500	GT500			SUZ; 12	CHA	FUJ	SUG	AUT	MOT	18th	8
2019	Team Impul	Nissan GT-R	GT500	OKA; 3‡	FUJ; 12	SUZ; 10	BUR; 8	FUJ; 5	AUT	SUG; 14	MOT; Ret	13th	17.5

^{‡} Half points awarded as less than 75% of race distance was completed.

=== Complete Super Formula results ===
(key) (Races in bold indicate pole position; races in italics indicate fastest lap)

Year	Team	Engine	1	2	3	4	5	6	7	8	9	DC	Points
2013	Petronas Team TOM'S	Toyota	SUZ; 11	AUT	FUJ	MOT	SUG	SUZ; 7	SUZ; 6			16th	2.5
2014	Kondo Racing	Toyota	SUZ; 2	FUJ; 6	FUJ; 17	FUJ; 8	MOT; 8	AUT; 5	SUG; 4	SUZ; 6	SUZ; 10	6th	22
2015	Kondo Racing	Toyota	SUZ; 16	OKA; Ret	FUJ; 7	MOT; 12	AUT; 6	SUG; 14	SUZ; Ret	SUZ; Ret		12th	5
2016	Kondo Racing	Toyota	SUZ; 6	OKA; 9	FUJ; 5	MOT; 5	OKA; 9	OKA; 10	SUG; 8	SUZ; 12	SUZ; 15	10th	12
2018	Vantelin Team TOM'S	Toyota	SUZ; 11	AUT; C	SUG; Ret	FUJ; 19	MOT; 9	OKA; 11	SUZ; Ret			17th	0

=== Complete Formula E results ===
(key) (Races in bold indicate pole position; races in italics indicate fastest lap)

Year	Team	Chassis	Powertrain	1	2	3	4	5	6	7	8	9	10	11	Pos	Points
2019–20	DS Techeetah	Spark SRT05e	DS E-TENSE FE20	DIR	DIR	SCL	MEX	MRK; PO	BER	BER	BER	BER	BER	BER	–	–
