= 2016 6 Hours of Silverstone =

5th edition of sports car endurance race held at Silverstone Circuit

Track layout of the Silverstone Circuit

The 2016 6 Hours of Silverstone was a six-hour endurance sports car racing event held for Le Mans Prototype and Le Mans Grand Touring Endurance cars at the Silverstone Circuit in Northamptonshire, England on 15–17 April 2016. Silverstone served as the opening round of the 2016 FIA World Endurance Championship, and was the fifth running of the event as part of the championship. A total of 52,000 people attended the race weekend.

Audi's No. 7 car of André Lotterer, Marcel Fässler and Benoît Tréluyer won the pole position and maintained their advantage on the race's first lap. Lotterer initially pulled away from the field but lost the lead to Mark Webber in Porsche's No. 1 car who remained in the position. Co-driver Brendon Hartley remained in first until he retired following heavy contact with Michael Wainwright in the No. 86 Gulf Racing car. This handed the lead to Neel Jani in the sister No. 2 car, but it switched again to Tréluyer when Jani's co-driver Marc Lieb was delayed by a slower vehicle. Although he was challenged by Lieb after being blocked by slower cars Tréluyer pulled away from him and the No. 7 Audi maintained its advantage over the No. 2 Porsche for the majority of the remainder of the event to finish the race first. However the No. 7 Audi was disqualified when scrutineers discovered that its front skid block was worn out by more than the regulations allowed for, handing the victory to Lieb, Jani and Romain Dumas. Toyota No. 5 drivers Stéphane Sarrazin, Mike Conway and Kamui Kobayashi finished in second and Dominik Kraihamer, Alexandre Imperatori and Mathéo Tuscher came in third to secure Rebellion Racing's first podium in the series since 2013.

The Le Mans Prototype 2 (LMP2) category was won by the No. 43 RGR Sport by Morand car of Bruno Senna, Filipe Albuquerque and Ricardo González. Senna took the lead in the event's closing stages and earned him and Albuquerque their first World Endurance Championship class victories and González's fourth. Sam Bird and Davide Rigon in the No. 71 AF Corse Ferrari were unchallenged throughout the race and took the victory in the Le Mans Grand Touring Professional (LMGTE Pro) class ahead of their teammates Gianmaria Bruni and James Calado in the sister Ferrari who served a three-minute stop-and-go penalty for an engine change after qualifying. The Le Mans Grand Touring Amateur (LMGTE Am) category was led throughout the final stages by François Perrodo, Emmanuel Collard and Rui Águas who won their first race of the season in the No. 83 AF Corse Ferrari with a one-lap advantage over the second-placed No. 98 Aston Martin of Paul Dalla Lana, Mathias Lauda and Pedro Lamy.

The result meant Lieb, Jani and Dumas became the leaders of the Drivers' Championship with 25 points, seven ahead of their nearest rivals Sarrazin, Conway and Kobayashi, and a further three in front of Kraihamer, Imperatori and Piquet. Their teammates Nico Prost, Nick Heidfeld and Nelson Piquet Jr. were fourth on 12 points with Senna, Albuquerque and González rounding out the top five with ten points. Toyota claimed the Manufacturers' Championship lead with 33 points, eight ahead of their rival Porsche in second; the third-placed manufacturer Audi had scored one point with eight races left in the season.

== Background ==
=== Entrants ===
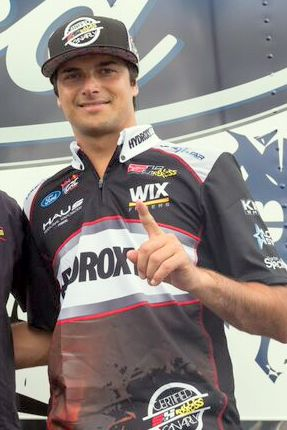
Nelson Piquet Jr. (pictured in 2015) replaced Mathias Beche for the season's first three rounds.

A total of thirty-three cars were officially entered for the 6 Hours of Silverstone with the bulk of the entries in Le Mans Prototype 1 (LMP1) and Le Mans Prototype 2 (LMP2). The 2015 race winners, Audi Sport Team Joest, returned to defend their title. Three manufacturers, Porsche, Toyota and Audi Sport Team Joest, were represented in LMP1 by two cars each. Rebellion Racing and ByKolles Racing were the two representatives of the LMP1 privateer teams. Super Formula and Super GT driver James Rossiter returned to sports car racing in the No. 4 ByKolles Racing entry, replacing Pierre Kaffer who had other motor racing commitments for the season's first two races. 2014–15 Formula E champion Nelson Piquet Jr. took over from Mathias Beche and joined fellow racers Nick Heidfeld and Nico Prost in Rebellion Racing's No. 12 car for the season's first three rounds. LMP2 consisted of 11 cars with 32 drivers in five different types of chassis. Manor made its début in the series at Silverstone with a two-car entry, fielding Will Stevens, James Jakes and Tor Graves in its first vehicle, along with Matt Rao, Richard Bradley and Roberto Merhi in the team's second entry. David Markozov was scheduled to take part at Silverstone in the No. 27 SMP Racing BR Engineering BR01 car but was unable to participate because of family problems.

The Le Mans Grand Touring Endurance Professional (LMGTE Pro) field consisted of four manufacturers (Aston Martin, Ford, Ferrari and Porsche), while the Le Mans Grand Touring Endurance Amateur (LMGTE Am) entrants were six teams: Aston Martin Racing, AF Corse, KCMG, Larbre Compétition, Abu Dhabi-Proton Racing and Gulf Racing. Ford Chip Ganassi Racing entered the series, fielding two full-time Ford GT vehicles driven by Andy Priaulx, Marino Franchitti, Harry Tincknell in its No. 67 entry and Olivier Pla, Stefan Mücke and Billy Johnson behind the wheel of the No. 66 car. Patrick Long was committed to participating in the Pirelli World Challenge event on the Streets of Long Beach and was replaced by Klaus Bachler in the No. 88 Abu Dhabi-Proton Racing Porsche 911 RSR, joining the team's regular drivers David Heinemeier Hansson and Khaled Al Qubaisi. Gulf Racing made their first appearance in the series with 2008–09 A1 Grand Prix driver Adam Carroll, Porsche Supercup podium finisher Ben Barker and the team's co-founder Michael Wainwright.

=== Preview ===
The 6 Hours of Silverstone was confirmed as part of the FIA World Endurance Championship's 2016 schedule in December 2015 at a meeting of the FIA World Motor Sport Council in Paris. It was the first of nine scheduled endurance sports car rounds of the 2016 FIA World Endurance Championship, and the fifth running of the event as part of the championship. The race was held on 17 April 2016 at the Silverstone Circuit in Northamptonshire, England with two preceding days of practice and qualifying. The Silverstone Circuit is a race track that is 5.891 km (3.660 mi) long and is composed of 18 corners in varying degrees of sharpness, ranging from gentle sweeping turns to one sharp hairpin.

Heading into the new season, co-defending World Endurance champion Mark Webber stated Porsche's performance advantage over their two main rivals could possibly disappear at Silverstone but felt the team could successfully retain the drivers' and manufacturers' titles. He said his team's expectations were ambitious. Although Webber was aware of the tight opposition he was confident that Porsche could fight well: "We have a very stable concept, let’s say, so it’s very well known for us. We of course want to aim for another win at Le Mans and win the championships, so the goals are very, very high." Audi No. 8 co-driver Lucas di Grassi believed that Toyota's new chassis, the TS050 Hybrid, would allow its drivers to run at the front of the field after they experienced a difficult 2015 season: "I expect them to make a big step, because they have changed the engine and the hybrid system. They are a good team, they won the championship in 2014. They will be strong."

== Practice ==
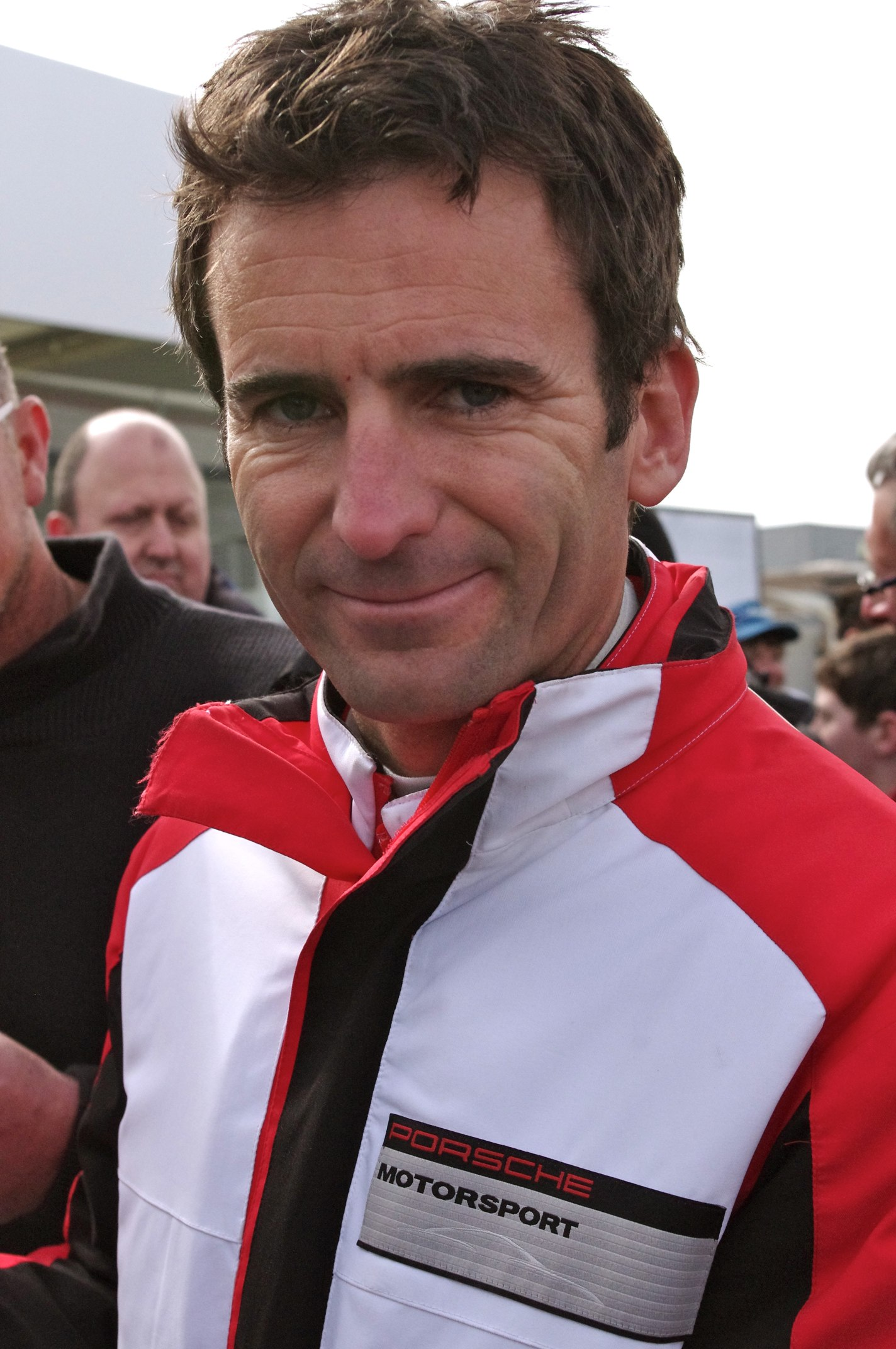
Romain Dumas (pictured in 2014) beached his car in the turn seven gravel trap in the second practice session.

There were three practice sessions—one 90-minute session each on Friday morning and afternoon and a third one-hour session on Saturday morning—were scheduled to precede Sunday's race. The first session was held on a wet track from earlier morning rain and lap times reduced as the 90-minute period progressed due to the track drying out. No incidents were reported. Timo Bernhard in the No. 1 Porsche led the practice session in its final minutes with a lap time of 1:42.182, eight-tenths of a second faster than Marc Lieb in the sister entry. René Rast in G-Drive Racing's No. 26 Oreca 05 Nissan led LMP2 with a fastest lap of 1: 51.617 set in the session's final 15 minutes. The No. 51 AF Corse car driven by Gianmaria Bruni was fastest in LMGTE Pro while Rui Águas in the sister team's No. 83 entry helped the Italian marque to be the fastest vehicle in LMGTE Am.

In the second practice session, which took place in dry weather conditions for most of the 90-minute period and became wet when rain fell in the closing stages which prevented any drivers from improving on their fastest times, Brendon Hartley in Porsche's No. 1 car set an early lap time of 1:39.655 which remained the fastest time for the remainder of the session. He was 1.6 seconds quicker than Romain Dumas in the team's No. 2 entry, who in turn, was two-tenths of a second faster than Loïc Duval in the No. 8 Audi. A LMGTE car impacted Dumas, causing him to spin into the turn seven gravel trap, and sustained damage to his car's right-rear tyre, causing the deployment of a full course yellow flag. He was extracted from the gravel trap and drove back to the pit lane for car repairs. Jonny Kane in the No. 36 Signatech Alpine was the fastest driver in LMP2 with a 1:49.632 lap set in the session's closing minutes, nearly one-tenth of a second in front of Jakes. LMGTE Pro was led by James Calado in the No. 51 AF Corse Ferrari 488 GTE, while Carroll's Gulf Racing car was fastest in LMGTE Am, despite driving off the track in the session's closing minutes.

The third (and final) practice session started with a morning sleet shower and Anthony Davidson in Toyota's No. 5 entry drove off the circuit at Luffield turn. Davidson later aquaplaned backwards off the track and into the Chapel corner gravel trap. The session was stopped to allow the stricken Toyota to be extracted from the gravel trap and it was able to return to the pit lane with assistance from a recovery crane, allowing on-track action to recommence. Sleet later turned to snow necessitating track officials to stop the session for the second time. Driver adviser Yannick Dalmas was asked to assess the track's condition during the stoppage and gave feedback that prompted the session's premature end with half an hour remaining. Eleven cars took to the track but nobody recorded a timed lap. Tincknell completed the most out-laps of any driver in the session with three.

== Qualifying ==
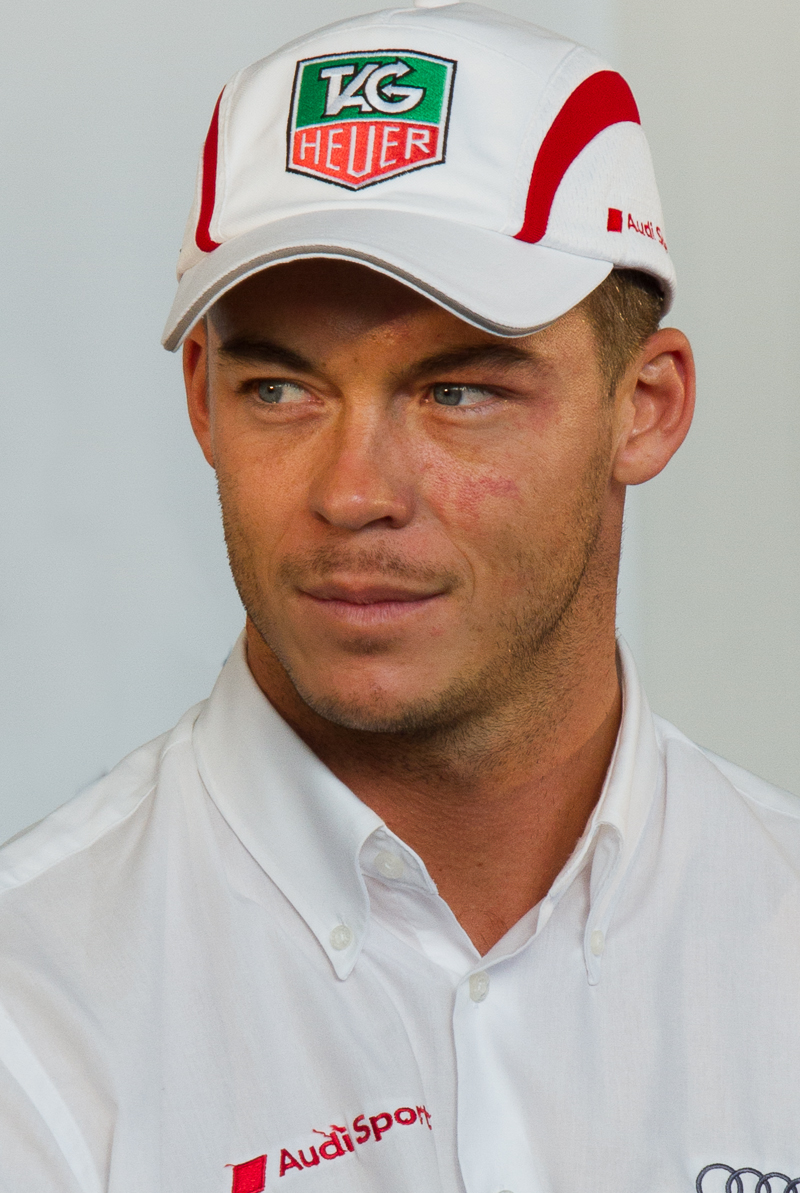
André Lotterer (pictured in 2012) helped secure Audi's first World Endurance Championship pole position since 2013.

Saturday's late afternoon qualification session was divided into two groups lasting 25 minutes each. Cars in LMGTE Pro and AM were sent out first and, after a five-minute interval, LMP1 and LMP2 vehicles drove onto the track. All cars were required to be driven by two participants for one timed lap each and the starting order was determined by the competitor's fastest average times. The fastest qualifier was awarded one point which went towards the Drivers' and Manufacturers' Championships. The session started on a wet track but dried out as it progressed. André Lotterer and Marcel Fässler in the No. 7 Audi clinched the vehicle's first pole position of the season, and the team's first since the 2013 6 Hours of Fuji, with an average lap time of 1:53.204. Manor's No. 44 car made contact with Fässler at the end of the session but both vehicles sustained no apparent damage. It also ended Porsche's streak of 11 consecutive pole positions, extending back to the 2014 6 Hours of Shanghai. They were joined on the grid's front row by the team's No. 8 sister entry. Di Grassi recorded the fastest qualifying timed lap late in the session but went off the track heading into Vale corner while attempting to go faster. He went into the turn's gravel trap, preventing him from achieving the pole position. The two Porsche cars were third and fourth (the No. 1 vehicle in front of the No. 2 entry). Hartley was delayed by slower traffic on his final timed lap and believed he could have improved on his time. Toyota's entrants had unsuitable car control settings and a different vehicle set-up, restricting to them to qualifying on the grid's third row (their No. 5 car ahead of the No. 6 entry). Oliver Webb and Rossiter in the ByKolles Racing CLM P1/01 and the two Rebellion Racing cars rounded out the LMP1 field; Rebellion elected not to record any lap times.

In LMP2, Rast used intermediate tyres before making a pit stop for full wet tyres and recorded a lap time of 2:07.374 which gave him and co-driver Roman Rusinov a pole-setting two-lap average time of 2:08.479. The two drivers were 1.1 seconds faster than the second-place class qualifier, the No. 31 Extreme Speed Motorsports Ligier JS P2 of Pipo Derani and Chris Cumming. Derani set the category's fastest individual lap which was 0.059 second's faster than Rast. The No. 43 RGR Sport team qualified in third with both SMP Racing cars rounding out the top five LMP2 qualifiers. Sam Bird and Davide Rigon, competing in the No. 71 AF Corse Ferrari, were the fastest LMGTE Pro drivers with a two-lap average time of 2:12.440. They qualified 1.3 seconds in front of Richard Lietz and Michael Christensen in Dempsey-Proton Racing's No. 77 Porsche. Mücke and Pla in Ford Chip Ganassi Racing's No. 66 car took third despite Pla going into the Stowe corner gravel trap late in the session. Their sister No. 67 GT and the KCMG Porsche rounded out the top five class qualifiers. Calado recorded a time of 2:11.589, and, after Bruni got into the car, he was unable to record a lap time and returned to a pit lane with an engine bay technical issue and started from the back of the overall field. Bachler and Khaled Al Qubaisi took the pole position in LMGTE Am, their first in the series, 2.297 seconds ahead of the second-place qualifier, KCMG's No. 78 car. Paolo Ruberti in Larbre Competition's No. 50 Chevrolet Corvette C7.R held the class pole position in the early part of the session but the team fell to third following the handover to co-driver Yutaka Yamagishi.

=== Qualifying results ===
Pole position winners in each class are indicated in bold.

Final qualifying classification
Pos	Class	Team	Average Time	Gap	Grid
1	**LMP1**	**No. 7 Audi Sport Team Joest**	**1:53.204**	—	**1**
2	LMP1	No. 8 Audi Sport Team Joest	1:53.308	+0.104	2
3	LMP1	No. 1 Porsche Team	1:54.150	+0.946	3
4	LMP1	No. 2 Porsche Team	1:54.266	+1.062	4
5	LMP1	No. 6 Toyota Racing	1:58.200	+4.996	5
6	LMP1	No. 5 Toyota Racing	2:00.109	+6.905	6
7	LMP1	No. 4 ByKolles Racing Team	2:08.322	+15.128	7
8	**LMP2**	**No. 26 G-Drive Racing**	**2:08.479**	**+15.275**	**8**
9	LMP2	No. 31 Extreme Speed Motorsports	2:09.632	+16.428	9
10	LMP2	No. 43 RGR Sport by Morand	2:10.295	+17.091	10
11	LMP2	No. 27 SMP Racing	2:10.627	+17.423	11
12	LMP2	No. 37 SMP Racing	2:11.023	+17.819	12
13	LMP2	No. 45 Manor	2:11.893	+18.689	13
14	LMP2	No. 36 Signatech Alpine	2:12.221	+19.017	14
15	**LMGTE Pro**	**No. 71 AF Corse**	**2:12.440**	**+19.236**	**15**
16	LMP2	No. 44 Manor	2:13.105	+19.901	16
17	LMP2	No. 42 Strakka Racing	2:13.729	+20.525	17
18	LMGTE Pro	No. 77 Dempsey-Proton Racing	2:13.822	+20.618	18
19	LMGTE Pro	No. 66 Ford Chip Ganassi Team UK	2:14.475	+21.271	19
20	LMP2	No. 35 Baxi DC Racing Alpine	2:14.863	+21.659	20
21	**LMGTE Am**	**No. 88 Abu Dhabi-Proton Racing**	**2:15.102**	**+21.898**	**21**
22	LMGTE Pro	No. 67 Ford Chip Ganassi Team UK	2:17.367	+24.163	22
23	LMGTE Am	No. 78 KCMG	2:17.399	+24.195	23
24	LMGTE Am	No. 50 Larbre Compétition	2:02.937	+25.140	24
25	LMGTE Am	No. 86 Gulf Racing	2:19.084	+25.880	25
26	LMGTE Am	No. 83 AF Corse	2:20.131	+26.927	26
27	LMP2	No. 30 Extreme Speed Motorsports	2:20.410	+27.206	27
28	LMGTE Pro	No. 97 Aston Martin Racing	2:21.091	+27.887	28
29	LMGTE Pro	No. 95 Aston Martin Racing	2:22.252	+29.048	29
30	LMGTE Am	No. 98 Aston Martin Racing	2:23.005	+29.801	30
31	LMP1	No. 12 Rebellion Racing	2:08.322	+14.637	31
32	LMGTE Pro	No. 51 AF Corse	2:11.589	+18.385	32
33	LMP1	No. 13 Rebellion Racing	No Time	—	33

== Race ==
Weather conditions at the start of the event were dry and sunny. The air temperature throughout the race was between 8.4 to 11.5 °C (47.1 to 52.7 °F) with a track temperature ranging from 6.6 to 14.5 °C (43.9 to 58.1 °F); although conditions were expected to remain consistent throughout the race, the possibility of a late rain shower was forecast. 52,000 people attended the race weekend. The race began at 12:00 British Summer Time (UTC+01:00) with actor Patrick Dempsey having the honour of waving the green flag. Lotterer maintained his pole position advantage going into the first corner. Jarvis behind him held second place, but came under pressure from Webber. Derani immediately attacked Rusinov and moved to the lead of LMP2 after overtaking him under braking at Brooklands corner. Sébastien Buemi overtook Toyota teammate Mike Conway to move into fifth place but the latter retook the position three minutes later. Webber set the race's fastest lap so far, at 1:30.309, to run one second behind Jarvis. Jarvis was delayed by a slower car and Webber passed him for second. Jarvis then fended off a challenge from Dumas for third. Lotterer used the battle to increase his advantage to five seconds while Stevens and Vitaly Petrov impacted each other while battling for fifth in LMP2.

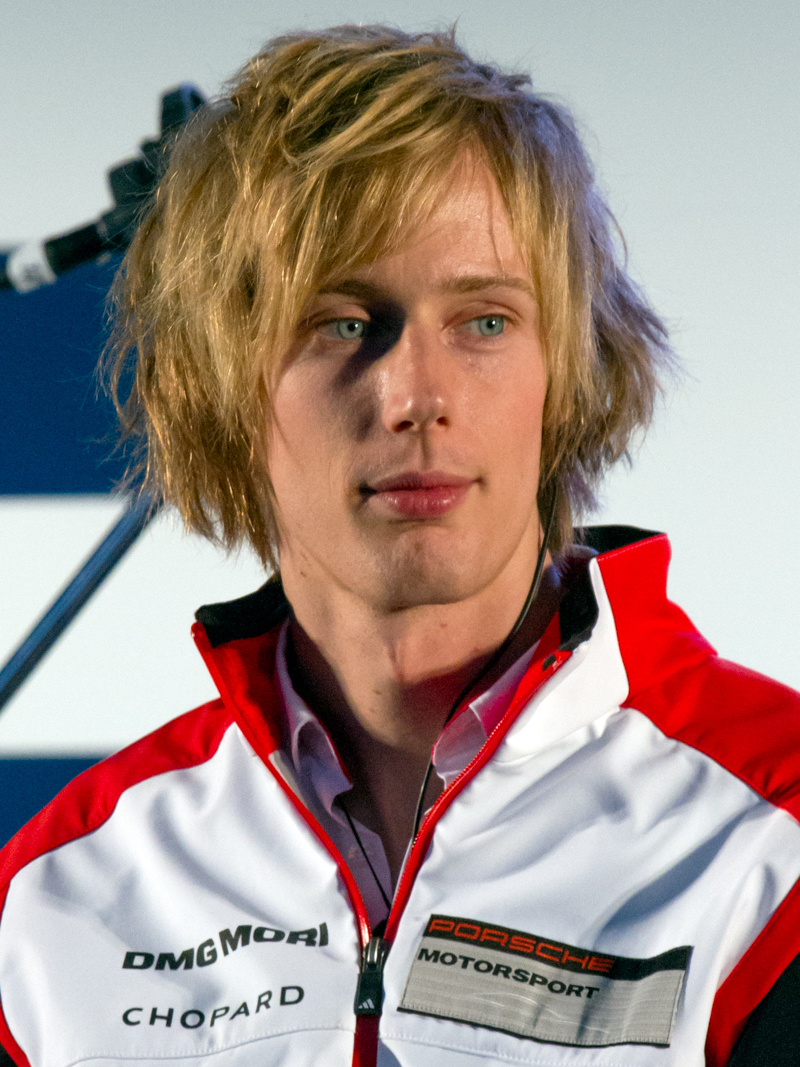
Brendon Hartley (pictured in 2014) held the No. 1 Porsche's lead until he retired because of heavy contact with Michael Wainwright.

Buemi moved back ahead of Conway in the battle for fifth, while Lotterer was impeded by an LMP2 and LMGTE car at Becketts corner and Webber was delayed by the two vehicles at Stowe corner. Jarvis came across the two slower cars at Copse corner and narrowly held off an overtaking manoeuvre from Dumas. The Audi moved across the track at Becketts corner upon coming across more slower traffic. Webber caught Lotterer and after closing up to him through Club corner. While lapping Rossiter, Webber moved to the front of the race heading into Abbey corner. Webber began to pull away from Lotterer. Jarvis was delayed by Rossiter, allowing Dumas to attack but went into grass on the Wellington straight. After making contact Bruno Senna overtook Rusinov driving into Maggots corner for second place in LMP2. The first round of pit stops began after 37 minutes with Derani making a pit stop, promoting Senna into the LMP2 lead. Jarvis was the first of the overall leaders to make a pit stop for fuel and tyres and was followed by teammate Lotterer one minute later. Dumas and both Toyota cars made stops with Jani taking over from Dumas and Kamui Kobayashi switched positions with Conway. Webber stopped one lap later and Hartley climbed aboard the No. 1 Porsche.

After the pit stops Hartley remained the leader in the No. 1 Porsche while Jarvis moved in front of Lotterer because the latter had a longer pit stop. Cumming lost control of the No. 31 Extreme Speed Motorsports Ligier driving into Club corner after encountering a LMGTE Ferrari, went across grass, and spun at the turn's center, allowing Rusinov to move into the lead of LMP2 and Ricardo González took over second. The LMGTE field began making pit stops after 52 minutes when Darren Turner drove the No. 95 Aston Martin into his pit box while Fernando Rees in the sister No. 97 car was issued with a stop-and-go penalty for exceeding track limits. Both Ford cars moved into second and third in LMGTE Pro when the No. 77 Porsche had only fuel placed inside it. Turner overtook Priaulx for fourth place in LMGTE Pro while Christensen moved ahead of Mücke for second position in the category at Stowe corner. Merhi went wide at Copse corner, which allowed Nelson Panciatici to take advantage, and he overtook Merhi for fifth in LMP2. Kane passed González to move into second in the category. Panciatici heavily out-braked Cumming to claim fourth place while Piquet lost control of his car in an attempt to overtake the defensive Rossiter who kept eighth position.

While coming across the Piquet and Rossiter battle Lotterer moved in front of teammate Jarvis to claim second place. Rusinov entered the pit lane from the LMP2 lead for left-rear bodywork repairs and Rast was handed the No. 26 Oreca. Piquet was able to pass Rossiter for eighth position overall while Turner moved ahead of the other Ford car to run in third in LMGTE Pro. The second round of pit stops began one minute later when Jarvis entered the pit lane and the remainder of the LMP1 field followed in response for driver changes. Benoît Tréluyer pushed hard and lost control of his car's back-end at Vale corner, allowing Jani to move into second position. Christensen's right-front tyre was punctured at Becketts corner because of a partial failure of the front-right suspension and he made a 14-minute pit stop for a replacement wheel which promoted Turner to second in the class. After changing drivers in the No. 42 Strakka Racing Gibson, Danny Watts overtook González at Brooklands corner for second position in LMP2. Hartley went to the outside of Wainwright driving through Farm Curve and his car's right-front quarter made contact with Wainwright's left-rear section. Hartley went over the bonnet of the No. 86 Porsche but avoided flipping over; both cars went off the track, skidding across the gravel trap, and into the barriers at the end of the Complex. Both Hartley and Wainwright retired and a full course yellow flag was necessitated to allow the cars to be extracted from the track.

The incident allowed Jani to move into the lead but di Grassi stopped at Farm Curve with a hybrid system issue, causing him to switch off the front-axle motor generator unit shortly afterwards. His team's mechanics were allowed to tend to the Audi after travelling via a course car, extending the full course yellow as it was tended to. Di Grassi's race ended prematurely and a mechanic used a fire extinguisher to extinguish smoke bellowing from his car. The race resumed after 23 minutes with Tréluyer attacking Lieb. Upon being delayed by the No. 13 Rebellion Racing car of Dominik Kraihamer on the kerbing at Copse turn, Tréluyer overtook Lieb to move into the lead on the approach to Maggots corner and pulled away on the Hangar straight. Rast stopped on the grass at the entrance of Maggots corner with a fuel pump pressure failure, causing him to lose the LMP2 lead to Watts and rejoined in third place in class. Rast recovered and passed Senna for second in LMP2 by using the grass at Stowe corner. Tréluyer was blocked by slower traffic allowing Lieb to close up to him on the Wellington straight. Lieb could not overtake because he was delayed by a pack of LMP2 cars. Meanwhile, Rast closed up to Watts and overtook him to retake the LMP2 lead. Tréluyer and Lieb ran closely between each other before the former pulled away from Lieb.

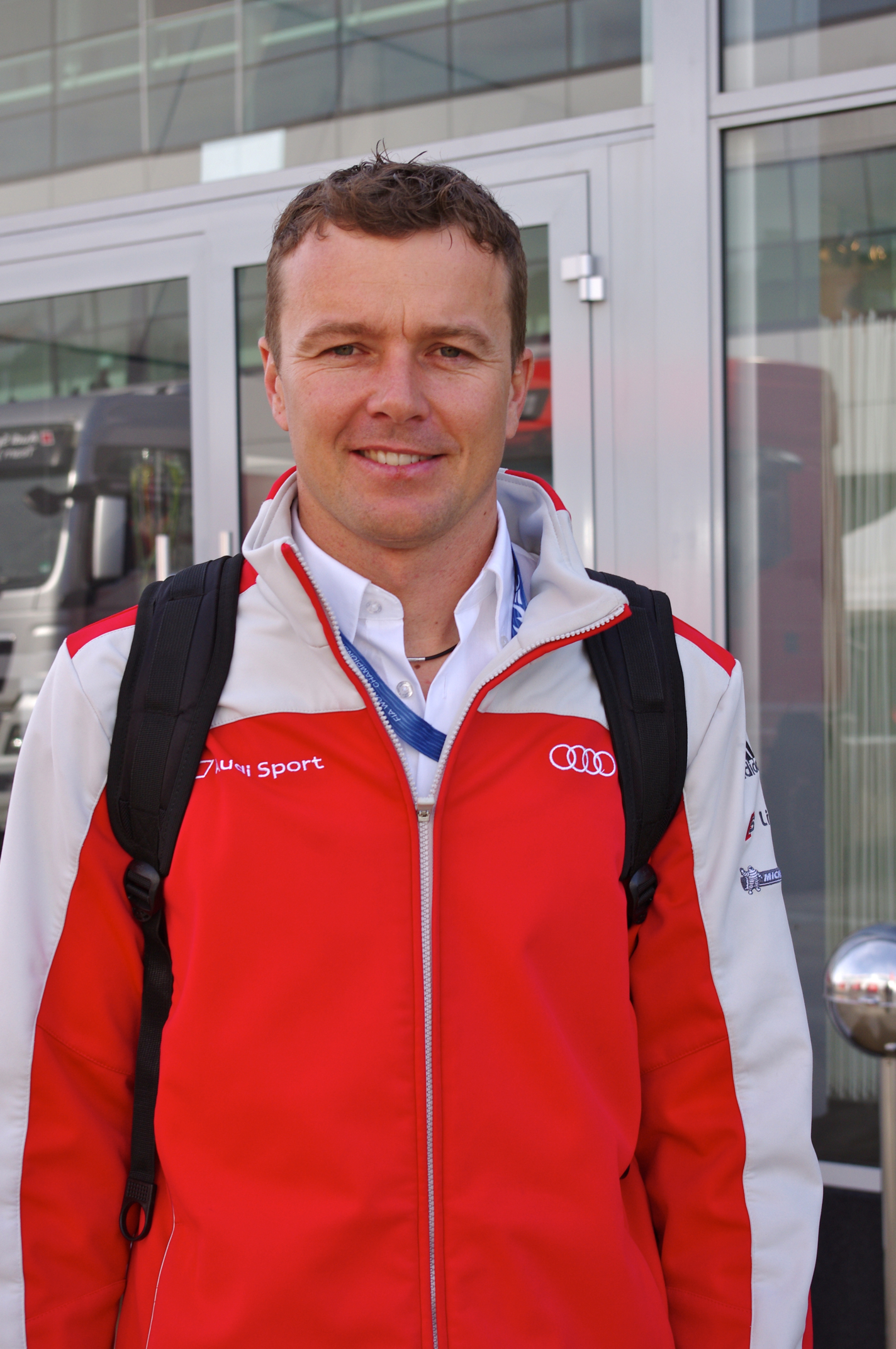
Marcel Fässler (pictured in 2013) helped Audi finish the race first before they were disqualified for a technical infringement.

Another round of green flag pit stops commenced after three hours and eight minutes with Tréluyer being the first of the leaders to stop with both Toyota cars following two minutes later. The safety car was deployed when Nakajima's right-front tyre failed on the Wellington straight following contact with a LMGTE car and debris from his Toyota was littered on the track. Nakajima pulled over to the side of the circuit at Brooklands corner and stopped because the flailing tyre rubber broke a driveshaft, forcing Nakajima to use the front-axle motor–generator for half a lap. Marshals were required to remove on-track debris. The safety car drove into the pit lane 12 minutes later and racing resumed with Tréluyer remaining in first and Lieb second. Nakajima's car was transported back into his garage for repairs. Dumas turned into Franchitti's Ford and half-spun into the grass at Club corner, losing more than ten seconds to Tréluyer. Dumas was then forced wide onto the Woodcote corner run-off area by Rao and Rees overtook Franchitti for fifth in LMGTE Pro. After serving an earlier three-minute stop-and-go penalty for changing the car's engine Calado was running third in LMGTE Pro while Buemi drove the No. 5 Toyota back onto the circuit after his car was repaired. Tréluyer made a pit stop for fuel and tyres with Fässler taking over the No. 7 car. Fässler was followed by Lieb making a pit stop from the lead and handed his driving duties over to Jani. Fässler thus retook the lead with a nine-second advantage.

Fässler extended his lead to 13 seconds when Jani was delayed by a Porsche LMGTE car at Brooklands corner. Jani was able to reduce the time deficit to ten seconds before Fässler made a pit stop for new tyres by recording the fastest lap of the race in response, at 1:30.303. Jani made his pit stop for new tyres with over a minute lead with Fässler retaking the first position. After five minutes Jani's front-right tyre was punctured, necessitating an unscheduled pit stop to change the wheel, and for extra fuel. Fässler made his final scheduled pit stop for fuel to reach the end of the race and remained in the lead with a seven-second lead over Jani. Bachler suffered a front-right suspension issue on his car. Smoke bellowed out of the back of Richie Stanaway's Aston Martin heading into Copse corner and the car retired. Joël Camathias took over the LMGTE Am lead but slowed with a car problem and returned slowly to the pit lane, allowing the No. 83 AF Corse into first place. Pantanici lost sixth place in LMP2 to Merhi at the loop and Rast moved into third in category at Copse corner. The final stops began when Bruni made a stop, followed by Filipe Albuquerque who gained the LMP2 lead from co-driver Senna earlier on. Both Jani and Kobayashi stopped for fuel, enabling the pair to reach the end of the race.

Nicolas Lapierre sustained a puncture on his car in the final lap, allowing Strakka Racing to inherit fourth place. Unhindered in the final 35 minutes Fässler was the first driver to finish the race, 47 seconds ahead of Jani in second place, and Kobayashi followed in third position in the No. 6 Toyota. Albuquerque maintained his advantage to take the victory in LMP2, earning him and Senna their first World Endurance Championship class victories and González's fourth. They were followed by the No. 31 Extreme Speed Motorspors Ligier of Ryan Dalziel, Derani and Cumming 32 seconds later, with Rusinov, Nathanaël Berthon and Rast's No. 26 G-Drive Racing Oreca completing the class podium with all three cars on the same lap as each other. The No. 71 AF Corse Ferrari of Bird and Rigon were unchallenged throughout the race and clinched their first victory of the season, in front of teammates Bruni and Calado, with Turner, Nicki Thiim and Marco Sørensen in the No. 95 Aston Martin rounding out the LMGTE Pro podium positions after the car had to make an additional pit stop. In LMGTE Am, François Perrodo, Emmanuel Collard and Agias led the final half hour to secure their team's first win of the year in the category with a one-lap advantage over Aston Martin's No. 95 entry of Paul Dalla Lana, Pedro Lamy and Mathias Lauda.

=== Post-race ===
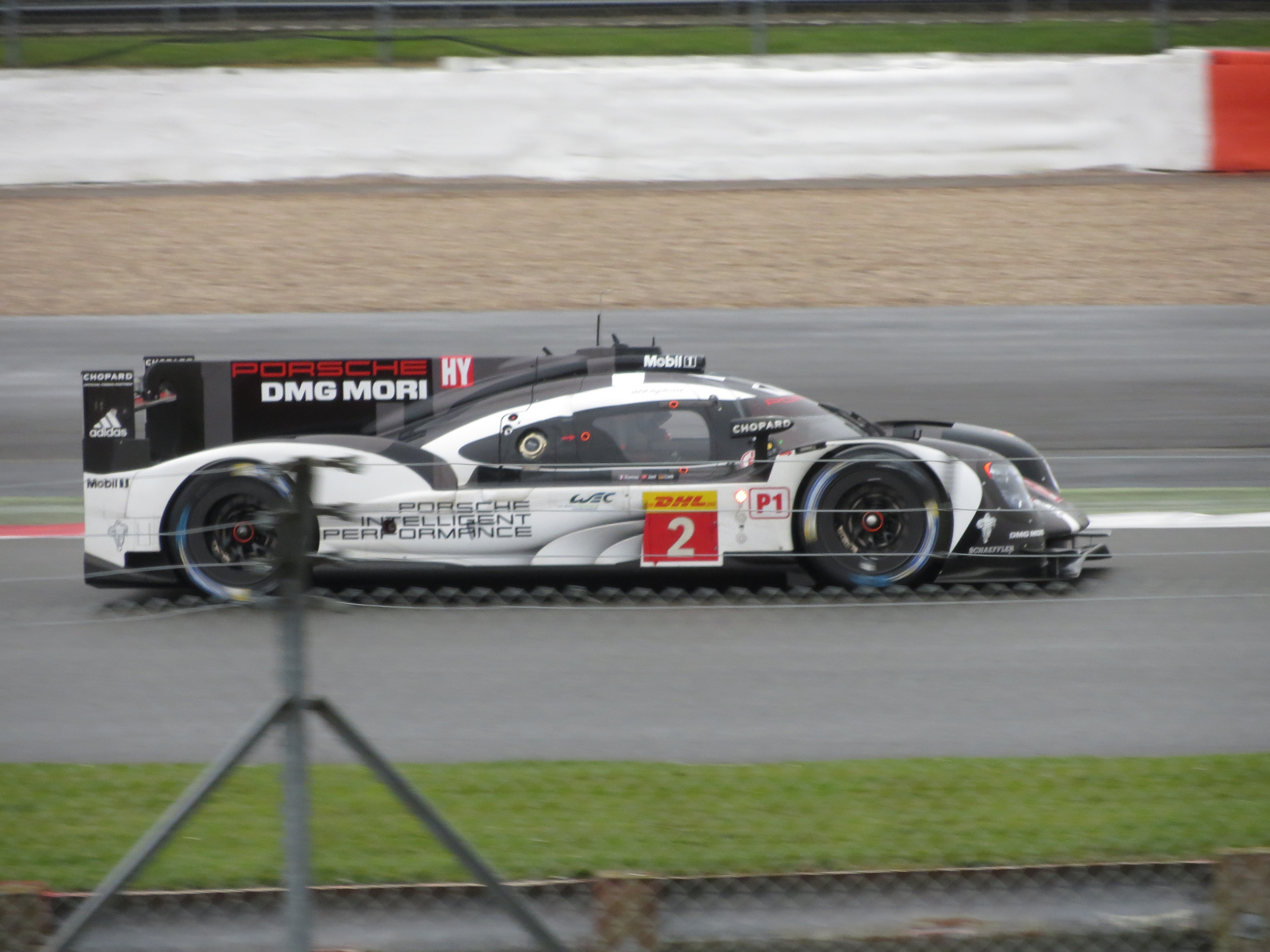
The race-winning No. 2 Porsche 919 Hybrid

The top three drivers of each racing class appeared on the podium to collect their trophies and in a later press conference. Lotterer was delighted over his team's performance, saying at this early stage of the season, Audi were "amazed" they were able to finish as the winners, but felt they were lucky because of Hartley's crash. Fässler said it had been "a riveting race" and the slower traffic made it more unpredictable. Tréluyer described the win as "the best way to open a season as you can imagine." Jani felt he would have had a possibility to challenge for the victory had he not been delayed by his late-race puncture. Dumas was satisfied with his early race battle with Jarvis and revealed that Porsche's target was to remain with their rivals. Sarrazin stated although his team still need improvements they were already closer than they had been the previous season and they were motivated to battle at the front of the field. Conway said the team's result was "a cool way to start the year" but had not been easy because Toyota still needed to work on their car's pace to get closer to their opposition. Kobayashi said his first race in LMP1 was "a positive start" and was excited about the No. 6 car's development.

Hartley was reprimanded by the stewards because he was deemed responsible for causing the crash between himself and Wainwright. He said that he felt "very upset for the team" but praised his car and Webber for his first (and only) stint. Hartley revealed that he did not feel pressure because of his large advantage upfront but did not apportion blame for the accident, calling it "a shocking moment and it is a true shame." Wainwright apportioned blame on Hartley for causing the incident, saying he was not aware the latter was near him until the crash occurred. He spoke of his feeling that Hartley was attempting to pass him and move across the track to rejoin onto the racing line for the next turn. His co-driver Carroll observed the incident and stated Hartley had not left enough space as was seen on television. He said it was "a very unfortunate accident and one that definitely could have been avoided. Definitely not our fault." All three of Audi's No. 8 car drivers were disappointed over their retirement from a hybrid system failure but Jarvis was optimistic for the next race. Toyota Motorsport GmbH technical director Pascal Vasselon described the manufacturer's race as an "average day". Bird remarked that Ferrari's LMGTE Pro victory "looked easy, but nothing is easy".

Shortly after the race, the No. 7 Audi was disqualified when scrutineers discovered that the front section of the car's skid block had been worn out by more than the permitted amount of 5 millimetres (0.20 in) per the regulations. The team offered an explanation to the stewards about the issue but it was rejected. Audi announced early on 18 April that they would appeal the decision, meaning the race result would remain provisional until the appeal was settled. Three days later, the team chose to drop their appeal following analysis of the problem that revealed the car was subjected to unexpected vertical movements. The head of Audi Sport, Wolfgang Ullrich, said the decision was made in the best interests of the championship and hoped the season's remaining races would be as "similarly thrilling as the season opener". The No. 7 Audi's disqualification meant Lieb, Jani and Dumas took their first victory of the season with Sarrazin, Conway and Kobayashi promoted to second, and Rebellion Racing's No. 13 car of Kraihamer, Alexandre Imperatori and Mathéo Tuscher inherited third, the team's first podium in the series since the 2013 6 Hours of Fuji.

As this was the first race of the season, Lieb, Jani and Dumas became the leaders of the Drivers' Championship with 25 points each, seven points ahead of their nearest rivals Sarrazin, Conway and Kobayashi, and a further three in front of Kraihamer, Imperatori and Tuscher. Heidfeld, Prost and Piquet were fourth on twelve points, with Senna, Albuquerque and González rounding out the top five with ten points. Toyota were leading the Manufacturers' Championship with 33 points, eight ahead of their rival Porsche in second; the third-placed manufacturer Audi had scored one point with eight races left in the season.

=== Race result ===
The minimum number of laps for classification (70 per cent of the overall winning car's race distance) was 136 laps. Class winners are denoted in bold.

Final race classification
Pos	Class	No	Team	Drivers	Chassis	Tyre	Laps	Time/Retired
Pos	Class	No	Team	Drivers	Engine	Tyre	Laps	Time/Retired
1	**LMP1**	**2**	**(Germany) Porsche Team**	**(Germany) Marc Lieb (France) Romain Dumas (Switzerland) Neel Jani**	**Porsche 919 Hybrid**	M	**194**	**06:01:53.028**
1	**LMP1**	**2**	**(Germany) Porsche Team**	**(Germany) Marc Lieb (France) Romain Dumas (Switzerland) Neel Jani**	**Porsche 2.0 L Turbo V4**	M	**194**	**06:01:53.028**
2	LMP1	6	(Japan) Toyota Gazoo Racing	(France) Stéphane Sarrazin (United Kingdom) Mike Conway (Japan) Kamui Kobayashi	Toyota TS050 Hybrid	M	193	+1 Lap
2	LMP1	6	(Japan) Toyota Gazoo Racing	(France) Stéphane Sarrazin (United Kingdom) Mike Conway (Japan) Kamui Kobayashi	Toyota 2.4 L Turbo V6	M	193	+1 Lap
3	LMP1	13	(Switzerland) Rebellion Racing	(Austria) Dominik Kraihamer (Switzerland) Alexandre Imperatori (Switzerland) Mathéo Tuscher	Rebellion R-One	D	183	+11 Laps
3	LMP1	13	(Switzerland) Rebellion Racing	(Austria) Dominik Kraihamer (Switzerland) Alexandre Imperatori (Switzerland) Mathéo Tuscher	AER P60 2.4 L Turbo V6	D	183	+11 Laps
4	LMP1	12	(Switzerland) Rebellion Racing	(France) Nico Prost (Germany) Nick Heidfeld (Brazil) Nelson Piquet Jr.	Rebellion R-One	D	181	+13 Laps
4	LMP1	12	(Switzerland) Rebellion Racing	(France) Nico Prost (Germany) Nick Heidfeld (Brazil) Nelson Piquet Jr.	AER P60 2.4 L Turbo V6	D	181	+13 Laps
5	**LMP2**	**43**	**(Mexico) RGR Sport by Morand**	**(Mexico) Ricardo González (Portugal) Filipe Albuquerque (Brazil) Bruno Senna**	**Ligier JS P2**	D	**179**	**+15 Laps**
5	**LMP2**	**43**	**(Mexico) RGR Sport by Morand**	**(Mexico) Ricardo González (Portugal) Filipe Albuquerque (Brazil) Bruno Senna**	**Nissan VK45DE 4.5 L V8**	D	**179**	**+15 Laps**
6	LMP2	31	(United States) Extreme Speed Motorsports	(United Kingdom) Ryan Dalziel (Canada) Chris Cumming (Brazil) Pipo Derani	Ligier JS P2	D	179	+15 Laps
6	LMP2	31	(United States) Extreme Speed Motorsports	(United Kingdom) Ryan Dalziel (Canada) Chris Cumming (Brazil) Pipo Derani	Nissan VK45DE 4.5 L V8	D	179	+15 Laps
7	LMP2	26	(Russia) G-Drive Racing	(Russia) Roman Rusinov (France) Nathanaël Berthon (Germany) René Rast	Oreca 05	D	179	+15 Laps
7	LMP2	26	(Russia) G-Drive Racing	(Russia) Roman Rusinov (France) Nathanaël Berthon (Germany) René Rast	Nissan VK45DE 4.5 L V8	D	179	+15 Laps
8	LMP2	36	(France) Signatech Alpine	(France) Nicolas Lapierre (United States) Gustavo Menezes (Monaco) Stéphane Richelmi	Alpine A460	D	178	+16 Laps
8	LMP2	36	(France) Signatech Alpine	(France) Nicolas Lapierre (United States) Gustavo Menezes (Monaco) Stéphane Richelmi	Nissan VK45DE 4.5 L V8	D	178	+16 Laps
9	LMP2	42	(United Kingdom) Strakka Racing	(United Kingdom) Nick Leventis (United Kingdom) Jonny Kane (United Kingdom) Danny Watts	Gibson 015S	D	177	+17 Laps
9	LMP2	42	(United Kingdom) Strakka Racing	(United Kingdom) Nick Leventis (United Kingdom) Jonny Kane (United Kingdom) Danny Watts	Nissan VK45DE 4.5 L V8	D	177	+17 Laps
10	LMP2	45	(United Kingdom) Manor	(United Kingdom) Matt Rao (United Kingdom) Richard Bradley (Spain) Roberto Merhi	Oreca 05	D	177	+17 Laps
10	LMP2	45	(United Kingdom) Manor	(United Kingdom) Matt Rao (United Kingdom) Richard Bradley (Spain) Roberto Merhi	Nissan VK45DE 4.5 L V8	D	177	+17 Laps
11	LMP2	35	(China) Baxi DC Racing Alpine	(United States) David Cheng (China) Ho-Pin Tung (France) Nelson Panciatici	Alpine A460	D	176	+18 Laps
11	LMP2	35	(China) Baxi DC Racing Alpine	(United States) David Cheng (China) Ho-Pin Tung (France) Nelson Panciatici	Nissan VK45DE 4.5 L V8	D	176	+18 Laps
12	LMP2	37	(Russia) SMP Racing	(Russia) Vitaly Petrov (Russia) Viktor Shaytar (Russia) Kirill Ladygin	BR Engineering BR01	D	176	+18 Laps
12	LMP2	37	(Russia) SMP Racing	(Russia) Vitaly Petrov (Russia) Viktor Shaytar (Russia) Kirill Ladygin	Nissan VK45DE 4.5 L V8	D	176	+18 Laps
13	LMP2	30	(United States) Extreme Speed Motorsports	(United States) Scott Sharp (United States) Ed Brown (United States) Johannes van Overbeek	Ligier JS P2	D	175	+19 Laps
13	LMP2	30	(United States) Extreme Speed Motorsports	(United States) Scott Sharp (United States) Ed Brown (United States) Johannes van Overbeek	Nissan VK45DE 4.5 L V8	D	175	+19 Laps
14	LMP1	4	(Austria) ByKolles Racing Team	(Switzerland) Simon Trummer (United Kingdom) James Rossiter (United Kingdom) Oliver Webb	CLM P1/01	D	172	+22 Laps
14	LMP1	4	(Austria) ByKolles Racing Team	(Switzerland) Simon Trummer (United Kingdom) James Rossiter (United Kingdom) Oliver Webb	AER P60 2.4 L Turbo V6	D	172	+22 Laps
15	LMP2	27	(Russia) SMP Racing	(France) Nicolas Minassian (Italy) Maurizio Mediani	BR Engineering BR01	D	171	+23 Laps
15	LMP2	27	(Russia) SMP Racing	(France) Nicolas Minassian (Italy) Maurizio Mediani	Nissan VK45DE 4.5 L V8	D	171	+23 Laps
16	LMP1	5	(Japan) Toyota Gazoo Racing	(United Kingdom) Anthony Davidson (Switzerland) Sébastien Buemi (Japan) Kazuki Nakajima	Toyota TS050 Hybrid	M	170	+24 Laps
16	LMP1	5	(Japan) Toyota Gazoo Racing	(United Kingdom) Anthony Davidson (Switzerland) Sébastien Buemi (Japan) Kazuki Nakajima	Toyota 2.4 L Turbo V6	M	170	+24 Laps
17	**LMGTE; Pro**	**71**	**(Italy) AF Corse**	**(Italy) Davide Rigon (United Kingdom) Sam Bird**	**Ferrari 488 GTE**	M	**167**	**+27 Laps**
17	**LMGTE; Pro**	**71**	**(Italy) AF Corse**	**(Italy) Davide Rigon (United Kingdom) Sam Bird**	**Ferrari F154CB 3.9 L Turbo V8**	M	**167**	**+27 Laps**
18	LMGTE; Pro	51	(Italy) AF Corse	(Italy) Gianmaria Bruni (United Kingdom) James Calado	Ferrari 488 GTE	M	166	+28 Laps
18	LMGTE; Pro	51	(Italy) AF Corse	(Italy) Gianmaria Bruni (United Kingdom) James Calado	Ferrari F154CB 3.9 L Turbo V8	M	166	+28 Laps
19	LMGTE; Pro	95	(United Kingdom) Aston Martin Racing	(Denmark) Nicki Thiim (Denmark) Marco Sørensen (United Kingdom) Darren Turner	Aston Martin V8 Vantage GTE	D	166	+28 Laps
19	LMGTE; Pro	95	(United Kingdom) Aston Martin Racing	(Denmark) Nicki Thiim (Denmark) Marco Sørensen (United Kingdom) Darren Turner	Aston Martin 4.5 L V8	D	166	+28 Laps
20	LMGTE; Pro	67	(United States) Ford Chip Ganassi Team UK	(United Kingdom) Andy Priaulx (United Kingdom) Marino Franchitti (United Kingdom) Harry Tincknell	Ford GT	M	165	+29 Laps
20	LMGTE; Pro	67	(United States) Ford Chip Ganassi Team UK	(United Kingdom) Andy Priaulx (United Kingdom) Marino Franchitti (United Kingdom) Harry Tincknell	Ford EcoBoost 3.5 L Turbo V6	M	165	+29 Laps
21	LMGTE; Pro	66	(United States) Ford Chip Ganassi Team UK	(France) Olivier Pla (Germany) Stefan Mücke (United States) Billy Johnson	Ford GT	M	165	+29 Laps
21	LMGTE; Pro	66	(United States) Ford Chip Ganassi Team UK	(France) Olivier Pla (Germany) Stefan Mücke (United States) Billy Johnson	Ford EcoBoost 3.5 L Turbo V6	M	165	+29 Laps
22	**LMGTE; Am**	**83**	**(Italy) AF Corse**	**(France) François Perrodo (France) Emmanuel Collard (Portugal) Rui Águas**	**Ferrari 458 Italia GT2**	M	**163**	**+31 Laps**
22	**LMGTE; Am**	**83**	**(Italy) AF Corse**	**(France) François Perrodo (France) Emmanuel Collard (Portugal) Rui Águas**	**Ferrari 4.5 L V8**	M	**163**	**+31 Laps**
23	LMGTE; Am	98	(United Kingdom) Aston Martin Racing	(Canada) Paul Dalla Lana (Portugal) Pedro Lamy (Austria) Mathias Lauda	Aston Martin V8 Vantage GTE	D	162	+32 Laps
23	LMGTE; Am	98	(United Kingdom) Aston Martin Racing	(Canada) Paul Dalla Lana (Portugal) Pedro Lamy (Austria) Mathias Lauda	Aston Martin 4.5 L V8	D	162	+32 Laps
24	LMGTE; Am	50	(France) Larbre Compétition	(Japan) Yutaka Yamagishi (Italy) Paolo Ruberti (France) Pierre Ragues	Chevrolet Corvette C7.R	M	161	+33 Laps
24	LMGTE; Am	50	(France) Larbre Compétition	(Japan) Yutaka Yamagishi (Italy) Paolo Ruberti (France) Pierre Ragues	Chevrolet LT5.5 5.5 L V8	M	161	+33 Laps
25	LMGTE; Pro	77	(Germany) Dempsey-Proton Racing	(Austria) Richard Lietz (Denmark) Michael Christensen	Porsche 911 RSR	M	154	+40 Laps
25	LMGTE; Pro	77	(Germany) Dempsey-Proton Racing	(Austria) Richard Lietz (Denmark) Michael Christensen	Porsche 4.0 L Flat-6	M	154	+40 Laps
26	LMGTE; Am	78	(Hong Kong) KCMG	(Germany) Christian Ried (Germany) Wolf Henzler (Switzerland) Joël Camathias	Porsche 911 RSR	M	154	+40 Laps
26	LMGTE; Am	78	(Hong Kong) KCMG	(Germany) Christian Ried (Germany) Wolf Henzler (Switzerland) Joël Camathias	Porsche 4.0 L Flat-6	M	154	+40 Laps
27	LMGTE; Am	88	(United Arab Emirates) Abu Dhabi-Proton Racing	(United Arab Emirates) Khaled Al Qubaisi (Austria) Klaus Bachler (Denmark) David Heinemeier Hansson	Porsche 911 RSR	M	153	+41 Laps
27	LMGTE; Am	88	(United Arab Emirates) Abu Dhabi-Proton Racing	(United Arab Emirates) Khaled Al Qubaisi (Austria) Klaus Bachler (Denmark) David Heinemeier Hansson	Porsche 4.0 L Flat-6	M	153	+41 Laps
DNF	LMGTE; Pro	97	(United Kingdom) Aston Martin Racing	(Brazil) Fernando Rees (New Zealand) Richie Stanaway	Aston Martin V8 Vantage GTE	D	151	Engine
DNF	LMGTE; Pro	97	(United Kingdom) Aston Martin Racing	(Brazil) Fernando Rees (New Zealand) Richie Stanaway	Aston Martin 4.5 L V8	D	151	Engine
DNF	LMP2	44	(United Kingdom) Manor	(Thailand) Tor Graves (United Kingdom) James Jakes (United Kingdom) Will Stevens	Oreca 05	D	129	Powertrain
DNF	LMP2	44	(United Kingdom) Manor	(Thailand) Tor Graves (United Kingdom) James Jakes (United Kingdom) Will Stevens	Nissan VK45DE 4.5 L V8	D	129	Powertrain
DNF	LMP1	1	(Germany) Porsche Team	(Germany) Timo Bernhard (New Zealand) Brendon Hartley (Australia) Mark Webber	Porsche 919 Hybrid	M	70	Accident
DNF	LMP1	1	(Germany) Porsche Team	(Germany) Timo Bernhard (New Zealand) Brendon Hartley (Australia) Mark Webber	Porsche 2.0 L Turbo V4	M	70	Accident
DNF	LMP1	8	(Germany) Audi Sport Team Joest	(France) Loïc Duval (Brazil) Lucas di Grassi (United Kingdom) Oliver Jarvis	Audi R18 e-tron quattro	M	69	Electrical
DNF	LMP1	8	(Germany) Audi Sport Team Joest	(France) Loïc Duval (Brazil) Lucas di Grassi (United Kingdom) Oliver Jarvis	Audi TDI 4.0 L Turbo Diesel V6	M	69	Electrical
DNF	LMGTE; Am	86	(United Kingdom) Gulf Racing	(United Kingdom) Michael Wainwright (United Kingdom) Adam Carroll (United Kingdom) Ben Barker	Porsche 911 RSR	M	56	Accident
DNF	LMGTE; Am	86	(United Kingdom) Gulf Racing	(United Kingdom) Michael Wainwright (United Kingdom) Adam Carroll (United Kingdom) Ben Barker	Porsche 4.0 L Flat-6	M	56	Accident
EX (Note: The No. 7 Audi was excluded from the race for a technical infraction in post-race inspection. The car's skid plank was worn beyond the limits allowed by the regulations.)	LMP1	7	(Germany) Audi Sport Team Joest	(Germany) André Lotterer (Switzerland) Marcel Fässler (France) Benoît Tréluyer	Audi R18 e-tron quattro	M	194	Disqualified
EX	LMP1	7	(Germany) Audi Sport Team Joest	(Germany) André Lotterer (Switzerland) Marcel Fässler (France) Benoît Tréluyer	Audi TDI 4.0 L Turbo Diesel V6	M	194	Disqualified

Tyre manufacturers
Key
Symbol	Tyre manufacturer
**D**	Dunlop
**M**	Michelin

== Standings after the race ==
World Endurance Drivers' Championship standings
Pos.	+/–	Driver	Points
1		(Germany) Marc Lieb (France) Romain Dumas (Switzerland) Neel Jani	25
2		(Japan) Kamui Kobayashi (United Kingdom) Mike Conway (France) Stéphane Sarrazin	18
3		(Austria) Dominik Kraihamer (Switzerland) Alexandre Imperatori (Switzerland) Mathéo Tuscher	15
4		(France) Nico Prost (Germany) Nick Heidfeld (Brazil) Nelson Piquet Jr.	12
5		(Brazil) Bruno Senna (Portugal) Filipe Albuquerque (Mexico) Ricardo González	10

World Endurance Manufacturers' Championship standings
Pos.	+/–	Constructor	Points
1		(Japan) Toyota	33
2		(Germany) Porsche	25
3		(Germany) Audi	1

- Note: Only the top five positions are included for the Drivers' Championship standings.

== Notes ==
FIA World Endurance Championship
Previous race: None	2016 season	Next race: 6 Hours of Spa-Francorchamps
