= Vasilije Calasan =

Vasilije Calasan (born December 23, 1981, in Zagreb, Croatia) is a former French racing driver.

Calasan started racing in 1997, when he began karting. After three seasons of karting, he stepped up to single seater racing in 2000 in the BRDC Formula Ford championship, in which he finished second with multiple wins.

2002–03 saw a step up to the British Formula Renault Championship which is widely regarded as one of the world's foremost junior single-seater categories.

Calasan ascended another tier in 2004, stepping up to the British Formula Three Championship (national class), with Promatecme Racing. British Formula 3 has long been the traditional training ground for the stars of the future. Calasan took his first win in the series the same year in the first race at Silverstone. He finished third in the championship with many podiums and three wins.
