= 2012 FIA World Endurance Championship =

Auto racing series

- Organizer: Fédération Internationale de l'Automobile; Automobile Club de l'Ouest
- Discipline: Sports car endurance racing
- Races: 8

Champions
- LMP1 Manufacturer: (Germany) Audi
- GTE Manufacturer: (Italy) Ferrari
- LMP1 Team: (Switzerland) Rebellion Racing
- LMP2 Team: (United States) Starworks Motorsport
- LMGTE Pro Team: (Italy) AF Corse
- LMGTE Am Team: (France) Larbre Compétition

FIA World Endurance Championship
- ← 2011 (ILMC) 2013 →

The 2012 FIA World Endurance Championship was the inaugural running of the World Endurance Championship. It was co-organised by the Fédération Internationale de l'Automobile (FIA) and the Automobile Club de l'Ouest (ACO). The series replaced the former Intercontinental Le Mans Cup held by the ACO from 2010 to 2011. The series was open to Le Mans Prototypes and grand tourer-based racing cars meeting four ACO categories. Several championships, cups, and trophies were awarded in the series' four categories following an eight race season, with a World Championship available to the top scoring drivers and LMP1 category manufacturer.

Following a partial-season match-up against newcomers Toyota, Audi won the Manufacturers' World Championship, while the company's driver line-up of André Lotterer of Germany, Benoît Tréluyer of France, and Marcel Fässler of Switzerland earned the Drivers' World Championship ahead of their teammates Allan McNish and Tom Kristensen. Toyota's Alexander Wurz and Nicolas Lapierre were third in the Drivers' Championship standings. Ferrari defending their two Intercontinental Le Mans Cup LMGTE manufacturers title with the Manufacturers' World Cup, outscoring Porsche and Corvette. In the four FIA Trophies for the four categories in the championship, Rebellion Racing won the LMP1 Privateers title, while Starworks Motorsport secured the LMP2 championship; AF Corse won the LMGTE Pro category for the second season in a row, as did Larbre Compétition in LMGTE Am.

== Calendar ==
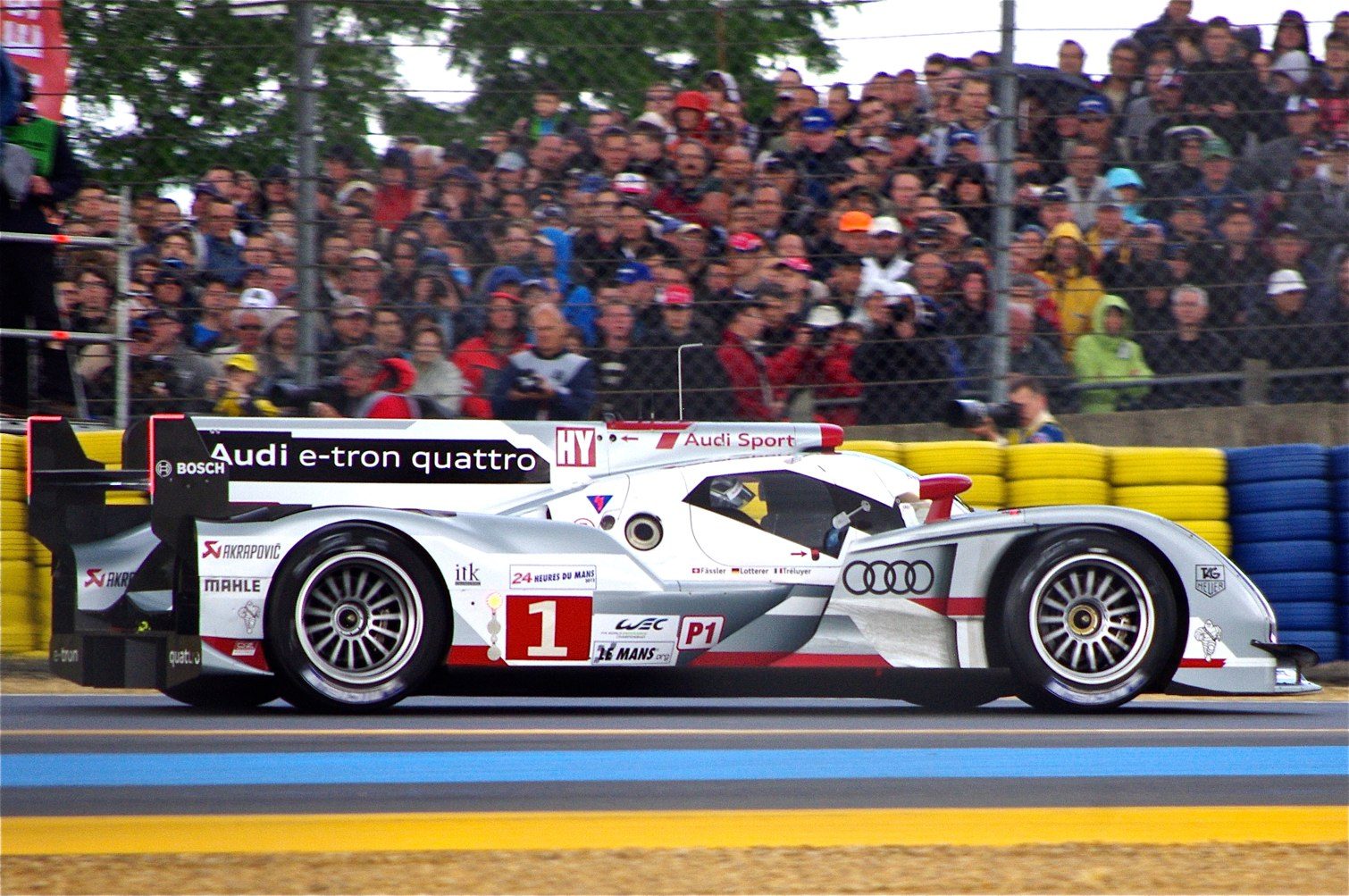
Audi won five of the eight championship races with their R18s

An initial calendar was announced on 12 November 2011, featuring eight races in eight countries on four continents. Sebring, Spa-Francorchamps, Le Mans, and Silverstone are retained from the 2011 Intercontinental Le Mans Cup, while the Chinese round remained undecided between 2011's Zhuhai International Circuit or the Shanghai International Circuit. Three new races at the Autódromo José Carlos Pace, Bahrain International Circuit, and Fuji Speedway expand the series to a new continent, replacing the former ILMC round for the Petit Le Mans. A revised calendar released on 7 December swapped the dates of the events in Bahrain and Fuji, while ACO confirmed on 2 February that the final round would be hosted in Shanghai, with the date moved to 27 October. All races were timed events. The 12 Hours of Sebring was a joint event with competitors from the American Le Mans Series sharing half of the race grid, but not scoring points in the World Championship.

Rnd	Race	Circuit	Location	Date
1	12 Hours of Sebring	Sebring International Raceway	(United States) Sebring, Florida	17 March
2	6 Heures de Spa-Francorchamps	Circuit de Spa-Francorchamps	(Belgium) Stavelot	5 May
3	24 Heures du Mans	Circuit de la Sarthe	(France) Le Mans	16–17 June
4	6 Hours of Silverstone	Silverstone Circuit	(United Kingdom) Silverstone	26 August
5	6 Hours of São Paulo	Autódromo José Carlos Pace	(Brazil) São Paulo	15 September
6	6 Hours of Bahrain	Bahrain International Circuit	(Bahrain) Sakhir	29 September
7	6 Hours of Fuji	Fuji Speedway	(Japan) Oyama, Shizuoka	14 October
8	6 Hours of Shanghai	Shanghai International Circuit	(China) Shanghai	28 October

== Entries ==
The World Endurance Championship received entries in four classes, including Le Mans Prototype 1 (LMP1), Le Mans Prototype 2 (LMP2), Le Mans Grand Touring Endurance — Professional (LMGTE Pro) and Le Mans Grand Touring Endurance — Amateur (LMGTE Am). The entry list for the 2012 season was released by the Automobile Club de l'Ouest on 2 February, and included nine LMP1 and LMP2 cars, five LMGTE Pro entries, and seven LMGTE Am cars, bringing the full grid up to thirty entrants. Additional entries from full-season teams were also allowed over the course of the season, with a maximum of three cars per entrant.

=== LMP1 ===
Entrant/Team	Car	Engine	Tyre	No.	Drivers	Rounds
(Germany) Audi Sport Team Joest	Audi R18 TDI; Audi R18 ultra Audi R18 e-tron quattro	Audi TDI 3.7 L Turbo V6 (Diesel); Audi TDI 3.7 L Turbo V6 (Diesel); Audi TDI 3.7 L Turbo V6 (Hybrid Diesel)	M	1	(Germany) André Lotterer	All
(Germany) Audi Sport Team Joest	Audi R18 TDI; Audi R18 ultra Audi R18 e-tron quattro	Audi TDI 3.7 L Turbo V6 (Diesel); Audi TDI 3.7 L Turbo V6 (Diesel); Audi TDI 3.7 L Turbo V6 (Hybrid Diesel)	M	1	(France) Benoît Tréluyer	All
(Germany) Audi Sport Team Joest	Audi R18 TDI; Audi R18 ultra Audi R18 e-tron quattro	Audi TDI 3.7 L Turbo V6 (Diesel); Audi TDI 3.7 L Turbo V6 (Diesel); Audi TDI 3.7 L Turbo V6 (Hybrid Diesel)	M	1	(Switzerland) Marcel Fässler	All
(Germany) Audi Sport Team Joest	Audi R18 TDI; Audi R18 ultra Audi R18 e-tron quattro	Audi TDI 3.7 L Turbo V6 (Diesel); Audi TDI 3.7 L Turbo V6 (Diesel); Audi TDI 3.7 L Turbo V6 (Hybrid Diesel)	M	2	(United Kingdom) Allan McNish	All
(Germany) Audi Sport Team Joest	Audi R18 TDI; Audi R18 ultra Audi R18 e-tron quattro	Audi TDI 3.7 L Turbo V6 (Diesel); Audi TDI 3.7 L Turbo V6 (Diesel); Audi TDI 3.7 L Turbo V6 (Hybrid Diesel)	M	2	(Denmark) Tom Kristensen	All
(Germany) Audi Sport Team Joest	Audi R18 TDI; Audi R18 ultra Audi R18 e-tron quattro	Audi TDI 3.7 L Turbo V6 (Diesel); Audi TDI 3.7 L Turbo V6 (Diesel); Audi TDI 3.7 L Turbo V6 (Hybrid Diesel)	M	2	(Italy) Dindo Capello	1–3
(Germany) Audi Sport Team Joest	Audi R18 TDI; Audi R18 ultra Audi R18 e-tron quattro	Audi TDI 3.7 L Turbo V6 (Diesel); Audi TDI 3.7 L Turbo V6 (Diesel); Audi TDI 3.7 L Turbo V6 (Hybrid Diesel)	M	2	(Brazil) Lucas di Grassi	5
(Germany) Audi Sport Team Joest	Audi R18 TDI; Audi R18 ultra Audi R18 e-tron quattro	Audi TDI 3.7 L Turbo V6 (Diesel); Audi TDI 3.7 L Turbo V6 (Diesel); Audi TDI 3.7 L Turbo V6 (Hybrid Diesel)	M	3	(Germany) Timo Bernhard	1
(Germany) Audi Sport Team Joest	Audi R18 TDI; Audi R18 ultra Audi R18 e-tron quattro	Audi TDI 3.7 L Turbo V6 (Diesel); Audi TDI 3.7 L Turbo V6 (Diesel); Audi TDI 3.7 L Turbo V6 (Hybrid Diesel)	M	3	(Spain) Marc Gené	2–3
(Germany) Audi Sport Team Joest	Audi R18 TDI; Audi R18 ultra Audi R18 e-tron quattro	Audi TDI 3.7 L Turbo V6 (Diesel); Audi TDI 3.7 L Turbo V6 (Diesel); Audi TDI 3.7 L Turbo V6 (Hybrid Diesel)	M	3	(France) Romain Dumas	1–3
(Germany) Audi Sport Team Joest	Audi R18 TDI; Audi R18 ultra Audi R18 e-tron quattro	Audi TDI 3.7 L Turbo V6 (Diesel); Audi TDI 3.7 L Turbo V6 (Diesel); Audi TDI 3.7 L Turbo V6 (Hybrid Diesel)	M	3	(France) Loïc Duval	1–3
(Japan) Toyota Racing	Toyota TS030 Hybrid	Toyota RV8KLM 3.4 L V8 (Hybrid)	M	7	(France) Nicolas Lapierre	3–8
(Japan) Toyota Racing	Toyota TS030 Hybrid	Toyota RV8KLM 3.4 L V8 (Hybrid)	M	7	(Austria) Alexander Wurz	3–8
(Japan) Toyota Racing	Toyota TS030 Hybrid	Toyota RV8KLM 3.4 L V8 (Hybrid)	M	7	(Japan) Kazuki Nakajima	3–4, 7
(Japan) Toyota Racing	Toyota TS030 Hybrid	Toyota RV8KLM 3.4 L V8 (Hybrid)	M	8	(United Kingdom) Anthony Davidson	3
(Japan) Toyota Racing	Toyota TS030 Hybrid	Toyota RV8KLM 3.4 L V8 (Hybrid)	M	8	(Switzerland) Sébastien Buemi	3
(Japan) Toyota Racing	Toyota TS030 Hybrid	Toyota RV8KLM 3.4 L V8 (Hybrid)	M	8	(France) Stéphane Sarrazin	3
(Switzerland) Rebellion Racing	Lola B11/60; Lola B12/60	Toyota RV8KLM 3.4 L V8; Toyota RV8KLM 3.4 L V8	M	12	(Switzerland) Neel Jani	All
(Switzerland) Rebellion Racing	Lola B11/60; Lola B12/60	Toyota RV8KLM 3.4 L V8; Toyota RV8KLM 3.4 L V8	M	12	(France) Nicolas Prost	All
(Switzerland) Rebellion Racing	Lola B11/60; Lola B12/60	Toyota RV8KLM 3.4 L V8; Toyota RV8KLM 3.4 L V8	M	12	(Germany) Nick Heidfeld	1–3
(Switzerland) Rebellion Racing	Lola B11/60; Lola B12/60	Toyota RV8KLM 3.4 L V8; Toyota RV8KLM 3.4 L V8	M	13	(Italy) Andrea Belicchi	All
(Switzerland) Rebellion Racing	Lola B11/60; Lola B12/60	Toyota RV8KLM 3.4 L V8; Toyota RV8KLM 3.4 L V8	M	13	(Switzerland) Harold Primat	All
(Switzerland) Rebellion Racing	Lola B11/60; Lola B12/60	Toyota RV8KLM 3.4 L V8; Toyota RV8KLM 3.4 L V8	M	13	(Netherlands) Jeroen Bleekemolen	1, 3
(Switzerland) Rebellion Racing	Lola B11/60; Lola B12/60	Toyota RV8KLM 3.4 L V8; Toyota RV8KLM 3.4 L V8	M	13	(China) Congfu Cheng	8
(France) OAK Racing	OAK Pescarolo 01	Judd DB 3.4 L V8; Honda LM-V8 3.4 L V8	D	15	(Austria) Dominik Kraihamer	1–3, 7–8
(France) OAK Racing	OAK Pescarolo 01	Judd DB 3.4 L V8; Honda LM-V8 3.4 L V8	D	15	(Belgium) Bertrand Baguette	1–3, 7–8
(France) OAK Racing	OAK Pescarolo 01	Judd DB 3.4 L V8; Honda LM-V8 3.4 L V8	D	15	(France) Guillaume Moreau	1–2
(France) OAK Racing	OAK Pescarolo 01	Judd DB 3.4 L V8; Honda LM-V8 3.4 L V8	D	15	(France) Franck Montagny	3
(France) OAK Racing	OAK Pescarolo 01	Judd DB 3.4 L V8; Honda LM-V8 3.4 L V8	D	15	(Japan) Takuma Sato	7–8
(France) Pescarolo Team	Pescarolo 01; Pescarolo 03	Judd GV5 S2 5.0 L V10; Judd DB 3.4 L V8	M	16	(France) Jean-Christophe Boullion	1, 3
(France) Pescarolo Team	Pescarolo 01; Pescarolo 03	Judd GV5 S2 5.0 L V10; Judd DB 3.4 L V8	M	16	(France) Emmanuel Collard	1, 3
(France) Pescarolo Team	Pescarolo 01; Pescarolo 03	Judd GV5 S2 5.0 L V10; Judd DB 3.4 L V8	M	16	(France) Julien Jousse	1
(France) Pescarolo Team	Pescarolo 01; Pescarolo 03	Judd GV5 S2 5.0 L V10; Judd DB 3.4 L V8	M	16	(United Kingdom) Stuart Hall	3
(France) Pescarolo Team	Dome S102.5	Judd DB 3.4 L V8	M	17	(France) Sébastien Bourdais	2–3
(France) Pescarolo Team	Dome S102.5	Judd DB 3.4 L V8	M	17	(France) Nicolas Minassian	2–3
(France) Pescarolo Team	Dome S102.5	Judd DB 3.4 L V8	M	17	(Japan) Seiji Ara	3
(United Kingdom) Strakka Racing	HPD ARX-03a	Honda LM-V8 3.4 L V8	M	21	(United Kingdom) Jonny Kane	All
(United Kingdom) Strakka Racing	HPD ARX-03a	Honda LM-V8 3.4 L V8	M	21	(United Kingdom) Nick Leventis	All
(United Kingdom) Strakka Racing	HPD ARX-03a	Honda LM-V8 3.4 L V8	M	21	(United Kingdom) Danny Watts	All
(United Kingdom) JRM	HPD ARX-03a	Honda LM-V8 3.4 L V8	M	22	(Australia) David Brabham	All
(United Kingdom) JRM	HPD ARX-03a	Honda LM-V8 3.4 L V8	M	22	(India) Karun Chandhok	All
(United Kingdom) JRM	HPD ARX-03a	Honda LM-V8 3.4 L V8	M	22	(United Kingdom) Peter Dumbreck	All

Key
Full-season entry
* Eligible for all championship points
Additional entry
* Eligible only for Drivers' championship points
Third manufacturer entry
* Eligible for Drivers' championship points
* Only eligible for LMP1 Manufacturers' championship points at Le Mans

- Peugeot Sport abruptly withdrew from the season on 18 January 2012, having initially unveiled a new car, the Peugeot 908 Hybrid4. Sébastien Bourdais, Anthony Davidson, Franck Montagny and Stéphane Sarrazin all had ongoing contracts with Peugeot at the time of its withdrawal, as did Lucas di Grassi, Marino Franchitti, Marc Gené, Simon Pagenaud, Olivier Pla and Jean-Karl Vernay.
- Hiroaki Ishiura was scheduled to compete for Toyota Racing at the 24 Hours of Le Mans, but was later replaced by Stéphane Sarrazin.

=== LMP2 ===
Entrant/Team	Car	Engine	Tyre	No.	Drivers	Rounds
(France) Signatech-Nissan	Oreca 03	Nissan VK45DE 4.5 L V8	D	23	(France) Olivier Lombard	All
(France) Signatech-Nissan	Oreca 03	Nissan VK45DE 4.5 L V8	D	23	(France) Franck Mailleux	All
(France) Signatech-Nissan	Oreca 03	Nissan VK45DE 4.5 L V8	D	23	(France) Jordan Tresson	All
(France) Signatech-Nissan	Oreca 03	Nissan VK45DE 4.5 L V8	D	26	(France) Pierre Ragues	2–8
(France) Signatech-Nissan	Oreca 03	Nissan VK45DE 4.5 L V8	D	26	(France) Nelson Panciatici	2–8
(France) Signatech-Nissan	Oreca 03	Nissan VK45DE 4.5 L V8	D	26	(Russia) Roman Rusinov	2–8
(France) OAK Racing	Morgan LMP2	Judd HK 3.6 L V8; Nissan VK45DE 4.5 L V8	D	24	(France) Jacques Nicolet	All
(France) OAK Racing	Morgan LMP2	Judd HK 3.6 L V8; Nissan VK45DE 4.5 L V8	D	24	(France) Olivier Pla	All
(France) OAK Racing	Morgan LMP2	Judd HK 3.6 L V8; Nissan VK45DE 4.5 L V8	D	24	(France) Matthieu Lahaye	All
(France) OAK Racing	Morgan LMP2	Judd HK 3.6 L V8; Nissan VK45DE 4.5 L V8	D	35	(Denmark) David Heinemeier Hansson	2–4
(France) OAK Racing	Morgan LMP2	Judd HK 3.6 L V8; Nissan VK45DE 4.5 L V8	D	35	(Belgium) Bas Leinders	2–3
(France) OAK Racing	Morgan LMP2	Judd HK 3.6 L V8; Nissan VK45DE 4.5 L V8	D	35	(Belgium) Maxime Martin	3
(France) OAK Racing	Morgan LMP2	Judd HK 3.6 L V8; Nissan VK45DE 4.5 L V8	D	35	(Belgium) Bertrand Baguette	4–6
(France) OAK Racing	Morgan LMP2	Judd HK 3.6 L V8; Nissan VK45DE 4.5 L V8	D	35	(Austria) Dominik Kraihamer	4–6
(France) OAK Racing	Morgan LMP2	Judd HK 3.6 L V8; Nissan VK45DE 4.5 L V8	D	35	(United Kingdom) Alex Brundle	5–6
(United Kingdom) ADR-Delta	Oreca 03	Nissan VK45DE 4.5 L V8	D	25	(Thailand) Tor Graves	All
(United Kingdom) ADR-Delta	Oreca 03	Nissan VK45DE 4.5 L V8	D	25	(Australia) John Martin	All
(United Kingdom) ADR-Delta	Oreca 03	Nissan VK45DE 4.5 L V8	D	25	(United Kingdom) Robbie Kerr	1–2
(United Kingdom) ADR-Delta	Oreca 03	Nissan VK45DE 4.5 L V8	D	25	(Czech Republic) Jan Charouz	3–5
(United Kingdom) ADR-Delta	Oreca 03	Nissan VK45DE 4.5 L V8	D	25	(Japan) Shinji Nakano	7
(United Kingdom) ADR-Delta	Oreca 03	Nissan VK45DE 4.5 L V8	D	25	(Switzerland) Mathias Beche	8
(United Arab Emirates) Gulf Racing Middle East	Lola B12/80	Nissan VK45DE 4.5 L V8	D	28	(France) Fabien Giroix	1–3
(United Arab Emirates) Gulf Racing Middle East	Lola B12/80	Nissan VK45DE 4.5 L V8	D	28	(France) Maxime Jousse	1–2
(United Arab Emirates) Gulf Racing Middle East	Lola B12/80	Nissan VK45DE 4.5 L V8	D	28	(Sweden) Stefan Johansson	1–3
(United Arab Emirates) Gulf Racing Middle East	Lola B12/80	Nissan VK45DE 4.5 L V8	D	28	(France) Ludovic Badey	3
(United Arab Emirates) Gulf Racing Middle East	Lola B12/80	Nissan VK45DE 4.5 L V8	D	29	(Ivory Coast) Frédéric Fatien	1–2
(United Arab Emirates) Gulf Racing Middle East	Lola B12/80	Nissan VK45DE 4.5 L V8	D	29	(Japan) Keiko Ihara	All
(United Arab Emirates) Gulf Racing Middle East	Lola B12/80	Nissan VK45DE 4.5 L V8	D	29	(Switzerland) Jean-Denis Delétraz	All
(United Arab Emirates) Gulf Racing Middle East	Lola B12/80	Nissan VK45DE 4.5 L V8	D	29	(France) Marc Rostan	3
(United Arab Emirates) Gulf Racing Middle East	Lola B12/80	Nissan VK45DE 4.5 L V8	D	29	(France) Fabien Giroix	4–8
(Germany) Lotus	Lola B12/80	Lotus HK 3.6 L V8	D	31	(Germany) Thomas Holzer	All
(Germany) Lotus	Lola B12/80	Lotus HK 3.6 L V8	D	31	(Germany) Mirco Schultis	1–5, 7–8
(Germany) Lotus	Lola B12/80	Lotus HK 3.6 L V8	D	31	(Italy) Luca Moro	1, 3, 5–6
(Germany) Lotus	Lola B12/80	Lotus HK 3.6 L V8	D	31	(Netherlands) Renger van der Zande	2
(Germany) Lotus	Lola B12/80	Lotus HK 3.6 L V8	D	31	(Netherlands) Christijan Albers	4
(Germany) Lotus	Lola B12/80	Lotus HK 3.6 L V8	D	32	(Italy) Luca Moro	2
(Germany) Lotus	Lola B12/80	Lotus HK 3.6 L V8	D	32	(United States) Kevin Weeda	2, 4–8
(Germany) Lotus	Lola B12/80	Lotus HK 3.6 L V8	D	32	(United Kingdom) James Rossiter	2, 4–8
(Germany) Lotus	Lola B12/80	Lotus HK 3.6 L V8	D	32	(Italy) Vitantonio Liuzzi	4–7
(Germany) Lotus	Lola B12/80	Lotus HK 3.6 L V8	D	32	(Czech Republic) Jan Charouz	8
(United Kingdom) Greaves Motorsport	Zytek Z11SN	Nissan VK45DE 4.5 L V8	D	41	(United States) Elton Julian	All
(United Kingdom) Greaves Motorsport	Zytek Z11SN	Nissan VK45DE 4.5 L V8	D	41	(Germany) Christian Zugel	All
(United Kingdom) Greaves Motorsport	Zytek Z11SN	Nissan VK45DE 4.5 L V8	D	41	(Mexico) Ricardo González	1–4, 6–8
(United Kingdom) Greaves Motorsport	Zytek Z11SN	Nissan VK45DE 4.5 L V8	D	41	(Mexico) Roberto González	5
(United Kingdom) Greaves Motorsport	Zytek Z11SN	Nissan VK45DE 4.5 L V8	D	42	(United Kingdom) Alex Brundle	3–4
(United Kingdom) Greaves Motorsport	Zytek Z11SN	Nissan VK45DE 4.5 L V8	D	42	(United Kingdom) Martin Brundle	3–4
(United Kingdom) Greaves Motorsport	Zytek Z11SN	Nissan VK45DE 4.5 L V8	D	42	(Spain) Lucas Ordoñez	3–4
(United States) Starworks Motorsport	HPD ARX-03b	Honda HR28TT 2.8 L Turbo V6	D	44	(Venezuela) Enzo Potolicchio	All
(United States) Starworks Motorsport	HPD ARX-03b	Honda HR28TT 2.8 L Turbo V6	D	44	(United Kingdom) Ryan Dalziel	1–5, 7–8
(United States) Starworks Motorsport	HPD ARX-03b	Honda HR28TT 2.8 L Turbo V6	D	44	(France) Stéphane Sarrazin	1–2, 4–8
(United States) Starworks Motorsport	HPD ARX-03b	Honda HR28TT 2.8 L Turbo V6	D	44	(United Kingdom) Tom Kimber-Smith	3, 6
(Argentina) PeCom Racing	Oreca 03	Nissan VK45DE 4.5 L V8	D	49	(Germany) Pierre Kaffer	All
(Argentina) PeCom Racing	Oreca 03	Nissan VK45DE 4.5 L V8	D	49	(Argentina) Luis Pérez Companc	All
(Argentina) PeCom Racing	Oreca 03	Nissan VK45DE 4.5 L V8	D	49	(France) Soheil Ayari	1–4
(Argentina) PeCom Racing	Oreca 03	Nissan VK45DE 4.5 L V8	D	49	(France) Nicolas Minassian	5–8

=== LMGTE Pro ===
Entrant/Team	Car	Engine	Tyre	No.	Drivers	Rounds
(Italy) AF Corse	Ferrari 458 Italia GT2	Ferrari F136 4.5 L V8	M	51	(Italy) Gianmaria Bruni	1–5, 7–8
(Italy) AF Corse	Ferrari 458 Italia GT2	Ferrari F136 4.5 L V8	M	51	(Italy) Giancarlo Fisichella	All
(Italy) AF Corse	Ferrari 458 Italia GT2	Ferrari F136 4.5 L V8	M	51	(Finland) Toni Vilander	1, 3, 6
(Italy) AF Corse	Ferrari 458 Italia GT2	Ferrari F136 4.5 L V8	M	71	(Italy) Andrea Bertolini	All
(Italy) AF Corse	Ferrari 458 Italia GT2	Ferrari F136 4.5 L V8	M	71	(Monaco) Olivier Beretta	All
(Italy) AF Corse	Ferrari 458 Italia GT2	Ferrari F136 4.5 L V8	M	71	(Italy) Marco Cioci	1, 3
(France) Luxury Racing	Ferrari 458 Italia GT2	Ferrari F136 4.5 L V8	M	59	(France) Frédéric Makowiecki	1–3
(France) Luxury Racing	Ferrari 458 Italia GT2	Ferrari F136 4.5 L V8	M	59	(Brazil) Jaime Melo	1–3
(France) Luxury Racing	Ferrari 458 Italia GT2	Ferrari F136 4.5 L V8	M	59	(France) Jean-Karl Vernay	1
(France) Luxury Racing	Ferrari 458 Italia GT2	Ferrari F136 4.5 L V8	M	59	(Germany) Dominik Farnbacher	3
(Germany) Team Felbermayr-Proton	Porsche 997 GT3-RSR	Porsche M97/74 4.0 L Flat-6	M	77	(Germany) Marc Lieb	All
(Germany) Team Felbermayr-Proton	Porsche 997 GT3-RSR	Porsche M97/74 4.0 L Flat-6	M	77	(Austria) Richard Lietz	All
(Germany) Team Felbermayr-Proton	Porsche 997 GT3-RSR	Porsche M97/74 4.0 L Flat-6	M	77	(France) Patrick Pilet	1
(Germany) Team Felbermayr-Proton	Porsche 997 GT3-RSR	Porsche M97/74 4.0 L Flat-6	M	77	(Germany) Wolf Henzler	3
(United Kingdom) Aston Martin Racing	Aston Martin Vantage GTE	Aston Martin AM05 4.5 L V8	M	97	(Germany) Stefan Mücke	All
(United Kingdom) Aston Martin Racing	Aston Martin Vantage GTE	Aston Martin AM05 4.5 L V8	M	97	(United Kingdom) Darren Turner	All
(United Kingdom) Aston Martin Racing	Aston Martin Vantage GTE	Aston Martin AM05 4.5 L V8	M	97	(Mexico) Adrián Fernández	1–4

=== LMGTE Am ===
Entrant/Team	Car	Engine	Tyre	No.	Drivers	Rounds
(France) Larbre Compétition	Chevrolet Corvette C6.R	Chevrolet LS5.5R 5.5 L V8	M	50	(France) Patrick Bornhauser	All
(France) Larbre Compétition	Chevrolet Corvette C6.R	Chevrolet LS5.5R 5.5 L V8	M	50	(France) Julien Canal	All
(France) Larbre Compétition	Chevrolet Corvette C6.R	Chevrolet LS5.5R 5.5 L V8	M	50	(Portugal) Pedro Lamy	1, 3, 7–8
(France) Larbre Compétition	Chevrolet Corvette C6.R	Chevrolet LS5.5R 5.5 L V8	M	50	(Brazil) Fernando Rees	2, 4–6
(France) Larbre Compétition	Chevrolet Corvette C6.R	Chevrolet LS5.5R 5.5 L V8	M	70	(France) Jean-Philippe Belloc	All
(France) Larbre Compétition	Chevrolet Corvette C6.R	Chevrolet LS5.5R 5.5 L V8	M	70	(France) Christophe Bourret	All
(France) Larbre Compétition	Chevrolet Corvette C6.R	Chevrolet LS5.5R 5.5 L V8	M	70	(France) Pascal Gibon	1, 3–8
(United Kingdom) JWA-Avila	Porsche 997 GT3-RSR	Porsche M97/74 4.0 L Flat-6	P M	55	(Switzerland) Joël Camathias	All
(United Kingdom) JWA-Avila	Porsche 997 GT3-RSR	Porsche M97/74 4.0 L Flat-6	P M	55	(Finland) Markus Palttala	1–5
(United Kingdom) JWA-Avila	Porsche 997 GT3-RSR	Porsche M97/74 4.0 L Flat-6	P M	55	(United States) Bill Binnie	1
(United Kingdom) JWA-Avila	Porsche 997 GT3-RSR	Porsche M97/74 4.0 L Flat-6	P M	55	(United Kingdom) Paul Daniels	2–8
(United Kingdom) JWA-Avila	Porsche 997 GT3-RSR	Porsche M97/74 4.0 L Flat-6	P M	55	(Denmark) Benny Simonsen	6
(United Kingdom) JWA-Avila	Porsche 997 GT3-RSR	Porsche M97/74 4.0 L Flat-6	P M	55	(Japan) Kenji Kobayashi	7
(United Kingdom) JWA-Avila	Porsche 997 GT3-RSR	Porsche M97/74 4.0 L Flat-6	P M	55	(United Kingdom) Matt Bell	8
(United States) Krohn Racing	Ferrari 458 Italia GT2	Ferrari F136 4.5 L V8	D M	57	(Sweden) Niclas Jönsson	All
(United States) Krohn Racing	Ferrari 458 Italia GT2	Ferrari F136 4.5 L V8	D M	57	(United States) Tracy Krohn	All
(United States) Krohn Racing	Ferrari 458 Italia GT2	Ferrari F136 4.5 L V8	D M	57	(Italy) Michele Rugolo	All
(France) Luxury Racing	Ferrari 458 Italia GT2	Ferrari F136 4.5 L V8	M	58	(Germany) Pierre Ehret	1–3
(France) Luxury Racing	Ferrari 458 Italia GT2	Ferrari F136 4.5 L V8	M	58	(Germany) Dominik Farnbacher	1
(France) Luxury Racing	Ferrari 458 Italia GT2	Ferrari F136 4.5 L V8	M	58	(France) François Jakubowski	1
(France) Luxury Racing	Ferrari 458 Italia GT2	Ferrari F136 4.5 L V8	M	58	(United States) Gunnar Jeannette	2–3
(France) Luxury Racing	Ferrari 458 Italia GT2	Ferrari F136 4.5 L V8	M	58	(United States) Frankie Montecalvo	2–3
(United States) AF Corse-Waltrip	Ferrari 458 Italia GT2	Ferrari F136 4.5 L V8	M	61	(Portugal) Rui Águas	1–3, 6, 8
(United States) AF Corse-Waltrip	Ferrari 458 Italia GT2	Ferrari F136 4.5 L V8	M	61	(United States) Robert Kauffman	1–3, 6, 8
(United States) AF Corse-Waltrip	Ferrari 458 Italia GT2	Ferrari F136 4.5 L V8	M	61	(United States) Michael Waltrip	1
(United States) AF Corse-Waltrip	Ferrari 458 Italia GT2	Ferrari F136 4.5 L V8	M	61	(United States) Brian Vickers	2–3, 6
(United States) AF Corse-Waltrip	Ferrari 458 Italia GT2	Ferrari F136 4.5 L V8	M	61	(Italy) Piergiuseppe Perazzini	4
(United States) AF Corse-Waltrip	Ferrari 458 Italia GT2	Ferrari F136 4.5 L V8	M	61	(Republic of Ireland) Matt Griffin	4
(United States) AF Corse-Waltrip	Ferrari 458 Italia GT2	Ferrari F136 4.5 L V8	M	61	(Italy) Marco Cioci	4, 8
(United States) AF Corse-Waltrip	Ferrari 458 Italia GT2	Ferrari F136 4.5 L V8	M	61	(Brazil) Francisco Longo	5
(United States) AF Corse-Waltrip	Ferrari 458 Italia GT2	Ferrari F136 4.5 L V8	M	61	(Brazil) Xandinho Negrão	5
(United States) AF Corse-Waltrip	Ferrari 458 Italia GT2	Ferrari F136 4.5 L V8	M	61	(Brazil) Enrique Bernoldi	5
(Italy) AF Corse	Ferrari 458 Italia GT2	Ferrari F136 4.5 L V8	M	81	(Italy) Piergiuseppe Perazzini	2–3
(Italy) AF Corse	Ferrari 458 Italia GT2	Ferrari F136 4.5 L V8	M	81	(Republic of Ireland) Matt Griffin	2–3
(Italy) AF Corse	Ferrari 458 Italia GT2	Ferrari F136 4.5 L V8	M	81	(Italy) Marco Cioci	2
(Italy) AF Corse	Ferrari 458 Italia GT2	Ferrari F136 4.5 L V8	M	81	(Italy) Niki Cadei	3
(Germany) Team Felbermayr-Proton	Porsche 997 GT3-RSR	Porsche M97/74 4.0 L Flat-6	M	88	(Germany) Christian Ried	All
(Germany) Team Felbermayr-Proton	Porsche 997 GT3-RSR	Porsche M97/74 4.0 L Flat-6	M	88	(Italy) Gianluca Roda	All
(Germany) Team Felbermayr-Proton	Porsche 997 GT3-RSR	Porsche M97/74 4.0 L Flat-6	M	88	(Italy) Paolo Ruberti	All

== Results and standings ==
=== Race results ===
The highest finishing competitor entered in the World Endurance Championship is listed below. Invitational entries may have finished ahead of WEC competitors in individual races.

Rnd.	Circuit	LMP1 Winners	LMP2 Winners	LMGTE Pro Winners	LMGTE Am Winners	Report
1	Sebring	(Germany) No. 2 Audi Sport Team Joest	(United States) No. 44 Starworks Motorsport	(Italy) No. 71 AF Corse	(Germany) No. 88 Team Felbermayr-Proton	Report
1	Sebring	(United Kingdom) Allan McNish (Denmark) Tom Kristensen (Italy) Rinaldo Capello	(United Kingdom) Ryan Dalziel (Venezuela) Enzo Potolicchio (France) Stéphane Sarrazin	(Italy) Andrea Bertolini (Italy) Marco Cioci (Monaco) Olivier Beretta	(Germany) Christian Ried (Italy) Paolo Ruberti (Italy) Gianluca Roda	Report
2	Spa-Francorchamps	(Germany) No. 3 Audi Sport Team Joest	(United Kingdom) No. 25 ADR-Delta (Note: The LMP2 class winner for Spa-Francorchamps was the No. 38 Jota Sport invitational entry. As it was not a full-season WEC entrant, the points for the win were awarded to the No. 25 ADR-Delta entry.)	(Germany) No. 77 Team Felbermayr-Proton	(Germany) No. 88 Team Felbermayr-Proton (Note: The LMGTE Am class winner for Spa-Francorchamps was the No. 67 IMSA Performance Matmut invitational entry. As it was not a full-season WEC entrant, the points for the win were awarded to the No. 88 Team Felbermayr-Proton entry.)	Report
2	Spa-Francorchamps	(France) Romain Dumas (France) Loïc Duval (Spain) Marc Gené	(Australia) John Martin (United Kingdom) Robbie Kerr (Thailand) Tor Graves	(Germany) Marc Lieb (Austria) Richard Lietz	(Germany) Christian Ried (Italy) Gianluca Roda (Italy) Paolo Ruberti	Report
3	Le Mans	(Germany) No. 1 Audi Sport Team Joest	(United States) No. 44 Starworks Motorsport	(Italy) No. 51 AF Corse	(France) No. 50 Larbre Compétition	Report
3	Le Mans	(Switzerland) Marcel Fässler (France) Benoît Tréluyer (Germany) André Lotterer	(United Kingdom) Ryan Dalziel (Venezuela) Enzo Potolicchio (United Kingdom) Tom Kimber-Smith	(Italy) Gianmaria Bruni (Italy) Giancarlo Fisichella (Finland) Toni Vilander	(France) Patrick Bornhauser (France) Julien Canal (Portugal) Pedro Lamy	Report
4	Silverstone	(Germany) No. 1 Audi Sport Team Joest	(United Kingdom) No. 25 ADR-Delta	(Italy) No. 51 AF Corse	(Italy) No. 61 AF Corse-Waltrip	Report
4	Silverstone	(Switzerland) Marcel Fässler (France) Benoît Tréluyer (Germany) André Lotterer	(Czech Republic) Jan Charouz (Thailand) Tor Graves (Australia) John Martin	(Italy) Giancarlo Fisichella (Italy) Gianmaria Bruni	(Italy) Piergiuseppe Perazzini (Italy) Marco Cioci (Republic of Ireland) Matt Griffin	Report
5	São Paulo	(Japan) No. 7 Toyota Racing	(United States) No. 44 Starworks Motorsport	(Italy) No. 51 AF Corse	(Germany) No. 88 Team Felbermayr-Proton	Report
5	São Paulo	(Austria) Alexander Wurz (France) Nicolas Lapierre	(United Kingdom) Ryan Dalziel (Venezuela) Enzo Potolicchio (France) Stéphane Sarrazin	(Italy) Giancarlo Fisichella (Italy) Gianmaria Bruni	(Germany) Christian Ried (Italy) Gianluca Roda (Italy) Paolo Ruberti	Report
6	Bahrain	(Germany) No. 1 Audi Sport Team Joest	(Argentina) No. 49 Pecom Racing	(Italy) No. 51 AF Corse	(Germany) No. 88 Team Felbermayr-Proton	Report
6	Bahrain	(Switzerland) Marcel Fässler (France) Benoît Tréluyer (Germany) André Lotterer	(Argentina) Luis Pérez Companc (France) Nicolas Minassian (Germany) Pierre Kaffer	(Italy) Giancarlo Fisichella (Finland) Toni Vilander	(Germany) Christian Ried (Italy) Gianluca Roda (Italy) Paolo Ruberti	Report
7	Fuji	(Japan) No. 7 Toyota Racing	(United Kingdom) No. 25 ADR-Delta	(Germany) No. 77 Team Felbermayr-Proton	(France) No. 50 Larbre Compétition	Report
7	Fuji	(Austria) Alexander Wurz (France) Nicolas Lapierre (Japan) Kazuki Nakajima	(Thailand) Tor Graves (Australia) John Martin (Japan) Shinji Nakano	(Germany) Marc Lieb (Austria) Richard Lietz	(France) Patrick Bornhauser (France) Julien Canal (Portugal) Pedro Lamy	Report
8	Shanghai	(Japan) No. 7 Toyota Racing	(United Kingdom) No. 25 ADR-Delta	(United Kingdom) No. 97 Aston Martin Racing	(France) No. 50 Larbre Compétition	Report
8	Shanghai	(Austria) Alexander Wurz (France) Nicolas Lapierre	(Thailand) Tor Graves (Australia) John Martin (Switzerland) Mathias Beche	(Germany) Stefan Mücke (United Kingdom) Darren Turner	(France) Patrick Bornhauser (France) Julien Canal (Portugal) Pedro Lamy	Report

=== Championships ===
Entries were required to complete the timed race as well as to complete 70% of the overall winning car's race distance in order to earn championship points. A single bonus point was awarded to the team and all drivers of the pole position car in qualifying in each category. For the 24 Hours of Le Mans, the points allocation was doubled.

Points systems
Duration	1st	2nd	3rd	4th	5th	6th	7th	8th	9th	10th	Other	Pole
6–12 Hours	25	18	15	12	10	8	6	4	2	1	0.5	1
24 Hours	50	36	30	24	20	16	12	8	4	2	1	1

==== Drivers' World Championship ====
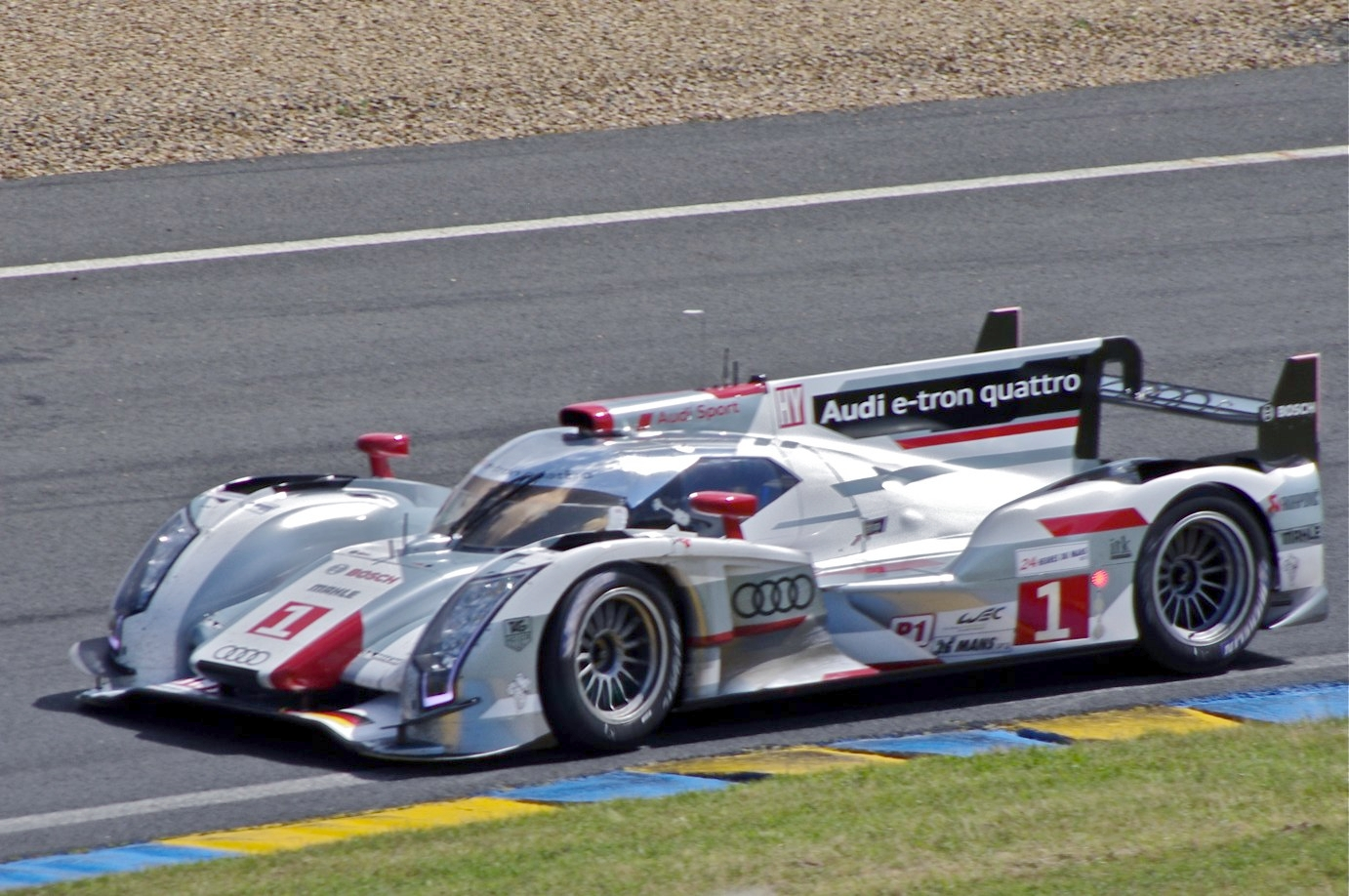
André Lotterer, Benoît Tréluyer and Marcel Fässler won the World Endurance Championship for Drivers

André Lotterer, Benoît Tréluyer and Marcel Fässler won the Drivers' World Championship at the 6 Hours of Shanghai. They had won three races including the 24 Hours of Le Mans driving the No.1 car of Audi Sport Team Joest.

Pos.	Driver	Team	SEB (United States)	SPA (Belgium)	LMS (France)	SIL (United Kingdom)	SÃO (Brazil)	BHR (Bahrain)	FUJ (Japan)	SHA (China)	Total points
1=	(Germany) André Lotterer	(Germany) Audi Sport Team Joest	**11**	2	**1**	**1**	2	1	2	3	172.5
1=	(France) Benoît Tréluyer	(Germany) Audi Sport Team Joest	**11**	2	**1**	**1**	2	1	2	3	172.5
1=	(Switzerland) Marcel Fässler	(Germany) Audi Sport Team Joest	**11**	2	**1**	**1**	2	1	2	3	172.5
2=	(United Kingdom) Allan McNish	(Germany) Audi Sport Team Joest	1	**3**	2	3	3	**2**	3	2	159
2=	(Denmark) Tom Kristensen	(Germany) Audi Sport Team Joest	1	**3**	2	3	3	**2**	3	2	159
3=	(Austria) Alexander Wurz	(Japan) Toyota Racing			Ret	2	**1**	Ret	**1**	**1**	96
3=	(France) Nicolas Lapierre	(Japan) Toyota Racing			Ret	2	**1**	Ret	**1**	**1**	96
4=	(France) Nicolas Prost	(Switzerland) Rebellion Racing	17	4	3	6	4	4	4	Ret	86.5
4=	(Switzerland) Neel Jani	(Switzerland) Rebellion Racing	17	4	3	6	4	4	4	Ret	86.5
5	(Italy) Rinaldo Capello	(Germany) Audi Sport Team Joest	1	**3**	2						77
6=	(France) Romain Dumas	(Germany) Audi Sport Team Joest	2	1	4						67
6=	(France) Loïc Duval	(Germany) Audi Sport Team Joest	2	1	4						67
7=	(United Kingdom) Nick Leventis	(United Kingdom) Strakka Racing	8	6	22	5	5	3	6	6	64
7=	(United Kingdom) Jonny Kane	(United Kingdom) Strakka Racing	8	6	22	5	5	3	6	6	64
7=	(United Kingdom) Danny Watts	(United Kingdom) Strakka Racing	8	6	22	5	5	3	6	6	64
8=	(Switzerland) Harold Primat	(Switzerland) Rebellion Racing	19	5	9	4	6	5	7	4	62.5
8=	(Italy) Andrea Belicchi	(Switzerland) Rebellion Racing	19	5	9	4	6	5	7	4	62.5
9	(Venezuela) Enzo Potolicchio	(United States) Starworks Motorsport	3	29	6	**9**	**7**	**8**	**9**	8	53.5
10=	(United Kingdom) Peter Dumbreck	(United Kingdom) JRM	12	9	5	7	9	Ret	5	5	50.5
10=	(Australia) David Brabham	(United Kingdom) JRM	12	9	5	7	9	Ret	5	5	50.5
10=	(India) Karun Chandhok	(United Kingdom) JRM	12	9	5	7	9	Ret	5	5	50.5
11	(Spain) Marc Gené	(Germany) Audi Sport Team Joest		1	4						49
12	(United Kingdom) Ryan Dalziel	(United States) Starworks Motorsport	3	29	6	**9**	**7**		**9**	8	48.5
13	(Japan) Kazuki Nakajima	(Japan) Toyota Racing			Ret	2			**1**		44
14	(Germany) Nick Heidfeld	(Switzerland) Rebellion Racing	17	4	3						42.5
15	(France) Stéphane Sarrazin	(United States) Starworks Motorsport	3	29		**9**	**7**	**8**	**9**	8	37.5
15	(France) Stéphane Sarrazin	(Japan) Toyota Racing			Ret						37.5
16=	(Germany) Pierre Kaffer	(Argentina) Pecom Racing	6	20	7	11	8	6	11	10	34.5
16=	(Argentina) Luis Pérez Companc	(Argentina) Pecom Racing	6	20	7	11	8	6	11	10	34.5
17=	(Thailand) Tor Graves	(United Kingdom) ADR-Delta	9	**7**	**11**	8	12	20	8	7	26
17=	(Australia) John Martin	(United Kingdom) ADR-Delta	9	**7**	**11**	8	12	20	8	7	26
18	(France) Soheil Ayari	(Argentina) Pecom Racing	6	20	7	11					21
19	(United Kingdom) Tom Kimber-Smith	(United States) Starworks Motorsport			6			**8**			21
20=	(France) Olivier Pla	(France) OAK Racing	**4**	13	Ret	13	10	11	10	9	18.5
20=	(France) Jacques Nicolet	(France) OAK Racing	**4**	13	Ret	13	10	11	10	9	18.5
21	(Germany) Timo Bernhard	(Germany) Audi Sport Team Joest	2								18
22	(Brazil) Lucas di Grassi	(Germany) Audi Sport Team Joest					3				15
23	(France) Nicolas Minassian	(France) Pescarolo Team		11	NC						14
23	(France) Nicolas Minassian	(Argentina) Pecom Racing					8	6	11	10	14
24	(China) Congfu Cheng	(Switzerland) Rebellion Racing								4	12
25=	(France) Pierre Ragues	(France) Signatech-Nissan		25	8	10	14	10	EX	13	11.5
25=	(France) Nelson Panciatici	(France) Signatech-Nissan		25	8	10	14	10	EX	13	11.5
25=	(Russia) Roman Rusinov	(France) Signatech-Nissan		25	8	10	14	10	EX	13	11.5
26=	(United States) Elton Julian	(United Kingdom) Greaves Motorsport	7	12	10	17	11	12	14	15	11
26=	(Germany) Christian Zugel	(United Kingdom) Greaves Motorsport	7	12	10	17	11	12	14	15	11
27	(Mexico) Ricardo González	(United Kingdom) Greaves Motorsport	7	12	10	17		12	14	15	10.5
28=	(France) Emmanuel Collard	(France) Pescarolo Team	5		Ret						10
28=	(France) Jean-Christophe Boullion	(France) Pescarolo Team	5		DNS						10
28=	(France) Julien Jousse	(France) Pescarolo Team	5								10
29	(United Kingdom) Robbie Kerr	(United Kingdom) ADR-Delta	9	**7**							9
30=	(France) Olivier Lombard	(France) Signatech-Nissan	Ret	28	14	Ret	Ret	7	15	11	8.5
30=	(France) Jordan Tresson	(France) Signatech-Nissan	Ret	28	14	Ret	Ret	7	15	11	8.5
31	(France) Franck Mailleux	(France) Signatech-Nissan	Ret	28^{†}	14	Ret	Ret	7	15	11	8
32	(Czech Republic) Jan Charouz	(United Kingdom) ADR-Delta			**11**	8	12				7.5
32	(Czech Republic) Jan Charouz	(Germany) Lotus								**Ret**	7.5
33=	(United Kingdom) Darren Turner	(United Kingdom) Aston Martin Racing	18	Ret	17	19	**17**	**14**	19	**16**	7
33=	(Germany) Stefan Mücke	(United Kingdom) Aston Martin Racing	18	Ret	17	19	**17**	**14**	19	**16**	7
34	(France) Matthieu Lahaye	(France) OAK Racing	**4**^{†}	13	Ret	13	10	11	10	9	6.5
35	(Switzerland) Mathias Beche	(United Kingdom) ADR-Delta								7	6
36	(Denmark) David Heinemeier Hansson	(France) OAK Racing		8	12	14					5.5
37=	(Germany) Marc Lieb	(Germany) Team Felbermayr-Proton	14	14	Ret	**23**	18	15	**17**	17	5.5
37=	(Austria) Richard Lietz	(Germany) Team Felbermayr-Proton	14	14	Ret	**23**	18	15	**17**	17	5.5
38=	(Italy) Paolo Ruberti	(Germany) Team Felbermayr-Proton	15	19	Ret	**21**	20	17	23	**20**	5.5
38=	(Italy) Gianluca Roda	(Germany) Team Felbermayr-Proton	15	19	Ret	**21**	20	17	23	**20**	5.5
38=	(Germany) Christian Ried	(Germany) Team Felbermayr-Proton	15	19	Ret	**21**	20	17	23	**20**	5.5
39	(Belgium) Bas Leinders	(France) OAK Racing		8	12						5
40=	(France) Jean-Philippe Belloc	(France) Larbre Compétition	16	Ret	21	25	21	22	**24**	23	5
40=	(France) Pascal Gibon	(France) Larbre Compétition	16		21	25	21	22	**24**	23	5
Pos.	Driver	Team	SEB (United States)	SPA (Belgium)	LMS (France)	SIL (United Kingdom)	SÃO (Brazil)	BHR (Bahrain)	FUJ (Japan)	SHA (China)	Total points

Colour	Result
Gold	Winner
Silver	Second place
Bronze	Third place
Green	Points classification
Blue	Non-points classification
Blue	Non-classified finish (NC)
Purple	Retired, not classified (Ret)
Red	Did not qualify (DNQ)
Red	Did not pre-qualify (DNPQ)
Black	Disqualified (DSQ)
White	Did not start (DNS)
White	Withdrew (WD)
White	Race cancelled (C)
Blank	Did not practice (DNP)
Blank	Did not arrive (DNA)
Blank	Excluded (EX)

**Bold** - Pole position in each category

Notes

- † — Drivers were classified, but did not score as they drove for less than the required minimum time during the race.

==== Manufacturers' World Championship ====
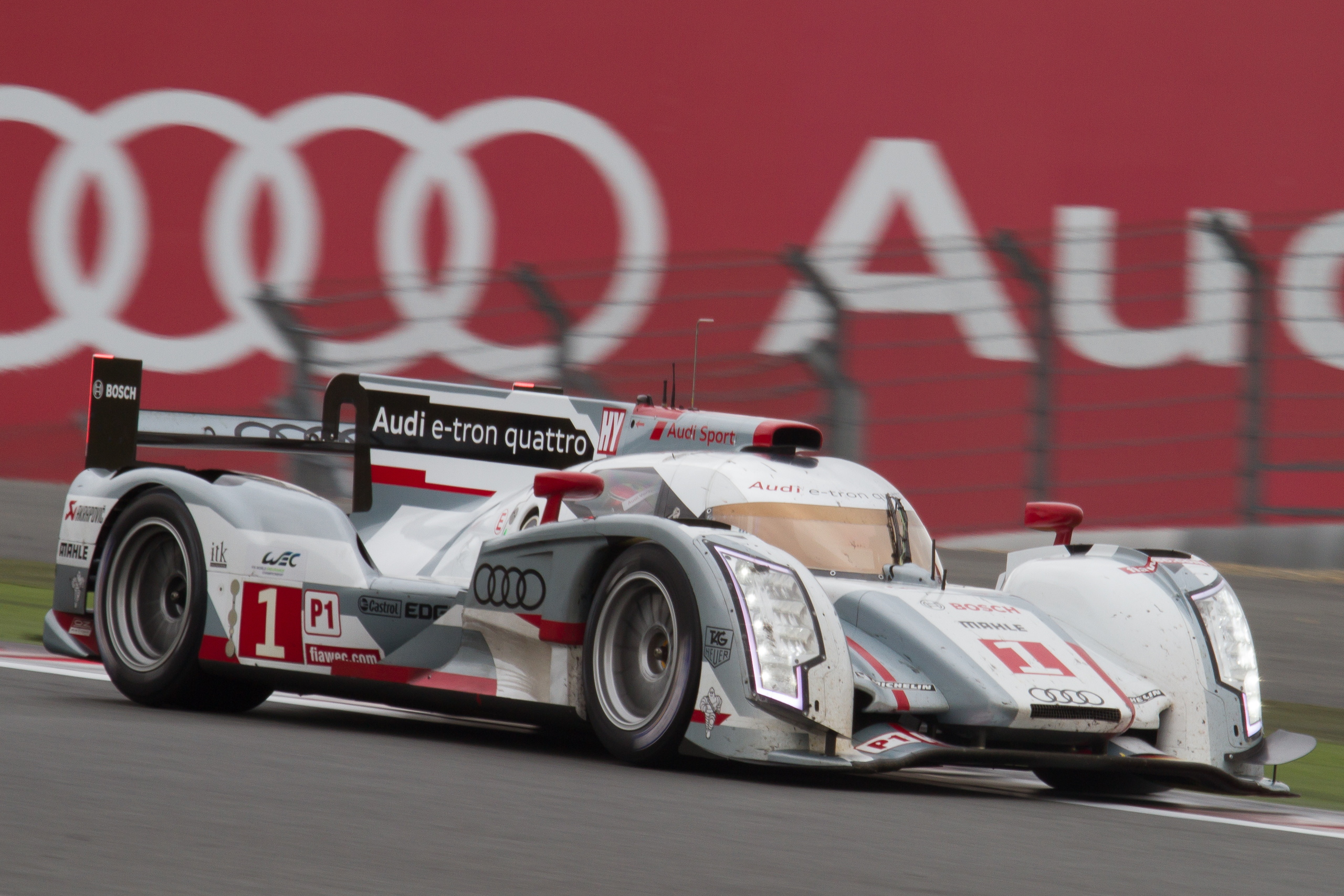
Audi won the World Endurance Championship for LMP1 Manufacturers with the R18

The FIA LMP1 Manufacturers' World Endurance Championship was open to full-season manufacturer entries participating in the LMP1 category. Points were only awarded to the highest scoring entry for that manufacturer for each event. Further, only the scores from six events counted towards the championship, Le Mans plus the five best race results over the season. Audi secured the Manufacturers' World Championship at the 6 Hours of Silverstone following four consecutive victories in the first half of the championship.

Pos.	Manufacturer	SEB (United States)	SPA (Belgium)	LMS (France)	SIL (United Kingdom)	SÃO (Brazil)	BHR (Bahrain)	FUJ (Japan)	SHA (China)	Total points
1	(Germany) Audi	**1**	**1**	**1**	**1**	2	**1**	2	2	173 (209)
2	(Japan) Toyota			Ret	2	**1**	Ret	**1**	**1**	96

==== Manufacturers' World Cup ====
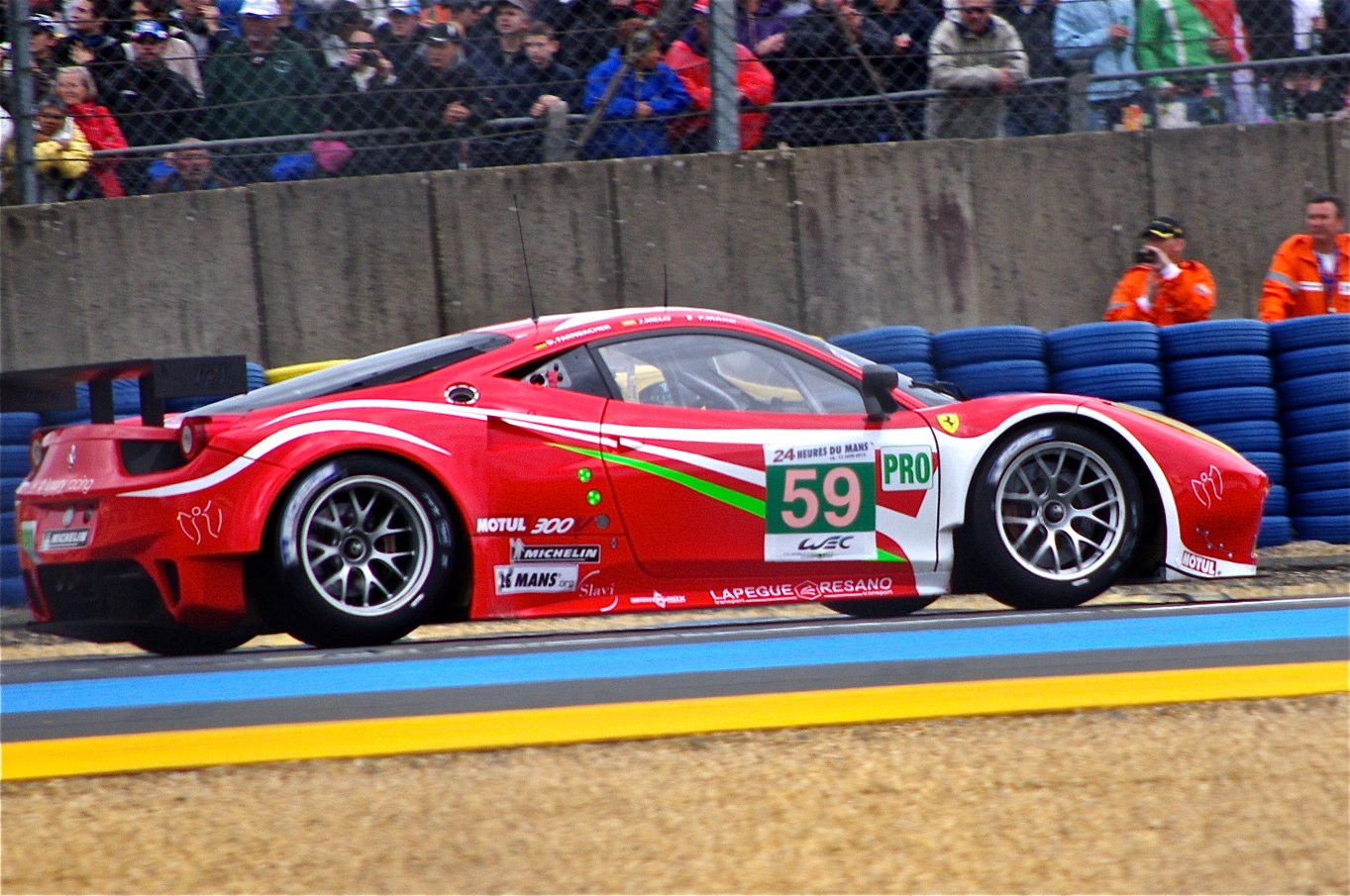
Ferrari won the World Cup for LMGTE Manufacturers with the Ferrari 458 Italia

The LMGTE Manufacturers' World Cup was open to full-season manufacturer entries participating in either of the two LMGTE categories. Results in the LMGTE Pro and LMGTE Am categories were combined for the World Cup. Only the two best classified cars of the same manufacturer in an event scored points for the World Cup. Ferrari secured the Manufacturers' World Cup title at the 6 Hours of Bahrain following four consecutive victories.

Pos.	Manufacturer	SEB (United States)	SPA (Belgium)	LMS (France)	SIL (United Kingdom)	SÃO (Brazil)	BHR (Bahrain)	FUJ (Japan)	SHA (China)	Total points
1	(Italy) Ferrari	1	2	1	1	1	1	2	2	338
1	(Italy) Ferrari	6	**3**	**2**	2	3	3	3	5	338
2	(Germany) Porsche	2	1	8	3	2	2	**1**	1	233
2	(Germany) Porsche	3	5	Ret	**5**	4	4	6	4	233
3	(United States) Chevrolet	4	6	3	6	5	7	4	3	143
3	(United States) Chevrolet	5	Ret	6	EX	EX	8	7	7	143

==== LMP1 Trophy ====
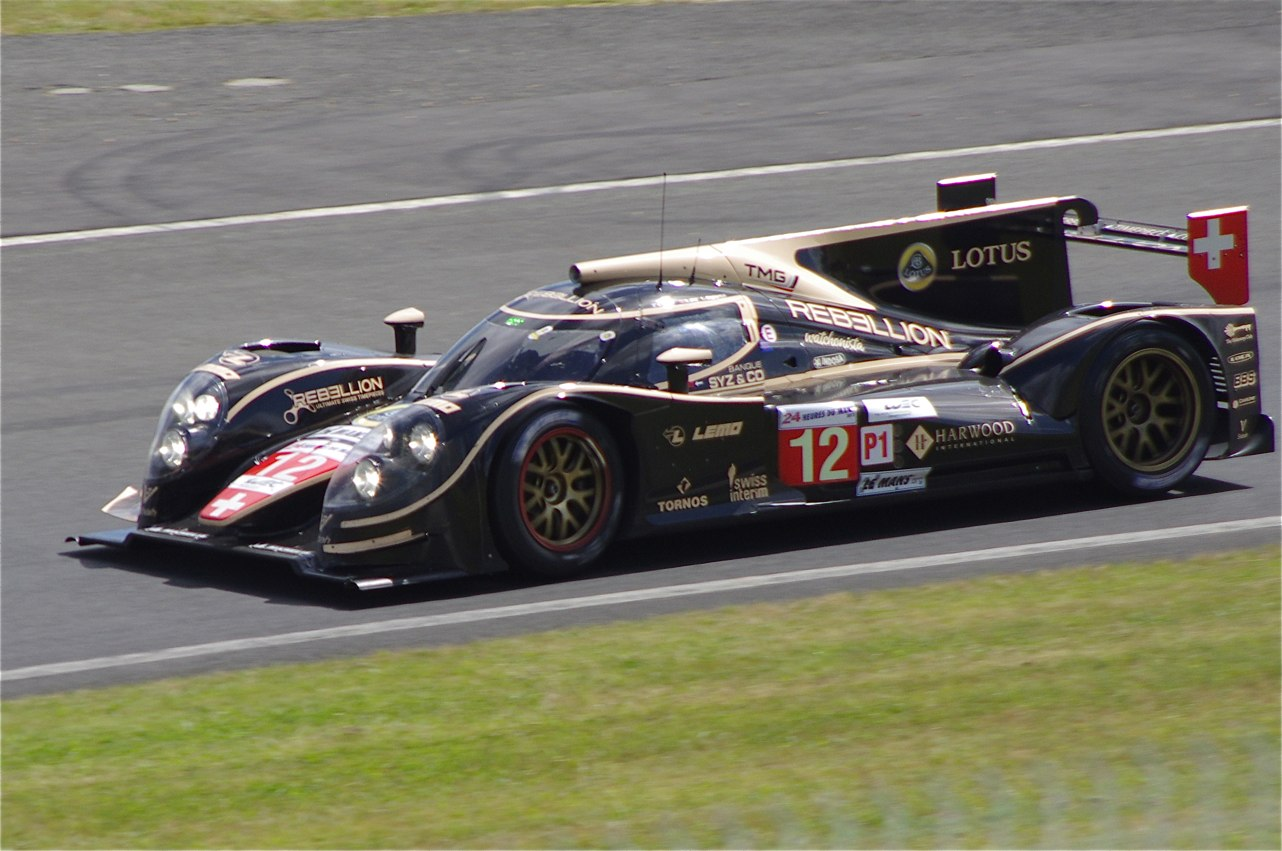
Rebellion Racing won the FIA Endurance Trophy for Private LMP1 Teams with their Lola B12/60s

The FIA Endurance Trophy for LMP1 Teams was open to full-season privateer LMP1 entries not designated as manufacturers. Only the best classified car of a team at each event scored points for the Trophy. Rebellion Racing secured the LMP1 Trophy at the 6 Hours of Fuji, winning five of the first seven races in the season including five races with both team cars on the privateer podium.

Pos.	Team	SEB (United States)	SPA (Belgium)	LMS (France)	SIL (United Kingdom)	SÃO (Brazil)	BHR (Bahrain)	FUJ (Japan)	SHA (China)	Total points
1	(Switzerland) Rebellion Racing	4	1	1	1	1	2	1	1	205
2	(United Kingdom) Strakka Racing	2	3	4	2	2	1	3	3	148
3	(United Kingdom) JRM	3	4	2	4	4	Ret	2	2	123
4	(France) OAK Racing	6	Ret	Ret				5	4	30
5	(France) Pescarolo Team	1		Ret						25

==== LMP2 Trophy ====
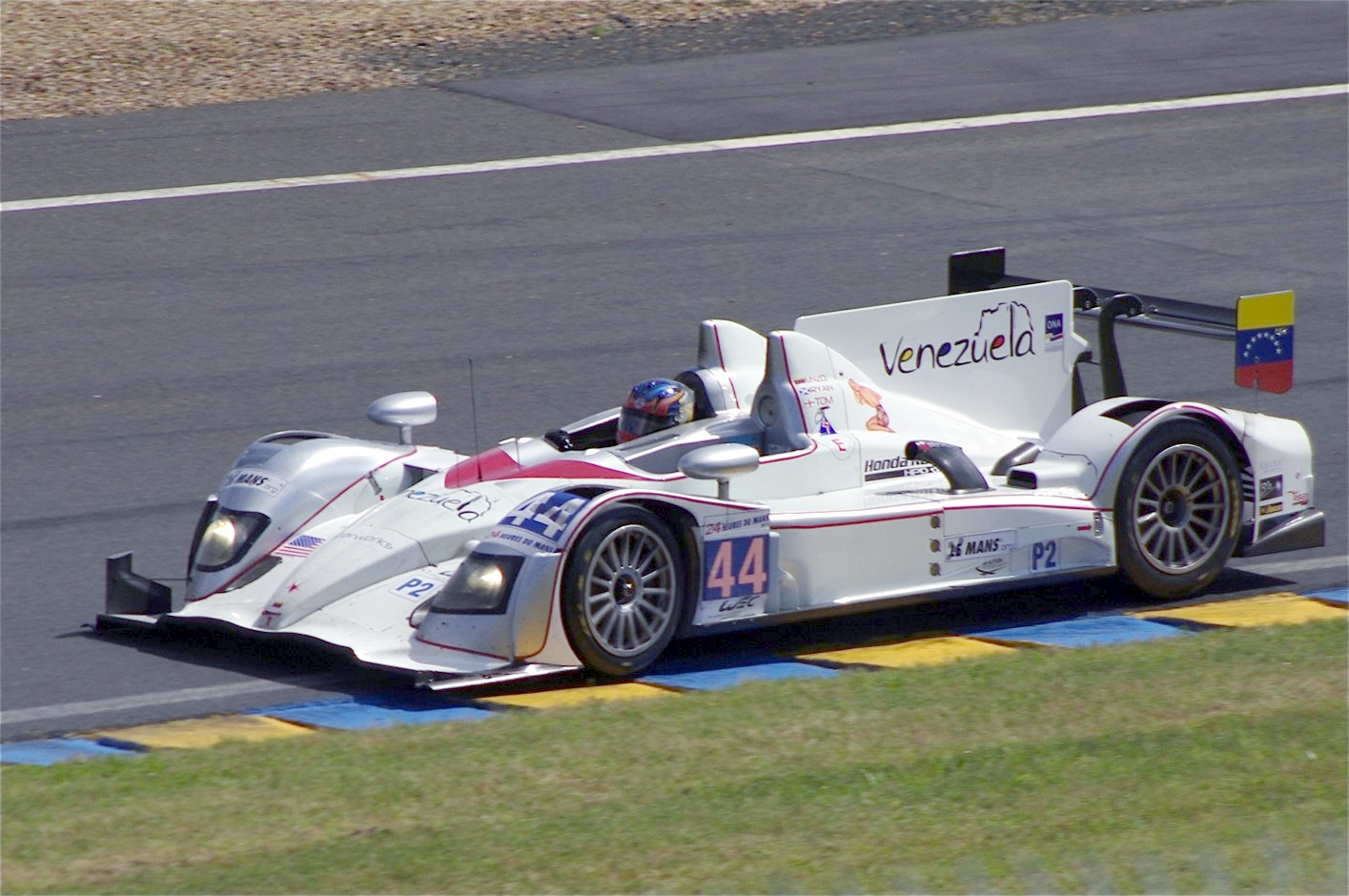
Starworks Motorsport won the FIA Endurance Trophy for LMP2 Teams with their HPD ARX-03b Honda

Starworks Motorsport earned the LMP2 Trophy at the 6 Hours of Fuji, winning three races and earning four class pole positions.

Pos.	Team	SEB (United States)	SPA (Belgium)	LMS (France)	SIL (United Kingdom)	SÃO (Brazil)	BHR (Bahrain)	FUJ (Japan)	SHA (China)	Total points
1	(United States) Starworks Motorsport	1	8	1	**2**	**1**	**3**	**2**	2	177
2	(United Kingdom) ADR-Delta	5	**1**	**4**	1	5	6	1	**1**	154
3	(Argentina) PeCom Racing	3	6	2	3	2	1	4	4	141
4	(France) OAK Racing	**2**	4	Ret	4	3	4	3	3	100
5	(United Kingdom) Greaves Motorsport	4	3	3	7	4	5	6	7	99
6	(France) Signatech-Nissan	Ret	7	5	Ret	Ret	2	7	5	60
7	(United Arab Emirates) Gulf Racing Middle East	7	2	Ret	5	7	Ret	5	Ret	44
8	(Germany) Lotus	6	Ret	Ret	6	6	Ret	Ret	6	32

==== LMGTE Pro Trophy ====
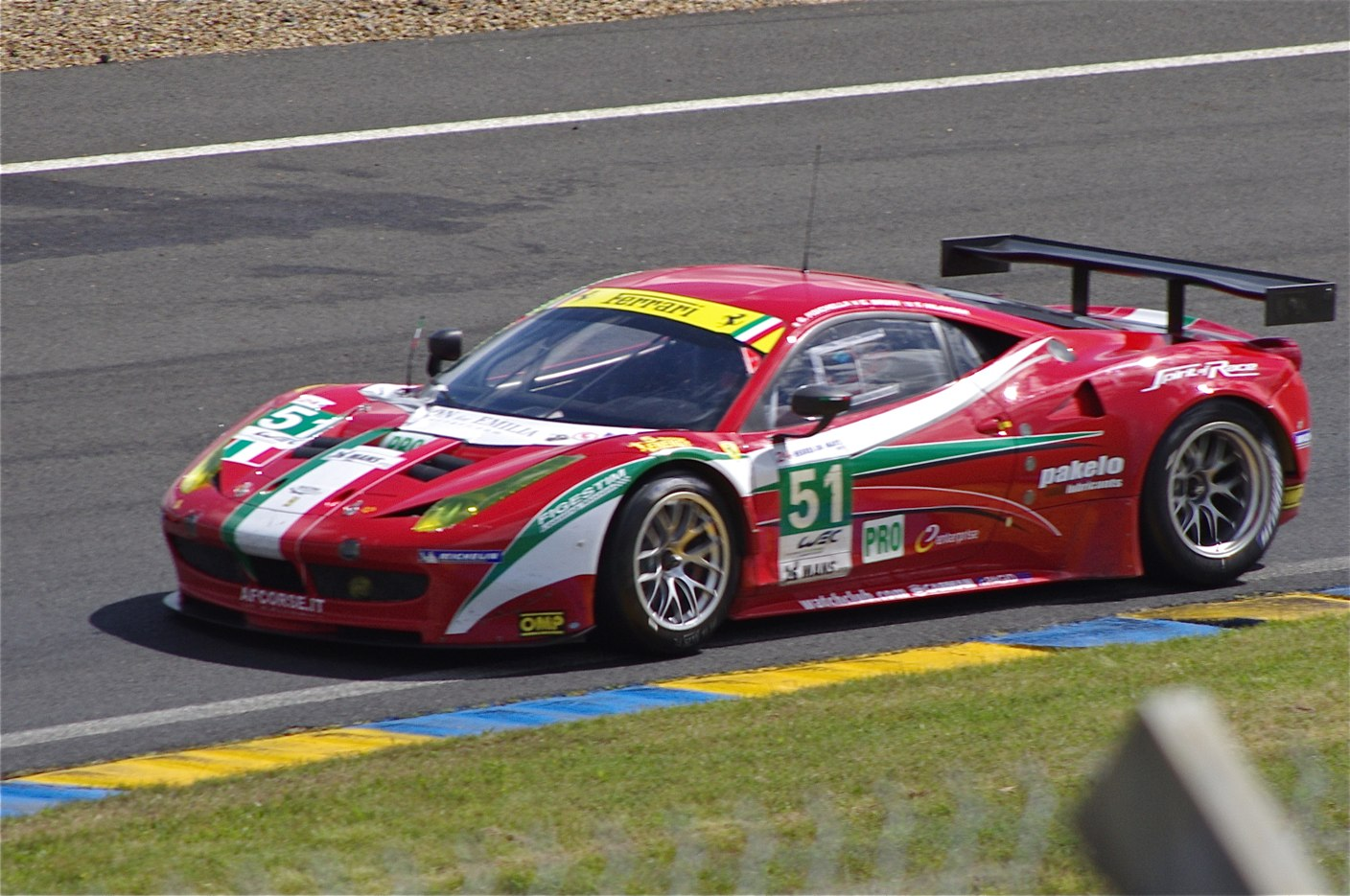
AF Corse won the FIA Endurance Trophy for LMGTE PRO Teams with their Ferrari 458 Italias

The LMGTE Pro Trophy was won by AF Corse, who secured the championship at the 6 Hours of Bahrain. The team had finished every race of the season in either first or second place with either of their two Ferraris.

Pos.	Team	SEB (United States)	SPA (Belgium)	LMS (France)	SIL (United Kingdom)	SÃO (Brazil)	BHR (Bahrain)	FUJ (Japan)	SHA (China)	Total points
1	(Italy) AF Corse	1	2	1	1	1	1	2	3	201
2	(United Kingdom) Aston Martin Racing	3	Ret	3	2	**2**	**2**	3	**1**	142
3	(Germany) Team Felbermayr-Proton	2	1	Ret	**3**	3	3	**1**	2	133
4	(France) Luxury Racing	Ret	**3**	**2**						53

==== LMGTE Am Trophy ====
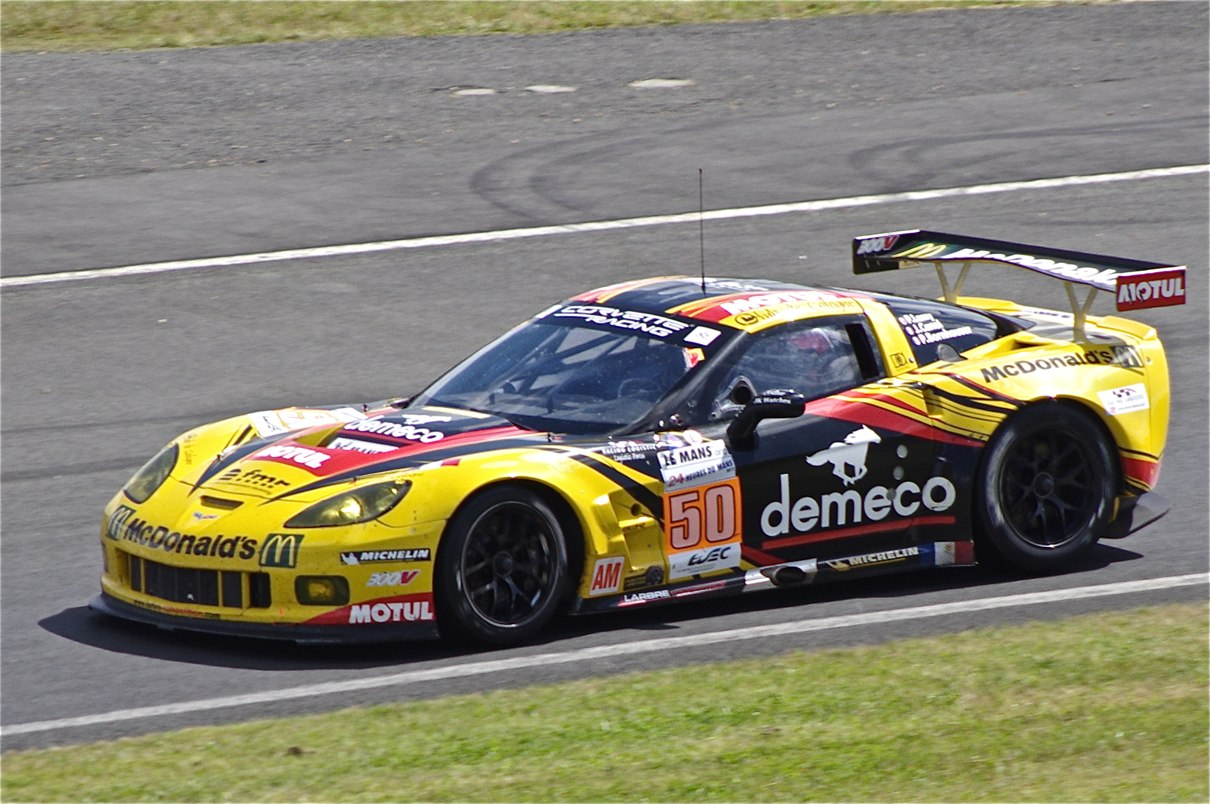
Larbre Compétition won the FIA Endurance Trophy for LMGTE AM Teams with their Chevrolet Corvettes

Larbre Compétition won the LMGTE Am Trophy at the 6 Hours of Shanghai, winning three races with either of their two Chevrolet Corvettes.

Pos.	Team	SEB (United States)	SPA (Belgium)	LMS (France)	SIL (United Kingdom)	SÃO (Brazil)	BHR (Bahrain)	FUJ (Japan)	SHA (China)	Total points
1	(France) Larbre Compétition	2	2	1	4	2	4	**1**	1	179
2	(Germany) Team Felbermayr-Proton	1	1	Ret	**2**	1	1	3	**2**	153
3	(United States) Krohn Racing	5	5	2	3	Ret	3	2	3	119
4	(Italy) AF Corse-Waltrip	4	DNS	4	1	**3**	**2**		4	108
5	(United Kingdom) JWA-Avila	6	4	5	5	4	6	5	6	88
6	(France) Luxury Racing	**DNS**	**3**	**Ret**						18
