= 2012 6 Hours of São Paulo =

Sports car endurance race held at Autódromo José Carlos Pace, São Paulo

Coordinates: 23°42′13″S 46°41′59″W

(Brazil) 2012 6 Hours of São Paulo
Event information
- Round 5 of 8 in the 2012 FIA World Endurance Championship
- Date: 15 September 2012
- Location: São Paulo
- Venue: Autódromo José Carlos Pace
- Duration: 6 Hours

Results
- Laps completed: 247
- Distance (km): 1064.323
- Distance (miles): 661.219
- LMP1

Pole position
- Time: 1:22.363
- Team: (Japan) Toyota Racing
- Drivers: (Austria) Alexander Wurz

Winners
- Team: (Japan) Toyota Racing
- Drivers: (Austria) Alexander Wurz (France) Nicolas Lapierre
- LMP2

Winners
- Team: (United States) Starworks Motorsport
- Drivers: (United Kingdom) Ryan Dalziel (Venezuela) Enzo Potolicchio (France) Stéphane Sarrazin
- LMGTE Pro

Winners
- Team: (Italy) AF Corse
- Drivers: (Italy) Gianmaria Bruni (Italy) Giancarlo Fisichella
- LMGTE Am

Winners
- Team: (Germany) Team Felbermayr-Proton
- Drivers: (Germany) Christian Ried (Italy) Gianluca Roda (Italy) Paolo Ruberti

The 2012 6 Hours of São Paulo was held at Autódromo José Carlos Pace, São Paulo on Saturday 15 September 2012, and was the fifth round of the 2012 FIA World Endurance Championship. Toyota claimed its first FIA World Endurance Championship victory at the event.

== Qualifying ==
=== Qualifying result ===
Pole position winners in each class are marked in bold.

Pos	Class	Team	Driver	Lap Time	Grid
**1**	**LMP1**	**#7 Toyota Racing**	**Alexander Wurz**	**1:22.363**	**1**
2	LMP1	#2 Audi Sport Team Joest	Lucas di Grassi	1:23.147	2
3	LMP1	#1 Audi Sport Team Joest	André Lotterer	1:23.332	3
4	LMP1	#12 Rebellion Racing	Neel Jani	1:23.962	4
5	LMP1	#21 Strakka Racing	Danny Watts	1:24.089	5
6	LMP1	#13 Rebellion Racing	Andrea Belicchi	1:24.179	6
7	LMP1	#22 JRM	Peter Dumbreck	1:24.320	7
**8**	**LMP2**	**#44 Starworks Motorsport**	**Stéphane Sarrazin**	**1:27.048**	**8**
9	LMP2	#25 ADR-Delta	John Martin	1:27.153	9
10	LMP2	#26 Signatech-Nissan	Nelson Panciatici	1:27.167	10
11	LMP2	#35 OAK Racing	Bertrand Baguette	1:27.275	11
12	LMP2	#32 Lotus	Vitantonio Liuzzi	1:27.338	12
13	LMP2	#23 Signatech-Nissan	Franck Mailleux	1:27.452	13
14	LMP2	#41 Greaves Motorsport	Elton Julian	1:27.769	14
15	LMP2	#24 OAK Racing	Matthieu Lahaye	1:27.818	15
16	LMP2	#49 Pecom Racing	Pierre Kaffer	1:27.968	16
17	LMP2	#31 Lotus	Thomas Holzer	1:28.958	17
18	LMP2	#29 Gulf Racing Middle East	Fabien Giroix	1:30.871	18
**19**	**LMGTE Pro**	**#97 Aston Martin Racing**	**Darren Turner**	**1:33.855**	**19**
20	LMGTE Pro	#77 Team Felbermayr-Proton	Marc Lieb	1:34.040	20
21	LMGTE Pro	#51 AF Corse	Giancarlo Fisichella	1:34.203	21
22	LMGTE Pro	#71 AF Corse	Andrea Bertolini	1:34.733	22
**23**	**LMGTE Am**	**#61 AF Corse-Waltrip**	**Enrique Bernoldi**	**1:34.781**	**23**
24	LMGTE Am	#57 Krohn Racing	Michele Rugolo	1:35.401	24
25	LMGTE Am	#88 Team Felbermayr-Proton	Paolo Ruberti	1:35.485	25
26	LMGTE Am	#50 Larbre Compétition	Fernando Rees	1:35.485	26
27	LMGTE Am	#55 JWA-Avila	Markus Palttala	1:36.800	27
28	LMGTE Am	#70 Larbre Compétition	Pascal Gibon	1:38.792	28

== Race ==
=== Race result ===
Class winners in bold. Cars failing to complete 70% of winner's distance marked as Not Classified (NC).

Pos	Class	No	Team	Drivers	Chassis	Tyre	Laps
Pos	Class	No	Team	Drivers	Engine	Tyre	Laps
1	**LMP1**	**7**	**(Japan) Toyota Racing**	**(Austria) Alexander Wurz (France) Nicolas Lapierre**	**Toyota TS030 Hybrid**	MI	**247**
1	**LMP1**	**7**	**(Japan) Toyota Racing**	**(Austria) Alexander Wurz (France) Nicolas Lapierre**	**Toyota RV8KLM 3.4 L V8 (Hybrid)**	MI	**247**
2	LMP1	1	(Germany) Audi Sport Team Joest	(Germany) André Lotterer (Switzerland) Marcel Fässler (France) Benoît Tréluyer	Audi R18 e-tron quattro	MI	247
2	LMP1	1	(Germany) Audi Sport Team Joest	(Germany) André Lotterer (Switzerland) Marcel Fässler (France) Benoît Tréluyer	Audi TDI 3.7 L Turbo V6 (Hybrid Diesel)	MI	247
3	LMP1	2	(Germany) Audi Sport Team Joest	(United Kingdom) Allan McNish (Denmark) Tom Kristensen (Brazil) Lucas di Grassi	Audi R18 ultra	MI	247
3	LMP1	2	(Germany) Audi Sport Team Joest	(United Kingdom) Allan McNish (Denmark) Tom Kristensen (Brazil) Lucas di Grassi	Audi TDI 3.7 L Turbo V6 (Diesel)	MI	247
4	LMP1	12	(Switzerland) Rebellion Racing	(France) Nico Prost (Switzerland) Neel Jani	Lola B12/60	MI	242
4	LMP1	12	(Switzerland) Rebellion Racing	(France) Nico Prost (Switzerland) Neel Jani	Toyota RV8KLM 3.4 L V8	MI	242
5	LMP1	21	(United Kingdom) Strakka Racing	(United Kingdom) Nick Leventis (United Kingdom) Jonny Kane (United Kingdom) Danny Watts	HPD ARX-03a	MI	240
5	LMP1	21	(United Kingdom) Strakka Racing	(United Kingdom) Nick Leventis (United Kingdom) Jonny Kane (United Kingdom) Danny Watts	Honda LM-V8 3.4 L V8	MI	240
6	LMP1	13	(Switzerland) Rebellion Racing	(Italy) Andrea Belicchi (Switzerland) Harold Primat	Lola B12/60	MI	240
6	LMP1	13	(Switzerland) Rebellion Racing	(Italy) Andrea Belicchi (Switzerland) Harold Primat	Toyota RV8KLM 3.4 L V8	MI	240
7	**LMP2**	**44**	**(United States) Starworks Motorsport**	**(United Kingdom) Ryan Dalziel (Venezuela) Enzo Potolicchio (France) Stéphane Sarrazin**	**HPD ARX-03b**	D	**234**
7	**LMP2**	**44**	**(United States) Starworks Motorsport**	**(United Kingdom) Ryan Dalziel (Venezuela) Enzo Potolicchio (France) Stéphane Sarrazin**	**Honda HR28TT 2.8 L Turbo V6**	D	**234**
8	LMP2	49	(Argentina) Pecom Racing	(Argentina) Luis Pérez Companc (France) Nicolas Minassian (Germany) Pierre Kaffer	Oreca 03	D	231
8	LMP2	49	(Argentina) Pecom Racing	(Argentina) Luis Pérez Companc (France) Nicolas Minassian (Germany) Pierre Kaffer	Nissan VK45DE 4.5 L V8	D	231
9	LMP1	22	(United Kingdom) JRM	(United Kingdom) Peter Dumbreck (Australia) David Brabham (India) Karun Chandhok	HPD ARX-03a	MI	230
9	LMP1	22	(United Kingdom) JRM	(United Kingdom) Peter Dumbreck (Australia) David Brabham (India) Karun Chandhok	Honda LM-V8 3.4 L V8	MI	230
10	LMP2	24	(France) OAK Racing	(France) Jacques Nicolet (France) Olivier Pla (France) Matthieu Lahaye	Morgan LMP2	D	230
10	LMP2	24	(France) OAK Racing	(France) Jacques Nicolet (France) Olivier Pla (France) Matthieu Lahaye	Nissan VK45DE 4.5 L V8	D	230
11	LMP2	41	(United Kingdom) Greaves Motorsport	(Germany) Christian Zugel (Mexico) Roberto González (Ecuador) Elton Julian	Zytek Z11SN	D	229
11	LMP2	41	(United Kingdom) Greaves Motorsport	(Germany) Christian Zugel (Mexico) Roberto González (Ecuador) Elton Julian	Nissan VK45DE 4.5 L V8	D	229
12	LMP2	25	(United Kingdom) ADR-Delta	(Australia) John Martin (Thailand) Tor Graves (Czech Republic) Jan Charouz	Oreca 03	D	228
12	LMP2	25	(United Kingdom) ADR-Delta	(Australia) John Martin (Thailand) Tor Graves (Czech Republic) Jan Charouz	Nissan VK45DE 4.5 L V8	D	228
13	LMP2	32	(Germany) Lotus	(United States) Kevin Weeda (Italy) Vitantonio Liuzzi (United Kingdom) James Rossiter	Lola B12/80	D	228
13	LMP2	32	(Germany) Lotus	(United States) Kevin Weeda (Italy) Vitantonio Liuzzi (United Kingdom) James Rossiter	Lotus 3.6 L V8	D	228
14	LMP2	26	(France) Signatech-Nissan	(France) Pierre Ragues (France) Nelson Panciatici (Russia) Roman Rusinov	Oreca 03	D	227
14	LMP2	26	(France) Signatech-Nissan	(France) Pierre Ragues (France) Nelson Panciatici (Russia) Roman Rusinov	Nissan VK45DE 4.5 L V8	D	227
15	LMP2	31	(Germany) Lotus	(Germany) Thomas Holzer (Germany) Mirco Schultis (Italy) Luca Moro	Lola B12/80	D	226
15	LMP2	31	(Germany) Lotus	(Germany) Thomas Holzer (Germany) Mirco Schultis (Italy) Luca Moro	Lotus 3.6 L V8	D	226
16	**LMGTE; Pro**	**51**	**(Italy) AF Corse**	**(Italy) Giancarlo Fisichella (Italy) Gianmaria Bruni**	**Ferrari 458 Italia GT2**	MI	**221**
16	**LMGTE; Pro**	**51**	**(Italy) AF Corse**	**(Italy) Giancarlo Fisichella (Italy) Gianmaria Bruni**	**Ferrari F136 4.5 L V8**	MI	**221**
17	LMGTE; Pro	97	(United Kingdom) Aston Martin Racing	(Germany) Stefan Mücke (United Kingdom) Darren Turner	Aston Martin Vantage GTE	MI	220
17	LMGTE; Pro	97	(United Kingdom) Aston Martin Racing	(Germany) Stefan Mücke (United Kingdom) Darren Turner	Aston Martin AM05 4.5 L V8	MI	220
18	LMGTE; Pro	77	(Germany) Team Felbermayr-Proton	(Germany) Marc Lieb (Austria) Richard Lietz	Porsche 997 GT3-RSR	MI	220
18	LMGTE; Pro	77	(Germany) Team Felbermayr-Proton	(Germany) Marc Lieb (Austria) Richard Lietz	Porsche M97/74 4.0 L Flat-6	MI	220
19	LMGTE; Pro	71	(Italy) AF Corse	(Italy) Andrea Bertolini (Monaco) Olivier Beretta	Ferrari 458 Italia GT2	MI	219
19	LMGTE; Pro	71	(Italy) AF Corse	(Italy) Andrea Bertolini (Monaco) Olivier Beretta	Ferrari F136 4.5 L V8	MI	219
20	**LMGTE; Am**	**88**	**(Germany) Team Felbermayr-Proton**	**(Germany) Christian Ried (Italy) Gianluca Roda (Italy) Paolo Ruberti**	**Porsche 997 GT3-RSR**	MI	**213**
20	**LMGTE; Am**	**88**	**(Germany) Team Felbermayr-Proton**	**(Germany) Christian Ried (Italy) Gianluca Roda (Italy) Paolo Ruberti**	**Porsche M97/74 4.0 L Flat-6**	MI	**213**
21	LMGTE; Am	70	(France) Larbre Compétition	(France) Pascal Gibon (France) Christophe Bourret (France) Jean-Philippe Belloc	Chevrolet Corvette C6.R	MI	211
21	LMGTE; Am	70	(France) Larbre Compétition	(France) Pascal Gibon (France) Christophe Bourret (France) Jean-Philippe Belloc	Chevrolet LS5.5R 5.5 L V8	MI	211
22	LMGTE; Am	61	(Italy) AF Corse-Waltrip	(Brazil) Francisco Longo (Brazil) Xandy Negrão (Brazil) Enrique Bernoldi	Ferrari 458 Italia GT2	MI	210
22	LMGTE; Am	61	(Italy) AF Corse-Waltrip	(Brazil) Francisco Longo (Brazil) Xandy Negrão (Brazil) Enrique Bernoldi	Ferrari F136 4.5 L V8	MI	210
23	LMGTE; Am	55	(United Kingdom) JWA-Avila	(United Kingdom) Paul Daniels (Switzerland) Joël Camathias (Finland) Markus Palttala	Porsche 997 GT3-RSR	P	195
23	LMGTE; Am	55	(United Kingdom) JWA-Avila	(United Kingdom) Paul Daniels (Switzerland) Joël Camathias (Finland) Markus Palttala	Porsche M97/74 4.0 L Flat-6	P	195
24	LMP2	29	(United Arab Emirates) Gulf Racing Middle East	(France) Fabien Giroix (Japan) Keiko Ihara (Switzerland) Jean-Denis Délétraz	Lola B12/80	D	194
24	LMP2	29	(United Arab Emirates) Gulf Racing Middle East	(France) Fabien Giroix (Japan) Keiko Ihara (Switzerland) Jean-Denis Délétraz	Nissan VK45DE 4.5 L V8	D	194
DNF	LMP2	35	(France) OAK Racing	(Belgium) Bertrand Baguette (Austria) Dominik Kraihamer (United Kingdom) Alex Brundle	Morgan LMP2	D	164
DNF	LMP2	35	(France) OAK Racing	(Belgium) Bertrand Baguette (Austria) Dominik Kraihamer (United Kingdom) Alex Brundle	Nissan VK45DE 4.5 L V8	D	164
DNF	LMP2	23	(France) Signatech-Nissan	(France) Franck Mailleux (France) Jordan Tresson (France) Olivier Lombard	Oreca 03	D	96
DNF	LMP2	23	(France) Signatech-Nissan	(France) Franck Mailleux (France) Jordan Tresson (France) Olivier Lombard	Nissan VK45DE 4.5 L V8	D	96
DNF	LMGTE; Am	57	(United States) Krohn Racing	(United States) Tracy Krohn (Sweden) Niclas Jönsson (Italy) Michele Rugolo	Ferrari 458 Italia GT2	MI	1
DNF	LMGTE; Am	57	(United States) Krohn Racing	(United States) Tracy Krohn (Sweden) Niclas Jönsson (Italy) Michele Rugolo	Ferrari F136 4.5 L V8	MI	1
EX	LMGTE; Am	50	(France) Larbre Compétition	(France) Patrick Bornhauser (France) Julien Canal (Brazil) Fernando Rees	Chevrolet Corvette C6.R	MI	216
EX	LMGTE; Am	50	(France) Larbre Compétition	(France) Patrick Bornhauser (France) Julien Canal (Brazil) Fernando Rees	Chevrolet LS5.5R 5.5 L V8	MI	216

Tyre manufacturers
Key
Symbol	Tyre manufacturer
**D**	Dunlop
**MI**	Michelin
**P**	Pirelli

Note: After finishing 1st in LMGTE Am class, the No. 50 Larbre Corvette was excluded following the post-race technical checks. The team has appealed the Stewards' Decision.

FIA World Endurance Championship
Previous race: 6 Hours of Silverstone	2012 season	Next race: 6 Hours of Bahrain
