= 2012 6 Hours of Fuji =

Sports car endurance race held at Fuji Speedway, Oyama, Japan

Fuji Speedway

The 2012 6 Hours of Fuji was an endurance auto race held at the Fuji Speedway in Oyama, Shizuoka, Japan on 14 October 2012. The race is the seventh round of the 2012 FIA World Endurance Championship season, and marks the return of the former Fuji 1000 km event for the first time since 2007.

== Qualifying ==
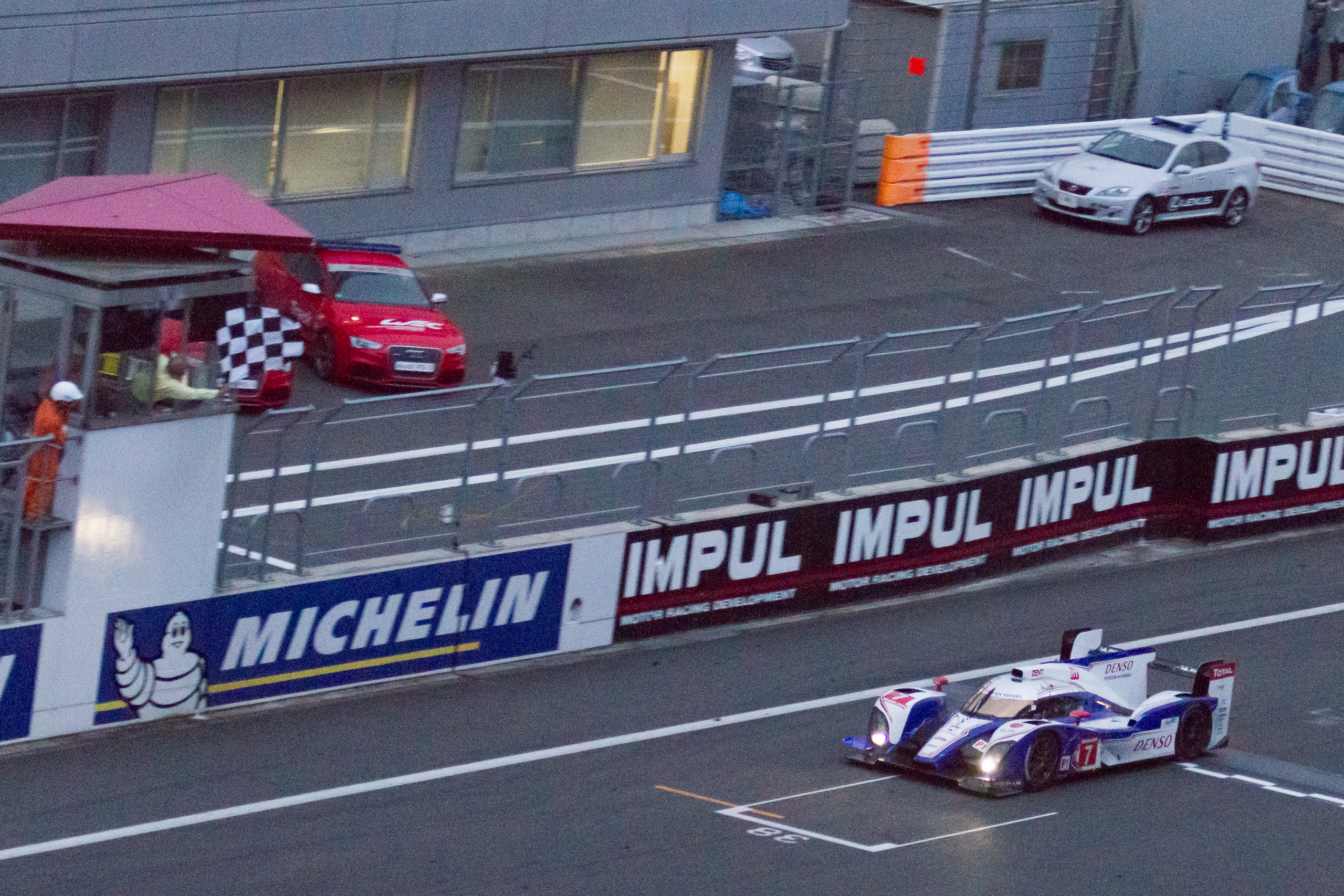
Kazuki Nakajima took the win for Toyota in front of the Japanese crowd.

Toyota earned their second pole position of the season in front of the home crowd at the circuit also owned by the company. Kazuki Nakajima set a lap time of 1:27.499 in the Toyota TS030 Hybrid, nearly two tenths of a second ahead of Marcel Fässler's Audi. Neel Jani gave Rebellion Racing the top spot amongst the LMP1 privateers to put another Toyota motor on the second row of the starting grid, just ahead of Strakka Racing's Honda. Starworks Motorsport continued their streak of four consecutive pole positions in the LMP2 category, with a 1:32.367 lap set by Stéphane Sarrazin in the team's Honda, with the ADR-Delta Oreca-Nissan second in the category.

In LMGTE Pro, Marc Lieb gave Porsche their second pole of the season with Team Felbermayr-Proton, three tenths of a second ahead of Gianmaria Bruni's AF Corse Ferrari. The LMGTE Am category was led by Jean-Philippe Belloc who earned Larbre Compétition their first pole of the year in the Chevrolet Corvette.

=== Qualifying result ===
Pole position winners in each class are marked in bold.

Pos	Class	Team	Driver	Lap Time	Grid
1	**LMP1**	**No. 7 Toyota Racing**	**Kazuki Nakajima**	**1:27.499**	**1**
2	LMP1	No. 1 Audi Sport Team Joest	Marcel Fässler	1:27.639	2
3	LMP1	No. 2 Audi Sport Team Joest	Tom Kristensen	1:28.370	3
4	LMP1	No. 12 Rebellion Racing	Neel Jani	1:29.871	4
5	LMP1	No. 21 Strakka Racing	Danny Watts	1:30.051	5
6	LMP1	No. 22 JRM	David Brabham	1:30.410	6
7	LMP1	No. 13 Rebellion Racing	Andrea Belicchi	1:30.682	7
8	LMP1	No. 15 OAK Racing	Bertrand Baguette	1:30.912	8
9	**LMP2**	**No. 44 Starworks Motorsport**	**Stéphane Sarrazin**	**1:32.367**	**9**
10	LMP2	No. 25 ADR-Delta	John Martin	1:32.548	10
11	LMP2	No. 32 Lotus	Vitantonio Liuzzi	1:32.738	11
12	LMP2	No. 26 Signatech-Nissan	Nelson Panciatici	1:32.960	12
13	LMP2	No. 49 Pecom Racing	Nicolas Minassian	1:33.114	13
14	LMP2	No. 24 OAK Racing	Olivier Pla	1:33.165	14
15	LMP2	No. 23 Signatech-Nissan	Olivier Lombard	1:34.294	15
16	LMP2	No. 31 Lotus	Thomas Holzer	1:35.036	16
17	LMP2	No. 29 Gulf Racing Middle East	Fabien Giroix	1:35.234	17
18	LMP2	No. 41 Greaves Motorsport	Ricardo González	1:35.601	18
19	**LMGTE Pro**	**No. 77 Team Felbermayr-Proton**	**Marc Lieb**	**1:40.289**	**19**
20	LMGTE Pro	No. 51 AF Corse	Gianmaria Bruni	1:40.598	20
21	LMGTE Pro	No. 97 Aston Martin Racing	Stefan Mücke	1:40.798	24^{1}
22	LMGTE Pro	No. 71 AF Corse	Andrea Bertolini	1:41.202	21
23	**LMGTE Am**	**No. 70 Larbre Compétition**	**Jean-Philippe Belloc**	**1:41.386**	**22**
24	LMGTE Am	No. 57 Krohn Racing	Michele Rugolo	1:41.701	23
25	LMGTE Am	No. 88 Team Felbermayr-Proton	Paolo Ruberti	1:41.711	25
26	LMGTE Am	No. 50 Larbre Compétition	Julien Canal	1:41.945	26^{1}
27	LMGTE Am	No. 55 JWA-Avila	Joël Camathias	1:42.910	27^{1}

- The No. 50 Larbre Corvette, No. 55 JWA-Avila Porsche, and No. 97 Aston Martin were all demoted three grid positions for cutting corners during the qualifying session.

== Race ==
=== Race result ===
Class winners in bold. Cars failing to complete 70% of winner's distance marked as Not Classified (NC).

Pos	Class	No	Team	Drivers	Chassis	Tyre	Laps
Pos	Class	No	Team	Drivers	Engine	Tyre	Laps
1	**LMP1**	**7**	**(Japan) Toyota Racing**	**(Austria) Alexander Wurz (France) Nicolas Lapierre (Japan) Kazuki Nakajima**	**Toyota TS030 Hybrid**	MI	**233**
1	**LMP1**	**7**	**(Japan) Toyota Racing**	**(Austria) Alexander Wurz (France) Nicolas Lapierre (Japan) Kazuki Nakajima**	**Toyota RV8KLM 3.4 L V8 (Hybrid)**	MI	**233**
2	LMP1	1	(Germany) Audi Sport Team Joest	(Germany) André Lotterer (Switzerland) Marcel Fässler (France) Benoît Tréluyer	Audi R18 e-tron quattro	MI	233
2	LMP1	1	(Germany) Audi Sport Team Joest	(Germany) André Lotterer (Switzerland) Marcel Fässler (France) Benoît Tréluyer	Audi TDI 3.7 L Turbo V6 (Hybrid Diesel)	MI	233
3	LMP1	2	(Germany) Audi Sport Team Joest	(United Kingdom) Allan McNish (Denmark) Tom Kristensen	Audi R18 e-tron quattro	MI	233
3	LMP1	2	(Germany) Audi Sport Team Joest	(United Kingdom) Allan McNish (Denmark) Tom Kristensen	Audi TDI 3.7 L Turbo V6 (Hybrid Diesel)	MI	233
4	LMP1	12	(Switzerland) Rebellion Racing	(France) Nicolas Prost (Switzerland) Neel Jani	Lola B12/60	MI	227
4	LMP1	12	(Switzerland) Rebellion Racing	(France) Nicolas Prost (Switzerland) Neel Jani	Toyota RV8KLM 3.4 L V8	MI	227
5	LMP1	22	(United Kingdom) JRM	(United Kingdom) Peter Dumbreck (Australia) David Brabham (India) Karun Chandhok	HPD ARX-03a	MI	226
5	LMP1	22	(United Kingdom) JRM	(United Kingdom) Peter Dumbreck (Australia) David Brabham (India) Karun Chandhok	Honda LM-V8 3.4 L V8	MI	226
6	LMP1	21	(United Kingdom) Strakka Racing	(United Kingdom) Nick Leventis (United Kingdom) Jonny Kane (United Kingdom) Danny Watts	HPD ARX-03a	MI	226
6	LMP1	21	(United Kingdom) Strakka Racing	(United Kingdom) Nick Leventis (United Kingdom) Jonny Kane (United Kingdom) Danny Watts	Honda LM-V8 3.4 L V8	MI	226
7	LMP1	13	(Switzerland) Rebellion Racing	(Italy) Andrea Belicchi (Switzerland) Harold Primat	Lola B12/60	MI	225
7	LMP1	13	(Switzerland) Rebellion Racing	(Italy) Andrea Belicchi (Switzerland) Harold Primat	Toyota RV8KLM 3.4 L V8	MI	225
8	**LMP2**	**25**	**(United Kingdom) ADR-Delta**	**(Australia) John Martin (Thailand) Tor Graves (Japan) Shinji Nakano**	**Oreca 03**	D	**220**
8	**LMP2**	**25**	**(United Kingdom) ADR-Delta**	**(Australia) John Martin (Thailand) Tor Graves (Japan) Shinji Nakano**	**Nissan VK45DE 4.5 L V8**	D	**220**
9	LMP2	44	(United States) Starworks Motorsport	(United Kingdom) Ryan Dalziel (Venezuela) Enzo Potolicchio (France) Stéphane Sarrazin	HPD ARX-03b	D	219
9	LMP2	44	(United States) Starworks Motorsport	(United Kingdom) Ryan Dalziel (Venezuela) Enzo Potolicchio (France) Stéphane Sarrazin	Honda HR28TT 2.8 L Turbo V6	D	219
10	LMP2	24	(France) OAK Racing	(France) Jacques Nicolet (France) Olivier Pla (France) Matthieu Lahaye	Morgan LMP2	D	219
10	LMP2	24	(France) OAK Racing	(France) Jacques Nicolet (France) Olivier Pla (France) Matthieu Lahaye	Nissan VK45DE 4.5 L V8	D	219
11	LMP2	49	(Argentina) Pecom Racing	(Argentina) Luís Pérez Companc (France) Nicolas Minassian (Germany) Pierre Kaffer	Oreca 03	D	216
11	LMP2	49	(Argentina) Pecom Racing	(Argentina) Luís Pérez Companc (France) Nicolas Minassian (Germany) Pierre Kaffer	Nissan VK45DE 4.5 L V8	D	216
12	LMP2	32	(Germany) Lotus	(United States) Kevin Weeda (Italy) Vitantonio Liuzzi (United Kingdom) James Rossiter	Lola B12/80	D	216
12	LMP2	32	(Germany) Lotus	(United States) Kevin Weeda (Italy) Vitantonio Liuzzi (United Kingdom) James Rossiter	Lotus 3.6 L V8	D	216
13	LMP2	29	(United Arab Emirates) Gulf Racing Middle East	(France) Fabien Giroix (Japan) Keiko Ihara (Switzerland) Jean-Denis Délétraz	Lola B12/80	D	214
13	LMP2	29	(United Arab Emirates) Gulf Racing Middle East	(France) Fabien Giroix (Japan) Keiko Ihara (Switzerland) Jean-Denis Délétraz	Nissan VK45DE 4.5 L V8	D	214
14	LMP2	41	(United Kingdom) Greaves Motorsport	(Germany) Christian Zugel (Mexico) Ricardo González (Ecuador) Elton Julian	Zytek Z11SN	D	212
14	LMP2	41	(United Kingdom) Greaves Motorsport	(Germany) Christian Zugel (Mexico) Ricardo González (Ecuador) Elton Julian	Nissan VK45DE 4.5 L V8	D	212
15	LMP2	23	(France) Signatech-Nissan	(France) Franck Mailleux (France) Jordan Tresson (France) Olivier Lombard	Oreca 03	D	211
15	LMP2	23	(France) Signatech-Nissan	(France) Franck Mailleux (France) Jordan Tresson (France) Olivier Lombard	Nissan VK45DE 4.5 L V8	D	211
16	LMP1	15	(France) OAK Racing	(Austria) Dominik Kraihamer (Belgium) Bertrand Baguette (Japan) Takuma Sato	OAK Pescarolo 01	D	210
16	LMP1	15	(France) OAK Racing	(Austria) Dominik Kraihamer (Belgium) Bertrand Baguette (Japan) Takuma Sato	Honda LM-V8 3.4 L V8	D	210
17	**LMGTE; Pro**	**77**	**(Germany) Team Felbermayr-Proton**	**(Germany) Marc Lieb (Austria) Richard Lietz**	**Porsche 997 GT3-RSR**	MI	**207**
17	**LMGTE; Pro**	**77**	**(Germany) Team Felbermayr-Proton**	**(Germany) Marc Lieb (Austria) Richard Lietz**	**Porsche M97/74 4.0 L Flat-6**	MI	**207**
18	LMGTE; Pro	51	(Italy) AF Corse	(Italy) Giancarlo Fisichella (Italy) Gianmaria Bruni	Ferrari 458 Italia GT2	MI	206
18	LMGTE; Pro	51	(Italy) AF Corse	(Italy) Giancarlo Fisichella (Italy) Gianmaria Bruni	Ferrari F136 4.5 L V8	MI	206
19	LMGTE; Pro	97	(United Kingdom) Aston Martin Racing	(Germany) Stefan Mücke (United Kingdom) Darren Turner	Aston Martin Vantage GTE	MI	206
19	LMGTE; Pro	97	(United Kingdom) Aston Martin Racing	(Germany) Stefan Mücke (United Kingdom) Darren Turner	Aston Martin AM05 4.5 L V8	MI	206
20	LMGTE; Pro	71	(Italy) AF Corse	(Italy) Andrea Bertolini (Monaco) Olivier Beretta	Ferrari 458 Italia GT2	MI	206
20	LMGTE; Pro	71	(Italy) AF Corse	(Italy) Andrea Bertolini (Monaco) Olivier Beretta	Ferrari F136 4.5 L V8	MI	206
21	**LMGTE; Am**	**50**	**(France) Larbre Compétition**	**(France) Patrick Bornhauser (France) Julien Canal (Portugal) Pedro Lamy**	**Chevrolet Corvette C6.R**	MI	**204**
21	**LMGTE; Am**	**50**	**(France) Larbre Compétition**	**(France) Patrick Bornhauser (France) Julien Canal (Portugal) Pedro Lamy**	**Corvette LS5.5R 5.5 L V8**	MI	**204**
22	LMGTE; Am	57	(United States) Krohn Racing	(United States) Tracy Krohn (Sweden) Niclas Jonsson (Italy) Michele Rugolo	Ferrari 458 Italia GT2	MI	203
22	LMGTE; Am	57	(United States) Krohn Racing	(United States) Tracy Krohn (Sweden) Niclas Jonsson (Italy) Michele Rugolo	Ferrari F136 4.5 L V8	MI	203
23	LMGTE; Am	88	(Germany) Team Felbermayr-Proton	(Germany) Christian Ried (Italy) Gianluca Roda (Italy) Paolo Ruberti	Porsche 997 GT3-RSR	MI	202
23	LMGTE; Am	88	(Germany) Team Felbermayr-Proton	(Germany) Christian Ried (Italy) Gianluca Roda (Italy) Paolo Ruberti	Porsche M97/74 4.0 L Flat-6	MI	202
24	LMGTE; Am	70	(France) Larbre Compétition	(France) Pascal Gibon (France) Christophe Bourret (France) Jean-Philippe Belloc	Chevrolet Corvette C6.R	MI	199
24	LMGTE; Am	70	(France) Larbre Compétition	(France) Pascal Gibon (France) Christophe Bourret (France) Jean-Philippe Belloc	Corvette LS5.5R 5.5 L V8	MI	199
25	LMGTE; Am	55	(United Kingdom) JWA-Avila	(United Kingdom) Paul Daniels (Switzerland) Joël Camathias (Japan) Kenji Kobayashi	Porsche 997 GT3-RSR	MI	196
25	LMGTE; Am	55	(United Kingdom) JWA-Avila	(United Kingdom) Paul Daniels (Switzerland) Joël Camathias (Japan) Kenji Kobayashi	Porsche M97/74 4.0 L Flat-6	MI	196
DNF	LMP2	31	(Germany) Lotus	(Germany) Thomas Holzer (Germany) Mirco Schultis	Lola B12/80	D	139
DNF	LMP2	31	(Germany) Lotus	(Germany) Thomas Holzer (Germany) Mirco Schultis	Lotus 3.6 L V8	D	139
EX	LMP2	26	(France) Signatech-Nissan	(France) Pierre Ragues (France) Nelson Panciatici (Russia) Roman Rusinov	Oreca 03	D	213
EX	LMP2	26	(France) Signatech-Nissan	(France) Pierre Ragues (France) Nelson Panciatici (Russia) Roman Rusinov	Nissan VK45DE 4.5 L V8	D	213

FIA World Endurance Championship
Previous race: 6 Hours of Bahrain	2012 season	Next race: 6 Hours of Shanghai
