= 2012 6 Hours of Shanghai =

Sports car endurance race held at Shanghai International Circuit

(China) 2012 6 Hours of Shanghai
Event Information
- Round 8 of 8 in the 2012 FIA World Endurance Championship
- Date: 28 October 2012 FIA World Endurance Championship
- Location: Shanghai, China
- Venue: Shanghai International Circuit

Results
Race 1
Distance	191 laps	km
Pole position	(Austria) Alexander Wurz; Toyota Racing	1:48.273
Winner	(Austria) Alexander Wurz (France) Nicolas Lapierre; Toyota Racing	6:01:29.292

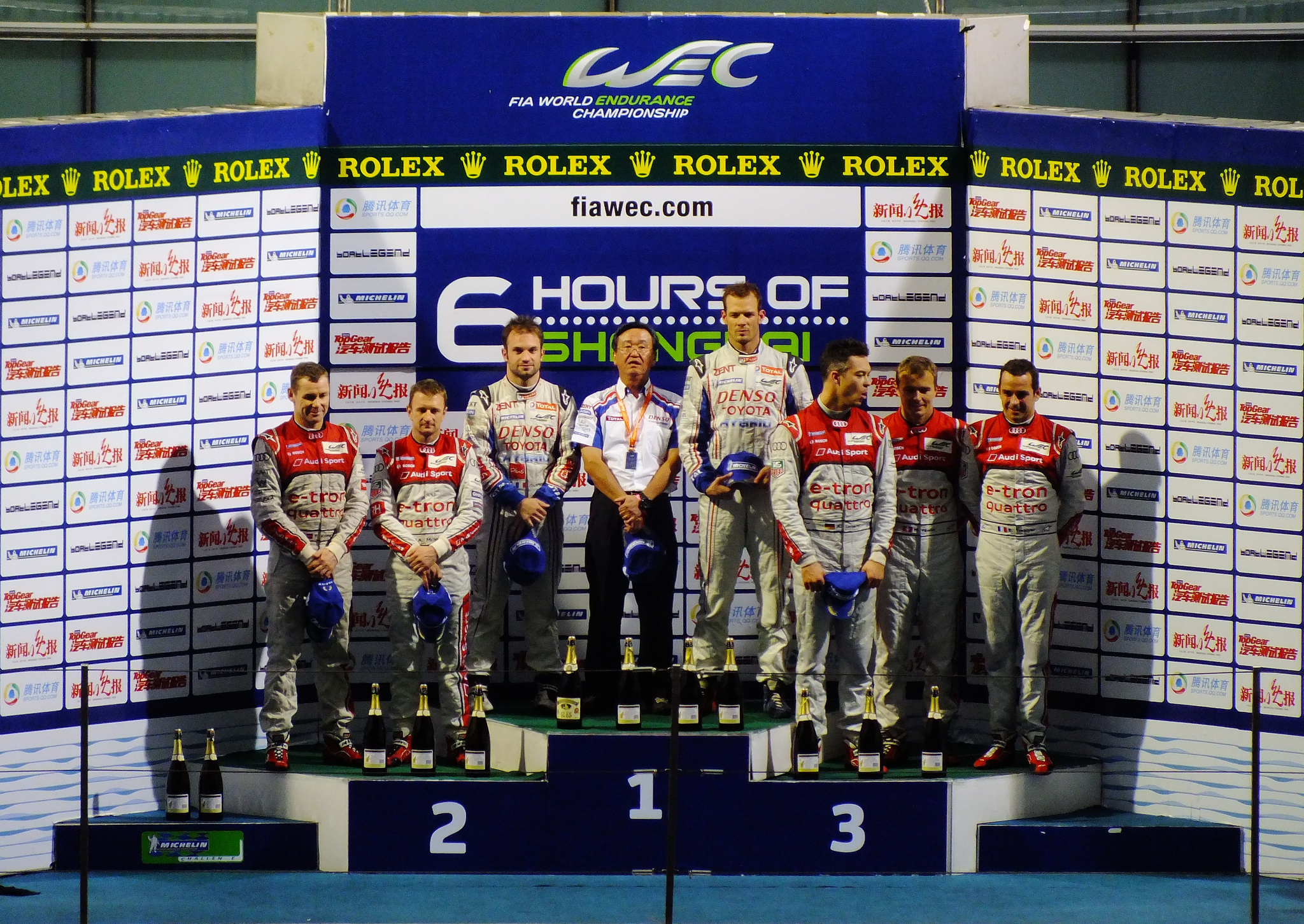
The podium for the overall race winners

The 2012 6 Hours of Shanghai was an endurance auto race held at the Shanghai International Circuit in Shanghai, China on 28 October 2012. The race was the eighth and season finale of the 2012 FIA World Endurance Championship season, and was the inaugural running of the 6 Hours of Shanghai.

The race was won by Alexander Wurz and Nicolas Lapierre driving the No.7 Toyota TS030 Hybrid of Toyota Racing. André Lotterer, Benoît Tréluyer and Marcel Fässler of Audi Sport Team Joest won the Drivers' World Championship at the event after finishing in third place. Larbre Compétition won the LMGTE Am Trophy following a class win.

== Qualifying ==
=== Qualifying result ===
Pole position winners in each class are marked in bold.

Pos	Class	Team	Driver	Lap Time	Grid
**1**	**LMP1**	**#7 Toyota Racing**	**Alexander Wurz**	**1:48.273**	**1**
2	LMP1	#2 Audi Sport Team Joest	Allan McNish	1:48.373	2
3	LMP1	#1 Audi Sport Team Joest	André Lotterer	1:48.597	3
4	LMP1	#22 JRM	Karun Chandhok	1:51.003	4
5	LMP1	#12 Rebellion Racing	Neel Jani	1:51.019	5
6	LMP1	#21 Strakka Racing	Danny Watts	1:51.037	6
7	LMP1	#13 Rebellion Racing	Andrea Belicchi	1:51.394	7
8	LMP1	#15 OAK Racing	Bertrand Baguette	1:52.172	8
**9**	**LMP2**	**#32 Lotus**	**James Rossiter**	**1:54.132**	**9**
10	LMP2	#25 ADR-Delta	John Martin	1:54.301	10
11	LMP2	#44 Starworks Motorsport	Stéphane Sarrazin	1:54.350	11
12	LMP2	#24 OAK Racing	Olivier Pla	1:54.475	12
13	LMP2	#49 Pecom Racing	Pierre Kaffer	1:55.151	13
14	LMP2	#31 Lotus	Thomas Holzer	1:55.195	14
15	LMP2	#23 Signatech-Nissan	Franck Mailleux	1:55.687	15
16	LMP2	#41 Greaves Motorsport	Elton Julian	1:56.531	16
17	LMP2	#26 Signatech-Nissan	Pierre Ragues	1:56.682	17
18	LMP2	#29 Gulf Racing Middle East	Fabien Giroix	1:57.370	18
**19**	**LMGTE Pro**	**#97 Aston Martin Racing**	**Darren Turner**	**2:03.721**	**19**
20	LMGTE Pro	#77 Team Felbermayr-Proton	Richard Lietz	2:04.471	20
21	LMGTE Pro	#51 AF Corse	Giancarlo Fisichella	2:05.387	21
**22**	**LMGTE Am**	**#88 Team Felbermayr-Proton**	**Paolo Ruberti**	**2:05.584**	**22**
23	LMGTE Am	#61 AF Corse-Waltrip	Marco Cioci	2:05.836	23
24	LMGTE Pro	#71 AF Corse	Olivier Beretta	2:06.367	24
25	LMGTE Am	#50 Larbre Compétition	Julien Canal	2:06.910	25
26	LMGTE Am	#55 JWA-Avila	Joël Camathias	2:08.848	26
27	LMGTE Am	#70 Larbre Compétition	Pascal Gibon	2:09.155	27
28	LMGTE Am	#57 Krohn Racing	Tracy Krohn	2:09.641	28

== Race ==
=== Race result ===
Class winners in bold. Cars failing to complete 70% of winner's distance marked as Not Classified (NC).

Pos	Class	No	Team	Drivers	Chassis	Tyre	Laps
Pos	Class	No	Team	Drivers	Engine	Tyre	Laps
1	**LMP1**	**7**	**(Japan) Toyota Racing**	**(Austria) Alexander Wurz (France) Nicolas Lapierre**	**Toyota TS030 Hybrid**	MI	**191**
1	**LMP1**	**7**	**(Japan) Toyota Racing**	**(Austria) Alexander Wurz (France) Nicolas Lapierre**	**Toyota RV8KLM 3.4 L V8 (Hybrid)**	MI	**191**
2	LMP1	2	(Germany) Audi Sport Team Joest	(United Kingdom) Allan McNish (Denmark) Tom Kristensen	Audi R18 e-tron quattro	MI	191
2	LMP1	2	(Germany) Audi Sport Team Joest	(United Kingdom) Allan McNish (Denmark) Tom Kristensen	Audi TDI 3.7 L Turbo V6 (Hybrid Diesel)	MI	191
3	LMP1	1	(Germany) Audi Sport Team Joest	(France) Benoît Tréluyer (Switzerland) Marcel Fässler (Germany) André Lotterer	Audi R18 e-tron quattro	MI	191
3	LMP1	1	(Germany) Audi Sport Team Joest	(France) Benoît Tréluyer (Switzerland) Marcel Fässler (Germany) André Lotterer	Audi TDI 3.7 L Turbo V6 (Hybrid Diesel)	MI	191
4	LMP1	13	(Switzerland) Rebellion Racing	(Switzerland) Harold Primat (Italy) Andrea Belicchi (China) Congfu Cheng	Lola B12/60	MI	185
4	LMP1	13	(Switzerland) Rebellion Racing	(Switzerland) Harold Primat (Italy) Andrea Belicchi (China) Congfu Cheng	Toyota RV8KLM 3.4 L V8	MI	185
5	LMP1	22	(United Kingdom) JRM	(United Kingdom) Peter Dumbreck (India) Karun Chandhok (Australia) David Brabham	HPD ARX-03a	MI	185
5	LMP1	22	(United Kingdom) JRM	(United Kingdom) Peter Dumbreck (India) Karun Chandhok (Australia) David Brabham	Honda LM-V8 3.4 L V8	MI	185
6	LMP1	21	(United Kingdom) Strakka Racing	(United Kingdom) Jonny Kane (United Kingdom) Danny Watts (United Kingdom) Nick Leventis	HPD ARX-03a	MI	182
6	LMP1	21	(United Kingdom) Strakka Racing	(United Kingdom) Jonny Kane (United Kingdom) Danny Watts (United Kingdom) Nick Leventis	Honda LM-V8 3.4 L V8	MI	182
7	**LMP2**	**25**	**(United Kingdom) ADR-Delta**	**(Thailand) Tor Graves (Australia) John Martin (Switzerland) Mathias Beche**	**Oreca 03**	D	**180**
7	**LMP2**	**25**	**(United Kingdom) ADR-Delta**	**(Thailand) Tor Graves (Australia) John Martin (Switzerland) Mathias Beche**	**Nissan VK45DE 4.5 L V8**	D	**180**
8	LMP2	44	(United States) Starworks Motorsport	(France) Stéphane Sarrazin (United Kingdom) Ryan Dalziel (Venezuela) Enzo Potolicchio	HPD ARX-03b	D	180
8	LMP2	44	(United States) Starworks Motorsport	(France) Stéphane Sarrazin (United Kingdom) Ryan Dalziel (Venezuela) Enzo Potolicchio	Honda HR28TT 2.8 L Turbo V6	D	180
9	LMP2	24	(France) OAK Racing	(France) Olivier Pla (France) Matthieu Lahaye (France) Jacques Nicolet	Morgan LMP2	D	179
9	LMP2	24	(France) OAK Racing	(France) Olivier Pla (France) Matthieu Lahaye (France) Jacques Nicolet	Nissan VK45DE 4.5 L V8	D	179
10	LMP2	49	(Argentina) Pecom Racing	(Germany) Pierre Kaffer (France) Nicolas Minassian (Argentina) Luís Pérez Companc	Oreca 03	D	179
10	LMP2	49	(Argentina) Pecom Racing	(Germany) Pierre Kaffer (France) Nicolas Minassian (Argentina) Luís Pérez Companc	Nissan VK45DE 4.5 L V8	D	179
11	LMP2	23	(France) Signatech-Nissan	(France) Jordan Tresson (France) Olivier Lombard (France) Franck Mailleux	Oreca 03	D	178
11	LMP2	23	(France) Signatech-Nissan	(France) Jordan Tresson (France) Olivier Lombard (France) Franck Mailleux	Nissan VK45DE 4.5 L V8	D	178
12	LMP2	31	(Germany) Lotus	(Germany) Mirco Schultis (Germany) Thomas Holzer	Lola B12/80	D	177
12	LMP2	31	(Germany) Lotus	(Germany) Mirco Schultis (Germany) Thomas Holzer	Lotus 3.6 L V8	D	177
13	LMP2	26	(France) Signatech-Nissan	(France) Pierre Ragues (Russia) Roman Rusinov (France) Nelson Panciatici	Oreca 03	D	177
13	LMP2	26	(France) Signatech-Nissan	(France) Pierre Ragues (Russia) Roman Rusinov (France) Nelson Panciatici	Nissan VK45DE 4.5 L V8	D	177
14	LMP1	15	(France) OAK Racing	(Austria) Dominik Kraihamer (Belgium) Bertrand Baguette (Japan) Takuma Sato	OAK Pescarolo 01	D	174
14	LMP1	15	(France) OAK Racing	(Austria) Dominik Kraihamer (Belgium) Bertrand Baguette (Japan) Takuma Sato	Honda LM-V8 3.4 L V8	D	174
15	LMP2	41	(United Kingdom) Greaves Motorsport	(Ecuador) Elton Julian (Mexico) Ricardo González (Germany) Christian Zugel	Zytek Z11SN	D	171
15	LMP2	41	(United Kingdom) Greaves Motorsport	(Ecuador) Elton Julian (Mexico) Ricardo González (Germany) Christian Zugel	Nissan VK45DE 4.5 L V8	D	171
16	**LMGTE; Pro**	**97**	**(United Kingdom) Aston Martin Racing**	**(United Kingdom) Darren Turner (Germany) Stefan Mücke**	**Aston Martin Vantage GTE**	MI	**169**
16	**LMGTE; Pro**	**97**	**(United Kingdom) Aston Martin Racing**	**(United Kingdom) Darren Turner (Germany) Stefan Mücke**	**Aston Martin AM05 4.5 L V8**	MI	**169**
17	LMGTE; Pro	77	(Germany) Team Felbermayr-Proton	(Austria) Richard Lietz (Germany) Marc Lieb	Porsche 997 GT3-RSR	MI	169
17	LMGTE; Pro	77	(Germany) Team Felbermayr-Proton	(Austria) Richard Lietz (Germany) Marc Lieb	Porsche M97/74 4.0 L Flat-6	MI	169
18	LMGTE; Pro	71	(Italy) AF Corse	(Monaco) Olivier Beretta (Italy) Andrea Bertolini	Ferrari 458 Italia GT2	MI	168
18	LMGTE; Pro	71	(Italy) AF Corse	(Monaco) Olivier Beretta (Italy) Andrea Bertolini	Ferrari F136 4.5 L V8	MI	168
19	**LMGTE; Am**	**50**	**(France) Larbre Compétition**	**(France) Patrick Bornhauser (France) Julien Canal (Portugal) Pedro Lamy**	**Chevrolet Corvette C6.R**	MI	**166**
19	**LMGTE; Am**	**50**	**(France) Larbre Compétition**	**(France) Patrick Bornhauser (France) Julien Canal (Portugal) Pedro Lamy**	**Chevrolet LS5.5R 5.5 L V8**	MI	**166**
20	LMGTE; Am	88	(Germany) Team Felbermayr-Proton	(Germany) Christian Ried (Italy) Gianluca Roda (Italy) Paolo Ruberti	Porsche 997 GT3-RSR	MI	165
20	LMGTE; Am	88	(Germany) Team Felbermayr-Proton	(Germany) Christian Ried (Italy) Gianluca Roda (Italy) Paolo Ruberti	Porsche M97/74 4.0 L Flat-6	MI	165
21	LMGTE; Am	57	(United States) Krohn Racing	(United States) Tracy Krohn (Sweden) Niclas Jönsson (Italy) Michele Rugolo	Ferrari 458 Italia GT2	MI	164
21	LMGTE; Am	57	(United States) Krohn Racing	(United States) Tracy Krohn (Sweden) Niclas Jönsson (Italy) Michele Rugolo	Ferrari F136 4.5 L V8	MI	164
22	LMGTE; Am	61	(Italy) AF Corse-Waltrip	(United States) Robert Kauffman (Italy) Marco Cioci (Portugal) Rui Águas	Ferrari 458 Italia GT2	MI	164
22	LMGTE; Am	61	(Italy) AF Corse-Waltrip	(United States) Robert Kauffman (Italy) Marco Cioci (Portugal) Rui Águas	Ferrari F136 4.5 L V8	MI	164
23	LMGTE; Am	70	(France) Larbre Compétition	(France) Jean-Philippe Belloc (France) Christophe Bourret (France) Pascal Gibon	Chevrolet Corvette C6.R	MI	163
23	LMGTE; Am	70	(France) Larbre Compétition	(France) Jean-Philippe Belloc (France) Christophe Bourret (France) Pascal Gibon	Chevrolet LS5.5R 5.5 L V8	MI	163
24	LMGTE; Am	55	(United Kingdom) JWA-Avila	(Switzerland) Joël Camathias (United Kingdom) Matt Bell (United Kingdom) Paul Daniels	Porsche 997 GT3-RSR	P	152
24	LMGTE; Am	55	(United Kingdom) JWA-Avila	(Switzerland) Joël Camathias (United Kingdom) Matt Bell (United Kingdom) Paul Daniels	Porsche M97/74 4.0 L Flat-6	P	152
DNF	LMP1	12	(Switzerland) Rebellion Racing	(France) Nicolas Prost (Switzerland) Neel Jani	Lola B12/60	MI	180
DNF	LMP1	12	(Switzerland) Rebellion Racing	(France) Nicolas Prost (Switzerland) Neel Jani	Toyota RV8KLM 3.4 L V8	MI	180
DNF	LMGTE; Pro	51	(Italy) AF Corse	(Italy) Gianmaria Bruni (Italy) Giancarlo Fisichella	Ferrari 458 Italia GT2	MI	144
DNF	LMGTE; Pro	51	(Italy) AF Corse	(Italy) Gianmaria Bruni (Italy) Giancarlo Fisichella	Ferrari F136 4.5 L V8	MI	144
DNF	LMP2	29	(United Arab Emirates) Gulf Racing Middle East	(Switzerland) Jean-Denis Délétraz (Japan) Keiko Ihara (France) Fabien Giroix	Lola B12/80	D	93
DNF	LMP2	29	(United Arab Emirates) Gulf Racing Middle East	(Switzerland) Jean-Denis Délétraz (Japan) Keiko Ihara (France) Fabien Giroix	Nissan VK45DE 4.5 L V8	D	93
DNF	LMP2	32	(Germany) Lotus	(United States) Kevin Weeda (United Kingdom) James Rossiter (Czech Republic) Jan Charouz	Lola B12/80	D	78
DNF	LMP2	32	(Germany) Lotus	(United States) Kevin Weeda (United Kingdom) James Rossiter (Czech Republic) Jan Charouz	Lotus 3.6 L V8	D	78

FIA World Endurance Championship
Previous race: 6 Hours of Fuji	2012 season	Next race: None
