= Honda HR28TT engine =

Overview
- Manufacturer: Honda Performance Development
- Production: 2011–2014

Layout
- Configuration: V6, twin-turbocharged, 60° cylinder angle
- Displacement: 2.8 L (2,799 cc)
- Cylinder bore: 89 mm (3.50 in)
- Piston stroke: 75 mm (2.95 in)
- Cylinder block material: Aluminium
- Cylinder head material: Aluminium
- Valvetrain: 24-valve (four-valves per cylinder), SOHC

Combustion
- Fuel system: Gasoline direct injection
- Fuel type: IMSA: VP MS100 E10, 100-octane gasoline + 10% ethanol WEC: Elf LM24 E10, 101-octane gasoline + 10% ethanol
- Oil system: Dry sump
- Cooling system: mechanically water cooled

Output
- Power output: 450 hp (336 kW; 456 PS)–500 hp (373 kW; 507 PS)
- Torque output: 519 N⋅m (383 lb⋅ft)–550 N⋅m (406 lb⋅ft)

Dimensions
- Dry weight: 170 kg (375 lb)

Chronology
- Predecessor: HPD LM-V8
- Successor: Honda HR35TT

The Honda HR28TT engine is a twin-turbocharged, four-stroke, 2.8-liter, V6 racing engine, designed and produced by Honda Performance Development (HPD) for use in multiple Le Mans Prototype race cars, from 2011 to 2014.

== Overview ==
The HR28TT was introduced in 2011, following the new cost-capped regulations for the LMP2 class. It is derived from the production J35 family of engines found numerous Honda/Acura production vehicles, using 400 production engine parts, including the engine block and heads, crankshaft, direct-injection fuel system, valve train components, drive-by-wire hardware. The engine also has turbo fresh air valve system, which eliminates turbo lag and provides improved reliability and performance.

== Applications ==
- HPD ARX-01d
- HPD ARX-01g
- HPD ARX-03b
- HPD ARX-04b
- Ligier JS P2
- Lola B11/40
- Lola B11/80
