= Paolo Ruberti =

Italian racing driver

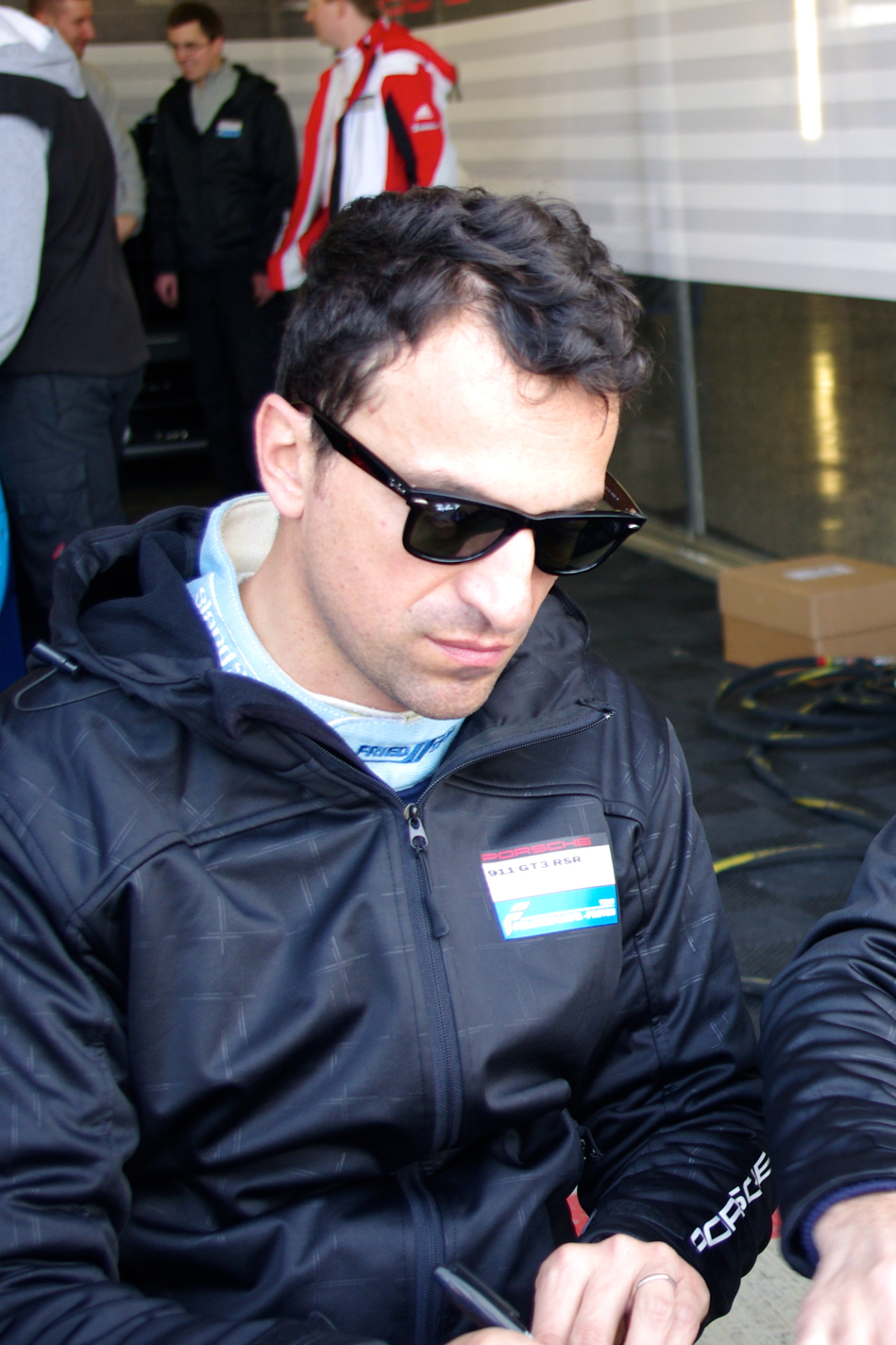
- Ruberti in 2013
- Nationality: (Italy) Italian
- Born: 22 April 1975 (age 51) Legnago, Italy

Michelin Le Mans Cup career
- Debut season: 2020
- Current team: Kessel Racing
- Categorisation: FIA Gold
- Car number: 67

Previous series
- 2012–2019 2014–2017: FIA World Endurance Championship; WeatherTech SportsCar Championship

Paolo Ruberti (born 22 April 1975) is an Italian racing driver who currently competes in the Michelin Le Mans Cup.

== Career ==
Ruberti began his career with karting in his native Italy, before moving on to national-level formula series. In 2008, he competed in his first 24 Hours of Le Mans, driving for BMS Scuderia Italia in the GT2 class. While testing at the Hockenheimring in 2016, Ruberti suffered a fractured lumbar vertebrae in an accident and missed the 2016 24 Hours of Le Mans, where he was due to drive for Larbre Compétition. Ruberti's first race back from his injury was a second-place finish in class at the 2016 6 Hours of Nürburgring. In 2017, Ruberti founded his own racing team in conjunction with Manfredi Ravetto, known as Scuderia Ravetto & Ruberti.

Prior to the 2019 6 Hours of Spa, Ruberti joined the ByKolles LMP1 team for the final two races of the World Endurance Championship season. In 2019, Ruberti also competed in the Lamborghini Super Trofeo North America for the first time, securing his first victory at VIR in August.

During the 2022 24 Hours of Le Mans, Ruberti served as a spotter for the Iron Lynx team. After two years away from professional racing competition, Ruberti returned to take part in the 2024 International GT Open with Pellin Racing, pairing with American driver Thor Haugen.

== Racing record ==
=== Complete American Le Mans Series results ===
(key) (Races in bold indicate pole position)

Year	Team	Class	Make	Engine	1	2	3	4	5	6	7	8	9	10	Rank	Points
2006	Konrad Motorsport	GT1	Saleen S7-R	Ford 7.0L V8	SEB; 6	HOU; 5	MDO	LIM	MIL	POR	ELK	MOS	PET	LGA	NC	0
2012	Team Felbermayr-Proton	LMGTE AM	Porsche 997 GT3-RSR	Porsche 4.0L Flat-6	SEB; 1	LBH	LGA	LIM	MOS	MDO	ELK	BAL	VIR	PET	NC	0

=== Complete WeatherTech SportsCar Championship results ===
(key) (Races in bold indicate pole position)

Year	Team	Class	Make	Engine	1	2	3	4	5	6	7	8	9	10	11	12	Rank	Points
2014	Spirit of Race	GTD	Ferrari 458 Italia GT3	Ferrari 4.5L V8	DAY; 18	SEB; 14	LGA	DET	WGL	MOS	IND	ELK	VIR	COA	COA		57th	34
2016	Dream Racing	GTD	Lamborghini Huracán GT3	Lamborghini 5.2L V10	DAY	SEB; 19	LGA	BEL	WGL	MOS	LIM	ELK	VIR	AUS; 11	PET; 6		29th	48
2017	Dream Racing Motorsport	GTD	Lamborghini Huracán GT3	Lamborghini 5.2L V10	DAY; 19	SEB; 19	LBH	AUS	BEL	WGL; 11	MOS	LIM	ELK	VIR	LGA	PET	48th	44

=== Complete 24 Hours of Le Mans results ===
Year	Team	Co-Drivers	Car	Class	Laps	Pos.	Class Pos.
2008	(Italy) BMS Scuderia Italia	(Italy) Matteo Malucelli (Italy) Fabio Babini	Ferrari F430 GT2	GT2	318	22nd	**2nd**
2009	(Italy) BMS Scuderia Italia	(Italy) Matteo Malucelli (Italy) Fabio Babini	Ferrari F430 GT2	GT2	327	19th	**2nd**
2012	(Germany) Team Felbermayr-Proton	(Italy) Gianluca Roda (Germany) Christian Ried	Porsche 997 GT3-RSR	GTE; Am	222	DNF	DNF
2013	(Germany) Proton Competition	(Italy) Gianluca Roda (Germany) Christian Ried	Porsche 911 GT3-RSR	GTE; Am	300	35th	8th
2014	(United States) 8 Star Motorsports	(Italy) Gianluca Roda (United States) Frankie Montecalvo	Ferrari 458 Italia GT2	GTE; Am	330	23rd	4th
2015	(France) Larbre Compétition	(Italy) Gianluca Roda (Denmark) Kristian Poulsen	Chevrolet Corvette C7.R	GTE; Am	94	DNF	DNF
2019	(Austria) ByKolles Racing	(France) Tom Dillmann (United Kingdom) Oliver Webb	ENSO CLM P1/01-Gibson	LMP1	163	DNF	DNF
2020	(Italy) Iron Lynx	(Italy) Sergio Pianezzola (Italy) Claudio Schiavoni	Ferrari 488 GTE Evo	GTE; Am	331	37th	11th
2021	(Italy) Iron Lynx	(Italy) Raffaele Giammaria (Italy) Claudio Schiavoni	Ferrari 488 GTE Evo	GTE; Am	335	30th	4th
