= 2012 6 Hours of Silverstone =

Sports car endurance race held at Silverstone Circuit, Northamptonshire, England

Map of the Silverstone Grand Prix Circuit

The 2012 6 Hours of Silverstone was a six-hour automobile endurance race for two or three driver teams in Le Mans Prototype (LMP) and Le Mans Grand Touring Endurance (LMGTE) cars held at the Silverstone Circuit, Silverstone, England on 26 August 2012. It was the fourth round in the 2012 FIA World Endurance Championship, featuring the Le Mans Prototype 1 (LMP1), Le Mans Prototype 2 (LMP2), Le Mans Grand Touring Endurance Professional (LMGTE Pro), and Le Mans Grand Touring Endurance Amateur (LMGTE Am) classes.

Marcel Fässler, André Lotterer and Benoît Tréluyer shared the pole position in a hybrid Audi R18 e-tron quattro after Tréluyer set the fastest overall lap in qualifying. Lotterer led the first ten laps until a Toyota TS030 Hybrid shared by Nicolas Lapierre, Kazuki Nakajima and Alexander Wurz passed him for the race lead on lap 11. Fässler, Lotterer and Tréluyer led the final 54 laps to win outright and move into the lead of the World Endurance Drivers' Championship and secure the LMP1 Manufacturers' World Championship for Audi. Lapierre, Nakajima and Wurz finished 55.675 seconds behind in second and the sister Audi R18 e-tron quattro of Tom Kristensen and Allan McNish took third.

The LMP2 category was won by ADR-Delta's Oreca 03-Nissan vehicle of Jan Charouz, Tor Graves and John Martin, who was 5.653 seconds ahead of the second-placed Starworks Motorsport team of Ryan Dalziel, Enzo Potolicchio and Stéphane Sarrazin sharing a HPD ARX-03b-Honda, reducing their Endurance Trophy For LMP2 Teams lead to 12 points. The Signatech-Nissan team of Nelson Panciatici, Pierre Ragues and Roman Rusinov were third in the category. Ferrari won the LMGTE Pro category with a Ferrari 458 Italia GT2 shared by Gianmaria Bruni and Giancarlo Fisichella of AF Corse leading the JMW Motorsport pair of Jonny Cocker and James Walker by two laps to further increase AF Corse's Endurance Trophy For LMGTE Pro Teams advantage over Aston Martin Racing. AF Corse-Waltrip's Ferrari of Marco Cioci, Matt Griffin and Piergiuseppe Perazzini beat out the Team Felbermayr-Proton Porsche 997 GT3-RSR shared by Christian Ried, Gianluca Roda, Paolo Ruberti to win the LMGTE Am category and went from fourth to third in the Endurance Trophy For LMGTE Am Teams.

== Background ==
The 2012 6 Hours of Silverstone was confirmed as part of the FIA World Endurance Championship (WEC) season at the FIA World Motor Sport Council meeting in New Delhi on 7 December 2011. It was the fourth of eight scheduled rounds of the 2012 FIA World Endurance Championship, the race's debut appearance in the series, and it was the last European round of the season, coming two months after the 24 Hours of Le Mans. The event took place at the 18-turn 5.891 km (3.660 mi) Silverstone Circuit in Silverstone, Northamptonshire, United Kingdom on 26 August 2012, and the facility held its first world championship endurance race since the 1992 500 km of Silverstone.

Before the race, Audi Sport Team Joest drivers Rinaldo Capello, Tom Kristensen and Allan McNish led the World Endurance Drivers' Championship with 77 points, six-and-a-half ahead of their teammates Marcel Fässler, André Lotterer, Benoît Tréluyer. Audi were unopposed in the LMP1 Manufacturers' World Championship with 103 points with Toyota having scored no points. With 154 points, Ferrari led Porsche and Chevrolet Corvette in the LMGTE Manufacturers' World Cup by 78 points. Rebellion Racing led JRM in the Endurance Trophy for LMP1 Teams by 24 points. A gap of 18 points separated Starworks Motorsport and ADR-Delta in the Endurance Trophy For LMP2 Teams while there was an 39-point gap between AF Corse and Luxury Racing in the Endurance Trophy For LMGTE Pro Teams. Larbre Compétition led Krohn Racing by 30 points in the Endurance Trophy For LMGTE Am Teams.

== Entries ==
A total of 35 vehicles divided into the Le Mans Prototype 1 (LMP1), Le Mans Prototype 2 (LMP2), Le Mans Grand Touring Endurance Professional (LMGTE Pro), and Le Mans Grand Touring Endurance Amateur (LMGTE Am) classes were officially entered for the race. There were 22 Le Mans Prototype (LMP) cars and 13 Le Mans Grand Touring Endurance (LMGTE) cars competing. There were seven cars in the LMP1 class. Audi fielded a hybridised R18 e-tron Quattro and a diesel-powered R18 ultra while Toyota entered a single TS030 Hybrid that featured a revised aerodynamic package to improve downforce for the rest of the season. Rebellion Racing sent two Lola B12/60-Toyota cars to Silverstone and a HPD ARX-03 was fielded by both JRM and Strakka Racing. OAK Racing withdrew from the LMP1 class due to continued reliability concerns with the engine in their OAK Pescarolo-Judd entry that had affected the car since the beginning of the season. Roald Goethe wished to not invest any more money into the Pescarolo 03 car project, forcing Pescarolo Team to withdraw from the race.

LMP2 had 15 cars from five manufacturers. Oreca was the most represented manufacturer in the category with five 03 cars; two fielded by Signatech Nissan and one each from ADR-Delta, PeCom Racing and Murphy Prototypes. Lola had four Lola B12/80 vehicles with two entered by Lotus and one each by Gulf Racing Middle East and Status Grand Prix. With their withdrawal from the LMP1 category, OAK Racing decided to focus on the LMP2 class, entering two Morgan LMP2-Nissan entries for the race. Zytek was represented by three Zytek Z11SN-Nissan cars, with two entered by Greaves Motorsport and one by Jota. The only HPD ARX-03b-Honda was fielded by Starworks Motorsport. Gulf Team Middle East withdrew one of their Nissan-powered Lola cars due to injuries sustained by drivers Stefan Johansson and Fabien Giroix, leaving the squad with a solitary entry.

The LMGTE field included 13 vehicles from four different car brands. The LMGTE Pro category again had five cars entered. Ferrari had the most cars in the category, with three 458 Italias, two of which were run by AF Corse and one by JMW Motorsport. Luxury Racing withdrew their two Ferrari 458 Italias from the race due to funding issues dating back to the 24 Hours of Le Mans after the team lost one of its primary shareholders that was due to provide funding for the season's final five races. The sole Porsche 997 GT3-RSR was fielded by Team Felbermayr-Proton and the only Aston Martin Vantage GTE was entered by Aston Martin Racing. The LMGTE Am class included eight vehicles for Silverstone. Larbre Compétition were the only Chevrolet team, fielding two Chevrolet Corvette C6.Rs. Ferrari had two 458 Italias in the category with one from Krohn Racing and a second by AF-Corse-Waltrip as AF Corse resumed their partnership with Michael Waltrip Racing at the event. Porsche were represented by two 997 GT3-RSRs with one each by JWA-Avila and Team Felbermayr-Proton while Aston Martin Racing represented the manufacturer with two Vantage V8s.

== Regulation and balance of performance changes ==
The Fédération Internationale de l'Automobile (FIA) specified the four braking zones where the hybrid LMP1 cars were permitted to recover energy generated under braking. The braking zones were designated at Village corner, Brooklands turn and Club corner sequence. The Automobile Club de l'Ouest (ACO) and FIA imposed a maximum of 500 kJ (120,000 cal) energy that could be recovered between two braking zones.

The FIA Endurance Committee approved a series of balance of performance adjustments to the 2012-spec LMGTE Pro class Porsche 911 GT3 RSR. The car was allowed to be driven with the front splitter being 75 mm (3.0 in) larger, the rear wing 100 mm (3.9 in) further back, the air restrictor being 0.7 mm (0.028 in) larger and the car was 10 kg (22 lb) lighter for better performance.

== Practice ==
The first two 90-minute practice sessions took place on 24 August and the third one-hour session was held the following day. The first practice session took place in sunshine until clouds covered the circuit and the air temperature decreased by the session's conclusion. Tréluyer set the fastest lap time in the No. 1 Audi R18 e-tron quattro at 1:45.777, 0.233 seconds faster than Nicolas Lapierre's No. 7 Toyota TS030 Hybrid. McNish's No. 2 R18 ultra was third-fastest. Dominik Kraihamer led LMP2 with a time of 1:51.561 set aboard the No. 35 OAK Morgan-Nissan, lapping two-thousands of a second faster quicker than the second-placed No. 42 Greaves entry of Alex Brundle. Matthieu Lahaye's sister No. 24 OAK vehicle was third in the category. Gianmaria Bruni's No. 51 AF Corse Ferrari led the LMGTE Pro class with a 2:02.757 lap, with his teammate Andrea Bertolini aboard the sister No. 52 Ferrari going second quickest late in the session. AF Corse led the LMGTE Am time sheets with a 2:04.080 lap set by Matt Griffin's No. 61 AF Corse-Waltrip car. No major incidents occurred during the session.

The second practice session held later in the afternoon took place in overcast weather conditions with some drizzle. Kristensen set the day's fastest lap time in the No. 2 Audi with a 1:45.645 set in the closing ten minutes. Tréluyer's No. 1 Audi was second and Danny Watts's No. 21 Strakka HPD car took third after a late lap. McNish and Pascal Gibon's No. 70 LMGTE Am-class Larbre Corvette collided at Brooklands corner. Three different manufacturers had the first three places in the LMP2 category. Nicolas Minassian set the pace in the class with a lap time of 1:50.759 on his first quick run aboard the No. 38 Jota Zytek car. He was 0.442 seconds quicker than Kraihamer's No. 35 OAK car in second and third was Pierre Kaffer's PeCom Racing Oreca entry. AF Corse continued to lead the LMGTE Pro category with Giancarlo Fisichella's lap time of 2:02.121 being 0.067 seconds faster than Team Felbermayr-Proton's No. 77 Porsche of Richard Lietz. The No. 61 AF Corse-Waltrip Ferrari continued to pace LMGTE Am with a lap of 2:02.918 set by Marco Cioci.

The final practice session took place on the morning with some parts of the track wet following overnight rain and under dark skies that were lifting to reveal sunlight. Numerous cars ran off the circuit as only the racing line became dry after a period of sunshine. McNish lapped fastest with a quickest time of the weekend thus far at 1:43.628 set 46 minutes into the session. Tréluyer set the second fastest lap late in the session with Lapierre third. As the session ended, Lapierre sustained damage to the No. 7 Toyota's right-rear wheelarch following a collision between himself and Olivier Beretta's No. 71 Ferrari. The LMP2 lead changed multiple times during the session, but Brundle was quickest with a lap of 1:49.524, the only sub 1:50 lap in the class. He was more than a second faster than the second-placed No. 35 Morgan car of Bertrand Baguette with Franck Mailleux's No. 23 Signatech Oreca car third. Bruni's No. 51 Ferrari set the weekend's first sub-2:02 time in a GT vehicle with a 2:01.937 lap set late in the session to lead the LMGTE Pro category, ahead of James Walker's No. 66 JMW Ferrari. Aston Martin had the two fastest times in LMGTE Am with Jonny Adam's No. 99 car setting a lap time of 2:02.920 that was two-tenths of a second faster than Stuart Hall's sister No. 98 entry.

== Qualifying ==
Saturday afternoon's qualifying session was split into two 20-minute groups. The first session was for all LMGTE cars, while the second was for all LMP entries. The team with the quickest lap time in each of the four categories won one championship point for themselves and their drivers. Between the conclusion of free practice and qualifying, persistent heavy rain fell on the circuit but qualifying was not delayed and began on time. The track quickly dried in the warm ambient temperatures but not fully during the two sessions. Teams switched tyres from wet to dry compounds. The fastest lap time was exchanged multiple times on the drying circuit. Tréluyer qualified the No. 1 Audi on pole position with a lap time of 1:43.663 on his final lap of qualifying with 45 seconds remaining. McNish in the No. 2 Audi joined his teammate Tréluyer on the front row and held pole position until Tréluyer's best time. Both the Audi drivers made pit stops for slick tyres during the closing five minutes and were able to improve their lap times. Lapierre put the No. 7 Toyota on provisional pole with nine minutes to go but fell to third despite improving on his final timed lap. The fastest LMP1 privateer team was Watts's No. 21 Strakka car in fourth. Watts spun at the final corner, a damp section of track, at the start of qualifying. Neel Jani's No. 12 Rebellion entry was second early in qualifying before dropping to fifth.

The LMP2 category saw the lead change multiple times during qualifying, and the first ten cars were within a second of each other. Brundle set a lap time of 1:49.964 on his last quick lap in the No. 42 Greaves car to claim the class pole position for the first time in his career. He spun into the gravel trap earlier in qualifying, damaging the car's rear legality panel. Stéphane Sarrazin was 0.033 seconds slower aboard the No. 44 Starwords vehicle but the team received the one point for pole position since the No. 42 Greaves team were not a full-time WEC entry. Despite a spin, John Martin qualified the ADR-Delta car in third after being impeded by slower cars on his last quick lap. Minassian was on provisional pole position with seven minutes remaining but dropped to fourth within the final minutes. The top five in class was completed by Brendon Hartley's No. 48 Murphy entry. The LMGTE classes saw lap times decrease fast on the drying track. Lietz was the only driver to go below 2:10 and took the LMGTE Pro pole position in the No. 77 Proton Porsche with a 2:09.564 lap after crossing the start/finish line a few seconds before qualifying ended, allowing him to set a last quick lap while others were doing their final lap. It was Porsche's first LMGTE Pro pole position of the season. Walker put the No. 66 Ferrari second and held pole position until Lietz's car; Walker spun under braking at the end of the Wellington Straight on his final lap while attempting to go faster. He did not damage the Ferrari. Bruni completed the top three in class driving the No. 51 AF Ferrari. Hall's No. 98 Aston Martin was the fastest in LMGTE Am, and the fourth fastest amongst all LMGTE entrants with a category pole lap time of 2:12.525. Paolo Ruberti's No. 88 Proton Porsche and Cioci's No. 61 Ferrari were second and third in class.

=== Qualifying result ===
Pole position winners in each class are marked in bold.

Final qualifying classification
Pos	Class	No.	Team	Driver	Lap	Gap	Grid
1	**LMP1**	**1**	**(Germany) Audi Sport Team Joest**	**Benoît Tréluyer**	**1:43.663**	—	**1**
2	LMP1	2	(Germany) Audi Sport Team Joest	Allan McNish	1:43.673	+0.010	2
3	LMP1	7	(Japan) Toyota Racing	Nicolas Lapierre	1:44.411	+0.748	3
4	LMP1	21	(United Kingdom) Strakka Racing	Danny Watts	1:46.160	+2.497	4
5	LMP1	12	(Switzerland) Rebellion Racing	Neel Jani	1:46.207	+2.544	5
6	LMP1	13	(Switzerland) Rebellion Racing	Andrea Belicchi	1:46.234	+2.571	6
7	LMP1	22	(United Kingdom) JRM	Karun Chandhok	1:46.758	+3.095	7
8	**LMP2**	**42**	**(United Kingdom) Greaves Motorsport**	**Alex Brundle**	**1:49.964**	**+6.301**	**8**
9	LMP2	44	(United States) Starworks Motorsport	Stéphane Sarrazin	1:49.997	+6.334	9
10	LMP2	25	(United Kingdom) ADR-Delta	John Martin	1:50.129	+6.466	10
11	LMP2	38	(United Kingdom) Jota	Nicolas Minassian	1:50.165	+6.502	11
12	LMP2	48	(Republic of Ireland) Murphy Prototypes	Brendon Hartley	1:50.250	+6.587	12
13	LMP2	23	(France) Signatech-Nissan	Franck Mailleux	1:50.624	+6.961	13
14	LMP2	32	(Germany) Lotus	James Rossiter	1:50.688	+7.025	PL (Note: The No. 32 Lotus Lola started from the pit lane following an engine change.)
15	LMP2	49	(Argentina) PeCom Racing	Pierre Kaffer	1:50.775	+7.112	14
16	LMP2	35	(France) OAK Racing	Bertrand Baguette	1:50.851	+7.188	15
17	LMP2	30	(Republic of Ireland) Status GP	Alexander Sims	1:50.919	+7.256	16
18	LMP2	41	(United Kingdom) Greaves Motorsport	Elton Julian	1:50.993	+7.330	17
19	LMP2	24	(France) OAK Racing	Matthieu Lahaye	1:51.283	+7.620	18
20	LMP2	26	(France) Signatech-Nissan	Pierre Ragues	1:51.942	+8.279	19
21	LMP2	31	(Germany) Lotus	Thomas Holzer	1:53.349	+9.686	20
22	LMP2	29	(United Arab Emirates) Gulf Racing Middle East	Fabien Giroix	1:54.476	+10.813	21
23	**LMGTE Pro**	**77**	**(Germany) Team Felbermayr-Proton**	**Richard Lietz**	**2:09.564**	**+25.901**	**22**
24	LMGTE Pro	66	(United Kingdom) JMW Motorsport	James Walker	2:10.018	+26.355	23
25	LMGTE Pro	51	(Italy) AF Corse	Gianmaria Bruni	2:10.481	+26.818	24
26	**LMGTE Am**	**98**	**(United Kingdom) Aston Martin Racing**	**Stuart Hall**	**2:12.525**	**+28.862**	**25**
27	LMGTE Am	88	(Germany) Team Felbermayr-Proton	Paolo Ruberti	2:12.965	+29.302	26
28	LMGTE Pro	97	(United Kingdom) Aston Martin Racing	Stefan Mücke	2:14.150	+30.487	27
29	LMGTE Pro	71	(Italy) AF Corse	Andrea Bertolini	2:15.153	+31.490	28
30	LMGTE Am	61	(Italy) AF Corse-Waltrip	Marco Cioci	2:15.491	+31.828	29
31	LMGTE Am	57	(United States) Krohn Racing	Michele Rugolo	2:15.608	+31.945	30
32	LMGTE Am	55	(United Kingdom) JWA-Avila	Joël Camathias	2:16.466	+32.803	33 (Note: The No. 55 JWA-Avila Porsche and No. 70 Larbre Compétition Chevrolet started from the back of the grid due to being granted a waiver for drivers Markus Palttala and Christophe Bourret, respectively, who were otherwise not allowed to race in the wet conditions.)
33	LMGTE Am	99	(United Kingdom) Aston Martin Racing	Jonny Adam	2:16.717	+33.054	31
34	LMGTE Am	50	(France) Larbre Compétition	Fernando Rees	2:16.907	+33.244	32
35	LMGTE Am	70	(France) Larbre Compétition	Jean-Philippe Belloc	2:17.261	+33.598	34

== Warm-up ==
A 20-minute warm-up session took place on the morning of the race. More overnight rain made the circuit damp, but the session took place in sunny weather conditions. The No. 7 Toyota of Alexander Wurz set the fastest time with a lap of 1:47.398 set on his second timed run, ahead of Lotterer's No. 1 Audi and the two Rebellion cars driven by Harold Primat and Nico Prost. The quickest LMP2 time was a 1:51.552 set by Olivier Pla's No. 24 OAK Nissan. Darren Turner, driving the No. 97 Aston Martin, was the quickest driver in LMGTE Pro with Ruberti's No. 88 Proton Porsche the fastest LMGTE Am driver. McNish beached the No. 2 Audi in the Abbey turn gravel trap on the car's first lap. The Audi was extricated from the gravel and McNish returned to the pit lane without major damage to the car. A collision between the Signatech LMP2 prototype entries resulted in the premature conclusion to warm-up.

== Race ==
Conditions at the start of the race were dry. The ambient temperature was between 16.8 to 19.5 °C (62.2 to 67.1 °F) and the track temperature was between 17.2 to 22.2 °C (63.0 to 72.0 °F). The race began before 35,000 spectators at 12:00 British Summer Time (UTC+01:00) with Olympic gold medal canoeists Tim Baillie and Etienne Stott waving the green flag to commence proceedings, led by starting pole sitter Lotterer. 35 cars planned to take the start but the No. 32 Lotus Lola car of James Rossiter was required to start from the pit lane and join after the completion of the first lap for an engine change after an failure during Friday free practice. At the start, Wurz used the No. 7 Toyota's hybrid power to pass Kristensen's No. 2 Audi for second overall heading towards turn one. In the LMP2 category, Brundle had to drive the No. 42 Graves entry onto the tarmac run-off area when Peter Dumbreck lost control of the LMP1 class No. 22 JRM car at turn one, promoting Sarrazin's Starworks car to the class lead and Minassian to second in class. Martin overtook Minassian for second in LMP2 ten minutes in. Wurz had closed up to Lotterer, who was baulked by the No. 29 Gulf LMP2 Lola car at the exit to Copse corner, allowing Wurz to pass Lotterer for the overall lead into the high speed Maggots turn on lap 11.

Wurz pulled away from Lotterer and was 11 seconds ahead when he began the first round of pit stops for tyres and some driver changes on lap 21, after which Lotterer lead the next four laps before his pit stop that led Kristensen to lead a lap. The LMGTE Pro lead became a two-car battle between Lietz's No. 77 Proton Porsche, Bruni's No. 51 Ferrari and Turner's No. 97 Aston Martin as the trio challenged each other for position. The Aston Martin was less fuel efficient than the Ferrari. Cioci in the No. 61 Ferrari had been lapping faster than Hall's No. 98 Aston Martin and took the LMGTE Am lead from him. Ruberti closed the gap between himself and Hall and took second place in LMGTE Am despite contact between the two vehicles resulting in damage to the No. 88 Proton Porsche's rear. Martin was seven seconds behind Sarrazin but closed up and took the LMP2 category lead in the second hour as Fernando Rees's No. 50 Larbre Corvette moved into the LMGTE Am class lead. Hartley's front-left wheel detached from the No. 48 Murphy car on the straight leading to Copse corner but he kept control of the car and returned to pit lane.

The No. 32 Lotus Lola car of Kevin Weeda pulled over to the side of the circuit on the Hangar Straight with an engine failure, a legacy of an earlier breakage in the exhaust manifold system that caused a fire in the engine wiring loom. The Lotus entry's retirement led to the deployment of the safety cars per WEC rules to allow for its recovery from the side of the track by marshals. When the safety cars were withdrawn, Ruberti had taken the lead of LMGTE Am in the No. 88 Proton Porsche. The safety cars allowed Tréluyer to close up to Kazuki Nakajima's No. 7 Toyota and he briefly passed Nakajima on the Hangar Straight going into Stowe corner. Nakajima reclaimed the race lead going into Club corner. Lietz brought the No. 77 Proton Porsche slowly to the garage with a collapsed right-rear suspension component through Abbey turn, dropping the Porsche to the rear of the GT field. This promoted Stefan Mücke in the No. 97 Aston Martin to the LMGTE Pro class lead, the same driver Lietz had been battling before his problem. Pla, having battled Minassian for second in LMP2 before a pit stop, had been the fastest driver in the category and moved the No. 24 OAK car to first position in class after a cycle of pit stops.

In the fourth hour, the No. 1 Audi was assessed a stop-and-go penalty by the stewards for an earlier collision with Tracy Krohn's No. 57 Krohn Ferrari that he was lapping caused by Tréluyer swerving to avoid a slower vehicle in front of him, resulting in Krohn spinning at Club corner. The ADR-Delta entry of Tor Graves returned to the LMP2 class lead following another cycle of pit stops while Fisichella's No. 51 AF Ferrari moved to the LMGTE Pro lead. The No. 22 JRM LMP1 car and the No. 71 AF Corse Ferrari collided but both cars continued. Maxime Jousse picked up a puncture and brought the No. 30 Status Lola car to the pit lane. Audi had a greater fuel economy than Toyota and fuel could be put into their cars faster, allowing the manufacturer to run longer stints and make one less pit stop than Toyota, whose high-downforce aerodynamic package resulted in higher fuel consumption. Fässler therefore was able to bring the No. 1 Audi past the No. 7 Toyota for the overall race lead by the conclusion of the fourth hour.

The No. 88 Proton Porsche continued to hold sway in LMGTE Am but the car relinquished the class lead it had held for 56 consecutive laps was driven into the pit lane for a routine stop, handing the class lead to Matt Griffin's No. 61 AF Corse-Waltrip Ferrari in the fifth hour. LMP2 became a battle for second in class with Ryan Dalziel's No. 44 Starworks entry closing up to the second-placed Jacques Nicolet's No. 24 OAK car. Later in the fifth hour, an accident prompted the safety car's second deployment for nine minutes. Jordan Tresson crashed the No. 23 Singatech car into the concrete wall at the entry to the Hangar Straight, sustaining enough damage to warrant the vehicle's retirement. The gap between the race-leading No. 1 Audi of Fässler and the No. 7 Toyota of Wurz increased by 40 seconds as they were both caught up behind separate safety cars. After the safety car's withdrawal, the two LMGTE categories saw battles for the podium positions while Sarrazin and Nelson Panciatici's No. 26 Signatech entry battled for second position in the LMP2 class.

In the final hour, Audi considered allowing Kristensen past Fässler but the Joest technical director Ralf Jüttner told Fässler he could not slow down because of the gap between the No. 1 Audi and the No. 7 Toyota and Audi believed Toyota had a seven second advantage over the leading Audi on refuelling rate during its preceding pit stop. The LMP2 category lead of Jan Charouz's No. 25 ADR-Delta car was more than a minute over the second-placed Sarrazin's No. 44 Starworks entry but Sarrazin began to close the gap. Mücke was set to secure second but he brought the No. 97 Aston Martin to the pit lane with damage to the front splitter, dropping to fourth. Following the pit stop, Mücke began to lap quickly, gaining on the third placed No. 52 AF Corse Ferrari of Bertolini despite running straight at turn nine. On the final lap, Mücke drew alongside Bertolini at Vale corner. At that point, the two cars collided, sending Bertolini into the gravel trap but Mücke continued with heavy damage to the No. 97 Aston Martin.

At the front, the No. 1 Audi of Lotterer maintained the race lead it had held for the final 54 laps to win the race by 55.675 seconds over Wurz's No. 7 Toyota to give the World Endurance Drivers' Championship lead to Fässler, Lotterer and Tréluyer by 4.5 points over their teammates Kristensen and McNish. The overall win also clinched the LMP1 Manufacturers' World Championship for Audi. The No. 2 Audi of Kristensen and McNish fell back in the second hour because of an unscheduled pit stop for a deflating right-rear tyre and completed the overall podium in third. Sarrazin continued to gain on Charouz, who held the LMP2 lead for the closing 20 laps to win the category by 5.653 seconds, and reduce Starworks's Endurance Trophy For LMP2 Teams lead to 12 points. The No. 26 Signatech entry completed the LMP2 podium to give the team their first WEC class podium, 18 seconds behind the class winners. AF Corse secured their second consecutive series victory, with the No. 51 Ferrari maintaining the category lead for the final 80 laps, further increasing their Endurance Trophy For LMGTE Pro Teams lead over Aston Martin Racing. They were two laps ahead of the second-placed JMW Ferrari and the No. 97 Aston Martin took third. The Italian manufacturer also won in LMGTE Am, with the No. 61 AF Corse-Waltrip team beating the No. 50 Larbre Corvette that had a quiet race and the No. 88 Proton Porsche, moving from fourth to third in the Endurance Trophy For LMGTE Am Teams.

=== Post-race ===
Following the race, the No. 50 Larbre Corvette was disqualified from the race results because of the non-conformity of a safety device when it was determined that the car's onboard fire extinguisher was out of date. This promoted the No. 88 Proton Porsche to second and the No. 57 Krohn Ferrari to third in LMGTE Am. Team principal Jack Leconte said it had accepted the stewards' findings and the team would modify their assembly procedures during the fitting of safety equipment.

=== Race result ===
The minimum number of laps for classification (70% of overall winning car's distance) was 135 laps. Class winners are in bold and ‡.

Final race classification
Pos	Class	No.	Team	Drivers	Chassis	Tyre	Laps	Time/Retired
Pos	Class	No.	Team	Drivers	Engine	Tyre	Laps	Time/Retired
1	**LMP1**	**1**	**(Germany) Audi Sport Team Joest**	**(Switzerland) Marcel Fässler (Germany) André Lotterer (France) Benoît Tréluyer**	**Audi R18 e-tron quattro**	M	**194**	**6:00:39.594‡**
1	**LMP1**	**1**	**(Germany) Audi Sport Team Joest**	**(Switzerland) Marcel Fässler (Germany) André Lotterer (France) Benoît Tréluyer**	**Audi TDI 3.7 L Turbo V6 (Hybrid Diesel)**	M	**194**	**6:00:39.594‡**
2	LMP1	7	(Japan) Toyota Racing	(France) Nicolas Lapierre (Japan) Kazuki Nakajima (Austria) Alexander Wurz	Toyota TS030 Hybrid	M	194	+55.675
2	LMP1	7	(Japan) Toyota Racing	(France) Nicolas Lapierre (Japan) Kazuki Nakajima (Austria) Alexander Wurz	Toyota RV8KLM 3.4 L V8 (Hybrid)	M	194	+55.675
3	LMP1	2	(Germany) Audi Sport Team Joest	(Denmark) Tom Kristensen (United Kingdom) Allan McNish	Audi R18 ultra	M	194	+1:14.427
3	LMP1	2	(Germany) Audi Sport Team Joest	(Denmark) Tom Kristensen (United Kingdom) Allan McNish	Audi TDI 3.7 L Turbo V6 (Diesel)	M	194	+1:14.427
4	LMP1	13	(Switzerland) Rebellion Racing	(Italy) Andrea Belicchi (Switzerland) Harold Primat	Lola B12/60	M	189	+5 Laps
4	LMP1	13	(Switzerland) Rebellion Racing	(Italy) Andrea Belicchi (Switzerland) Harold Primat	Toyota RV8KLM 3.4 L V8	M	189	+5 Laps
5	LMP1	21	(United Kingdom) Strakka Racing	(United Kingdom) Jonny Kane (United Kingdom) Nick Leventis (United Kingdom) Danny Watts	HPD ARX-03a	M	189	+5 Laps
5	LMP1	21	(United Kingdom) Strakka Racing	(United Kingdom) Jonny Kane (United Kingdom) Nick Leventis (United Kingdom) Danny Watts	Honda LM-V8 3.4 L V8	M	189	+5 Laps
6	LMP1	12	(Switzerland) Rebellion Racing	(Switzerland) Neel Jani (France) Nicolas Prost	Lola B12/60	M	189	+5 Laps
6	LMP1	12	(Switzerland) Rebellion Racing	(Switzerland) Neel Jani (France) Nicolas Prost	Toyota RV8KLM 3.4 L V8	M	189	+5 Laps
7	LMP1	22	(United Kingdom) JRM	(Australia) David Brabham (India) Karun Chandhok (United Kingdom) Peter Dumbreck	HPD ARX-03a	M	187	+7 Laps
7	LMP1	22	(United Kingdom) JRM	(Australia) David Brabham (India) Karun Chandhok (United Kingdom) Peter Dumbreck	Honda LM-V8 3.4 L V8	M	187	+7 Laps
8	**LMP2**	**25**	**(United Kingdom) ADR-Delta**	**(Czech Republic) Jan Charouz (Thailand) Tor Graves (Australia) John Martin**	**Oreca 03**	D	**183**	**+11 Laps‡**
8	**LMP2**	**25**	**(United Kingdom) ADR-Delta**	**(Czech Republic) Jan Charouz (Thailand) Tor Graves (Australia) John Martin**	**Nissan VK45DE 4.5 L V8**	D	**183**	**+11 Laps‡**
9	LMP2	44	(United States) Starworks Motorsport	(United Kingdom) Ryan Dalziel (Venezuela) Enzo Potolicchio (France) Stéphane Sarrazin	HPD ARX-03b	D	183	+11 Laps
9	LMP2	44	(United States) Starworks Motorsport	(United Kingdom) Ryan Dalziel (Venezuela) Enzo Potolicchio (France) Stéphane Sarrazin	Honda HR28TT 2.8 L Turbo V6	D	183	+11 Laps
10	LMP2	26	(France) Signatech-Nissan	(France) Nelson Panciatici (France) Pierre Ragues (Russia) Roman Rusinov	Oreca 03	D	183	+11 Laps
10	LMP2	26	(France) Signatech-Nissan	(France) Nelson Panciatici (France) Pierre Ragues (Russia) Roman Rusinov	Nissan VK45DE 4.5 L V8	D	183	+11 Laps
11	LMP2	49	(Argentina) PeCom Racing	(France) Soheil Ayari (Argentina) Luis Pérez Companc (Germany) Pierre Kaffer	Oreca 03	D	182	+12 Laps
11	LMP2	49	(Argentina) PeCom Racing	(France) Soheil Ayari (Argentina) Luis Pérez Companc (Germany) Pierre Kaffer	Nissan VK45DE 4.5 L V8	D	182	+12 Laps
12	LMP2	42	(United Kingdom) Greaves Motorsport	(United Kingdom) Alex Brundle (United Kingdom) Martin Brundle (Spain) Lucas Ordóñez	Zytek Z11SN	D	182	+12 Laps
12	LMP2	42	(United Kingdom) Greaves Motorsport	(United Kingdom) Alex Brundle (United Kingdom) Martin Brundle (Spain) Lucas Ordóñez	Nissan VK45DE 4.5 L V8	D	182	+12 Laps
13	LMP2	24	(France) OAK Racing	(France) Matthieu Lahaye (France) Jacques Nicolet (France) Olivier Pla	Morgan LMP2	D	182	+12 Laps
13	LMP2	24	(France) OAK Racing	(France) Matthieu Lahaye (France) Jacques Nicolet (France) Olivier Pla	Nissan VK45DE 4.5 L V8	D	182	+12 Laps
14	LMP2	38	(United Kingdom) Jota	(United Kingdom) Simon Dolan (United Kingdom) Sam Hancock (France) Nicolas Minassian	Zytek Z11SN	D	182	+12 Laps
14	LMP2	38	(United Kingdom) Jota	(United Kingdom) Simon Dolan (United Kingdom) Sam Hancock (France) Nicolas Minassian	Nissan VK45DE 4.5 L V8	D	182	+12 Laps
15	LMP2	30	(Republic of Ireland) Status GP	(France) Julien Jousse (France) Maxime Jousse (United Kingdom) Alexander Sims	Lola B12/80	D	181	+13 Laps
15	LMP2	30	(Republic of Ireland) Status GP	(France) Julien Jousse (France) Maxime Jousse (United Kingdom) Alexander Sims	Judd HK 3.6 L V8	D	181	+13 Laps
16	LMP2	48	(Republic of Ireland) Murphy Prototypes	(United Kingdom) Jody Firth (New Zealand) Brendon Hartley (United Kingdom) Warren Hughes	Oreca 03	D	180	+14 Laps
16	LMP2	48	(Republic of Ireland) Murphy Prototypes	(United Kingdom) Jody Firth (New Zealand) Brendon Hartley (United Kingdom) Warren Hughes	Nissan VK45DE 4.5 L V8	D	180	+14 Laps
17	LMP2	35	(France) OAK Racing	(Belgium) Bertrand Baguette (Denmark) David Heinemeier Hansson (Austria) Dominik Kraihamer	Morgan LMP2	D	176	+18 Laps
17	LMP2	35	(France) OAK Racing	(Belgium) Bertrand Baguette (Denmark) David Heinemeier Hansson (Austria) Dominik Kraihamer	Nissan VK45DE 4.5 L V8	D	176	+18 Laps
18	LMP2	29	(United Arab Emirates) Gulf Racing Middle East	(Switzerland) Jean-Denis Delétraz (France) Fabien Giroix (Japan) Keiko Ihara	Lola B12/80	D	176	+18 Laps
18	LMP2	29	(United Arab Emirates) Gulf Racing Middle East	(Switzerland) Jean-Denis Delétraz (France) Fabien Giroix (Japan) Keiko Ihara	Nissan VK45DE 4.5 L V8	D	176	+18 Laps
19	LMP2	31	(Germany) Lotus	(Netherlands) Christijan Albers (Germany) Thomas Holzer (Germany) Mirco Schultis	Lola B12/80	D	174	+20 Laps
19	LMP2	31	(Germany) Lotus	(Netherlands) Christijan Albers (Germany) Thomas Holzer (Germany) Mirco Schultis	Lotus 3.6 L V8	D	174	+20 Laps
20	LMP2	41	(United Kingdom) Greaves Motorsport	(Mexico) Ricardo González (Ecuador) Elton Julian (Germany) Christian Zugel	Zytek Z11SN	D	173	+21 Laps
20	LMP2	41	(United Kingdom) Greaves Motorsport	(Mexico) Ricardo González (Ecuador) Elton Julian (Germany) Christian Zugel	Nissan VK45DE 4.5 L V8	D	173	+21 Laps
21	**LMGTE Pro**	**51**	**(Italy) AF Corse**	**(Italy) Gianmaria Bruni (Italy) Giancarlo Fisichella**	**Ferrari 458 Italia GT2**	M	**171**	**+23 Laps‡**
21	**LMGTE Pro**	**51**	**(Italy) AF Corse**	**(Italy) Gianmaria Bruni (Italy) Giancarlo Fisichella**	**Ferrari F136 4.5 L V8**	M	**171**	**+23 Laps‡**
22	LMGTE Pro	66	(United Kingdom) JMW Motorsport	(United Kingdom) Jonny Cocker (United Kingdom) James Walker	Ferrari 458 Italia GT2	D	169	+25 Laps
22	LMGTE Pro	66	(United Kingdom) JMW Motorsport	(United Kingdom) Jonny Cocker (United Kingdom) James Walker	Ferrari F136 4.5 L V8	D	169	+25 Laps
23	LMGTE Pro	97	(United Kingdom) Aston Martin Racing	(Mexico) Adrián Fernández (Germany) Stefan Mücke (United Kingdom) Darren Turner	Aston Martin Vantage GTE	M	169	+25 Laps
23	LMGTE Pro	97	(United Kingdom) Aston Martin Racing	(Mexico) Adrián Fernández (Germany) Stefan Mücke (United Kingdom) Darren Turner	Aston Martin AM05 4.5 L V8	M	169	+25 Laps
24	**LMGTE Am**	**61**	**(Italy) AF Corse-Waltrip**	**(Italy) Marco Cioci (Republic of Ireland) Matt Griffin (Italy) Piergiuseppe Perazzini**	**Ferrari 458 Italia GT2**	M	**166**	**+28 Laps‡**
24	**LMGTE Am**	**61**	**(Italy) AF Corse-Waltrip**	**(Italy) Marco Cioci (Republic of Ireland) Matt Griffin (Italy) Piergiuseppe Perazzini**	**Ferrari F136 4.5 L V8**	M	**166**	**+28 Laps‡**
25	LMGTE Am	88	(Germany) Team Felbermayr-Proton	(Germany) Christian Ried (Italy) Gianluca Roda (Italy) Paolo Ruberti	Porsche 997 GT3-RSR	M	166	+28 Laps
25	LMGTE Am	88	(Germany) Team Felbermayr-Proton	(Germany) Christian Ried (Italy) Gianluca Roda (Italy) Paolo Ruberti	Porsche M97/74 4.0 L Flat-6	M	166	+28 Laps
26	LMGTE Am	57	(United States) Krohn Racing	(Sweden) Niclas Jönsson (United States) Tracy Krohn (Italy) Michele Rugolo	Ferrari 458 Italia GT2	M	165	+29 Laps
26	LMGTE Am	57	(United States) Krohn Racing	(Sweden) Niclas Jönsson (United States) Tracy Krohn (Italy) Michele Rugolo	Ferrari F136 4.5 L V8	M	165	+29 Laps
27	LMGTE Pro	77	(Germany) Team Felbermayr-Proton	(Germany) Marc Lieb (Austria) Richard Lietz	Porsche 997 GT3-RSR	M	164	+30 Laps
27	LMGTE Pro	77	(Germany) Team Felbermayr-Proton	(Germany) Marc Lieb (Austria) Richard Lietz	Porsche M97/74 4.0 L Flat-6	M	164	+30 Laps
28	LMGTE Am	98	(United Kingdom) Aston Martin Racing	(Germany) Roald Goethe (United Kingdom) Stuart Hall	Aston Martin Vantage GTE	M	163	+31 Laps
28	LMGTE Am	98	(United Kingdom) Aston Martin Racing	(Germany) Roald Goethe (United Kingdom) Stuart Hall	Aston Martin AM05 4.5 L V8	M	163	+31 Laps
29	LMGTE Am	70	(France) Larbre Compétition	(France) Jean-Philippe Belloc (France) Christophe Bourret (France) Pascal Gibon	Chevrolet Corvette C6.R	M	162	+32 Laps
29	LMGTE Am	70	(France) Larbre Compétition	(France) Jean-Philippe Belloc (France) Christophe Bourret (France) Pascal Gibon	Chevrolet LS5.5R 5.5 L V8	M	162	+32 Laps
30	LMGTE Am	55	(United Kingdom) JWA-Avila	(Switzerland) Joël Camathias (United Kingdom) Paul Daniels (Finland) Markus Palttala	Porsche 997 GT3-RSR	P	161	+33 Laps
30	LMGTE Am	55	(United Kingdom) JWA-Avila	(Switzerland) Joël Camathias (United Kingdom) Paul Daniels (Finland) Markus Palttala	Porsche M97/74 4.0 L Flat-6	P	161	+33 Laps
DNF	LMGTE Pro	71	(Italy) AF Corse	(Monaco) Olivier Beretta (Italy) Andrea Bertolini	Ferrari 458 Italia GT2	M	168	Accident
DNF	LMGTE Pro	71	(Italy) AF Corse	(Monaco) Olivier Beretta (Italy) Andrea Bertolini	Ferrari F136 4.5 L V8	M	168	Accident
DNF	LMGTE Am	99	(United Kingdom) Aston Martin Racing	(United Kingdom) Jonny Adam (United Kingdom) Andrew Howard (United Kingdom) Paul White	Aston Martin Vantage GTE	M	157	Engine
DNF	LMGTE Am	99	(United Kingdom) Aston Martin Racing	(United Kingdom) Jonny Adam (United Kingdom) Andrew Howard (United Kingdom) Paul White	Aston Martin AM05 4.5 L V8	M	157	Engine
DNF	LMP2	23	(France) Signatech-Nissan	(France) Olivier Lombard (France) Franck Mailleux (France) Jordan Tresson	Oreca 03	D	135	Accident
DNF	LMP2	23	(France) Signatech-Nissan	(France) Olivier Lombard (France) Franck Mailleux (France) Jordan Tresson	Nissan VK45DE 4.5 L V8	D	135	Accident
DNF	LMP2	32	(Germany) Lotus	(Italy) Vitantonio Liuzzi (United Kingdom) James Rossiter (United States) Kevin Weeda	Lola B12/80	D	26	Engine
DNF	LMP2	32	(Germany) Lotus	(Italy) Vitantonio Liuzzi (United Kingdom) James Rossiter (United States) Kevin Weeda	Lotus 3.6 L V8	D	26	Engine
EX	LMGTE Am	50	(France) Larbre Compétition	(France) Patrick Bornhauser (France) Julien Canal (Brazil) Fernando Rees	Chevrolet Corvette C6.R	M	166	Excluded (Note: The No. 50 Larbre Compétition Chevrolet Corvette C6.R was disqualified from the race after the car's onboard fire extinguisher was found to be out of date.)
EX	LMGTE Am	50	(France) Larbre Compétition	(France) Patrick Bornhauser (France) Julien Canal (Brazil) Fernando Rees	Chevrolet LS5.5R 5.5 L V8	M	166	Excluded

Tyre manufacturers
Key
Symbol	Tyre manufacturer
**D**	Dunlop
**M**	Michelin
**P**	Pirelli

== Championship standings after the race ==
World Drivers' Championship standings
Pos.	+/-	Driver	Points
1	1	(Switzerland) Marcel Fässler (Germany) André Lotterer (France) Benoît Tréluyer	96.5
2	1	(Denmark) Tom Kristensen (United Kingdom) Allan McNish	92 (−4.5)
3	2	(Italy) Rinaldo Capello	77 (−19.5)
4	1	(France) Romain Dumas (France) Loïc Duval	67 (−29.5)
5		(Switzerland) Neel Jani (France) Nicolas Prost	50.5 (−46)

LMP1 Manufacturers' World Championship standings
Pos.	+/-	Manufacturer	Points
1		(Germany) Audi	129
2		(Japan) Toyota	18 (–111)

LMGTE Manufacturers' World Cup standings
Pos.	+/-	Manufacturer	Points
1		(Italy) Ferrari	197
2		(Germany) Porsche	102 (–95)
3		(United States) Chevrolet	84 (–113)

Endurance Trophy for LMP1 Teams standings
Pos.	+/-	Team	Points
1		(Switzerland) Rebellion Racing	112
2	1	(United Kingdom) Strakka Racing	75 (–37)
3	1	(United Kingdom) JRM	75 (–37)
4		(France) Pescarolo Team	25 (–87)
5		(France) OAK Racing	8 (–104)

Endurance Trophy For LMP2 Teams standings
Pos.	+/-	Team	Points
1		(United States) Starworks Motorsport	98
2		(United Kingdom) ADR-Delta	86 (–12)
3		(Argentina) PeCom Racing	74 (–24)
4		(United Kingdom) Greaves Motorsport	63 (–35)
5		(France) OAK Racing	43 (–55)

Endurance Trophy For LMGTE Pro Teams standings
Pos.	+/-	Team	Points
1		(Italy) AF Corse	118
2	1	(United Kingdom) Aston Martin Racing	63 (–55)
3	1	(Germany) Team Felbermayr-Proton	59 (–59)
4	2	(France) Luxury Racing	53 (–65)

Endurance Trophy For LMGTE Am Teams standings
Pos.	+/-	Team	Points
1		(France) Larbre Compétition	98
2		(United States) Krohn Racing	71 (–27)
3		(Germany) Team Felbermayr-Proton	69 (–29)
4	1	(Italy) AF Corse-Waltrip	61 (–37)
5	1	(United Kingdom) JWA-Avila	50 (–48)

== Footnotes ==
FIA World Endurance Championship
Previous race: 24 Hours of Le Mans	2012 season	Next race: 6 Hours of São Paulo
