= Peter Hardman =

English racing driver (born 1964)

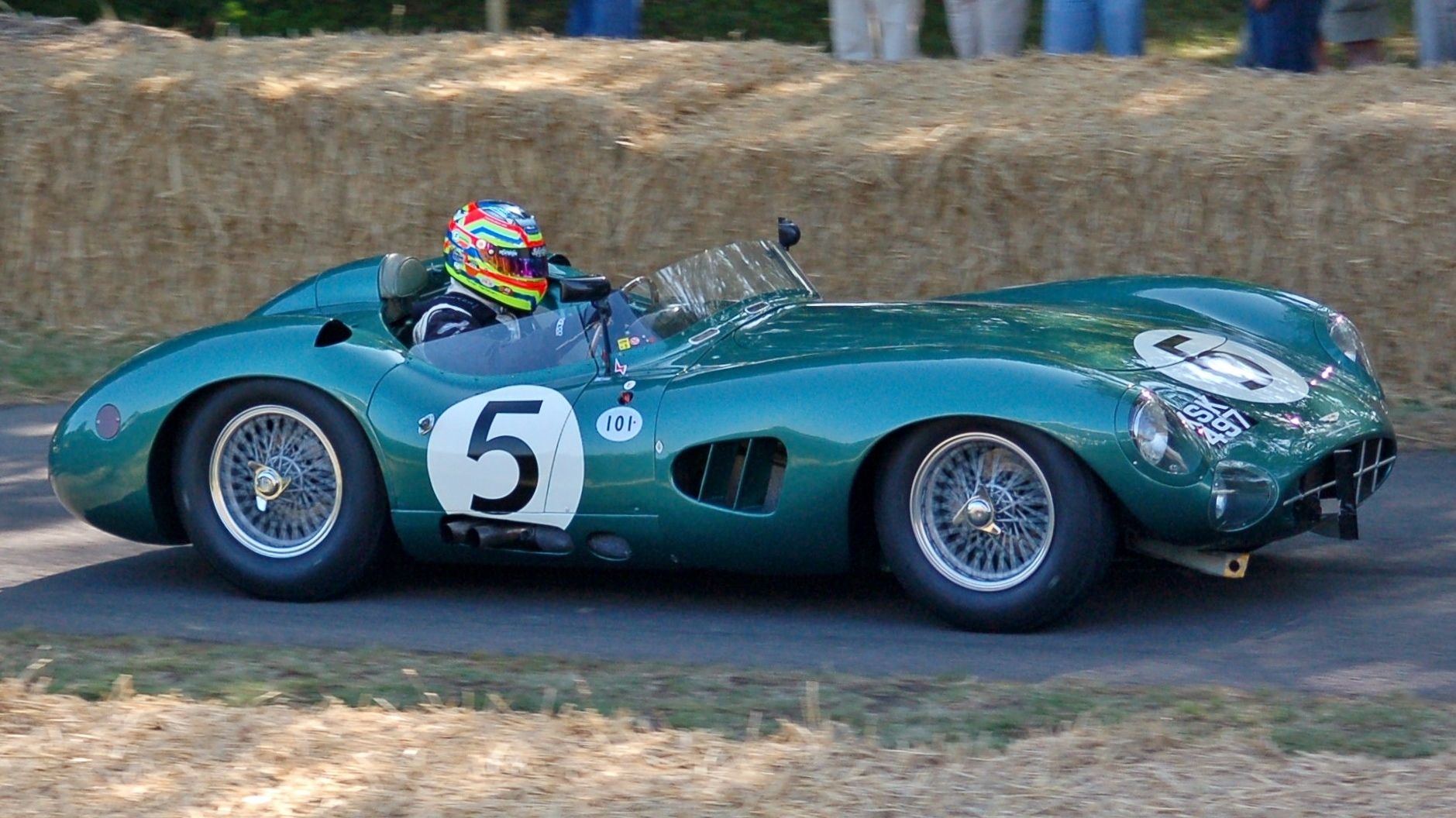
- Hardman demonstrating the 1959 Le Mans-winning Aston Martin DBR1 at the Goodwood Festival of Speed in 2009
- Nationality: English
- Born: 7 September 1964 (age 62) Redditch, Worcestershire, England
24 Hours of Le Mans career
- Years: 1993 - 1994, 2008 - 2009
- Teams: Lotus Sport, Vitaphone Racing Team, Strakka Racing
- Best finish: 21st (2009)
- Class wins: 0

Peter Hardman (born 7 September 1964 in Redditch, Worcestershire) is an English racing driver.

Though a keen spectator of rallycross in his school days, Hardman did not look set to embark on a racing career until a visit to a Jim Russell driving course at the age of 17. Taking to Mallory Park in a Formula Ford, Hardman soon showed his potential by winning his second ever race with Jim Russell.

== 1980 ==
In 1980, Hardman began a season of Formula Ford 1600, but was forced out after just three races with a broken foot. He returned to racing in 1983, once again in Formula Ford, but was an immediate success, winning the championship outright. Over the following five years, Hardman fought the age-old problem of securing budget, but raced whenever he could in Formula Ford 2000 and British Formula Three, in which he raced four meetings during the 1986 and 1987 seasons.

== 1988 ==
Hardman was thrown a lifeline in 1988 when he secured the prestigious "Racing for Britain" scholarship and took a drive in Formula Vauxhall Lotus alongside such names as Mika Hakkinen, Allan McNish and David Brabham. He won two races, finished fourth in the championship, and was honoured with the "Cellnet Award" in 1989. In 1990 and 1991, Hardman raced for the Mansell Madgwick Formula 3000 team and following that decided to make the switch to sportscars and touring cars. And in 1991, he achieved full membership of the British Racing Drivers Club, BRDC, for his national and international racing successes. The BRDC are the owners of Silverstone Circuit and run the British Formula 1 Grand Prix.

== 1992–1995 ==
Becoming an unprecedented third-successive championship winner of the Pro-Sport 3000 (he secured series victories in 1992, 1993 and 1994), Hardman was awarded the BRDC Silver Star in ’94 to credit his unparalleled result in British sportscar history. In 1993, Hardman began to branch out into historic racing, and over the coming years he combined that with his modern car racing. In 1995, he added to his trophy cabinet by winning the Formula Classic and then competed in the Super Touring North American in 1996 with Honda. In the same year, he became champion of the Ferrari Shell Historic, racing in the 330LMB.

It was in 1995 that Hardman met a private collector who owns some historic racing cars, and was entrusted to race items of the collection, including the 1959 Le Mans-winning Aston Martin.

== 1997 ==
In 1997, Hardman competed in the Daytona 24hrs, finishing sixth in the WSC Class. He also raced several historic meetings that year. The following season he took to the wheel of the McLaren F1 GTR, and also won two races at the Goodwood Revival Festival in the rare Ferrari 246S Dino sports car. In 1999, he competed in the British and Spanish GT championships with Lister, and combined that with historic racing and the Spa 24hr saloon car race. Over the following years Hardman continued to compete in historic, GT racing and endurance meetings, driving a multitude of cars.

== 2004–2005 ==
It was during this period that Hardman began to extend his business interests and launched Elite Driver Management (EDM) to manage the career of emerging star driver Westley Barber in Formula Ford, Formula 3 and Formula 3000. In 2005, in conjunction with Duller Motorsport, EDM achieved a class win in Group N in the Silverstone 24 Hours.

In late 2004, at the request of his longtime patron and friend, Hardman took on the role of mentor/coach to Nick Leventis. Hardman formed Strakka Racing from EDM in 2005, building the team from the ground up, with the goal of reaching the pinnacle of modern Sportscar racing—Le Mans 24 Hours—in five years. With Hardman as team owner, team manager, driver, and mentor/coach to Nick, the team ran first in Group N with a BMW M3, then an ex-factory BMW M3 GTR in GT2, followed by GT1 in the Aston Martin DBR9 in 2008 Le Mans Series. Finally, Hardman negotiated an assisted factory deal with Ginetta-Zytek for the move into LMP1, along with a Michelin tyre contract and an entry to Le Mans 24 Hours, for the 2009 season. In June 2009, Hardman achieved his objective for Strakka with the team’s 21st place finish at Le Mans 24 Hours.

== 2006 ==
During his five-year tenure as team owner-driver, Hardman worked with such drivers as Christian Vann, Alan Simonsson, and Darren Turner. He also continued to drive in both modern and historic races himself, competing in the Silverstone 24 Hour race in 2006, scoring a race win in the Le Mans Series at Donington in 2006, and winning the Gruppo Peroni Silver Cup in both 2006 and 2007. Hardman’s historic drives during this period included the 1957 Le Mans-winning Aston-Martin DBR1; and Ferraris 300 LMB, P3, and 246 Dino. In 2008, after 11 years of competition at Goodwood—including various wins—Hardman won the Goodwood RAC Tourist Trophy and was awarded Driver of the Meeting.

== Later career ==
Hardman announced in 2009 that he was planning to sell Strakka Racing.

In 2013, Hardman was named the chief executive of Rockingham Motor Speedway.

== 24 Hours of Le Mans results ==
Year	Class	No	Tyres	Car	Team	Co-Drivers	Laps	Pos.	Class Pos.
1993	GT	45	D	Lotus Esprit S300; Lotus 2.2L Turbo I4	(United Kingdom) Lotus Sport (United Kingdom) Chamberlain Engineering	(Japan) Yojiro Terada (Denmark) Thorkild Thyrring	92	DNF	DNF
1994	GT2	62	M	Lotus Esprit S300; Lotus 2.2L Turbo I4	(United Kingdom) Lotus Sport (United Kingdom) Chamberlain Engineering	(United Kingdom) Richard Piper (France) Olindo Iacobelli	59	DNF	DNF
2008	GT1	53	M	Aston Martin DBR9; Aston Martin 6.0L V12	(Germany) Vitaphone Racing Team (United Kingdom) Strakka Racing	(United Kingdom) Nick Leventis (Brazil) Alexandre Negrão	82	DNF	DNF
2009	LMP1	23	M	Ginetta-Zytek GZ09S; Zytek ZJ458 4.5L V8	(United Kingdom) Strakka Racing	(United Kingdom) Nick Leventis (United Kingdom) Danny Watts	325	21st	14th
