= Danny Watts =

British racing driver

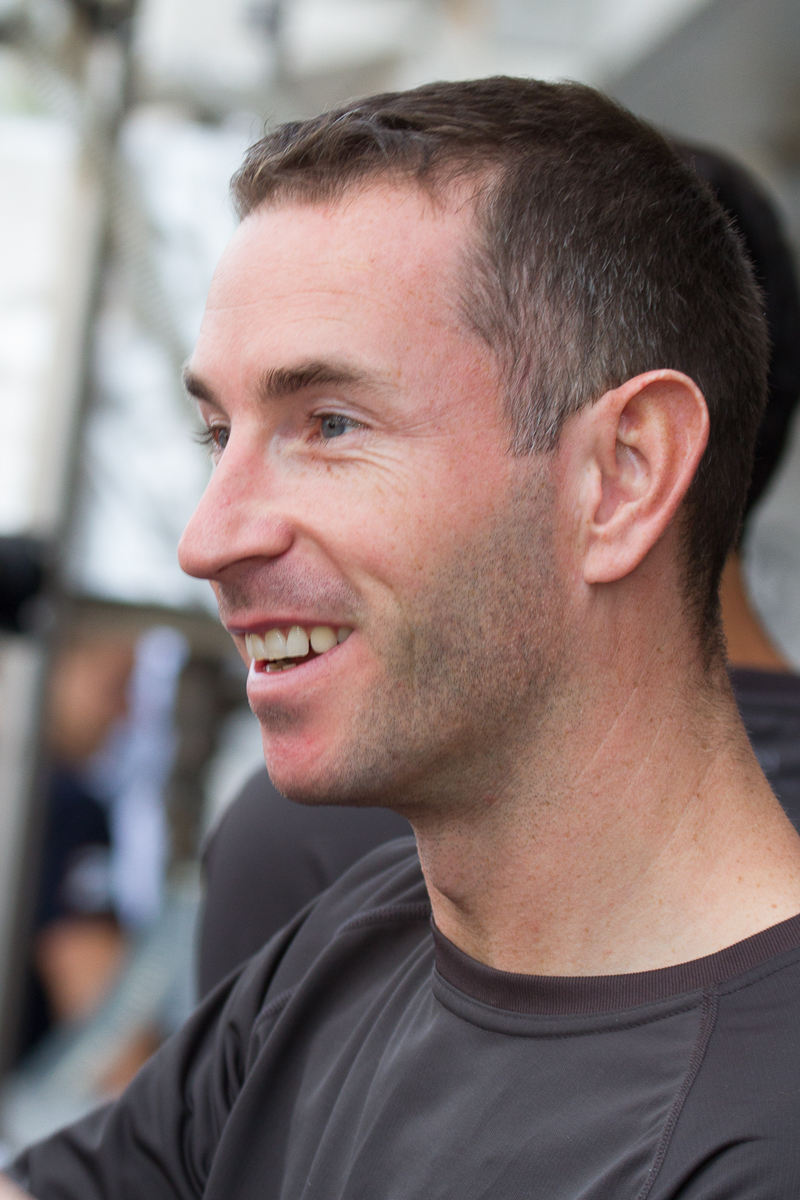
- Watts in 2012
- Nationality: (United Kingdom) British
- Born: 31 December 1979 (age 46) Aylesbury, Buckinghamshire, England
- Categorisation: FIA Platinum

24 Hours of Le Mans career
- Years: 2007, 2009 – 2013, 2015 – 2016
- Teams: Team LNT, Strakka Racing
- Best finish: 5th (2010)
- Class wins: 1 (2010)

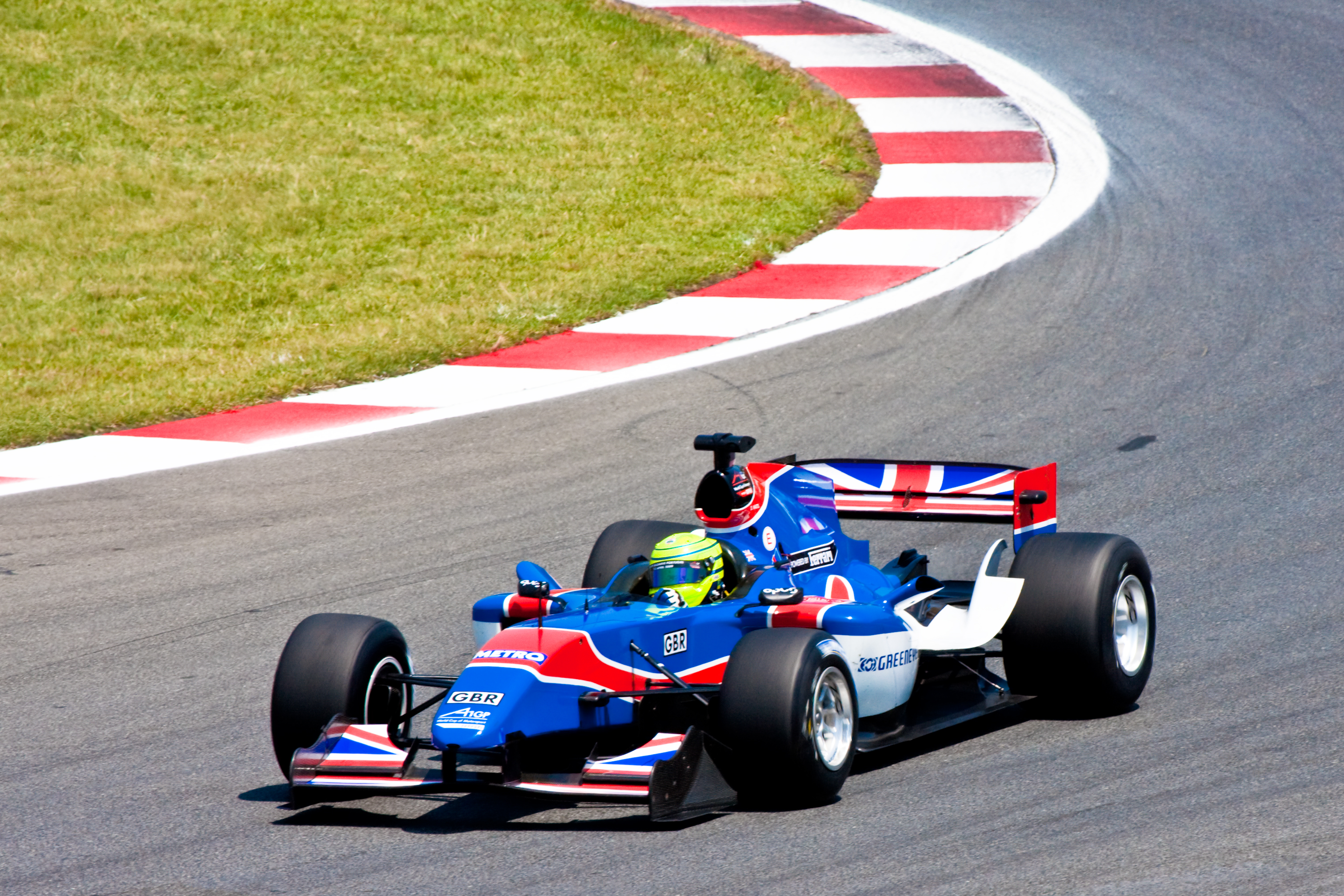
Watts competing for A1 Team Great Britain at the 2008–09 A1 Grand Prix of Nations, South Africa.

Danny Watts (born 31 December 1979) is a British former professional racing driver.

== Career ==
Watts was born in Aylesbury, and started racing in 1993, when he began karting. After five seasons of karting, he stepped up to single seater racing in 1998 in the UK Formula First championship, in which he dominated with 12 wins. He also competed in the Formula Palmer Audi Winter Series, in preparation for running the main Formula Palmer Audi championship the following year.

2000 saw a step up to the British Formula Renault Championship, when he was teammate to Kimi Räikkönen. In his third year of Formula Renault, he won the championship with six wins.

Watts ascended another tier in 2003, stepping up to the British Formula 3 Championship, with HiTech Racing. He took his first win in the series the same year in the second race at Castle Combe, having crashed out of the lead in race one. In 2004, he became the first driver for eleven years to win a round of the British Formula 3 Championship whilst not driving a car from the Dallara company.

2005 saw a mixed year for Watts. Unable to remain in Formula Three, he contested a handful of races in various disciplines. The same occurred in 2006, though he did make a brief return to F3 for the penultimate race of the season, at Thruxton, for champions Räikkönen Robertson Racing (co-owned by former British FRenault teammate, and now F1 star Kimi Räikkönen). In that race, Watts led the field and dominated proceedings with a convincing win.

In 2006, Watts raced in the Porsche Carrera Cup for the Redline Racing team. Initially he shared this drive with Richard Westbrook, only contesting races which clash with Westbrook's Porsche Carrera Cup racing, but after a run of eight successive victories in the races he started, Richard conceded the drive full-time.

For 2007, Watts drove for Team LNT in the Le Mans Series in a Panoz Esperante GT-LM. He was also invited to join A1 Team Great Britain for the fourth season of the 2007/8 season held in Shanghai, China and took part in the rookie sessions.

In 2008, Watts signed to the SAS Lechner Racing team with teammate Damien Faulkner for the F1-supporting Porsche Supercup series.

A1 Team Great Britain announced that Watts would race for A1 Team Great Britain in Chengdu; he came third in both the sprint and feature race.

For 2009, Watts raced for Strakka Racing in the Le Mans Series and the 24 Hours of Le Mans driving a Ginetta-Zytek GZ09S. In the opening round of the Le Mans Series at Barcelona, he claimed overall pole on the teams LMP1 debut.

In 2010, Watts retained his seat for Strakka Racing in the Le Mans Series however the team moved down to the LMP2 category now using a HPD ARX-01c. The car took the class victory at Le Mans finishing fifth overall.

== Personal life ==
After retiring, he came out publicly in 2017 as gay. He was previously married to Fiona Leggate with whom he had one son.

== Helmet ==
Watts' helmet colour is in honour of Oxford United Football Club, whom he supports.

== Racing record ==
=== Career summary ===
Season	Series	Team	Races	Wins	Poles	F.Laps	Podiums	Points	Position
1998	Formula First Great Britain	Mark Burdett Motorsport	?	12	12	?	?	?	**1st**
1998	Formula Palmer Audi Winter Series	?	4	0	?	?	3	80	**3rd**
1999	Formula Palmer Audi	?	14	0	0	1	0	42	22nd
2000	Formula Renault 2000 Eurocup	Manor Motorsport	?	0	0	0	1	20	16th
2000	Formula Renault 2.0 UK	Manor Motorsport	11	1	1	0	3	153	10th
2001	Formula Renault 2.0 UK	Falcon Motorsport	13	2	0	1	4	253	**3rd**
2002	Formula Renault 2.0 UK	Fortec Motorsport	13	6	4	5	11	333	**1st**
2002	Formula Renault 2000 Eurocup	Fortec Motorsport	1	0	0	0	0	0	NC
2002	Macau Asian Formula 2000 Challenge	EYHOB Motorsport	1	1	0	0	1	0	**1st**
2002	Porsche Carrera Cup Great Britain	Porsche Cars Great Britain	1	0	0	0	0	0	NC
2003	British Formula Three Championship	Hitech Grand Prix	22	1	3	2	5	125	5th
2003	Masters of Formula 3	Hitech Grand Prix	1	0	0	0	0	0	23rd
2003	Macau Grand Prix	Hitech Grand Prix	1	0	0	0	0	0	10th
2003	Korea Super Prix	Alan Docking Racing	1	0	0	0	0	0	9th
2004	British Formula Three Championship	Promatecme	21	1	1	0	4	139	6th
2004	Masters of Formula 3	Promatecme	1	0	0	0	0	0	10th
2004	Formula 3 European Cup	Promatecme	1	0	0	0	0	0	5th
2004	Japanese Formula 3 Championship	M-TEC	3	0	0	0	0	12	15th
2004	Walter Hayes Trophy	?	1	0	0	0	0	0	**2nd**
2005	British Formula Three Championship	Alan Docking Racing	2	0	0	0	1	23	13th
2005	Formula 3 Euro Series	HBR Motorsport	2	0	0	0	0	0	NC
2005	Macau Grand Prix	Team Midland Euroseries	1	0	0	0	0	0	NC
2005	Formula Renault 3.5 Series	EuroInternational	2	0	0	0	0	0	NC
2006	British Formula Three Championship	Räikkönen Robertson Racing	1	1	1	0	1	0	NC
2006	Porsche Supercup	IRWIN Redline Racing	1	0	0	0	0	0	NC
2006	Porsche Carrera Cup Great Britain	IRWIN Redline Racing	16	10	6	6	11	250	**3rd**
2006	Porsche Carrera Cup Asia	Gates GR Asia	1	1	1	1	1	0	NC
2006	British GT Championship	?	?	?	?	?	?	15	7th
2007	Le Mans Series - LMGT2	Team LNT	4	0	0	0	0	5	19th
2007	24 Hours of Le Mans - LMGT2	Team LNT	1	0	0	0	0	0	NC
2007	American Le Mans Series - LMP2	Zytek Motorsports	1	0	0	0	1	19	16th
2007	Porsche Carrera Cup Asia	?	1	0	0	0	0	0	NC
2008	Porsche Supercup	SAS Lechner Racing	12	0	0	0	1	90	9th
2008	American Le Mans Series	Team LNT	1	0	0	0	0	0	NC
2008	Aston Martin Asia Cup	Noble Group/GR Asia	2	0	0	1	1	0	NC
2008	Macau GT Cup Grand Prix	Team Road & Track	1	0	0	0	1	0	**2nd**
2008-09	A1 Grand Prix	A1 Team Great Britain	6	0	1	0	2	28	10th
2009	Le Mans Series	Strakka Racing	5	0	1	0	0	4	16th
2009	24 Hours of Le Mans	Strakka Racing	1	0	0	0	0	0	14th
2009	Porsche Carrera Cup Asia	SC Global Racing	1	0	0	0	1	0	NC
2009	Macau GT Cup Grand Prix	Team Road & Track	1	0	0	0	1	0	**3rd**
2010	Le Mans Series - LMP2	Strakka Racing	5	3	5	5	3	69	**2nd**
2010	24 Hours of Le Mans - LMP2	Strakka Racing	1	1	1	1	1	0	**1st**
2010	Macau GT Cup Grand Prix	United Autosports	1	0	0	0	1	0	**3rd**
2011	Le Mans Series - LMP2	Strakka Racing	5	0	2	0	2	43	**3rd**
2011	Intercontinental Le Mans Cup - LMP2	Strakka Racing	1	0	1	0	1	0	NC
2011	24 Hours of Le Mans - LMP2	Strakka Racing	1	0	0	0	0	0	NC
2011	Macau GT Cup Grand Prix	United Autosports	1	0	0	0	1	0	**3rd**
2012	FIA World Endurance Championship	Strakka Racing	8	0	0	0	1	64	7th
2012	24 Hours of Le Mans	Strakka Racing	1	0	0	0	0	0	8th
2012	Macau GT Cup Grand Prix	United Autosports	1	0	0	0	1	0	**3rd**
2013	FIA World Endurance Championship	Strakka Racing	3	0	0	0	0	22	15th
2013	24 Hours of Le Mans	Strakka Racing	1	0	0	0	0	0	6th
2013	Macau GT Cup Grand Prix	United Autosports	1	0	0	0	1	0	**2nd**
2013	FIA GT Series	Trackspeed	1	0	0	0	0	0	NC
2014	Macau GT Cup Grand Prix	United Autosports	1	0	0	0	0	0	19th
2014	GT Asia Series	United Autosports	1	0	0	0	0	0	NC
2015	FIA World Endurance Championship - LMP2	Strakka Racing	8	0	0	0	1	63	8th
2015	24 Hours of Le Mans	Strakka Racing	1	0	0	0	0	0	NC
2016	FIA World Endurance Championship - LMP2	Strakka Racing	3	0	0	0	0	34	15th
2016	24 Hours of Le Mans	Strakka Racing	1	0	0	0	0	0	4th

=== Complete Porsche Supercup results ===
(key) (Races in bold indicate pole position – 2 points awarded 2008 onwards in all races) (Races in italics indicate fastest lap)

Year	Team	1	2	3	4	5	6	7	8	9	10	11	12	DC	Points	Ref
2006	IRWIN Redline Racing	BHR	ITA	GER	ESP	MON	GBR; 22	USA	USA	FRA	GER	HUN	ITA	NC‡	0‡	
2008	SAS Lechner Racing	BHR; 6	BHR; 7	ESP; 6	TUR; 7	MON; 19	FRA; 5	GBR; 2	GER; 27	HUN; 4	ESP; 21†	BEL; 26†	ITA; 10	9th	91	

† – Did not finish the race, but was classified as he completed over 90% of the race distance. ‡ – Guest driver – Not eligible for points.

=== 24 Hours of Le Mans results ===
Year	Team	Co-Drivers	Car	Class	Laps	Pos.	Class Pos.
2007	(United Kingdom) Team LNT	(United Kingdom) Tom Kimber-Smith (United States) Tom Milner, Jr.	Panoz Esperante GT-LM	GT2	60	DNF	DNF
2009	(United Kingdom) Strakka Racing	(United Kingdom) Nick Leventis (United Kingdom) Peter Hardman	Ginetta-Zytek GZ09S	LMP1	325	21st	14th
2010	(United Kingdom) Strakka Racing	(United Kingdom) Jonny Kane (United Kingdom) Nick Leventis	HPD ARX-01C	LMP2	367	5th	**1st**
2011	(United Kingdom) Strakka Racing	(United Kingdom) Jonny Kane (United Kingdom) Nick Leventis	HPD ARX-01d	LMP2	144	DNF	DNF
2012	(United Kingdom) Strakka Racing	(United Kingdom) Jonny Kane (United Kingdom) Nick Leventis	HPD ARX-03a	LMP1	303	30th	8th
2013	(United Kingdom) Strakka Racing	(United Kingdom) Jonny Kane (United Kingdom) Nick Leventis	HPD ARX-03c	LMP1	332	6th	6th
2015	(United Kingdom) Strakka Racing	(United Kingdom) Jonny Kane (United Kingdom) Nick Leventis	Strakka Dome S103-Nissan	LMP2	264	DNF	DNF
2016	(United Kingdom) Strakka Racing	(United Kingdom) Jonny Kane (United Kingdom) Nick Leventis	Gibson 015S-Nissan	LMP2	351	8th	4th

=== Complete A1 Grand Prix results ===
(key) (Races in bold indicate pole position) (Races in italics indicate fastest lap)

Year	Entrant	1	2	3	4	5	6	7	8	9	10	11	12	13	14	DC	Points	Ref
2008–09	Great Britain	NED; SPR	NED; FEA	CHN; SPR; 3	**CHN**; **FEA**; 3	MYS; SPR; Ret	MYS; FEA; 16	NZL; SPR	NZL; FEA	RSA; SPR; Ret	RSA; FEA; 7	POR; SPR	POR; FEA	GBR; SPR	GBR; FEA	10th	28	

=== Complete FIA World Endurance Championship results ===
Year	Entrant	Class	Car	Engine	1	2	3	4	5	6	7	8	9	Rank	Points
2012	Strakka Racing	LMP1	HPD ARX-03a	Honda LM-V8 3.4 L V8	SEB; 8	SPA; 6	LMS; 22	SIL; 5	SÃO; 5	BHR; 3	FUJ; 6	SHA; 6		7th	64
2013	Strakka Racing	LMP1	HPD ARX-03c	Honda LM-V8 3.4 L V8	SIL; Ret	SPA; 7	LMS; 6	SÃO	COA	FUJ	SHA	BHR		15th	22
2015	Strakka Racing	LMP2	Strakka Dome S103	Nissan VK45DE 4.5 L V8	SIL; 3	SPA; 5	LMS; Ret	NÜR; 7	COA; 7	FUJ; 6	SHA; 6	BHR; 5		8th	63
2016	Strakka Racing	LMP2	Gibson 015S	Nissan VK45DE 4.5 L V8	SIL; 5	SPA; DNF	LMS; 4	NÜR	MEX	COA	FUJ	SHA	BHR	15th	34

Sporting positions
Preceded by Carl Breeze	British Formula Renault; UK series champion 2002	Succeeded by Lewis Hamilton
Awards
Preceded by Mike Jordan	Autosport; British Club Driver of the Year; 2002	Succeeded by Lewis Hamilton
