= Jonny Kane =

British racing driver (born 1973)

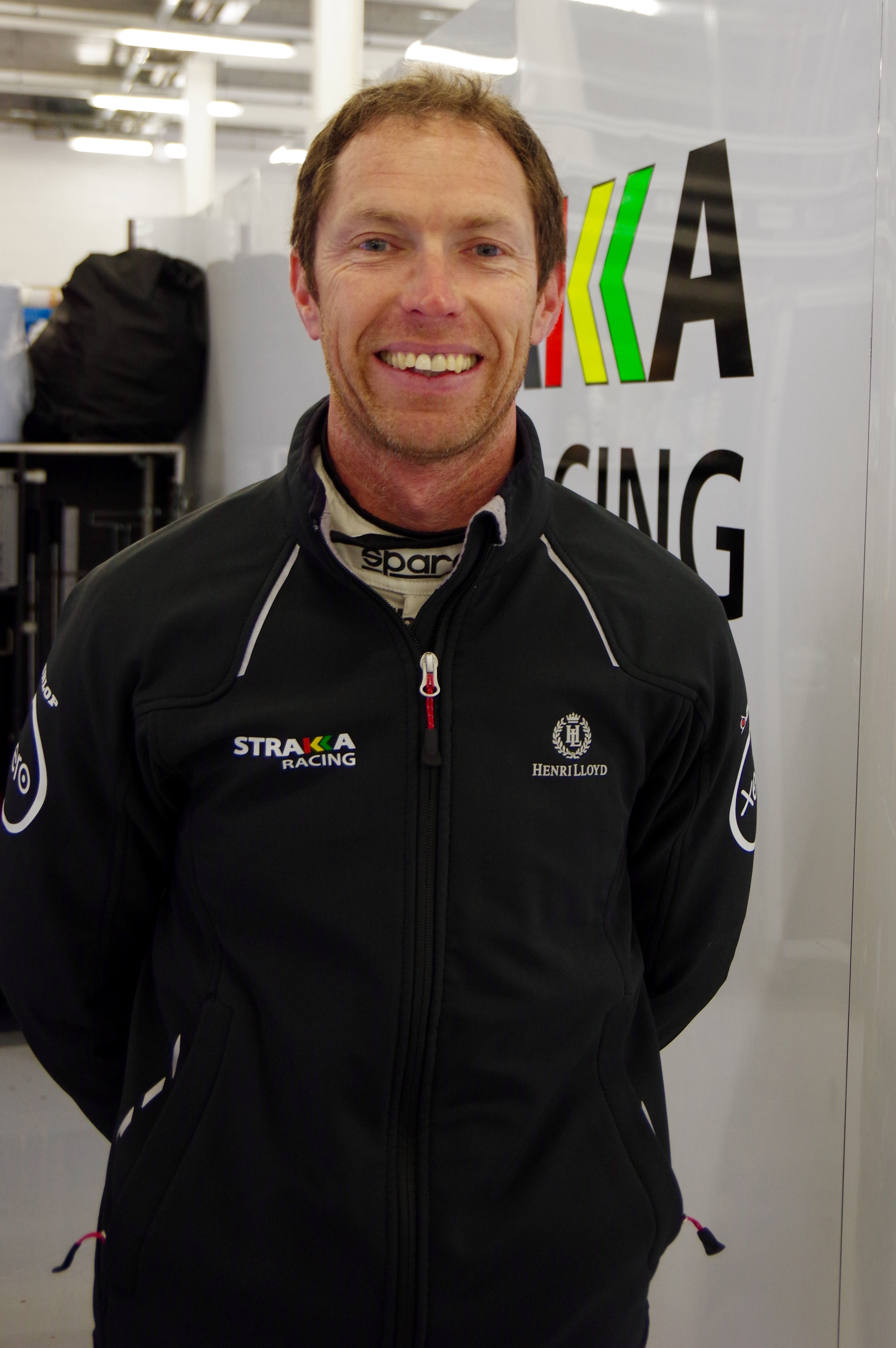
- Kane at the 2016 6 Hours of Silverstone
- Nationality: (United Kingdom) British
- Born: Jonathan Ernest Kane; 14 May 1973 (age 53) Comber, County Down, Northern Ireland
- Categorisation: FIA Platinum (until 2017); FIA Gold (2018–)

24 Hours of Le Mans career
- Years: 2001–2002, 2006–2013, 2015–2016
- Teams: MG Sport & Racing Ltd., Spyker Squadron, Embassy Racing, Speedy Racing Team Sebah, Strakka Racing
- Best finish: 5th (2010)
- Class wins: 2 (2010)

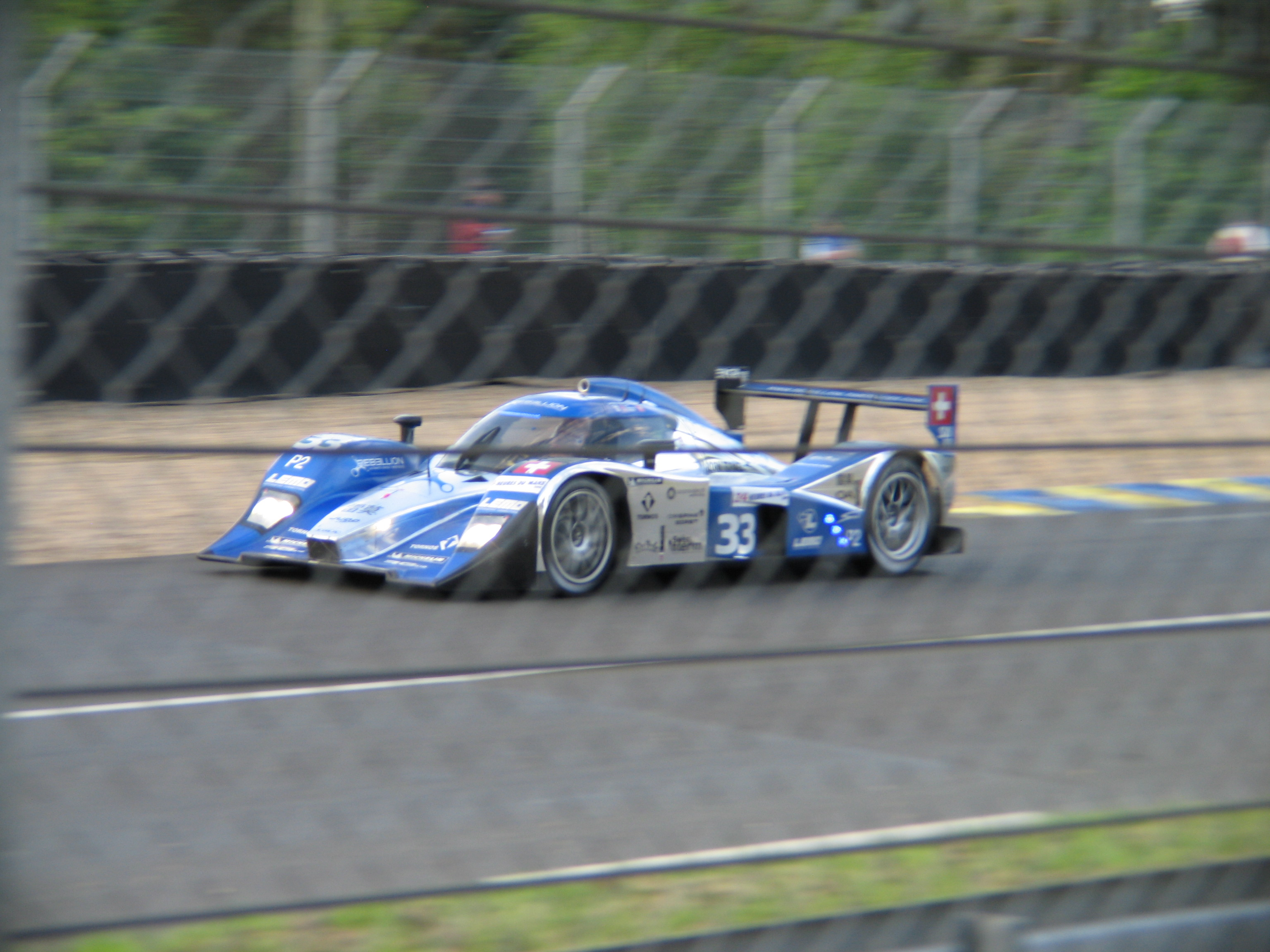
Kane driving the Lola B08/80 during the 2009 24 Hours of Le Mans.

Jonathan Ernest Kane (born 14 May 1973) is a British racing driver who has competed at various levels of motorsport. He currently drives for Strakka Racing in the Le Mans Series.

Kane, who was born in Comber, Northern Ireland, began his career in karting and Formula Ford. In 1994 and 1995, he raced in Formula Vauxhall and Formula Opel where he was the 1994 British winter champion and the 1995 overall British champion. He then spent two years in British Formula 3 driving for Paul Stewart Racing where he captured 6 wins and won the 1997 championship. He made four starts in Formula 3000 in 1998 with marginal results, then came to the United States and raced in Indy Lights in 1999 and 2000, winning two races and finishing fourth in series points in 1999 for Team KOOL Green. He was a test driver for the Arrows Formula One team in 2001, then moved to sports cars, driving in the Le Mans Series and American Le Mans Series with amongst others Aston Martin. In 2005, he made his FIA GT debut and has driven for TVR and Spyker.

Since 2006, Kane has competed at the 24 Hours of Le Mans with a best finish of fifth overall at the 2010 event which was also a LMP2 class victory in the HPD ARX-01C for Strakka Racing. Since 2008, Kane has completed in the LMP2 class of Le Mans Series for a number of teams including Embassy Racing and Strakka. At the 2010 1000 km of Hungaroring, Kane made history by winning the race outright in a LMP2 car co-driven by Danny Watts and Nick Leventis. This was the first time that a LMP2 car had taken first, both in qualifying (pole position) and the race.

== Racing record ==
=== Complete American open-wheel racing results ===
(key)

==== Indy Lights ====
| Year | Team | 1 | 2 | 3 | 4 | 5 | 6 | 7 | 8 | 9 | 10 | 11 | 12 | Rank | Points | Ref |
|---|---|---|---|---|---|---|---|---|---|---|---|---|---|---|---|---|
| 1999 | Team Green | MIA; 7 | LBH; 16 | NAZ; 12 | MIL; 9 | POR; 6 | CLE; 18 | TOR; 5 | MIS; 7 | DET; 3 | CHI; 9 | LAG; 3 | FON; 1 | 4th | 89 | |
| 2000 | Team Green | LBH; 6 | MIL; 16 | DET; 1 | POR; 17 | MIS; 17 | CHI; DNS | MDO; 10 | VAN; 15 | LS; 5 | STL; 9 | HOU; 13 | FON; 10 | 10th | 52 | |

=== 24 Hours of Le Mans results ===
| Year | Team | Co-Drivers | Car | Class | Laps | Pos. | Class Pos. |
|---|---|---|---|---|---|---|---|
| 2001 | (United Kingdom) MG Sport & Racing Ltd. | (United Kingdom) Anthony Reid (United Kingdom) Warren Hughes | MG-Lola EX257 | LMP675 | 30 | DNF | DNF |
| 2002 | (United Kingdom) MG Sport & Racing Ltd. | (United Kingdom) Anthony Reid (United Kingdom) Warren Hughes | MG-Lola EX257 | LMP675 | 129 | DNF | DNF |
| 2006 | (Netherlands) Spyker Squadron b.v. | (Netherlands) Jeroen Bleekemolen (Netherlands) Mike Hezemans | Spyker C8 Spyder GT2-R | GT2 | 202 | DNF | DNF |
| 2007 | (Netherlands) Spyker Squadron b.v. | (Czech Republic) Jaroslav Janiš (Netherlands) Mike Hezemans | Spyker C8 Spyder GT2-R | GT2 | 70 | DNF | DNF |
| 2008 | (United Kingdom) Embassy Racing | (United Kingdom) Warren Hughes (United Kingdom) Joey Foster | Embassy WF01-Zytek | LMP2 | 213 | DNF | DNF |
| 2009 | (Switzerland) Speedy Racing Team (United Kingdom) Sebah Automotive | (Switzerland) Benjamin Leuenberger (France) Xavier Pompidou | Lola B08/80-Judd | LMP2 | 343 | 12th | 2nd |
| 2010 | (United Kingdom) Strakka Racing | (United Kingdom) Nick Leventis (United Kingdom) Danny Watts | HPD ARX-01C | LMP2 | 367 | 5th | 1st |
| 2011 | (United Kingdom) Strakka Racing | (United Kingdom) Nick Leventis (United Kingdom) Danny Watts | HPD ARX-01d | LMP2 | 144 | DNF | DNF |
| 2012 | (United Kingdom) Strakka Racing | (United Kingdom) Nick Leventis (United Kingdom) Danny Watts | HPD ARX-03a | LMP1 | 303 | 30th | 8th |
| 2013 | (United Kingdom) Strakka Racing | (United Kingdom) Nick Leventis (United Kingdom) Danny Watts | HPD ARX-03c | LMP1 | 332 | 6th | 6th |
| 2015 | (United Kingdom) Strakka Racing | (United Kingdom) Nick Leventis (United Kingdom) Danny Watts | Strakka Dome S103-Nissan | LMP2 | 264 | DNF | DNF |
| 2016 | (United Kingdom) Strakka Racing | (United Kingdom) Nick Leventis (United Kingdom) Danny Watts | Gibson 015S-Nissan | LMP2 | 351 | 8th | 4th |

=== Complete FIA World Endurance Championship results ===
| Year | Entrant | Class | Car | Engine | 1 | 2 | 3 | 4 | 5 | 6 | 7 | 8 | 9 | Rank | Points |
|---|---|---|---|---|---|---|---|---|---|---|---|---|---|---|---|
| 2012 | Strakka Racing | LMP1 | HPD ARX-03a | Honda LM-V8 3.4 L V8 | SEB; 8 | SPA; 6 | LMS; 22 | SIL; 5 | SÃO; 5 | BHR; 3 | FUJ; 6 | SHA; 6 | | 7th | 64 |
| 2013 | Strakka Racing | LMP1 | HPD ARX-03c | Honda LM-V8 3.4 L V8 | SIL; Ret | SPA; 7 | LMS; 6 | SÃO | COA | FUJ | SHA | BHR | | 15th | 22 |
| 2015 | Strakka Racing | LMP2 | Strakka Dome S103 | Nissan VK45DE 4.5 L V8 | SIL; 3 | SPA; 5 | LMS; Ret | NÜR; 7 | COA; 7 | FUJ; 6 | SHA; 6 | BHR; 5 | | 6th | 63 |
| 2016 | Strakka Racing | LMP2 | Gibson 015S | Nissan VK45DE 4.5 L V8 | SIL; 5 | SPA; Ret | LMS; 4 | NÜR; 4 | MEX; 4 | COA; Ret | FUJ; 6 | SHA | BHR | 8th | 66 |

Sporting positions
| Preceded by Ralph Firman | British Formula Three Champion; 1997 | Succeeded by Mario Haberfeld |
Awards
| Preceded by Jamie Davies | McLaren Autosport BRDC Award; 1995 | Succeeded by Darren Turner |
