= Nick Leventis =

British racing driver

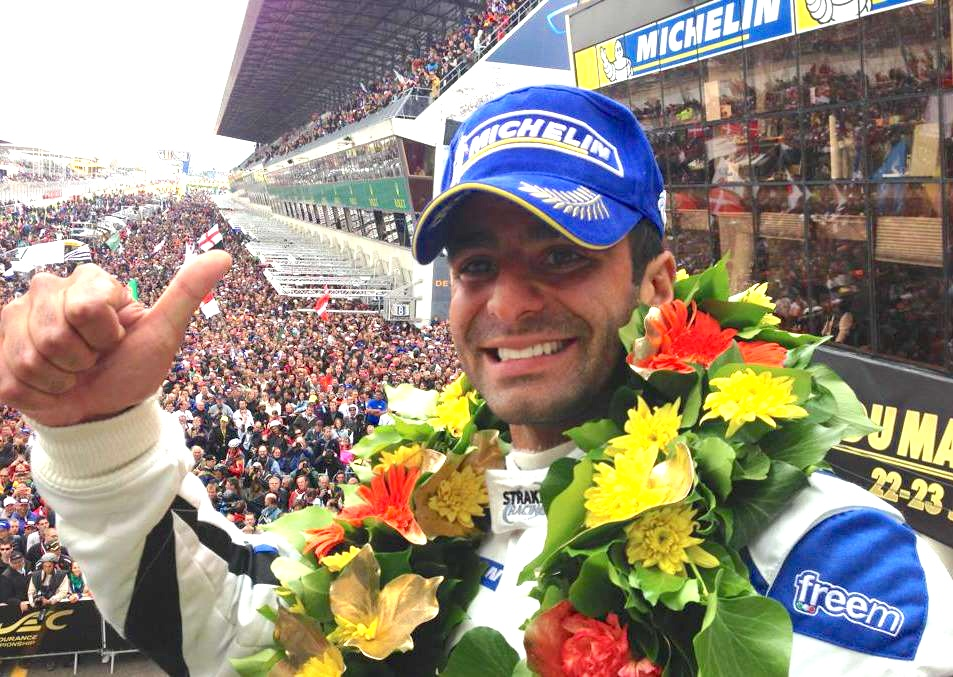
- Nationality: British
- Born: 31 January 1980 (age 46) London, England
- Categorisation: FIA Silver (until 2017); FIA Bronze (2018–)

Nicholas Leventis (born 31 January 1980) is a British former professional endurance racing driver, entrepreneur and philanthropist. He is the founder of Strakka Racing and has competed internationally in the FIA World Endurance Championship and the 24 Hours of Le Mans, achieving multiple class wins and setting several endurance-racing records. One of his most memorable successes was winning the 2010 24 Hours of Le Mans in the LMP2 category with Danny Watts and Jonny Kane, breaking five records in the process. In 2013, he claimed another victory in the 24 Hours of Le Mans, this time in the top class of LMP 1 privateers. He is currently based in Monaco.

== Early life ==
Nicholas Leventis was born in Kensington, London of Persian / Greek Cypriot heritage, and educated at Harrow School with a notable mention, and later studied at the University of Edinburgh. After completing his studies, Leventis lived and worked in Romania and Nigeria. He initially pursued a career as a competitive alpine skiing but a back injury ended his trajectory in winter sports and led him to motorsport. He began racing with EDM Motorsport before founding Strakka Racing in 2006.

== Personal life ==
Leventis is married to Ukrainian-born former model and PR entrepreneur Olga Leventis. The couple met in Los Angeles before later marrying in Monaco.

== Net worth ==
Leventis is a member of the prominent Leventis family, which built its wealth through the Nigerian Bottling Company and later Coca-Cola HBC, one of the largest Coca-Cola anchor bottlers, operating in 43 countries across Europe and Africa by the end of 2026. The Leventis family were ranked 60th in the 2024 list of the wealthiest people in the United Kingdom, with an estimated combined fortune of about €3.5 billion, mainly due to their long-standing Coca-Cola bottling interests and properties around the world.

== Racing ==
2004 - Start of racing career, driving a BMW M3 in the BMW LMA Euro Saloon Championship, dominating Class B and finishing runner-up in the overall standings. He proved his merit in endurance racing and achieved a class win and 6th overall in the first-ever Silverstone Britcar 24 Hour.

2005 - Leventis competed in the Ferrari Historic Challenge and Le Mans Classic, driving a rare Ferrari Dino 246 and scoring encouraging results.

2006 and 2007 - Victories in the Roy Salvadori Trophy at the Silverstone Classic meeting with a 1957 Aston Martin DBR1. In 2007 he reached a personal landmark with a Le Mans podium in the Legends race driving a Ferrari P3.

Leventis also competed in the Belgian and Italian Touring Car Series, gaining several podiums, two class victories at Spa and consecutive wins in the prestigious Vallelunga 6 Hour Silver Cup. Other successes included podium in the Epilogue of Brno 6 Hour race and a GT1 class win and second overall in the highly competitive Vallelunga Gold Cup.

2007 - Created Strakka Racing, one of Britain's leading independent racing teams.

2008 - Strakka Racing and Leventis progressed to the iconic Le Mans 24 Hours with an Aston Martin DBR9 GT1.

2009 - Nicholas and Strakka Racing stepped up to a Ginetta-Zytek GZ09S LMP1 sports prototype in the Le Mans Series. Partnered by Danny Watts and Peter Hardman, Leventis and the team claimed an impressive pole in Barcelona and finished 14th in LMP1 in the Le Mans 24 Hours.

2010 - Raced an LMP2 twin-turbo V6 engined HPD ARX-01c in the Le Mans Series, scoring an LMP2 victory at the Le Mans 24 Hour race and breaking five records. The team also achieved the first ever LMS victory for an LMP2 chassis, winning the 1,000km race at the Hungaroring.

2011 - Became the first LMP2 driver to achieve two overall victories in the Le Mans Series.

2012 and 2013 - Raced in the FIA World Endurance Championship with an LMP1 class HPD ARX-03a with Johnny Kane and Danny Watts. The team finished on the FIA Endurance Trophy for Private LMP1 Teams' podium in all eight races – achieving the 100% record with an outstanding final stint in Shanghai by Leventis when he took the car from fourth to third in the closing stages of the race. The highlight of the season was a third overall finish at the 6 Hours of Bahrain.

2012 - Leventis was the brainchild behind the creation of Strakka Performance in 2012, a driver development programme designed to nurture young talent to the best they can.

2013 - Leventis took over the P1 Motorsport Formula Renault 3.5 team, integrating it into Strakka Racing's driver development programme.

2015 – Leventis spearheaded the design and production of Strakka's own car, the DOME S103 at the 6 Hours of Silverstone, claiming a third place on its debut.

2016 – He became a member of the prestigious BRDC (British Racing Drivers' Club), home to the most successful racing drivers from Great Britain and the Commonwealth.

With the Gibson-Nissan, Strakka's team consisting of Leventis, Jonny Kane and Danny Watts came fourth in the LMP2 class (eight overall) at the 24 Hours of Le Mans. Nick accepted the BRDC Woolf Barnato Trophy awarded to the highest placed British driver at the 24 Hours of Le Mans.

2017 – Leventis and Strakka Racing started working with a major GT3 manufacturer, McLaren. They entered the challenging Blancpain GT Series with four McLaren 650S GT3.

2018 - In 2018, he would expand Strakka Racing's GT activities beyond Europe, forming a new partnership with Mercedes-AMG which will see them carry Performance Team status for the German marque. The Silverstone-based team will run three new Mercedes-AMG GT3s in the Intercontinental GT Challenge alongside Blancpain GT Series Endurance Cup.

2019 - On the 24th of July, it was revealed that Leventis had tested positive to banned substances. He was thus banned for four years. Following this incident, he announced his retirement.

== Racing Record ==
=== Britcar 24 Hour results ===
Year	Team	Co-Drivers	Car	Car No.	Class	Laps	Pos.	Class Pos.	Ref
2007	(United Kingdom) EDM Motorsport	(United Kingdom) Peter Hardman (United Kingdom) Christian Vann	BMW M3 E46 GTR	22	GTC	435	32nd	11th	

=== 24 Hours of Le Mans results ===
Year	Team	Co-Drivers	Car	Class	Laps	Pos.	Class Pos.
2008	(Germany) Vitaphone Racing Team (United Kingdom) Strakka Racing	(United Kingdom) Peter Hardman (Brazil) Alexandre Sarnes Negrão	Aston Martin DBR9	GT1	82	DNF	DNF
2009	(United Kingdom) Strakka Racing	(United Kingdom) Peter Hardman (United Kingdom) Danny Watts	Ginetta-Zytek GZ09S	LMP1	325	21st	14th
2010	(United Kingdom) Strakka Racing	(United Kingdom) Jonny Kane (United Kingdom) Danny Watts	HPD ARX-01C	LMP2	367	5th	1st
2011	(United Kingdom) Strakka Racing	(United Kingdom) Jonny Kane (United Kingdom) Danny Watts	HPD ARX-01d	LMP2	144	DNF	DNF
2012	(United Kingdom) Strakka Racing	(United Kingdom) Jonny Kane (United Kingdom) Danny Watts	HPD ARX-03a	LMP1	303	30th	8th
2013	(United Kingdom) Strakka Racing	(United Kingdom) Jonny Kane (United Kingdom) Danny Watts	HPD ARX-03c	LMP1	332	6th	6th
2015	(United Kingdom) Strakka Racing	(United Kingdom) Jonny Kane (United Kingdom) Danny Watts	Strakka Dome S103-Nissan	LMP2	264	DNF	DNF
2016	(United Kingdom) Strakka Racing	(United Kingdom) Jonny Kane (United Kingdom) Danny Watts	Gibson 015S-Nissan	LMP2	351	8th	4th

=== Complete FIA World Endurance Championship results ===
Year	Entrant	Class	Car	Engine	1	2	3	4	5	6	7	8	9	Rank	Points
2012	Strakka Racing	LMP1	HPD ARX-03a	Honda LM-V8 3.4 L V8	SEB; 8	SPA; 6	LMS; 22	SIL; 5	SÃO; 5	BHR; 3	FUJ; 6	SHA; 6		7th	64
2013	Strakka Racing	LMP1	HPD ARX-03c	Honda LM-V8 3.4 L V8	SIL; Ret	SPA; 7	LMS; 6	SÃO	COA	FUJ	SHA	BHR		15th	22
2015	Strakka Racing	LMP2	Strakka DOME S103	Nissan VK45DE 4.5 L V8	SIL; 3	SPA; 5	LMS ret	NÜR; 7	COA; 7	FUJ; 6	SHA; 6	BHR; 5		6th	63
2016	Strakka Racing	LMP2	Gibson 015S	Nissan VK45DE 4.5 L V8	SIL; 5	SPA ret	LMS; 4	NÜR; 11	MEX; 4	COA ret	FUJ; 6	SHA	BHR	7th	66

== Philanthropy ==
Leventis has been involved in charitable work connected to his family's long-standing philanthropic tradition through the A. G. Leventis Foundation, which supports education, culture and environmental projects in Europe and Africa and has funded thousands of scholarships worldwide. In 2010, Leventis took part in the Everest Skydive project in Nepal as an ambassador for the charity Global Angels, completing a tandem skydive from around 30,000 feet above Mount Everest to raise funds for vulnerable children and communities. In 2012, Leventis abseiled down The Shard in London as part of a charity event supporting the Royal Marines Charitable Trust Fund, joining fellow World Endurance Championship drivers in the fundraiser.

In 2018, Leventis participated in a charity football match with Manchester United football player Dimitar Berbatov to raise money for charity in Bulgaria, supporting children's orphanages and the conservation of the Orthodox church. Leventis has also participated in long-distance running events, including the New York City Marathon in 2011, finishing in 3:11:33, in support of charitable causes.

After retiring, Leventis expanded his charitable focus by developing the Uprise Project—later known as the Uprising Project- aiming to inspire large-scale positive action by channelling collective motivation into meaningful environmental and social initiatives.

== Awards and honours ==
2010 LMP2 class winner at the 24 Hours of Le Mans with Strakka Racing, setting multiple category performance records, the Michelin Green X Challenge (Prototype category) at the 24 Hours of Le Mans and the Nigel Moores Trophy as a private entrant who has established the most meritorious performances in international motor racing.

2013, became the first privateer to achieve an overall podium in the World Endurance Championship.

2016 BRDC Woolf Barnato Trophy (with Jonny Kane and Danny Watts) for being the highest-placed British drivers in a British car at the 24 Hours of Le Mans, and RMA Trophy of driver of the year for outstanding performance.

Sporting positions
Preceded by Jonathan Adam; Ahmad Al Harthy	Blancpain GT Series Endurance Cup; Pro-Am Champion; 2018; With: Lewis Williamson & Chris Buncombe	Succeeded by Charlie Eastwood; Ahmad Al Harthy; Salih Yoluç
