= 2012 6 Hours of Bahrain =

Sports car endurance race held at Bahrain International Circuit, Sakhir, Bahrain

Coordinates: 26°1′57″N 50°30′38″E

Event information
- Round 6 of 8 in the 2012 FIA World Endurance Championship
- Date: 29 September 2012
- Location: Sakhir
- Venue: Bahrain International Circuit
- Duration: 6 Hours

Results
- Laps completed: 191
- Distance (km): 1033.692
- Distance (miles): 642.333
- LMP1

Pole position
- Time: 1:45.814
- Team: (Germany) Audi Sport Team Joest
- Drivers: (United Kingdom) Allan McNish

Winners
- Team: (Germany) Audi Sport Team Joest
- Drivers: (Germany) André Lotterer (Switzerland) Marcel Fässler (France) Benoît Tréluyer
- LMP2

Winners
- Team: (Argentina) Pecom Racing
- Drivers: (Germany) Pierre Kaffer (France) Nicolas Minassian (Argentina) Luís Pérez Companc
- LMGTE Pro

Winners
- Team: (Italy) AF Corse
- Drivers: (Finland) Toni Vilander (Italy) Giancarlo Fisichella
- LMGTE Am

Winners
- Team: (Germany) Team Felbermayr-Proton
- Drivers: (Germany) Christian Ried (Italy) Gianluca Roda (Italy) Paolo Ruberti

The 2012 6 Hours of Bahrain was an auto race held at Bahrain International Circuit, Sakhir, Bahrain on Saturday 29 September 2012. It was the inaugural running of the 6 Hours of Bahrain and the sixth round of the 2012 FIA World Endurance Championship season.

The race was dominated by Audi Sport Team Joest who swept to a 1–2 victory with Benoît Tréluyer, Marcel Fässler and André Lotterer taking a one lap win over the Audi R18 e-tron quattro of Allan McNish and Tom Kristensen. Nicolas Lapierre for Toyota lead early in the race only to pit with faulty number plate illumination, losing over ten minutes in the pits before ultimately retired after a collision. The Strakka Racing HPD claimed third, six laps behind the winners.

The LMP2 category was won by the Pecom Racing Oreca 03 driven by Pierre Kaffer, Nicolas Minassian and Luís Pérez Companc, who held a two lap gap over the bulk of the class Signatech's of Jordan Tresson, Olivier Lombard and Franck Mailleux finished in second place. The AF Corse Ferrari pair of Toni Vilander and Giancarlo Fisichella won LMGTE Pro by a lap over Aston Martin Racing, which allowed AF Corse to wrap up the class championship. AF Corse's Olivier Beretta, driving another Ferrari, was excluded from the event after making avoidable contact with Greaves Motorsports' Ricardo González. Porsche won LMGTE Am class with the Team Felbermayr-Proton 997 of Christian Ried, Gianluca Roda and Paolo Ruberti leading by a lap over the Waltrip Ferrari.

== Qualifying ==
=== Qualifying result ===
Pole position winners in each class are marked in bold.

Pos	Class	Team	Driver	Lap Time	Grid
**1**	**LMP1**	**#2 Audi Sport Team Joest**	**Allan McNish**	**1:45.814**	**1**
2	LMP1	#1 Audi Sport Team Joest	Marcel Fässler	1:45.888	2
3	LMP1	#7 Toyota Racing	Nicolas Lapierre	1:46.254	3
4	LMP1	#12 Rebellion Racing	Neel Jani	1:47.638	4
5	LMP1	#21 Strakka Racing	Danny Watts	1:48.446	5
6	LMP1	#22 JRM	Karun Chandhok	1:48.784	6
**7**	**LMP2**	**#44 Starworks Motorsport**	**Stéphane Sarrazin**	**1:51.798**	**7**
8	LMP2	#25 ADR-Delta	John Martin	1:52.285	8
9	LMP2	#24 OAK Racing	Olivier Pla	1:52.368	9
10	LMP2	#35 OAK Racing	Dominik Kraihamer	1:52.609	10
11	LMP2	#49 Pecom Racing	Nicolas Minassian	1:52.624	11
12	LMP2	#32 Lotus	James Rossiter	1:52.696	12
13	LMP2	#26 Signatech-Nissan	Roman Rusinov	1:53.328	13
14	LMP2	#31 Lotus	Thomas Holzer	1:53.733	14
15	LMP2	#23 Signatech-Nissan	Jordan Tresson	1:53.793	15
16	LMP2	#29 Gulf Racing Middle East	Fabien Giroix	1:55.465	16
17	LMP2	#41 Greaves Motorsport	Christian Zugel	1:58.603	17
**18**	**LMGTE Pro**	**#97 Aston Martin Racing**	**Stefan Mücke**	**2:00.234**	**18**
19	LMGTE Pro	#77 Team Felbermayr-Proton	Richard Lietz	2:00.532	19
20	LMGTE Pro	#51 AF Corse	Giancarlo Fisichella	2:01.522	20
21	LMGTE Pro	#71 AF Corse	Olivier Beretta	2:01.861	21
**22**	**LMGTE Am**	**#61 AF Corse-Waltrip**	**Rui Águas**	**2:02.812**	**22**
23	LMGTE Am	#50 Larbre Compétition	Fernando Rees	2:03.253	23
24	LMGTE Am	#88 Team Felbermayr-Proton	Paolo Ruberti	2:03.686	24
25	LMGTE Am	#70 Larbre Compétition	Christophe Bourret	2:04.934	25
26	LMGTE Am	#55 JWA-Avila	Joël Camathias	2:05.572	26
27	LMGTE Am	#57 Krohn Racing	Tracy Krohn	2:06.806	27
—	LMP1	#13 Rebellion Racing	No Time		28

== Race ==
=== Race result ===
Class winners in bold. Cars failing to complete 70% of winner's distance marked as Not Classified (NC).

Pos	Class	No	Team	Drivers	Chassis	Tyre	Laps	Time/Retired
Pos	Class	No	Team	Drivers	Engine	Tyre	Laps	Time/Retired
1	**LMP1**	**1**	**(Germany) Audi Sport Team Joest**	**(France) Benoît Tréluyer (Switzerland) Marcel Fässler (Germany) André Lotterer**	**Audi R18 e-tron quattro**	MI	**191**	**6:00:56.244**
1	**LMP1**	**1**	**(Germany) Audi Sport Team Joest**	**(France) Benoît Tréluyer (Switzerland) Marcel Fässler (Germany) André Lotterer**	**Audi TDI 3.7 L Turbo V6 (Hybrid Diesel)**	MI	**191**	**6:00:56.244**
2	LMP1	2	(Germany) Audi Sport Team Joest	(United Kingdom) Allan McNish (Denmark) Tom Kristensen	Audi R18 e-tron quattro	MI	190	+1 Lap
2	LMP1	2	(Germany) Audi Sport Team Joest	(United Kingdom) Allan McNish (Denmark) Tom Kristensen	Audi TDI 3.7 L Turbo V6 (Hybrid Diesel)	MI	190	+1 Lap
3	LMP1	21	(United Kingdom) Strakka Racing	(United Kingdom) Jonny Kane (United Kingdom) Danny Watts (United Kingdom) Nick Leventis	HPD ARX-03a	MI	185	+6 Laps
3	LMP1	21	(United Kingdom) Strakka Racing	(United Kingdom) Jonny Kane (United Kingdom) Danny Watts (United Kingdom) Nick Leventis	Honda LM-V8 3.4 L V8	MI	185	+6 Laps
4	LMP1	12	(Switzerland) Rebellion Racing	(France) Nicolas Prost (Switzerland) Neel Jani	Lola B12/60	MI	184	+7 Laps
4	LMP1	12	(Switzerland) Rebellion Racing	(France) Nicolas Prost (Switzerland) Neel Jani	Toyota RV8KLM 3.4 L V8	MI	184	+7 Laps
5	LMP1	13	(Switzerland) Rebellion Racing	(Switzerland) Harold Primat (Italy) Andrea Belicchi	Lola B12/60	MI	181	+10 Laps
5	LMP1	13	(Switzerland) Rebellion Racing	(Switzerland) Harold Primat (Italy) Andrea Belicchi	Toyota RV8KLM 3.4 L V8	MI	181	+10 Laps
6	**LMP2**	**49**	**(Argentina) Pecom Racing**	**(Germany) Pierre Kaffer (France) Nicolas Minassian (Argentina) Luís Pérez Companc**	**Oreca 03**	D	**179**	**+12 Laps**
6	**LMP2**	**49**	**(Argentina) Pecom Racing**	**(Germany) Pierre Kaffer (France) Nicolas Minassian (Argentina) Luís Pérez Companc**	**Nissan VK45DE 4.5 L V8**	D	**179**	**+12 Laps**
7	LMP2	23	(France) Signatech-Nissan	(France) Jordan Tresson (France) Olivier Lombard (France) Franck Mailleux	Oreca 03	D	177	+14 Laps
7	LMP2	23	(France) Signatech-Nissan	(France) Jordan Tresson (France) Olivier Lombard (France) Franck Mailleux	Nissan VK45DE 4.5 L V8	D	177	+14 Laps
8	LMP2	44	(United States) Starworks Motorsport	(France) Stéphane Sarrazin (United Kingdom) Tom Kimber-Smith (Venezuela) Enzo Potolicchio	HPD ARX-03b	D	177	+14 Laps
8	LMP2	44	(United States) Starworks Motorsport	(France) Stéphane Sarrazin (United Kingdom) Tom Kimber-Smith (Venezuela) Enzo Potolicchio	Honda HR28TT 2.8 L Turbo V6	D	177	+14 Laps
9	LMP2	32	(Germany) Lotus	(United States) Kevin Weeda (United Kingdom) James Rossiter (Italy) Vitantonio Liuzzi	Lola B12/80	D	177	+14 Laps
9	LMP2	32	(Germany) Lotus	(United States) Kevin Weeda (United Kingdom) James Rossiter (Italy) Vitantonio Liuzzi	Lotus 3.6 L V8	D	177	+14 Laps
10	LMP2	26	(France) Signatech-Nissan	(France) Pierre Ragues (Russia) Roman Rusinov (France) Nelson Panciatici	Oreca 03	D	176	+15 Laps
10	LMP2	26	(France) Signatech-Nissan	(France) Pierre Ragues (Russia) Roman Rusinov (France) Nelson Panciatici	Nissan VK45DE 4.5 L V8	D	176	+15 Laps
11	LMP2	24	(France) OAK Racing	(France) Olivier Pla (France) Matthieu Lahaye (France) Jacques Nicolet	Morgan LMP2	D	172	+19 Laps
11	LMP2	24	(France) OAK Racing	(France) Olivier Pla (France) Matthieu Lahaye (France) Jacques Nicolet	Nissan VK45DE 4.5 L V8	D	172	+19 Laps
12	LMP2	41	(United Kingdom) Greaves Motorsport	(Ecuador) Elton Julian (Mexico) Ricardo González (Germany) Christian Zugel	Zytek Z11SN	D	170	+21 Laps
12	LMP2	41	(United Kingdom) Greaves Motorsport	(Ecuador) Elton Julian (Mexico) Ricardo González (Germany) Christian Zugel	Nissan VK45DE 4.5 L V8	D	170	+21 Laps
13	**LMGTE; Pro**	**51**	**(Italy) AF Corse**	**(Finland) Toni Vilander (Italy) Giancarlo Fisichella**	**Ferrari 458 Italia GT2**	MI	**170**	**+21 Laps**
13	**LMGTE; Pro**	**51**	**(Italy) AF Corse**	**(Finland) Toni Vilander (Italy) Giancarlo Fisichella**	**Ferrari F136 4.5 L V8**	MI	**170**	**+21 Laps**
14	LMGTE; Pro	97	(United Kingdom) Aston Martin Racing	(United Kingdom) Darren Turner (Germany) Stefan Mücke	Aston Martin Vantage GTE	MI	169	+22 Laps
14	LMGTE; Pro	97	(United Kingdom) Aston Martin Racing	(United Kingdom) Darren Turner (Germany) Stefan Mücke	Aston Martin AM05 4.5 L V8	MI	169	+22 Laps
15	LMGTE; Pro	77	(Germany) Team Felbermayr-Proton	(Austria) Richard Lietz (Germany) Marc Lieb	Porsche 997 GT3-RSR	MI	169	+22 Laps
15	LMGTE; Pro	77	(Germany) Team Felbermayr-Proton	(Austria) Richard Lietz (Germany) Marc Lieb	Porsche M97/74 4.0 L Flat-6	MI	169	+22 Laps
16	LMGTE; Pro	71	(Italy) AF Corse	(Monaco) Olivier Beretta^{1} (Italy) Andrea Bertolini	Ferrari 458 Italia GT2	MI	169	+22 Laps
16	LMGTE; Pro	71	(Italy) AF Corse	(Monaco) Olivier Beretta^{1} (Italy) Andrea Bertolini	Ferrari F136 4.5 L V8	MI	169	+22 Laps
17	**LMGTE; Am**	**88**	**(Germany) Team Felbermayr-Proton**	**(Germany) Christian Ried (Italy) Gianluca Roda (Italy) Paolo Ruberti**	**Porsche 997 GT3-RSR**	MI	**165**	**+26 Laps**
17	**LMGTE; Am**	**88**	**(Germany) Team Felbermayr-Proton**	**(Germany) Christian Ried (Italy) Gianluca Roda (Italy) Paolo Ruberti**	**Porsche M97/74 4.0 L Flat-6**	MI	**165**	**+26 Laps**
18	LMGTE; Am	61	(Italy) AF Corse-Waltrip	(United States) Robert Kauffman (United States) Brian Vickers (Portugal) Rui Águas	Ferrari 458 Italia GT2	MI	164	+27 Laps
18	LMGTE; Am	61	(Italy) AF Corse-Waltrip	(United States) Robert Kauffman (United States) Brian Vickers (Portugal) Rui Águas	Ferrari F136 4.5 L V8	MI	164	+27 Laps
19	LMGTE; Am	57	(United States) Krohn Racing	(United States) Tracy Krohn (Sweden) Niclas Jönsson (Italy) Michele Rugolo	Ferrari 458 Italia GT2	MI	162	+29 Laps
19	LMGTE; Am	57	(United States) Krohn Racing	(United States) Tracy Krohn (Sweden) Niclas Jönsson (Italy) Michele Rugolo	Ferrari F136 4.5 L V8	MI	162	+29 Laps
20	LMP2	25	(United Kingdom) ADR-Delta	(Thailand) Tor Graves (Australia) John Martin	Oreca 03	D	161	+30 Laps
20	LMP2	25	(United Kingdom) ADR-Delta	(Thailand) Tor Graves (Australia) John Martin	Nissan VK45DE 4.5 L V8	D	161	+30 Laps
21	LMGTE; Am	50	(France) Larbre Compétition	(France) Patrick Bornhauser (France) Julien Canal (Brazil) Fernando Rees	Chevrolet Corvette C6.R	MI	157	+34 Laps
21	LMGTE; Am	50	(France) Larbre Compétition	(France) Patrick Bornhauser (France) Julien Canal (Brazil) Fernando Rees	Chevrolet LS5.5R 5.5 L V8	MI	157	+34 Laps
22	LMGTE; Am	70	(France) Larbre Compétition	(France) Jean-Philippe Belloc (France) Christophe Bourret (France) Pascal Gibon	Chevrolet Corvette C6.R	MI	153	+38 Laps
22	LMGTE; Am	70	(France) Larbre Compétition	(France) Jean-Philippe Belloc (France) Christophe Bourret (France) Pascal Gibon	Chevrolet LS5.5R 5.5 L V8	MI	153	+38 Laps
23	LMGTE; Am	55	(United Kingdom) JWA-Avila	(Switzerland) Joël Camathias (Denmark) Benny Simonsen (United Kingdom) Paul Daniels	Porsche 997 GT3-RSR	P	150	+41 Laps
23	LMGTE; Am	55	(United Kingdom) JWA-Avila	(Switzerland) Joël Camathias (Denmark) Benny Simonsen (United Kingdom) Paul Daniels	Porsche M97/74 4.0 L Flat-6	P	150	+41 Laps
DNF	LMP1	7	(Japan) Toyota Racing	(Austria) Alexander Wurz (France) Nicolas Lapierre	Toyota TS030 Hybrid	MI	144	Did Not Finish
DNF	LMP1	7	(Japan) Toyota Racing	(Austria) Alexander Wurz (France) Nicolas Lapierre	Toyota RV8KLM 3.4 L V8 (Hybrid)	MI	144	Did Not Finish
DNF	LMP2	31	(Germany) Lotus	(Italy) Luca Moro (Germany) Thomas Holzer	Lola B12/80	D	103	Did Not Finish
DNF	LMP2	31	(Germany) Lotus	(Italy) Luca Moro (Germany) Thomas Holzer	Lotus 3.6 L V8	D	103	Did Not Finish
DNF	LMP2	29	(United Arab Emirates) Gulf Racing Middle East	(Switzerland) Jean-Denis Délétraz (Japan) Keiko Ihara (France) Fabien Giroix	Lola B12/80	D	97	Did Not Finish
DNF	LMP2	29	(United Arab Emirates) Gulf Racing Middle East	(Switzerland) Jean-Denis Délétraz (Japan) Keiko Ihara (France) Fabien Giroix	Nissan VK45DE 4.5 L V8	D	97	Did Not Finish
DNF	LMP1	22	(United Kingdom) JRM	(United Kingdom) Peter Dumbreck (India) Karun Chandhok (Australia) David Brabham	HPD ARX-03a	MI	61	Did Not Finish
DNF	LMP1	22	(United Kingdom) JRM	(United Kingdom) Peter Dumbreck (India) Karun Chandhok (Australia) David Brabham	Honda LM-V8 3.4 L V8	MI	61	Did Not Finish
DNF	LMP2	35	(France) OAK Racing	(United Kingdom) Alex Brundle (Austria) Dominik Kraihamer (Belgium) Bertrand Baguette	Morgan LMP2	D	14	Did Not Finish
DNF	LMP2	35	(France) OAK Racing	(United Kingdom) Alex Brundle (Austria) Dominik Kraihamer (Belgium) Bertrand Baguette	Nissan VK45DE 4.5 L V8	D	14	Did Not Finish

Tyre manufacturers
Key
Symbol	Tyre manufacturer
**D**	Dunlop
**MI**	Michelin
**P**	Pirelli

- **^1** Olivier Beretta was excluded from the race by the stewards for making avoidable contact. The No. 71 Ferrari's result was not affected.

FIA World Endurance Championship
Previous race: 6 Hours of São Paulo	2012 season	Next race: 6 Hours of Fuji
