= Jordan Tresson =

French racing driver

- Nationality: (France) French
- Born: April 30, 1988 (age 38) Villers-la-Montagne

FIA World Endurance Championship career
- Debut season: 2012
- Current team: Signatech-Nissan
- Categorisation: FIA Silver
- Car number: 23

Previous series
- 2011 2010: Blancpain Endurance Series; GT4 European Cup

Jordan Tresson (born 30 April 1988 in Villers-la-Montagne) is a French racing driver, who previously raced in the FIA World Endurance Championship.

== Career ==
In April 2010, Tresson won the Gran Turismo Academy, a competition run by Nissan and Sony Computer Entertainment that gives gamers the chance to become real racing drivers. Tresson immediately began racing in that year's GT4 European Cup in a Nissan 370Z run by RJN Motorsport. He finished the season tied for fourth place in the drivers' standings with 2009 GT Academy winner and RJN teammate Lucas Ordoñez, even though the pair never actually shared a car all season.

In 2011, Tresson competed in the Blancpain Endurance Series in the GT4 class, again in an RJN Nissan 370Z and sharing with British drivers Alex Buncombe and Christopher Ward. The trio scored two class wins from five races to win the title.

2012 saw Tresson step up to prototype racing, taking part in the FIA World Endurance Championship in a Signatech-Nissan LMP2 car. Consistently average performances by the team saw his two co drivers released and himself shelved for the majority of 2013, till he too was released by Nissan. When asked about this in an interview he said he had 'heard the news via a press release. A process devoid of etiquette'. Jordan would go on to state that he is ready to draw a line under his motorsport career.

=== 24 Hours of Le Mans results ===
Year	Team	Co-Drivers	Car	Class	Laps	Pos.	Class Pos.
2012	(France) Signatech-Nissan	(France) Franck Mailleux (France) Olivier Lombard	Oreca 03-Nissan	LMP2	340	16th	9th

=== Complete FIA World Endurance Championship results ===
Year	Entrant	Class	Chassis	Engine	1	2	3	4	5	6	7	8	Rank	Points
2012	Signatech-Nissan	LMP2	Oreca 03-Nissan	Nissan 3.4 L V8	SEB; Ret	SPA; 24	LMN; 16	SIL; Ret	SAO; Ret	BHR; 2	FUJ; 8	SHA; 5	32nd	8.5
