= Strakka Racing =

Auto racing team based in the United Kingdom

(United Kingdom) Strakka Racing
- Founded: 2007
- Folded: 2020
- Base: Silverstone, England
- Team principal(s): Nick Leventis
- Former series: Britcar; Ferrari Challenge; Le Mans Series; FIA WEC; Formula V8 3.5; Renault Sport Trophy; Eurocup Formula Renault 2.0; Formula Renault 2.0 NEC; Blancpain GT Series Endurance Cup; Intercontinental GT Challenge
- Website: http://www.strakkaracing.com/

Strakka Racing was a British auto racing team founded by Nick Leventis. The team was based at the Silverstone Circuit in Northamptonshire. The team made history at the 2010 1000 km of Hungaroring when they became the first team in Le Mans Series history to win overall in an LMP2 class car. They also became the first team in LMS history to take overall pole position in an LMP2 class car.

== History ==
=== 2007 – Beginnings ===
The team was founded by Peter Hardman in 2007 to provide a platform for Nick Leventis to compete in contemporary GT racing. They entered an ex-works BMW M3 GTR in the Britcar series. Leventis was accompanied by Peter Hardman during the season. Leventis also competed in classic sports car races in a Ferrari 330 P3.

=== 2008 ===
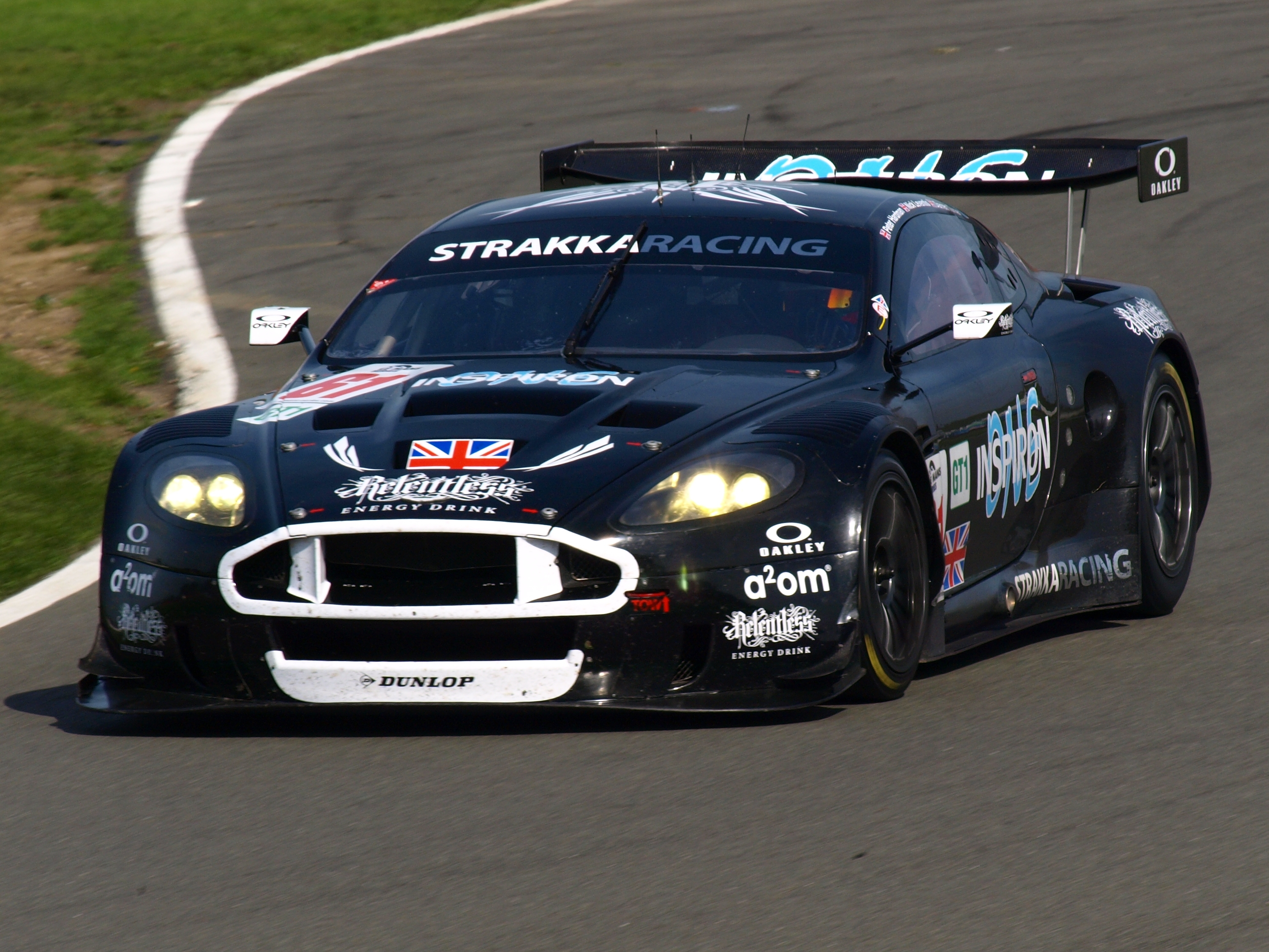
Strakka's Aston Martin DBR9 competing at the 2008 1000 km of Silverstone

In 2008, the team entered the Le Mans Series with an Aston Martin DBR9 in the GT1 class. The team made its début at the 1000 km of Spa with Nick Leventis and Peter Hardman partnering up. They finished 24th overall and fourth in class.

They also entered the 24 Hours of Le Mans with the help of Vitaphone Racing Team. The Vitaphone team was not allowed to race their Maserati MC12 as it did not pass the ACO's technical regulations so they raced the DBR9 along with Strakka during Le Mans. Leventis and Hardman shared the car with Alexandre Negrão. The car retired with prop shaft failure after 82 laps around the Circuit de la Sarthe.

The team went on to compete at the 1000 km of Silverstone where the team is based. For the race, Leventis and Hardman were joined by Aston Martin works driver Darren Turner. The outcome was the same as the event at Spa; Strakka once again finished in 24th overall and 4th in class.

The team still raced in a few Britcar events and competed at the Britcar 24 Hours in Class 2 with their BMW. The usual drivers, Leventis and Hardman, were joined by Allan Simonsen and Christian Vann. They finished 13th overall.

=== 2009 ===
The 2009 season saw Strakka compete in every round of the Le Mans Series season. The team replaced the DBR9 with a new Ginetta-Zytek GZ09S to compete in the LMP1 class. The team signed new driver Danny Watts to race alongside Leventis and Hardman. The first event of the season was the 1000 km of Catalunya and saw Strakka take pole position in the brand new car, qualifying half a second quicker than the fastest of Aston Martin Racing's brand new prototypes. Not a great start from Hardman meant the two Lola-Aston Martin's overtook into turn 1. After a good and eventful race, the drivers managed to finish fifth overall and in class.

At the following race, they produced the slowest time of any car in qualifying but managed to finish 17th overall and 12th in class at the 1000 km of Spa.

A month later, the team competed at the 24 Hours of Le Mans finishing 21st overall and 14th in class. Following the Le Mans 24 hours, Hardman decided to stepped down from both driving and his team principal role and sold his interest in Strakka Racing to Leventis. At the 1000 km of Algarve, the car retired after just 67 laps around the brand new Algarve circuit.

The 1000 km of Nürburgring saw the team qualifying fourth and the Ginetta-Zytek was still running with an hour and a half left, and 141 laps completed when Danny Watts crashed into a barrier to avoid colliding with a slower GT2 car. At the 1000 km of Silverstone the team were unable to participate in qualifying meaning the car had to start from the back of the grid. Leventis and Watts finished ninth overall and eighth in class.

2009 was also the last time the team raced in Ferrari Challenge.

=== 2010 ===
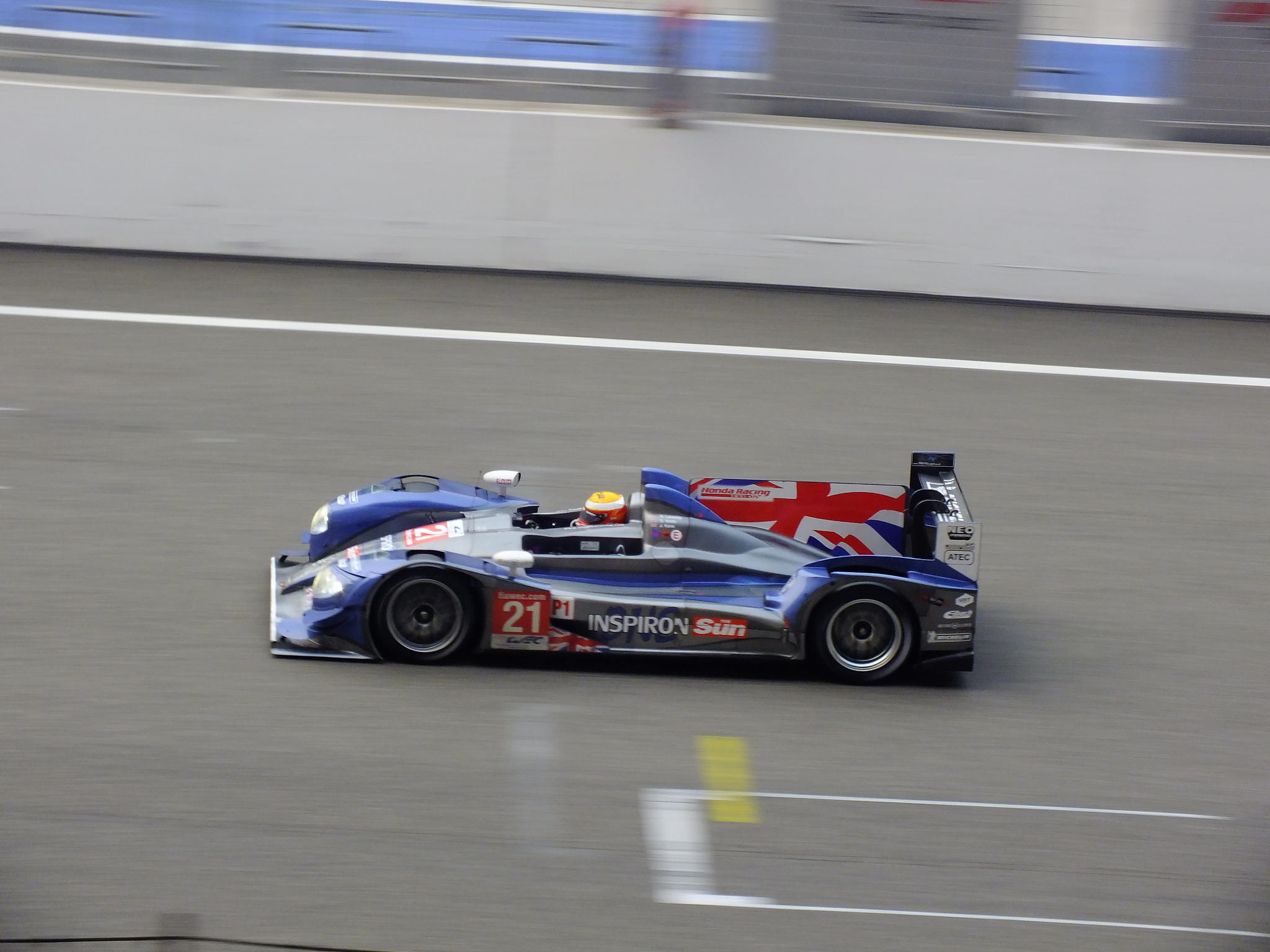
Strakka Racing HPD ARX-03a-Honda at the 2012 6 Hours of Shanghai

In 2010, the team focused on the Le Mans Series running a HPD ARX-01C, which is an updated version of Acura's LMP2 car that was successful in the American Le Mans Series. Peter Hardman left the team but Jonny Kane was signed in time for the first round, the 8 Hours of Le Castellet. Watts took LMP2 pole, setting a time of just over two seconds faster than the next nearest LMP2 car. Strakka went on to win the LMP2 class finishing 35 seconds ahead of the LMP2 pack.

The team went on to pick up its 2nd consecutive pole at the 1000 km of Spa. However, transmission failure forced the team to retire after 69 laps.

At Le Mans, the team secured pole position in LMP2, one second ahead of the Patrón Highcroft Racing team with the same HPD ARX prototype which Highcroft has been developing with Acura/HPD for three years. The driver lineup of Leventis, Watts, and Kane completed 367 laps and took the LMP2 class victory, as well as fifth place overall. It was clear that the HPD ARX-01C was the dominant car as Strakka and Highcroft were for a long time battling themselves for LMP2 lead, but the Highcroft car suffered mechanical problems resulting in Strakka finishing six laps ahead of the next nearest LMP2 class finisher, the OAK Racing entry.

Strakka secured its 4th consecutive pole at the 1000 km of Algarve with Watts qualifying 0.6 seconds faster than the other LMP2 cars. Transmission failure caused the car to halt just after completing 120 laps.

The 1000 km of Hungaroring was the first event of its type to be held at the Hungaroring. The tight, technical track favoured the LMP2 cars who were quick in free practice and qualifying as Watts proved by putting the HPD on the overall pole, the first time in Le Mans Series history for an LMP2 car. Watts qualified nearly half a second quicker than the fastest LMP1 car. The power of the LMP1 cars, however, was too much to cope at the start of the race, especially the Peugeot 908 diesel car entered by Oreca. However during the race, the Oreca Peugeot developed mechanical problems and the Rebellion entries spun out. Strakka overtook the Oreca Peugeot whilst it was in the pits and went on to win overall, the first time in LMS history that an LMP2 car had won outright. The LMP1 winning car finished seventh overall, the top six finishers being LMP2 entries.

=== FIA World Endurance Championship ===
Strakka joined the 2012 FIA World Endurance Championship with a LMP1 class HPD ARX-03a with drivers Jonny Kane, Danny Watts and Leventis. The team finished third overall in Bahrain and was runner-up in the privateer LMP1 Trophy behind Rebellion Racing. In 2013, the trio drove a LMP1 class HPD ARX-03c at the FIA WEC. They retired at Silverstone, and finish seventh at Spa-Francorchamps and sixth at the Le Mans. The team did not return for the rest of the season.

The team developed a LMP2 car in partnership with Japanese manufacturer Dome, but the team did not enter any race in 2014. They debuted the Strakka Dome S103 at the 2015 6 Hours of Silverstone, claiming a third place, after which they switched to a Gibson-Nissan, finishing sixth in the LMP2 teams championship. In 2016, Kane and Leventis were co-driven by Danny Watts in the first three races and Lewis Williamson for the next four races. They did not claim any podium, and missed the final two rounds, ranking seventh in the LMP2 teams' standings.

=== Blancpain GT Series ===
In 2017, Strakka joined the Blancpain GT Series to enter four McLaren 650S GT3 with factory support team.

In 2018, Strakka Racing expanded its GT activities beyond Europe, forming a new partnership with Mercedes-AMG which saw the team carry Performance Team status for the German marque. The Silverstone-based ran three new Mercedes-AMG GT3s in the Intercontinental GT Challenge alongside the Blancpain GT Series Endurance Cup.

=== 2019 ===
In 2019, Strakka Racing continued its GT program in the Intercontinental GT Challenge and Blancpain GT Series Endurance Cup.

On the 24th of July, it was revealed that team principal and team racing driver team Nick Leventis had tested positive for banned substances. He was thus banned for four years. Following this incident he announced his retirement from motorsports.

=== 2020 ===
In February 2020, it was confirmed by specialist media that the team had shut down permanently, without any formal announcement to that effect.

In September 2020, it was announced that all of the team's assets, which included all of their race team equipment, race cars, trucks and their race team premises close to Silverstone Circuit, were sold to United Autosports for an undisclosed sum.

== Drivers ==
(United Kingdom) Nick Leventis (2007–2019)
(United Kingdom) Peter Hardman (2007–2009)
(Brazil) Alexandre Negrão (2008)
(United Kingdom) Darren Turner (2008)
(United Kingdom) Danny Watts (2009–2016)
(United Kingdom) Jonny Kane (2010–2016)
(United Kingdom) Lewis Williamson (2016–2019)

== Racing record ==
=== 24 Hours of Le Mans results ===
Year	Entrant	No.	Car	Drivers	Class	Laps	Pos.	Class Pos.
2008	(Germany) Vitaphone Racing Team (United Kingdom) Strakka Racing	53	Aston Martin DBR9	(United Kingdom) Peter Hardman (United Kingdom) Nick Leventis (Brazil) Alexandre Negrão	GT1	82	DNF	DNF
2009	(United Kingdom) Strakka Racing	23	Ginetta-Zytek GZ09S	(United Kingdom) Peter Hardman (United Kingdom) Nick Leventis (United Kingdom) Danny Watts	LMP1	325	21st	14th
2010	(United Kingdom) Strakka Racing	42	HPD ARX-01C	(United Kingdom) Jonny Kane (United Kingdom) Nick Leventis (United Kingdom) Danny Watts	LMP2	367	5th	1st
2011	(United Kingdom) Strakka Racing	42	HPD ARX-01d	(United Kingdom) Jonny Kane (United Kingdom) Nick Leventis (United Kingdom) Danny Watts	LMP2	144	DNF	DNF
2012	(United Kingdom) Strakka Racing	21	HPD ARX-03a	(United Kingdom) Jonny Kane (United Kingdom) Nick Leventis (United Kingdom) Danny Watts	LMP1	303	30th	8th
2013	(United Kingdom) Strakka Racing	21	HPD ARX-03c	(United Kingdom) Jonny Kane (United Kingdom) Nick Leventis (United Kingdom) Danny Watts	LMP1	332	6th	6th
2015	(United Kingdom) Strakka Racing	42	Strakka-Dome S103-Nissan	(United Kingdom) Jonny Kane (United Kingdom) Nick Leventis (United Kingdom) Danny Watts	LMP2	264	DNF	DNF
2016	(United Kingdom) Strakka Racing	42	Gibson 015S-Nissan	(United Kingdom) Jonny Kane (United Kingdom) Nick Leventis (United Kingdom) Danny Watts	LMP2	351	8th	4th
