= 2010 1000 km of Hungaroring =

Layout of the Hungaroring

The 2010 1000 km of Hungaroring was the fourth round of the 2010 Le Mans Series season. It took place at the Hungaroring, Hungary on 22 August 2010. It was the first time a Le Mans Series event took place at the Hungarian track.

The race was also the first time an LMP2 class car has taken first, both in qualifying and the race. The No. 42 Strakka Racing HPD ARX-01C achieved such feat, with LMP2 cars running comparatively in lap times in the practice sessions, qualifying, and the race, sweeping the top six positions in the race overall, while most of the LMP1 cars suffered from reliability issues and/or driver errors throughout the day-to-night race; the best finisher was the No. 5 Beechdean Mansell Ginetta-Zytek.

== Qualifying ==
For the first time in history, an LMP2 car took overall pole in a Le Mans Series event. Strakka Racing were the team that achieved such feat, qualifying 0.4 seconds ahead of the quickest LMP1 car, the No. 13 Rebellion Lola. The No. 49 Applewood Seven took their consecutive FLM pole, while the No. 50 Larbre Compétition took the GT1 pole being the one of only two cars in the class that ran in qualifying, and the No. 96 AF Corse took its consecutive GT2 pole.

=== Qualifying result ===
Pole position winners in each class are marked in bold.

Pos	Class	Team	Driver	Lap Time	Grid
1	**LMP2**	**No. 42 Strakka Racing**	**Danny Watts**	**1:32.431**	**1**
2	**LMP1**	**No. 13 Rebellion Racing**	**Jean-Christophe Boullion**	**1:32.888**	**2**
3	LMP1	No. 12 Rebellion Racing	Neel Jani	1:32.924	3
4	LMP1	No. 4 Team Oreca Matmut	Olivier Panis	1:33.613	4
5	LMP1	No. 008 Signature Plus	Pierre Ragues	1:35.297	5
6	LMP1	No. 5 Beechdean-Mansell	Greg Mansell	1:35.441	6
7	LMP2	No. 40 Quifel ASM Team	Olivier Pla	1:35.586	7
8	LMP2	No. 35 OAK Racing	Guillaume Moreau	1:35.873	8
9	LMP2	No. 24 OAK Racing	Matthieu Lahaye	1:36.024	9
10	LMP2	No. 25 RML	Thomas Erdos	1:36.250	10
11	LMP2	No. 30 Racing Box	Federico Leo	1:36.660	11
12	LMP2	No. 41 Team Bruichladdich	Thor-Christian Ebbesvik	1:37.256	12
13	LMP2	No. 31 RLR msport	Warren Hughes	1:37.796	13
14	LMP2	No. 29 Racing Box	Marco Cioci	1:38.307	14
15	LMP2	No. 27 Race Performance	Chris Buncombe	1:40.988	15
16	**FLM**	**No. 49 Applewood Seven**	**Mathias Beche**	**1:41.987**	**16**
17	FLM	No. 44 DAMS	Darren Manning	1:42.213	17
18	FLM	No. 48 Hope Polevision Racing	Nico Verdonck	1:42.253	18
19	FLM	No. 47 Hope Polevision Racing	Steve Zacchia	1:42.461	19
20	FLM	No. 43 DAMS	Alessandro Cicognani	1:42.814	20
21	FLM	No. 45 Boutsen Energy Racing	Nicolas de Crem	1:43.223	21
22	LMP2	No. 36 Pegasus Racing	Julien Schell	1:45.105	22
23	**GT2**	**No. 96 AF Corse**	**Álvaro Parente**	**1:46.535**	**23**
24	GT2	No. 95 AF Corse	Giancarlo Fisichella	1:46.684	24
25	GT2	No. 91 CRS Racing	Andrew Kirkaldy	1:46.950	25
26	**GT1**	**No. 50 Larbre Compétition**	**Gabriele Gardel**	**1:47.005**	**26**
27	GT2	No. 94 AF Corse	Matías Russo	1:47.157	27
28	GT2	No. 92 JMW Motorsport	Darren Turner	1:47.226	28
29	GT2	No. 89 Hankook Team Farnbacher	Dominik Farnbacher	1:47.369	29
30	GT2	No. 75 Prospeed Competition	Richard Westbrook	1:47.518	30
31	GT2	No. 77 Team Felbermayr-Proton	Richard Lietz	1:47.526	31
32	GT2	No. 76 IMSA Performance Matmut	Patrick Pilet	1:47.551	32
33	GT2	No. 88 Team Felbermayr-Proton	Romain Dumas	1:47.705	33
34	GT2	No. 85 Spyker Squadron	Tom Coronel	1:47.800	34
35	GT2	No. 90 CRS Racing	Phil Quaife	1:48.039	35
36	FLM	No. 46 JMB Racing	Peter Kutemann	1:48.766	36
37	GT2	No. 86 Team Felbermayr-Proton	Marco Seefried	1:49.977	37
38	GT1	No. 66 Atlas FX-Team FS	No Time		38

== Race ==
The race was scheduled to run for 229 laps; however, the six-hour time limit went in force; the winning No. 42 Strakka HPD ran 206 laps at the end of the race.

=== Race result ===
Class winners in bold. Cars failing to complete 70% of winner's distance marked as Not Classified (NC).

Pos	Class	No	Team	Drivers	Chassis	Tyre	Laps
Pos	Class	No	Team	Drivers	Engine	Tyre	Laps
1	**LMP2**	**42**	**(United Kingdom) Strakka Racing**	**(United Kingdom) Nick Leventis (United Kingdom) Danny Watts (United Kingdom) Jonny Kane**	**HPD ARX-01C**	MI	**206**
1	**LMP2**	**42**	**(United Kingdom) Strakka Racing**	**(United Kingdom) Nick Leventis (United Kingdom) Danny Watts (United Kingdom) Jonny Kane**	**HPD AL7.R 3.4 L V8**	MI	**206**
2	LMP2	40	(Portugal) Quifel ASM Team	(Portugal) Miguel Amaral (France) Olivier Pla	Ginetta-Zytek GZ09S/2	D	205
2	LMP2	40	(Portugal) Quifel ASM Team	(Portugal) Miguel Amaral (France) Olivier Pla	Zytek ZG348 3.4 L V8	D	205
3	LMP2	24	OAK Racing; Team Mazda France	(France) Matthieu Lahaye (France) Jacques Nicolet	Pescarolo 01 Evo	D	204
3	LMP2	24	OAK Racing; Team Mazda France	(France) Matthieu Lahaye (France) Jacques Nicolet	Judd DB 3.4 L V8	D	204
4	LMP2	25	(United Kingdom) RML	(Brazil) Thomas Erdos (United Kingdom) Mike Newton (United Kingdom) Ben Collins	Lola B08/80	D	202
4	LMP2	25	(United Kingdom) RML	(Brazil) Thomas Erdos (United Kingdom) Mike Newton (United Kingdom) Ben Collins	HPD AL7.R 3.4 L V8	D	202
5	LMP2	41	(United Kingdom) Team Bruichladdich	(Saudi Arabia) Karim Ojjeh (United Kingdom) Tim Greaves (Norway) Thor-Christian Ebbesvik	Ginetta-Zytek GZ09S/2	D	201
5	LMP2	41	(United Kingdom) Team Bruichladdich	(Saudi Arabia) Karim Ojjeh (United Kingdom) Tim Greaves (Norway) Thor-Christian Ebbesvik	Zytek ZG348 3.4 L V8	D	201
6	LMP2	29	(Italy) Racing Box (Italy) MIK Racing	(Italy) Luca Pirri (Italy) Marco Cioci (Italy) Piergiuseppe Perazzini	Lola B09/80	P	200
6	LMP2	29	(Italy) Racing Box (Italy) MIK Racing	(Italy) Luca Pirri (Italy) Marco Cioci (Italy) Piergiuseppe Perazzini	Judd DB 3.4 L V8	P	200
7	**LMP1**	**5**	**(United Kingdom) Beechdean-Mansell**	**(United Kingdom) Greg Mansell (United Kingdom) Leo Mansell**	**Ginetta-Zytek GZ09S**	D	**199**
7	**LMP1**	**5**	**(United Kingdom) Beechdean-Mansell**	**(United Kingdom) Greg Mansell (United Kingdom) Leo Mansell**	**Zytek ZJ458 4.5 L V8**	D	**199**
8	LMP1	12	(Switzerland) Rebellion Racing	(France) Nicolas Prost (Switzerland) Neel Jani	Lola B10/60	MI	193
8	LMP1	12	(Switzerland) Rebellion Racing	(France) Nicolas Prost (Switzerland) Neel Jani	Rebellion (Judd) 5.5 L V10	MI	193
9	LMP2	35	OAK Racing; Team Mazda France	(France) Guillaume Moreau (Monaco) Richard Hein	Pescarolo 01 Evo	D	192
9	LMP2	35	OAK Racing; Team Mazda France	(France) Guillaume Moreau (Monaco) Richard Hein	Judd DB 3.4 L V8	D	192
10	**GT2**	**77**	**(Germany) Team Felbermayr-Proton**	**(Germany) Marc Lieb (Austria) Richard Lietz**	**Porsche 997 GT3-RSR**	MI	**192**
10	**GT2**	**77**	**(Germany) Team Felbermayr-Proton**	**(Germany) Marc Lieb (Austria) Richard Lietz**	**Porsche 4.0 L Flat-6**	MI	**192**
11	GT2	91	(United Kingdom) CRS Racing	(United Kingdom) Andrew Kirkaldy (United Kingdom) Tim Mullen	Ferrari F430 GTE	MI	192
11	GT2	91	(United Kingdom) CRS Racing	(United Kingdom) Andrew Kirkaldy (United Kingdom) Tim Mullen	Ferrari 4.0 L V8	MI	192
12	GT2	76	(France) IMSA Performance Matmut	(France) Patrick Pilet (France) Raymond Narac	Porsche 997 GT3-RSR	MI	192
12	GT2	76	(France) IMSA Performance Matmut	(France) Patrick Pilet (France) Raymond Narac	Porsche 4.0 L Flat-6	MI	192
13	GT2	95	(Italy) AF Corse	(France) Jean Alesi (Italy) Giancarlo Fisichella (Finland) Toni Vilander	Ferrari F430 GTE	MI	192
13	GT2	95	(Italy) AF Corse	(France) Jean Alesi (Italy) Giancarlo Fisichella (Finland) Toni Vilander	Ferrari 4.0 L V8	MI	192
14	GT2	96	(Italy) AF Corse	(Spain) Álvaro Barba López (Portugal) Álvaro Parente	Ferrari F430 GTE	MI	191
14	GT2	96	(Italy) AF Corse	(Spain) Álvaro Barba López (Portugal) Álvaro Parente	Ferrari 4.0 L V8	MI	191
15	GT2	92	(United Kingdom) JMW Motorsport	(United Kingdom) Rob Bell (United Kingdom) Darren Turner	Aston Martin V8 Vantage GT2	D	191
15	GT2	92	(United Kingdom) JMW Motorsport	(United Kingdom) Rob Bell (United Kingdom) Darren Turner	Aston Martin 4.5 L V8	D	191
16	GT2	88	(Germany) Team Felbermayr-Proton	(Austria) Martin Ragginger (Germany) Christian Ried (France) Romain Dumas	Porsche 997 GT3-RSR	MI	190
16	GT2	88	(Germany) Team Felbermayr-Proton	(Austria) Martin Ragginger (Germany) Christian Ried (France) Romain Dumas	Porsche 4.0 L Flat-6	MI	190
17	GT2	94	(Italy) AF Corse	(Argentina) Luis Pérez Companc (Argentina) Matías Russo	Ferrari F430 GTE	MI	189
17	GT2	94	(Italy) AF Corse	(Argentina) Luis Pérez Companc (Argentina) Matías Russo	Ferrari 4.0 L V8	MI	189
18	LMP2	31	(United Kingdom) RLR msport	(United Kingdom) Barry Gates (United Kingdom) Rob Garofall (United Kingdom) Warren Hughes	MG-Lola EX265	D	189
18	LMP2	31	(United Kingdom) RLR msport	(United Kingdom) Barry Gates (United Kingdom) Rob Garofall (United Kingdom) Warren Hughes	AER P07 2.0 L Turbo I4	D	189
19	GT2	85	(Netherlands) Spyker Squadron	(United Kingdom) Peter Dumbreck (Netherlands) Tom Coronel	Spyker C8 Laviolette GT2-R	MI	188
19	GT2	85	(Netherlands) Spyker Squadron	(United Kingdom) Peter Dumbreck (Netherlands) Tom Coronel	Audi 4.0 L V8	MI	188
20	GT2	89	(Germany) Hankook Team Farnbacher	(Germany) Dominik Farnbacher (Denmark) Allan Simonsen	Ferrari F430 GTE	HK	188
20	GT2	89	(Germany) Hankook Team Farnbacher	(Germany) Dominik Farnbacher (Denmark) Allan Simonsen	Ferrari 4.0 L V8	HK	188
21	**GT1**	**50**	**(France) Larbre Compétition**	**(France) Gabriele Gardel (France) Patrice Goueslard (Brazil) Fernando Rees**	**Saleen S7-R**	MI	**187**
21	**GT1**	**50**	**(France) Larbre Compétition**	**(France) Gabriele Gardel (France) Patrice Goueslard (Brazil) Fernando Rees**	**Ford 7.0 L V8**	MI	**187**
22	**FLM**	**43**	**(France) DAMS**	**(Belgium) Andrea Barlesi (Italy) Alessandro Cicognani (France) Gary Chalandon**	**Oreca FLM09**	MI	**187**
22	**FLM**	**43**	**(France) DAMS**	**(Belgium) Andrea Barlesi (Italy) Alessandro Cicognani (France) Gary Chalandon**	**Chevrolet LS3 6.2 L V8**	MI	**187**
23	LMP1	008	(France) Signature-Plus	(France) Pierre Ragues (France) Franck Mailleux (Belgium) Vanina Ickx	Lola-Aston Martin B09/60	D	184
23	LMP1	008	(France) Signature-Plus	(France) Pierre Ragues (France) Franck Mailleux (Belgium) Vanina Ickx	Aston Martin AM04 6.0 L V12	D	184
24	LMP2	27	(Switzerland) Race Performance	(Switzerland) Michel Frey (United Kingdom) Chris Buncombe	Radical SR9	D	182
24	LMP2	27	(Switzerland) Race Performance	(Switzerland) Michel Frey (United Kingdom) Chris Buncombe	Judd DB 3.4 L V8	D	182
25	LMP2	30	(Italy) Racing Box (Italy) MIK Racing	(Italy) Ferdinando Geri (Italy) Fabio Babini (Italy) Federico Leo	Lola B09/80	P	179
25	LMP2	30	(Italy) Racing Box (Italy) MIK Racing	(Italy) Ferdinando Geri (Italy) Fabio Babini (Italy) Federico Leo	Judd DB 3.4 L V8	P	179
26	FLM	46	(Monaco) JMB Racing	(Netherlands) Peter Kutemann (Switzerland) Maurice Basso (United Kingdom) John Hartshorne	Oreca FLM09	MI	178
26	FLM	46	(Monaco) JMB Racing	(Netherlands) Peter Kutemann (Switzerland) Maurice Basso (United Kingdom) John Hartshorne	Chevrolet LS3 6.2 L V8	MI	178
27	GT2	86	(Germany) Team Felbermayr-Proton	(Austria) Horst Felbermayr, Sr. (Austria) Horst Felbermayr, Jr. (Germany) Marco Seefried	Porsche 997 GT3-RSR	MI	174
27	GT2	86	(Germany) Team Felbermayr-Proton	(Austria) Horst Felbermayr, Sr. (Austria) Horst Felbermayr, Jr. (Germany) Marco Seefried	Porsche 4.0 L Flat-6	MI	174
28	GT2	90	(United Kingdom) CRS Racing	(Germany) Pierre Ehret (United Kingdom) Phil Quaife	Ferrari F430 GTE	MI	167
28	GT2	90	(United Kingdom) CRS Racing	(Germany) Pierre Ehret (United Kingdom) Phil Quaife	Ferrari 4.0 L V8	MI	167
29	FLM	47	(Switzerland) Hope Polevision Racing	(Switzerland) Steve Zacchia (France) Olivier Lombard (Italy) Luca Moro	Oreca FLM09	MI	156
29	FLM	47	(Switzerland) Hope Polevision Racing	(Switzerland) Steve Zacchia (France) Olivier Lombard (Italy) Luca Moro	Chevrolet LS3 6.2 L V8	MI	156
30	FLM	45	(Belgium) Boutsen Energy Racing	(Austria) Dominik Kraihamer (Belgium) Nicolas de Crem (Belgium) Bernard Delhez	Oreca FLM09	MI	146
30	FLM	45	(Belgium) Boutsen Energy Racing	(Austria) Dominik Kraihamer (Belgium) Nicolas de Crem (Belgium) Bernard Delhez	Chevrolet LS3 6.2 L V8	MI	146
31	LMP1	4	(France) Team Oreca Matmut	(France) Olivier Panis (France) Nicolas Lapierre (France) Stéphane Sarrazin	Peugeot 908 HDi FAP	MI	146
31	LMP1	4	(France) Team Oreca Matmut	(France) Olivier Panis (France) Nicolas Lapierre (France) Stéphane Sarrazin	Peugeot HDi 5.5 L Turbo V12 (Diesel)	MI	146
32 DNF	GT2	75	(Belgium) Prospeed Competition	(United Kingdom) Richard Westbrook (Germany) Marco Holzer	Porsche 997 GT3-RSR	MI	133
32 DNF	GT2	75	(Belgium) Prospeed Competition	(United Kingdom) Richard Westbrook (Germany) Marco Holzer	Porsche 4.0 L Flat-6	MI	133
33 DNF	LMP1	13	(Switzerland) Rebellion Racing	(Italy) Andrea Belicchi (France) Jean-Christophe Boullion	Lola B10/60	MI	124
33 DNF	LMP1	13	(Switzerland) Rebellion Racing	(Italy) Andrea Belicchi (France) Jean-Christophe Boullion	Rebellion (Judd) 5.5 L V10	MI	124
34 DNF	LMP2	36	(France) Pegasus Racing	(France) Julien Schell (France) Frédéric da Rocha	Courage-Oreca LC75	D	77
34 DNF	LMP2	36	(France) Pegasus Racing	(France) Julien Schell (France) Frédéric da Rocha	AER P07 2.0 L Turbo I4	D	77
35 DNF	GT1	66	(Austria) Atlas FX-Team FS	(Netherlands) Carlo van Dam (Belgium) Stéphane Lémeret	Saleen S7-R	MI	68
35 DNF	GT1	66	(Austria) Atlas FX-Team FS	(Netherlands) Carlo van Dam (Belgium) Stéphane Lémeret	Ford 7.0 L V8	MI	68
36 DNF	FLM	49	(France) Applewood Seven	(France) Damien Toulemonde (France) Mathias Beche	Oreca FLM09	MI	35
36 DNF	FLM	49	(France) Applewood Seven	(France) Damien Toulemonde (France) Mathias Beche	Chevrolet LS3 6.2 L V8	MI	35
37 DNF	FLM	44	(France) DAMS	(United Kingdom) Jody Firth (United Kingdom) Darren Manning	Oreca FLM09	MI	20
37 DNF	FLM	44	(France) DAMS	(United Kingdom) Jody Firth (United Kingdom) Darren Manning	Chevrolet LS3 6.2 L V8	MI	20

Le Mans Series
Previous race: 1000 km of Algarve	2010 season	Next race: 1000 km of Silverstone
