= 2010 1000 km of Spa =

The Circuit de Spa-Francorchamps

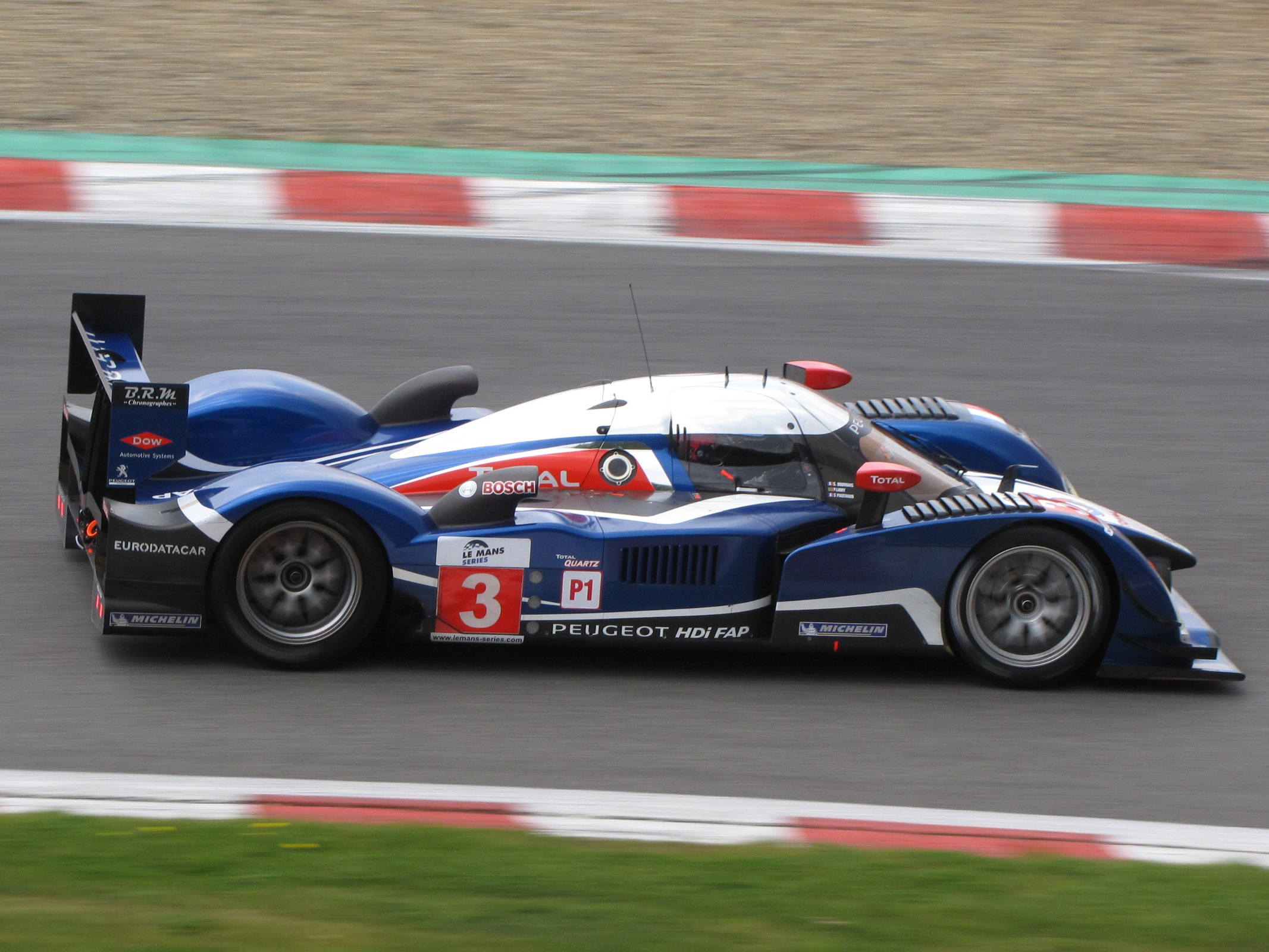
Pedro Lamy, Sébastien Bourdais and Simon Pagenaud claimed victory in the No. 3 Peugeot 908 HDi FAP.

The 2010 1000 km of Spa was the second round of the 2010 Le Mans Series season. It took place at the Circuit de Spa-Francorchamps on 9 May 2010.

== Qualifying ==
Qualifying saw Peugeot take pole position in their first and only race of the season, beating Audi Sport North America by 0.6 seconds. Strakka Racing once again took pole in the LMP2 class. They qualified 2.5 seconds quicker than the next nearest LMP2 car, the RML Lola-HPD. Hope Polevision Racing took the Formula Le Mans pole beating Boutsen Energy Racing by 0.5 seconds. Marc VDS took the GT1 pole in their first Le Mans Series event, racing a Ford GT they also use in the 2010 FIA GT1 World Championship season. They qualified 1.5 seconds ahead of the next nearest GT1 car, a Ford GT also used by fellow GT1 World Championship contenders and LMS débutants Matech Competition. AF Corse once again took the GT2 pole but only by 0.08 seconds over Team Felbermayr-Proton.

=== Qualifying result ===
Pole position winners in each class are marked in bold.

Pos	Class	Team	Driver	Lap Time	Grid
1	**LMP1**	**No. 3 Team Peugeot Total**	**Sébastien Bourdais**	**1:57.884**	**1**
2	LMP1	No. 9 Audi Sport North America	Timo Bernhard	1:58.519	2
3	LMP1	No. 2 Team Peugeot Total	Stéphane Sarrazin	1:59.421	3
4	LMP1	No. 4 Team Oreca Matmut	Nicolas Lapierre	1:59.623	4
5	LMP1	No. 8 Audi Sport Team Joest	André Lotterer	1:59.707	5
6	LMP1	No. 7 Audi Sport Team Joest	Tom Kristensen	1:59.795	6
7	LMP1	No. 1 Team Peugeot Total	Alexander Wurz	1:59.989	7
8	LMP1	No. 008 Signature-Plus	Franck Mailleux	2:02.413	8
9	LMP1	No. 12 Rebellion Racing	Nicolas Prost	2:02.845	9
10	**LMP2**	**No. 42 Strakka Racing**	**Danny Watts**	**2:03.135**	**10**
11	LMP1	No. 13 Rebellion Racing	Jean-Christophe Boullion	2:03.143	11
12	LMP2	No. 25 RML	Thomas Erdos	2:05.681	12
13	LMP2	No. 24 OAK Racing	Matthieu Lahaye	2:07.159	13
14	LMP2	No. 40 Quifel-ASM Team	Olivier Pla	2:07.342	14
15	LMP2	No. 29 Racing Box	Filippo Francioni	2:08.309	15
16	LMP2	No. 30 Racing Box	Giacomo Piccini	2:08.398	16
17	LMP2	No. 35 OAK Racing	Guillaume Moreau	2:09.104	17
18	LMP2	No. 39 KSM	Jonathan Kennard	2:09.795	18
19	**FLM**	**No. 48 Hope Polevision Racing**	**Nico Verdonck**	**2:13.743**	**19**
20	LMP2	No. 27 Race Performance	Ralph Meichtry	2:13.912	20
21	FLM	No. 45 Boutsen Energy Racing	Nicolas de Crem	2:14.278	21
22	FLM	No. 49 Applewood Seven	David Zollinger	2:14.284	22
23	FLM	No. 47 Hope Polevision Racing	Wolfgang Kaufmann	2:15.611	23
24	LMP2	No. 36 Pegasus Racing	Julien Schell	2:16.832	24
25	**GT1**	**No. 70 Marc VDS Racing Team**	**Bas Leinders**	**2:17.316**	**25**
26	FLM	No. 43 DAMS	Gary Chalandon	2:17.345	25
27	GT1	No. 60 Matech Competition	Thomas Mutsch	2:18.730	27
28	GT1	No. 72 Luc Alphand Aventures	Julien Jousse	2:19.377	28
29	GT1	No. 52 Young Driver AMR	Christoffer Nygaard	2:19.595	29
30	**GT2**	**No. 96 AF Corse**	**Jaime Melo**	**2:20.336**	**30**
31	GT2	No. 77 Team Felbermayr-Proton	Marc Lieb	2:20.416	31
32	GT2	No. 91 CRS Racing	Andrew Kirkaldy	2:20.811	32
33	GT2	No. 94 AF Corse	Matías Russo	2:20.941	33
34	GT2	No. 90 CRS Racing	Pierre Kaffer	2:21.095	34
35	GT1	No. 66 Atlas FX-Team Full Speed	Carlo van Dam	2:21.110	35
36	GT2	No. 88 Team Felbermayr-Proton	Patrick Long	2:21.173	36
37	GT2	No. 78 BMW Team Schnitzer	Dirk Werner	2:21.257	37
38	GT2	No. 76 IMSA Performance Matmut	Patrick Pilet	2:21.328	38
39	GT2	No. 75 Prospeed Competition	Marco Holzer	2:21.403	39
40	GT2	No. 92 JMW Motorsport	Darren Turner	2:21.420	40
41	GT1	No. 61 Matech Competition	Rahel Frey	2:21.422	41
42	GT2	No. 79 BMW Team Schnitzer	Dirk Müller	2:21.509	42
43	GT2	No. 85 Spyker Squadron	Tom Coronel	2:21.564	43
44	GT2	No .95 AF Corse	Giancarlo Fisichella	2:21.750	44
45	GT2	No. 89 Hankook Team Farnbacher	Allan Simonsen	2:21.752	45
46	GT1	No. 50 Larbre Compétition	Patrice Goueslard	2:21.918	46
47	FLM	No. 46 JMB Racing	Peter Kutemann	2:24.505	47
48	GT2	No. 98 Prospeed Competition	Paul van Splunteren	2:25.468	48
49	GT2	No. 93 JWA Racing	Niki Lanik	2:25.607	49
-	LMP2	No. 41 Team Bruichladdich	Thor-Christian Ebbesvik	No time	50

== Race ==
=== Race result ===
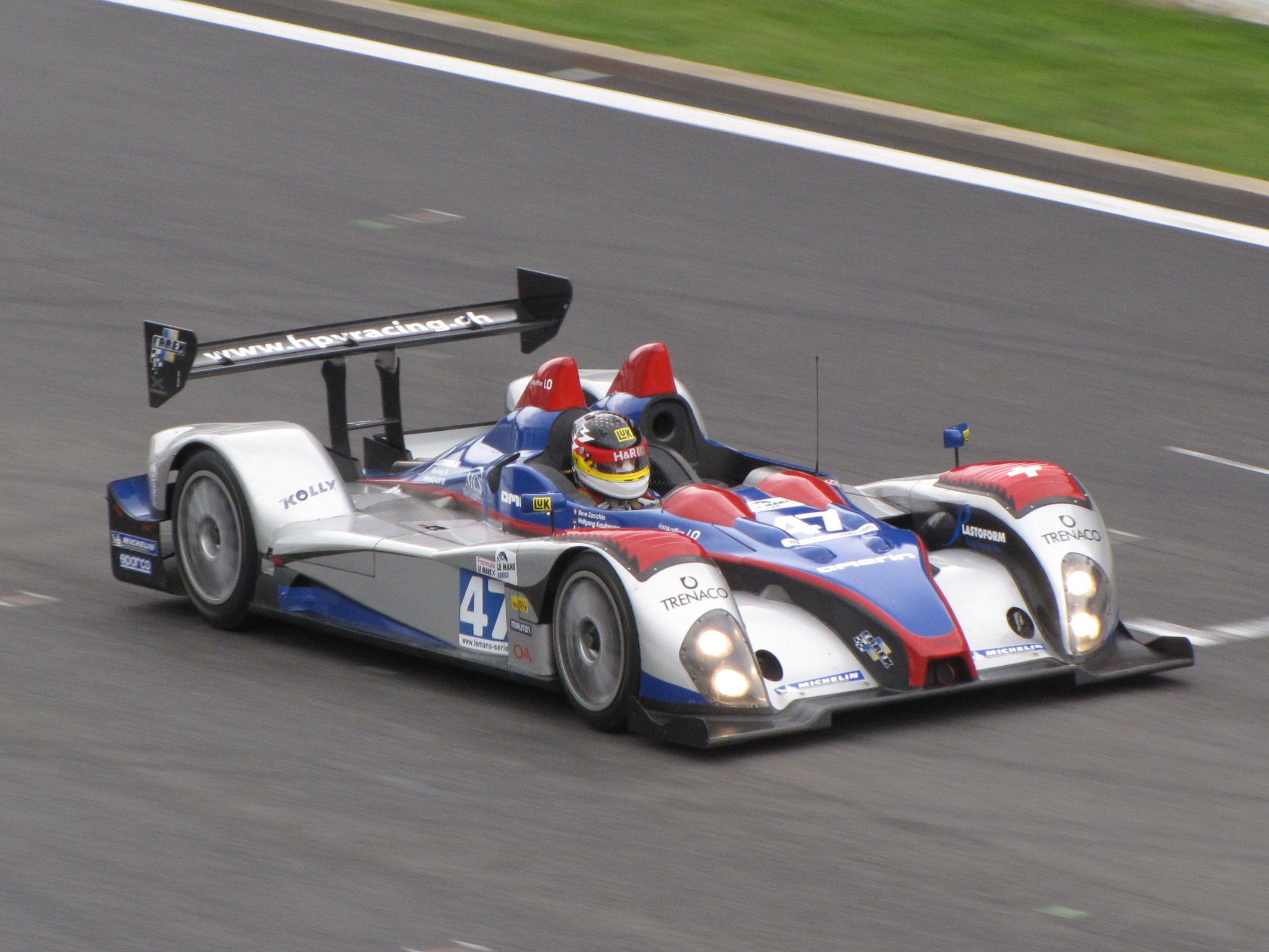
Wolfgang Kaufmann, Luca Moro and Steve Zacchia won the Formula Le Mans class in the No. 47 car.

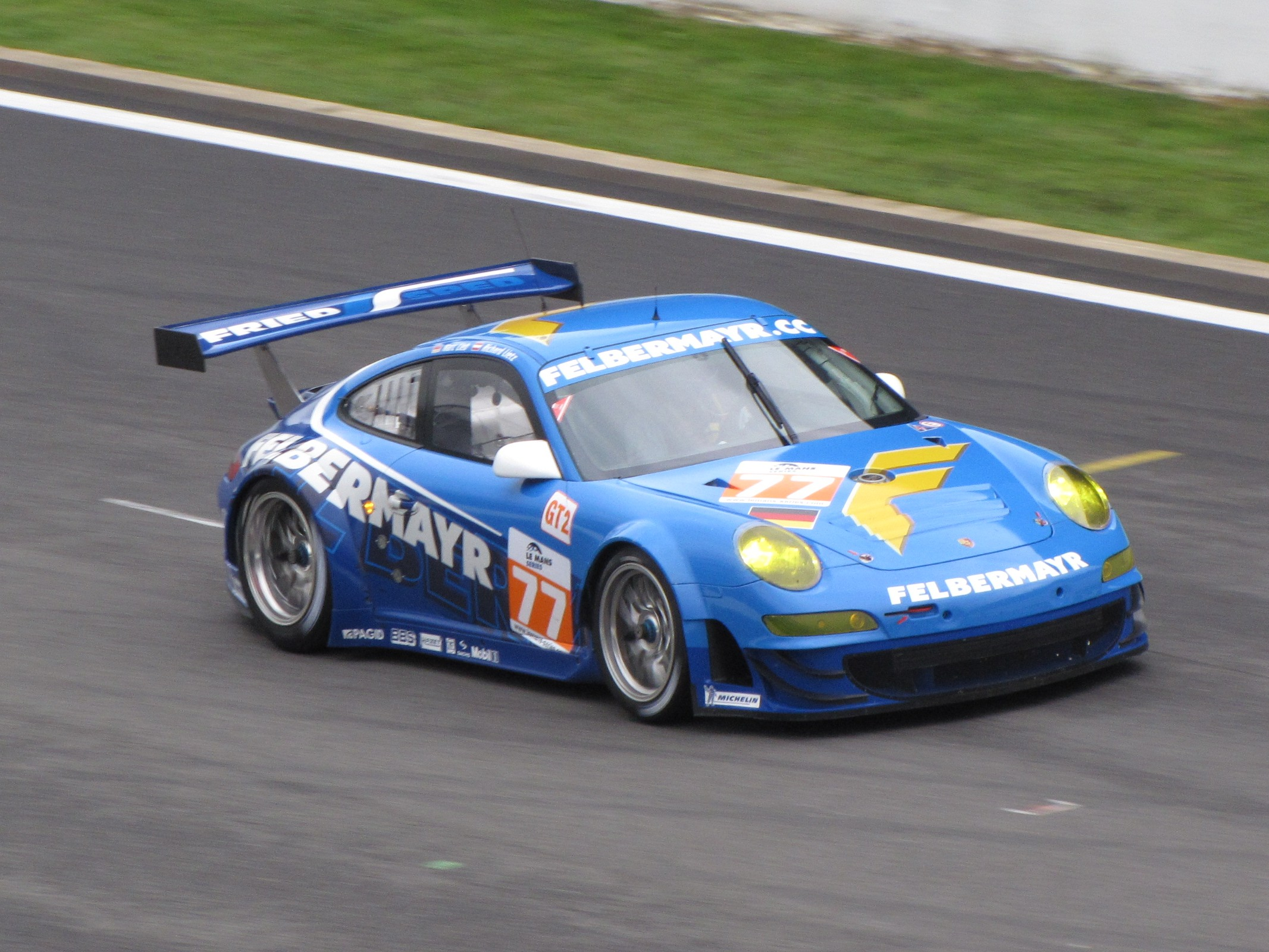
Marc Lieb and Richard Lietz won GT2 in car No. 77.

Class winners in bold. Cars failing to complete 70% of winner's distance marked as Not Classified (NC).

Pos	Class	No	Team	Drivers	Chassis	Tyre	Laps
Pos	Class	No	Team	Drivers	Engine	Tyre	Laps
1	**LMP1**	**3**	**(France) Team Peugeot Total**	**(Portugal) Pedro Lamy (France) Sébastien Bourdais (France) Simon Pagenaud**	**Peugeot 908 HDi FAP**	MI	**139**
1	**LMP1**	**3**	**(France) Team Peugeot Total**	**(Portugal) Pedro Lamy (France) Sébastien Bourdais (France) Simon Pagenaud**	**Peugeot HDi 5.5 L Turbo V12 (Diesel)**	MI	**139**
2	LMP1	2	(France) Team Peugeot Total	(France) Franck Montagny (France) Stéphane Sarrazin	Peugeot 908 HDi FAP	MI	139
2	LMP1	2	(France) Team Peugeot Total	(France) Franck Montagny (France) Stéphane Sarrazin	Peugeot HDi 5.5 L Turbo V12 (Diesel)	MI	139
3	LMP1	7	(Germany) Audi Sport Team Joest	(United Kingdom) Allan McNish (Italy) Rinaldo Capello (Denmark) Tom Kristensen	Audi R15 TDI plus	MI	139
3	LMP1	7	(Germany) Audi Sport Team Joest	(United Kingdom) Allan McNish (Italy) Rinaldo Capello (Denmark) Tom Kristensen	Audi TDI 5.5 L Turbo V10 (Diesel)	MI	139
4	LMP1	1	(France) Team Peugeot Total	(Spain) Marc Gené (Austria) Alexander Wurz (United Kingdom) Anthony Davidson	Peugeot 908 HDi FAP	MI	138
4	LMP1	1	(France) Team Peugeot Total	(Spain) Marc Gené (Austria) Alexander Wurz (United Kingdom) Anthony Davidson	Peugeot HDi 5.5 L Turbo V12 (Diesel)	MI	138
5	LMP1	9	(Germany) Audi Sport North America	(Germany) Timo Bernhard (Germany) Mike Rockenfeller (France) Romain Dumas	Audi R15 TDI plus	MI	137
5	LMP1	9	(Germany) Audi Sport North America	(Germany) Timo Bernhard (Germany) Mike Rockenfeller (France) Romain Dumas	Audi TDI 5.5 L Turbo V10 (Diesel)	MI	137
6	**LMP2**	**40**	**(Portugal) Quifel ASM Team**	**(Portugal) Miguel Amaral (France) Olivier Pla**	**Ginetta-Zytek GZ09SB/2**	D	**130**
6	**LMP2**	**40**	**(Portugal) Quifel ASM Team**	**(Portugal) Miguel Amaral (France) Olivier Pla**	**Zytek ZG348 3.4 L V8**	D	**130**
7	LMP2	25	(United Kingdom) RML	(United Kingdom) Mike Newton (Brazil) Thomas Erdos (United Kingdom) Andy Wallace	Lola B08/80	D	130
7	LMP2	25	(United Kingdom) RML	(United Kingdom) Mike Newton (Brazil) Thomas Erdos (United Kingdom) Andy Wallace	HPD AL7R 3.4 V8	D	130
8	LMP2	35	(France) OAK Racing	(France) Guillaume Moreau (Monaco) Richard Hein	Pescarolo 01	D	129
8	LMP2	35	(France) OAK Racing	(France) Guillaume Moreau (Monaco) Richard Hein	Judd DB 3.4 L V8	D	129
9	LMP2	24	(France) OAK Racing	(France) Jacques Nicolet (France) Matthieu Lahaye	Pescarolo 01	D	128
9	LMP2	24	(France) OAK Racing	(France) Jacques Nicolet (France) Matthieu Lahaye	Judd DB 3.4 L V8	D	128
10	LMP2	30	(Italy) Racing Box	(Italy) Andrea Piccini (Italy) Giacomo Piccini (Italy) Ferdinando Geri	Lola B09/80	P	128
10	LMP2	30	(Italy) Racing Box	(Italy) Andrea Piccini (Italy) Giacomo Piccini (Italy) Ferdinando Geri	Judd DB 3.4 L V8	P	128
11	LMP1	13	(Switzerland) Rebellion Racing	(Italy) Andrea Belicchi (France) Jean-Christophe Boullion	Lola B10/60	MI	127
11	LMP1	13	(Switzerland) Rebellion Racing	(Italy) Andrea Belicchi (France) Jean-Christophe Boullion	Rebellion (Judd) 5.5 L V10	MI	127
12	LMP1	8	(Germany) Audi Sport Team Joest	(Switzerland) Marcel Fässler (Germany) André Lotterer (France) Benoît Tréluyer	Audi R15 TDI plus	MI	126
12	LMP1	8	(Germany) Audi Sport Team Joest	(Switzerland) Marcel Fässler (Germany) André Lotterer (France) Benoît Tréluyer	Audi TDI 5.5 L Turbo V10 (Diesel)	MI	126
13	LMP1	008	(France) Signature-Plus	(France) Pierre Ragues (France) Franck Mailleux (Belgium) Vanina Ickx	Lola-Aston Martin B09/60	D	125
13	LMP1	008	(France) Signature-Plus	(France) Pierre Ragues (France) Franck Mailleux (Belgium) Vanina Ickx	Aston Martin AM04 6.0 L V12	D	125
14	**FLM**	**47**	**(Switzerland) Hope Polevision Racing**	**(Switzerland) Steve Zacchia (Germany) Wolfgang Kaufmann (Italy) Luca Moro**	**Oreca FLM09**	MI	**124**
14	**FLM**	**47**	**(Switzerland) Hope Polevision Racing**	**(Switzerland) Steve Zacchia (Germany) Wolfgang Kaufmann (Italy) Luca Moro**	**Corvette 6.2 L V8**	MI	**124**
15	**GT2**	**77**	**(Germany) Team Felbermayr-Proton**	**(Germany) Marc Lieb (Austria) Richard Lietz**	**Porsche 997 GT3-RSR**	MI	**124**
15	**GT2**	**77**	**(Germany) Team Felbermayr-Proton**	**(Germany) Marc Lieb (Austria) Richard Lietz**	**Porsche 4.0 L Flat-6**	MI	**124**
16	LMP2	36	(France) Pegasus Racing	(France) Julien Schell (France) Frédéric Da Rocha	Courage LC75	D	123
16	LMP2	36	(France) Pegasus Racing	(France) Julien Schell (France) Frédéric Da Rocha	AER P07 2.0 L Turbo I4	D	123
17	**GT1**	**70**	**(Belgium) Marc VDS Racing Team**	**(Belgium) Eric De Doncker (Belgium) Bas Leinders (Finland) Markus Palttala**	**Ford GT1**	MI	**123**
17	**GT1**	**70**	**(Belgium) Marc VDS Racing Team**	**(Belgium) Eric De Doncker (Belgium) Bas Leinders (Finland) Markus Palttala**	**Ford 5.3 L V8**	MI	**123**
18	FLM	45	(Belgium) Boutsen Energy Racing	(Belgium) Nicolas De Crem (Austria) Dominik Kraihamer (Belgium) Bernard Delhez	Oreca FLM09	MI	123
18	FLM	45	(Belgium) Boutsen Energy Racing	(Belgium) Nicolas De Crem (Austria) Dominik Kraihamer (Belgium) Bernard Delhez	Corvette 6.2 L V8	MI	123
19	GT2	96	(Italy) AF Corse	(Italy) Gianmaria Bruni (Brazil) Jaime Melo	Ferrari F430 GT2	MI	123
19	GT2	96	(Italy) AF Corse	(Italy) Gianmaria Bruni (Brazil) Jaime Melo	Ferrari 4.0 L V8	MI	123
20	GT2	95	(Italy) AF Corse	(Italy) Giancarlo Fisichella (Finland) Toni Vilander (France) Jean Alesi	Ferrari F430 GT2	MI	123
20	GT2	95	(Italy) AF Corse	(Italy) Giancarlo Fisichella (Finland) Toni Vilander (France) Jean Alesi	Ferrari 4.0 L V8	MI	123
21	GT2	79	(Germany) BMW Team Schnitzer	(Germany) Dirk Müller (United Kingdom) Andy Priaulx (Brazil) Augusto Farfus	BMW M3 GT2	D	123
21	GT2	79	(Germany) BMW Team Schnitzer	(Germany) Dirk Müller (United Kingdom) Andy Priaulx (Brazil) Augusto Farfus	BMW 4.0 L V8	D	123
22	GT2	76	(France) IMSA Performance Matmut	(France) Patrick Pilet (France) Raymond Narac	Porsche 997 GT3-RSR	MI	123
22	GT2	76	(France) IMSA Performance Matmut	(France) Patrick Pilet (France) Raymond Narac	Porsche 4.0 L Flat-6	MI	123
23	GT1	60	(Switzerland) Matech Competition	(Germany) Thomas Mutsch (Switzerland) Jonathan Hirschi (Switzerland) Mathias Beche	Ford GT1	MI	123
23	GT1	60	(Switzerland) Matech Competition	(Germany) Thomas Mutsch (Switzerland) Jonathan Hirschi (Switzerland) Mathias Beche	Ford 5.3 L V8	MI	123
24	GT2	91	(United Kingdom) CRS Racing	(United Kingdom) Andrew Kirkaldy (United Kingdom) Tim Mullen	Ferrari F430 GT2	MI	122
24	GT2	91	(United Kingdom) CRS Racing	(United Kingdom) Andrew Kirkaldy (United Kingdom) Tim Mullen	Ferrari 4.0 L V8	MI	122
25	GT2	85	(Netherlands) Spyker Squadron	(Netherlands) Tom Coronel (United Kingdom) Peter Dumbreck	Spyker C8 Laviolette GT2-R	MI	121
25	GT2	85	(Netherlands) Spyker Squadron	(Netherlands) Tom Coronel (United Kingdom) Peter Dumbreck	Audi 4.0 L V8	MI	121
26	GT2	88	(Germany) Team Felbermayr-Proton	(Germany) Christian Ried (Austria) Martin Ragginger (United States) Patrick Long	Porsche 997 GT3-RSR	MI	121
26	GT2	88	(Germany) Team Felbermayr-Proton	(Germany) Christian Ried (Austria) Martin Ragginger (United States) Patrick Long	Porsche 4.0 L Flat-6	MI	121
27	GT2	75	(Belgium) Prospeed Competition	(Germany) Marco Holzer (United Kingdom) Richard Westbrook	Porsche 997 GT3-RSR	MI	121
27	GT2	75	(Belgium) Prospeed Competition	(Germany) Marco Holzer (United Kingdom) Richard Westbrook	Porsche 4.0 L Flat-6	MI	121
28	GT1	61	(Switzerland) Matech Competition	(Switzerland) Cyndie Allemann (Switzerland) Rahel Frey (Switzerland) Yann Zimmer	Ford GT1	MI	121
28	GT1	61	(Switzerland) Matech Competition	(Switzerland) Cyndie Allemann (Switzerland) Rahel Frey (Switzerland) Yann Zimmer	Ford 5.3 L V8	MI	121
29	GT2	89	(Germany) Hankook Team Farnbacher	(Germany) Dominik Farnbacher (Denmark) Allan Simonsen	Ferrari F430 GT2	HK	121
29	GT2	89	(Germany) Hankook Team Farnbacher	(Germany) Dominik Farnbacher (Denmark) Allan Simonsen	Ferrari 4.0 L V8	HK	121
30	GT2	94	(Italy) AF Corse	(Argentina) Luís Pérez Companc (Argentina) Matías Russo	Ferrari F430 GT2	MI	120
30	GT2	94	(Italy) AF Corse	(Argentina) Luís Pérez Companc (Argentina) Matías Russo	Ferrari 4.0 L V8	MI	120
31	GT1	50	(France) Larbre Compétition	(Switzerland) Gabriele Gardel (France) Patrice Goueslard (Brazil) Fernando Rees	Saleen S7-R	MI	120
31	GT1	50	(France) Larbre Compétition	(Switzerland) Gabriele Gardel (France) Patrice Goueslard (Brazil) Fernando Rees	Ford 7.0 L V8	MI	120
32	GT1	72	(France) Luc Alphand Aventures	(France) Julien Jousse (France) Stéphan Grégoire (Netherlands) David Hart	Corvette C6.R	D	120
32	GT1	72	(France) Luc Alphand Aventures	(France) Julien Jousse (France) Stéphan Grégoire (Netherlands) David Hart	Corvette 7.0 L V8	D	120
33	GT1	66	(Austria) Atlas FX-Team Full Speed	(Belgium) Julien Schroyen (Netherlands) Carlo van Dam (Czech Republic) Adam Lacko	Saleen S7-R	MI	120
33	GT1	66	(Austria) Atlas FX-Team Full Speed	(Belgium) Julien Schroyen (Netherlands) Carlo van Dam (Czech Republic) Adam Lacko	Ford 7.0 L V8	MI	120
34	GT2	78	(Germany) BMW Team Schnitzer	(Germany) Jörg Müller (Germany) Dirk Werner (Germany) Uwe Alzen	BMW M3 GT2	D	120
34	GT2	78	(Germany) BMW Team Schnitzer	(Germany) Jörg Müller (Germany) Dirk Werner (Germany) Uwe Alzen	BMW 4.0 L V8	D	120
35	GT2	98	(Belgium) Prospeed Competition	(Netherlands) Paul van Splunteren (Belgium) Niek Hommerson (Belgium) Louis Machiels	Porsche 997 GT3-RSR	MI	119
35	GT2	98	(Belgium) Prospeed Competition	(Netherlands) Paul van Splunteren (Belgium) Niek Hommerson (Belgium) Louis Machiels	Porsche 4.0 L Flat-6	MI	119
36	FLM	46	(Monaco) JMB Racing	(Netherlands) Peter Kutemann (Switzerland) Maurice Basso (United Kingdom) John Hartshorne	Oreca FLM09	MI	117
36	FLM	46	(Monaco) JMB Racing	(Netherlands) Peter Kutemann (Switzerland) Maurice Basso (United Kingdom) John Hartshorne	Corvette 6.2 L V8	MI	117
37	GT2	93	(United Kingdom) JWA Racing	(United Kingdom) Paul Daniels (Netherlands) Oskar Slingerland (Austria) Niki Lanik	Porsche 997 GT3-RSR	D	116
37	GT2	93	(United Kingdom) JWA Racing	(United Kingdom) Paul Daniels (Netherlands) Oskar Slingerland (Austria) Niki Lanik	Porsche 4.0 L Flat-6	D	116
38	GT2	90	(United Kingdom) CRS Racing	(United Kingdom) Phil Quaife (Germany) Pierre Ehret (Germany) Pierre Kaffer	Ferrari F430 GT2	MI	105
38	GT2	90	(United Kingdom) CRS Racing	(United Kingdom) Phil Quaife (Germany) Pierre Ehret (Germany) Pierre Kaffer	Ferrari 4.0 L V8	MI	105
39	LMP2	27	(Switzerland) Race Performance	(Switzerland) Michel Frey (Switzerland) Ralph Meichtry (France) Pierre Bruneau	Radical SR9	D	103
39	LMP2	27	(Switzerland) Race Performance	(Switzerland) Michel Frey (Switzerland) Ralph Meichtry (France) Pierre Bruneau	Judd DB 3.4 L V8	D	103
40 NC	GT2	92	(United Kingdom) JMW Motorsport	(United Kingdom) Rob Bell (United Kingdom) Darren Turner	Aston Martin V8 Vantage GT2	D	86
40 NC	GT2	92	(United Kingdom) JMW Motorsport	(United Kingdom) Rob Bell (United Kingdom) Darren Turner	Aston Martin 4.5 L V8	D	86
41 DNF	GT1	52	(Germany) Young Driver AMR	(Denmark) Christoffer Nygaard (Czech Republic) Tomáš Enge (Germany) Stefan Mücke	Aston Martin DBR9	MI	82
41 DNF	GT1	52	(Germany) Young Driver AMR	(Denmark) Christoffer Nygaard (Czech Republic) Tomáš Enge (Germany) Stefan Mücke	Aston Martin AM04 6.0 L V12	MI	82
42 DNF	LMP2	39	(Germany) KSM	(France) Jean de Pourtales (Japan) Hideki Noda (United Kingdom) Jonathan Kennard	Lola B08/47	D	77
42 DNF	LMP2	39	(Germany) KSM	(France) Jean de Pourtales (Japan) Hideki Noda (United Kingdom) Jonathan Kennard	Judd DB 3.4 L V8	D	77
43 DNF	LMP2	42	(United Kingdom) Strakka Racing	(United Kingdom) Danny Watts (United Kingdom) Nick Leventis (United Kingdom) Jonny Kane	HPD ARX-01C	MI	69
43 DNF	LMP2	42	(United Kingdom) Strakka Racing	(United Kingdom) Danny Watts (United Kingdom) Nick Leventis (United Kingdom) Jonny Kane	HPD AL7R 3.4 L V8	MI	69
44 DNF	FLM	49	(France) Applewood Seven	(France) Damien Toulemonde (France) David Zollinger (Australia) Ross Zampatti	Oreca FLM09	MI	67
44 DNF	FLM	49	(France) Applewood Seven	(France) Damien Toulemonde (France) David Zollinger (Australia) Ross Zampatti	Corvette 6.2 L V8	MI	67
45 DNF	LMP1	12	(Switzerland) Rebellion Racing	(Switzerland) Neel Jani (France) Nicolas Prost	Lola B10/60	MI	65
45 DNF	LMP1	12	(Switzerland) Rebellion Racing	(Switzerland) Neel Jani (France) Nicolas Prost	Rebellion (Judd) 5.5 L V10	MI	65
46 DNF	FLM	48	(Switzerland) Hope Polevision Racing	(Belgium) Nico Verdonck (Switzerland) Christophe Pillon	Oreca FLM09	MI	30
46 DNF	FLM	48	(Switzerland) Hope Polevision Racing	(Belgium) Nico Verdonck (Switzerland) Christophe Pillon	Corvette 6.2 L V8	MI	30
47 DNF	FLM	43	(France) DAMS	(Italy) Alessandro Cicognani (Italy) Andrea Barlesi (France) Gary Chalandon	Oreca FLM09	MI	23
47 DNF	FLM	43	(France) DAMS	(Italy) Alessandro Cicognani (Italy) Andrea Barlesi (France) Gary Chalandon	Corvette 6.2 L V8	MI	23
48 DNF	LMP2	41	(United Kingdom) Team Bruichladdich	(Norway) Thor-Christian Ebbesvik (United Kingdom) Tim Greaves (Saudi Arabia) Karim Ojjeh	Ginetta-Zytek GZ09SB/2	D	15
48 DNF	LMP2	41	(United Kingdom) Team Bruichladdich	(Norway) Thor-Christian Ebbesvik (United Kingdom) Tim Greaves (Saudi Arabia) Karim Ojjeh	Zytek ZG348 3.4 L V8	D	15
49 DNF	LMP1	4	(France) Team Oreca Matmut	(France) Olivier Panis (France) Nicolas Lapierre (France) Loïc Duval	Peugeot 908 HDi FAP	MI	4
49 DNF	LMP1	4	(France) Team Oreca Matmut	(France) Olivier Panis (France) Nicolas Lapierre (France) Loïc Duval	Peugeot HDi 5.5 L Turbo V12 (Diesel)	MI	4
50 DNF	LMP2	29	(Italy) Racing Box	(Italy) Luca Pirri (Italy) Marco Cioci (Italy) Piergiuseppe Perazzini	Lola B09/80	D	0
50 DNF	LMP2	29	(Italy) Racing Box	(Italy) Luca Pirri (Italy) Marco Cioci (Italy) Piergiuseppe Perazzini	Judd DB 3.4 L V8	D	0

== See also ==
- 1000 km Spa

Le Mans Series
Previous race: 8 Hours of Le Castellet	2010 season	Next race: 1000 km of Algarve
