= 2010 1000 km of Algarve =

Layout of the Algarve International Circuit

The 2010 1000 km of Algarve was the third round of the 2010 Le Mans Series season. It took place at the Autódromo Internacional do Algarve on 17 July 2010.

== Qualifying ==
Qualifying saw Orecatake pole position in the LMP1 class. Strakka Racing once again took pole in the LMP2 class. Applewood Seven took the FLM pole. Atlas FX Team Full Speed took the GT1 pole being one of only two cars competing in the class. The No. 96 AF Corse took the GT2 pole.

=== Qualifying result ===
Pole position winners in each class are marked in bold.

Pos	Class	Team	Driver	Lap Time	Grid
1	**LMP1**	**No. 4 Team Oreca Matmut**	**Nicolas Lapierre**	**1:30.681**	**1**
2	LMP1	No. 12 Rebellion Racing	Neel Jani	1:30.937	31
3	LMP1	No. 008 Signature-Plus	Franck Mailleux	1:30.973	2
4	LMP1	No. 13 Rebellion Racing	Andrea Belicchi	1:31.831	32
5	**LMP2**	**No. 42 Strakka Racing**	**Danny Watts**	**1:33.489**	**3**
6	LMP2	No. 40 Quifel ASM Team	Olivier Pla	1:34.096	4
7	LMP2	No. 25 RML	Thomas Erdos	1:34.755	5
8	LMP2	No. 24 OAK Racing	Matthieu Lahaye	1:35.108	6
9	LMP2	No. 35 OAK Racing	Guillaume Moreau	1:35.242	7
10	LMP2	No. 41 Team Bruichladdich	Thor-Christian Ebbesvik	1:35.514	8
11	**FLM**	**No. 49 Applewood Seven**	**Karim Ojjeh**	**1:39.193**	**9**
12	FLM	No. 48 Hope Polevision Racing	Nico Verdonck	1:39.323	10
13	FLM	No. 47 Hope Polevision Racing	Steve Zacchia	1:39.967	11
14	FLM	No. 45 Boutsen Energy Racing	Dominik Kraihamer	1:40.517	12
15	FLM	No. 43 DAMS	Andrea Barlesi	1:41.043	13
16	FLM	No. 44 DAMS	Warren Hughes	1:41.279	14
17	LMP2	No. 36 Pegasus Racing	Julien Schell	1:42.638	15
18	**GT2**	**No. 96 AF Corse**	**Gianmaria Bruni**	**1:43.310**	**16**
19	GT2	No. 95 AF Corse	Toni Vilander	1:43.512	17
20	**GT1**	**No. 66 Atlas FX-Team FS**	**Carlo van Dam**	**1:43.975**	**18**
21	GT2	No. 91 CRS Racing	Tim Mullen	1:44.009	19
22	GT2	No. 88 Team Felbermayr-Proton	Martin Ragginger	1:44.305	20
23	GT2	No. 76 IMSA Performance Matmut	Patrick Pilet	1:44.367	21
24	GT2	No. 77 Team Felbermayr-Proton	Richard Lietz	1:44.524	22
25	GT1	No. 50 Larbre Compétition	Gabriele Gardel	1:44.752	23
26	GT2	No. 94 AF Corse	Matías Russo	1:44.774	24
27	GT2	No. 92 JMW Motorsport	Rob Bell	1:44.832	25
28	GT2	No. 75 Prospeed Competition	Marco Holzer	1:44.963	26
29	GT2	No. 89 Hankook Team Farnbacher	Allan Simonsen	1:45.000	27
30	GT2	No. 90 CRS Racing	Phil Quaife	1:45.387	28
31	GT2	No. 85 Spyker Squadron	Peter Dumbreck	1:45.526	29
32	FLM	No. 46 JMB Racing	John Hartshorne	1:47.863	30

== Race ==
=== Race result ===
Class winners in bold. Cars failing to complete 70% of winner's distance marked as Not Classified (NC).

Pos	Class	No	Team	Drivers	Chassis	Tyre	Laps
Pos	Class	No	Team	Drivers	Engine	Tyre	Laps
1	**LMP1**	**4**	**(France) Team Oreca Matmut**	**(France) Olivier Panis (France) Nicolas Lapierre (France) Stéphane Sarrazin**	**Peugeot 908 HDi FAP**	MI	**215**
1	**LMP1**	**4**	**(France) Team Oreca Matmut**	**(France) Olivier Panis (France) Nicolas Lapierre (France) Stéphane Sarrazin**	**Peugeot HDi 5.5 L Turbo V12 (Diesel)**	MI	**215**
2	LMP1	12	(Switzerland) Rebellion Racing	(France) Nicolas Prost (Switzerland) Neel Jani	Lola B10/60	MI	210
2	LMP1	12	(Switzerland) Rebellion Racing	(France) Nicolas Prost (Switzerland) Neel Jani	Rebellion (Judd) 5.5 L V10	MI	210
3	LMP1	008	(France) Signature-Plus	(France) Pierre Ragues (France) Franck Mailleux (Belgium) Vanina Ickx	Lola-Aston Martin B09/60	D	209
3	LMP1	008	(France) Signature-Plus	(France) Pierre Ragues (France) Franck Mailleux (Belgium) Vanina Ickx	Aston Martin AM04 6.0 L V12	D	209
4	**LMP2**	**25**	**(United Kingdom) RML**	**(Brazil) Thomas Erdos (United Kingdom) Mike Newton (United Kingdom) Ben Collins**	**Lola B08/80**	D	**201**
4	**LMP2**	**25**	**(United Kingdom) RML**	**(Brazil) Thomas Erdos (United Kingdom) Mike Newton (United Kingdom) Ben Collins**	**HPD AL7R 3.4 L V8**	D	**201**
5	LMP2	41	(United Kingdom) Team Bruichladdich	(Saudi Arabia) Karim Ojjeh (United Kingdom) Tim Greaves (Norway) Thor-Christian Ebbesvik	Ginetta-Zytek GZ09S/2	D	193
5	LMP2	41	(United Kingdom) Team Bruichladdich	(Saudi Arabia) Karim Ojjeh (United Kingdom) Tim Greaves (Norway) Thor-Christian Ebbesvik	Zytek ZG348 3.4 L V8	D	193
6	**FLM**	**44**	**(France) DAMS**	**(United Kingdom) Jody Firth (United Kingdom) Warren Hughes**	**Oreca FLM09**	MI	**193**
6	**FLM**	**44**	**(France) DAMS**	**(United Kingdom) Jody Firth (United Kingdom) Warren Hughes**	**Chevrolet LS3 6.2 L V8**	MI	**193**
7	**GT2**	**96**	**(Italy) AF Corse**	**(Italy) Gianmaria Bruni (Brazil) Jaime Melo**	**Ferrari F430 GTE**	MI	**192**
7	**GT2**	**96**	**(Italy) AF Corse**	**(Italy) Gianmaria Bruni (Brazil) Jaime Melo**	**Ferrari F136 4.0 V8**	MI	**192**
8	FLM	43	(France) DAMS	(Belgium) Andrea Barlesi (Italy) Alessandro Cicognani (France) Gary Chalandon	Oreca FLM09	MI	191
8	FLM	43	(France) DAMS	(Belgium) Andrea Barlesi (Italy) Alessandro Cicognani (France) Gary Chalandon	Chevrolet LS3 6.2 L V8	MI	191
9	GT2	95	(Italy) AF Corse	(France) Jean Alesi (Italy) Giancarlo Fisichella (Finland) Toni Vilander	Ferrari F430 GTE	MI	191
9	GT2	95	(Italy) AF Corse	(France) Jean Alesi (Italy) Giancarlo Fisichella (Finland) Toni Vilander	Ferrari F136 4.0 V8	MI	191
10	GT2	77	(Germany) Team Felbermayr-Proton	(Germany) Marc Lieb (Austria) Richard Lietz	Porsche 997 GT3-RSR	MI	191
10	GT2	77	(Germany) Team Felbermayr-Proton	(Germany) Marc Lieb (Austria) Richard Lietz	Porsche M97/74 4.0 L Flat-6	MI	191
11	GT2	92	(United Kingdom) JMW Motorsport	(United Kingdom) Rob Bell (United Kingdom) Darren Turner	Aston Martin V8 Vantage GT2	D	190
11	GT2	92	(United Kingdom) JMW Motorsport	(United Kingdom) Rob Bell (United Kingdom) Darren Turner	Aston Martin AJ37 4.5 L V8	D	190
12	GT2	88	(Germany) Team Felbermayr-Proton	(Austria) Martin Ragginger (Germany) Christian Ried (Germany) Wolf Henzler	Porsche 997 GT3-RSR	MI	190
12	GT2	88	(Germany) Team Felbermayr-Proton	(Austria) Martin Ragginger (Germany) Christian Ried (Germany) Wolf Henzler	Porsche M97/74 4.0 L Flat-6	MI	190
13	GT2	94	(Italy) AF Corse	(Argentina) Luis Pérez Companc (Argentina) Matías Russo	Ferrari F430 GTE	MI	190
13	GT2	94	(Italy) AF Corse	(Argentina) Luis Pérez Companc (Argentina) Matías Russo	Ferrari F136 4.0 V8	MI	190
14	GT2	89	(Germany) Hankook Team Farnbacher	(Germany) Dominik Farnbacher (Denmark) Allan Simonsen	Ferrari F430 GTE	HK	189
14	GT2	89	(Germany) Hankook Team Farnbacher	(Germany) Dominik Farnbacher (Denmark) Allan Simonsen	Ferrari F136 4.0 V8	HK	189
15	GT2	91	(United Kingdom) CRS Racing	(United Kingdom) Andrew Kirkaldy (United Kingdom) Tim Mullen	Ferrari F430 GTE	MI	189
15	GT2	91	(United Kingdom) CRS Racing	(United Kingdom) Andrew Kirkaldy (United Kingdom) Tim Mullen	Ferrari F136 4.0 V8	MI	189
16	GT2	85	(Netherlands) Spyker Squadron	(United Kingdom) Peter Dumbreck (Netherlands) Jeroen Bleekemolen	Spyker C8 Laviolette GT2-R	MI	188
16	GT2	85	(Netherlands) Spyker Squadron	(United Kingdom) Peter Dumbreck (Netherlands) Jeroen Bleekemolen	Audi 4.0 L V8	MI	188
17	GT2	76	(France) IMSA Performance Matmut	(France) Patrick Pilet (France) Raymond Narac	Porsche 997 GT3-RSR	MI	188
17	GT2	76	(France) IMSA Performance Matmut	(France) Patrick Pilet (France) Raymond Narac	Porsche M97/74 4.0 L Flat-6	MI	188
18	GT2	90	(United Kingdom) CRS Racing	(Germany) Pierre Ehret (United Kingdom) Phil Quaife (Germany) Pierre Kaffer	Ferrari F430 GTE	MI	187
18	GT2	90	(United Kingdom) CRS Racing	(Germany) Pierre Ehret (United Kingdom) Phil Quaife (Germany) Pierre Kaffer	Ferrari F136 4.0 V8	MI	187
19	FLM	45	(Belgium) Boutsen Energy Racing	(Austria) Dominik Kraihamer (Belgium) Nicolas de Crem (Belgium) Bernard Delhez	Oreca FLM09	MI	187
19	FLM	45	(Belgium) Boutsen Energy Racing	(Austria) Dominik Kraihamer (Belgium) Nicolas de Crem (Belgium) Bernard Delhez	Chevrolet LS3 6.2 L V8	MI	187
20	LMP1	13	(Switzerland) Rebellion Racing	(Italy) Andrea Belicchi (France) Jean-Christophe Boullion	Lola B10/60	MI	186
20	LMP1	13	(Switzerland) Rebellion Racing	(Italy) Andrea Belicchi (France) Jean-Christophe Boullion	Rebellion (Judd) 5.5 L V10	MI	186
21	**GT1**	**50**	**(France) Larbre Compétition**	**(France) Gabriele Gardel (France) Patrice Goueslard (Brazil) Fernando Rees**	**Saleen S7-R**	MI	**184**
21	**GT1**	**50**	**(France) Larbre Compétition**	**(France) Gabriele Gardel (France) Patrice Goueslard (Brazil) Fernando Rees**	**Ford Windsor 7.0 L V8**	MI	**184**
22	LMP2	36	(France) Pegasus Racing	(France) Julien Schell (France) Frédéric da Rocha	Courage-Oreca LC75	D	179
22	LMP2	36	(France) Pegasus Racing	(France) Julien Schell (France) Frédéric da Rocha	AER P07 2.0 L Turbo I4	D	179
23	FLM	46	(Monaco) JMB Racing	(Netherlands) Peter Kutemann (Switzerland) Maurice Basso (United Kingdom) John Hartshorne	Oreca FLM09	MI	175
23	FLM	46	(Monaco) JMB Racing	(Netherlands) Peter Kutemann (Switzerland) Maurice Basso (United Kingdom) John Hartshorne	Chevrolet LS3 6.2 L V8	MI	175
24	GT1	66	(Austria) Atlas FX-Team FS	(Belgium) Julien Schroyen (Netherlands) Carlo van Dam (Austria) Norbert Walchhofer	Saleen S7-R	MI	171
24	GT1	66	(Austria) Atlas FX-Team FS	(Belgium) Julien Schroyen (Netherlands) Carlo van Dam (Austria) Norbert Walchhofer	Ford Windsor 7.0 L V8	MI	171
25	LMP2	24	(France) OAK Racing	(France) Matthieu Lahaye (France) Jacques Nicolet	Pescarolo 01	D	153
25	LMP2	24	(France) OAK Racing	(France) Matthieu Lahaye (France) Jacques Nicolet	Judd DB 3.4 L V8	D	153
26 DNF	LMP2	42	(United Kingdom) Strakka Racing	(United Kingdom) Nick Leventis (United Kingdom) Danny Watts (United Kingdom) Jonny Kane	HPD ARX-01C	MI	120
26 DNF	LMP2	42	(United Kingdom) Strakka Racing	(United Kingdom) Nick Leventis (United Kingdom) Danny Watts (United Kingdom) Jonny Kane	HPD AL7R 3.4 L V8	MI	120
27 DNF	LMP2	35	(France) OAK Racing	(France) Guillaume Moreau (Monaco) Richard Hein	Pescarolo 01	D	91
27 DNF	LMP2	35	(France) OAK Racing	(France) Guillaume Moreau (Monaco) Richard Hein	Judd DB 3.4 L V8	D	91
28 DNF	LMP2	40	(Portugal) Quifel ASM Team	(Portugal) Miguel Amaral (France) Olivier Pla	Ginetta-Zytek GZ09S/2	D	91
28 DNF	LMP2	40	(Portugal) Quifel ASM Team	(Portugal) Miguel Amaral (France) Olivier Pla	Zytek ZG348 3.4 L V8	D	91
29 DNF	GT2	75	(Belgium) Prospeed Competition	(Germany) Marco Holzer (United Kingdom) Richard Westbrook	Porsche 997 GT3-RSR	MI	38
29 DNF	GT2	75	(Belgium) Prospeed Competition	(Germany) Marco Holzer (United Kingdom) Richard Westbrook	Porsche M97/74 4.0 L Flat-6	MI	38
30 DNF	FLM	49	(France) Applewood Seven	(France) Damien Toulemonde (France) Mathias Beche	Oreca FLM09	MI	26
30 DNF	FLM	49	(France) Applewood Seven	(France) Damien Toulemonde (France) Mathias Beche	Chevrolet LS3 6.2 L V8	MI	26
31 DNF	FLM	47	(Switzerland) Hope Polevision Racing	(Switzerland) Steve Zacchia (France) Olivier Lombard (Italy) Luca Moro	Oreca FLM09	MI	3
31 DNF	FLM	47	(Switzerland) Hope Polevision Racing	(Switzerland) Steve Zacchia (France) Olivier Lombard (Italy) Luca Moro	Chevrolet LS3 6.2 L V8	MI	3
32 DNF	FLM	48	(Switzerland) Hope Polevision Racing	(Switzerland) Christophe Pillon (Belgium) Nico Verdonck (France) Vincent Capillaire	Oreca FLM09	MI	1
32 DNF	FLM	48	(Switzerland) Hope Polevision Racing	(Switzerland) Christophe Pillon (Belgium) Nico Verdonck (France) Vincent Capillaire	Chevrolet LS3 6.2 L V8	MI	1

Le Mans Series
Previous race: 1000 km of Spa	2010 season	Next race: 1000 km of Hungaroring
