= 2010 Le Mans Series =

7th season of sports car racing series

Seasons
- ← 2009 2011 →

The 2010 Le Mans Series was the seventh season of Automobile Club de l'Ouest's Le Mans Series. It featured five events between 11 April and 12 September 2010. For the first time in 2010, Formula Le Mans (FLM) cars were run in a fifth class in the series, running alongside Le Mans Prototype cars and GT cars, rather than as a support series. It was also the final season when GT1 cars were allowed to run in the series.

Stéphane Sarrazin won the LMP1 championship despite sharing his car with Nicolas Lapierre for most of the season; Sarrazin did not run with his usual Team Oreca Matmut outfit at the 1000 km of Spa, instead gaining championship points with his Peugeot Sport teammates in a precursor to the 24 Hours of Le Mans the following month. Despite this, Sarrazin won only one race, winning at the 1000 km of Algarve with Lapierre and Olivier Panis. Lapierre was second ahead of Rinaldo Capello, who won at Paul Ricard with Allan McNish. Other class victories went to Sébastien Bourdais, Pedro Lamy and Simon Pagenaud at Spa, Greg Mansell and Leo Mansell at the Hungaroring, and Nicolas Minassian and Anthony Davidson at Silverstone. In LMP2, Thomas Erdos and Mike Newton claimed the championship for the second time, after their more consistent finishes helped them to fend off Strakka Racing's Jonny Kane, Danny Watts and Nick Leventis, who won three races to one for Erdos and Newton. The only other win was taken by Miguel Amaral and Olivier Pla at Spa.

The GT1 championship went to Larbre Compétition pairing Gabriele Gardel and Patrice Goueslard, as they were the only team to attempt every race in the championship. Julien Canal and Fernando Rees joined them in various races but were not a factor in the championship. The only team to beat Larbre during the season was the Marc VDS Racing Team car of Eric De Doncker, Bas Leinders and Markus Palttala, who won at Spa. GT2 proceedings saw a second successive title for Felbermayr-Proton duo Marc Lieb and Richard Lietz, winning three of the season's five races. The other two were taken by AF Corse duo Gianmaria Bruni and Jaime Melo at Algarve and at Silverstone. Another tight championship battle was fought out in the Formula Le Mans class, with DAMS' Andrea Barlesi and Gary Chalandon holding off Hope Polevision Racing driver Steve Zacchia by just two points. The season's five races were shared between four different entries, with Barlesi and Chalandon only winning at the Hungaroring with Alessandro Cicognani. Zacchia won at Spa with Wolfgang Kaufmann and Luca Moro, Damien Toulemonde, Ross Zampatti and David Zollinger won at Paul Ricard, while Jody Firth and Warren Hughes won twice, in the Algarve, and at Silverstone.

== Schedule ==
On 27 October 2009 the ACO released a preliminary calendar for the 2010 season featuring three named events and two unconfirmed events, plus the traditional pre-season test session at Circuit Paul Ricard. The calendar was further revised with two additional events at the Autódromo Internacional do Algarve and the Hungaroring. The Paul Ricard race was also extended to eight hours in length. The 1000 km of Silverstone was also part of the inaugural Le Mans Intercontinental Cup for LMP1s, and it was also the first time that the race had been run on the circuit's "Arena" configuration.

Except for the 8 hours of Castellet, as the name implied an eight-hour time limit, all races ran for either 1000 km or six hours, whichever came first; partially wet weather and a red flag period caused the 2010 1000 km of Spa to run slightly less than the 143 laps it was originally scheduled; the top three finishers completed 139 laps at the end of six hours. The 2010 1000 km of Hungaroring race was also run at a distance shorter than the 1000-km scheduled distance after six hours.

| Rnd | Race | Circuit | Date |
|---|---|---|---|
| – | Official Test Session | Circuit Paul Ricard, Le Castellet, France | 7–9 March |
| 1 | 8 Hours of Castellet | Circuit Paul Ricard, Le Castellet, France | 11 April |
| 2 | 1000 km of Spa | Circuit de Spa-Francorchamps, Belgium | 9 May |
| 3 | 1000 km of Algarve | Autódromo Internacional do Algarve, Portimão, Portugal | 17 July |
| 4 | 1000 km of Hungaroring | Hungaroring, Mogyoród, Hungary | 22 August |
| 5 | Autosport 1000 km of Silverstone | Silverstone Circuit, United Kingdom | 12 September |

== Season results ==
Overall winner in bold.

| Rnd. | Circuit | LMP1 Winning Team | LMP2 Winning Team | FLM Winning Team | GT1 Winning Team | GT2 Winning Team | Results |
| Rnd. | Circuit | LMP1 Winning Drivers | LMP2 Winning Drivers | FLM Winning Drivers | GT1 Winning Drivers | GT2 Winning Drivers | Results |
|---|---|---|---|---|---|---|---|
| 1 | Paul Ricard | (Germany) **No. 7 Audi Sport Team Joest** | (United Kingdom) No. 42 Strakka Racing | (France) No. 49 Applewood Seven | (France) No. 50 Larbre Compétition | (Germany) No. 77 Team Felbermayr-Proton | Results |
| 1 | Paul Ricard | (United Kingdom) **Allan McNish** **(Italy) Rinaldo Capello** | (United Kingdom) Danny Watts (United Kingdom) Nick Leventis (United Kingdom) Jonny Kane | (France) Damien Toulemonde (France) David Zollinger (Australia) Ross Zampatti | (Switzerland) Gabriele Gardel (France) Patrice Goueslard (France) Julien Canal | (Germany) Marc Lieb (Austria) Richard Lietz | Results |
| 2 | Spa | (France) **No.3 Team Peugeot Total** | (Portugal) No. 40 Quifel-ASM Team | (Switzerland) No. 47 Hope Polevision Racing | (Belgium) No. 70 Marc VDS Racing Team | (Germany) No. 77 Team Felbermayr-Proton | Results |
| 2 | Spa | (France) **Sébastien Bourdais** **(Portugal) Pedro Lamy** **(France) Simon Pagenaud** | (Portugal) Miguel Amaral (France) Olivier Pla | (Germany) Wolfgang Kaufmann (Switzerland) Steve Zacchia (Italy) Luca Moro | (Belgium) Eric De Doncker (Belgium) Bas Leinders (Finland) Markus Palttala | (Germany) Marc Lieb (Austria) Richard Lietz | Results |
| 3 | Algarve | (France) **No. 4 Team Oreca Matmut** | (United Kingdom) No. 25 RML | (France) No. 44 DAMS | (France) No. 50 Larbre Compétition | (Italy) No. 96 AF Corse | Results |
| 3 | Algarve | (France) **Olivier Panis** **(France) Nicolas Lapierre** **(France) Stéphane Sarrazin** | (United Kingdom) Mike Newton (Brazil) Thomas Erdos (United Kingdom) Ben Collins | (United Kingdom) Jody Firth (United Kingdom) Warren Hughes | (Switzerland) Gabriele Gardel (France) Patrice Goueslard (Brazil) Fernando Rees | (Italy) Gianmaria Bruni (Brazil) Jaime Melo | Results |
| 4 | Hungaroring | (United Kingdom) No. 5 Beechdean Mansell | (United Kingdom) **No. 42 Strakka Racing** | (France) No. 43 DAMS | (France) No. 50 Larbre Compétition | (Germany) No. 77 Team Felbermayr-Proton | Results |
| 4 | Hungaroring | (United Kingdom) Greg Mansell (United Kingdom) Leo Mansell | (United Kingdom) **Nick Leventis** **(United Kingdom) Danny Watts** **(United Kingdom) Jonny Kane** | (Belgium) Andrea Barlesi (Italy) Alessandro Cicognani (France) Gary Chalandon | (Switzerland) Gabriele Gardel (France) Patrice Goueslard (Brazil) Fernando Rees | (Germany) Marc Lieb (Austria) Richard Lietz | Results |
| 5 | Silverstone | (France) **No. 1 Team Peugeot Total** | (United Kingdom) No. 42 Strakka Racing | (France) No. 44 DAMS | (France) No. 50 Larbre Compétition | (Italy) No. 96 AF Corse | Results |
| 5 | Silverstone | **(France) Nicolas Minassian** **(United Kingdom) Anthony Davidson** | (United Kingdom) Danny Watts (United Kingdom) Jonny Kane (United Kingdom) Nick Leventis | (United Kingdom) Jody Firth (United Kingdom) Warren Hughes | (Switzerland) Gabriele Gardel (France) Patrice Goueslard (Brazil) Fernando Rees | (Italy) Gianmaria Bruni (Brazil) Jaime Melo | Results |

== Championship Standings ==
Points were awarded to all race finishers, with unclassified entries failing to complete 70% of the race distance or entries failing to reach the finish not earning championship points. One bonus point was awarded for winning pole position (denoted by bold), and a further bonus was awarded for the entry which sets the fastest race lap (denoted by italics). Entries which changed an engine prior to the required two race minimum were penalized two points, with a four-point penalty for every subsequent engine change.

Points were allocated in one of two ways, dependent on race length.

Points System
| Race Distance | Position | | | | | | | | | | | | Pole Position | Fastest Lap |
| Race Distance | 1st | 2nd | 3rd | 4th | 5th | 6th | 7th | 8th | 9th | 10th | 11th | 12th And Lower | Pole Position | Fastest Lap |
|---|---|---|---|---|---|---|---|---|---|---|---|---|---|---|
| 1000 km | 15 | 13 | 11 | 9 | 8 | 7 | 6 | 5 | 4 | 3 | 2 | 1 | 1 | 1 |
| Over 1500 km | 30 | 26 | 22 | 18 | 16 | 14 | 12 | 10 | 8 | 6 | 4 | 2 | 1 | 2 |

== Teams Championships ==
The top two finishers in the LMP1, LMP2 and GT2 championships earned automatic entry to the 2011 24 Hours of Le Mans, provided that the team was running for the full season. Partial season entries (teams that run on a part-time basis, e.g. race-by-race) were not eligible for automatic entries for the 24 Hours of Le Mans.

GT1 championships were not awarded any automatic entries as the GT1 category was phased out by the end of the year (see New 2011 regulations section).

=== LMP1 Standings ===
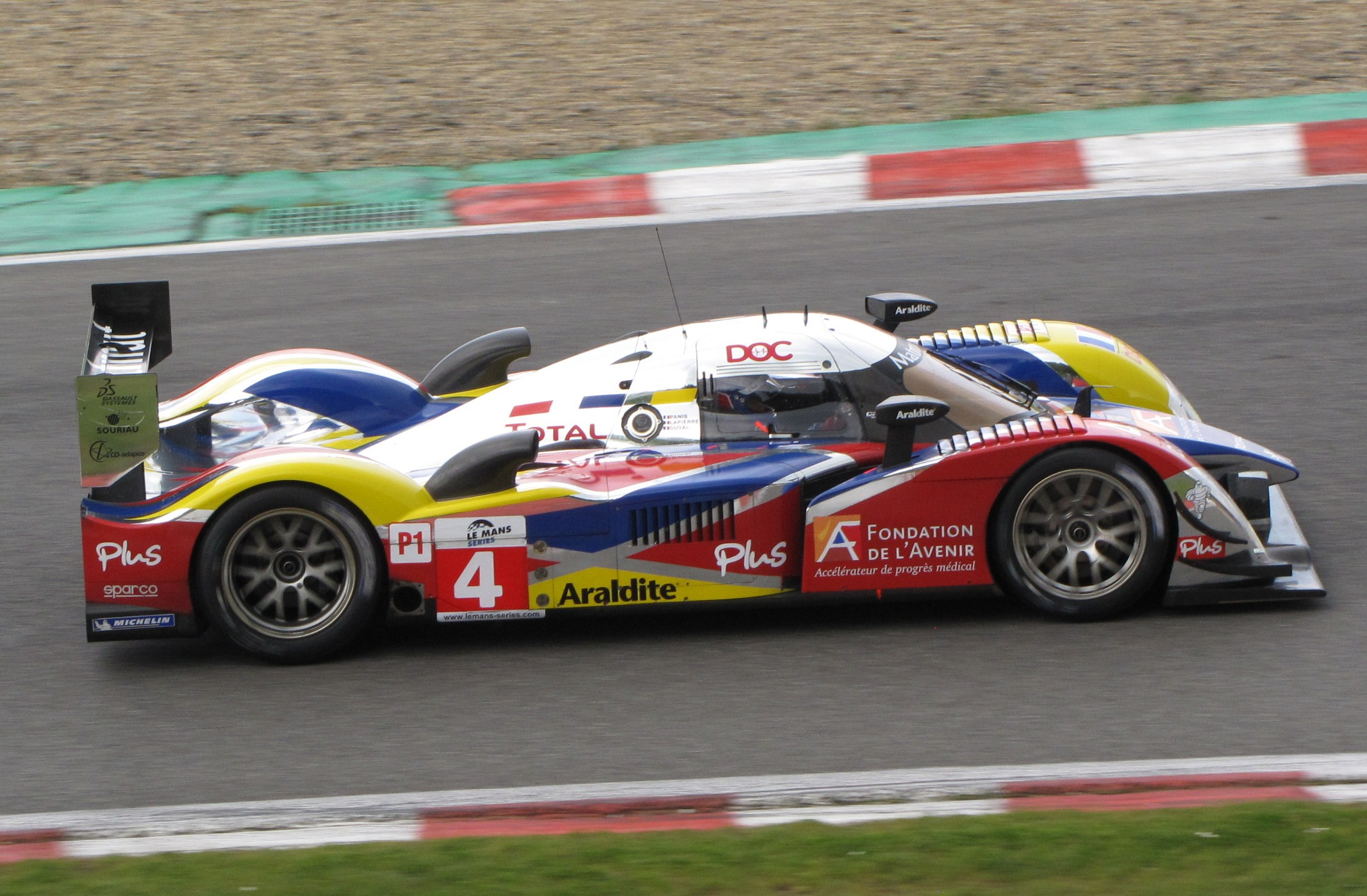
With one victory over the season, Team Oreca Matmut won the LMP1 teams title.

| Pos | No. | Team | Chassis | Engine | LEC (France) | SPA (Belgium) | ALG (Portugal) | HUN (Hungary) | SIL (United Kingdom) | Total |
|---|---|---|---|---|---|---|---|---|---|---|
| 1 | 4 | (France) Team Oreca Matmut | Peugeot 908 HDi FAP | Peugeot HDi 5.5 L Turbo V12 (Diesel) | 4 | Ret | 1 | 4 | 2 | 63 |
| 2 | 008 | (France) Signature Plus | Lola-Aston Martin B09/60 | Aston Martin AM04 6.0 L V12 | 6 | 8 | 3 | 3 | 6 | 55 |
| 3 | 12 | (Switzerland) Rebellion Racing | Lola B10/60 | Rebellion 5.5 L V10 | 7 | Ret | 2 | 2 | 5 | 52 |
| 4 | 7 | (Germany) Audi Sport Team Joest | Audi R15 TDI plus | Audi TDI 5.5 L Turbo V10 (Diesel) | 1 | 3 | | | Ret | 45 |
| 5 | 13 | (Switzerland) Rebellion Racing | Lola B10/60 | Rebellion 5.5 L V10 | 3 | 6 | 4 | Ret | 10 | 44 |
| 6 | 009 | (United Kingdom) Aston Martin Racing | Lola-Aston Martin B09/60 | Aston Martin AM04 6.0 L V12 | 2 | | | | 4 | 38 |
| 7 | 5 | (United Kingdom) Beechdean Mansell | Ginetta-Zytek GZ09SB | Zytek ZJ458 4.5 L V8 | 8 | | | 1 | 7 | 34 |
| 8 | 1 | (France) Team Peugeot Total | Peugeot 908 HDi FAP | Peugeot HDi 5.5 L Turbo V12 (Diesel) | | 4 | | | 1 | 27 |
| 9 | 8 | (Germany) Audi Sport Team Joest | Audi R15 TDI plus | Audi TDI 5.5 L Turbo V10 (Diesel) | | 8 | | | 3 | 21 |
| 10 | 3 | (France) Team Peugeot Total | Peugeot 908 HDi FAP | Peugeot HDi 5.5 L Turbo V12 (Diesel) | | 1 | | | | 18 |
| 11 | 6 | (France) AIM Team Oreca Matmut | Oreca 01 | AIM YS5.5 5.5 L V10 | 5 | | | | | 17 |
| 12 | 2 | (France) Team Peugeot Total | Peugeot 908 HDi FAP | Peugeot HDi 5.5 L Turbo V12 (Diesel) | | 2 | | | | 15 |
| 13 | 9 | (Germany) Audi Sport North America | Audi R15 TDI plus | Audi TDI 5.5 L Turbo V10 (Diesel) | | 5 | | | | 10 |
| 14 | 11 | (United Kingdom) Drayson Racing | Lola B09/60 | Judd GV5.5 S2 5.5 L V10 | | | | | 8 | 7 |
| 15 | 20 | (United Kingdom) Team LNT | Ginetta-Zytek GZ09S | Zytek ZJ458 4.5 L V8 | | | | | 9 | 6 |
| - | 007 | (United Kingdom) Aston Martin Racing | Lola-Aston Martin B09/60 | Aston Martin AM04 6.0 L V12 | | | | | NC | 0 |

=== LMP2 Standings ===
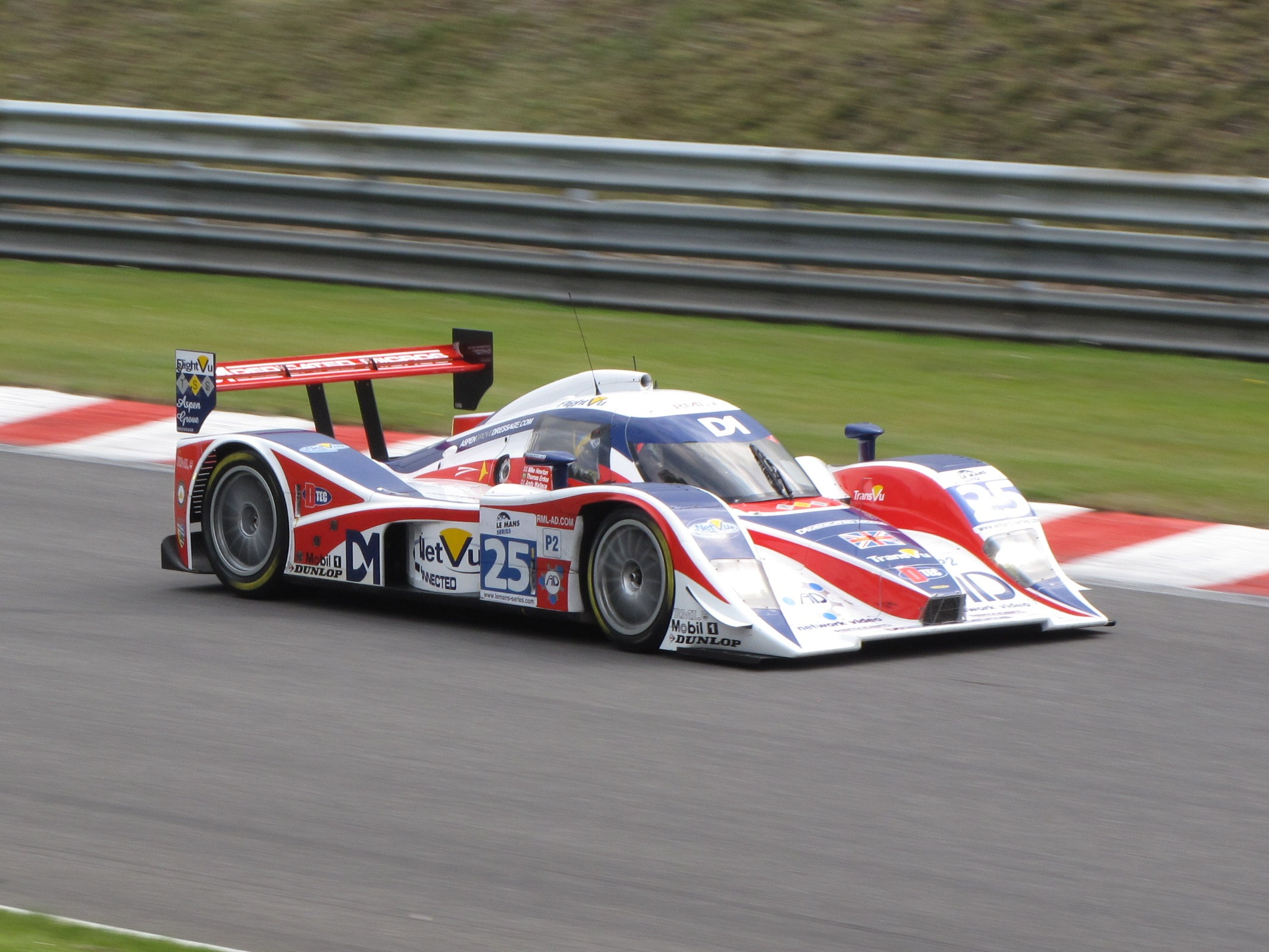
RML, and drivers Thomas Erdos and Mike Newton, won their respective LMP2 class championships.

| Pos | No. | Team | Chassis | Engine | LEC (France) | SPA (Belgium) | ALG (Portugal) | HUN (Hungary) | SIL (United Kingdom) | Total |
|---|---|---|---|---|---|---|---|---|---|---|
| 1 | 25 | (United Kingdom) RML | Lola B08/80 | HPD AL7R 3.4 L V8 | 3 | 2 | 1 | 4 | 4 | 75 |
| 2 | 42 | (United Kingdom) Strakka Racing | HPD ARX-01C | HPD AL7R 3.4 L V8 | 1 | Ret | Ret | 1 | 1 | 69 |
| 3 | 24 | (France) OAK Racing | Pescarolo 01 | Judd DB 3.4 L V8 | 4 | 4 | 4 | 3 | 6 | 53 |
| 4 | 35 | (France) OAK Racing | Pescarolo 01 | Judd DB 3.4 L V8 | 2 | 3 | Ret | 7 | 3 | 52 |
| 5 | 41 | (United Kingdom) Team Bruichladdich | Ginetta-Zytek GZ09SB/2 | Zytek ZG348 3.4 L V8 | 5 | Ret | 2 | 5 | 8 | 46 |
| 6 | 40 | (Portugal) Quifel ASM Team | Ginetta-Zytek GZ09SB/2 | Zytek ZG348 3.4 L V8 | Ret | 1 | Ret | 2 | 2 | 44 |
| 7 | 30 | (Italy) Racing Box | Lola B09/80 | Judd DB 3.4 L V8 | 6 | 5 | | 10 | 5 | 39 |
| 8 | 36 | (France) Pegasus Racing | Courage LC75 | AER P07 2.0 L Turbo I4 | 7 | 6 | 3 | Ret | Ret | 34 |
| 9 | 39 | (Germany) KSM Motorsport | Lola B08/47 | Judd DB 3.4 L V8 | 8 | Ret | | | 9 | 17 |
| 10 | 27 | (Switzerland) Race Performance | Radical SR9 | Judd DB 3.4 L V8 | Ret | 7 | | 9 | 10 | 17 |
| 11 | 29 | (Italy) Racing Box | Lola B09/80 | Judd DB 3.4 L V8 | Ret | | | 6 | 7 | 15 |
| 12 | 31 | (United Kingdom) RLR MSport | MG-Lola EX265 | AER P07 2.0 L Turbo I4 | | | | 8 | NC | 7 |
| - | 37 | (France) WR / Salini | WR LMP2008 | Zytek ZG348 3.4 L V8 | Ret | | | | | 0 |

=== FLM Standings ===
All teams in the Formula Le Mans category utilized the Oreca FLM09 chassis and General Motors LS3 6.3 L V8.

| Pos | No. | Team | LEC (France) | SPA (Belgium) | ALG (Portugal) | HUN (Hungary) | SIL (United Kingdom) | Total |
|---|---|---|---|---|---|---|---|---|
| 1 | 43 | (France) DAMS | 3 | Ret | 2 | 1 | 4 | 59 |
| 2 | 47 | (Switzerland) Hope Polevision Racing | 4 | 1 | Ret | 3 | 2 | 57 |
| 3 | 45 | (Belgium) Boutsen Energy Racing | Ret | 2 | 3 | 4 | 5 | 41 |
| 4 | 46 | (Monaco) JMB Racing | Ret | 3 | 4 | 2 | 6 | 40 |
| 5 | 48 | (Switzerland) Hope Polevision Racing | 2 | Ret | Ret | | 3 | 39 |
| 6 | 49 | (France) Applewood Seven | 1 | Ret | Ret | Ret | | 32 |
| 7 | 44 | (France) DAMS | Ret | | 1 | Ret | 1 | 31 |

=== GT1 Standings ===
| Pos | No. | Team | Chassis | Engine | LEC (France) | SPA (Belgium) | ALG (Portugal) | HUN (Hungary) | SIL (United Kingdom) | Total |
|---|---|---|---|---|---|---|---|---|---|---|
| 1 | 50 | (France) Larbre Compétition | Saleen S7-R | Ford Windsor 7.0 L V8 | 1 | 4 | 1 | 1 | 1 | 97 |
| 2 | 66 | (Austria) Atlas FX-Team FS | Saleen S7-R | Ford Windsor 7.0 L V8 | | 6 | 2 | Ret | | 25 |
| 3 | 70 | (Belgium) Marc VDS Racing Team | Ford GT1 | Ford Cammer 5.3 L V8 | | 1 | | | | 18 |
| 4 | 60 | (Switzerland) Matech Competition | Ford GT1 | Ford Cammer 5.3 L V8 | | 2 | | | | 15 |
| 5 | 61 | (Switzerland) Matech Competition | Ford GT1 | Ford Cammer 5.3 L V8 | | 3 | | | | 13 |
| 6 | 72 | (France) Luc Alphand Aventures | Corvette C6.R | Corvette LS7.R 7.0 L V8 | | 5 | | | | 10 |
| - | 52 | (Germany) Young Driver AMR | Aston Martin DBR9 | Aston Martin AM04 6.0 L V12 | | Ret | | | | 0 |

=== GT2 Standings ===
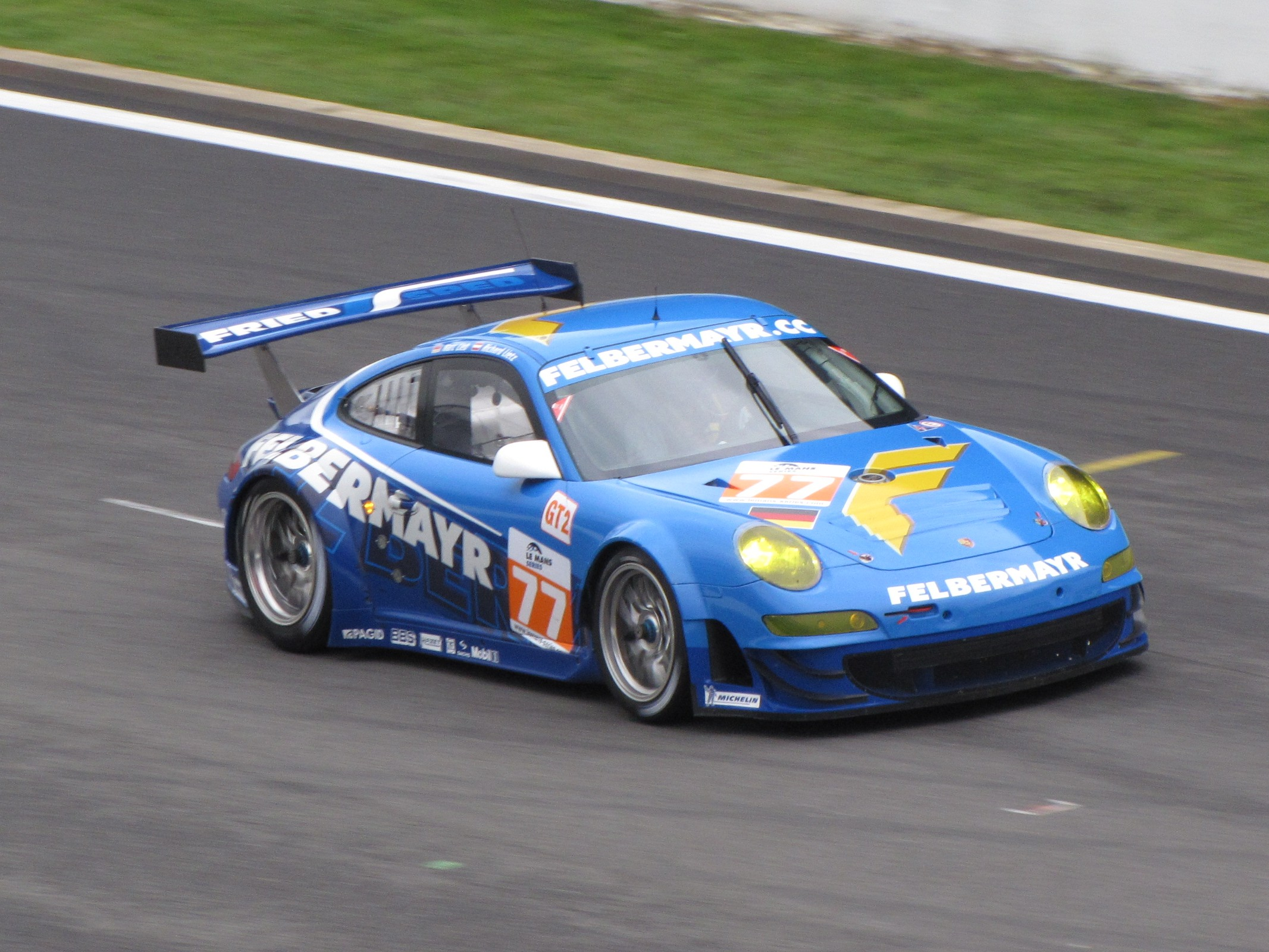
Felbermayr-Proton won the GT2 class title for the second successive season, with drivers Marc Lieb and Richard Lietz.

| Pos | No. | Team | Chassis | Engine | LEC (France) | SPA (Belgium) | ALG (Portugal) | HUN (Hungary) | SIL (United Kingdom) | Total |
|---|---|---|---|---|---|---|---|---|---|---|
| 1 | 77 | (Germany) Team Felbermayr-Proton | Porsche 997 GT3-RSR | Porsche M97/74 4.0 L Flat-6 | 1 | 1 | 3 | 1 | 5 | 87 |
| 2 | 95 | (Italy) AF Corse | Ferrari F430 GT2 | Ferrari F136 4.0 L V8 | 3 | 3 | 2 | 4 | 12 | 66 |
| 3 | 96 | (Italy) AF Corse | Ferrari F430 GT2 | Ferrari F136 4.0 L V8 | Ret | 2 | 1 | 5 | 1 | 59 |
| 4 | 88 | (Germany) Team Felbermayr-Proton | Porsche 997 GT3-RSR | Porsche M97/74 4.0 L Flat-6 | 2 | 8 | 5 | 7 | 10 | 55 |
| 5 | 76 | (France) IMSA Performance Matmut | Porsche 997 GT3-RSR | Porsche M97/74 4.0 L Flat-6 | 7 | 5 | 10 | 3 | 6 | 47 |
| 6 | 91 | (United Kingdom) CRS Racing | Ferrari F430 GT2 | Ferrari F136 4.0 L V8 | Ret | 6 | 8 | 2 | 4 | 40 |
| 7 | 94 | (Italy) AF Corse | Ferrari F430 GT2 | Ferrari F136 4.0 L V8 | 5 | 11 | 6 | 8 | 9 | 38 |
| 8 | 85 | (Netherlands) Spyker Squadron | Spyker C8 Laviolette GT2-R | Audi 4.0 L V8 | 8 | 7 | 9 | 9 | 7 | 38 |
| 9 | 90 | (United Kingdom) CRS Racing | Ferrari F430 GT2 | Ferrari F136 4.0 L V8 | 4 | 15 | 11 | 12 | 13 | 33 |
| 10 | 92 | (United Kingdom) JMW Motorsport | Aston Martin V8 Vantage GT2 | Aston Martin AM05 4.5 L V8 | Ret | NC | 4 | 6 | 3 | 30 |
| 11 | 78 | (Germany) BMW Team Schnitzer | BMW M3 GT2 | BMW S65B40 4.0 L V8 | 6 | 12 | | | 8 | 26 |
| 12 | 75 | (Belgium) Prospeed Competition | Porsche 997 GT3-RSR | Porsche M97/74 4.0 L Flat-6 | Ret | 9 | Ret | Ret | 2 | 19 |
| 13 | 79 | (Germany) BMW Team Schnitzer | BMW M3 GT2 | BMW 4.0 L V8 | | 4 | | | | 18 |
| 14 | 89 | (Germany) Hankook Team Farnbacher | Ferrari F430 GT2 | Ferrari F136 4.0 L V8 | Ret | 10 | 7 | 10 | Ret | 17 |
| 15 | 86 | (Germany) Team Felbermayr-Proton | Porsche 997 GT3-RSR | Porsche M97/74 4.0 L Flat-6 | | | | 11 | | 4 |
| 16 | 99 | (United Arab Emirates) Gulf Team First | Lamborghini Gallardo LP560 | Lamborghini CEH 5.2 L V10 | | | | | 11 | 4 |
| 17 | 98 | (Belgium) Prospeed Competition | Porsche 997 GT3-RSR | Porsche M97/74 4.0 L Flat-6 | | 13 | | | | 3 |
| 18 | 93 | (United Kingdom) JWA Racing | Porsche 997 GT3-RSR | Porsche M97/74 4.0 L Flat-6 | | 14 | | | | 3 |

== Drivers Championships ==
=== LMP1 Standings ===
| Pos | Driver | LEC (France) | SPA (Belgium) | ALG (Portugal) | HUN (Hungary) | SIL (United Kingdom) | Points |
|---|---|---|---|---|---|---|---|
| 1 | (France) Stéphane Sarrazin | 4 | 2 | 1 | 4 | 2 | 78 |
| 2 | (France) Nicolas Lapierre | 4 | Ret | 1 | 4 | 2 | 63 |
| 3 | (Italy) Rinaldo Capello | 1 | 3 | | | 3 | 57 |
| 4 | (Belgium) Vanina Ickx | 6 | 8 | 3 | 3 | 6 | 55 |
| 4 | (France) Franck Mailleux | 6 | 8 | 3 | 3 | 6 | 55 |
| 4 | (France) Pierre Ragues | 6 | 8 | 3 | 3 | 6 | 55 |
| 5 | (Switzerland) Neel Jani | 7 | Ret | 2 | 2 | 5 | 52 |
| 5 | (France) Nicolas Prost | 7 | Ret | 2 | 2 | 5 | 52 |
| 6 | (United Kingdom) Allan McNish | 1 | 3 | | | Ret | 45 |
| 7 | (Italy) Andrea Belicchi | 3 | 6 | 4 | Ret | 10 | 44 |
| 7 | (France) Jean-Christophe Boullion | 3 | 6 | 4 | Ret | 10 | 44 |
| 8 | (France) Olivier Panis | 4 | Ret | 1 | 4 | | 39 |
| 9 | (United Kingdom) Greg Mansell | 8 | | | 1 | 7 | 34 |
| 9 | (United Kingdom) Leo Mansell | 8 | | | 1 | 7 | 34 |
| 10 | (Mexico) Adrián Fernández | 2 | | | | NC | 28 |
| 10 | (Switzerland) Harold Primat | 2 | | | | NC | 28 |
| 10 | (Germany) Stefan Mücke | 2 | | | | | 28 |
| 11 | (United Kingdom) Anthony Davidson | | 4 | | | 1 | 27 |
| 12 | (United Kingdom) Guy Smith | 3 | | | | | 23 |
| 13 | (Germany) Timo Bernhard | | 5 | | | 3 | 23 |
| 14 | (France) Sébastien Bourdais | | 1 | | | | 18 |
| 14 | (France) Simon Pagenaud | | 1 | | | | 18 |
| 14 | (Portugal) Pedro Lamy | | 1 | | | | 18 |

=== LMP2 Standings ===
| Pos | Driver | LEC (France) | SPA (Belgium) | ALG (Portugal) | HUN (Hungary) | SIL (United Kingdom) | Points |
|---|---|---|---|---|---|---|---|
| 1 | (Brazil) Thomas Erdos | 3 | 2 | 1 | 4 | 4 | 75 |
| 1 | (United Kingdom) Mike Newton | 3 | 2 | 1 | 4 | 4 | 75 |
| 2 | (United Kingdom) Jonny Kane | 1 | Ret | Ret | 1 | 1 | 69 |
| 2 | (United Kingdom) Nick Leventis | 1 | Ret | Ret | 1 | 1 | 69 |
| 2 | (United Kingdom) Danny Watts | 1 | Ret | Ret | 1 | 1 | 69 |
| 3 | (France) Matthieu Lahaye | 4 | 4 | 4 | 3 | 6 | 53 |
| 3 | (France) Jacques Nicolet | 4 | 4 | 4 | 3 | 6 | 53 |
| 4 | (France) Richard Hein | 2 | 3 | Ret | 7 | 3 | 52 |
| 4 | (France) Guillaume Moreau | 2 | 3 | Ret | 7 | 3 | 52 |
| 5 | (Norway) Thor-Christian Ebbesvik | 5 | Ret | 2 | 5 | 8 | 46 |
| 5 | (Saudi Arabia) Karim Ojjeh | 5 | Ret | 2 | 5 | 8 | 46 |
| 6 | (Portugal) Miguel Amaral | Ret | 1 | Ret | 2 | 2 | 44 |
| 6 | (France) Olivier Pla | Ret | 1 | Ret | 2 | 2 | 44 |

=== FLM Standings ===
| Pos | Driver | LEC (France) | SPA (Belgium) | ALG (Portugal) | HUN (Hungary) | SIL (United Kingdom) | Points |
|---|---|---|---|---|---|---|---|
| 1 | (Belgium) Andrea Barlesi | 3 | Ret | 2 | 1 | 4 | 59 |
| 1 | (France) Gary Chalandon | 3 | Ret | 2 | 1 | 4 | 59 |
| 2 | (Switzerland) Steve Zacchia | 4 | 1 | Ret | 3 | 2 | 57 |
| 3 | (Italy) Alessandro Cicognani | 3 | Ret | 2 | 1 | 4 | 46 |
| 4 | (Italy) Luca Moro | 4 | 1 | Ret | 3 | 2 | 44 |
| 5 | (Austria) Dominik Kraihamer | Ret | 2 | 3 | 4 | 5 | 41 |
| 5 | (Belgium) Nicolas de Crem | Ret | 2 | 3 | 4 | 5 | 41 |

=== GT1 Standings ===
| Pos | Driver | LEC (France) | SPA (Belgium) | ALG (Portugal) | HUN (Hungary) | SIL (United Kingdom) | Points |
|---|---|---|---|---|---|---|---|
| 1 | (Switzerland) Gabriele Gardel | 1 | 4 | 1 | 1 | 1 | 97 |
| 1 | (France) Patrice Goueslard | 1 | 4 | 1 | 1 | 1 | 97 |
| 2 | (Brazil) Fernando Rees | | 4 | 1 | 1 | 1 | 64 |
| 3 | (France) Julien Canal | 1 | | | | | 33 |
| 4 | (Belgium) Julien Schroyen | | 6 | 2 | Ret | | 25 |
| 4 | (Netherlands) Carlo van Dam | | 6 | 2 | Ret | | 25 |
| 5 | (Belgium) Bas Leinders | | 1 | | | | 18 |
| 5 | (Finland) Markus Palttala | | 1 | | | | 18 |

=== GT2 Standings ===
| Pos | Driver | LEC (France) | SPA (Belgium) | ALG (Portugal) | HUN (Hungary) | SIL (United Kingdom) | Points |
|---|---|---|---|---|---|---|---|
| 1 | (Germany) Marc Lieb | 1 | 1 | 3 | 1 | 5 | 87 |
| 1 | (Austria) Richard Lietz | 1 | 1 | 3 | 1 | 5 | 87 |
| 2 | (France) Jean Alesi | 3 | 3 | 2 | 4 | 12 | 66 |
| 2 | (Italy) Giancarlo Fisichella | 3 | 3 | 2 | 4 | 12 | 66 |
| 2 | (Finland) Toni Vilander | 3 | 3 | 2 | 4 | 12 | 66 |
| 3 | (Austria) Martin Ragginger | 2 | 8 | 5 | 7 | 10 | 55 |
| 3 | (Germany) Christian Ried | 2 | 8 | 5 | 7 | 10 | 55 |
| 4 | (Italy) Gianmaria Bruni | Ret | 2 | 1 | | 1 | 50 |
| 4 | (Brazil) Jaime Melo | Ret | 2 | 1 | | 1 | 50 |
| 5 | (France) Patrick Pilet | 7 | 5 | 10 | 3 | 6 | 47 |
| 5 | (France) Raymond Narac | 7 | 5 | 10 | 3 | 6 | 47 |
| 6 | (United Kingdom) Andrew Kirkaldy | Ret | 6 | 8 | 2 | 4 | 40 |
| 6 | (United Kingdom) Tim Mullen | Ret | 6 | 8 | 2 | 4 | 40 |
| 7 | (Argentina) Luis Pérez Companc | 5 | 11 | 6 | 8 | 9 | 38 |
| 7 | (Argentina) Matías Russo | 5 | 11 | 6 | 8 | 9 | 38 |
| 8 | (United Kingdom) Peter Dumbreck | 8 | 7 | 9 | 9 | 7 | 38 |
| 9 | (United States) Patrick Long | 2 | 8 | | | | 35 |
