= Pierre Ragues =

French racing driver

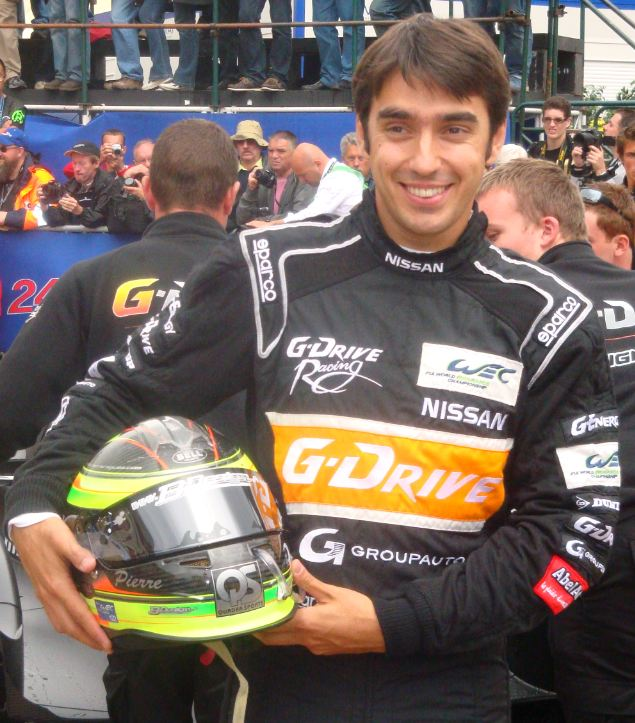
- Ragues at the 2012 24 Hours of Le Mans
- Nationality: (France) French
- Born: Pierre René Gilbert Ragues; 10 January 1984 (age 42) Caen, France

FIA World Endurance Championship career
- Debut season: 2012
- Current team: Signatech-Nissan
- Categorisation: FIA Gold (until 2012); FIA Silver (2013–)
- Car number: 26

Previous series
- 2011 2011 2007 2006, 08–11 2004–2005 2004–05 2003 2003: Intercontinental Le Mans Cup; American Le Mans Series; International Formula Master; Le Mans Series; Eurocup Formula Renault; French Formula Renault; FIA GT Championship; Formula Renault Campus
24 Hours of Le Mans career
- Years: 2006, 2008–2020
- Teams: Paul Belmondo Racing, Saulnier Racing, Signature Team, OAK Racing
- Best finish: 4th overall / 3rd in class (2017)

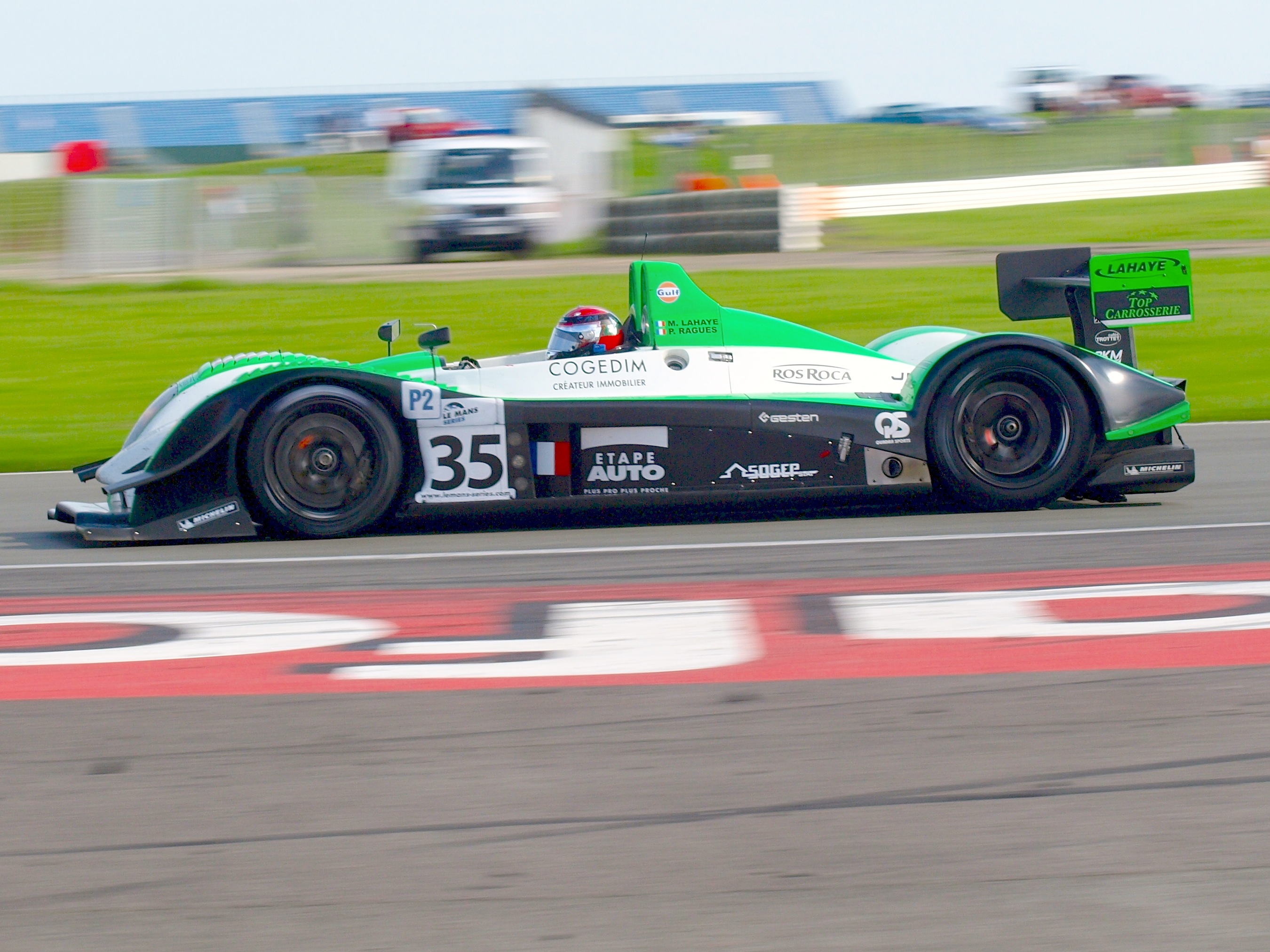
Ragues driving for Saulnier Racing at the 2008 1000km of Silverstone.

Pierre René Gilbert Ragues (born 10 January 1984 in Caen) is a French racing driver.

A veteran of the LMP2 class, Ragues competed in the FIA World Endurance Championship and was 2013 European Le Mans Series champion for Signatech Alpine. He later switched to rallying, winning the FIA R-GT Cup in 2021. Since 2026, he presides the French Federation of Automobile Sport (FFSA).

== Career ==
=== Karting ===
Debuting in karting in 1994, Ragues was second in the Monaco Kart Cup in Formula A in 2001, and third in the French Elite Championship. Since starting to race cars, he has continued to compete in karts.

=== Single-seaters ===
Ragues started racing cars in 2003 when he took part in Formula Renault Campus in France, finishing runner-up to dominant champion Laurent Groppi and scoring one race win. He also took part in the 2003 Spa 24 Hours in a Paul Belmondo Racing-run Chrysler Viper GTS-R. For the following years, he raced in French Formula Renault, finishing 12th and 15th overall in the two seasons.

After racing sportscars in 2006, Ragues took part in International Formula Master in 2007, finishing 14th overall with one podium finish. In 2007 he also won the Euro F3000 Sprint race with the Autosport Team.

=== Sportscars ===
In 2006, Ragues started in sports car racing, contesting the LMP2 class of the Le Mans Series and 24 Hours of Le Mans for Paul Belmondo Racing. After his brief return to single-seaters, in 2008, he raced for Saulnier Racing and finished fifth in the Le Mans Series LMP2 drivers' standings and third in class at Le Mans.

2009 saw Ragues start his relationship with the Signature team. They finished 11th overall and tenth in LMP1 at the 2009 24 Hours of Le Mans and seventh in the Le Mans Series. Signature switched to a Lola-Aston Martin B09/60 for 2010, and the team finished second in the LMS teams' championship with their drivers in fourth place.

In 2011, Ragues switched back to the Saulnier team, now operating as OAK Racing, before returning to Signature in 2012, now racing as Signatech-Nissan. He finished tenth overall and fourth in LMP2 at the 2012 24 Hours of Le Mans.

== Racing record ==
=== Complete Eurocup Formula Renault 2.0 results ===
(key) (Races in bold indicate pole position; races in italics indicate fastest lap)

Year	Entrant	1	2	3	4	5	6	7	8	9	10	11	12	13	14	15	16	DC	Points
2005	Epsilon Sport	ZOL; 1	ZOL; 2	VAL; 1 Ret	VAL; 2; 22	LMS; 1 Ret	LMS; 2; 9	BIL; 1	BIL; 2	OSC; 1; 11	OSC; 2; 24	DON; 1	DON; 2	EST; 1; 33	EST; 2; 17	MNZ; 1	MNZ; 2	31st	2

=== Complete Le Mans Series/European Le Mans Series results ===
Year	Entrant	Class	Chassis	Engine	1	2	3	4	5	6	Rank	Points
2006	Paul Belmondo Racing	LMP2	Courage C65	Ford (Mecachrome) 3.4L V8	IST; 5	SPA; 5	NÜR; Ret	DON; Ret	JAR; 5		15th	12
2008	Saulnier Racing	LMP2	Pescarolo 01	Judd DB 3.4 L V8	CAT; 5	MON; 5	SPA; 4	NÜR; 2	SIL; 9		8th	21
2009	Signature Plus	LMP2	Courage-Oreca LC70E	Judd GV5.5 S2 5.5 L V10	CAT; 4	SPA; 9	ALG; 6	NUR; 5	SIL; 7		10th	14
2010	Signature Plus	LMP1	Lola-Aston Martin B09/60	Aston Martin AM04 6.0 L V12	CAS; 6	SPA; 8	ALG; 3	HUN; 3	SIL; 6		4th	57
2011	OAK Racing	LMP1	OAK Pescarolo 01	Judd DB 3.4 L V8	CAS	SPA; Ret	IMO; 8	SIL; 5	EST		NC	0
2013	Signatech Alpine	LMP2	Alpine A450	Nissan VK45DE 4.5 L V8	SIL; 4	IMO; 2	RBR; 2	HUN; 1	LEC; 4		1st	85
2014	Newblood by Morand Racing	LMP2	Morgan LMP2	Judd HK 3.6 L V8	SIL	IMO	RBR; 5	LEC; 1	EST; 2		6th	53
2018	Duqueine Engineering	LMP2	Oreca 07	Gibson GK428 4.2 L V8	LEC; 3	MNZ; 6	RBR; DSQ	SIL; 7	SPA; 5‡	**ALG**; Ret	11th	35
2019	Duqueine Engineering	LMP2	Oreca 07	Gibson GK428 4.2 L V8	LEC; 3	MNZ; 6	CAT; 4	SIL; Ret	SPA; 5	ALG; Ret	9th	45
2021	AF Corse	LMGTE	Ferrari 488 GTE Evo	Ferrari F154CB 3.9 L Turbo V8	CAT	RBR	LEC	MNZ	SPA	ALG; 9	NC†	0

^{‡} Half points awarded as less than 75% of race distance was completed.
^{†} As Ragues was a guest driver, he was ineligible to score points.

=== Complete 24 Hours of Le Mans results ===
Year	Team	Co-Drivers	Car	Class	Laps	Pos.	Class Pos.
2006	(France) Paul Belmondo Racing	(France) Claude-Yves Gosselin (Saudi Arabia) Karim Ojjeh	Courage C65-Ford	LMP2	84	DNF	DNF
2008	(France) Saulnier Racing	(China) Cheng Congfu (France) Matthieu Lahaye	Pescarolo 01-Judd	LMP2	333	18th	**3rd**
2009	(France) Signature-Plus	(France) Franck Mailleux (France) Didier André	Courage-Oreca LC70E-Judd	LMP1	344	11th	10th
2010	(France) Signature-Plus	(France) Franck Mailleux (Belgium) Vanina Ickx	Lola-Aston Martin B09/60	LMP1	302	DNF	DNF
2011	(France) OAK Racing	(France) Guillaume Moreau (Portugal) Tiago Monteiro	OAK Pescarolo 01 Evo-Judd	LMP1	80	DNF	DNF
2012	(France) Signatech-Nissan	(France) Nelson Panciatici (Russia) Roman Rusinov	Oreca 03-Nissan	LMP2	351	10th	4th
2013	(France) Signatech-Alpine	(France) Nelson Panciatici (France) Tristan Gommendy	Alpine A450-Nissan	LMP2	317	14th	8th
2014	(France) Larbre Compétition	(Japan) Keiko Ihara (United States) Ricky Taylor	Morgan LMP2-Judd	LMP2	341	14th	9th
2015	(Switzerland) Team SARD-Morand	(United Kingdom) Oliver Webb (Switzerland) Zoël Amberg	Morgan LMP2 Evo-SARD	LMP2	162	DNF	DNF
2016	(France) Larbre Compétition	(France) Jean-Philippe Belloc (Japan) Yutaka Yamagishi	Chevrolet Corvette C7.R	GTE; Am	316	37th	8th
2017	(France) Signatech Alpine Matmut	(France) Nelson Panciatici (Brazil) André Negrão	Alpine A470-Gibson	LMP2	362	4th	**3rd**
2019	(France) Duqueine Engineering	(France) Nico Jamin (France) Romain Dumas	Oreca 07-Gibson	LMP2	363	12th	7th
2020	(France) Signatech Alpine Elf	(Brazil) André Negrão (France) Thomas Laurent	Alpine A470-Gibson	LMP2	367	8th	4th

=== Complete FIA World Endurance Championship results ===
Year	Entrant	Class	Chassis	Engine	1	2	3	4	5	6	7	8	Rank	Points
2012	Signatech-Nissan	LMP2	Oreca 03	Nissan VK45DE 4.5 L V8	SEB	SPA; 12	LMS; 4	SIL; 3	SÃO; 7	BHR; 4	FUJ; EX	SHA; 7	6th†	60†
2013	Signatech-Alpine	LMP2	Alpine A450	Nissan VK45DE 4.5 L V8	SIL	SPA	LMS; 8	SÃO	COA	FUJ	SHA	BHR	NC	0
2014	Larbre Compétition	LMP2	Morgan LMP2	Judd HK 3.6 L V8	SIL	SPA	LMS; 9	COA	FUJ	SHA	BHR	SÃO	NC	0
2015	Team SARD Morand	LMP2	Morgan LMP2 Evo	SARD (Judd) 3.6 L V8	SIL	SPA; 2	LMS	NÜR	COA	FUJ	SHA	BHR	5th*	18*
2019–20	Signatech Alpine Elf	LMP2	Alpine A470	Gibson GK428 4.2 L V8	SIL; 2	FUJ; 6	SHA; 4	BHR; 4	COA; 6	SPA; Ret	LMS; 3	BHR; 5	8th	109

* Season still in progress.
† There was no drivers championship that year, the result indicates rank in the LMP2 Trophy.

Sporting positions
Preceded by Mathias Beche; Pierre Thiriet	Le Mans Series Champion; 2013 with: Nelson Panciatici	Succeeded by Paul-Loup Chatin; Nelson Panciatici; Oliver Webb
