= Lola B08/80 =

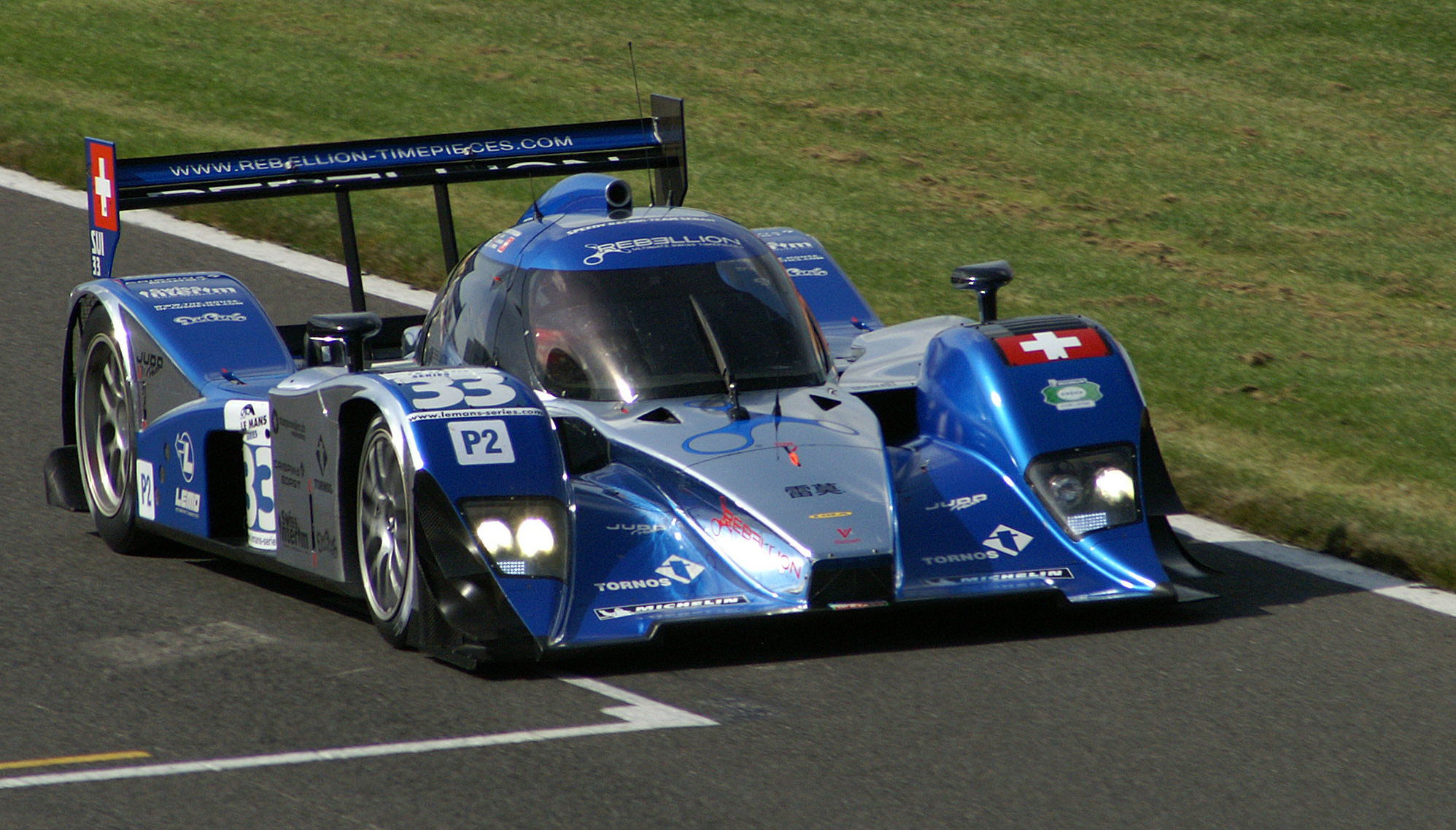
- The No. 33 Speedy Racing Team Sebah B08/80 during the 2009 1000 km of Silverstone.
- Category: Le Mans Prototype LMP2
- Constructor: Lola Cars International
- Designer: Julian Sole

Technical specifications
- Chassis: Carbon fibre monocoque
- Suspension (front): Double wishbone, push-rod actuated coil springs over dampers
- Suspension (rear): Double wishbone, push-rod actuated coil springs over dampers
- Engine: Judd DB 3.4L N/A V8; Mazda MZR-R 2.0L T/C I4; HPD HR28TT 2.8L Turbocharged V6; Mazda SkyActiv 2.2L Turbocharged I4 Diesel mid-engined, longitudinally mounted
- Transmission: Hewland/Lola 6-speed sequential manual
- Weight: Appr. 825 kg (1,819 lb)
- Fuel: BP
- Tyres: Michelin

Competition history
- Notable entrants: (Switzerland) Speedy Racing Team Sebah, (United Kingdom) Ray Mallock, (United States) B-K Motorsport, (United States) Dyson Racing, (Italy) Racing Box (Germany) Lotus (United States) Speedsource Engineering/Mazda
- Debut: 2008 1000 km of Catalunya
Races	Wins	Poles	F/Laps
38	1	1	0
- Constructors' Championships: 1 (LMP2)
- Drivers' Championships: 1 (LMP2)

The Lola B08/80 is a Le Mans Prototype built by Lola Cars International. It is effectively the LMP2 version of the larger Lola B08/60; they are the first closed-cockpit sports prototypes built by Lola since the T92/10 of 1992. The B08/80 is optimised for the smaller engines and lighter weight of the LMP2 category in comparison to the larger and heavier B08/60.

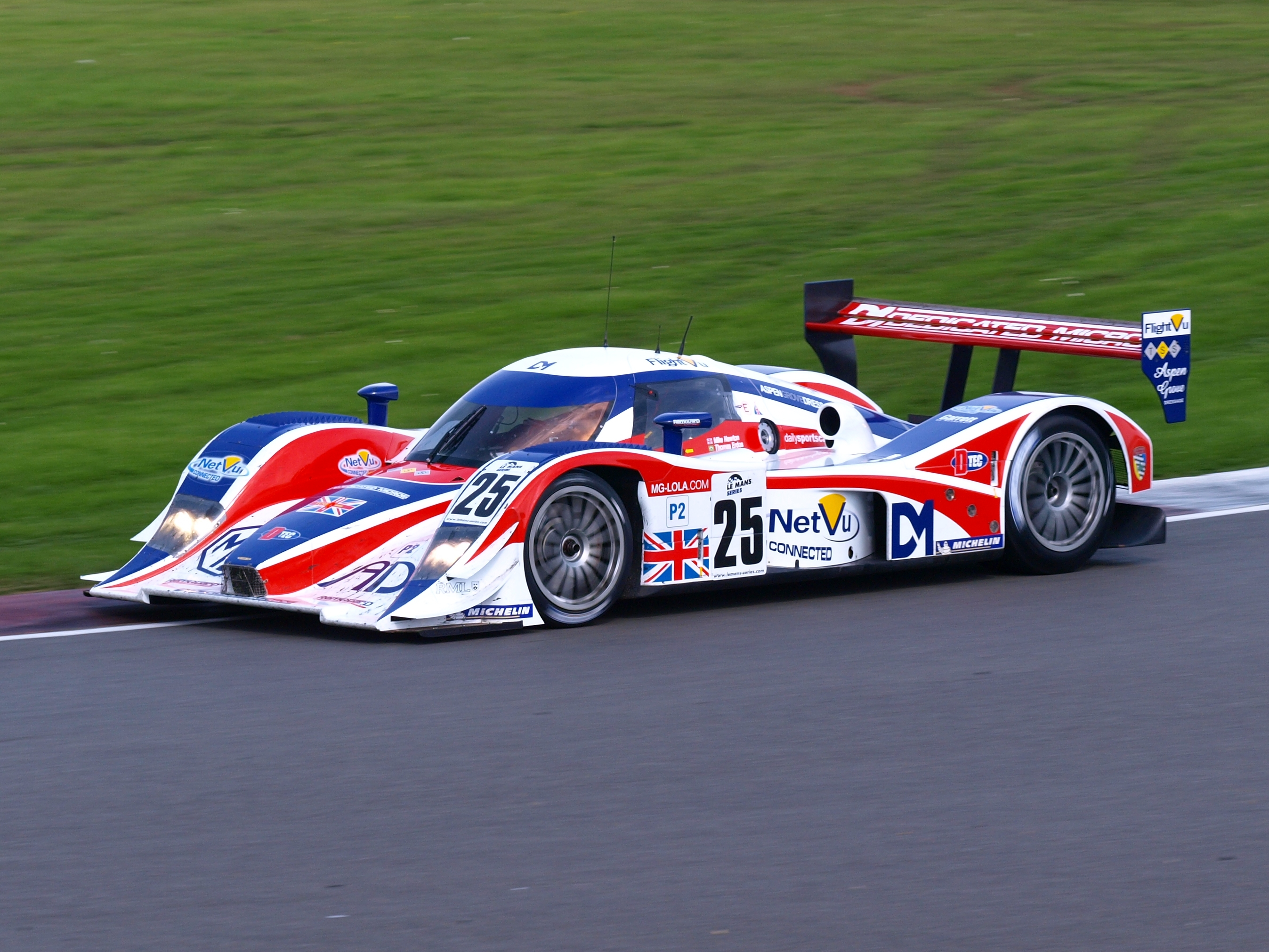
Ray Mallock's MG-Lola EX265C

The first chassis of the B08/80 is used by the joint Speedy Racing Team and Sebah Automotive outfits in the Le Mans Series as well as at 24 Hours of Le Mans. The team's car uses the latest V8 engine from Judd. A second car was entered by B-K Motorsports and Mazda in the American Le Mans Series, debuting at the Petit Le Mans in October 2008, while a third B08/80 chassis was sold to Ray Mallock and completed with parts from the team's former B05/40 to create the MG-Lola EX265C for the Le Mans Series. B-K Motorsports closed shop in late 2008 and sold their car to Dyson Racing. 2009 LMS season saw the B08/80 being the 2nd fastest LMP2, behind the Essex Porsche.

== Competition ==
Dyson Racing runs two upgraded B09/86s in the 2009 American Le Mans Series in the LMP2 class. The #20 car enjoyed their first class win in the new Lola/Mazda coupe at the Lime Rock Park race.

For 2010, Dyson scaled back to one car but was arguably more successful, bringing the Lola B09/86 its first overall pole at Laguna Seca and its first overall win at Mid-Ohio.

In the Le Mans Series in Europe, RML won the 2010 Le Mans Series LMP2 Teams and Drivers' Championships with their Lola B08/80, highlighted by a LMP2 class win at the 2010 1000 km of Algarve.

In the 2011 American Le Mans Series season Dyson racing upgraded their B09/86s to LMP1 standard and started the season with the #16 car. The #20 car returned from the 2011 Northeast Grand Prix onwards and they scored an overall win at the 2011 Baltimore Grand Prix. Even though they never won a race, the #16 car won the ALMS LMP1 championship.

Level 5 Motorsports ran their upgraded B11/80's in the 2011 Intercontinental Le Mans Cup and the 2011 24 Hours of Le Mans except for Silverstone and Zhuhai. They finished third in LMP2 and tenth overall at Le Mans. Level 5 switched to the HPD ARX-01g for Petit Le Mans and continued with Honda power in 2012.

Until recently, the Lola B12/80 was still common in Le Mans Prototype racing. Gulf Racing ran a pair of B12/80s in the WEC; Dempsey Racing ran a B12/80 in the ALMS; and finally, Black Swan Racing ran the former 2011 Level 5 B11/80.

In the 2012 European Le Mans Series season, Status Grand Prix ran an upgraded B12/80, finishing 6th in the teams championship with 15 points. These came from a 3rd place at the 2012 6 Hours of Castellet.

By 2013, all teams had retired their Lola B12/80s due to uncertainty over parts support from Lola.

In 2014, Mazda and Speedsource were announced as the newest customers of two Lola LMP2s using the SkyActiv-D engine.

For the 2016 WeatherTech SportsCar Championship season, Mazda entered a B08/80 with livery based on that of the Mazdaspeed 787B C2 which won the 1991 24 Hours of Le Mans to commemorate the 25th anniversary of that victory.
