= Tim Greaves =

British racing driver (born 1956)

- Nationality: (United Kingdom) British
- Born: 18 April 1956 (age 70) Ramsbottom, Lancashire (England)
- Relatives: Jacob Greaves (son)

Le Mans Series
- Categorisation: FIA Silver (until 2013); FIA Bronze (2014–)
- Years active: 2004–2010
- Teams: Team Bruichladdich; Rollcentre Racing; G-Force Racing
- Starts: 21
- Best finish: 17th in 2010

Previous series
- 2006 2006 ?–2006 ?–? ?–?: ALMS; Radical World Cup; Radical SR8 Championship; Radical Clubsport; Radical Prosport

Championship titles
- 2005 2000: Radical SR8 Championship; Radical Prosport

John Timothy Greaves (born 18 April 1956) is a British former racing driver and the team principal of Greaves Motorsport. He raced in various Radical series during the 2000s and also drove in the Le Mans Series and 24 Hours of Le Mans between 2004 and 2010.

== Career ==
=== Early career ===
Greaves, born in Ramsbottom, Lancashire, was the Radical Prosport champion along with Michael Vergers in 2000. Greaves entered the 1000 km of Silverstone, part of the Le Mans Endurance Series (LMES), for the first time in 2004; he drove alongside Frank Hahn and Jean-François Leroch in a G-Force Racing-entered Pilbeam MP84. However, it was not a successful debut; the team finished the race, but the 121 laps they completed were not enough for them to be classified. Although he was also entered by the team at the 1000 km of Spa, he did not actually compete in the race. That year, he also finished runner-up in the Radical Clubsport series.

In 2005, Greaves once again drove for G-Force Racing at the 1000 km of Silverstone, alongside Hahn and Leroch in a Courage C65; this time, the team finished 30th overall, and eighth in the LMP2 category. He was entered in a Courage C65 by Renstal de Bokkenrijders at the 1000 km of Nürburgring, but did not compete. He drove once more for G-Force in the 1000 km of Istanbul; however, accident damage forced the team to retire after 46 laps. He won the Radical SR8 Championship that year, being partnered by Nick Dove.

=== 2006–2007 ===
For 2006, he remained in the Radical SR8 Championship, but also entered the full Le Mans Series season. For the LMS, he joined Rollcentre Racing, and drove a Radical SR9-Judd alongside João Barbosa and Martin Short in the opening round, which was the 1000 km of Istanbul; the team retired after 120 laps, ten minutes before the end of the race. For the 1000 km of Spa, Greaves and Short were joined by Gregor Fisken, but the team retired again, this time after 67 laps. Following these two unsuccessful races, Greaves set up his own team; using sponsorship money from the Bruichladdich brewery, the team was known as Team Bruichladdich Radical, and Stuart Moseley was selected to partner Greaves, with the duo driving a Radical SR9-AER. The team took 15th overall, and fifth in the LMP2 class, on their debut at the 1000 km of Nürburgring. At the 1000 km of Donington, Greaves and Moseley were joined by Ben Devlin; the team retired after 151 laps. Having competed in the inaugural Radical World Cup, Moseley and Greaves then entered the LMS finale, which was the 1000 km of Jarama; however, they retired again, this time after 27 laps. Greaves finished his season by competing in the Petit Le Mans, part of the American Le Mans Series; he drove alongside Devlin and Gunnar van der Steur for van der Steur Racing, but retired after six laps with valve trouble. He was classified 28th in the LMS, level with Moseley and Tony Burgess.

In 2007, Bruichladdich Radical entered the Le Mans Series from the start; Greaves and Moseley entered in the opening round, which was the 1000 km of Monza, but retired after three laps. Robin Liddell joined the team for the 1000 km of Valencia, and they finished ninth overall, and third in the LMP2 category. Following this event, the team participated in the 24 Hours of Le Mans for the first time, however, Greaves crashed out after 90 minutes, forcing the team to withdraw. The following LMS race, which was the 1000 km of Nürburgring, was little more successful; Greaves and Moseley finished 35th, and ninth in class, after a starter motor problem had cost them around 30 minutes. A retirement at the 1000 km of Spa followed, due to engine failure after 81 laps, before the season finale, the 1000 km of Silverstone saw the team take 14th overall and seventh in class; Jacob Greaves filling the third driver's slot for the team. Greaves finished joint-nineteenth in the LMP2 driver's standings with eight points.

=== 2009–2010 ===
Having not raced in 2008, Greaves returned to the cockpit in 2009 for the 1000 km of Spa, which was the second round of the LMS season; partnering Pierre Bruneau and Jonathan Coleman, but the team were disqualified from the event. Marc Rostan partnered Greaves and Bruneau at the 24 Hours of Le Mans, but retired from the race after just over fourteen and a half hours, having completed 91 laps. At the 1000 km of Algarve, Greaves and Bruneau were partnered by Francesco Sini, but could only finish 25th overall, and tenth in class. Having sat out the 1000 km of Nürburgring, Greaves returned for the 1000 km of Silverstone, the season finale; the team finished 16th overall, and sixth in class. Greaves was classified joint-28th in the LMP2 standings, with eight points.

In 2010, Greaves' team ended their association with Radical, and replaced the SR9 with a LMP2 class Ginetta-Zytek GZ09S/2; Greaves, Karim Ojjeh and Thor-Christian Ebbesvik were named as the team's regular drivers, resulting in the team being known as Team Bruichladdich. The team's first race with the car came at the LMS opener, the 8 Hours of Castellet, and they finished twelfth overall, fifth in class. The 1000 km of Spa proved to be less successful; the team suffered a blown engine during qualifying, and Ebbesvik crashed out of the race after 15 laps. For the 24 Hours of Le Mans, Gary Chalandon replaced Ebbesvik, and the team finished tenth overall, fifth in the LMP2 class. Next up was the 1000 km of Algarve, and Ebbesvik returned to the team; fifth overall, and second in class, for their first class podium of the season. The 1000 km of Hungaroring saw another fifth place overall, although mechanical difficulties with the LMP1-class cars meant that this also equated to fifth in class. The season finale, which was the 1000 km of Silverstone, saw the team end the season with a 19th overall, and eighth in class. Greaves finished the season ranked 17th in the LMP2 Driver's Championship, with 32 points, his best result to date.

=== 24 Hours of Le Mans results ===
Year	Team	Co-Drivers	Car	Class	Laps	Pos.	Class Pos.
2007	(United Kingdom) Team Bruichladdich Radical	(United Kingdom) Stuart Moseley (United Kingdom) Robin Liddell	Radical SR9-AER	LMP2	16	DNF	DNF
2009	(United Kingdom) Bruichladdich-Bruneau Team	(France) Pierre Bruneau (France) Marc Rostan	Radical SR9-AER	LMP2	91	DNF	DNF
2010	(United Kingdom) Team Bruichladdich	(Saudi Arabia) Karim Ojjeh (France) Gary Chalandon	Ginetta-Zytek GZ09S/2	LMP2	341	10th	5th
