= Greaves Motorsport =

British Motorsport racing team

(United Kingdom) Greaves Motorsport
- Founded: 2006
- Team principal(s): Jacob Greaves
- Current series: European Le Mans Series; 24 Hours of Le Mans
- Former series: FIA World Endurance Championship (2012-2013)
- Noted drivers: Memo Rojas; Kuba Giermaziak; Julien Canal; Gary Hirsch; Jon Lancaster; Bjorn Wirdheim; Tom Kimber-Smith; Matt McMurry; Chris Dyson; Jann Mardenborough; Michael Krumm; Lucas Ordóñez; Alexander Rossi; Alex Brundle; Martin Brundle; Karim Ojjeh; Olivier Lombard; Robin Liddell; Gunnar Jeannette; Ben Devlin; Michael Vergers; Stuart Moseley
- Teams' Championships: 2015 European Le Mans Series; 2011 24 Hours of Le Mans, LM P2 category 2011 Le Mans Series, LM P2 category
- Drivers' Championships: 2015 European Le Mans Series overall champions (Jon Lancaster, Gary Hirsch and Bjorn Wirdheim). 2011 24 Hours of Le Mans, LMP2 category (Karim Ojjeh, Olivier Lombard and Tom Kimber-Smith); 2011 Le Mans Series, LMP2 category (Karim Ojjeh and Tom Kimber-Smith)

Greaves Motorsport is a British racing team, currently competing in the European Le Mans Series and the 24 Hours of Le Mans.

In 2006, Greaves Motorsport, founded and run by Tim Greaves, entered the Le Mans Series (LMS) for the first time, running a Radical SR9 in conjunction with Radical, and competing under the Bruichladdich Radical banner. After four years of Ginetta-Zytek GZ09S/2 in 2010 to replace the old Radical SR9. In 2011, the team became known as Greaves Motorsport, and they switched to the new Zytek Z11SN, winning the LMP2 category of both the 24 Hours of Le Mans and the Le Mans Series. For 2012, they entered the new European Le Mans Series (ELMS) and FEndurance Championship (WEC), finishing third in the LMP2 category of the ELMS, and fifth in the WEC.

== History ==
=== 2006–2007 ===
In 2006, it was announced that Greaves Motorsport would be running the works Radical team in the Le Mans Series (LMS), with Tim Greaves and Stuart Moseley driving a LMP2-class Radical SR9-AER under the Bruichladdich Radical banner. The team entered the 1000 km of Nürburgring, and finished fifteenth overall, fifth in class. Ben Devlin joined the team for the following round, the 1000 km of Donington, but the team retired after 151 laps. Following this race, the team entered Greaves, Moseley, Ben Devlin and Colin McRae in the inaugural round of the Radical World Cup. McRae's weekend proved unsuccessful, as he retired from the first race, and finished eleventh in the second. Having returned to the LMS, the team retired from the season's final race, the 1000 km of Jarama, after 27 laps. Following this, Moseley and Michael Vergers were entered in the American Le Mans Series season finale at Laguna Seca, where they finished 22nd, and fifth in class.

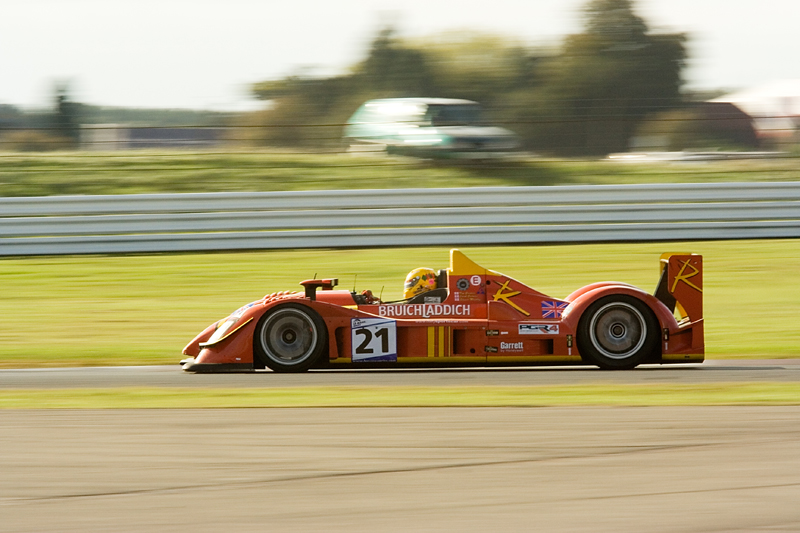
The Bruichladdich Radical SR9-AER at the 2007 1000 km of Silverstone.

In 2007, Bruichladdich Radical competed in the entire LMS season. Having retired at the opening event, the 1000 km of Monza, the team took a ninth place overall finish and third in class at the 1000 km of Valencia; in the latter race, Greaves and Moseley were joined by Robin Liddell. Following this event, the team participated in the 24 Hours of Le Mans for the first time, however, Tim Greaves crashed out after 90 minutes, forcing the team to withdraw. The following LMS race, which was the 1000 km of Nürburgring, was little more successful; Greaves and Moseley finished 35th, and ninth in class, after a starter motor problem had cost the team around 30 minutes. A retirement at the 1000 km of Spa followed, due to engine failure after 81 laps, before the season finale, the 1000 km of Silverstone saw the team take 14th overall and seventh in class; Jacob Greaves filling the third driver's slot for the team. The team finished joint-eighth in the LMP2 team's standings; level with Team LNT and Kruse Motorsport on eight points.

=== 2008–2009 ===
Bruichladdich Radical remained in the Le Mans Series in 2008, but had an all-new driver line-up of Jens Petersen, Jan-Dirk Leuders and Marc Rostan. The season opener, which was the 1000 km of Catalunya, saw the team finish 15th overall, and seventh in class. However, the rest of the season was unsuccessful, as the team did not finish above 30th overall in any of the remaining LMS races, or the 24 Hours of Le Mans; although 30th at the 1000 km of Spa equated to seventh in class, due to attrition. As a result, the team slipped to joint-eleventh in class, with four points.

For 2009, Pierre Bruneau joined the team, and as a result, the team became known as the Bruichladdich-Bruneau Team, with the team continuing to use the AER-engined Radical SR9. The opening round of the season, which was the 1000 km of Catalunya, saw Bruneau, partnered by Moseley and Nigel Greensall, finishing tenth overall, and fourth in the LM P2 category. At the 1000 km of Spa, Tim Greaves and Jonathon Coleman replaced Moseley and Greensall, but the team were disqualified from the event for an unspecified technical infringement. Rostan partnered Greaves and Bruneau at the 24 Hours of Le Mans, but retired from the race after just over fourteen and a half hours, having completed 91 laps. At the 1000 km of Algarve, Greaves and Bruneau were partnered by Francesco Sini, but could only finish 25th overall, and tenth in class. Michael Vergers replaced Greaves at the 1000 km of Nürburgring, but the team retired after 114 laps. Greaves returned for the 1000 km of Silverstone, the season finale; the team finished 16th overall, and sixth in class. The team were classified seventh in the LM P2 standings, with eight points.

=== 2010–2011 ===
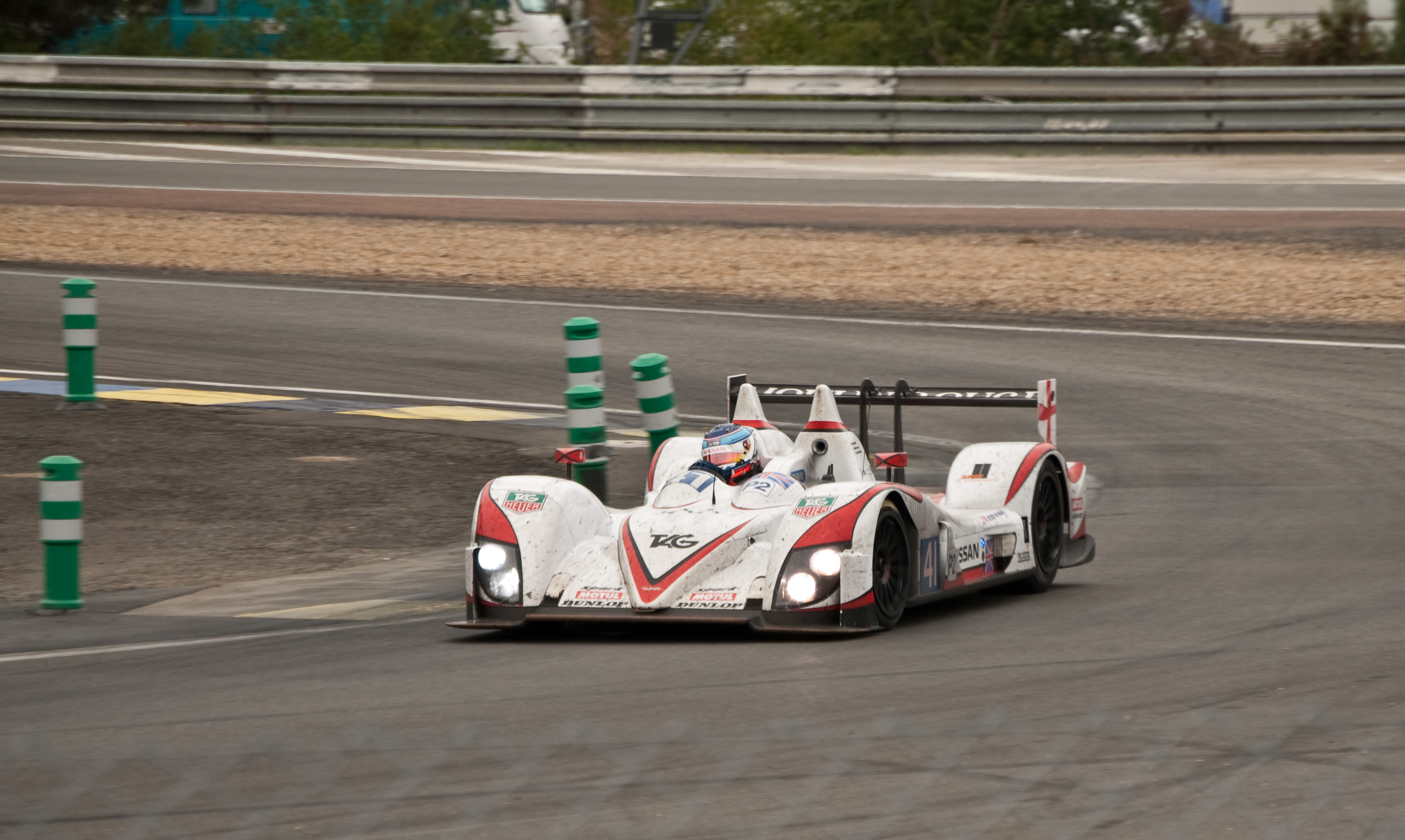
Greaves Motorsport's class-winning Zytek Z11SN at the 24 Hours of Le Mans in 2011.

In 2010, the team ended their association with Radical, and replaced the SR9 with a LM P2 class Ginetta-Zytek GZ09S/2; Tim Greaves, Karim Ojjeh and Thor-Christian Ebbesvik were named as the team's regular drivers, resulting in the team being known as Team Bruichladdich. The team's first race with the car came at the LMS opener, the 8 Hours of Castellet, and they finished twelfth overall, fifth in class. The 1000 km of Spa proved to be less successful; the team suffered a blown engine during qualifying, and Ebbesvik crashed out of the race after 15 laps. For the 24 Hours of Le Mans, Gary Chalandon replaced Ebbesvik, and the team finished tenth overall, fifth in the LM P2 class. Next up was the 1000 km of Algarve, and Ebbesvik returned to the team; fifth overall, and second in class, for their first class podium of the season. The 1000 km of Hungaroring saw another fifth place overall, although mechanical difficulties with the LM P1-class cars meant that this also equated to fifth in class. The season finale, which was the 1000 km of Silverstone, saw the team end the season with a 19th overall, and eighth in class. The team finished the season ranked fifth in the LMP2 Team's Championship, with 46 points.

In 2011, the team changed their name to Greaves Motorsport, and were the first team to use the new LM P2-class Zytek Z11SN-Nissan. With Ojjeh, Chalandon and Tom Kimber-Smith driving the car, the team won the LM P2 class and came third overall at the 6 Hours of Castellet, which was the first round of the season. Although the team struggled at the 1000 km of Spa, finishing 37th overall, and eighth in class, the team won the LM P2 category of the 24 Hours of Le Mans for the first time, and finished eighth overall; Chalandon was replaced by Olivier Lombard from this event onwards. Another eighth place overall, and class victory followed, at the 6 Hours of Imola; the team then won the LM P2 class for the third race in a row at the 6 Hours of Silverstone, this time finishing tenth overall. The team finished the season with a fourth overall, and second in class, at the 6 Hours of Estoril; this meant that the team won the LM P2 Championship, with Kimber-Smith and Ojjeh being crowned as the LM P2 Driver's Champions.

=== 2012–2013 ===
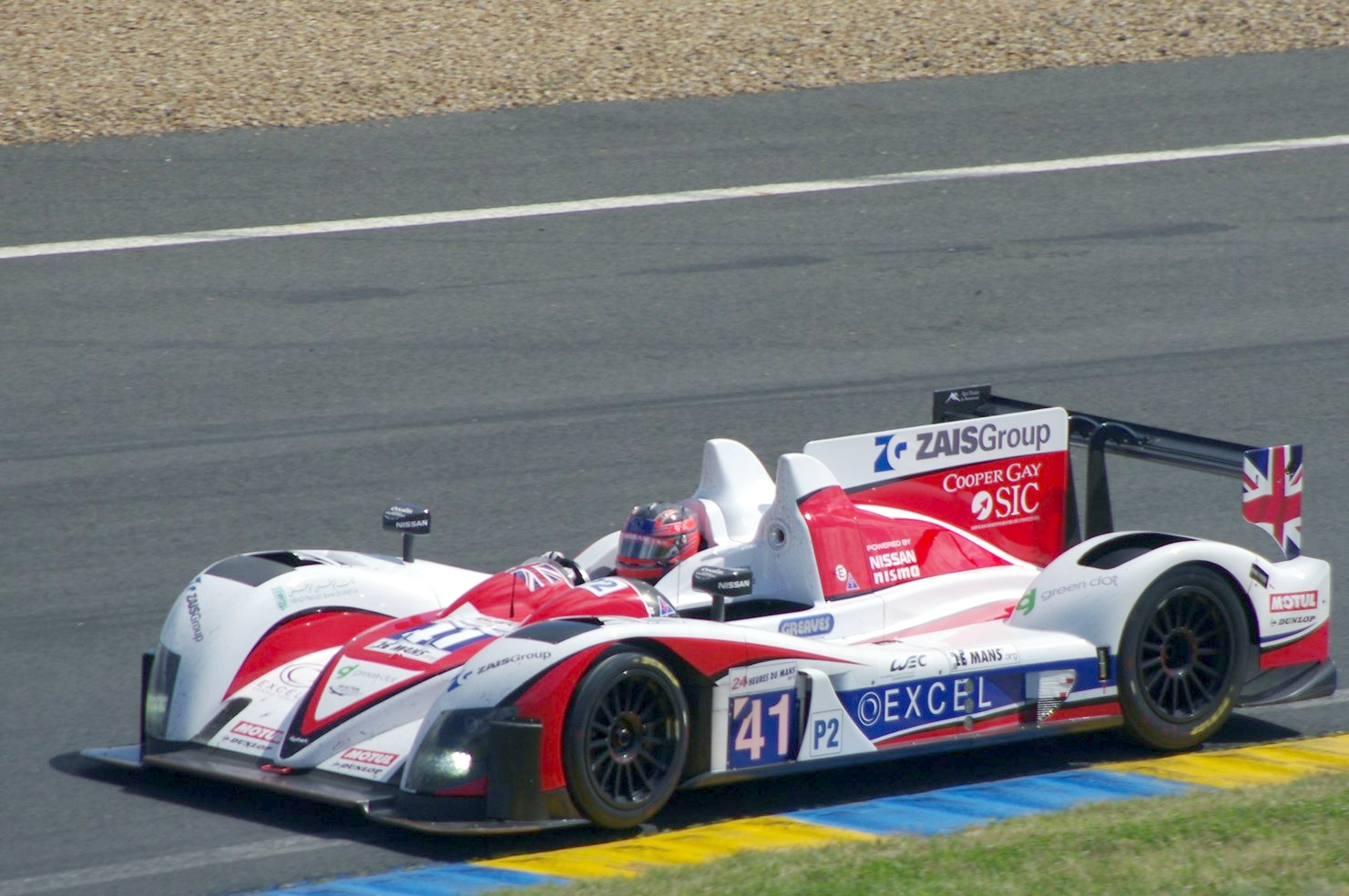
Ricardo González at the 2012 24 Hours of Le Mans in Zytek Z11SN

In 2012, Greaves Motorsport entered both the European Le Mans Series (ELMS) and the new FIA World Endurance Championship (WEC). Kimber-Smith, Alex Brundle and Lucas Ordóñez were hired for the ELMS, whilst Elton Julian, Christian Zugel and Ricardo González were hired for the WEC. The team's first event of the season came at the 12 Hours of Sebring, which formed part of the WEC and the American Le Mans Series (ALMS); the team finished seventh of the WEC runners, and fourth in the LMP2 category. The team then entered the opening round of the ELMS, which was the 6 Hours of Castellet; the team finished fourth overall, and in the LM P2 class. The next event the team entered was the 6 Hours of Spa-Francorchamps, part of the WEC; the team finished 16th overall, and seventh in the LM P2 class. For the 24 Hours of Le Mans, Greaves Motorsport entered two cars; Zugel, Julian and González in the No. 41 car, and Alex Brundle, Martin Brundle and Ordóñez in the No. 42 car. The No. 41 car finished 12th overall, and fifth in class, whilst the No. 42 car finished 15th overall, and eighth in class. Next, the team returned to the ELMS, competing in the 6 Hours of Donington, finishing seventh overall and in the LM P2 class.

The team then entered both cars in the 6 Hours of Silverstone, with the same drivers that had competed in the 24 Hours of Le Mans; the No. 42 car finished 12th overall, and fifth in the LM P2 category, whilst the No. 41 car finished 20th overall, and 13th in class. Greaves Motorsport reverted to a single-car entry for the 6 Hours of São Paulo round of the WEC, with Roberto González replacing his brother Ricardo (whom had been selected to drive for Level 5 Motorsports instead); the team finished eleventh overall, and fourth in the LM P2 class. Ricardo González returned to the team for the 6 Hours of Bahrain, and the team finished twelfth overall, seventh in the LMP2 category. The 6 Hours of Fuji was the team's next race, and they finished 14th overall, and seventh in class. Greaves Motorsport then entered the final race of the ELMS season, which was the Petit Le Mans (also part of the ALMS); Alex Brundle, Kimber-Smith and Alex Buncombe were selected to drive, and they finished 32nd overall, fifth in the P2 class. The team finished the 2012 season by competing in the 6 Hours of Shanghai, which was part of the WEC; they finished 15th overall, and eighth in class. In the WEC, Greaves Motorsport were classified fifth in the LM P2 trophy, with 99 points; whilst in the ELMS, they were classified third in the LM P2 standings, with 48 points.

In 2013, Greaves Motorsport once again entered both the ELMS and the WEC. Chris Dyson and Michael Marsal were hired for the first round of the ELMS, whilst Dyson and Marsal were joined by Kimber-Smith for the WEC. The team started the 2013 season by entering the opening round of the ELMS, which was the 3 Hours of Silverstone on 13 April; the team retired after 23 laps. They then entered the 6 Hours of Silverstone, which was part of the WEC and held the following day; this time, the team finished eleventh overall, and fifth in class. The next event the team entered was the 6 Hours of Spa-Francorchamps, which was part of the WEC; however, the team withdrew from the event after Dyson crashed heavily in qualifying, leaving the car too damaged to race. The team then returned to the ELMS, and entered the 3 Hours of Imola; Kimber-Smith and David Heinemeier Hansson were selected to drive, and they finished fifth overall, and in class. For the 24 Hours of Le Mans, Greaves Motorsport once again entered two cars; Kimber-Smith, Alexander Rossi and Eric Lux in the No. 41 car, whilst Ordóñez, Michael Krumm and Jann Mardenborough drove the No. 42 car. As Greaves Motorsport had signed a deal with Caterham, the No. 41 car was entered under the Caterham Motorsport banner. In the race, the No. 42 car proved to be the quicker of the two; Krumm, Mardenborough and Ordóñez finished ninth overall, and third in the LM P2 class, whilst the Caterham Motorsport car finished 23rd overall, and tenth in the LM P2 class.

Although the team initially entered the Caterham-backed car in the 3 Hours of Red Bull Ring, part of the ELMS, they were forced to withdraw after they were unable to find any drivers to run; this was the first time the team had withdrawn from an ELMS event since their first race in the series, back in 2006. Zugel and Jeannette were partnered by Björn Wirdheim for the 6 Hours of São Paulo, which was part of the WEC; although they were running third at one point of the race, they eventually finished seventh overall, and fourth in the LM P2 category. The team then attempted to return to the ELMS, by entering the 3 Hours of Hungaroring, but did not register any drivers or attend the event. Zugel, Dyson and Kimber-Smith drove in the 6 Hours of Circuit of the Americas, part of the WEC, and took fifth in the LM P2 category, and ninth overall. For the 6 Hours of Fuji, Greaves Motorsport announced a partnership with local Super GT team Gainer, which resulted in Gainer's Katsuyuki Hiranaka partnering Björn Wirdheim and Masayuki Ueda; the combined effort was entered under the "Gainer International" banner. The race was halted at around the three-hour mark due to torrential rain, and the team were classified sixth overall, and third in class. The 6 Hours of Shanghai saw Greaves Motorsport hand Mark Shulzhitskiy his WEC debut, driving alongside Lux and Wirdheim; the trio took another fifth place in class for the team, and ninth overall. The final round of the WEC season, which was the 6 Hours of Bahrain, saw Wolfgang Reip make his debut in the series with Greaves Motorsport; he was partnered by fellow debutant Jon Lancaster and Wildheim. Despite the team's inexperience, they were able to finish third in the LM P2 class, and fifth overall. The team finished the year classified fifth in the LM P2 category of the WEC, with 81 points, and ninth in the ELMS, with ten points.

=== 2014–2015 ===
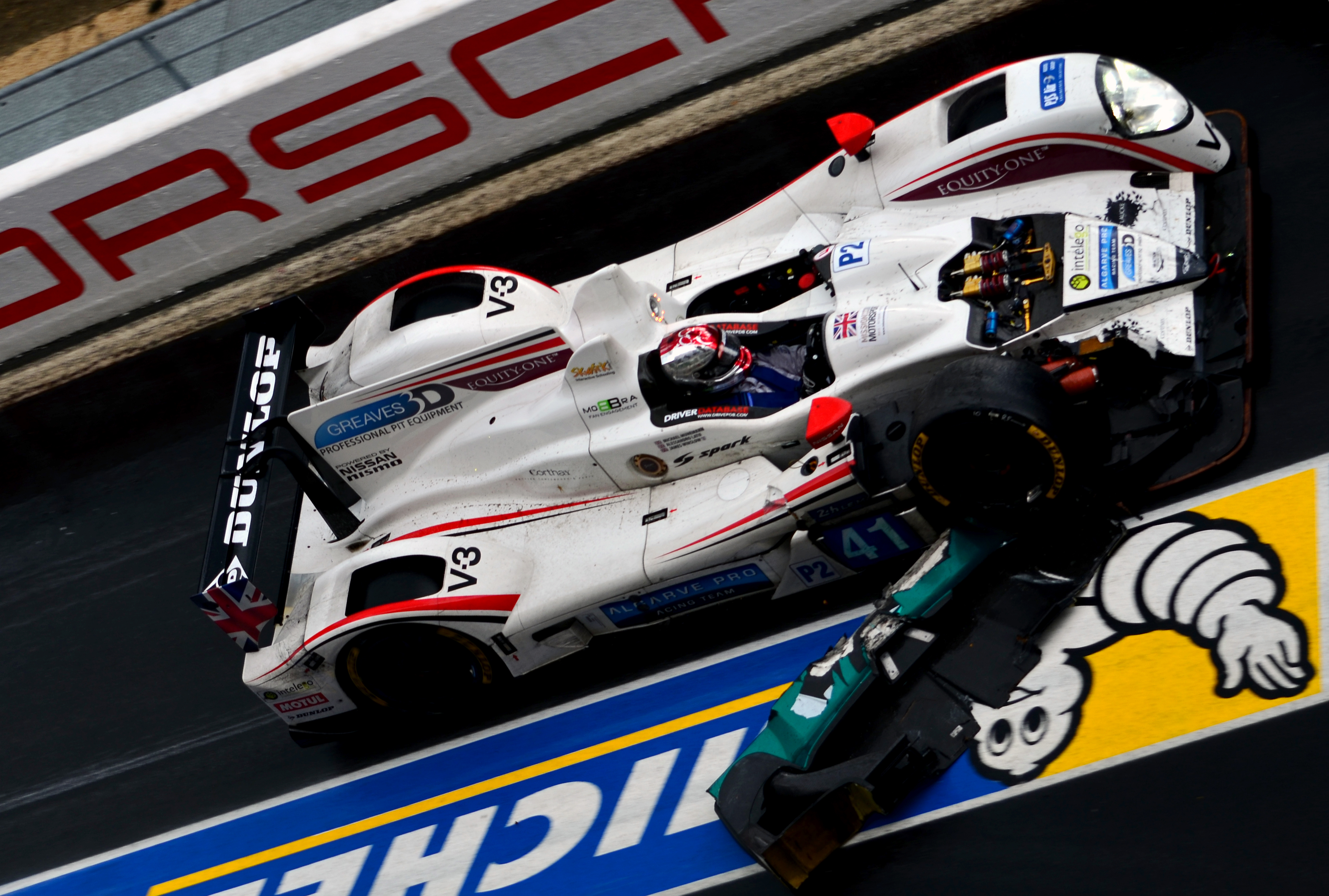
After colliding in the rain, Michael Munemann brings the damaged Greaves-Zytek down pit lane dragging a portion of the Murphy Prototypes bodywork beneath him.

In 2014, Greaves Motorsport returned to the ELMS, once again campaigning two Zytek Z11SNs. After the team's failure to secure a guaranteed spot at the 2014 24 Hours of Le Mans, Caterham withdrew their backing of Greaves Motorsport. At the 4 Hours of Silverstone, the team fielded three ELMS and LM P2 category débutantes; Matt McMurry, James Littlejohn, and Tony Wells. It was to be a successful début for all three drivers; McMurry, partnered by Dyson and Kimber-Smith, finished fourth, whilst Littlejohn and Wells were partnered by James Walker and finished sixth. Littlejohn had actually lead the race at one point, and both he and McMurry were nominated for "Driver of the Day" by Radio Le Mans. For the 4 Hours of Imola, Greaves entered one car, driven by Kimber-Smith and McMurry; for the second race in succession, they finished fourth. Greaves Motorsport had two entries at the 24 Hours of Le Mans; the #41 car, which was driven by James Winslow, Alessandro Latif and Michael Munemann under their own name, and the #42 car, which was driven by McMurry (who became the youngest ever competitor at the event), Dyson and Kimber-Smith under the Caterham Racing banner. Although the #41 car was forced to retire due to suspension damage after Munemann crashed, the #42 car was able to finish tenth in class, and 25th overall. Greaves Motorsport then returned to the ELMS for the 4 Hours of Red Bull Ring, where Luciano Bacheta and Mark Shulzhitskiy drove one car, and Kimber-Smith, Mark Patterson and McMurry drove the other; the two entries finished fourth and sixth respectively. The next race, which was the 4 Hours of Castellet, proved to be a mixed bag; whilst Shulzhitskiy and Bacheta were able to challenge for the lead before eventually finishing fifth, the car of McMurry and Johnny Mowlem crashed out of the race at the first corner. At the final race of the season, which was the 4 Hours of Estoril, the team had another mixed race; Shulzhitskiy and Bacheta were running third before an incident whilst lapping GT cars led to their eventual retirement, whilst McMurry, Miguel Faisca and James Fletcher took seventh place. Greaves Motorsport finished the season fourth in the LM P2 Team's standings, tied with Morand Racing on 68 points.

On 16 December 2014, it was announced that Greaves Motorsport would be competing in the LM P2 class of both the ELMS and the FIA WEC for the 2015 season, subject to their application's approval, with Gibson Technology's updated version of the Zytek Z11SN, renamed as the Gibson 015S.

=== 2015–2016 ===
Greaves Motorsport achieved sixth place in the LM P2 class, and a top ten finish overall, in the team’s Nissan-powered Ligier JS P2 prototype during the 24 Hours of Le Mans in June 2016; three of their drivers completed 348 laps. The team also achieved a top-six finish with the Ligier JS P2 in the 4 Hours of Red Bull Ring in July, the third round of the 2016 European Le Mans Series. Greaves entered the WEC 6 Hours of Mexico as part of a tie-in with the race's promoters.

== Racing record ==
=== 24 Hours of Le Mans results ===
Year	Entrant	No.	Car	Drivers	Class	Laps	Pos.	Class Pos.
2007	(United Kingdom) Team Bruichladdich Radical	21	Radical SR9-AER	(United Kingdom) Tim Greaves (United Kingdom) Robin Liddell (United Kingdom) Stuart Moseley	LMP2	16	DNF	DNF
2008	(United Kingdom) Team Bruichladdich Radical	26	Radical SR9-AER	(United Kingdom) Ben Devlin (United States) Gunnar Jeannette (France) Marc Rostan	LMP2	297	31st	6th
2009	(United Kingdom) Bruichladdich-Bruneau Team	26	Radical SR9-AER	(France) Pierre Bruneau (United Kingdom) Tim Greaves (France) Marc Rostan	LMP2	91	DNF	DNF
2010	(United Kingdom) Team Bruichladdich	41	Ginetta-Zytek GZ09S/2	(France) Gary Chalandon (United Kingdom) Tim Greaves (Saudi Arabia) Karim Ojjeh	LMP2	341	10th	5th
2011	(United Kingdom) Greaves Motorsport	41	Zytek Z11SN-Nissan	(United Kingdom) Tom Kimber-Smith (France) Olivier Lombard (Saudi Arabia) Karim Ojjeh	LMP2	326	8th	1st
2012	(United Kingdom) Greaves Motorsport	41	Zytek Z11SN-Nissan	(Mexico) Ricardo González (Ecuador) Elton Julian (Germany) Christian Zugel	LMP2	348	12th	5th
2012	(United Kingdom) Greaves Motorsport	42	Zytek Z11SN-Nissan	(United Kingdom) Alex Brundle (United Kingdom) Martin Brundle (Spain) Lucas Ordóñez	LMP2	340	15th	8th
2013	(United Kingdom) Greaves Motorsport	41	Zytek Z11SN-Nissan	(United Kingdom) Tom Kimber-Smith (United States) Eric Lux (United States) Alexander Rossi	LMP2	307	23rd	10th
2013	(United Kingdom) Greaves Motorsport	42	Zytek Z11SN-Nissan	(Germany) Michael Krumm (United Kingdom) Jann Mardenborough (Spain) Lucas Ordóñez	LMP2	327	9th	3rd
2014	(United Kingdom) Greaves Motorsport	41	Zytek Z11SN-Nissan	(United Kingdom) Alessandro Latif (United Kingdom) Michael Munemann (United Kingdom) James Winslow	LMP2	31	DNF	DNF
2014	(Malaysia) Caterham Racing	42	Zytek Z11SN-Nissan	(United States) Chris Dyson (United Kingdom) Tom Kimber-Smith (United States) Matt McMurry	LMP2	329	25th	11th
2015	(United Kingdom) Greaves Motorsport	41	Gibson 015S-Nissan	(Switzerland) Gary Hirsch (United Kingdom) Jon Lancaster (France) Gaëtan Paletou	LMP2	71	DNF	DNF
2016	(United States) Krohn Racing	40	Ligier JS P2-Nissan	(Portugal) João Barbosa (Sweden) Niclas Jönsson (United States) Tracy Krohn	LMP2	338	22nd	13th
2016	(United Kingdom) Greaves Motorsport	41	Ligier JS P2-Nissan	(France) Nathanaël Berthon (France) Julien Canal (Mexico) Memo Rojas	LMP2	348	10th	6th
