= 2010 24 Hours of Le Mans =

78th 24 Hours of Le Mans endurance race

Previous: 2009	Next: 2011
Index: Races | Winners

The track layout of the Circuit de la Sarthe

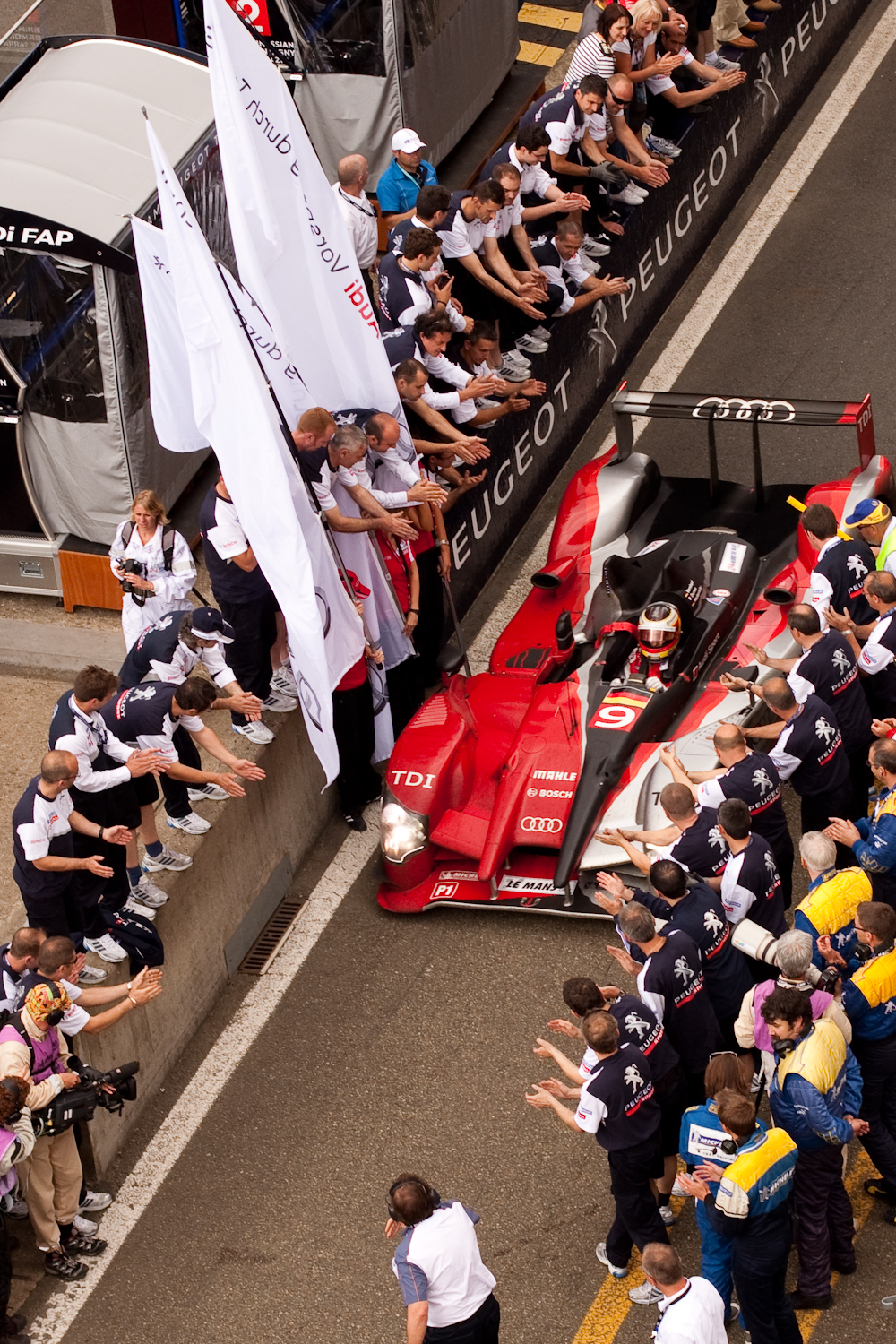
The race-winning No. 9 Audi R15 TDI plus of Timo Bernhard, Romain Dumas and Mike Rockenfeller, which set a race record for overall distance covered

The 78th 24 Hours of Le Mans (French: 78^{e} 24 Heures du Mans) was a non-championship 24-hour automobile endurance race for teams of three drivers each fielding Le Mans Prototype (LMP) and Grand Touring (GT) cars held from 12 to 13 June 2010 at the Circuit de la Sarthe, near Le Mans, France, before 238,150 spectators. It was the 78th 24 Hours of Le Mans as organised by the Automobile Club de l'Ouest (ACO).

A Peugeot 908 HDi FAP shared by Sébastien Bourdais, Pedro Lamy and Simon Pagenaud started from pole position after Bourdais set the fastest overall qualifying lap in the first qualifying session. The team led for the opening two hours before retiring with a suspension mounting fault in the third hour, giving the lead to the sister Peugeot squad of Anthony Davidson, Marc Gené and Alexander Wurz until they had to enter the garage to replace a failed alternator. Peugeot's third trio of Nicolas Minassian, Franck Montagny and Stéphane Sarrazin led the following 144 laps before the engine failed due to connecting rod failure. This gave the lead to an Audi R15 TDI plus driven by Audi Sport North America's Timo Bernhard, Romain Dumas and Mike Rockenfeller and they held it to the finish. It was Bernhard, Dumas and Rockenfeller's maiden Le Mans victory and Audi's ninth overall since 2000. The Audi Sport Team Joest trio of Marcel Fässler, André Lotterer and Benoît Tréluyer finished one lap behind in second, and their teammates Rinaldo Capello, Tom Kristensen and Allan McNish completed an Audi sweep of the overall podium another two laps behind in third.

Strakka Racing's HPD ARX-01C car, driven by Jonny Kane, Nick Leventis and Danny Watts, won the Le Mans Prototype 2 (LMP2) category after leading the final 267 laps. They were six laps ahead of the second-placed OAK Racing trio of Jan Charouz, Matthieu Lahaye and Guillaume Moreau in a Pescarolo 01-Judd. Roland Bervillé, Julien Canal and Gabriele Gardel won the Le Mans Grand Touring 1 (LMGT1) class in a Saleen S7-R, securing Larbre Compétition its fifth Le Mans category victory. The class order and podium was completed by David Hart, Stéphan Grégoire, Jérôme Policand sharing Luc Alphand Aventures' Chevrolet Corvette C6.R and the Young Driver AMR's Tomáš Enge, Peter Kox and Christoffer Nygaard in an Aston Martin DBR9. A Team Felbermayr-Proton Porsche 997 GT3-RSR won the Le Mans Grand Touring 2 (LMGT2) category with drivers Wolf Henzler, Marc Lieb and Richard Lietz. Team Farnbacher's Ferrari F430 GT2 shared by Dominik Farnbacher, Leh Keen and Allan Simonsen were two laps adrift in second and the class podium was completed by BMS Scuderia Italia's trio of Marco Holzer, Timo Scheider and Richard Westbrook in a Porsche 997 GT3-RSR.

== Background and regulation changes ==
The 2010 24 Hours of Le Mans, the 78th edition of the event, took place on the 13.629 km (8.469 mi) Circuit de la Sarthe road circuit, near Le Mans, France, from 12 to 13 June. The race began in 1923 when automotive journalist Charles Faroux, Automobile Club de l'Ouest (ACO) general secretary Georges Durand and industrialist Emile Coquile agreed to hold a test of vehicle reliability and durability. The 24 Hours of Le Mans is considered the world's most prestigious sports car race and is part of the Triple Crown of Motorsport.

In 2009, the ACO approved a series of rule changes for the race. It accepted cars eligible for the FIA GT1 World Championship if they were entered in any one of the ACO-administered championships in the American Le Mans Series (ALMS), Le Mans Series (LMS) or Asian Le Mans Series (ASLMS). In the event of an accident, there would now be three safety cars deployed rather than two as observed in LMS rounds, and illuminated number panels were mandated for night conditions. Pit stops were lengthened due to new tyre switching regulations designed to prevent open-cockpit vehicles from gaining an advantage.

In August 2009, the ACO issued a revised set of technical regulations aimed at achieving parity between diesel and gasoline-powered vehicles. Diesel restrictors, restrictor advantages, and petrol restrictors were reduced in size, while petrol restrictors and Aston Martin Le Mans Grand Touring 1 (LMGT1) engine restrictors were increased in Le Mans Prototype 1 (LMP1) cars. In comparison to petrol-powered cars, LMP1 diesel engine vehicles' minimum weight ballast was increased by 30 kg (66 lb) to 930 kg (2,050 lb). No other class's minimum weights were changed.

== Entries ==
The ACO Selection Committee received 84 entry requests between the opening on 21 December 2009 and the deadline on 20 January 2010, with priority given to manufacturer and full-time teams in one or more Le Mans-based championships such as the 2009 LMS, the 2009 ALMS and the 2009 ASLMS. It initially planned to grant 55 entries divided between the LMP1, Le Mans Prototype 2 (LMP2), LMGT1 and Le Mans Grand Touring 2 (LMGT2) categories, but the ACO thought of increasing the pit lane capacity to 56 cars with the intention of enabling teams to enter "a specific and innovative project" in future years and thus took steps to ensure the additional pit was operational on 4 June.

=== Automatic entries ===
Teams that won their class in the 2009 24 Hours of Le Mans as well as those that won championships in other Le Mans-based series and events such as the LMS, the ALMS, the ASLMS, the FIA GT Championship and the Petit Le Mans received automatic entries. Some championship runners-up in certain series were also given automatic invitations. An entry was also granted to the LMS Green X Challenge, which was a season-long award based on car fuel economy during each LMS event. Because entries were pre-selected to teams, they were limited to a maximum of two cars and were not permitted to change their vehicles or category from one year to the next or their automatic invitation would be revoked. The ACO required automatic entries to confirm that berths had been taken up prior to January 2010.

On November 19, 2009, the ACO released its final list of automatic entries, which included 29 teams. Automatic entries were rejected by Corvette Racing, Lowe's Fernández Racing, Patrón Highcroft Racing and Speedy Racing Team Sebah and Vitaphone Racing Team.

Automatic entries for the 2010 24 Hours of Le Mans
Reason entered	LMP1	LMP2	LMGT1	LMGT2
1st in the 24 Hours of Le Mans	(France) Peugeot Sport Total	(Denmark) Team Essex (Note: Team declined their automatic invitation.)	(United States) Corvette Racing	(United States) Risi Competizione
2nd in the 24 Hours of Le Mans	(France) Team Peugeot Total	(Switzerland) Speedy Racing Team Sebah	(France) Luc Alphand Aventures	(Italy) BMS Scuderia Italia
1st in the Le Mans Series	(United Kingdom) Aston Martin Racing	(Portugal) Quifel ASM Team	(France) Luc Alphand Aventures	(Germany) Team Felbermayr-Proton
2nd in the Le Mans Series	(France) Pescarolo Sport (Note: Team accepted their invitation but later withdrew their entry.)	(Switzerland) Speedy Racing Team Sebah	N/A (Note: Larbre Compétition finished second in the 2009 LMS but did not gain an automatic invitation to the LMGT1 category because the team did not enter every race of the season.)	(United Kingdom) JMW Motorsport
1st in the Petit Le Mans	(France) Peugeot Sport Total	N/A (Note: Dyson Racing achieved victory in the LMP2 category in the 2009 Petit Le Mans but did not receive an automatic invitation due to the rear wing on their car not complying with 2009 ACO regulations.)		(United States) Risi Competizione
1st in the American Le Mans Series	(United States) Patrón Highcroft Racing	(Mexico) Lowe's Fernández Racing		(United States) Flying Lizard Motorsports
1st in the Asian Le Mans Series	(France) Sora Racing	(France) OAK Racing	(Japan) JLOC	(Germany) Hankook Team Farnbacher
1st in the FIA GT Championship			(Germany) Vitaphone Racing Team	(Italy) AF Corse
2nd in the FIA GT Championship			(Belgium) Peka Racing	(Belgium) Prospeed Competition
1st in the LMS Green X Challenge		(Switzerland) Speedy Racing Team Sebah		

=== Entry list and reserves ===
During its yearly press conference, which was broadcast live on the internet on the afternoon of February 4, 2010, the ACO announced the full 55-car list for Le Mans, plus ten reserves. Except in cases of force majeure, the ACO required each entry to confirm a nominated unreplaceable driver. Any withdrawn team after the 1 February 2010 would be replaced by a reserve entry by category, with a GT car replacing another GT vehicle, and the same procedure would be followed for LMP entries. The other two drivers' names were optional but recommended until May 12, 2010, following the 2010 1000 km of Spa.

Dome withdrew its Dome-Judd S102 LMP1 coupe on April 5, 2010, after its partnership with French partner OAK Racing ended, possibly due to budget constraints. The first withdrawal allowed the LMP2 Pegasus Racing Norma MP200P-Judd car to compete. Yoshimisa Hayashi asked the ACO two days later to remove the Tokai University Courage-YGK vehicle from the reserve list so that the university could focus on the following year and build a hybrid powertrain. Modena Racing Group (MRG) did not confirm to the ACO their race entry with a Ferrari F430 GT2 before the entry deadline in May. Team Felbermayr-Proton thus had a second Porsche 911 GT3 RSR promoted to the race in lieu of MRG.

That same month, PK Carsport withdrew its Chevrolet Corvette C6.R due to the car catching fire at the FIA GT1 World Championship meeting at Silverstone Circuit, stopping the team from having adequate preparation and resources for Le Mans. AF Corse had a second Ferrari F430 GT2 added to the event due to PK's withdrawal. The financially struggling Pescarolo Sport and Sora Racing withdrew their Pescarolo-Judd entries and the KSM Lola B07/40-Judd car and Matech Competition's second Ford GT1 following failed negotiations for the investment firm Genii Capital to purchase Pescarolo, marking Pescarolo's first Le Mans non-entry since 2000. In June, the ACO announced that the first reserve Race Performance Radical SR9-Judd car would receive the 56th entry to retain a LMP and GT entry balance.

== Practice ==
All teams had a single four-hour free practice session on June 9. Peugeot led from the start, with Franck Montagny's No. 2 Peugeot 908 HDi FAP lapping fastest at 3:20.034. His teammate Sébastien Bourdais' No. 3 Peugeot was second-quickest, with Loïc Duval's No. 4 Team Oreca Matmut Peugeot third. Marc Gené was the slowest Peugeot factory driver in fourth in the No. 1 car, and the fastest Audi was Allan McNish's No. 7 Audi R15 TDI plus in fifth. Aston Martin Racing's No. 009 Lola-Aston Martin B09/60 of Darren Turner was the fastest petrol-powered LMP1 car in eighth. Despite a fuel system issue, David Brabham's No. 26 Highcroft Racing HPD ARX-01C car lapped fastest in LMP2 at 3:38.691. Jonny Kane's No. 42 Strakka Racing-entered HPD ARX.01 and Thomas Erdos' No. 25 RML Lola B08/80-HPD cars were second and third in class. Young Driver AMR's No. 52 Aston Martin DBR9 of Tomáš Enge led in LMGT1 from Stéphan Grégoire's No. 72 Luc Alphand Aventures (LAA) Corvette. Olivier Beretta's No. 64 Corvette led LMGT2 and was third amongst all LMGT entries, ahead of Marc Lieb's second-placed Team Felbermayr-Proton No. 77 Porsche 997 GT3 RSR. Romain Grosjean damaged the rear of the Matech Competition's No. 60 Ford GT against the Armco and tyre barrier entering the Porsche Curves, stopping the session for half an hour. His teammate Rahel Frey lost control of the sister No. 61 Ford in the same sequence of corners, removing the rear wing against the wall. Both vehicles were repaired in time for the first qualifying session.

== Qualifying ==
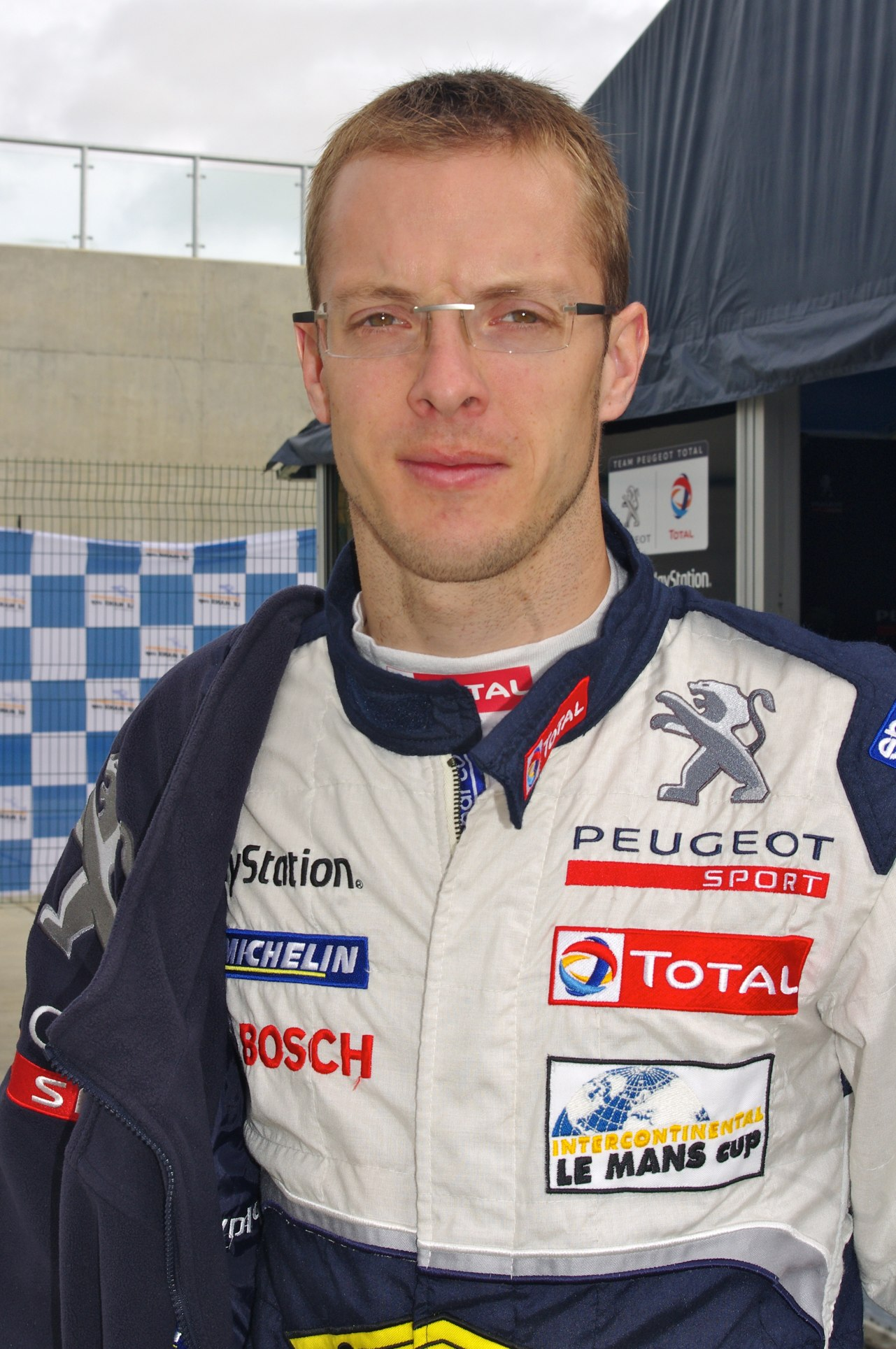
Sébastien Bourdais set the fastest overall lap in the first qualifying session to put the No. 3 Peugeot on overall pole position.

The first of three two-hour qualifying sessions to set the race's starting order with the quickest lap times set by each team's fastest driver began late on the night of 9 June, in dry and cool conditions. Nicolas Lapierre set the early pace in the No. 4 Oreca Peugeot with a 3:21.192 lap until a fuel pick-up issue forced him to stop at Arnage corner, effectively ending his crew's running. In the final half-hour, Bourdais improved Lapierre's lap time to 3:19.711, giving the No. 3 Peugeot provisional pole position. The sister Nos. 1 and 3 Peugeots of Alexander Wurz and Stéphane Sarrazin were second and third, with Lapierre's No. 4 Oreca car fourth. Mike Rockenfeller and Benoît Tréluyer's No. 9 and 8 Audis were fifth and sixth. Kane's lap of 3:36.168 put the Strakka HPD ARX-01 car on provisional pole in LMP2, ahead of Brabham's Highcroft entry and Olivier Pla's Quifel ASM Team Ginetta-Zytek GZ09S/2 car. An early lap by Enge in the Young Driver AMR Aston Martin was enough to lead the LMGT1 category. Enge's lap was two seconds faster than Thomas Mutsch in Matech's second-placed No. 60 Ford followed by LAA's Corvettes of Julien Jousse and Jérôme Policand in third and fourth. Gianmaria Bruni put the No. 82 Risi Competizione Ferrari on provisional pole in LMGT2 despite a broken gearbox output shaft requiring the attention of mechanics in the garage for most of the session. Jan Magnussen and Emmanuel Collard's Nos. 63 and 64 Corvettes were second and third in class. Separate accidents for the No. 88 Team Felbermayr-Proton Porsche's front-right blocking the circuit and Matías Russo with the No. 96 AF Corse Ferrari exiting the Porsche Curves disrupted the session.

Russo was taken to the medical centre after the session and found to be unharmed. Due to heavy damage to the car and a lack of spare parts, AF Corse withdrew the No. 96 Ferrari from the race. Following an earlier downpour, the circuit was damp for the second session on June 10, but it quickly dried as qualifying progressed. Wurz led the session with a 3:23.238 lap, but the No. 1 Peugeot remained second overall after Wurz was unable to lap faster amongst slower cars. The sister Peugeots of Sarrazin and Simon Pagenaud were second and third. Brabham gave the debuting Highcroft HPD ARX-01C entry provisional pole position in LMP2 with an improved lap of 3:34.537, overtaking Strakka's car by 1.6 seconds. The Quifel ASM Team Ginetta remained third in category. In LMGT1, Bas Leinders moved the No. 70 Marc VDS Racing Team Ford GT past the No. 60 Matech car to second in class behind Enge's category-leading Young Driver AMR Aston Martin. Similarly, AF Corse SRL's No. 95 Ferrari of Toni Vilander took second in LMGT2 with a lap almost three seconds faster and gained four positions in class. Despite crashes for Manuel Rodrigues' No. 13 Kolles Audi in the Porsche Curves, the No. 13 Rebellion Racing Lola B10/60 of Jean-Christophe Boullion at Karting corner, Mike Newton's No. 25 RML entry at Tertre Rouge turn and a collision between Jacques Nicolet and Stephane Salini on the inside at the Ford chicane, the session was not halted.

The weather remained dry for the final session that night. Only a few cars improved their lap times, and Bourdais's pole position time from the first session was not improved upon. Peugeot achieved their fourth successive pole position at Le Mans. Bourdais's No. 3 Peugeot led the session with the day's quickest lap, 3:20.212. Audi improved all three of their cars during the session to be 2.2 seconds behind the four Peugeots. Rockenfeller's No. 9 Audi qualified fifth, with McNish's No. 7 car sixth and Marcel Fässler's No. 8 entry seventh. In LMP2, HPD-powered cars took the first three places. Watts set a 3:33.079 lap in Strakka's car in the final hour for the category pole. Due to traffic, Brabham was unable to better Highcroft's lap and finished second. Enge's first session lap in the Young Driver AMR Aston Martin was unopposed in LMGT1, giving him his sixth category pole position in eight years. The Marc VDS Ford was second after Leinders' second session lap, and Grosjean improved the No. 60 Matech Ford's best lap to third. Bruni's No. 82 Risi Ferrari retained the LMGT2 lead despite setting no laps during the session due to its race-specific gearbox and engine. The two Corvettes of Oliver Gavin and Antonio García overtook the No. 95 AF Corse SRL Ferrari for second and third in category. There were fewer incidents during the session as teams concentrated on the race.

=== Post-qualifying ===
After the third qualifying session, the No. 82 Risi Ferrari was subjected to an ACO scrutineering inspection. Scrutineers failed the car's inspection because the gurney flap on the rear wing was 2 mm (0.079 in) too low, demoting the vehicle to the back of the LMGT2 starting order. The No. 64 Corvette was promoted to pole position in LMGT2, with the sister No. 63 car second in class. The No. 13 Rebellion Lola car's tub was sent to a nearby carbon fibre workshop because a small hole needed repairing.

=== Qualifying results ===
Pole position winners in each class are indicated in bold. The fastest time set by each entry is denoted in gray.

Final qualifying classification
Pos	No.	Team	Car	Class	Day 1	Day 2	Gap	Grid
1	**3**	**Peugeot Sport Total**	**Peugeot 908 HDi FAP**	**LMP1**	**3:19.711**	**3:20.212**		**1**
2	1	Team Peugeot Total	Peugeot 908 HDi FAP	LMP1	3:20.317	3:22.007	+0.606	2
3	2	Team Peugeot Total	Peugeot 908 HDi FAP	LMP1	3:20.325	3:20.961	+0.614	3
4	4	Team Oreca Matmut	Peugeot 908 HDi FAP	LMP1	3:21.192	3:23.141	+1.481	4
5	9	Audi Sport North America	Audi R15 TDI plus	LMP1	3:23.578	3:21.981	+2.270	5
6	7	Audi Sport Team Joest	Audi R15 TDI plus	LMP1	3:24.688	3:22.176	+2.465	6
7	8	Audi Sport Team Joest	Audi R15 TDI plus	LMP1	3:24.430	3:23.605	+3.894	7
8	007	Aston Martin Racing	Lola-Aston Martin B09/60	LMP1	3:26.680	3:29.369	+6.969	8
9	009	Aston Martin Racing	Lola-Aston Martin B09/60	LMP1	3:26.747	3:28.869	+7.036	9
10	6	AIM Team Oreca Matmut	Oreca 01-AIM	LMP1	3:30.056	3:29.506	+9.795	10
11	008	Signature-Plus	Lola-Aston Martin B09/60	LMP1	3:29.774	3:37.142	+10.063	11
12	14	Kolles	Audi R10 TDI	LMP1	3:30.907	3:31.870	+11.196	12
13	15	Kolles	Audi R10 TDI	LMP1	3:31.661	3:34.401	+11.950	13
14	11	Drayson Racing	Lola B09/60	LMP1	3:36.634	3:31.862	+12.151	14
15	**42**	**Strakka Racing**	**HPD ARX-01C**	**LMP2**	**3:36.168**	**3:33.079**	**+13.368**	**15**
16	12	Rebellion Racing	Lola B10/60-Rebellion	LMP1	No Time	3:33.490	+13.779	16
17	26	Highcroft Racing	HPD ARX-01C	LMP2	3:37.202	3:34.537	+14.826	17
18	5	Beechdean Mansell	Ginetta-Zytek GZ09S	LMP1	3:36.897	3:38.367	+17.186	18
19	13	Rebellion Racing	Lola B10/60-Rebellion	LMP1	3:44.101	3:37.093	+17.382	19
20	25	RML	Lola B08/80-HPD	LMP2	3:44.598	3:39.648	+19.937	20
21	40	Quifel ASM Team	Ginetta-Zytek GZ09S/2	LMP2	3:41.968	3:40.532	+20.821	21
22	35	OAK Racing	Pescarolo 01-Judd	LMP2	3:42.399	3:41.310	+21.599	22
23	19	Michael Lewis/Autocon	Lola B06/10-AER	LMP1	4:00.646	3:43.167	+23.456	23
24	29	Racing Box SRL	Lola B08/80-Judd	LMP2	3:51.065	3:47.971	+28.260	24
25	41	Team Bruichladdich	Ginetta-Zytek GZ09S/2	LMP2	3:55.680	3:51.189	+31.478	25
26	39	KSM	Lola B07/40	LMP2	3:52.972	3:51.310	+31.599	26
27	24	OAK Racing	Pescarolo 01-Judd	LMP2	3:52.730	3:52.008	+32.297	27
28	38	Pegasus Racing	Norma M200P	LMP2	4:03.784	3:52.837	+33.126	28
29	37	Gerard Welter	WR LMP2008	LMP2	3:55.818	3:53.109	+33.398	29
30	28	Race Performance AG	Radical SR9	LMP2	3:59.361	3:53.942	+34.231	30
31	**52**	**Young Driver AMR**	**Aston Martin DBR9**	**LMGT1**	**3:55.025**	**4:02.133**	**+35.314**	**31**
32	70	Marc VDS Racing Team	Ford GT1	LMGT1	4:00.325	3:55.356	+35.645	32
33	60	Matech Competition	Ford GT1	LMGT1	3:57.296	3:55.583	+35.872	33
34	73	Luc Alphand Aventures	Chevrolet Corvette C6.R	LMGT1	3:58.810	4:14.438	+39.099	34
35	72	Luc Alphand Aventures	Chevrolet Corvette C6.R	LMGT1	3:58.906	4:03.423	+39.195	35
36	82	Risi Competizione	Ferrari F430 GT2	LMGT2	3:59.233	4:03.104	+39.522	55 (Note: The No. 82 Risi Competizione Ferrari had its qualifying times deleted for an infringement discovered in post-qualifying technical inspection.)
37	**64**	**Corvette Racing**	**Chevrolet Corvette C6.R**	**LMGT2**	**4:01.012**	**3:59.435**	**+39.724**	**36**
38	63	Corvette Racing	Chevrolet Corvette C6.R	LMGT2	4:00.097	3:59.793	+40.082	37
39	95	AF Corse SRL	Ferrari F430 GT2	LMGT2	4:02.492	3:59.837	+40.126	38
40	61	Matech Competition	Ford GT1	LMGT1	4:11.566	4:01.628	+41.917	39
41	77	Team Felbermayr-Proton	Porsche 997 GT3-RSR	LMGT2	4:02.001	4:01.640	+41.929	40
42	76	IMSA Performance Matmut	Porsche 997 GT3-RSR	LMGT2	4:01.755	4:06.630	+42.044	41
43	78	BMW Motorsport	BMW M3 GT2	LMGT2	4:04.986	4:01.893	+42.182	42
44	97	BMS Scuderia Italia SpA	Porsche 997 GT3-RSR	LMGT2	4:06.278	4:02.014	+42.303	43
45	89	Hankook Team Farnbacher	Ferrari F430 GT2	LMGT2	4:03.886	4:02.427	+42.716	44
46	96	AF Corse SRL	Ferrari F430 GT2	LMGT2	4:02.615	No Time	+42.904	WD
47	80	Flying Lizard Motorsports	Porsche 997 GT3-RSR	LMGT2	4:08.315	4:02.685	+42.974	45
48	50	Larbre Compétition	Saleen S7-R	LMGT1	4:03.175	4:06.091	+43.464	46
49	79	BMW Motorsport	BMW M3 GT2	LMGT2	4:05.851	4:03.215	+43.504	47
50	83	Risi Competizione	Ferrari F430 GT2	LMGT2	4:03.959	4:13.047	+44.248	48
51	85	Spyker Squadron	Spyker C8 Laviolette GT2-R-Audi	LMGT2	4:06.997	4:04.057	+44.346	49
52	92	JMW Motorsport	Aston Martin V8 Vantage GT2	LMGT2	4:06.391	4:04.303	+44.592	50
53	69	JLOC	Lamborghini Murciélago LP 670 R-SV	LMGT1	4:13.368	4:05.170	+45.459	51
54	75	Prospeed Competition	Porsche 997 GT3-RSR	LMGT2	4:14.578	4:10.017	+50.306	52
55	88	Team Felbermayr-Proton	Porsche 997 GT3-RSR	LMGT2	4:10.054	4:20.293	+50.343	53
56	81	Jaguar RSR	Jaguar XKR GT2	LMGT2	4:13.537	4:12.431	+52.720	54

== Warm-up ==
There was a 45-minute warm-up session held on the morning of 12 June. Due to a wet track caused by overnight rain, cars were driven on intermediate rain tyres, and several drivers were caught out by the damp surface. Audi and Peugeot traded fastest laps until McNish's No. 7 Audi lapped quickest overall at 3:51.401. In second place was Gené's No. 1 Peugeot, and his teammate Montagny's No. 3 entry was third. The quickest LMP2 time was 4:08.262 set by Marco Werner in Highcroft's entry over Erdos' second-placed RML car. Leinders' Marc VDS Ford GT was fastest in LMGT1, while Jean Alesi 's No. 95 AF Corse SRL Ferrari led in LMGT2. Tim Greaves damaged the No. 41 Team Bruichladdich Ginetta-Zytek vehicle's front-left, and the No. 73 LAA Corvette had a left-rear puncture.

== Race ==
=== Start and first hours ===
At 15:00 local time on 12 June, in front of 238,150 spectators, Rolex CEO Bruno Meier and triple Olympic skiing champion Jean-Claude Killy waved the French tricolour to start the race. The ambient temperature for both days was predicted to be around 20 and 23 °C (68 and 73 °F). During a reconnaissance lap, Neel Jani's No. 80 Flying Lizard Motorsports Porsche sustained a left-rear puncture after going over a screw, overshooting the Dunlop Chicane, and mounting the kerbs; the car's bodywork was undamaged. Lamy in the pole-position No. 3 Peugeot kept the lead for the first few laps, with factory teammates Montagny and Gené trading second and third on the third lap. Lapierre's No. 4 Oreca Peugeot kept McNish's No. 7 Audi from passing him for fourth. Mike Lewis retired the No. 19 Autocon Motorsports Lola after Arnage turn on lap one due to gearbox input shaft failure. Julien Jousse's No. 73 LAA Corvette overtook Mutsch's No. 60 Matech Ford for third in LMGT1 as the class became a battle between Leinders' No. 70 Marc VDS Ford and Peter Kox's No. 52 Young Driver AMR Aston Martin as Patrick Long progressed to third in LMGT2.

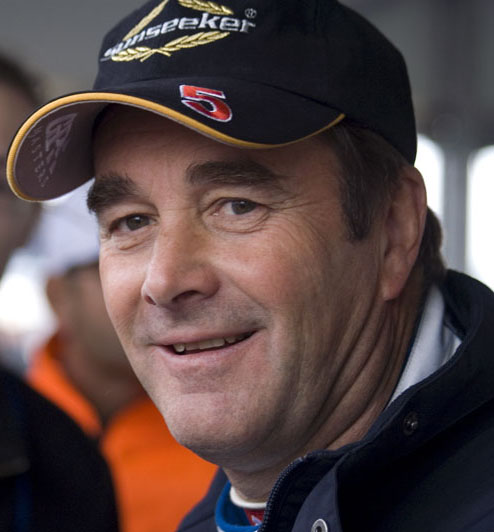
Nigel Mansell crashed the Beechdean Motorsport Ginetta Zytek in the race's first hour and had amnesia, haematoma on his brain and a neck injury as a result.

After five laps and 18 minutes had passed, Nigel Mansell crashed the No. 5 Beechdean Motorsport Ginetta Zytek at high speed into the barriers between Mulsanne and Indianapolis turns due to a slow left-rear puncture that the team failed to detect because that part of the circuit was not covered by telemetry. Safety cars were deployed for 31 minutes to allow track marshals to repair the Armco barriers. A motionless Mansell remained in the car until he was extricated and doctors transported him by ambulance to the track's medical centre for check-ups and then to the local hospital. The accident gave Mansell amnesia, haematoma on his brain and a neck injury. When the safety cars were withdrawn, Mutsch passed Kox for the LMGT1 lead after both drivers made pit stops under safety car conditions. The safety cars had divided the field at the front, leaving three factory Peugeots 57 seconds ahead of the three Audis. Kane's No. 42 Strakka and Brabham's No. 26 Highcroft entries battled for the LMP2 lead. Montagny had made a pit stop earlier than teammate Lamy but Montagny's stop was two seconds quicker than Lamy, moving the No. 2 Peugeot to first. Soheil Ayari attempted to lap Jean-François Yvon's No. 24 OAK Pescarolo at Mulsanne turn, but the two cars collided and Ayari's No. 6 Oreca spun.

Dirk Müller stopped the No. 79 BMW on the first Mulsanne Straight chicane before the second hour concluded to conduct an inspection after feeling a right-rear problem. Müller discovered a right-rear puncture and drove cautiously to the pit lane, where it was discovered that the BMW's underside was damaged by kerbstones when Müller stopped. Not long after Leinders lost control of the second-placed LMGT1 No. 70 Ford due to an underinflated left-rear tyre from running on the same tyre compounds since the start and struck the tyre wall in the downhill Esses with the car's right-rear. Leinders returned to the pit lane to retire the heavily damaged car. The third hour saw Lamy enter the garage to retire the race-leading No. 3 Peugeot because the lower front-right suspension mounting point to the chassis was pulled out of the tub from mounting the kerbs too hard. The retirement promoted Oreca's No. 4 Peugeot to third and Tom Kristensen's No. 7 Audi to fourth. Enge's No. 52 Young Driver AMR car had been lapping faster than Xavier Maassen's No. 73 LAA car and overtook the Corvette for second in LMGT1.

Beretta's No. 64 Corvette and Johnny O'Connell's sister No. 63 car battled for the LMGT2 lead, with Bruni's No. 82 Risi Ferrari closing in on Beretta and O'Connell. Over the next four hours, Bruni and Beretta traded the lead several times because of the Risi Ferrari's superior ability to conserve fuel over the Corvette. At the start of the fourth hour, Peter Dumbreck lost control of the No. 85 Spyker C8 at Indianapolis corner and was collected by Frederic da Rocha's No. 38 Pegasus Racing Norma after going off the track again in the Porsche Curves. Da Rocha's car was thrown into the outside barrier and sustained irreparable damage to its rear end and transmission, forcing it to retire to the garage. During a pit stop cycle, Anthony Davidson was faster than his Peugeot teammate Sarrazin in the No. 2 car and moved the No. 1 entry into the overall race lead. During a routine pit stop, Romain Dumas' No. 9 Audi hit a television camera operator working for Speed, removing the car's right-front side-view mirror and knocking the camera operator to the ground. The camera operator was stretchered out of the pit lane with a broken shoulder and a gashed leg.

=== Evening to dawn ===
Kristensen, driving the fourth-placed No. 7 Audi, was approaching a slow Andy Priaulx on the racing line because Priaulx's No. 79 BMW had a front-left puncture in the high-speed Porsche Curves. Kristensen spun backwards into the tyre wall after Priaulx steered left in the first right-hand corner to left him through. Kristensen was recovered from the gravel, but the pit stop to replace the damaged rear bodywork cost the No. 7 Audi three laps and fell to seventh. Before the sixth hour ended, Bryce Miller crashed the No. 92 JMW Motorsport Aston Martin at the Porsche Curves hard enough to force the car to retire, bringing out the safety cars for the second time to allow marshals to clean the track and extricate the stricken car. During this slow period, Manuel Rodrigues damaged the No. 14 Kolles Audi's front-left against the wall at the right-hand kink before Indianapolis turn and drove to the garage for repairs to the front bodywork. On cold tyres, Nick Leventis spun the No. 42 Strakka HPD into the inside Dunlop Chicane gravel trap but was recovered by a tractor, losing the LMP2 lead temporarily to Werner's No. 26 Highcroft car when Leventis made a pit stop for checks.

When racing resumed, Rockenfeller's No. 9 Audi ran wide leaving the Porsche Curves, and his teammate Tréluyer's sister No. 8 entry overtook him for third into the Ford Chicane. Tréluyer damaged the No. 8 Audi's nose on the kerbing almost immediately, and the resulting pit stop moved the No. 9 car back ahead. The No. 1 Peugeot maintained first until Gené relinquished the lead the car had held for 59 consecutive laps; the car was pushed into the garage with alternator failure, necessitating a new alternator and electronic control unit. The stop lost the No. 1 Peugeot twelve minutes, and it fell four laps down in seventh. Jaime Melo's No. 82 Risi Ferrari retired from the LMGT2 lead when the car was forced to the garage to unsuccessfully fix intermittent gear selection issues. This moved Gavin's No. 64 Corvette to the category lead, with teammate Magnussen in second place in the No. 63 car. Strakka's No. 42 car maintained its lead in LMP2, but Brabham in the Highcroft entry was closing the gap to Watts, while Gene in the No. 1 Peugeot was gaining on McNish's fifth-placed No. 7 Audi.

After colliding with the rear of Mutsch's No. 60 Matech Ford and pushing him wide to the inside under braking in the tenth hour, Yvon removed the No. 24 OAK Pescarolo's front-left corner in a collision with the barriers at the Ford Chicane. Because marshals were needed to remove debris from the circuit, the safety cars were dispatched for the third time for nine minutes. Yvon returned to the garage for repairs to the No. 24 car. Mutsch also entered the pit lane for repairs, ceding the LMGT1 class lead to Gabriele Gardel's No. 50 Larbre Compétition Saleen. When racing resumed, Davidson's No. 1 Peugeot collided with Alesi's slower No. 95 AF Corse Ferrari on the inside at the Dunlop Chicane and went into the gravel trap, but he recovered with marshal assistance after losing 90 seconds to Kristensen's No. 7 Audi and making a pit stop for new front bodywork. Due to a puncture on his No. 42 Highcroft car that sent him into the gravel, Marino Franchitti lost two and a half laps to Watts' No. 26 Strakka car but remained second in LMP2. Duval drove the second-placed No. 4 Oreca Peugeot into the garage for 15 minutes due to repairable right-hand side driveshaft failure and other technical issues, dropping the car to sixth overall.

Just before half distance, Sarrazin's No. 2 Peugeot led the race, followed by Dumas' No. 9 Audi and André Lotterer's sister No. 8 entry. Strakka's No. 42 car, driven by Leventis, maintained the LMP2 lead because his team outperformed Highcroft. Gardel's No. 50 Larbre Saleen led Jousse's No. 73 LAA Corvette by two laps in LMGT1, while Collard's No. 64 Corvette led his teammate García's No. 63 entry in LMGT2. Nicolas Minassian replaced Sarrazin in the race-leading No. 2 Peugeot, extending the car's lead to a single lap over Lotterer's second-placed No. 8 Audi after it suffered a right-rear puncture on the out-lap and a leaking airjack during a routine pit stop that lost him another 30 seconds. Rockenfeller, and later Timo Bernhard and teammate Lotterer, went faster around this point, while Minassian lapped faster to extend the No. 2 Peugeot's overall lead. The No. 60 Matech Ford GT, which was third in LMGT1, was retired after attempts to restart the engine with oil and water were unsuccessful. Enge's Young Driver car outpaced the No. 73 LAA Corvette for third in LMGT1. Werner's Highcroft LMP2 car lost more ground to Strakka's class-leading entry when it entered the pit lane to replace the rear wing section and another pit stop that was delayed by a faulty left-front wheel nut.

=== Morning to finish ===
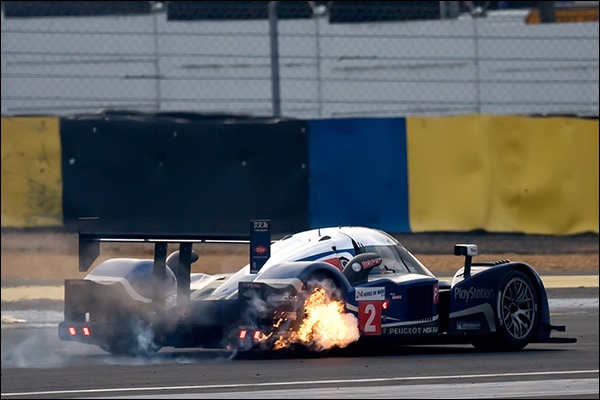
The No. 2 Peugeot being retired from the overall lead with connecting rod failure.

Erdos moved RML's No. 25 entry to third in LMP2 in the early morning; the No. 35 OAK Pescarolo was driven into the garage, and Olivier Pla's No. 40 Quifel-entered car went off the circuit at Arnage corner but recovered with marshal assistance. Some teams, including Beretta's No. 64 Corvette, swapped brake discs and callipers at this point in the race. Due to connecting rod failure, smoke and fire began billowing from the right-hand exhaust of Montagny's race-leading No. 2 Peugeot at Tertre Rouge corner. The Peugeot was abandoned on the Mulsanne Straight because Montagny could not return to the pit lane, ceding the overall lead the car had held for 144 successive laps to Bernhard's No. 9 Audi. García retired the No. 63 Corvette from second in LMGT2 into Indianapolis corner with a sudden engine crank sensor failure. Lieb's No. 77 Felbermayr-Proton Porsche moved to second, and Vilander's No. 95 AF Corse Ferrari was now third in class.

Jousse retired the No. 73 LAA Corvette, which was second in LMGT1, off the track as it approached the Indianapolis corner due to a sudden transmission component failure. This moved Christoffer Nygaard's No. 52 Young Driver AMR car and Policand's No. 72 LAA entry to second and third in class, respectively. Davidson's No. 1 Peugeot caught Collard's LMGT2 class-leading No. 64 Corvette off guard while Davidson was attempting to lap an unsighted Collard on the inside in the Porsche Curves. Collard spun backwards into the barrier, severely damaging the Corvette's rear. He was unhurt. Collard had difficulty returning to the garage for rear-end repairs and component changes, which took 32 minutes. Davidson, however, was immediately able to return to the pit lane and repair the Peugeot. The accident necessitated the race's fourth safety car intervention, which lasted nine minutes and allowed marshals to clear debris from the circuit and repair the damaged Armco barrier in the Porsche Curves.

After the restart, Lieb's No. 77 Felbermayr-Proton Porsche had taken over the LMGT2 lead that the No. 64 Corvette had held for 141 consecutive laps, with Allan Simonsen's No. 89 Farnbacher Ferrari second in class. Franchitti kept the Highcroft LMP2 entry second in class until a water leak problem and a cooling system pressure fault forced him to enter the garage several times and drop down the class order. Roland Bervillé beached the No. 50 Saleen in the gravel near the pit lane entry, causing concern at Larbre Compétition. Mechanics removed gravel from under the car, but it maintained its LMGT1 lead over the Young Driver team by six laps. Gavin retired the No. 64 Corvette on the Mulsanne corner exit with smoke billowing from the left-hand exhaust, a lasting legacy of Collard's earlier collision with Davidson. Giancarlo Fisichella locked the front tyres on the No. 95 AF Corse Ferrari and entered the escape road at Indianapolis corner. The resulting pit stop to repair front-end damage lost the Ferrari second in LMGT2 to Simonsen's No. 89 Farnbacher Ferrari.

Despite suffering a left-rear puncture that required bodywork repairs, Leventis' No. 42 Strakka retained the LMP2 lead over Guillaume Moreau's No. 35 OAK Pescarolo by five laps. Lotterer locked the No. 8 Audi's tyres at Arnage Corner and collided with the tyre wall, necessitating a pit stop for new front bodywork. After a brief battle, Wurz in the recovering No. 1 Peugeot passed Lotterer for second at the Michelin chicane before falling back behind the No. 8 Audi. Wurz had unlapped the lead Audi before retiring in the pit lane with white smoke billowing from the engine compartment's right-hand side turn due to connecting rod failure. The No. 1 Peugeot's retirement moved Kristensen's No. 7 Audi to third overall and Lapierre's No. 4 Oreca Peugeot to fourth. Rockenfeller made an unscheduled pit stop in the race-leading No. 9 Audi because he felt a vibration, which the team determined was caused by a wheel turned on the rim. Drive shaft failure forced Nygaard to enter the garage to allow mechanics to replace it, but the team dropped to third behind Policand's No. 72 Luc Alphand Aventures Corvette 15 minutes after he started the No. 52 Young Driver AMR car for its final stint. Duval relieved Lapierre in the No. 4 Oreca Peugeot and pulled within ten seconds of Rinaldo Capello's third-placed No. 7 Audi when Duval retired with flames shooting out of his car's right-hand underside into Indianapolis corner due to a major oil fire.

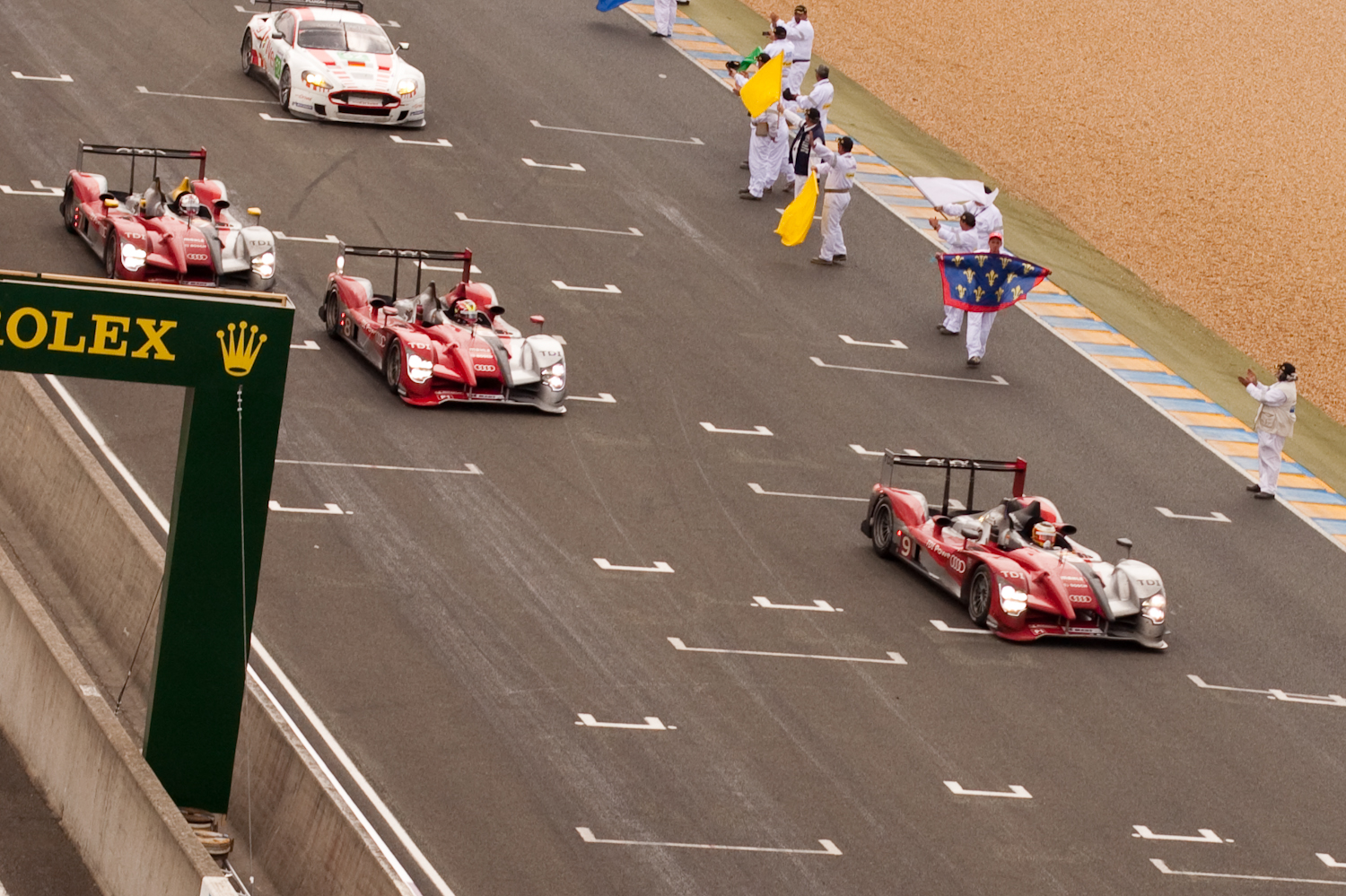
The No. 9 Audi leads the other two Audis in formation over the finish line to win the race

Bernhard, Dumas and Rockenfeller maintained the lead the No. 9 Audi had held for the final 133 laps. They achieved their first Le Mans victories and Audi's ninth since its first in 2000 in a record-breaking 397 laps, covering 5,410.713 km (3,362.061 mi). They finished one lap ahead of Fässler, Lotterer, and Tréluyer's sister No. 8 car in second, and Capello, Kristensen, and McNish's No. 7 car followed two laps later in third to complete an Audi podium sweep, its fourth at Le Mans. The No. 42 Strakka HPD car of Kane, Leventis, and Watts led the final 267 laps of LMP2 to win by six laps over the second-placed No. 35 OAK Pescarolo and nine laps over the third-placed No. 25 RML Lola car. Larbre Compétition held their four-lap lead in LMGT1, and Bervillé's, Julien Canal's and Gardel's No. 50 Saleen achieved the team's fifth class victory. The No. 72 LAA Corvette in second and the third-placed No. 52 Young Driver AMR Aston Martin completed the class order and podium. Following the No. 64 Corvette's retirement, the No. 77 Felbermayr-Proton Porsche won in LMGT2, earning Lieb and Richard Lietz their second category wins and Wolf Henzler his first. Team Farnbacher finished two laps behind the Porsche in second, and BMS Scuderia Italia were another nine laps behind in third.

== Post-race ==
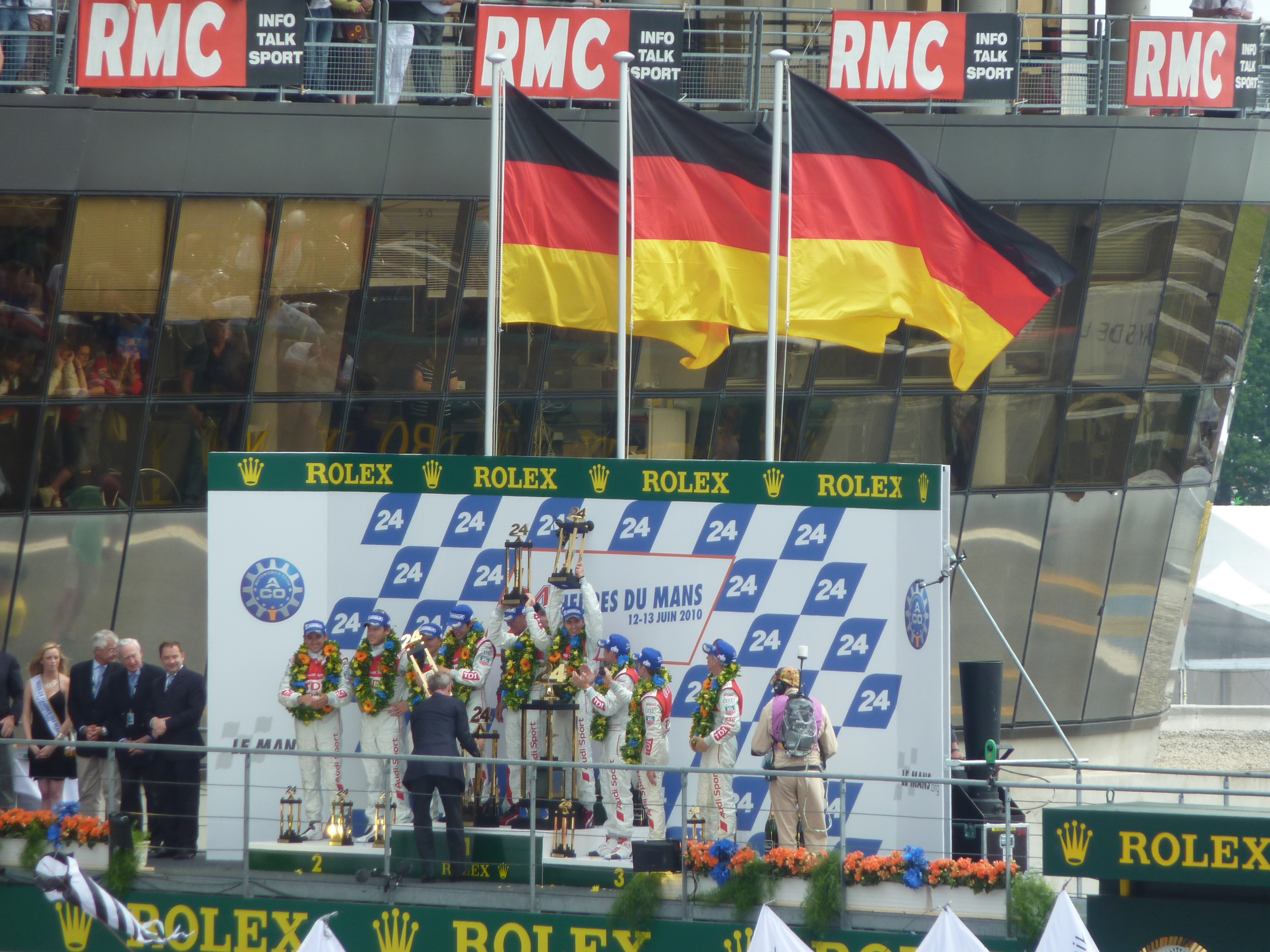
The post-race podium ceremony featuring the top three overall finishers.

The top three teams in each class collected trophies on the podium and appeared in the press conference. Dumas felt that despite some of the French press's predictions to the contrary, he believed he could win, adding: "We knew we had reliability, and that was very important I think – and we had no problems on the car. It just kept running and running without any mistakes." Bernhard commented, "We talked about it, among the three of us, about how it would feel just to stand on the podium with the whole crowd on the bottom cheering and then a couple of days later we achieved that." Rockenfeller expressed delight at having achieved his objective of winning at Le Mans, "I managed to win, with Timo (Bernhard) and Romain (Dumas). Thank you to everyone. My thanks to Audi, to the Joest team, our crew. Great!" Audi technical director Ralf Jüttner heralded the winning-Audi's distance record as reliability not becoming a factor, saying, "It's all about who is fast and who is slower."

Kristensen did not believe Priaulx had seen his approaching car, saying, "It's Le Mans, so you should always expect the unexpected – and in a way I guess you could say I didn't expect that enough, but when there's a BMW driving with three very good and professional drivers, I would expect them to see me and not change the racing line when I'm coming [behind] with a lot more speed." He later said that he had forgiven Priaulx, "At the time it was very frustrating, but when you look at the whole picture it is not so bad. We have finished on the podium. It's part of the way things work at this race." Priaulx admitted he was disappointed to have been a contributing factor in the accident, commenting, "It wasn't like a last minute thing that I decided to go left, but he had committed. People have told me I am not, but my gut feeling is that I am responsible, but sometimes I am very hard on myself." McNish said he did not expect Kristensen's collision to be the factor in the overall win.

Pagenaud affirmed Peugeot would return to win at Le Mans in 2011 and described the team's emotions after all three of their cars retired, "Everyone in the team is in tears. This team is like a family and to win this race would have meant so much to us." Davidson was pleased with his race performance and felt he could demonstrate his ability at Le Mans after being judged on his results in the high-profile Formula One series. He said he and Peugeot were inspired by potential victory before his quadruple stint was over. Audi chairman Rupert Stadler praised Peugeot's form during the race, "Peugeot was a formidable rival who required us to give everything." Strakka team manager Piers Phillips praised the team, saying, "Strakka is here for the long term, and this win, as fantastic as it is, is not the peak of our ambitions. It's the platform from which we can move forward. We've proved a point, set a precedent, and raised expectations." Canal admitted that his team did not expect to win in LMGT1, and team owner Jack Leconte was pleased to win the category as a privateer entry after previously receiving manufacturer support.

== Official results ==
Class winners are marked in bold. Cars failing to complete 70 per cent of winner's distance (277 laps) are marked as Not Classified (NC).

Final race results
Pos	Class	No	Team	Drivers	Chassis	Tyre	Laps	Time/Retired
Pos	Class	No	Team	Drivers	Engine	Tyre	Laps	Time/Retired
1	**LMP1**	**9**	**(Germany) Audi Sport North America**	**(Germany) Mike Rockenfeller (Germany) Timo Bernhard (France) Romain Dumas**	**Audi R15 TDI plus**	MI	**397**	**24:01'23.694**
1	**LMP1**	**9**	**(Germany) Audi Sport North America**	**(Germany) Mike Rockenfeller (Germany) Timo Bernhard (France) Romain Dumas**	**Audi TDI 5.5 L Turbo V10 (Diesel)**	MI	**397**	**24:01'23.694**
2	LMP1	8	(Germany) Audi Sport Team Joest	(Germany) André Lotterer (Switzerland) Marcel Fässler (France) Benoît Tréluyer	Audi R15 TDI plus	MI	396	+1 Lap
2	LMP1	8	(Germany) Audi Sport Team Joest	(Germany) André Lotterer (Switzerland) Marcel Fässler (France) Benoît Tréluyer	Audi TDI 5.5 L Turbo V10 (Diesel)	MI	396	+1 Lap
3	LMP1	7	(Germany) Audi Sport Team Joest	(Denmark) Tom Kristensen (United Kingdom) Allan McNish (Italy) Rinaldo Capello	Audi R15 TDI plus	MI	394	+3 Laps
3	LMP1	7	(Germany) Audi Sport Team Joest	(Denmark) Tom Kristensen (United Kingdom) Allan McNish (Italy) Rinaldo Capello	Audi TDI 5.5 L Turbo V10 (Diesel)	MI	394	+3 Laps
4	LMP1	6	(France) AIM Team Oreca Matmut	(France) Soheil Ayari (France) Didier André (United Kingdom) Andy Meyrick	Oreca 01	D	369	+28 Laps
4	LMP1	6	(France) AIM Team Oreca Matmut	(France) Soheil Ayari (France) Didier André (United Kingdom) Andy Meyrick	AIM YS5.5 5.5 L V10	D	369	+28 Laps
5	**LMP2**	**42**	**(United Kingdom) Strakka Racing**	**(United Kingdom) Nick Leventis (United Kingdom) Danny Watts (United Kingdom) Jonny Kane**	**HPD ARX-01C**	MI	**367**	**+30 Laps**
5	**LMP2**	**42**	**(United Kingdom) Strakka Racing**	**(United Kingdom) Nick Leventis (United Kingdom) Danny Watts (United Kingdom) Jonny Kane**	**HPD AL7R 3.4 L V8**	MI	**367**	**+30 Laps**
6	LMP1	007	(United Kingdom) Aston Martin Racing	(Switzerland) Harold Primat (Germany) Stefan Mücke (Mexico) Adrián Fernández	Lola-Aston Martin B09/60	MI	365	+32 Laps
6	LMP1	007	(United Kingdom) Aston Martin Racing	(Switzerland) Harold Primat (Germany) Stefan Mücke (Mexico) Adrián Fernández	Aston Martin 6.0 L V12	MI	365	+32 Laps
7	LMP2	35	(France) OAK Racing	(France) Matthieu Lahaye (France) Guillaume Moreau (Czech Republic) Jan Charouz	Pescarolo 01	D	361	+36 Laps
7	LMP2	35	(France) OAK Racing	(France) Matthieu Lahaye (France) Guillaume Moreau (Czech Republic) Jan Charouz	Judd DB 3.4 L V8	D	361	+36 Laps
8	LMP2	25	(United Kingdom) RML	(United Kingdom) Mike Newton (Brazil) Thomas Erdos (United Kingdom) Andy Wallace	Lola B08/80	D	358	+39 Laps
8	LMP2	25	(United Kingdom) RML	(United Kingdom) Mike Newton (Brazil) Thomas Erdos (United Kingdom) Andy Wallace	HPD AL7R 3.4 L V8	D	358	+39 Laps
9	LMP2	24	(France) OAK Racing	(France) Jacques Nicolet (Monaco) Richard Hein (France) Jean-François Yvon	Pescarolo 01	D	341	+56 Laps
9	LMP2	24	(France) OAK Racing	(France) Jacques Nicolet (Monaco) Richard Hein (France) Jean-François Yvon	Judd DB 3.4 L V8	D	341	+56 Laps
10	LMP2	41	(United Kingdom) Team Bruichladdich	(United Kingdom) Tim Greaves (Saudi Arabia) Karim Ojjeh (France) Gary Chalandon	Ginetta-Zytek GZ09S/2	D	341	+56 Laps
10	LMP2	41	(United Kingdom) Team Bruichladdich	(United Kingdom) Tim Greaves (Saudi Arabia) Karim Ojjeh (France) Gary Chalandon	Zytek ZG348 3.4 L V8	D	341	+56 Laps
11	**LMGT2**	**77**	**(Germany) Team Felbermayr-Proton**	**(Germany) Marc Lieb (Austria) Richard Lietz (Germany) Wolf Henzler**	**Porsche 997 GT3-RSR**	MI	**338**	**+59 Laps**
11	**LMGT2**	**77**	**(Germany) Team Felbermayr-Proton**	**(Germany) Marc Lieb (Austria) Richard Lietz (Germany) Wolf Henzler**	**Porsche 4.0 L Flat-6**	MI	**338**	**+59 Laps**
12	LMGT2	89	(Germany) Hankook Team Farnbacher	(Germany) Dominik Farnbacher (Denmark) Allan Simonsen (United States) Leh Keen	Ferrari F430 GT2	HK	336	+61 Laps
12	LMGT2	89	(Germany) Hankook Team Farnbacher	(Germany) Dominik Farnbacher (Denmark) Allan Simonsen (United States) Leh Keen	Ferrari 4.0 L V8	HK	336	+61 Laps
13	**LMGT1**	**50**	**(France) Larbre Compétition**	**(France) Roland Bervillé (France) Julien Canal (Switzerland) Gabriele Gardel**	**Saleen S7-R**	MI	**331**	**+66 Laps**
13	**LMGT1**	**50**	**(France) Larbre Compétition**	**(France) Roland Bervillé (France) Julien Canal (Switzerland) Gabriele Gardel**	**Ford 7.0 L V8**	MI	**331**	**+66 Laps**
14	LMGT2	97	(Italy) BMS Scuderia Italia SpA	(Germany) Marco Holzer (United Kingdom) Richard Westbrook (Germany) Timo Scheider	Porsche 997 GT3-RSR	MI	327	+70 Laps
14	LMGT2	97	(Italy) BMS Scuderia Italia SpA	(Germany) Marco Holzer (United Kingdom) Richard Westbrook (Germany) Timo Scheider	Porsche 4.0 L Flat-6	MI	327	+70 Laps
15	LMGT1	72	(France) Luc Alphand Aventures	(France) Stéphan Grégoire (France) Jérôme Policand (Netherlands) David Hart	Chevrolet Corvette C6.R	D	327	+70 Laps
15	LMGT1	72	(France) Luc Alphand Aventures	(France) Stéphan Grégoire (France) Jérôme Policand (Netherlands) David Hart	Corvette LS7.R 7.0 L V8	D	327	+70 Laps
16	LMGT2	95	(Italy) AF Corse SRL	(Italy) Giancarlo Fisichella (France) Jean Alesi (Finland) Toni Vilander	Ferrari F430 GT2	MI	323	+74 Laps
16	LMGT2	95	(Italy) AF Corse SRL	(Italy) Giancarlo Fisichella (France) Jean Alesi (Finland) Toni Vilander	Ferrari 4.0 L V8	MI	323	+74 Laps
17	LMGT2	76	(France) IMSA Performance Matmut	(France) Raymond Narac (France) Patrick Pilet (United States) Patrick Long	Porsche 997 GT3-RSR	MI	321	+76 Laps
17	LMGT2	76	(France) IMSA Performance Matmut	(France) Raymond Narac (France) Patrick Pilet (United States) Patrick Long	Porsche 4.0 L Flat-6	MI	321	+76 Laps
18	LMP2	28	(Switzerland) Race Performance AG	(France) Pierre Bruneau (France) Marc Rostan (Switzerland) Ralph Meichtry	Radical SR9	D	321	+76 Laps
18	LMP2	28	(Switzerland) Race Performance AG	(France) Pierre Bruneau (France) Marc Rostan (Switzerland) Ralph Meichtry	Judd DB 3.4 L V8	D	321	+76 Laps
19	LMGT2	78	(Germany) BMW Motorsport	(Germany) Jörg Müller (Brazil) Augusto Farfus (Germany) Uwe Alzen	BMW M3 GT2	D	320	+77 Laps
19	LMGT2	78	(Germany) BMW Motorsport	(Germany) Jörg Müller (Brazil) Augusto Farfus (Germany) Uwe Alzen	BMW 4.0 L V8	D	320	+77 Laps
20	LMP2	40	(Portugal) Quifel ASM Team	(Portugal) Miguel Amaral (France) Olivier Pla (United Kingdom) Warren Hughes	Ginetta-Zytek GZ09S/2	MI	318	+79 Laps
20	LMP2	40	(Portugal) Quifel ASM Team	(Portugal) Miguel Amaral (France) Olivier Pla (United Kingdom) Warren Hughes	Zytek ZG348 3.4 L V8	MI	318	+79 Laps
21	LMGT2	75	(Belgium) Prospeed Competition	(Netherlands) Paul van Splunteren (Netherlands) Niek Hommerson (Belgium) Louis Machiels	Porsche 997 GT3-RSR	MI	317	+80 Laps
21	LMGT2	75	(Belgium) Prospeed Competition	(Netherlands) Paul van Splunteren (Netherlands) Niek Hommerson (Belgium) Louis Machiels	Porsche 4.0 L Flat-6	MI	317	+80 Laps
22	LMGT1	52	(Germany) Young Driver AMR	(Czech Republic) Tomáš Enge (Denmark) Christoffer Nygaard (Netherlands) Peter Kox	Aston Martin DBR9	MI	311	+86 Laps
22	LMGT1	52	(Germany) Young Driver AMR	(Czech Republic) Tomáš Enge (Denmark) Christoffer Nygaard (Netherlands) Peter Kox	Aston Martin 6.0 L V12	MI	311	+86 Laps
23	LMP2	37	(France) Gerard Welter	(France) Philippe Salini (France) Stéphane Salini (France) Tristan Gommendy	WR LMP2008	D	308	+89 Laps
23	LMP2	37	(France) Gerard Welter	(France) Philippe Salini (France) Stéphane Salini (France) Tristan Gommendy	Zytek ZG348 3.4 L V8	D	308	+89 Laps
24	LMGT2	88	(Germany) Team Felbermayr-Proton	(Austria) Horst Felbermayr (Austria) Horst Felbermayr Jr. (Slovakia) Miro Konôpka	Porsche 997 GT3-RSR	MI	304	+93 Laps
24	LMGT2	88	(Germany) Team Felbermayr-Proton	(Austria) Horst Felbermayr (Austria) Horst Felbermayr Jr. (Slovakia) Miro Konôpka	Porsche 4.0 L Flat-6	MI	304	+93 Laps
25	LMP2	26	(United States) Highcroft Racing	(Australia) David Brabham (United Kingdom) Marino Franchitti (Germany) Marco Werner	HPD ARX-01C	MI	296	+101 Laps
25	LMP2	26	(United States) Highcroft Racing	(Australia) David Brabham (United Kingdom) Marino Franchitti (Germany) Marco Werner	HPD AL7R 3.4 L V8	MI	296	+101 Laps
26	LMP2	39	(Germany) KSM	(France) Jean de Pourtales (Japan) Hideki Noda (United Kingdom) Jonathan Kennard	Lola B07/40	D	291	+106 Laps
26	LMP2	39	(Germany) KSM	(France) Jean de Pourtales (Japan) Hideki Noda (United Kingdom) Jonathan Kennard	Judd DB 3.4 L V8	D	291	+106 Laps
27	LMGT2	85	(Netherlands) Spyker Squadron	(Netherlands) Tom Coronel (United Kingdom) Peter Dumbreck (Netherlands) Jeroen Bleekemolen	Spyker C8 Laviolette GT2-R	MI	280	+117 Laps
27	LMGT2	85	(Netherlands) Spyker Squadron	(Netherlands) Tom Coronel (United Kingdom) Peter Dumbreck (Netherlands) Jeroen Bleekemolen	Audi 4.0 L V8	MI	280	+117 Laps
NC	LMP1	11	(United Kingdom) Drayson Racing	(United Kingdom) Paul Drayson (United Kingdom) Jonny Cocker (Italy) Emanuele Pirro	Lola B09/60	MI	254	Insufficient distance
NC	LMP1	11	(United Kingdom) Drayson Racing	(United Kingdom) Paul Drayson (United Kingdom) Jonny Cocker (Italy) Emanuele Pirro	Judd GV5.5 S2 5.5 L V10	MI	254	Insufficient distance
DNF	LMP1	4	(France) Team Oreca Matmut	(France) Olivier Panis (France) Nicolas Lapierre (France) Loïc Duval	Peugeot 908 HDi FAP	MI	373	Engine
DNF	LMP1	4	(France) Team Oreca Matmut	(France) Olivier Panis (France) Nicolas Lapierre (France) Loïc Duval	Peugeot HDi 5.5 L Turbo V12 (Diesel)	MI	373	Engine
DNF	LMP1	009	(United Kingdom) Aston Martin Racing	(United Kingdom) Darren Turner (Denmark) Juan Barazi (United Kingdom) Sam Hancock	Lola-Aston Martin B09/60	MI	368	Engine
DNF	LMP1	009	(United Kingdom) Aston Martin Racing	(United Kingdom) Darren Turner (Denmark) Juan Barazi (United Kingdom) Sam Hancock	Aston Martin 6.0 L V12	MI	368	Engine
DNF	LMP1	1	(France) Team Peugeot Total	(Austria) Alexander Wurz (Spain) Marc Gené (United Kingdom) Anthony Davidson	Peugeot 908 HDi FAP	MI	360	Engine
DNF	LMP1	1	(France) Team Peugeot Total	(Austria) Alexander Wurz (Spain) Marc Gené (United Kingdom) Anthony Davidson	Peugeot HDi 5.5 L Turbo V12 (Diesel)	MI	360	Engine
DNF	LMP1	15	(Germany) Kolles	(Denmark) Christian Bakkerud (United Kingdom) Oliver Jarvis (Netherlands) Christijan Albers	Audi R10 TDI	MI	331	Gearbox
DNF	LMP1	15	(Germany) Kolles	(Denmark) Christian Bakkerud (United Kingdom) Oliver Jarvis (Netherlands) Christijan Albers	Audi TDI 5.5 L Turbo V12 (Diesel)	MI	331	Gearbox
DNF	LMP1	008	(France) Signature-Plus	(France) Pierre Ragues (France) Franck Mailleux (Belgium) Vanina Ickx	Lola-Aston Martin B09/60	D	302	Accident damage
DNF	LMP1	008	(France) Signature-Plus	(France) Pierre Ragues (France) Franck Mailleux (Belgium) Vanina Ickx	Aston Martin 6.0 L V12	D	302	Accident damage
DNF	LMP1	2	(France) Team Peugeot Total	(France) Nicolas Minassian (France) Stéphane Sarrazin (France) Franck Montagny	Peugeot 908 HDi FAP	MI	264	Engine
DNF	LMP1	2	(France) Team Peugeot Total	(France) Nicolas Minassian (France) Stéphane Sarrazin (France) Franck Montagny	Peugeot HDi 5.5 L Turbo V12 (Diesel)	MI	264	Engine
DNF	LMGT2	64	(United States) Corvette Racing	(United Kingdom) Oliver Gavin (Monaco) Olivier Beretta (France) Emmanuel Collard	Chevrolet Corvette C6.R	MI	255	Exhaust
DNF	LMGT2	64	(United States) Corvette Racing	(United Kingdom) Oliver Gavin (Monaco) Olivier Beretta (France) Emmanuel Collard	Corvette LS5.R 5.5 L V8	MI	255	Exhaust
DNF	LMGT1	73	(France) Luc Alphand Aventures	(France) Julien Jousse (Netherlands) Xavier Maassen (France) Patrice Goueslard	Chevrolet Corvette C6.R	D	238	Transmission
DNF	LMGT1	73	(France) Luc Alphand Aventures	(France) Julien Jousse (Netherlands) Xavier Maassen (France) Patrice Goueslard	Corvette LS7.R 7.0 L V8	D	238	Transmission
DNF	LMGT2	63	(United States) Corvette Racing	(United States) Johnny O'Connell (Denmark) Jan Magnussen (Spain) Antonio García	Chevrolet Corvette C6.R	MI	225	Engine
DNF	LMGT2	63	(United States) Corvette Racing	(United States) Johnny O'Connell (Denmark) Jan Magnussen (Spain) Antonio García	Corvette LS5.R 5.5 L V8	MI	225	Engine
DNF	LMGT2	83	(United States) Risi Competizione	(United States) Tracy Krohn (Sweden) Niclas Jönsson (Belgium) Eric van de Poele	Ferrari F430 GT2	MI	197	Engine
DNF	LMGT2	83	(United States) Risi Competizione	(United States) Tracy Krohn (Sweden) Niclas Jönsson (Belgium) Eric van de Poele	Ferrari 4.0 L V8	MI	197	Engine
DNF	LMP1	14	(Germany) Kolles	(United States) Scott Tucker (Portugal) Manuel Rodrigues (France) Christophe Bouchut	Audi R10 TDI	MI	182	Accident damage
DNF	LMP1	14	(Germany) Kolles	(United States) Scott Tucker (Portugal) Manuel Rodrigues (France) Christophe Bouchut	Audi TDI 5.5 L Turbo V12 (Diesel)	MI	182	Accident damage
DNF	LMP1	12	(Switzerland) Rebellion Racing	(France) Nicolas Prost (Switzerland) Neel Jani (United States) Marco Andretti	Lola B10/60	MI	175	Gearbox
DNF	LMP1	12	(Switzerland) Rebellion Racing	(France) Nicolas Prost (Switzerland) Neel Jani (United States) Marco Andretti	Rebellion 5.5 L V10	MI	175	Gearbox
DNF	LMGT1	60	(Switzerland) Matech Competition	(Germany) Thomas Mutsch (Switzerland) Romain Grosjean (Switzerland) Jonathan Hirschi	Ford GT1	MI	171	Engine
DNF	LMGT1	60	(Switzerland) Matech Competition	(Germany) Thomas Mutsch (Switzerland) Romain Grosjean (Switzerland) Jonathan Hirschi	Ford 5.3 L V8	MI	171	Engine
DNF	LMP1	13	(Switzerland) Rebellion Racing	(France) Jean-Christophe Boullion (Italy) Andrea Belicchi (United Kingdom) Guy Smith	Lola B10/60	MI	143	Accident
DNF	LMP1	13	(Switzerland) Rebellion Racing	(France) Jean-Christophe Boullion (Italy) Andrea Belicchi (United Kingdom) Guy Smith	Rebellion 5.5 L V10	MI	143	Accident
DNF	LMGT1	69	(Japan) JLOC	(Japan) Atsushi Yogo (Japan) Koji Yamanishi (Japan) Hiroyuki Iiri	Lamborghini Murciélago LP670 R-SV	Y	138	Gearbox
DNF	LMGT1	69	(Japan) JLOC	(Japan) Atsushi Yogo (Japan) Koji Yamanishi (Japan) Hiroyuki Iiri	Lamborghini 6.5 L V12	Y	138	Gearbox
DNF	LMGT2	82	(United States) Risi Competizione	(Brazil) Jaime Melo (Italy) Gianmaria Bruni (Germany) Pierre Kaffer	Ferrari F430 GT2	MI	116	Gearbox
DNF	LMGT2	82	(United States) Risi Competizione	(Brazil) Jaime Melo (Italy) Gianmaria Bruni (Germany) Pierre Kaffer	Ferrari 4.0 L V8	MI	116	Gearbox
DNF	LMGT2	92	(United Kingdom) JMW Motorsport	(United Kingdom) Rob Bell (United Kingdom) Tim Sugden (United States) Bryce Miller	Aston Martin V8 Vantage GT2	D	71	Accident
DNF	LMGT2	92	(United Kingdom) JMW Motorsport	(United Kingdom) Rob Bell (United Kingdom) Tim Sugden (United States) Bryce Miller	Aston Martin-Jaguar 4.5 L V8	D	71	Accident
DNF	LMGT2	80	(United States) Flying Lizard Motorsports	(United States) Seth Neiman (United States) Darren Law (Germany) Jörg Bergmeister	Porsche 997 GT3-RSR	MI	61	Radiator
DNF	LMGT2	80	(United States) Flying Lizard Motorsports	(United States) Seth Neiman (United States) Darren Law (Germany) Jörg Bergmeister	Porsche 4.0 L Flat-6	MI	61	Radiator
DNF	LMGT1	61	(Switzerland) Matech Competition	(Switzerland) Natacha Gachnang (Switzerland) Cyndie Allemann (Switzerland) Rahel Frey	Ford GT1	MI	59	Engine fire
DNF	LMGT1	61	(Switzerland) Matech Competition	(Switzerland) Natacha Gachnang (Switzerland) Cyndie Allemann (Switzerland) Rahel Frey	Ford 5.3 L V8	MI	59	Engine fire
DNF	LMP2	29	(Italy) Racing Box SRL	(Italy) Luca Pirri (Italy) Marco Cioci (Italy) Piergiuseppe Perazzini	Lola B08/80	D	57	Suspension
DNF	LMP2	29	(Italy) Racing Box SRL	(Italy) Luca Pirri (Italy) Marco Cioci (Italy) Piergiuseppe Perazzini	Judd DB 3.4 L V8	D	57	Suspension
DNF	LMGT2	79	(Germany) BMW Motorsport	(United Kingdom) Andy Priaulx (Germany) Dirk Müller (Germany) Dirk Werner	BMW M3 GT2	D	53	Fuel sensor
DNF	LMGT2	79	(Germany) BMW Motorsport	(United Kingdom) Andy Priaulx (Germany) Dirk Müller (Germany) Dirk Werner	BMW 4.0 L V8	D	53	Fuel sensor
DNF	LMP2	38	(France) Pegasus Racing	(France) Julien Schell (France) Frédéric da Rocha (France) David Zollinger	Norma M200P	D	40	Accident damage
DNF	LMP2	38	(France) Pegasus Racing	(France) Julien Schell (France) Frédéric da Rocha (France) David Zollinger	Judd DB 3.4 L V8	D	40	Accident damage
DNF	LMP1	3	(France) Peugeot Sport Total	(France) Sébastien Bourdais (Portugal) Pedro Lamy (France) Simon Pagenaud	Peugeot 908 HDi FAP	MI	38	Suspension
DNF	LMP1	3	(France) Peugeot Sport Total	(France) Sébastien Bourdais (Portugal) Pedro Lamy (France) Simon Pagenaud	Peugeot HDi 5.5 L Turbo V12 (Diesel)	MI	38	Suspension
DNF	LMGT1	70	(Belgium) Marc VDS Racing Team	(Belgium) Eric De Doncker (Belgium) Bas Leinders (Finland) Markus Palttala	Ford GT1	MI	26	Accident damage
DNF	LMGT1	70	(Belgium) Marc VDS Racing Team	(Belgium) Eric De Doncker (Belgium) Bas Leinders (Finland) Markus Palttala	Ford 5.0 L V8	MI	26	Accident damage
DNF	LMP1	5	(United Kingdom) Beechdean Mansell	(United Kingdom) Nigel Mansell (United Kingdom) Greg Mansell (United Kingdom) Leo Mansell	Ginetta-Zytek GZ09S	D	4	Accident
DNF	LMP1	5	(United Kingdom) Beechdean Mansell	(United Kingdom) Nigel Mansell (United Kingdom) Greg Mansell (United Kingdom) Leo Mansell	Zytek ZJ458 4.5 L V8	D	4	Accident
DNF	LMGT2	81	(United States) Jaguar RSR	(United States) Paul Gentilozzi (United Kingdom) Ryan Dalziel (Belgium) Marc Goossens	Jaguar XKR GT2	Y	4	Electrical
DNF	LMGT2	81	(United States) Jaguar RSR	(United States) Paul Gentilozzi (United Kingdom) Ryan Dalziel (Belgium) Marc Goossens	Jaguar 5.0 L V8	Y	4	Electrical
DNF	LMP1	19	(United States) Michael Lewis/Autocon	(United States) Michael Lewis (United States) Bryan Willman (Canada) Tony Burgess	Lola B06/10	D	1	Gearbox
DNF	LMP1	19	(United States) Michael Lewis/Autocon	(United States) Michael Lewis (United States) Bryan Willman (Canada) Tony Burgess	AER P32T 4.0 L Turbo V8	D	1	Gearbox
WD	LMGT2	96	(Italy) AF Corse SRL	(Argentina) Luis Pérez Companc (Argentina) Matías Russo (Finland) Mika Salo	Ferrari F430 GT2	MI	–	Withdrawn
WD	LMGT2	96	(Italy) AF Corse SRL	(Argentina) Luis Pérez Companc (Argentina) Matías Russo (Finland) Mika Salo	Ferrari 4.0 L V8	MI	–	Withdrawn

Tyre manufacturers
Key
Symbol	Tyre manufacturer
**D**	Dunlop
**HK**	Hankook
**MI**	Michelin
**Y**	Yokohama
