= Gary Chalandon =

French racing driver

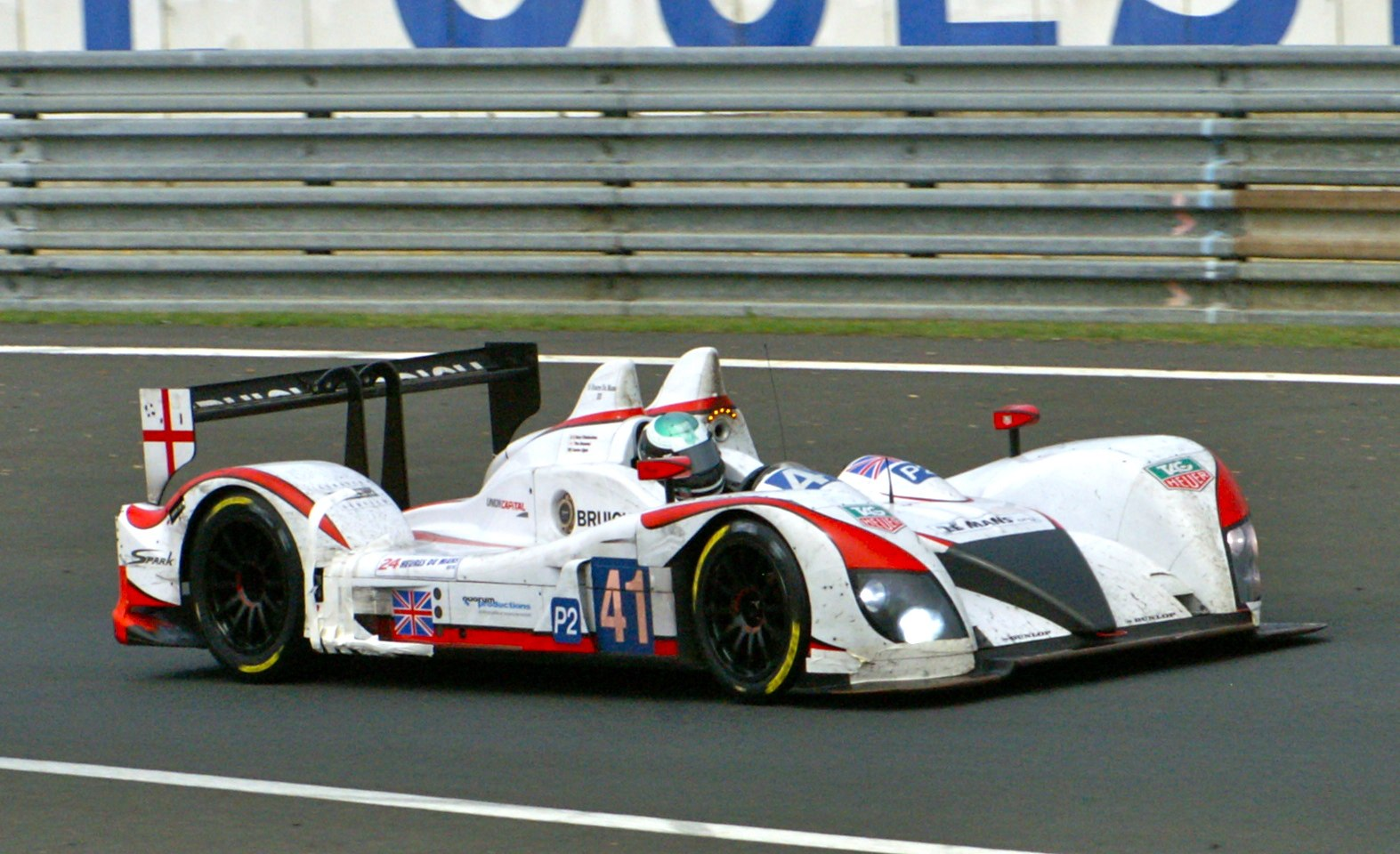
- Chalandon in 2010
- Nationality: (France) French
- Born: 26 September 1986 (age 40) Décines-Charpieu, France
- Categorisation: FIA Silver

Previous series
- 2011 2011 2010 2010–2011 2009 2008 2005: European GT3; FFSA GT; 24 Hours of Le Mans; LMS; FLM; Formul'Academy Euro Series; French Karting Championship

Championship titles
- 2010: FLM
24 Hours of Le Mans career
- Years: 2010
- Teams: Team Bruichladdich
- Best finish: 10th (2010)

Gary Chalandon (born 26 September 1986) is a French racing driver. He is most notable for competing in the 24 Hours of Le Mans, Formula Le Mans Cup and the Le Mans Series. He won the Formula Le Mans class of the Le Mans Series in 2010, whilst driving for DAMS.

== Career ==
Chalandon was born in Décines-Charpieu, France on 26 September 1986. He competed in the X30 class of the French Karting Championship in 2005, finishing fifth, before making his car racing debut in the Formul'Academy Euro Series in 2008, where he finished twentieth, with one point. He joined the Formula Le Mans Cup in 2009, driving for Boutsen Energy Racing in their LS3-engined Oreca FLM09. Partnering fellow Frenchman Dimitri Enjalbert, he made his debut in the series in the Algarve round, finishing third in race one, and fifth in race two. He drove alongside Enjalbert again for the Nürburgring round, finishing third in race one (having qualified on pole), and fourth in race two. Enjalbert was replaced by the Austrian Dominik Kraihamer for the next round at Silverstone, with the best finish of the weekend being fifth in race one. He was partnered by another Frenchman, Johan-Boris Scheier, in the season finale at Magny-Cours, with their best result being a third place in race two. He finished seventh overall in the championship, with 89 points from 12 races.

In 2010, the Formula Le Mans Cup was incorporated into the Le Mans Series, and Chalandon joined DAMS, partnering Andrea Barlesi and Alessandro Cicognani. In the first round of the season, the 8 Hours of Le Castellet, the trio finished in third place in class, in their first ever Le Mans Series race. The next round, the 1000 km of Spa, was unsuccessful, with the team being forced to retire the car due to steering damage. Following an injury to Team Bruichladdich driver Christian Ebbesvik during the 1000 km of Spa, Chalandon was named as his replacement for the 24 Hours of Le Mans. Chalandon, partnering Bruichladdich's regular drivers Tim Greaves and Karim Ojjeh, entered in the LMP2 category, driving a Ginetta-Zytek GZ09S/2. The team finished fifth in the LMP2 category, with Chalandon drawing praise from Tim Greaves, who said "Gary did extremely well in his first Le Mans practice and qualifying. He is one of the youngest drivers on the grid and we are very pleased with all aspects of his driving and attitude." Following the 24 Hours of Le Mans, Chalandon returned to the Le Mans Series, finishing second in class at the next round, the 1000 km of Algarve. This was followed by his first class ever victory in the following round, the 1000 km of Hungaroring. The 1000 km of Silverstone was the final race of the season, and fourth in class was enough to take the Formula Le Mans title by two points, with Hope Polevision Racing's Steve Zacchia finishing second.

For 2011, Chalandon rejoined Team Bruichladdich, this time in the LMP2 category of the Le Mans Series. He was partnered by Tom Kimber-Smith and Ojjeh in the new Zytek Z11SN. However, his first race for the team, whom had been renamed to Greaves Motorsport prior to the start of the season, came in the third Sportscars Winter Series event of the season on 6 March 2011, taking a victory, a fourth place, and a sixth-place finish, driving alongside Ojjeh in a Radical. In the Le Mans Series, the team won their class in the first round of the season, the 6 Hours of Castellet, and third overall. For the 24 Hours of Le Mans test session, Chalandon, Ojjeh and Kimber-Smith were partnered by Alex Brundle, with Kimber-Smith setting the third fastest time in the LMP2 class. The second round of the Le Mans Series, which was the 1000 km of Spa, proved to be less successful than the previous two events, with Greaves Motorsport only able to finish eighth in class, after an incident-filled race. This would prove to be the last time Chalandon drove for Greaves Motorsport, as he left the team, and was replaced by Olivier Lombard. His two races were enough for 11th in the LMP2 category, with 20 points. Chalandon switched to the FFSA GT Championship, and entered the Magny-Cours round on 10 July, driving alongside Didier André in a Team WRT-entered Audi R8 LMS. The pair finished fourteenth in the first race, and fifteenth in the second. A week later, André and Chalandon entered the Paul Ricard round of the FIA GT3 European Championship, finishing sixteenth in race one, and twelfth in race two.
