= Radical SR9 =

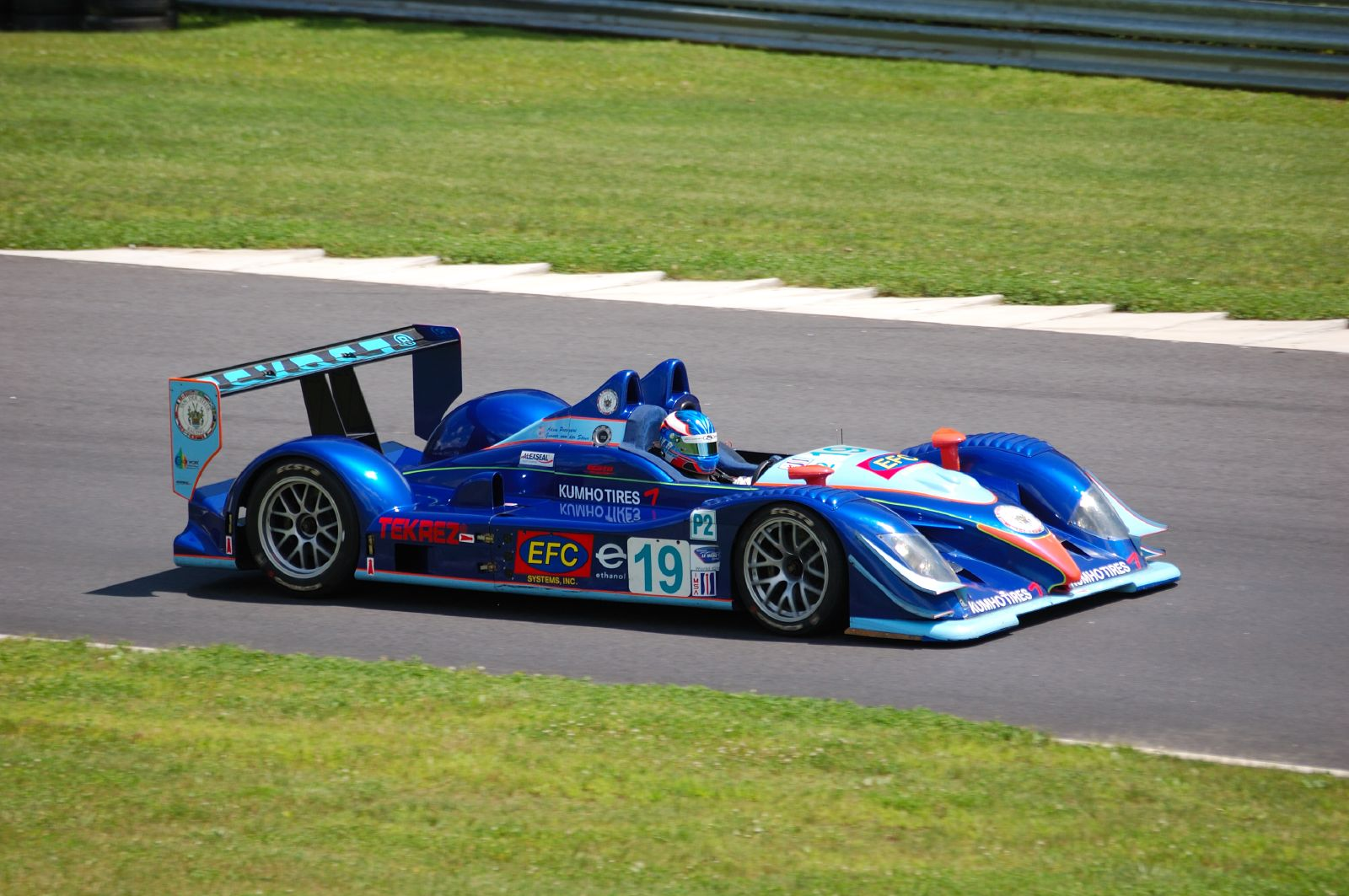

Overview
- Manufacturer: Radical Sportscars
- Production: 2006
- Assembly: Peterborough, UK
- Designer: Peter Elleray; Nick Walford

Body and chassis
- Class: LMP2
- Layout: longitudinal mounted mid-engine, rear-wheel drive
- Chassis: Carbon-fiber monocoque

Powertrain
- Engine: Judd XV675 3.4 L (210 cu in) 90° DOHC V8 naturally-aspirated; AER P07D 2.0 L (120 cu in) DOHC I4 naturally-aspirated
- Transmission: Ricardo 6-speed sequential manual

Dimensions
- Curb weight: 775 kg (1,708.6 lb)

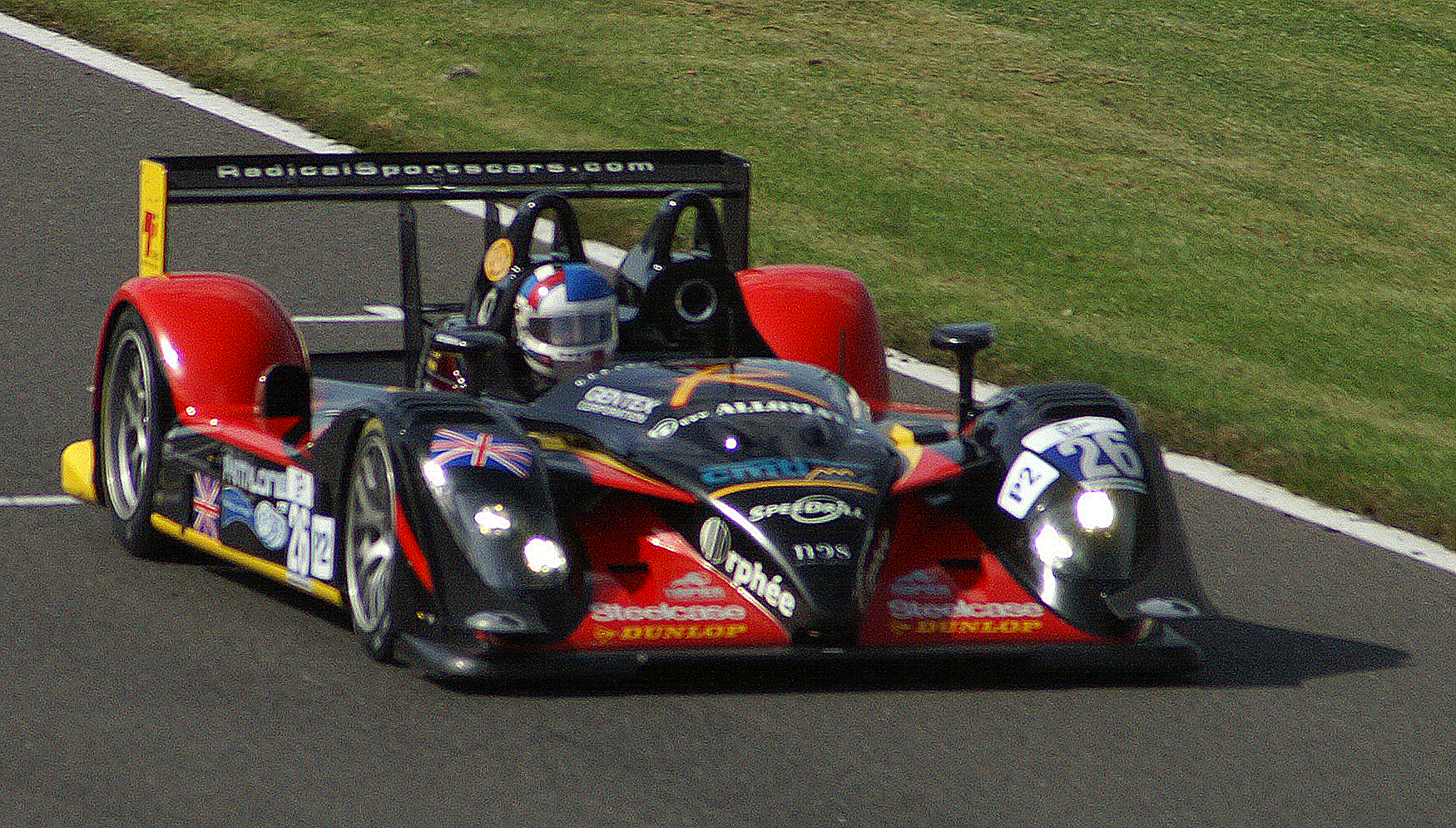
Bruichladdich Bruneau Radical SR9-AER at the 2009 1000 km of Silverstone.

The Radical SR9 is a sports prototype race car, designed, developed and produced by Radical for sports car racing, built to LMP2 regulations, produced in 2006.
