= 2014 6 Hours of Shanghai =

Sports car endurance race held at Shanghai International Circuit

Shanghai International Circuit

The 2014 6 Hours of Shanghai was an endurance sports car racing event held at the Shanghai International Circuit, Shanghai, China on 31 October–2 November 2014, and served as the sixth race of the 2014 FIA World Endurance Championship season. The race was won by Sébastien Buemi and Anthony Davidson driving the No. 8 Toyota TS040 Hybrid car.

== Qualifying ==
=== Qualifying result ===
Pole position winners in each class are marked in bold.

Pos	Class	Team	Average Time	Grid
1	**LMP1-H**	**No. 14 Porsche Team**	**1:48.300**	1
2	LMP1-H	No. 8 Toyota Racing	1:48.300	2
3	LMP1-H	No. 20 Porsche Team	1:48.324	3
4	LMP1-H	No. 7 Toyota Racing	1:48.534	4
5	LMP1-H	No. 1 Audi Sport Team Joest	1:49.454	5
6	LMP1-H	No. 2 Audi Sport Team Joest	1:50.072	6
7	**LMP1-L**	**No. 12 Rebellion Racing**	**1:52.431**	7
8	LMP1-L	No. 13 Rebellion Racing	1:53.314	8
9	**LMP2**	**No. 26 G-Drive Racing**	**1:54.327**	9
10	LMP2	No. 47 KCMG	1:55.301	10
11	LMP2	No. 37 SMP Racing	1:56.437	11
12	LMP2	No. 27 SMP Racing	1:56.539	12
13	LMP1-L	No. 9 Lotus	1:56.770	13
14	LMP2	No. 31 Extreme Speed Motorsports	1:56.901	14
15	LMP2	No. 30 Extreme Speed Motorsports	1:56.987	15
16	LMP2	No. 35 OAK Racing	1:57.365	16
17	**LMGTE Pro**	**No. 97 Aston Martin Racing**	**2:04.342**	17
18	LMGTE Pro	No. 92 Porsche Team Manthey	2:04.444	18
19	LMGTE Pro	No. 91 Porsche Team Manthey	2:04.599	19
20	LMGTE Pro	No. 51 AF Corse	2:04.780	20
21	LMGTE Pro	No. 71 AF Corse	2:04.822	21
22	LMGTE Pro	No. 99 Aston Martin Racing	2:04.847	22
23	**LMGTE Am**	**No. 98 Aston Martin Racing**	**2:05.072**	23
24	LMGTE Am	No. 75 Prospeed Competition	2:05.150	24
25	LMGTE Am	No. 95 Aston Martin Racing	2:05.203	25
26	LMGTE Am	No. 90 8 Star Motorsports	2:05.516	26
27	LMGTE Am	No. 88 Proton Competition	2:06.188	27

== Race ==
=== Race result ===
Class winners in bold.

Pos	Class	No	Team	Drivers	Chassis	Tyre	Laps
Pos	Class	No	Team	Drivers	Engine	Tyre	Laps
1	**LMP1-H**	**8**	**(Japan) Toyota Racing**	**(United Kingdom) Anthony Davidson (Switzerland) Sébastien Buemi**	**Toyota TS040 Hybrid**	MI	**188**
1	**LMP1-H**	**8**	**(Japan) Toyota Racing**	**(United Kingdom) Anthony Davidson (Switzerland) Sébastien Buemi**	**Toyota 3.7 L V8**	MI	**188**
2	LMP1-H	7	(Japan) Toyota Racing	(Austria) Alexander Wurz (France) Stéphane Sarrazin (Japan) Kazuki Nakajima	Toyota TS040 Hybrid	MI	188
2	LMP1-H	7	(Japan) Toyota Racing	(Austria) Alexander Wurz (France) Stéphane Sarrazin (Japan) Kazuki Nakajima	Toyota 3.7 L V8	MI	188
3	LMP1-H	14	(Germany) Porsche Team	(Germany) Marc Lieb (France) Romain Dumas (Switzerland) Neel Jani	Porsche 919 Hybrid	MI	187
3	LMP1-H	14	(Germany) Porsche Team	(Germany) Marc Lieb (France) Romain Dumas (Switzerland) Neel Jani	Porsche 2.0 L Turbo V4	MI	187
4	LMP1-H	2	(Germany) Audi Sport Team Joest	(Germany) André Lotterer (Switzerland) Marcel Fässler (France) Benoît Tréluyer	Audi R18 e-tron quattro	MI	187
4	LMP1-H	2	(Germany) Audi Sport Team Joest	(Germany) André Lotterer (Switzerland) Marcel Fässler (France) Benoît Tréluyer	Audi TDI 4.0 L Turbo V6 (Diesel)	MI	187
5	LMP1-H	1	(Germany) Audi Sport Team Joest	(Denmark) Tom Kristensen (France) Loïc Duval (Brazil) Lucas di Grassi	Audi R18 e-tron quattro	MI	187
5	LMP1-H	1	(Germany) Audi Sport Team Joest	(Denmark) Tom Kristensen (France) Loïc Duval (Brazil) Lucas di Grassi	Audi TDI 4.0 L Turbo V6 (Diesel)	MI	187
6	LMP1-H	20	(Germany) Porsche Team	(Germany) Timo Bernhard (New Zealand) Brendon Hartley (Australia) Mark Webber	Porsche 919 Hybrid	MI	186
6	LMP1-H	20	(Germany) Porsche Team	(Germany) Timo Bernhard (New Zealand) Brendon Hartley (Australia) Mark Webber	Porsche 2.0 L Turbo V4	MI	186
7	**LMP1-L**	**12**	**(Switzerland) Rebellion Racing**	**(France) Nicolas Prost (Germany) Nick Heidfeld (Switzerland) Mathias Beche**	**Rebellion R-One**	MI	**180**
7	**LMP1-L**	**12**	**(Switzerland) Rebellion Racing**	**(France) Nicolas Prost (Germany) Nick Heidfeld (Switzerland) Mathias Beche**	**Toyota RV8KLM 3.4 L V8**	MI	**180**
8	LMP1-L	13	(Switzerland) Rebellion Racing	(Austria) Dominik Kraihamer (Italy) Andrea Belicchi (Switzerland) Fabio Leimer	Rebellion R-One	MI	180
8	LMP1-L	13	(Switzerland) Rebellion Racing	(Austria) Dominik Kraihamer (Italy) Andrea Belicchi (Switzerland) Fabio Leimer	Toyota RV8KLM 3.4 L V8	MI	180
9	**LMP2**	**26**	**(Russia) G-Drive Racing**	**(Russia) Roman Rusinov (France) Olivier Pla (France) Julien Canal**	**Ligier JS P2**	D	**177**
9	**LMP2**	**26**	**(Russia) G-Drive Racing**	**(Russia) Roman Rusinov (France) Olivier Pla (France) Julien Canal**	**Nissan VK45DE 4.5 L V8**	D	**177**
10	LMP2	30	(United States) Extreme Speed Motorsports	(United States) Scott Sharp (Mexico) Ricardo González (United Kingdom) Ryan Dalziel	HPD ARX-03b	D	174
10	LMP2	30	(United States) Extreme Speed Motorsports	(United States) Scott Sharp (Mexico) Ricardo González (United Kingdom) Ryan Dalziel	Honda HR28TT 2.8 L Turbo V6	D	174
11	LMP2	27	(Russia) SMP Racing	(Russia) Sergey Zlobin (Italy) Maurizio Mediani (France) Nicolas Minassian	Oreca 03R	MI	174
11	LMP2	27	(Russia) SMP Racing	(Russia) Sergey Zlobin (Italy) Maurizio Mediani (France) Nicolas Minassian	Nissan VK45DE 4.5 L V8	MI	174
12	LMP2	37	(Russia) SMP Racing	(Russia) Kirill Ladygin (Russia) Anton Ladygin (Russia) Viktor Shaitar	Oreca 03R	MI	174
12	LMP2	37	(Russia) SMP Racing	(Russia) Kirill Ladygin (Russia) Anton Ladygin (Russia) Viktor Shaitar	Nissan VK45DE 4.5 L V8	MI	174
13	LMP2	31	(United States) Extreme Speed Motorsports	(United States) Ed Brown (United States) Johannes van Overbeek (Australia) David Brabham	HPD ARX-03b	D	173
13	LMP2	31	(United States) Extreme Speed Motorsports	(United States) Ed Brown (United States) Johannes van Overbeek (Australia) David Brabham	Honda HR28TT 2.8 L Turbo V6	D	173
14	LMP1-L	9	(Romania) Lotus	(Austria) Lucas Auer (Germany) Pierre Kaffer	CLM P1/01	MI	171
14	LMP1-L	9	(Romania) Lotus	(Austria) Lucas Auer (Germany) Pierre Kaffer	AER P60 Turbo V6	MI	171
15	LMP2	35	(France) OAK Racing	(United States) Mark Patterson (China) David Cheng (China) Ho-Pin Tung	Morgan LMP2	D	167
15	LMP2	35	(France) OAK Racing	(United States) Mark Patterson (China) David Cheng (China) Ho-Pin Tung	Judd HK 3.6 L V8	D	167
16	**LMGTE; Pro**	**92**	**(Germany) Porsche Team Manthey**	**(France) Patrick Pilet (France) Frédéric Makowiecki**	**Porsche 911 RSR**	MI	**167**
16	**LMGTE; Pro**	**92**	**(Germany) Porsche Team Manthey**	**(France) Patrick Pilet (France) Frédéric Makowiecki**	**Porsche 4.0 L Flat-6**	MI	**167**
17	LMGTE; Pro	91	(Germany) Porsche Team Manthey	(Germany) Jörg Bergmeister (Austria) Richard Lietz	Porsche 911 RSR	MI	167
17	LMGTE; Pro	91	(Germany) Porsche Team Manthey	(Germany) Jörg Bergmeister (Austria) Richard Lietz	Porsche 4.0 L Flat-6	MI	167
18	LMGTE; Pro	71	(Italy) AF Corse	(Italy) Davide Rigon (United Kingdom) James Calado	Ferrari 458 Italia GT2	MI	166
18	LMGTE; Pro	71	(Italy) AF Corse	(Italy) Davide Rigon (United Kingdom) James Calado	Ferrari 4.5 L V8	MI	166
19	LMGTE; Pro	99	(United Kingdom) Aston Martin Racing	(Hong Kong) Darryl O'Young (United Kingdom) Alex MacDowall (Brazil) Fernando Rees	Aston Martin V8 Vantage GTE	MI	166
19	LMGTE; Pro	99	(United Kingdom) Aston Martin Racing	(Hong Kong) Darryl O'Young (United Kingdom) Alex MacDowall (Brazil) Fernando Rees	Aston Martin 4.5 L V8	MI	166
20	**LMGTE; Am**	**98**	**(United Kingdom) Aston Martin Racing**	**(Canada) Paul Dalla Lana (Portugal) Pedro Lamy (Denmark) Christoffer Nygaard**	**Aston Martin V8 Vantage GTE**	MI	**165**
20	**LMGTE; Am**	**98**	**(United Kingdom) Aston Martin Racing**	**(Canada) Paul Dalla Lana (Portugal) Pedro Lamy (Denmark) Christoffer Nygaard**	**Aston Martin 4.5 L V8**	MI	**165**
21	LMGTE; Am	95	(United Kingdom) Aston Martin Racing	(Denmark) David Heinemeier Hansson (Denmark) Kristian Poulsen (New Zealand) Richie Stanaway	Aston Martin V8 Vantage GTE	MI	165
21	LMGTE; Am	95	(United Kingdom) Aston Martin Racing	(Denmark) David Heinemeier Hansson (Denmark) Kristian Poulsen (New Zealand) Richie Stanaway	Aston Martin 4.5 L V8	MI	165
22	LMGTE; Am	90	(United States) 8 Star Motorsports	(Italy) Matteo Cressoni (Italy) Paolo Ruberti (Italy) Gianluca Roda	Ferrari 458 Italia GT2	MI	164
22	LMGTE; Am	90	(United States) 8 Star Motorsports	(Italy) Matteo Cressoni (Italy) Paolo Ruberti (Italy) Gianluca Roda	Ferrari 4.5 L V8	MI	164
23	LMGTE; Am	75	(Belgium) Prospeed Competition	(France) François Perrodo (France) Matthieu Vaxivière (France) Emmanuel Collard	Porsche 911 RSR	MI	163
23	LMGTE; Am	75	(Belgium) Prospeed Competition	(France) François Perrodo (France) Matthieu Vaxivière (France) Emmanuel Collard	Porsche 4.0 L Flat-6	MI	163
24	LMGTE; Am	88	(Germany) Proton Competition	(Germany) Christian Ried (Germany) Wolf Henzler (United Arab Emirates) Khaled Al Qubaisi	Porsche 911 RSR	MI	161
24	LMGTE; Am	88	(Germany) Proton Competition	(Germany) Christian Ried (Germany) Wolf Henzler (United Arab Emirates) Khaled Al Qubaisi	Porsche 4.0 L Flat-6	MI	161
DNF	LMGTE; Pro	97	(United Kingdom) Aston Martin Racing	(United Kingdom) Darren Turner (Germany) Stefan Mücke	Aston Martin V8 Vantage GTE	MI	123
DNF	LMGTE; Pro	97	(United Kingdom) Aston Martin Racing	(United Kingdom) Darren Turner (Germany) Stefan Mücke	Aston Martin 4.5 L V8	MI	123
DNF	LMP2	47	(Hong Kong) KCMG	(United Kingdom) Matthew Howson (United Kingdom) Richard Bradley (Switzerland) Alexandre Imperatori	Oreca 03R	D	0
DNF	LMP2	47	(Hong Kong) KCMG	(United Kingdom) Matthew Howson (United Kingdom) Richard Bradley (Switzerland) Alexandre Imperatori	Nissan VK45DE 4.5 L V8	D	0
DNF	LMGTE; Pro	51	(Italy) AF Corse	(Italy) Gianmaria Bruni (Finland) Toni Vilander	Ferrari 458 Italia GT2	MI	0
DNF	LMGTE; Pro	51	(Italy) AF Corse	(Italy) Gianmaria Bruni (Finland) Toni Vilander	Ferrari 4.5 L V8	MI	0

FIA World Endurance Championship
Previous race: 6 Hours of Fuji	2014 season	Next race: 6 Hours of Bahrain
