= 2014 6 Hours of Fuji =

Sports car racing event

Fuji Speedway map

The 2014 6 Hours of Fuji was an endurance sports car racing event held at the Fuji Speedway, Oyama, Japan on 10–12 October 2014, and served as the fifth race of the 2014 FIA World Endurance Championship season. Sébastien Buemi and Anthony Davidson won the race driving the No. 8 Toyota TS040 Hybrid car.

== Qualifying ==
=== Qualifying result ===
Pole position winners in each class are marked in bold.

Pos	Class	Team	Average Time	Grid
1	**LMP1-H**	**No. 8 Toyota Racing**	**1:26.886**	1
2	LMP1-H	No. 20 Porsche Team	1:26.929	2
3	LMP1-H	No. 14 Porsche Team	1:27.306	3
4	LMP1-H	No. 7 Toyota Racing	1:27.437	4
5	LMP1-H	No. 2 Audi Sport Team Joest	1:28.118	5
6	LMP1-H	No. 1 Audi Sport Team Joest	1:28.165	6
7	**LMP1-L**	**No. 12 Rebellion Racing**	**1:31.751**	7
8	LMP1-L	No. 13 Rebellion Racing	1:32.245	8
9	**LMP2**	**No. 26 G-Drive Racing**	**1:33.062**	12
10	LMP2	No. 47 KCMG	1:33.847	9
11	LMP2	No. 27 SMP Racing	1:34.328	10
12	LMP2	No. 37 SMP Racing	1:35.006	11
13	LMP1-L	No. 9 Lotus	1:35.414	13
14	**LMGTE Pro**	**No. 99 Aston Martin Racing**	**1:39.686**	14
15	LMGTE Pro	No. 97 Aston Martin Racing	1:40.031	15
16	LMGTE Pro	No. 92 Porsche Team Manthey	1:40.145	16
17	LMGTE Pro	No. 71 AF Corse	1:40.171	17
18	LMGTE Pro	No. 51 AF Corse	1:40.200	18
19	**LMGTE Am**	**No. 98 Aston Martin Racing**	**1:40.230**	19
20	LMGTE Pro	No. 91 Porsche Team Manthey	1:40.283	20
21	LMGTE Am	No. 81 AF Corse	1:40.624	21
22	LMGTE Am	No. 95 Aston Martin Racing	1:40.638	22
23	LMGTE Am	No. 61 AF Corse	1:40.676	23
24	LMGTE Am	No. 75 Prospeed Competition	1:40.830	24
25	LMGTE Am	No. 88 Proton Competition	1:40.995	25
26	LMGTE Am	No. 90 8 Star Motorsports	1:41.019	26
–	LMP2	No. 35 OAK Racing	No Time	27

== Race ==
=== Race result ===
Class winners in bold.

Pos	Class	No	Team	Drivers	Chassis	Tyre	Laps
Pos	Class	No	Team	Drivers	Engine	Tyre	Laps
1	**LMP1-H**	**8**	**(Japan) Toyota Racing**	**(United Kingdom) Anthony Davidson (Switzerland) Sébastien Buemi**	**Toyota TS040 Hybrid**	MI	**236**
1	**LMP1-H**	**8**	**(Japan) Toyota Racing**	**(United Kingdom) Anthony Davidson (Switzerland) Sébastien Buemi**	**Toyota 3.7 L V8**	MI	**236**
2	LMP1-H	7	(Japan) Toyota Racing	(Austria) Alexander Wurz (France) Stéphane Sarrazin (Japan) Kazuki Nakajima	Toyota TS040 Hybrid	MI	236
2	LMP1-H	7	(Japan) Toyota Racing	(Austria) Alexander Wurz (France) Stéphane Sarrazin (Japan) Kazuki Nakajima	Toyota 3.7 L V8	MI	236
3	LMP1-H	20	(Germany) Porsche Team	(Germany) Timo Bernhard (New Zealand) Brendon Hartley (Australia) Mark Webber	Porsche 919 Hybrid	MI	235
3	LMP1-H	20	(Germany) Porsche Team	(Germany) Timo Bernhard (New Zealand) Brendon Hartley (Australia) Mark Webber	Porsche 2.0 L Turbo V4	MI	235
4	LMP1-H	14	(Germany) Porsche Team	(Germany) Marc Lieb (France) Romain Dumas (Switzerland) Neel Jani	Porsche 919 Hybrid	MI	234
4	LMP1-H	14	(Germany) Porsche Team	(Germany) Marc Lieb (France) Romain Dumas (Switzerland) Neel Jani	Porsche 2.0 L Turbo V4	MI	234
5	LMP1-H	1	(Germany) Audi Sport Team Joest	(Denmark) Tom Kristensen (France) Loïc Duval (Brazil) Lucas di Grassi	Audi R18 e-tron quattro	MI	234
5	LMP1-H	1	(Germany) Audi Sport Team Joest	(Denmark) Tom Kristensen (France) Loïc Duval (Brazil) Lucas di Grassi	Audi TDI 4.0 L Turbo V6 (Diesel)	MI	234
6	LMP1-H	2	(Germany) Audi Sport Team Joest	(Germany) André Lotterer (Switzerland) Marcel Fässler (France) Benoît Tréluyer	Audi R18 e-tron quattro	MI	233
6	LMP1-H	2	(Germany) Audi Sport Team Joest	(Germany) André Lotterer (Switzerland) Marcel Fässler (France) Benoît Tréluyer	Audi TDI 4.0 L Turbo V6 (Diesel)	MI	233
7	**LMP2**	**26**	**(Russia) G-Drive Racing**	**(Russia) Roman Rusinov (France) Olivier Pla (France) Julien Canal**	**Ligier JS P2**	D	**219**
7	**LMP2**	**26**	**(Russia) G-Drive Racing**	**(Russia) Roman Rusinov (France) Olivier Pla (France) Julien Canal**	**Nissan VK45DE 4.5 L V8**	D	**219**
8	LMP2	47	(Hong Kong) KCMG	(United Kingdom) Matthew Howson (United Kingdom) Richard Bradley (Switzerland) Alexandre Imperatori	Oreca 03R	D	219
8	LMP2	47	(Hong Kong) KCMG	(United Kingdom) Matthew Howson (United Kingdom) Richard Bradley (Switzerland) Alexandre Imperatori	Nissan VK45DE 4.5 L V8	D	219
9	LMP2	35	(France) OAK Racing	(Japan) Keiko Ihara (Colombia) Gustavo Yacamán (United Kingdom) Alex Brundle	Morgan LMP2	D	216
9	LMP2	35	(France) OAK Racing	(Japan) Keiko Ihara (Colombia) Gustavo Yacamán (United Kingdom) Alex Brundle	Judd HK 3.6 L V8	D	216
10	LMP2	27	(Russia) SMP Racing	(Russia) Sergey Zlobin (Italy) Maurizio Mediani (France) Nicolas Minassian	Oreca 03R	MI	215
10	LMP2	27	(Russia) SMP Racing	(Russia) Sergey Zlobin (Italy) Maurizio Mediani (France) Nicolas Minassian	Nissan VK45DE 4.5 L V8	MI	215
11	**LMP1-L**	**13**	**(Switzerland) Rebellion Racing**	**(Austria) Dominik Kraihamer (Italy) Andrea Belicchi (Switzerland) Fabio Leimer**	**Rebellion R-One**	MI	**215**
11	**LMP1-L**	**13**	**(Switzerland) Rebellion Racing**	**(Austria) Dominik Kraihamer (Italy) Andrea Belicchi (Switzerland) Fabio Leimer**	**Toyota RV8KLM 3.4 L V8**	MI	**215**
12	LMP2	37	(Russia) SMP Racing	(Russia) Kirill Ladygin (Russia) Anton Ladygin (Russia) Viktor Shaitar	Oreca 03R	MI	212
12	LMP2	37	(Russia) SMP Racing	(Russia) Kirill Ladygin (Russia) Anton Ladygin (Russia) Viktor Shaitar	Nissan VK45DE 4.5 L V8	MI	212
13	**LMGTE; Pro**	**51**	**(Italy) AF Corse**	**(Italy) Gianmaria Bruni (Finland) Toni Vilander**	**Ferrari 458 Italia GT2**	MI	**208**
13	**LMGTE; Pro**	**51**	**(Italy) AF Corse**	**(Italy) Gianmaria Bruni (Finland) Toni Vilander**	**Ferrari 4.5 L V8**	MI	**208**
14	LMGTE; Pro	71	(Italy) AF Corse	(Italy) Davide Rigon (United Kingdom) James Calado	Ferrari 458 Italia GT2	MI	208
14	LMGTE; Pro	71	(Italy) AF Corse	(Italy) Davide Rigon (United Kingdom) James Calado	Ferrari 4.5 L V8	MI	208
15	LMGTE; Pro	99	(United Kingdom) Aston Martin Racing	(Hong Kong) Darryl O'Young (United Kingdom) Alex MacDowall (Brazil) Fernando Rees	Aston Martin V8 Vantage GTE	MI	208
15	LMGTE; Pro	99	(United Kingdom) Aston Martin Racing	(Hong Kong) Darryl O'Young (United Kingdom) Alex MacDowall (Brazil) Fernando Rees	Aston Martin 4.5 L V8	MI	208
16	LMGTE; Pro	91	(Germany) Porsche Team Manthey	(Germany) Jörg Bergmeister (Austria) Richard Lietz	Porsche 911 RSR	MI	207
16	LMGTE; Pro	91	(Germany) Porsche Team Manthey	(Germany) Jörg Bergmeister (Austria) Richard Lietz	Porsche 4.0 L Flat-6	MI	207
17	**LMGTE; Am**	**95**	**(United Kingdom) Aston Martin Racing**	**(Denmark) David Heinemeier Hansson (Denmark) Kristian Poulsen (Denmark) Nicki Thiim**	**Aston Martin V8 Vantage GTE**	MI	**207**
17	**LMGTE; Am**	**95**	**(United Kingdom) Aston Martin Racing**	**(Denmark) David Heinemeier Hansson (Denmark) Kristian Poulsen (Denmark) Nicki Thiim**	**Aston Martin 4.5 L V8**	MI	**207**
18	LMGTE; Am	98	(United Kingdom) Aston Martin Racing	(Canada) Paul Dalla Lana (Portugal) Pedro Lamy (Denmark) Christoffer Nygaard	Aston Martin V8 Vantage GTE	MI	207
18	LMGTE; Am	98	(United Kingdom) Aston Martin Racing	(Canada) Paul Dalla Lana (Portugal) Pedro Lamy (Denmark) Christoffer Nygaard	Aston Martin 4.5 L V8	MI	207
19	LMGTE; Am	75	(Belgium) Prospeed Competition	(France) François Perrodo (France) Matthieu Vaxivière (France) Emmanuel Collard	Porsche 911 RSR	MI	204
19	LMGTE; Am	75	(Belgium) Prospeed Competition	(France) François Perrodo (France) Matthieu Vaxivière (France) Emmanuel Collard	Porsche 4.0 L Flat-6	MI	204
20	LMGTE; Am	88	(Germany) Proton Competition	(Germany) Christian Ried (Austria) Klaus Bachler (United Arab Emirates) Khaled Al Qubaisi	Porsche 911 RSR	MI	204
20	LMGTE; Am	88	(Germany) Proton Competition	(Germany) Christian Ried (Austria) Klaus Bachler (United Arab Emirates) Khaled Al Qubaisi	Porsche 4.0 L Flat-6	MI	204
21	LMGTE; Pro	97	(United Kingdom) Aston Martin Racing	(United Kingdom) Darren Turner (Germany) Stefan Mücke	Aston Martin V8 Vantage GTE	MI	204
21	LMGTE; Pro	97	(United Kingdom) Aston Martin Racing	(United Kingdom) Darren Turner (Germany) Stefan Mücke	Aston Martin 4.5 L V8	MI	204
22	LMGTE; Am	61	(Italy) AF Corse	(United States) Bret Curtis (United States) Mike Skeen (Netherlands) Jeroen Bleekemolen	Ferrari 458 Italia GT2	MI	203
22	LMGTE; Am	61	(Italy) AF Corse	(United States) Bret Curtis (United States) Mike Skeen (Netherlands) Jeroen Bleekemolen	Ferrari 4.5 L V8	MI	203
23	LMGTE; Pro	92	(Germany) Porsche Team Manthey	(France) Patrick Pilet (France) Frédéric Makowiecki	Porsche 911 RSR	MI	202
23	LMGTE; Pro	92	(Germany) Porsche Team Manthey	(France) Patrick Pilet (France) Frédéric Makowiecki	Porsche 4.0 L Flat-6	MI	202
24	LMP1-L	12	(Switzerland) Rebellion Racing	(France) Nicolas Prost (Germany) Nick Heidfeld (Switzerland) Mathias Beche	Rebellion R-One	MI	179
24	LMP1-L	12	(Switzerland) Rebellion Racing	(France) Nicolas Prost (Germany) Nick Heidfeld (Switzerland) Mathias Beche	Toyota RV8KLM 3.4 L V8	MI	179
DNF	LMP1-L	9	(Romania) Lotus	(France) Christophe Bouchut (United Kingdom) James Rossiter (Germany) Pierre Kaffer	CLM P1/01	MI	181
DNF	LMP1-L	9	(Romania) Lotus	(France) Christophe Bouchut (United Kingdom) James Rossiter (Germany) Pierre Kaffer	AER P60 Turbo V6	MI	181
DNF	LMGTE; Am	81	(Italy) AF Corse	(Australia) Stephen Wyatt (Italy) Michele Rugolo (Italy) Andrea Bertolini	Ferrari 458 Italia GT2	MI	169
DNF	LMGTE; Am	81	(Italy) AF Corse	(Australia) Stephen Wyatt (Italy) Michele Rugolo (Italy) Andrea Bertolini	Ferrari 4.5 L V8	MI	169
DNF	LMGTE; Am	90	(United States) 8 Star Motorsports	(United States) Jeff Segal (Italy) Paolo Ruberti (Italy) Gianluca Roda	Ferrari 458 Italia GT2	MI	64
DNF	LMGTE; Am	90	(United States) 8 Star Motorsports	(United States) Jeff Segal (Italy) Paolo Ruberti (Italy) Gianluca Roda	Ferrari 4.5 L V8	MI	64

FIA World Endurance Championship
Previous race: 6 Hours of Circuit of the Americas	2014 season	Next race: 6 Hours of Shanghai
