= 2014 FIA World Endurance Championship =

Auto racing series

- Organizer: Fédération Internationale de l'Automobile; Automobile Club de l'Ouest
- Discipline: Sports car endurance racing
- Races: 8

Champions
- LMP1 Manufacturer: (Japan) Toyota
- GTE Manufacturer: (Italy) Ferrari
- LMP1 Team: (Switzerland) Rebellion Racing
- LMP2 Team: (Russia) SMP Racing
- LMGTE Pro Team: (Italy) AF Corse
- LMGTE Am Team: (United Kingdom) Aston Martin Racing

FIA World Endurance Championship
- ← 2013 2015 →

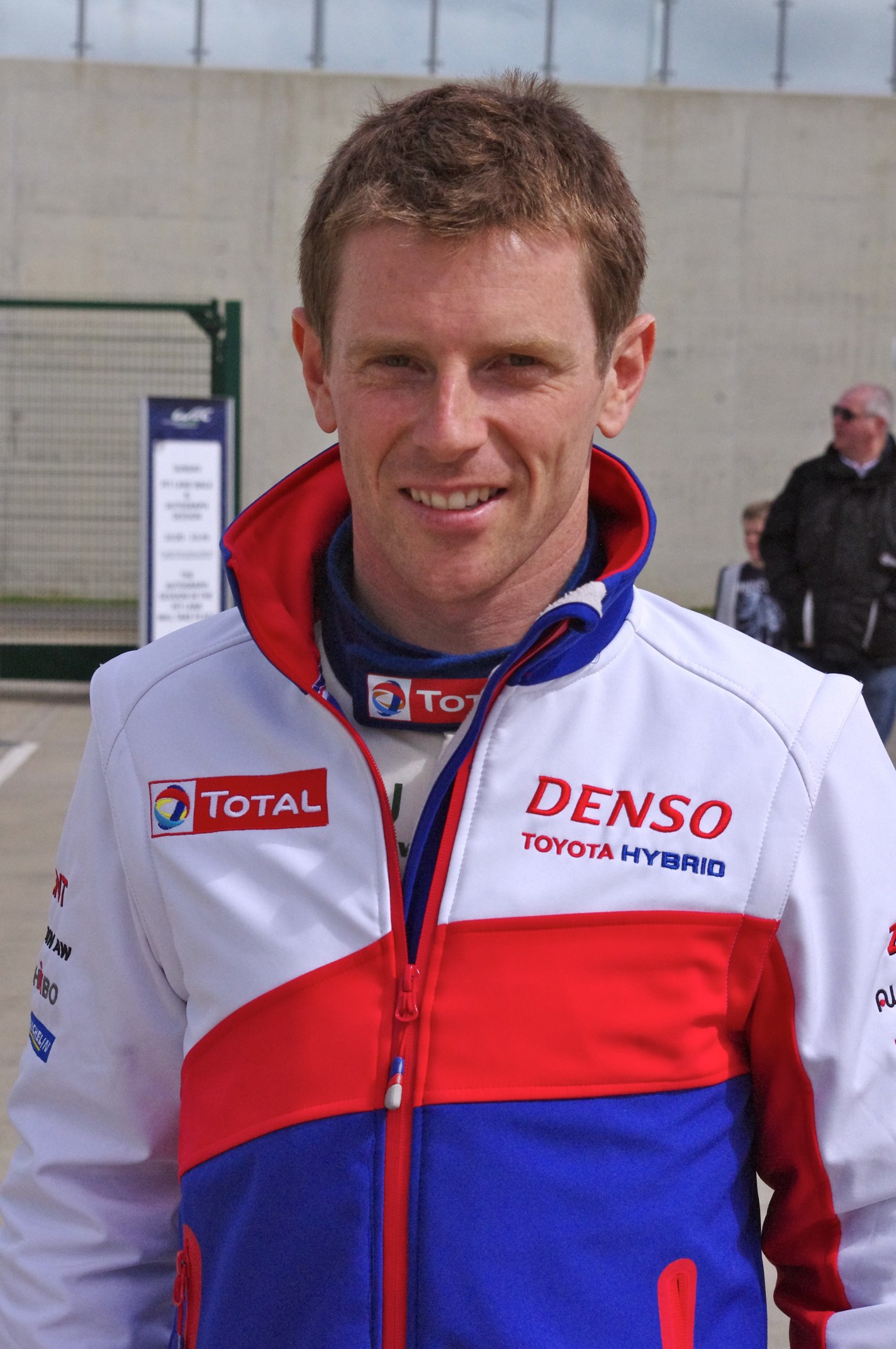
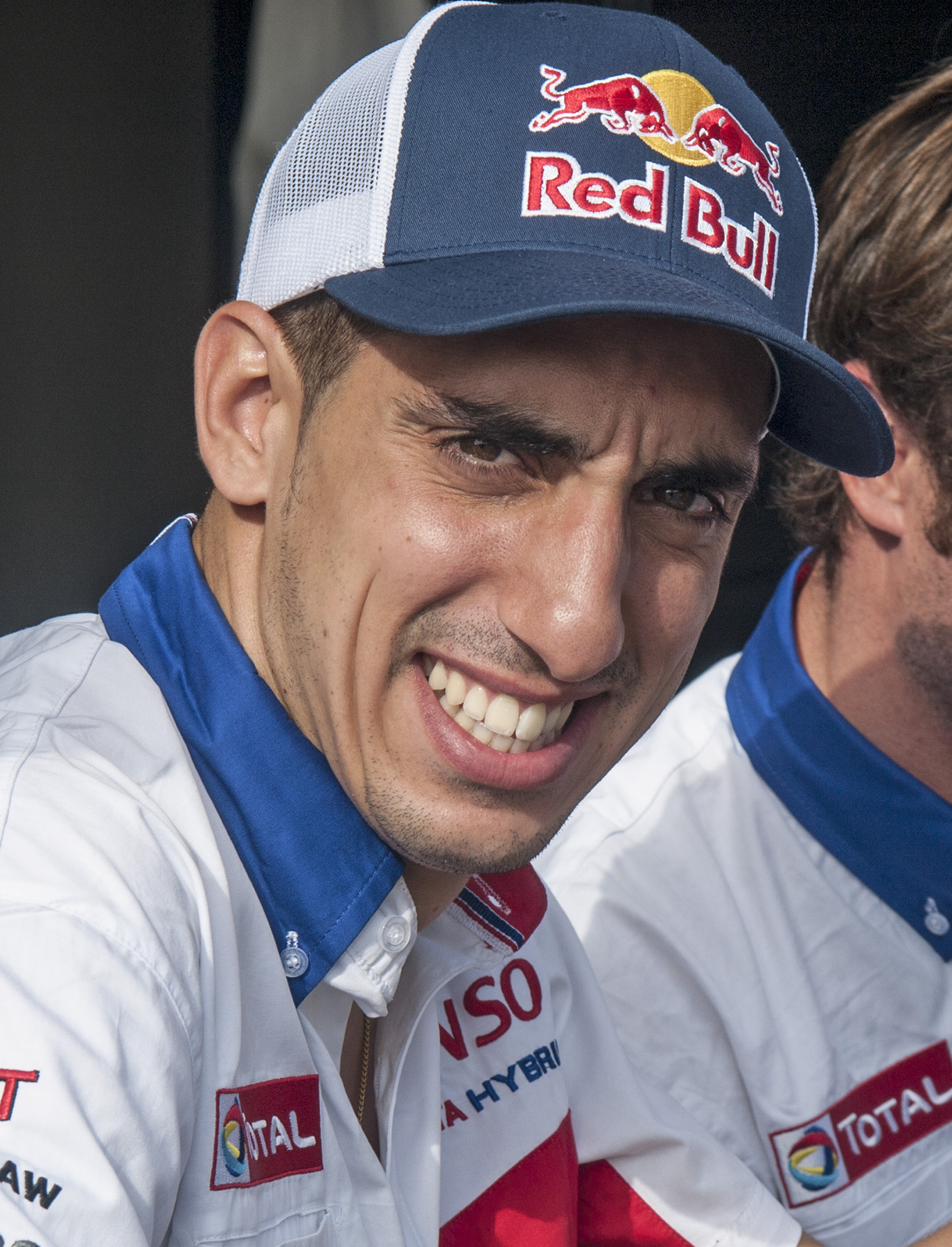
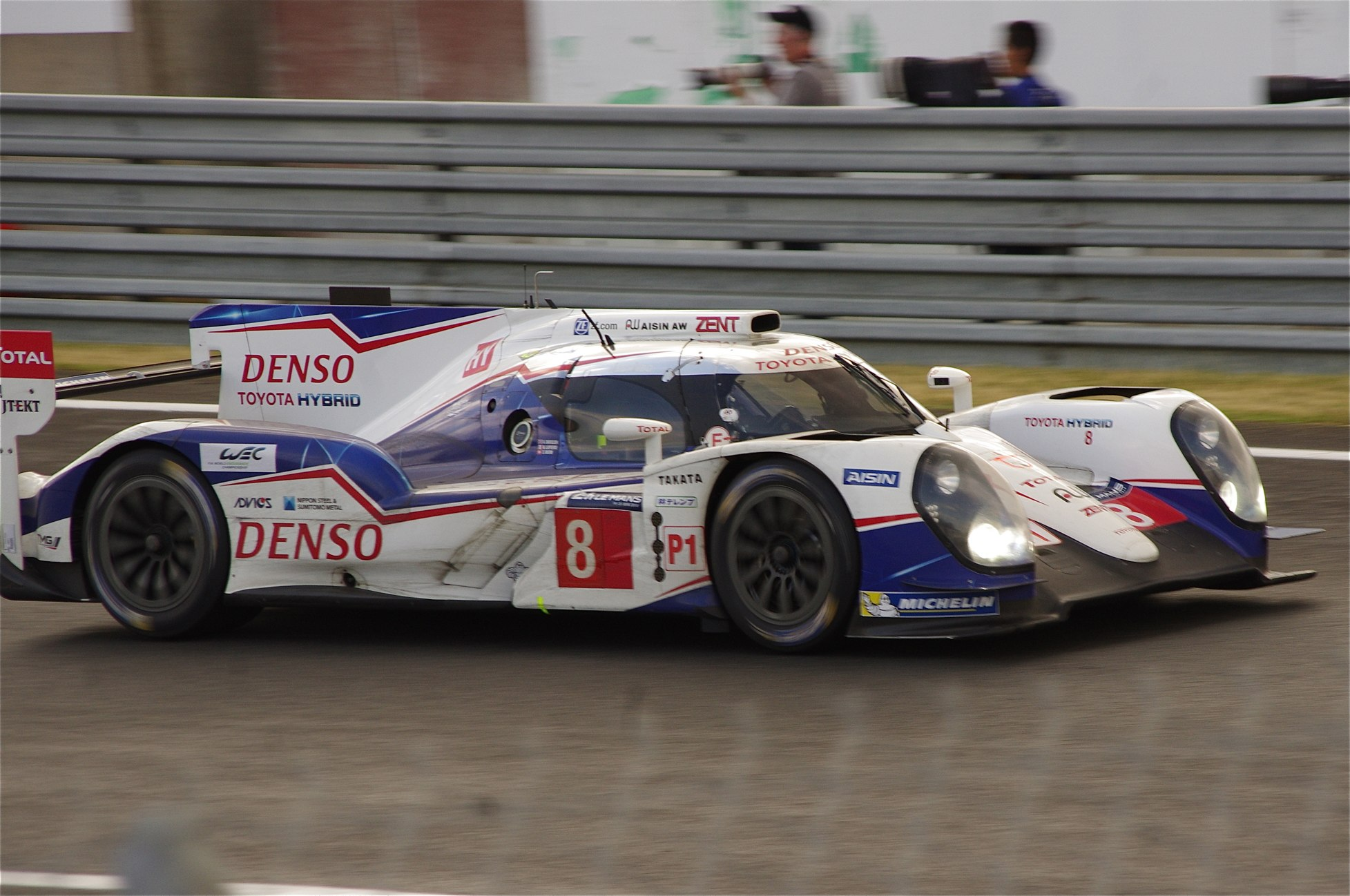
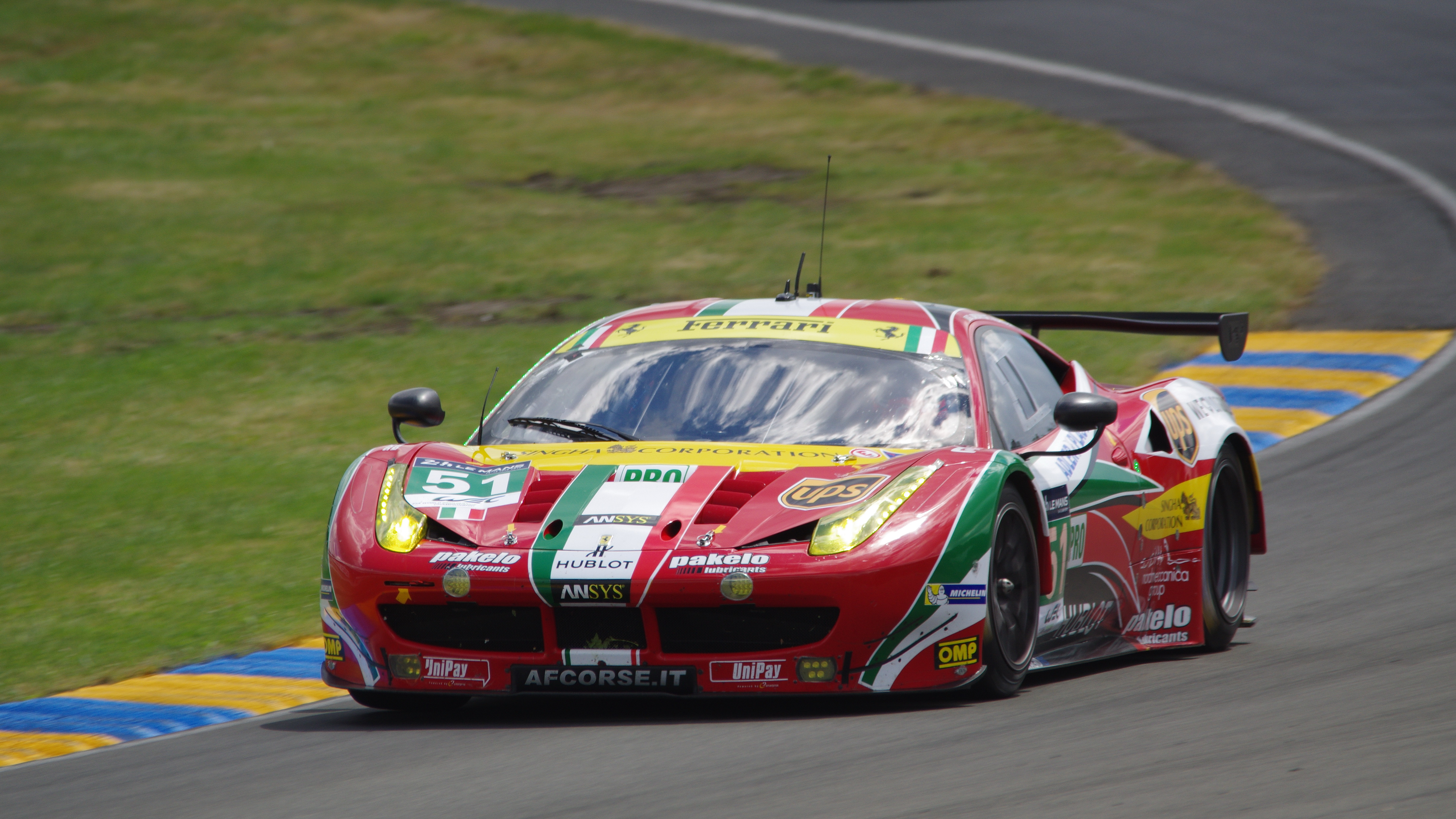
Anthony Davidson and Sébastien Buemi won the Drivers' Championship. Their team, Toyota, won the Manufacturers' Championship with the Toyota TS040 Hybrid. Ferrari won the World Endurance Cup for GT Manufacturers with their Ferrari 458 Italia GT2.

The 2014 FIA World Endurance Championship season was the third season of the FIA World Endurance Championship auto racing series, co-organized by the Fédération Internationale de l'Automobile (FIA) and the Automobile Club de l'Ouest (ACO). The series was open to Le Mans Prototypes and grand tourer-style racing cars from four ACO categories. World Championship titles were awarded for Le Mans Prototypes drivers and for LMP1 manufacturers, and several World Endurance Cups and Endurance Trophies were also awarded. The eight race series began in April at the Silverstone Circuit and concluded in November at the Autódromo José Carlos Pace.

The World Endurance Championship for Drivers was won by Toyota Racing pairing Anthony Davidson and Sébastien Buemi, as they won four of the season's eight races. Davidson and Buemi finished as champions by 39 points, ahead of Audi Sport Team Joest trio Marcel Fässler, André Lotterer and Benoît Tréluyer, who won successive races at Le Mans and the Circuit of the Americas. Ten points further behind in third place, was the Porsche Team's Romain Dumas, Neel Jani and Marc Lieb. With their victory in São Paulo, Dumas, Jani and Lieb gained the tie-break over Audi Sport Team Joest's Lucas di Grassi and Tom Kristensen. The season's other event was won by the sister Toyota team of Mike Conway, Stéphane Sarrazin and Alexander Wurz in Bahrain, while Nicolas Lapierre was a part of the winning team at Silverstone and Spa with Davidson and Buemi. With five wins, Toyota won the World Endurance Championship for Manufacturers, 45 points ahead of Audi. Rebellion Racing won the two privateer trophies on offer for the LMP1-L cars, winning all eight races; five wins for the No. 12 entry of Mathias Beche, Nick Heidfeld and Nicolas Prost, with three wins for the sister No. 13 entry of Andrea Belicchi, Dominik Kraihamer and Fabio Leimer.

Consistent finishing within the LMP2 class was enough to give the No. 27 entry from SMP Racing the FIA Endurance Trophy for the class, while Sergey Zlobin won the drivers' championship. Despite only winning at Le Mans – which awarded double points, where he was partnered with Anton Ladygin and Mika Salo – Zlobin, achieved six podium finishes with four different teammates and won the championship by nine points. G-Drive Racing, with drivers Julien Canal, Olivier Pla and Roman Rusinov won four races, but retirements at Le Mans and São Paulo ultimately denied them the titles. Similarly, seven points further in arrears, KCMG with drivers Richard Bradley and Matthew Howson won three races but also suffered two retirements at Le Mans and Shanghai. Tsugio Matsuda (Circuit of the Americas) and Alexandre Imperatori (Bahrain and São Paulo) were also part of winning KCMG teams, but did not contest the whole season.

In the GT element of the series, the World Endurance Cup was won by AF Corse and drivers Gianmaria Bruni and Toni Vilander. Bruni and Vilander took 4 victories during the season, and finished 33.5 points clear of the next best driver Frédéric Makowiecki, driving for Porsche Team Manthey. Makowiecki won twice during the season, winning with Marco Holzer and Richard Lietz at Silverstone, and with Patrick Pilet in Shanghai. Lietz and Pilet finished third and fourth in the standings respectively. The only other winners in the GT standings as a whole, was Aston Martin Racing at the Circuit of the Americas and São Paulo, with drivers Stefan Mücke and Darren Turner. In the Endurance Trophy for LMGTE Pro teams standings, AF Corse finished 20 points clear of Porsche Team Manthey. In the separate sub-classifications for the LMGTE amateur class, Aston Martin Racing won seven out of the eight races, to take a 1–2 in the teams' championship. In the drivers' championship, David Heinemeier Hansson and Kristian Poulsen won the title with four wins and four second places. They finished 34 points clear of the sister entry of Paul Dalla Lana, Pedro Lamy and Christoffer Nygaard, who won a trio of races. Third place went to Nicki Thiim, 20 points further adrift, who was a part of the Heinemeier Hansson-Poulsen entry at 5 events. The season's other winners were AF Corse at Spa, with drivers Marco Cioci, Luis Pérez Companc and Mirko Venturi.

== Calendar ==
A provisional calendar was published by the FIA World Endurance Championship on 20 September 2013. All eight races remained from the 2013 schedule, although with some dates changed. On 18 October, the calendar was revised to avoid some collisions with Formula One races. At the World Motor Sport Council meeting on 4 December 2013 the FIA confirmed the 2014 schedule. The round at Fuji Speedway took place on 12 October, avoiding a clash with the United SportsCar Petit Le Mans, and the provisional round at Interlagos was confirmed. The schedule was revised again on 31 January 2014, moving the São Paulo round to 30 November to avoid clashes with Formula One.

The rounds at the Circuit of the Americas and the Bahrain International Circuit both finished in night-time conditions.

Rnd	Race	Circuit	Location	Date
	Prologue	Circuit Paul Ricard	(France) Le Castellet, Var	28/29 March
1	6 Hours of Silverstone	Silverstone Circuit	(United Kingdom) Silverstone	20 April
2	WEC 6 Heures de Spa-Francorchamps	Circuit de Spa-Francorchamps	(Belgium) Stavelot	3 May
3	24 Heures du Mans	Circuit de la Sarthe	(France) Le Mans	14–15 June
4	6 Hours of Circuit of the Americas	Circuit of the Americas	(United States) Austin, Texas	20 September
5	6 Hours of Fuji	Fuji Speedway	(Japan) Oyama, Shizuoka	12 October
6	6 Hours of Shanghai	Shanghai International Circuit	(China) Shanghai	2 November
7	6 Hours of Bahrain	Bahrain International Circuit	(Bahrain) Sakhir	15 November
8	6 Hours of São Paulo	Autódromo José Carlos Pace	(Brazil) São Paulo	30 November

== Entries ==
The FIA unveiled an entry of 31 cars for the 2014 season of the World Endurance Championship, divided into five categories: Le Mans Prototype 1-Hybrid (LMP1-H), 1-Lightweight (LMP1-L), and 2 (LMP2), and Le Mans Grand Touring Endurance Professional (LMGTE Pro) and Amateur (LMGTE Am).

=== LMP1-H ===
LMP1-H became the unique category for the factory prototype teams in 2014 after the LMP1 category was split in two. Audi returned with a revised R18, led by the defending World Champion duo of Tom Kristensen and Loïc Duval, joined by Lucas di Grassi. 2012 World Champions Benoît Tréluyer, Marcel Fässler, and André Lotterer were in the sister Audi, while a third car also entered the Spa and Le Mans rounds. Toyota also returned with an all-new TS040 while retaining the same drivers from their past two seasons. Porsche expanded their World Endurance Championship effort beyond LMGTE with their all-new 919, bringing with them a collection of factory drivers, former Formula One driver Mark Webber, and newcomer to the championship Brendon Hartley.

Entrant/Team	Car	Engine	Tyre	No.	Drivers	Rounds
(Germany) Audi Sport Team Joest	Audi R18 e-tron quattro	Audi TDI 4.0 L Turbo V6 (Diesel)	M	1	(Denmark) Tom Kristensen	All
(Germany) Audi Sport Team Joest	Audi R18 e-tron quattro	Audi TDI 4.0 L Turbo V6 (Diesel)	M	1	(Brazil) Lucas di Grassi	All
(Germany) Audi Sport Team Joest	Audi R18 e-tron quattro	Audi TDI 4.0 L Turbo V6 (Diesel)	M	1	(France) Loïc Duval	1–2, 4–8
(Germany) Audi Sport Team Joest	Audi R18 e-tron quattro	Audi TDI 4.0 L Turbo V6 (Diesel)	M	1	(Spain) Marc Gené	3
(Germany) Audi Sport Team Joest	Audi R18 e-tron quattro	Audi TDI 4.0 L Turbo V6 (Diesel)	M	2	(Germany) André Lotterer	All
(Germany) Audi Sport Team Joest	Audi R18 e-tron quattro	Audi TDI 4.0 L Turbo V6 (Diesel)	M	2	(France) Benoît Tréluyer	All
(Germany) Audi Sport Team Joest	Audi R18 e-tron quattro	Audi TDI 4.0 L Turbo V6 (Diesel)	M	2	(Switzerland) Marcel Fässler	All
(Germany) Audi Sport Team Joest	Audi R18 e-tron quattro	Audi TDI 4.0 L Turbo V6 (Diesel)	M	3	(Italy) Marco Bonanomi	2–3
(Germany) Audi Sport Team Joest	Audi R18 e-tron quattro	Audi TDI 4.0 L Turbo V6 (Diesel)	M	3	(Portugal) Filipe Albuquerque	2–3
(Germany) Audi Sport Team Joest	Audi R18 e-tron quattro	Audi TDI 4.0 L Turbo V6 (Diesel)	M	3	(United Kingdom) Oliver Jarvis	3
(Japan) Toyota Racing	Toyota TS040 Hybrid	Toyota RV8KLM 3.7 L V8	M	7	(Austria) Alexander Wurz	All
(Japan) Toyota Racing	Toyota TS040 Hybrid	Toyota RV8KLM 3.7 L V8	M	7	(France) Stéphane Sarrazin	All
(Japan) Toyota Racing	Toyota TS040 Hybrid	Toyota RV8KLM 3.7 L V8	M	7	(Japan) Kazuki Nakajima	1–3, 5–6
(Japan) Toyota Racing	Toyota TS040 Hybrid	Toyota RV8KLM 3.7 L V8	M	7	(United Kingdom) Mike Conway	4, 7–8
(Japan) Toyota Racing	Toyota TS040 Hybrid	Toyota RV8KLM 3.7 L V8	M	8	(United Kingdom) Anthony Davidson	All
(Japan) Toyota Racing	Toyota TS040 Hybrid	Toyota RV8KLM 3.7 L V8	M	8	(Switzerland) Sébastien Buemi	All
(Japan) Toyota Racing	Toyota TS040 Hybrid	Toyota RV8KLM 3.7 L V8	M	8	(France) Nicolas Lapierre	1–4
(Germany) Porsche Team	Porsche 919 Hybrid	Porsche 9R9 2.0 L Turbo V4	M	14	(Germany) Marc Lieb	All
(Germany) Porsche Team	Porsche 919 Hybrid	Porsche 9R9 2.0 L Turbo V4	M	14	(France) Romain Dumas	All
(Germany) Porsche Team	Porsche 919 Hybrid	Porsche 9R9 2.0 L Turbo V4	M	14	(Switzerland) Neel Jani	All
(Germany) Porsche Team	Porsche 919 Hybrid	Porsche 9R9 2.0 L Turbo V4	M	20	(Germany) Timo Bernhard	All
(Germany) Porsche Team	Porsche 919 Hybrid	Porsche 9R9 2.0 L Turbo V4	M	20	(Australia) Mark Webber	All
(Germany) Porsche Team	Porsche 919 Hybrid	Porsche 9R9 2.0 L Turbo V4	M	20	(New Zealand) Brendon Hartley	All

Key
Full-season entry
* Eligible for all championship points
Additional entry
* Eligible only for Drivers' championship points
Third manufacturer entry
* Eligible for Drivers' championship points
* Only eligible for Manufacturers' championship points at Le Mans

=== LMP1-L ===
The new LMP1-L category, designed solely for privateers without hybrid systems in their cars, featured two-time winners of the FIA Endurance Trophy for Private LMP1 Teams, Rebellion Racing. The team developed two all-new Toyota-powered R-One chassis, but started the season with their familiar Lolas while they awaited the completion of the R-Ones. Fabio Leimer of Switzerland became the new rookie on the team, replacing Neel Jani, who was promoted to the Porsche factory team. The Kodewa-backed Lotus team moved up from the LMP2 category with their new CLM P1/01 with a new engine in the World Championship from British firm Advanced Engine Research (AER). However, Lotus missed the season's first three races as the car was not yet ready.

Entrant/Team	Car	Engine	Tyre	No.	Drivers	Rounds
(Romania) Lotus	CLM P1/01	AER P60 2.0 L Turbo V6	M	9	(United Kingdom) James Rossiter	4–5
(Romania) Lotus	CLM P1/01	AER P60 2.0 L Turbo V6	M	9	(France) Christophe Bouchut	4–5
(Romania) Lotus	CLM P1/01	AER P60 2.0 L Turbo V6	M	9	(Austria) Lucas Auer	4, 6, 8
(Romania) Lotus	CLM P1/01	AER P60 2.0 L Turbo V6	M	9	(Germany) Pierre Kaffer	5–8
(Romania) Lotus	CLM P1/01	AER P60 2.0 L Turbo V6	M	9	(Switzerland) Simon Trummer	7
(Romania) Lotus	CLM P1/01	AER P60 2.0 L Turbo V6	M	9	(France) Nathanaël Berthon	7
(Switzerland) Rebellion Racing	Lola B12/60; Rebellion R-One	Toyota RV8KLM 3.4 L V8	M	12	(France) Nicolas Prost	All
(Switzerland) Rebellion Racing	Lola B12/60; Rebellion R-One	Toyota RV8KLM 3.4 L V8	M	12	(Germany) Nick Heidfeld	All
(Switzerland) Rebellion Racing	Lola B12/60; Rebellion R-One	Toyota RV8KLM 3.4 L V8	M	12	(Switzerland) Mathias Beche	All
(Switzerland) Rebellion Racing	Lola B12/60; Rebellion R-One	Toyota RV8KLM 3.4 L V8	M	13	(Austria) Dominik Kraihamer	All
(Switzerland) Rebellion Racing	Lola B12/60; Rebellion R-One	Toyota RV8KLM 3.4 L V8	M	13	(Italy) Andrea Belicchi	All
(Switzerland) Rebellion Racing	Lola B12/60; Rebellion R-One	Toyota RV8KLM 3.4 L V8	M	13	(Switzerland) Fabio Leimer	All

=== LMP2 ===
The LMP2 class, nine strong in 2013, saw a significant reduction in its entrant list for 2014, with defending LMP2 champions OAK Racing downsizing their operation to a single Morgan entry, taking over the Russian G-Drive title that came with driver Roman Rusinov, before being replaced mid-season by OAK's newer Ligier JS P2 model. Russian outfit SMP Racing, in conjunction with AF Corse, shifted from the European Le Mans Series with their pair of Orecas, while Hong Kong-based team KCMG moved from the Asian Le Mans Series with a solo Oreca, after running invitational entries in the WEC in 2013. Greaves Motorsport returned to the European Le Mans Series for 2014 after two years in the WEC, while PeCom Racing's LMP2 effort was dissolved. Delta-ADR and Fabien Giroix, formerly of Gulf Racing Middle East, merged their teams under the Millennium Racing name, but the two-car entry withdrew from the series prior to the first round due to financial problems. Strakka Racing announced a switch from the LMP1 category to co-develop an LMP2 coupé with Japanese manufacturer Dome, the S103. However, Strakka's 2014 program was delayed and eventually cancelled after issues with developing the car evolved.

Entrant/Team	Car	Engine	Tyre	No.	Drivers	Rounds
(Russia) G-Drive Racing	Morgan LMP2; Ligier JS P2	Nissan VK45DE 4.5 L V8	D	26	(Russia) Roman Rusinov	All
(Russia) G-Drive Racing	Morgan LMP2; Ligier JS P2	Nissan VK45DE 4.5 L V8	D	26	(France) Olivier Pla	All
(Russia) G-Drive Racing	Morgan LMP2; Ligier JS P2	Nissan VK45DE 4.5 L V8	D	26	(France) Julien Canal	All
(Russia) SMP Racing	Oreca 03; Oreca 03R	Nissan VK45DE 4.5 L V8	M	27	(Russia) Sergey Zlobin	All
(Russia) SMP Racing	Oreca 03; Oreca 03R	Nissan VK45DE 4.5 L V8	M	27	(Italy) Maurizio Mediani	1–2, 4–8
(Russia) SMP Racing	Oreca 03; Oreca 03R	Nissan VK45DE 4.5 L V8	M	27	(France) Nicolas Minassian	1–2, 4–8
(Russia) SMP Racing	Oreca 03; Oreca 03R	Nissan VK45DE 4.5 L V8	M	27	(Russia) Anton Ladygin	3
(Russia) SMP Racing	Oreca 03; Oreca 03R	Nissan VK45DE 4.5 L V8	M	27	(Finland) Mika Salo	3
(Russia) SMP Racing	Oreca 03; Oreca 03R	Nissan VK45DE 4.5 L V8	M	37	(Russia) Kirill Ladygin	All
(Russia) SMP Racing	Oreca 03; Oreca 03R	Nissan VK45DE 4.5 L V8	M	37	(Russia) Viktor Shaytar	1–2, 4–8
(Russia) SMP Racing	Oreca 03; Oreca 03R	Nissan VK45DE 4.5 L V8	M	37	(Russia) Anton Ladygin	1–2, 4–8
(Russia) SMP Racing	Oreca 03; Oreca 03R	Nissan VK45DE 4.5 L V8	M	37	(Italy) Maurizio Mediani	3
(Russia) SMP Racing	Oreca 03; Oreca 03R	Nissan VK45DE 4.5 L V8	M	37	(France) Nicolas Minassian	3
(Hong Kong) KCMG	Oreca 03; Oreca 03R	Nissan VK45DE 4.5 L V8	D	47	(United Kingdom) Matthew Howson	All
(Hong Kong) KCMG	Oreca 03; Oreca 03R	Nissan VK45DE 4.5 L V8	D	47	(United Kingdom) Richard Bradley	All
(Hong Kong) KCMG	Oreca 03; Oreca 03R	Nissan VK45DE 4.5 L V8	D	47	(Japan) Tsugio Matsuda	1, 4
(Hong Kong) KCMG	Oreca 03; Oreca 03R	Nissan VK45DE 4.5 L V8	D	47	(Switzerland) Alexandre Imperatori	2–3, 5–8

=== LMGTE Pro ===
Much remained the same in the LMGTE Pro category, with Porsche, Aston Martin, and AF Corse Ferrari each with two full-season cars. Davide Rigon was promoted within AF Corse following the departures of Giancarlo Fisichella and Kamui Kobayashi, while Frédéric Makowiecki switched allegiances from Aston Martin to Porsche. Fernando Rees, LMGTE Am champion in 2012 with Larbre Compétition, was promoted to LMGTE Pro alongside Darryl O'Young and Alex MacDowall, with their World Touring Car Championship team Bamboo Engineering, associated with Aston Martin to lead one of the company's entries. British privateers Ram Racing moved to the World Endurance Championship after their 2013 European Le Mans Series LMGTE title led by Matt Griffin and Álvaro Parente in the first of the team's Ferraris. However, the team withdrew from the series after Le Mans.

Entrant/Team	Car	Engine	Tyre	No.	Drivers	Rounds
(Italy) AF Corse	Ferrari 458 Italia GT2	Ferrari F136 4.5 L V8	M	51	(Italy) Gianmaria Bruni	All
(Italy) AF Corse	Ferrari 458 Italia GT2	Ferrari F136 4.5 L V8	M	51	(Finland) Toni Vilander	All
(Italy) AF Corse	Ferrari 458 Italia GT2	Ferrari F136 4.5 L V8	M	51	(Italy) Giancarlo Fisichella	3
(Italy) AF Corse	Ferrari 458 Italia GT2	Ferrari F136 4.5 L V8	M	71	(Italy) Davide Rigon	All
(Italy) AF Corse	Ferrari 458 Italia GT2	Ferrari F136 4.5 L V8	M	71	(United Kingdom) James Calado	1–2, 4–8
(Italy) AF Corse	Ferrari 458 Italia GT2	Ferrari F136 4.5 L V8	M	71	(Monaco) Olivier Beretta	3
(Italy) AF Corse	Ferrari 458 Italia GT2	Ferrari F136 4.5 L V8	M	71	(Germany) Pierre Kaffer	3
(United Kingdom) Ram Racing	Ferrari 458 Italia GT2	Ferrari F136 4.5 L V8	M	52	(Republic of Ireland) Matt Griffin	1, 3
(United Kingdom) Ram Racing	Ferrari 458 Italia GT2	Ferrari F136 4.5 L V8	M	52	(Portugal) Álvaro Parente	1, 3
(United Kingdom) Ram Racing	Ferrari 458 Italia GT2	Ferrari F136 4.5 L V8	M	52	(Italy) Federico Leo	3
(Germany) Porsche Team Manthey	Porsche 911 RSR	Porsche M97/80 4.0 L Flat-6	M	91	(Germany) Jörg Bergmeister	All
(Germany) Porsche Team Manthey	Porsche 911 RSR	Porsche M97/80 4.0 L Flat-6	M	91	(France) Patrick Pilet	1–3
(Germany) Porsche Team Manthey	Porsche 911 RSR	Porsche M97/80 4.0 L Flat-6	M	91	(United Kingdom) Nick Tandy	1, 3–4
(Germany) Porsche Team Manthey	Porsche 911 RSR	Porsche M97/80 4.0 L Flat-6	M	91	(Austria) Richard Lietz	5–8
(Germany) Porsche Team Manthey	Porsche 911 RSR	Porsche M97/80 4.0 L Flat-6	M	92	(France) Frédéric Makowiecki	All
(Germany) Porsche Team Manthey	Porsche 911 RSR	Porsche M97/80 4.0 L Flat-6	M	92	(Germany) Marco Holzer	1–3
(Germany) Porsche Team Manthey	Porsche 911 RSR	Porsche M97/80 4.0 L Flat-6	M	92	(Austria) Richard Lietz	1, 3
(Germany) Porsche Team Manthey	Porsche 911 RSR	Porsche M97/80 4.0 L Flat-6	M	92	(France) Patrick Pilet	4–8
(United Kingdom) Aston Martin Racing	Aston Martin Vantage GTE	Aston Martin AM05 4.5 L V8	M	97	(United Kingdom) Darren Turner	All
(United Kingdom) Aston Martin Racing	Aston Martin Vantage GTE	Aston Martin AM05 4.5 L V8	M	97	(Germany) Stefan Mücke	All
(United Kingdom) Aston Martin Racing	Aston Martin Vantage GTE	Aston Martin AM05 4.5 L V8	M	97	(Brazil) Bruno Senna	2–3
(United Kingdom) Aston Martin Racing	Aston Martin Vantage GTE	Aston Martin AM05 4.5 L V8	M	99	(United Kingdom) Alex MacDowall	All
(United Kingdom) Aston Martin Racing	Aston Martin Vantage GTE	Aston Martin AM05 4.5 L V8	M	99	(Brazil) Fernando Rees	All
(United Kingdom) Aston Martin Racing	Aston Martin Vantage GTE	Aston Martin AM05 4.5 L V8	M	99	(Hong Kong) Darryl O'Young	1–6, 8
(United Kingdom) Aston Martin Racing	Aston Martin Vantage GTE	Aston Martin AM05 4.5 L V8	M	99	(Saudi Arabia) Abdulaziz Al Faisal	7

=== LMGTE Am ===
Defending LMGTE Am champions 8 Star returned with their Ferrari, picking up Proton Competition's Paolo Ruberti and Gianluca Roda to co-drive with team owner Enzo Potolicchio. They were joined in the Ferrari camp by AF Corse as well as Ram Racing's second Ferrari, which was also withdrawn after Le Mans. Proton Competition upgraded their Porsche to the 2013-specification 911 RSR, while series newcomers Prospeed Competition bolstered Porsche's efforts. Aston Martin also retained their dual amateur entries, with 2013 LMP2 championship runner-up David Heinemeier Hansson moving to the all Danish squad. Krohn Racing returned to the United States for the United SportsCar Championship, while IMSA Performance entered the European Le Mans Series. 2012 LMGTE Amateur Endurance Trophy winners Larbre Compétition switched to the European Le Mans Series, competing in LMP2; the team had the intention to take part in the WEC rounds following the 24 Hours of Le Mans, but later backed out of these plans.

Entrant/Team	Car	Engine	Tyre	No.	Drivers	Rounds
(United Kingdom) Ram Racing	Ferrari 458 Italia GT2	Ferrari F136 4.5 L V8	M	53	(United Kingdom) Johnny Mowlem	1, 3
(United Kingdom) Ram Racing	Ferrari 458 Italia GT2	Ferrari F136 4.5 L V8	M	53	(United Kingdom) Ben Collins	1
(United Kingdom) Ram Racing	Ferrari 458 Italia GT2	Ferrari F136 4.5 L V8	M	53	(United States) Mark Patterson	1, 3
(United Kingdom) Ram Racing	Ferrari 458 Italia GT2	Ferrari F136 4.5 L V8	M	53	(United Kingdom) Archie Hamilton	3
(Italy) AF Corse	Ferrari 458 Italia GT2	Ferrari F136 4.5 L V8	M	60	(United States) Peter Ashley Mann	2–3
(Italy) AF Corse	Ferrari 458 Italia GT2	Ferrari F136 4.5 L V8	M	60	(Italy) Raffaele Giammaria	2–3
(Italy) AF Corse	Ferrari 458 Italia GT2	Ferrari F136 4.5 L V8	M	60	(Italy) Lorenzo Casè	2–3
(Italy) AF Corse	Ferrari 458 Italia GT2	Ferrari F136 4.5 L V8	M	61	(Argentina) Luis Pérez Companc	1–4
(Italy) AF Corse	Ferrari 458 Italia GT2	Ferrari F136 4.5 L V8	M	61	(Italy) Marco Cioci	1–4
(Italy) AF Corse	Ferrari 458 Italia GT2	Ferrari F136 4.5 L V8	M	61	(Italy) Mirko Venturi	1–4
(Italy) AF Corse	Ferrari 458 Italia GT2	Ferrari F136 4.5 L V8	M	61	(United States) Bret Curtis	5
(Italy) AF Corse	Ferrari 458 Italia GT2	Ferrari F136 4.5 L V8	M	61	(United States) Mike Skeen	5
(Italy) AF Corse	Ferrari 458 Italia GT2	Ferrari F136 4.5 L V8	M	61	(Netherlands) Jeroen Bleekemolen	5
(Italy) AF Corse	Ferrari 458 Italia GT2	Ferrari F136 4.5 L V8	M	61	(Belarus) Alexander Talkanitsa Sr.	7
(Italy) AF Corse	Ferrari 458 Italia GT2	Ferrari F136 4.5 L V8	M	61	(United States) Jeff Segal	7–8
(Italy) AF Corse	Ferrari 458 Italia GT2	Ferrari F136 4.5 L V8	M	61	(Italy) Alessandro Pier Guidi	7–8
(Italy) AF Corse	Ferrari 458 Italia GT2	Ferrari F136 4.5 L V8	M	61	(Brazil) Emerson Fittipaldi	8
(Italy) AF Corse	Ferrari 458 Italia GT2	Ferrari F136 4.5 L V8	M	62	(France) Yannick Mallégol	3
(Italy) AF Corse	Ferrari 458 Italia GT2	Ferrari F136 4.5 L V8	M	62	(France) Jean-Marc Bachelier	3
(Italy) AF Corse	Ferrari 458 Italia GT2	Ferrari F136 4.5 L V8	M	62	(United States) Howard Blank	3
(Italy) AF Corse	Ferrari 458 Italia GT2	Ferrari F136 4.5 L V8	M	81	(Australia) Stephen Wyatt	1–5, 7–8
(Italy) AF Corse	Ferrari 458 Italia GT2	Ferrari F136 4.5 L V8	M	81	(Italy) Michele Rugolo	1–5, 7–8
(Italy) AF Corse	Ferrari 458 Italia GT2	Ferrari F136 4.5 L V8	M	81	(United Kingdom) Sam Bird	1, 3
(Italy) AF Corse	Ferrari 458 Italia GT2	Ferrari F136 4.5 L V8	M	81	(Italy) Andrea Bertolini	2, 4–5, 7–8
(Belgium) Prospeed Competition	Porsche 911 GT3 RSR; Porsche 911 RSR	Porsche M97/80 4.0 L Flat-6	M	75	(France) François Perrodo	All
(Belgium) Prospeed Competition	Porsche 911 GT3 RSR; Porsche 911 RSR	Porsche M97/80 4.0 L Flat-6	M	75	(France) Emmanuel Collard	All
(Belgium) Prospeed Competition	Porsche 911 GT3 RSR; Porsche 911 RSR	Porsche M97/80 4.0 L Flat-6	M	75	(France) Matthieu Vaxivière	1–2, 4–8
(Belgium) Prospeed Competition	Porsche 911 GT3 RSR; Porsche 911 RSR	Porsche M97/80 4.0 L Flat-6	M	75	(Finland) Markus Palttala	3
(Germany) Proton Competition	Porsche 911 RSR	Porsche M97/80 4.0 L Flat-6	M	88	(Germany) Christian Ried	All
(Germany) Proton Competition	Porsche 911 RSR	Porsche M97/80 4.0 L Flat-6	M	88	(United Arab Emirates) Khaled Al Qubaisi	All
(Germany) Proton Competition	Porsche 911 RSR	Porsche M97/80 4.0 L Flat-6	M	88	(Austria) Klaus Bachler	1–5, 7–8
(Germany) Proton Competition	Porsche 911 RSR	Porsche M97/80 4.0 L Flat-6	M	88	(Germany) Wolf Henzler	6
(United States) 8 Star Motorsports	Ferrari 458 Italia GT2	Ferrari F136 4.5 L V8	M	90	(Italy) Gianluca Roda	All
(United States) 8 Star Motorsports	Ferrari 458 Italia GT2	Ferrari F136 4.5 L V8	M	90	(Italy) Paolo Ruberti	All
(United States) 8 Star Motorsports	Ferrari 458 Italia GT2	Ferrari F136 4.5 L V8	M	90	(Venezuela) Enzo Potolicchio	1–2
(United States) 8 Star Motorsports	Ferrari 458 Italia GT2	Ferrari F136 4.5 L V8	M	90	(United States) Frankie Montecalvo	3
(United States) 8 Star Motorsports	Ferrari 458 Italia GT2	Ferrari F136 4.5 L V8	M	90	(United States) Jeff Segal	4–5
(United States) 8 Star Motorsports	Ferrari 458 Italia GT2	Ferrari F136 4.5 L V8	M	90	(Italy) Matteo Cressoni	6–8
(United Kingdom) Aston Martin Racing	Aston Martin Vantage GTE	Aston Martin AM05 4.5 L V8	M	95	(Denmark) David Heinemeier Hansson	All
(United Kingdom) Aston Martin Racing	Aston Martin Vantage GTE	Aston Martin AM05 4.5 L V8	M	95	(Denmark) Kristian Poulsen	All
(United Kingdom) Aston Martin Racing	Aston Martin Vantage GTE	Aston Martin AM05 4.5 L V8	M	95	(Denmark) Nicki Thiim	1, 3, 5, 7–8
(United Kingdom) Aston Martin Racing	Aston Martin Vantage GTE	Aston Martin AM05 4.5 L V8	M	95	(New Zealand) Richie Stanaway	2, 4, 6
(United Kingdom) Aston Martin Racing	Aston Martin Vantage GTE	Aston Martin AM05 4.5 L V8	M	98	(Canada) Paul Dalla Lana	All
(United Kingdom) Aston Martin Racing	Aston Martin Vantage GTE	Aston Martin AM05 4.5 L V8	M	98	(Portugal) Pedro Lamy	All
(United Kingdom) Aston Martin Racing	Aston Martin Vantage GTE	Aston Martin AM05 4.5 L V8	M	98	(Denmark) Christoffer Nygaard	All

== Results and standings ==
=== Race results ===
The highest finishing competitor entered in the World Endurance Championship is listed below. Invitational entries may have finished ahead of WEC competitors in individual races.

Rnd.	Circuit	LMP1-H Winners	LMP1-L Winners	LMP2 Winners	LMGTE Pro Winners	LMGTE Am Winners	Report
1	Silverstone	(Japan) No. 8 Toyota Racing	(Switzerland) No. 12 Rebellion Racing	(Russia) No. 26 G-Drive Racing	(Germany) No. 92 Porsche Team Manthey	(United Kingdom) No. 95 Aston Martin Racing	Results
1	Silverstone	(Switzerland) Sébastien Buemi (United Kingdom) Anthony Davidson (France) Nicolas Lapierre	(Switzerland) Mathias Beche (Germany) Nick Heidfeld (France) Nicolas Prost	(France) Julien Canal (France) Olivier Pla (Russia) Roman Rusinov	(Germany) Marco Holzer (Austria) Richard Lietz (France) Frédéric Makowiecki	(Denmark) David Heinemeier Hansson (Denmark) Kristian Poulsen (Denmark) Nicki Thiim	Results
2	Spa-Francorchamps	(Japan) No. 8 Toyota Racing	(Switzerland) No. 12 Rebellion Racing	(Russia) No. 26 G-Drive Racing	(Italy) No. 51 AF Corse	(Italy) No. 61 AF Corse	Results
2	Spa-Francorchamps	(Switzerland) Sébastien Buemi (United Kingdom) Anthony Davidson (France) Nicolas Lapierre	(Switzerland) Mathias Beche (Germany) Nick Heidfeld (France) Nicolas Prost	(France) Julien Canal (France) Olivier Pla (Russia) Roman Rusinov	(Italy) Gianmaria Bruni (Finland) Toni Vilander	(Argentina) Luis Pérez Companc (Italy) Marco Cioci (Italy) Mirko Venturi	Results
3	Le Mans	(Germany) No. 2 Audi Sport Team Joest	(Switzerland) No. 12 Rebellion Racing	(Russia) No. 27 SMP Racing (Note: The LMP2 class winner for Le Mans was the No. 38 Jota Sport invitational entry. As it was not a full-season WEC entrant, the points for the win were awarded to the No. 27 SMP Racing entry.)	(Italy) No. 51 AF Corse	(United Kingdom) No. 95 Aston Martin Racing	Results
3	Le Mans	(Switzerland) Marcel Fässler (Germany) André Lotterer (France) Benoît Tréluyer	(Switzerland) Mathias Beche (Germany) Nick Heidfeld (France) Nicolas Prost	(Russia) Sergey Zlobin (Russia) Anton Ladygin (Finland) Mika Salo	(Italy) Gianmaria Bruni (Italy) Giancarlo Fisichella (Finland) Toni Vilander	(Denmark) David Heinemeier Hansson (Denmark) Kristian Poulsen (Denmark) Nicki Thiim	Results
4	Austin	(Germany) No. 2 Audi Sport Team Joest	(Switzerland) No. 12 Rebellion Racing	(Hong Kong) No. 47 KCMG	(United Kingdom) No. 97 Aston Martin Racing	(United Kingdom) No. 98 Aston Martin Racing	Results
4	Austin	(Switzerland) Marcel Fässler (Germany) André Lotterer (France) Benoît Tréluyer	(Switzerland) Mathias Beche (Germany) Nick Heidfeld (France) Nicolas Prost	(United Kingdom) Matthew Howson (United Kingdom) Richard Bradley (Japan) Tsugio Matsuda	(United Kingdom) Darren Turner (Germany) Stefan Mücke	(Canada) Paul Dalla Lana (Portugal) Pedro Lamy (Denmark) Christoffer Nygaard	Results
5	Fuji	(Japan) No. 8 Toyota Racing	(Switzerland) No. 13 Rebellion Racing	(Russia) No. 26 G-Drive Racing	(Italy) No. 51 AF Corse	(United Kingdom) No. 95 Aston Martin Racing	Results
5	Fuji	(Switzerland) Sébastien Buemi (United Kingdom) Anthony Davidson	(Austria) Dominik Kraihamer (Italy) Andrea Belicchi (Switzerland) Fabio Leimer	(France) Julien Canal (France) Olivier Pla (Russia) Roman Rusinov	(Italy) Gianmaria Bruni (Finland) Toni Vilander	(Denmark) David Heinemeier Hansson (Denmark) Kristian Poulsen (Denmark) Nicki Thiim	Results
6	Shanghai	(Japan) No. 8 Toyota Racing	(Switzerland) No. 12 Rebellion Racing	(Russia) No. 26 G-Drive Racing	(Germany) No. 92 Porsche Team Manthey	(United Kingdom) No. 98 Aston Martin Racing	Results
6	Shanghai	(Switzerland) Sébastien Buemi (United Kingdom) Anthony Davidson	(Switzerland) Mathias Beche (Germany) Nick Heidfeld (France) Nicolas Prost	(France) Julien Canal (France) Olivier Pla (Russia) Roman Rusinov	(France) Patrick Pilet (France) Frédéric Makowiecki	(Canada) Paul Dalla Lana (Portugal) Pedro Lamy (Denmark) Christoffer Nygaard	Results
7	Bahrain	(Japan) No. 7 Toyota Racing	(Switzerland) No. 13 Rebellion Racing	(Hong Kong) No. 47 KCMG	(Italy) No. 51 AF Corse	(United Kingdom) No. 95 Aston Martin Racing	Results
7	Bahrain	(Austria) Alexander Wurz (France) Stéphane Sarrazin (United Kingdom) Mike Conway	(Austria) Dominik Kraihamer (Italy) Andrea Belicchi (Switzerland) Fabio Leimer	(United Kingdom) Matthew Howson (United Kingdom) Richard Bradley (Switzerland) Alexandre Imperatori	(Italy) Gianmaria Bruni (Finland) Toni Vilander	(Denmark) David Heinemeier Hansson (Denmark) Kristian Poulsen (Denmark) Nicki Thiim	Results
8	Interlagos	(Germany) No. 14 Porsche Team	(Switzerland) No. 13 Rebellion Racing	(Hong Kong) No. 47 KCMG	(United Kingdom) No. 97 Aston Martin Racing	(United Kingdom) No. 98 Aston Martin Racing	Results
8	Interlagos	(Germany) Marc Lieb (France) Romain Dumas (Switzerland) Neel Jani	(Austria) Dominik Kraihamer (Italy) Andrea Belicchi (Switzerland) Fabio Leimer	(United Kingdom) Matthew Howson (United Kingdom) Richard Bradley (Switzerland) Alexandre Imperatori	(United Kingdom) Darren Turner (Germany) Stefan Mücke	(Canada) Paul Dalla Lana (Portugal) Pedro Lamy (Denmark) Christoffer Nygaard	Results

Entries were required to complete the timed race as well as to complete 70% of the overall winning car's race distance in order to earn championship points. A single bonus point was awarded to the team and all drivers of the pole position car for each category in qualifying. For the 24 Hours of Le Mans, the race result points allocation was doubled. Furthermore, a race must complete three laps under green flag conditions in order for championship points to be awarded.

=== Drivers' Championships ===
Five titles were awarded to drivers in the 2014 season. A World Championship was reserved for LMP1 and LMP2 drivers. A World Cup was available for drivers in the LMGTE categories. Further, three FIA Endurance Trophies were also awarded to drivers in the LMP1-L, LMP2 and LMGTE Am categories.

Points systems
Duration	1st	2nd	3rd	4th	5th	6th	7th	8th	9th	10th	Other	Pole
6 Hours	25	18	15	12	10	8	6	4	2	1	0.5	1
24 Hours	50	36	30	24	20	16	12	8	4	2	1	1

==== World Endurance Drivers' Championship ====
Pos.	Driver	Team	SIL (United Kingdom)	SPA (Belgium)	LMS (France)	COA (United States)	FUJ (Japan)	SHA (China)	BHR (Bahrain)	SÃO (Brazil)	Total points
1	(United Kingdom) Anthony Davidson	(Japan) Toyota Racing	1	1	3	**3**	**1**	1	10	2	166
1	(Switzerland) Sébastien Buemi	(Japan) Toyota Racing	1	1	3	**3**	**1**	1	10	2	166
2	(Germany) André Lotterer	(Germany) Audi Sport Team Joest	Ret	5	1	1	6	4	4	5	127
2	(France) Benoît Tréluyer	(Germany) Audi Sport Team Joest	Ret	5	1	1	6	4	4	5	127
2	(Switzerland) Marcel Fässler	(Germany) Audi Sport Team Joest	Ret	5	1	1	6	4	4	5	127
3	(Germany) Marc Lieb	(Germany) Porsche Team	Ret	**4**	5	4	4	**3**	**2**	1	117
3	(France) Romain Dumas	(Germany) Porsche Team	Ret	**4**	5	4	4	**3**	**2**	1	117
3	(Switzerland) Neel Jani	(Germany) Porsche Team	Ret	**4**	5	4	4	**3**	**2**	1	117
4	(Brazil) Lucas di Grassi	(Germany) Audi Sport Team Joest	Ret	2	2	2	5	5	5	3	117
4	(Denmark) Tom Kristensen	(Germany) Audi Sport Team Joest	Ret	2	2	2	5	5	5	3	117
5	(Austria) Alexander Wurz	(Japan) Toyota Racing	**2**	3	**Ret**	6	2	2	1	4	116
5	(France) Stéphane Sarrazin	(Japan) Toyota Racing	**2**	3	**Ret**	6	2	2	1	4	116
6	(France) Nicolas Lapierre	(Japan) Toyota Racing	1	1	3	**3**					96
7	(France) Loïc Duval	(Germany) Audi Sport Team Joest	Ret	2	WD	2	5	5	5	3	81
8	(Japan) Kazuki Nakajima	(Japan) Toyota Racing	**2**	3	**Ret**		2	2			71
9	(Germany) Timo Bernhard	(Germany) Porsche Team	3	12	NC	5	3	6	3	**Ret**	64.5
9	(Australia) Mark Webber	(Germany) Porsche Team	3	12	NC	5	3	6	3	**Ret**	64.5
9	(New Zealand) Brendon Hartley	(Germany) Porsche Team	3	12	NC	5	3	6	3	**Ret**	64.5
10	(Switzerland) Mathias Beche	(Switzerland) Rebellion Racing	4	7	4	7	12	7	7	8	64.5
10	(France) Nicolas Prost	(Switzerland) Rebellion Racing	4	7	4	7	12	7	7	8	64.5
10	(Germany) Nick Heidfeld	(Switzerland) Rebellion Racing	4	7	4	7	12	7	7	8	64.5
11	(United Kingdom) Mike Conway	(Japan) Toyota Racing				6			1	4	45
12	(Spain) Marc Gené	(Germany) Audi Sport Team Joest			2						36
Pos.	Driver	Team	SIL (United Kingdom)	SPA (Belgium)	LMS (France)	COA (United States)	FUJ (Japan)	SHA (China)	BHR (Bahrain)	SÃO (Brazil)	Total points

Colour	Result
Gold	Winner
Silver	Second place
Bronze	Third place
Green	Points classification
Blue	Non-points classification
Blue	Non-classified finish (NC)
Purple	Retired, not classified (Ret)
Red	Did not qualify (DNQ)
Red	Did not pre-qualify (DNPQ)
Black	Disqualified (DSQ)
White	Did not start (DNS)
White	Withdrew (WD)
White	Race cancelled (C)
Blank	Did not practice (DNP)
Blank	Did not arrive (DNA)
Blank	Excluded (EX)

**Bold** - Pole position

==== World Endurance Cup for GT Drivers ====
Pos.	Driver	Team	SIL (United Kingdom)	SPA (Belgium)	LMS (France)	COA (United States)	FUJ (Japan)	SHA (China)	BHR (Bahrain)	SÃO (Brazil)	Total points
1	(Italy) Gianmaria Bruni	(Italy) AF Corse	**4**	**1**	**1**	**3**	1	Ret	1	4	168
1	(Finland) Toni Vilander	(Italy) AF Corse	**4**	**1**	**1**	**3**	1	Ret	1	4	168
2	(France) Frédéric Makowiecki	(Germany) Porsche Team Manthey	1	9	2	2	11	1	5	2	134.5
3	(Austria) Richard Lietz	(Germany) Porsche Team Manthey	1		2		4	2	4	6	111
4	(France) Patrick Pilet	(Germany) Porsche Team Manthey	2	2	11	2	11	1	5	2	108.5
5	(United Kingdom) Darren Turner	(United Kingdom) Aston Martin Racing	3	4	10	1	9	**Ret**	**2**	**1**	102
5	(Germany) Stefan Mücke	(United Kingdom) Aston Martin Racing	3	4	10	1	9	**Ret**	**2**	**1**	102
6	(Germany) Jörg Bergmeister	(Germany) Porsche Team Manthey	2	2	11	4	4	2	4	6	99
7	(Italy) Davide Rigon	(Italy) AF Corse	5	3	Ret	7	2	3	3	3	94
7	(United Kingdom) James Calado	(Italy) AF Corse	5	3	WD	7	2	3	3	3	94
8	(Denmark) Kristian Poulsen	(United Kingdom) Aston Martin Racing	8	7	3	6	5	6	6	8	78
8	(Denmark) David Heinemeier Hansson	(United Kingdom) Aston Martin Racing	8	7	3	6	5	6	6	8	78
9	(Germany) Marco Holzer	(Germany) Porsche Team Manthey	1	9	2						63
10	(Denmark) Nicki Thiim	(United Kingdom) Aston Martin Racing	8		3		5		6	8	56
11	(Denmark) Christoffer Nygaard	(United Kingdom) Aston Martin Racing	9	8	7	5	6	5	8	7	56
11	(Portugal) Pedro Lamy	(United Kingdom) Aston Martin Racing	9	8	7	5	6	5	8	7	56
11	(Canada) Paul Dalla Lana	(United Kingdom) Aston Martin Racing	9	8	7	5	6	5	8	7	56
12	(United Kingdom) Alex MacDowall	(United Kingdom) Aston Martin Racing	7	5	WD	10	**3**	4	12	5	55.5
12	(Brazil) Fernando Rees	(United Kingdom) Aston Martin Racing	7	5	WD	10	**3**	4	12	5	55.5
Pos.	Driver	Team	SIL (United Kingdom)	SPA (Belgium)	LMS (France)	COA (United States)	FUJ (Japan)	SHA (China)	BHR (Bahrain)	SÃO (Brazil)	Total points

==== LMP1 Private Teams Drivers' Trophy ====
Pos.	Driver	Team	SIL (United Kingdom)	SPA (Belgium)	LMS (France)	COA (United States)	FUJ (Japan)	SHA (China)	BHR (Bahrain)	SÃO (Brazil)	Total points
1	(Switzerland) Mathias Beche	(Switzerland) Rebellion Racing	1	1	1	1	2	1	2	2	204
1	(France) Nicolas Prost	(Switzerland) Rebellion Racing	1	1	1	1	2	1	2	2	204
1	(Germany) Nick Heidfeld	(Switzerland) Rebellion Racing	1	1	1	1	2	1	2	2	204
2	(Italy) Andrea Belicchi	(Switzerland) Rebellion Racing	Ret	Ret	Ret	Ret	1	2	1	1	93
2	(Austria) Dominik Kraihamer	(Switzerland) Rebellion Racing	Ret	Ret	Ret	Ret	1	2	1	1	93
2	(Switzerland) Fabio Leimer	(Switzerland) Rebellion Racing	Ret	Ret	Ret	Ret	1	2	1	1	93
3	(Austria) Lucas Auer	(Romania) Lotus				2		3		Ret	33
4	(France) Christophe Bouchut	(Romania) Lotus				2	Ret				18
4	(United Kingdom) James Rossiter	(Romania) Lotus				2	Ret				18
5	(Germany) Pierre Kaffer	(Romania) Lotus					Ret	3	Ret	Ret	15

==== FIA Endurance Trophy for LMP2 Drivers ====
Pos.	Driver	Team	SIL (United Kingdom)	SPA (Belgium)	LMS (France)	COA (United States)	FUJ (Japan)	SHA (China)	BHR (Bahrain)	SÃO (Brazil)	Total points
1	(Russia) Sergey Zlobin	(Russia) SMP Racing	3	4	1	2	3	2	Ret	2	146
2	(France) Olivier Pla	(Russia) G-Drive Racing	**1**	1	**Ret**	**3**	**1**	**1**	**3**	**Ret**	137
2	(France) Julien Canal	(Russia) G-Drive Racing	**1**	1	**Ret**	**3**	**1**	**1**	**3**	**Ret**	137
2	(Russia) Roman Rusinov	(Russia) G-Drive Racing	**1**	1	**Ret**	**3**	**1**	**1**	**3**	**Ret**	137
3	(United Kingdom) Matthew Howson	(Hong Kong) KCMG	2	**2**	Ret	1	2	Ret	1	1	130
3	(United Kingdom) Richard Bradley	(Hong Kong) KCMG	2	**2**	Ret	1	2	Ret	1	1	130
4	(Russia) Anton Ladygin	(Russia) SMP Racing	Ret	3	1	Ret	4	3	2	Ret	110
5	(France) Nicolas Minassian	(Russia) SMP Racing	3	4	Ret	2	3	2	Ret	2	96
5	(Italy) Maurizio Mediani	(Russia) SMP Racing	3	4	Ret	2	3	2	Ret	2	96
6	(Switzerland) Alexandre Imperatori	(Hong Kong) KCMG		**2**	Ret		2	Ret	1	1	87
7	(Russia) Kirill Ladygin	(Russia) SMP Racing	Ret	3	Ret	Ret	4	3	2	Ret	60
7	(Russia) Viktor Shaytar	(Russia) SMP Racing	Ret	3		Ret	4	3	2	Ret	60

==== FIA Endurance Trophy for LMGTE Am Drivers ====
Pos.	Driver	Team	SIL (United Kingdom)	SPA (Belgium)	LMS (France)	COA (United States)	FUJ (Japan)	SHA (China)	BHR (Bahrain)	SÃO (Brazil)	Total points
1	(Denmark) Kristian Poulsen	(United Kingdom) Aston Martin Racing	1	2	1	2	1	2	**1**	2	198
1	(Denmark) David Heinemeier Hansson	(United Kingdom) Aston Martin Racing	1	2	1	2	1	2	**1**	2	198
2	(Denmark) Christoffer Nygaard	(United Kingdom) Aston Martin Racing	2	3	5	1	**2**	**1**	3	**1**	164
2	(Portugal) Pedro Lamy	(United Kingdom) Aston Martin Racing	2	3	5	1	**2**	**1**	3	**1**	164
2	(Canada) Paul Dalla Lana	(United Kingdom) Aston Martin Racing	2	3	5	1	**2**	**1**	3	**1**	164
3	(Denmark) Nicki Thiim	(United Kingdom) Aston Martin Racing	1		1		1		**1**	2	144
4	(Germany) Christian Ried	(Germany) Proton Competition	4	4	2	3	4	5	4	4	121
4	(United Arab Emirates) Khaled Al Qubaisi	(Germany) Proton Competition	4	4	2	3	4	5	4	4	121
5	(Austria) Klaus Bachler	(Germany) Proton Competition	4	4	2	3	4		4	4	111
6	(Argentina) Luis Pérez Companc	(Italy) AF Corse	6	**1**	3	4					76
6	(Italy) Marco Cioci	(Italy) AF Corse	6	**1**	3	4					76
6	(Italy) Mirko Venturi	(Italy) AF Corse	6	**1**	3	4					76
7	(Australia) Stephen Wyatt	(Italy) AF Corse	**3**	5	**Ret**	6	Ret		2	3	68
7	(Italy) Michele Rugolo	(Italy) AF Corse	**3**	5	**Ret**	6	Ret		2	3	68

=== Manufacturers' Championships ===
Two manufacturers' championships were held in the FIA WEC, one for sports prototypes and one for grand tourers. The World Manufacturers' Championship was only open to manufacturer entries in the LMP1 category, while the World Cup for GT Manufacturers allowed entries from both LMGTE Pro and LMGTE Am to participate. Both titles allowed the top two finishing cars from each manufacturer to earn points toward their total.

==== World Endurance Manufacturers' Championship ====
Pos.	Manufacturer	SIL (United Kingdom)	SPA (Belgium)	LMS (France)	COA (United States)	FUJ (Japan)	SHA (China)	BHR (Bahrain)	SÃO (Brazil)	Total points
1	(Japan) Toyota	**1**	1	3	**3**	**1**	1	1	2	289
1	(Japan) Toyota	2	3	**Ret**	6	2	2	6	4	289
2	(Germany) Audi	Ret	2	1	1	5	4	4	3	244
2	(Germany) Audi	Ret	5	2	2	6	5	5	5	244
3	(Germany) Porsche	3	**4**	4	4	3	**3**	**2**	1	193
3	(Germany) Porsche	Ret	6	NC	5	4	6	3	**Ret**	193

==== World Endurance Cup for GT Manufacturers ====
Pos.	Manufacturer	SIL (United Kingdom)	SPA (Belgium)	LMS (France)	COA (United States)	FUJ (Japan)	SHA (China)	BHR (Bahrain)	SÃO (Brazil)	Total points
1	(Italy) Ferrari	**4**	**1**	**1**	**3**	1	3	1	3	288
1	(Italy) Ferrari	5	3	5	7	2	7	3	4	288
2	(Germany) Porsche	1	2	2	2	4	1	4	2	262
2	(Germany) Porsche	2	9	4	4	7	2	5	6	262
3	(United Kingdom) Aston Martin	3	4	3	1	**3**	**4**	**2**	**1**	232
3	(United Kingdom) Aston Martin	7	5	7	5	5	5	6	5	232

=== Teams championships ===
Teams in each of the FIA WEC categories, with the exception of LMP1-H, were eligible for their own FIA Endurance Trophies. Each entry, regardless of team, was scored separately.

==== FIA Endurance Trophy for Private LMP1 Teams ====
Pos.	Car	Team	SIL (United Kingdom)	SPA (Belgium)	LMS (France)	COA (United States)	FUJ (Japan)	SHA (China)	BHR (Bahrain)	SÃO (Brazil)	Total points
1	12	(Switzerland) Rebellion Racing	1	1	1	1	2	1	2	2	204
2	13	(Switzerland) Rebellion Racing	Ret	Ret	Ret	Ret	1	2	1	1	93
3	9	(Romania) Lotus				2	Ret	3	Ret	Ret	33

==== FIA Endurance Trophy for LMP2 Teams ====
Pos.	Car	Team	SIL (United Kingdom)	SPA (Belgium)	LMS (France)	COA (United States)	FUJ (Japan)	SHA (China)	BHR (Bahrain)	SÃO (Brazil)	Total points
1	27	(Russia) SMP Racing	3	4	1	2	3	2	Ret	2	146
2	26	(Russia) G-Drive Racing	**1**	1	**Ret**	**3**	**1**	**1**	**3**	**Ret**	137
3	47	(Hong Kong) KCMG	2	**2**	Ret	1	2	Ret	1	1	130
4	37	(Russia) SMP Racing	Ret	3	Ret	Ret	4	3	2	Ret	60

==== FIA Endurance Trophy for LMGTE Pro Teams ====
Pos.	Car	Team	SIL (United Kingdom)	SPA (Belgium)	LMS (France)	COA (United States)	FUJ (Japan)	SHA (China)	BHR (Bahrain)	SÃO (Brazil)	Total points
1	51	(Italy) AF Corse	**4**	**1**	**1**	**3**	1	Ret	1	4	168
2	92	(Germany) Porsche Team Manthey	1	6	2	2	6	1	5	2	148
3	97	(United Kingdom) Aston Martin Racing	3	4	3	1	5	**Ret**	**2**	**1**	138
4	91	(Germany) Porsche Team Manthey	2	2	4	4	4	2	4	6	122
5	71	(Italy) AF Corse	5	3	Ret	5	2	3	3	3	98
6	99	(United Kingdom) Aston Martin Racing	7	5	WD	6	**3**	4	6	5	70
7	52	(United Kingdom) Ram Racing	6		Ret						8

==== FIA Endurance Trophy for LMGTE Am Teams ====
Pos.	Car	Team	SIL (United Kingdom)	SPA (Belgium)	LMS (France)	COA (United States)	FUJ (Japan)	SHA (China)	BHR (Bahrain)	SÃO (Brazil)	Total points
1	95	(United Kingdom) Aston Martin Racing	1	2	1	2	1	2	**1**	2	198
2	98	(United Kingdom) Aston Martin Racing	2	3	5	1	**2**	**1**	3	**1**	164
3	88	(Germany) Proton Competition	4	4	2	3	4	5	4	4	121
4	61	(Italy) AF Corse	6	**1**	3	4	5		6	6	102
5	81	(Italy) AF Corse	**3**	5	**Ret**	6	Ret		2	3	68
6	90	(United States) 8 Star Motorsports	Ret	7	4	5	Ret	3	5	Ret	65
7	75	(Belgium) Prospeed Competition	Ret	6	Ret	**7**	3	4	7	5	58
8	53	(United Kingdom) Ram Racing	5		6						26
