= Fernando Rees =

Brazilian racing driver

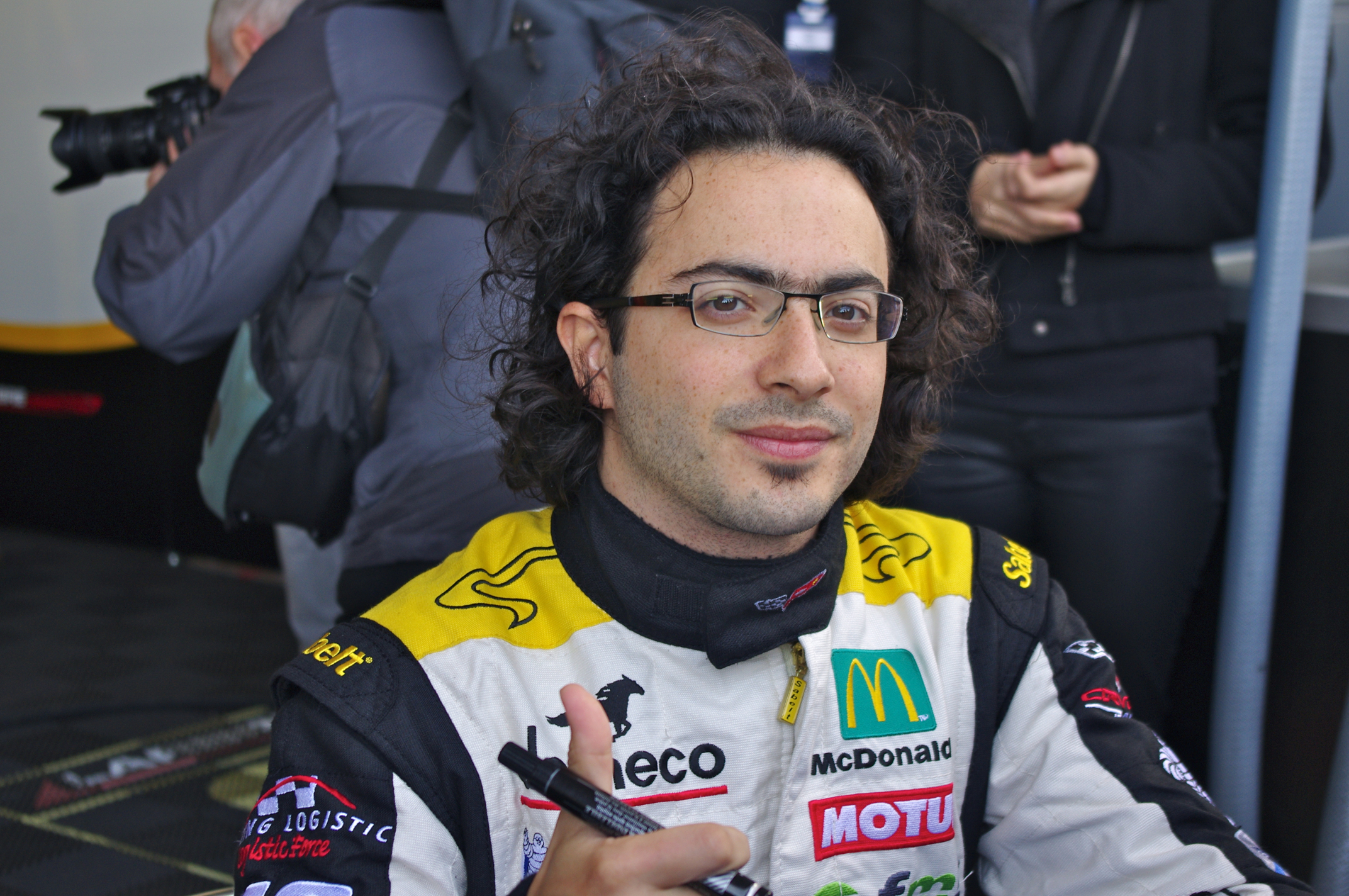
- Rees at the 2013 6 Hours of Silverstone
- Nationality: (Brazil) Brazilian
- Born: January 4, 1985 (age 41) São Paulo, São Paulo State (Brazil)

FIA World Endurance Championship career
- Debut season: 2012
- Current team: Aston Martin Racing
- Categorisation: FIA Silver (until 2014); FIA Gold (2015–)
- Car number: 97
- Starts: 28
- Wins: 1
- Podiums: 9
- Poles: 4
- Fastest laps: 1

Fernando Rees (born January 4, 1985) is a Brazilian former racecar driver. He started his career racing with go-karts back in 1993 at the age of eight. Rees made his international single-seaters' debut in 2001, his endurance racing debut in 2007, and has recently competed in various international racing championships.

== Career Information ==
=== Single-Seaters' Years (2001 - 2006) ===
Rees was born in São Paulo. In late 2003, he was given a private test by Mercedes-Benz on the Portuguese circuit of Estoril. On December 11, 2003, Mercedes-Benz had organized a Formula 3 test among its official client teams of the Formula 3 Euroseries. Only six drivers were selected to take part in the test: Fernando Rees, Robert Kubica, Jamie Green, Bruno Spengler, Alexandre Premat and Adrian Sutil. In the single test day, Rees topped the time sheets driving the ASM Mercedes-Benz car. Later in the same year, Ron Dennis picked the ASM Mercedes-Benz team for Lewis Hamilton to drive in the upcoming Formula 3 Euroseries championship, and Rees was forced to look elsewhere to compete.

After four years competing in the major single-seater categories in Europe (2001–2005), and having proved himself driving for the low budget team Interwetten.com in World Series by Renault during its 2005 season, Rees was awarded a test in the renowned Italian dream Draco Racing in the winter of that same year. With more than 30 drivers on track, including 2005 season champion Robert Kubica, Rees lead the field in the demanding track of Valencia, with more than half a second gap to Pastor Maldonado, who emerged second. The test opened new doors for Rees, and 2006 was a promising year.

But in early 2006, at the Italian circuit of Monza, Rees was unfortunately involved in a shunt during a Formula 3000 International Masters test day, under heavy rain, and was seriously injured. Rees had two broken vertebrae, three compressed vertebrae, a broken ankle, and other excoriations in both legs. As a consequence, Rees was away from motor racing for a period of 18 months - of which 12 months were spent under serious immobilization, and the remaining six months with continuous physiotherapy sessions.

=== Endurance Racing Years (2007 - 2015) ===
With his convalescence complete, Rees made his sportscar debut in the last Le Mans Series event of 2007, the Mil Milhas of Interlagos. Racing for Larbre Compétition with an Aston Martin DBR9, together with drivers Roland Bervillé, Gregor Fisken and Steve Zacchia, Rees took a clear win in the GT1 class after almost nine hours of racing. Rees decided to remain in the Le Mans Series for the following season.

Rees made his debut in the LMP2 class of the Le Mans Series in the second round of the 2008 championship, in Monza. In 2009, Rees signed once again with the Barazi-Epsilon team in the LMP2 class of the Le Mans Series. For this season, Barazi-Epsilon decided to run a two-drivers team, with Rees and Juan Barazi. But soon after the second race of the championship, in Spa-Francorchamps, the team announced its retirement from the 2009 Le Mans Series championship because of financial problems. Rees was left without a team to race for the remaining season of 2009.

In 2010, Rees returned to Larbre Compétition in the Le Mans Series, the same team with which he won the Interlagos round of the championship in 2007 - at that time, driving an Aston Martin DBR9. In 2010, after wins in the opening event at Paul Ricard, at the Algarve, and Hungaroring, and a fourth place in Spa-Francorchamps, Larbre Compétition secured the Team's Championship with its Saleen S7-R in the GT1 category. Rees went on to win his third race in the 2010 championship at Silverstone, in the closure of the season. Larbre Compétition also won the 2010 edition of the prestigious 24 Hours of Le Mans.

After a brief hiatus in 2011, Rees signed with Larbre Compétition for the FIA World Endurance Championship in 2012. Rees drove the team's No. 50 Corvette in the GT-Am category, replacing Pedro Lamy after the initial round of the championship at Sebring. Alongside his teammates Pedro Lamy, Julien Canal, and Patrick Bornhauser, Rees helped Larbre Compétition to win the world championship in the new FIA endurance series.

In 2013, Rees signed once more with Larbre Compétition for the second season of the FIA World Endurance Championship. Again, the team entered the No. 50 Chevrolet Corvette C6.R in the GT-Am category. Rees ended the season in seventh place.

== Racing Career Stats ==
- 2012: FIA World Endurance Championship (Team - Larbre Compétition)
  - 4 races, best start 2nd (Bahrain, Race 6); best race result 1st (Interlagos, Race 5)
- 2010: Le Mans Series (Team - Larbre Compétition)
  - 4 races, best start 1st (Hungaroring, Race 4; Silverstone, Race 5); best race result 1st (Algarve, Race 3; Hungaroring, Race 4; Silverstone, Race 5)
- 2009: Le Mans Series (Team - Barazi-Epsilon)
  - 1 race, best start 5th (Spa-Francorchamps, Race 2); best race result 4th (Spa-Francorchamps, Race 2)
- 2008: Le Mans Series (Team - Barazi-Epsilon)
  - 4 races, best start 2nd (Silverstone, Race 5); best race result 8th (Nurburgring, Race 4)
- 2007: Le Mans Series (Team - Larbre Compétition)
  - 1 race, best start 2nd (Interlagos, Race 6); best race result 1st (Interlagos, Race 6)
- 2006: Formula 3000 International Masters (Team - Pro Motorsport)
- 2005: World Series by Renault 3.5 (Team - Interwetten)
  - 12 races, best start 5th (Donington, Race 2); best race result 14th (Bilbao, Race 2)
- 2005: Formula Toyota Atlantic (Team - Brooks Associates Racing)
  - 1 race, best start 3rd (Long Beach, Race 1); best race result DNF (16th) (Long Beach, Race 1)
- 2004: Formula 3 Euroseries (Swiss Racing Team) - Formula 3 Euroseries tests with ASM Mercedes-Benz
  - 2 races with Swiss Racing Team
- 2003: F3 Sudamericana (Team Cesario Formula) - Formula 3 Euroseries tests with ASM Mercedes
  - 12 races, best start 3rd (Interlagos); best race result 1st (Interlagos)
  - Five third-place finishes, Sixth in Championship (did not compete in all the races)
- 2002: Formula Renault 2000 Eurocup (Team RC Motorsports) - Italian Formula Renault 2000 (Team RC Motorsports)
  - 9 races, best start 5th (Imola), best race result 12th (Pergusa)
- 2001: Italian Formula Renault 2000 (Team Bicar Racing)
  - 1 race, best start 7th (Misano), best race result 13th (Misano)

=== Complete Formula Renault 3.5 Series results ===
(key) (Races in bold indicate pole position) (Races in italics indicate fastest lap)

Year	Entrant	1	2	3	4	5	6	7	8	9	10	11	12	13	14	15	16	17	DC	Points
2005	Interwetten.com	ZOL; 1	ZOL; 2	MON; 1	VAL; 1	VAL; 2	LMS; 1; 17	LMS; 2 Ret	BIL; 1; 18	BIL; 2; 14	OSC; 1 Ret	OSC; 2 Ret	DON; 1; 23†	DON; 2 Ret	EST; 1 Ret	EST; 2; 19	MNZ; 1 Ret	MNZ; 2; 23†	35th	0

^{†} Driver did not finish the race, but was classified as he completed more than 90% of the race distance.

=== Complete FIA World Endurance Championship results ===
(key) (Races in bold indicate pole position; races in italics indicate fastest lap)

Year	Entrant	Class	Car	Engine	1	2	3	4	5	6	7	8	9	Rank	Points
2012	Larbre Compétition	LMGTE Am	Chevrolet Corvette C6.R	Chevrolet 5.5 L V8	SEB	SPA; 2	LMS	SIL; EX	SÃO; EX	BHR; 4	FUJ	SHA		82nd	1
2013	Larbre Compétition	LMGTE Am	Chevrolet Corvette C6.R	Chevrolet 5.5 L V8	SIL; 2	SPA; 3	LMS	SÃO; 6	COA; 6	FUJ; 8	SHA; 5	BHR; 4		7th	73
2014	Aston Martin Racing	LMGTE Pro	Aston Martin Vantage GTE	Aston Martin 4.5 L V8	SIL; 7	SPA; 5	LMS; WD	COA; 10	**FUJ**; 3	SHA; 4	BHR; 12	SÃO; 5		6th	55.5
2015	Aston Martin Racing V8	LMGTE Pro	Aston Martin Vantage GTE	Aston Martin 4.5 L V8	SIL; 6	**SPA**; 1	**LMS**; 9	NÜR; 5	**COA**; 4	FUJ; 7	SHA; 5	BHR; 7		7th	84
2016	Aston Martin Racing	LMGTE Pro	Aston Martin Vantage GTE	Aston Martin 4.5 L V8	SIL; Ret	SPA; 3	LMS; 3	NÜR	MEX	COA; 5	FUJ	SHA	BHR	12th	55

=== 24 Hours of Le Mans results ===
Year	Team	Co-Drivers	Car	Class	Laps	Pos.	Class Pos.
2015	(United Kingdom) Aston Martin Racing V8	(United Kingdom) Alex MacDowall (New Zealand) Richie Stanaway	Aston Martin Vantage GTE	GTE; Pro	320	34th	6th
2016	(United Kingdom) Aston Martin Racing	(United Kingdom) Jonathan Adam (New Zealand) Richie Stanaway	Aston Martin Vantage GTE	GTE; Pro	337	24th	6th
2017	(France) Larbre Compétition	(France) Romain Brandela (France) Christian Philippon	Chevrolet Corvette C7.R	GTE; Am	309	48th	15th

== Karting Career Stats ==
- 2001: Karting in Italian and European Championships (Birel Official Factory Team)
- 2000: Karting in Italian, European and World Championships (Danilo Rossi Racing Team)
- 1999: Karting in Italian and European Championships (Danilo Rossi Racing Team)
- 1998: Karting in Brazilian National Championships and North-American Championships (CRG Official Factory Team)
- 1997: Karting in Brazilian National Championships
- 1996: Karting in Brazilian National Championships
- 1995: Karting in Brazilian National Championships
- 1994: Karting in Brazilian National Championships
- 1993: Karting in Interlagos, São Paulo, Brazil
