= KC Motorgroup =

Auto racing team

(Hong Kong) KC Motorgroup
- Founded: 2007
- Team principal(s): Paul Ip
- Current series: Super Formula; GT World Challenge Asia; Super Taikyu; Kyojo Cup
- Former series: GT World Challenge Europe Endurance Cup; FIA World Touring Car Cup; FIA World Endurance Championship; IMSA SportsCar Championship; China Touring Car Championship; Asian Formula Three Championship; Super GT; Clio Cup China Series; Hong Kong Touring Car Championship; Asian Le Mans Series; All-Japan Formula Three Championship; NASCAR Xfinity Series (supported by Richard Childress Racing); Intercontinental GT Challenge
- Current drivers: (Norway) Dennis Olsen (United Kingdom) Nick Tandy (Belgium) Laurens Vanthoor (Switzerland) Alexandre Imperatori (France) Patrick Pilet (Japan) Kamui Kobayashi (Japan) Yuji Kunimoto (France) Pablo Sarrazin

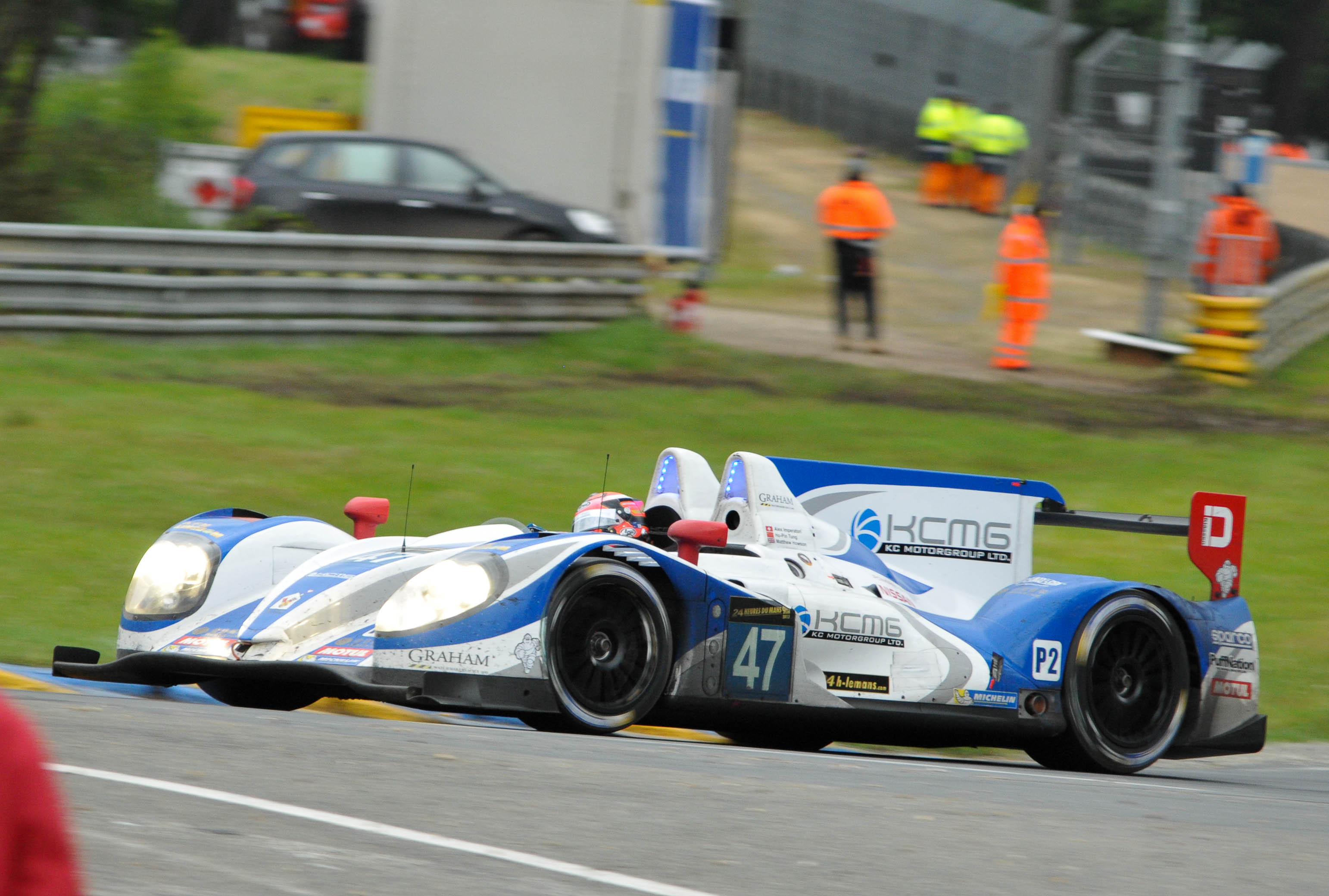
KCMG racing at Le Mans in 2013.

KC Motorgroup Ltd, known as KCMG, is an auto racing team based in Hong Kong. Founded by former racing driver Paul Ip in 2007, KCMG has participated in a variety of championships across the world in touring car, sports car, and open-wheel racing.

== History ==
KCMG entered the Formula Nippon series in 2010 as a Toyota customer team, with Katsuyuki Hiranaka finishing 12th. In 2011, Alexandre Imperatori finished 12th. In 2012, Ryo Orime finished 19th. In the 2013 Super Formula, Richard Bradley finished 21st. Yuichi Nakayama finished 20th in 2014, 16th in 2015, and 18th in 2016.

In 2013, KCMG expanded outside Asia with an entry in the 24 Hours of Le Mans before entering the FIA World Endurance Championship in 2014, during which the team won three races. The team went on to win the 2015 24 Hours of Le Mans in the LMP2 category on its way to a second-place finish in the 2015 WEC season. However, in the following year, KCMG pared down its LMP2 participation to a one-off entry at Le Mans. KCMG did contest the full 2016 WEC season, albeit in the GTE Am category, finishing fourth in what would be its final season in the championship.

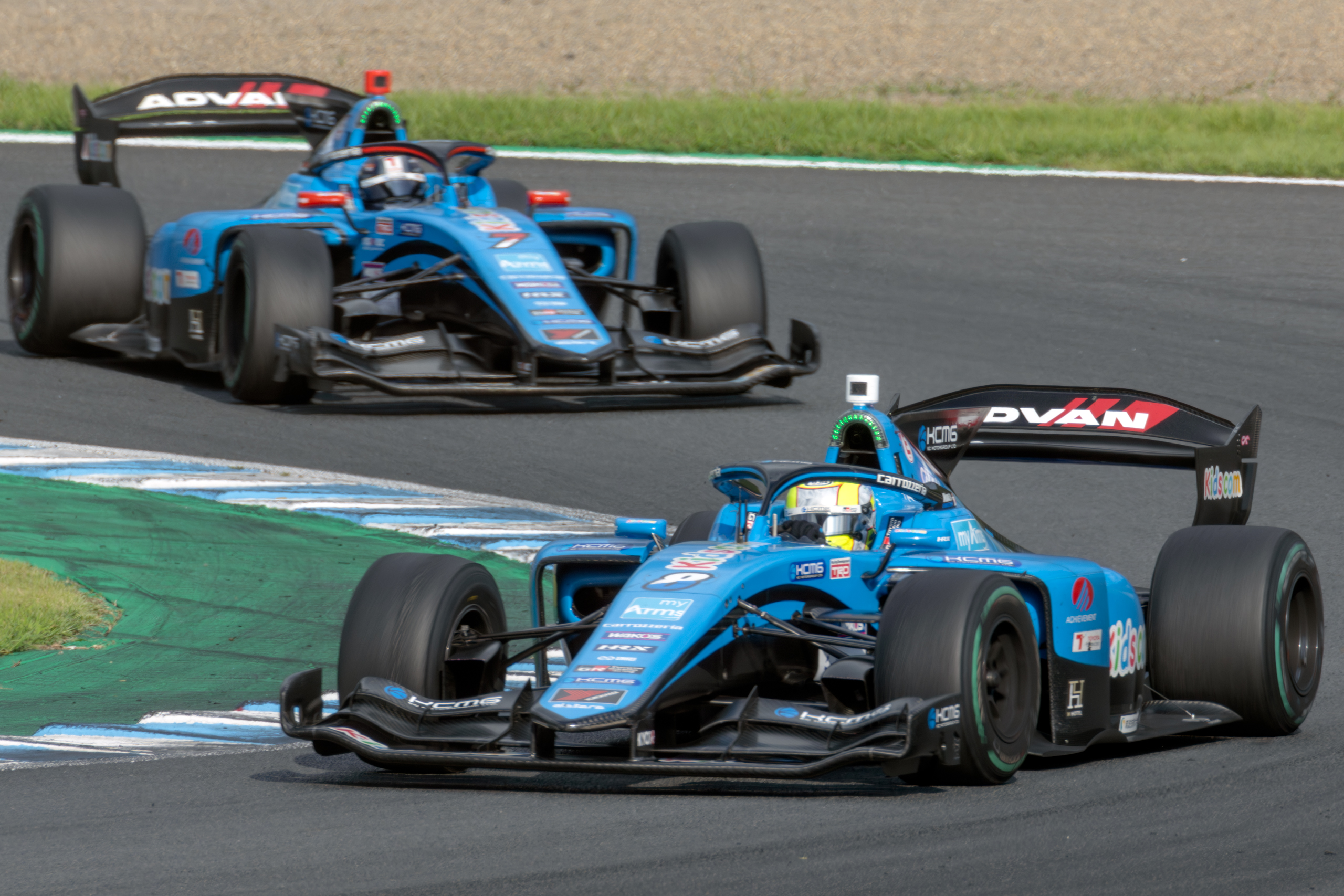
Nirei Fukuzumi and Kamui Kobayashi driving for KCMG in 2024.

Beginning in 2017, KCMG has partnered with Richard Childress Racing in the NASCAR Xfinity Series, sponsoring drivers Brandon Jones, Matt Tifft, Tyler Reddick and Earl Bamber. Reddick won the 2019 LTi Printing 250 with KCMG as the sponsor.

== KCMG Driver Development Project ==
In April 2021, KCMG announced the launch of a new young driver programme named the KCMG Driver Development Project with Irish racer Alex Dunne being named as its first signing the following day. The program provides its members with dedicated coaching staff on race weekends, and physiotherapists, managers and tutors to improve their fitness, media skills and education.

=== Current members ===
Driver	Years	Series
(France) Pablo Sarrazin	2022–	WRC2 Championship

=== Former members ===
Driver	Years	Series
(Republic of Ireland) Alex Dunne	2021	F4 Spanish Championship

== Drivers ==
- (Switzerland) Alexandre Imperatori (2011, 2013–2014, 2018–present)
- (United Kingdom) Matthew Howson (2013–2016)
- (China) Ho-Pin Tung (2013)
- (United Kingdom) Richard Bradley (2013–2016)
- (Japan) Tsugio Matsuda (2014–2016, 2018–present)
- (United Kingdom) Nick Tandy (2015)
- (France) Nicolas Lapierre (2015)
- (Germany) Christian Ried (2016)
- (Germany) Wolf Henzler (2016)
- (Switzerland) Joel Camathias (2016)
- (Japan) Yuichi Nakayama (2014–2016, 2018)
- (Japan) Katsuyuki Hiranaka (2010)
- (Japan) Ryo Orime (2012)
- (Japan) Kamui Kobayashi (2017–present)
- (Japan) Katsumasa Chiyo (2019–present)
- (United Kingdom) Oliver Jarvis (2018–present)
- (United States) Brandon Jones (2017)
- (United States) Matt Tifft (2018)
- (United States) Tyler Reddick (2019)
- (Australia) Josh Burdon (2018–present)
- (Hungary) Attila Tassi (2018–present)
- (Switzerland) Kris Richard (2018–present)
- (Portugal) Tiago Monteiro (2019–present)
- (New Zealand) Earl Bamber (2020)

== Racing record ==
=== 24 Hours of Le Mans results ===
Year	Entrant	No	Car	Drivers	Class	Laps	Pos.	Class Pos.
2013	(Hong Kong) KCMG	47	Morgan LMP2-Nissan	(United Kingdom) Matthew Howson (Switzerland) Alexandre Imperatori (China) Ho-Pin Tung	LMP2	241	DNF	DNF
2014	(Hong Kong) KCMG	47	Oreca 03R-Nissan	(United Kingdom) Richard Bradley (United Kingdom) Matthew Howson (Switzerland) Alexandre Imperatori	LMP2	87	DNF	DNF
2015	(Hong Kong) KCMG	47	Oreca 05-Nissan	(United Kingdom) Richard Bradley (United Kingdom) Matthew Howson (France) Nicolas Lapierre	LMP2	358	9th	**1st**
2016	(Hong Kong) KCMG	47	Oreca 05-Nissan	(United Kingdom) Richard Bradley (United Kingdom) Matthew Howson (Japan) Tsugio Matsuda	LMP2	116	DNF	DNF
2016	(Hong Kong) KCMG	78	Porsche 911 RSR	(Switzerland) Joël Camathias (Germany) Wolf Henzler (Germany) Christian Ried	GTE Am	300	41st	10th

=== FIA World Endurance Championship results ===
(key) (Races in bold indicate pole position; races in italics indicate fastest lap)

Year	Entrant	Class	No.	Chassis	Engine	Drivers	1	2	3	4	5	6	7	8	9	Pos.	Pts
2014	(Hong Kong) KCMG	LMP2	47	Oreca 03 Oreca 03R	Nissan VK45DE 4.5 L V8	(United Kingdom) Matthew Howson (United Kingdom) Richard Bradley (Japan) Tsugio Matsuda (Switzerland) Alexandre Imperatori	SIL; 2	**SPA**; 2	LMS; Ret	COA; 1	FUJ; 2	SHA; Ret	BHR; 1	SÃO; 1		**3rd**	**130**
2015	(Hong Kong) KCMG	LMP2	47	Oreca 05	Nissan VK45DE 4.5 L V8	(United Kingdom) Matthew Howson (United Kingdom) Richard Bradley (United Kingdom) Nick Tandy (France) Nicolas Lapierre	SIL; 4	SPA; 3	LMN; 1	NÜR; 1	COA; 2	FUJ; Ret	SHA; 3	BHR; 2		**2nd**	**155**
2016	(Hong Kong) KCMG	LMGTE Am	78	Porsche 911 RSR	Porsche M97/80 4.0 L Flat-6	(Germany) Christian Ried (Germany) Wolf Henzler (Switzerland) Joël Camathias	SIL; 4	SPA; 4	LMN; 5	NÜR; EX	MEX; 3	COA; 2	FUJ; 3	SHA; 3	BHR; 2	4th	125

=== Formula Nippon/Super Formula results ===
Year	Chassis	Engine	No.	Driver	1	2	3	4	5	6	7	8	9	10	T.C.	Points
2010	Swift 017.n	Toyota RV8K			SUZ	MOT	FUJ	MOT	SUG	AUT	SUZ				7th	4
2010	Swift 017.n	Toyota RV8K	18	(Japan) Katsuyuki Hiranaka	Ret	DNS	13	7	Ret	7	12	13			7th	4
2011	Swift 017.n	Toyota RV8K			SUZ	AUT	FUJ	MOT	SUZ	SUG	MOT				9th	2.5
2011	Swift 017.n	Toyota RV8K	18	(Switzerland) Alexandre Imperatori	10	7	Ret	11	C	12	8	12			9th	2.5
2012	Swift 017.n	Toyota RV8K			SUZ	MOT	AUT	FUJ	MOT	SUG	SUZ				12th	0
2012	Swift 017.n	Toyota RV8K	18	(Japan) Ryo Orime	17	15	Ret	Ret	Ret	Ret	18	15			12th	0
2013	Swift 017.n	Toyota RV8K			SUZ	AUT	FUJ	MOT	SUG	SUZ					11th	0
2013	Swift 017.n	Toyota RV8K	18	(United Kingdom) Richard Bradley	19	Ret	Ret	14	Ret	13	18				11th	0
2014	Dallara SF14	Toyota RI4A			SUZ	FUJ		FUJ	MOT	AUT	SUG	SUZ			10th	0
2014	Dallara SF14	Toyota RI4A	18	(Japan) Yuichi Nakayama	Ret	13	16	10	Ret	16	13	Ret	18		10th	0
2015	Dallara SF14	Toyota RI4A			SUZ	OKA	FUJ	MOT	AUT	SUG	SUZ				11th	1.5
2015	Dallara SF14	Toyota RI4A	18	(Japan) Yuichi Nakayama	13	Ret	15	16	19	10	Ret	6			11th	1.5
2016	Dallara SF14	Toyota RI4A			SUZ	OKA	FUJ	MOT	OKA		SUG	SUZ			11th	0
2016	Dallara SF14	Toyota RI4A	18	(Japan) Yuichi Nakayama	13	10	9	15	17	13	Ret	14	11		11th	0
2017	Dallara SF14	Toyota RI4A			SUZ	OKA		FUJ	MOT	AUT	SUG	SUZ			6th	16.5
2017	Dallara SF14	Toyota RI4A	18	(Japan) Kamui Kobayashi	9	4	5	15	2	7	7	C	C		6th	16.5
2018	Dallara SF14	Toyota RI4A			SUZ	AUT	SUG	FUJ	MOT	OKA	SUZ				9th	7
2018	Dallara SF14	Toyota RI4A	18	(Japan) Kamui Kobayashi	10	C	6	12		2	13				9th	7
2018	Dallara SF14	Toyota RI4A	18	(Japan) Yuichi Nakayama					13						9th	7
2019	Dallara SF19	Toyota RI4A			SUZ	AUT	SUG	FUJ	MOT	OKA	SUZ				9th	19
2019	Dallara SF19	Toyota RI4A	18	(Japan) Kamui Kobayashi	9	10	2	6	2	18	12				9th	19
2020	Dallara SF19	Toyota RI4A			SUG	MOT	OKA	SUZ		FUJ	AUT				8th	37
2020	Dallara SF19	Toyota RI4A	7	(Japan) Kamui Kobayashi	14		14		4	15	11				8th	37
2020	Dallara SF19	Toyota RI4A	7	(Japan) Yuichi Nakayama		11		18							8th	37
2020	Dallara SF19	Toyota RI4A	18	(Japan) Yuji Kunimoto	Ret	7	5	4	3	Ret	15				8th	37
2021	Dallara SF19	Toyota RI4A			FUJ	SUZ	AUT	SUG	MOT	MOT	SUZ				10th	4
2021	Dallara SF19	Toyota RI4A	7	(Japan) Kazuto Kotaka	15	16	16†	17	14		18				10th	4
2021	Dallara SF19	Toyota RI4A	7	(Japan) Kamui Kobayashi						10					10th	4
2021	Dallara SF19	Toyota RI4A	18	(Japan) Yuji Kunimoto	8	Ret	Ret	13	11	Ret	15				10th	4
2022	Dallara SF19	Toyota RI4A			FUJ		SUZ	AUT	SUG	FUJ	MOT		SUZ		10th	19
2022	Dallara SF19	Toyota RI4A	7	(Japan) Kamui Kobayashi	18	9	5	Ret	17	14	14	17	18	10	10th	19
2022	Dallara SF19	Toyota RI4A	18	(Japan) Yuji Kunimoto	13	15	6	11	9	8	15	12	20	18	10th	19
2023	Dallara SF23	Toyota RI4A			FUJ		SUZ	AUT	SUG	FUJ	MOT	SUZ			8th	24.5
2023	Dallara SF23	Toyota RI4A	7	(Japan) Kamui Kobayashi	Ret	6	14	11	6	9	7	8	17		8th	24.5
2023	Dallara SF23	Toyota RI4A	18	(Japan) Yuji Kunimoto	12	16	16	10	9	15	10	16	8		8th	24.5
2024	Dallara SF23	Toyota TRD-01F			SUZ	AUT	SUG	FUJ	MOT	FUJ		SUZ			4th	77.5
2024	Dallara SF23	Toyota TRD-01F	7	(Japan) Kamui Kobayashi	19†	10	10	8	12	3	5	14	10		4th	77.5
2024	Dallara SF23	Toyota TRD-01F	8	(Japan) Nirei Fukuzumi	6	8	13	**4**	9	**5**	2	6	3		4th	77.5

Notes

- * – Season still in progress.
