= Alexandre Imperatori =

Swiss racing driver (born 1987)

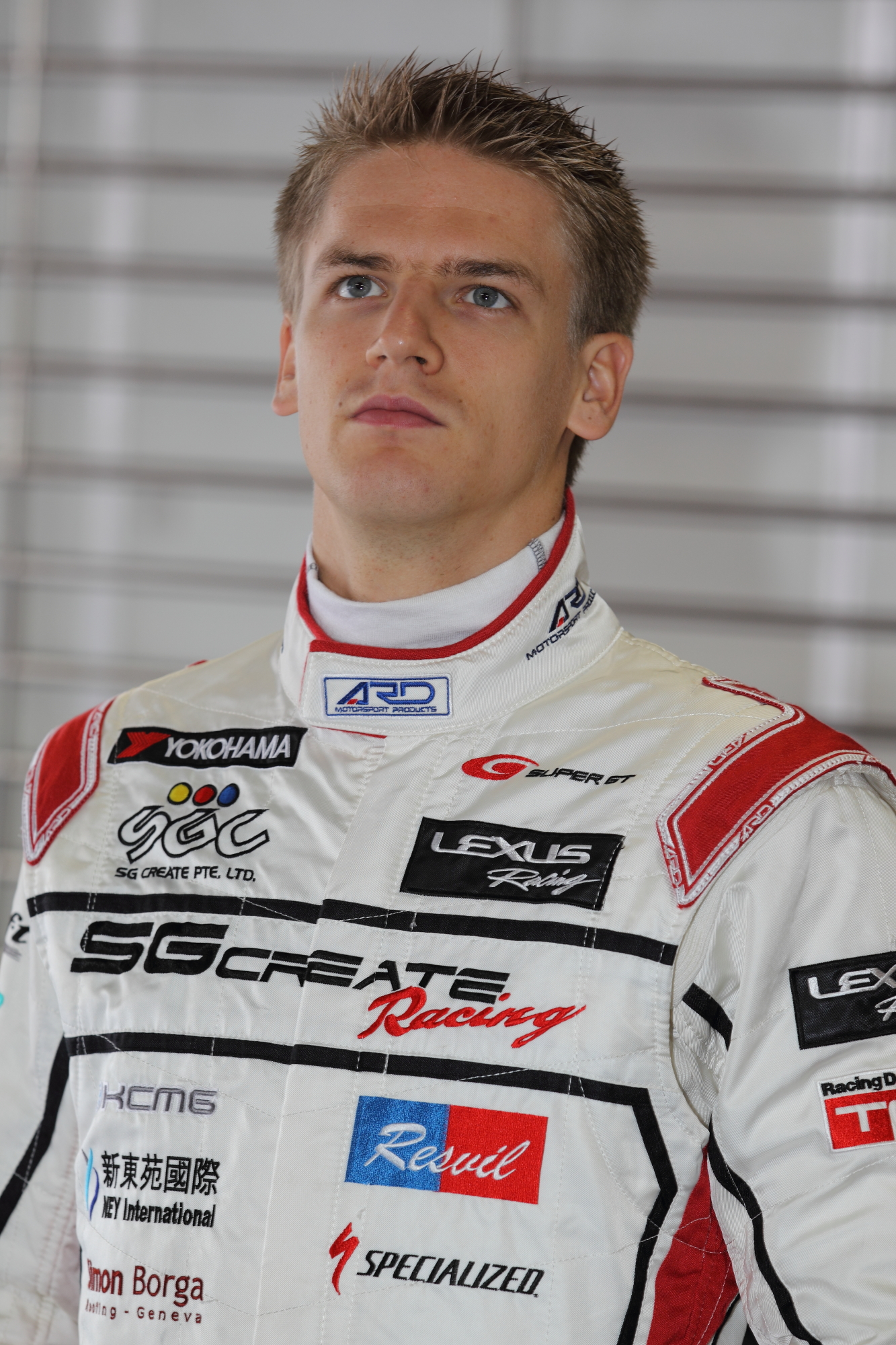
- Imperatori at Fuji Speedway in 2012
- Nationality: (Switzerland) Swiss
- Born: Alexandre Emmanuel Imperatori; 19 April 1987 (age 39) Châtel-Saint-Denis, Switzerland

Porsche Carrera Cup Asia career
- Debut season: 2011
- Current team: PICC Team Starchase
- Categorisation: FIA Gold (until 2026); FIA Silver (2027–)
- Car number: 99
- Starts: 19
- Wins: 14
- Poles: 5
- Fastest laps: 10
- Best finish: 1 in 2012

Previous series
- 2012, 2011 2011 2007–08, 2008–09 2010, 2009, 2008 2007, 2006: Super GT; Formula Nippon; A1 Grand Prix; All-Japan Formula Three Championship; Asian Formula Renault Challenge

Championship titles
- 2012 2006 2000: Porsche Carrera Cup Asia; China Formula Renault Challenge; French Junior Karting Championship

Alexandre Emmanuel Imperatori (born 19 April 1987 in Châtel-Saint-Denis) is a Swiss racing driver who lives in Shanghai, China.

== Career ==
=== Karting ===
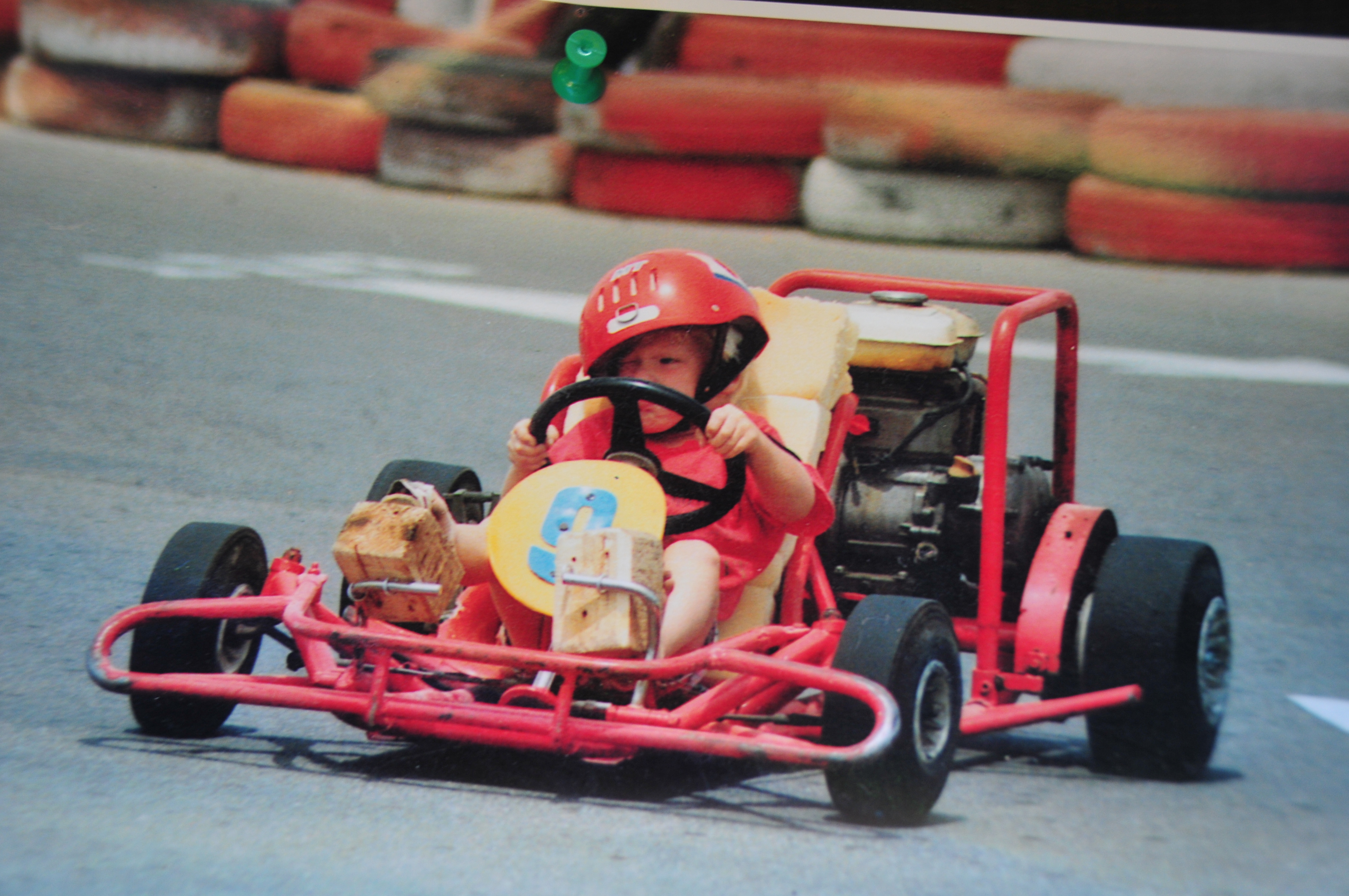
Alexandre Imperatori go-karting at the age of 4

Imperatori started kart racing at the age of four in Spain. He raced karting in Spain and Germany and France until 2002. He was the France Junior Champion in 2000 and also competed in the European Championship in 2000, 2001 and 2002.

=== Formula Racing ===
In 2003, Imperatori moved to single seater by reaching the final of the Mygale scholarship program. From 2004 to 2007, he competed in the 2006 and 2007 Asian Formula Renault Challenge and came 1st runner-up. He was also the 2006 China Formula Renault Challenge Champion, which earned him a test from Renault Sport in the World Series by Renault.

From December 2007, Imperatori joined the Swiss team in the A1 Grand Prix as rookie driver and together with the team won the 2007-2008 championship and came second in the 2008-2009 season.

From 2008 to 2010, Imperatori was competing in the All-Japan Formula Three Championship. In 2008, he came second in the National Class before achieving third rank in 2009. In 2010, he stepped up to the Championship class with TODA Racing and using the single HONDA power unit of the grid, came fifth in the championship. In 2010, Imperatori finished his season with a good performance in the Macau Grand Prix by coming 12th after starting 26th on the grid due to a brake failure in the qualification race.

In 2011, Imperatori stepped up to Formula Nippon, the highest level of single-seater racing in Japan.

=== GT Racing ===
In 2011, Imperatori also started becoming involved in GT racing. He replaced Christian Menzel at Team Starchase in Porsche Carrera Cup Asia and had a successful season by winning eight of the ten races he entered. He finished third in the championship after missing the two races in Singapore due to conflicting racing commitments.

Besides, the Porsche Carrera Cup Asia and Formula Nippon, Imperatori was also competing in the GT300 class of Super GT in 2011 with the Lexus IS350 GT300 of SG Changi Racing. Together with teammate Orime, he won at Sugo and climbed on the podium two more times at Fuji and Autopolis.

Imperatori finished the 2011 season with a win in the GTC category at the ILMC 6 Hours of Zhuhai for Audi Sport C Racing China.

Imperatori won the 2012 Porsche Carrera Cup Asia Championship.

From 2014 to 2021, Imperatori completed Nürburgring 24 Hours with Falken Motorsports(2014-2019) and KCMG(2020-2021), and finished with a 3rd place in 2015.

=== WEC and 24 Hours of Le Mans ===
In 2013, Imperatori was named as the lead driver for the new endurance racing project from Hong Kong-based KC Motorgroup Ltd (KCMG) which saw him drive a Morgan LMP2 - Nissan at Silverstone and Le Mans. Imperatori was back with KCMG for the 2014 WEC season taking part in all but two races behind the wheel of an Oreca 03R-Nissan, winning LMP2 class at Bahrain and São Paulo.

On 25 March 2015, it was announced that Imperatori had signed with the Swiss Rebellion Racing LMP1 squad for the 2015 WEC season where he piloted the team's second car along with Dominik Kraihamer and Daniel Abt.

== Racing record ==
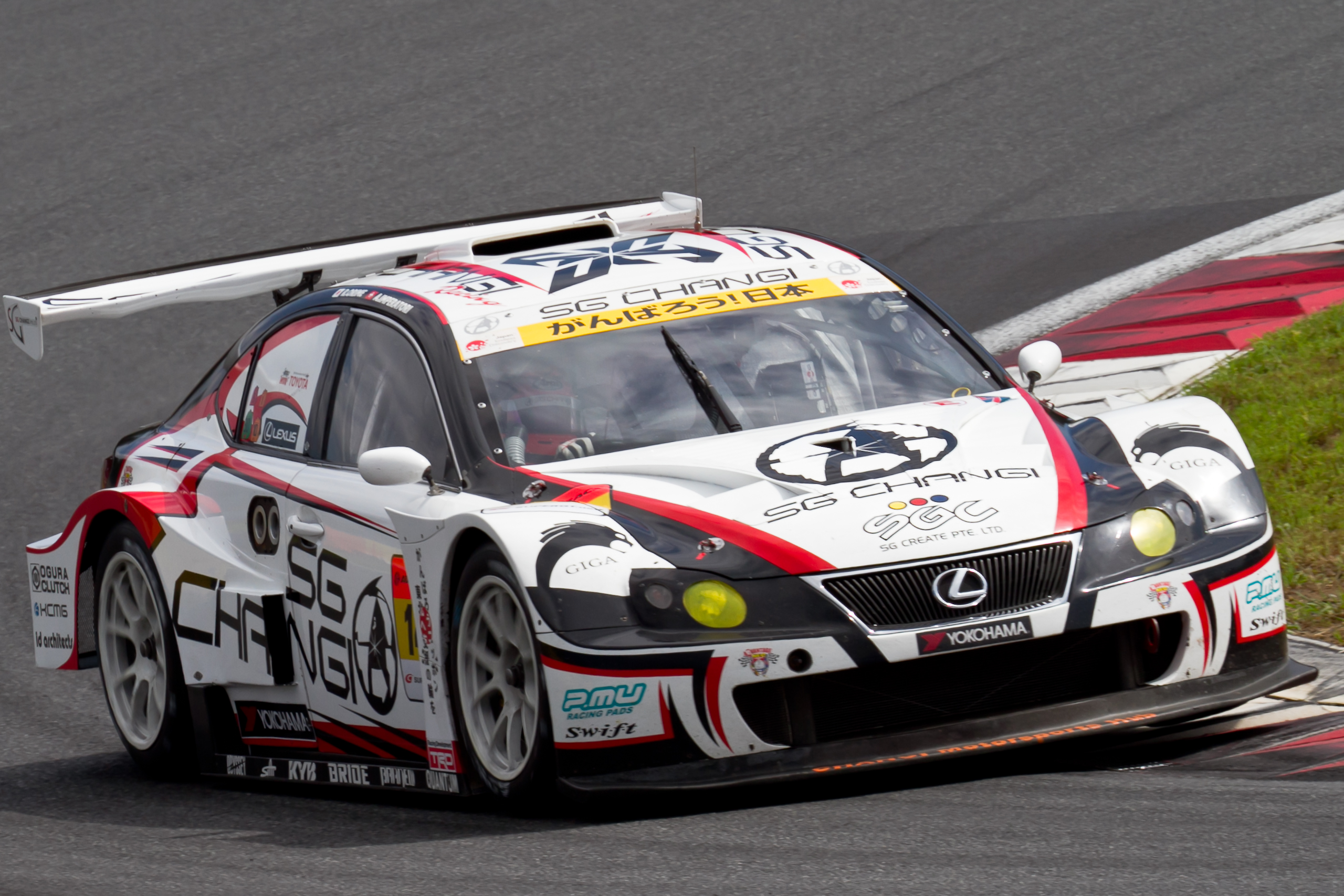
Imperatori driving the Lexus IS350 GT300 in 2011 Super GT season.

=== Complete Super GT results ===
Year	Team	Car	Class	1	2	3	4	5	6	7	8	DC	Pts
2011	Team SG Changi	Lexus IS350	GT300	OKA; 15	FUJ; 16	SEP	SUG; 1	SUZ; 8	FUJ; 2	AUT; 3	MOT; Ret	6th	49
2012	Team SGC	Lexus IS350	GT300	OKA	FUJ	SEP	SUG; 13	SUZ; 13	FUJ; 12	AUT	MOT	NC	0
2014	i-mobile-AAS	Porsche 911 GT3	GT300	OKA	FUJ	AUT	SUG	FUJ	SUZ	**BUR**; 6	MOT	NC	0
2015	Porsche Team KTR	Porsche 911 GT3	GT300	OKA; 14	FUJ; 12	CHA; 8	FUJ; Ret	SUZ	SUG	AUT	MOT	23rd	3

=== 24 Hours of Le Mans results ===
Year	Team	Co-Drivers	Car	Class	Laps	Pos.	Class Pos.
2013	(China) KCMG	(United Kingdom) Matthew Howson (China) Ho-Pin Tung	Morgan LMP2-Nissan	LMP2	241	DNF	DNF
2014	(Hong Kong) KCMG	(United Kingdom) Matthew Howson (United Kingdom) Richard Bradley	Oreca 03R-Nissan	LMP2	87	DNF	DNF
2015	(Switzerland) Rebellion Racing	(Austria) Dominik Kraihamer (Germany) Daniel Abt	Rebellion R-One-AER	LMP1	336	18th	9th
2016	(Switzerland) Rebellion Racing	(Austria) Dominik Kraihamer (Switzerland) Mathéo Tuscher	Rebellion R-One-AER	LMP1	200	DNF	DNF

=== Complete FIA World Endurance Championship results ===
Year	Entrant	Class	Chassis	Engine	1	2	3	4	5	6	7	8	9	Rank	Pts
2014	KCMG	LMP2	Oreca 03	Nissan VK45DE 4.5 L V8	SIL	**SPA**; 2								6th	87
2014	KCMG	LMP2	Oreca 03R	Nissan VK45DE 4.5 L V8			LMS; Ret	COA	FUJ; 2	SHA; Ret	BHR; 1	SÃO; 1		6th	87
2015	Rebellion Racing	LMP1	Rebellion R-One	AER P60 2.4 L Turbo V6	SIL	SPA	LMS; 17	NÜR; Ret	COA; 14	FUJ; 16	SHA; Ret	BHR; 11		25th	2.5
2016	Rebellion Racing	LMP1	Rebellion R-One	AER P60 2.4 L Turbo V6	SIL; 3	SPA; 3	LMS; Ret	NÜR; 7	MEX; 5	COA; 7	FUJ; 6	SHA; 17	BHR; 7	7th	66.5

=== Complete WeatherTech SportsCar Championship results ===
(key) (Races in bold indicate pole position; results in italics indicate fastest lap)

Year	Team	Class	Make	Engine	1	2	3	4	5	6	7	8	9	10	11	12	Pos.	Points
2014	Mühlner Motorsports America	GTD	Porsche 911 GT America	Porsche 4.0 L Flat-6	DAY; 27	SEB	LBH	LGA	DET	WGL	MOS	IMS	ELK	VIR	COA	PET	129th	1
2022	KCMG	GTD Pro	Porsche 911 GT3 R	Porsche MA1.76/MDG.G 4.0 L Flat-6	DAY; 3	SEB	LBH	LGA	WGL	MOS	LIM	ELK	VIR	PET			-*	0*

Sporting positions
Preceded by Keita Sawa	Porsche Carrera Cup Asia; Champion; 2012	Succeeded by Earl Bamber
