= Wolfgang Ullrich =

Austrian engineer

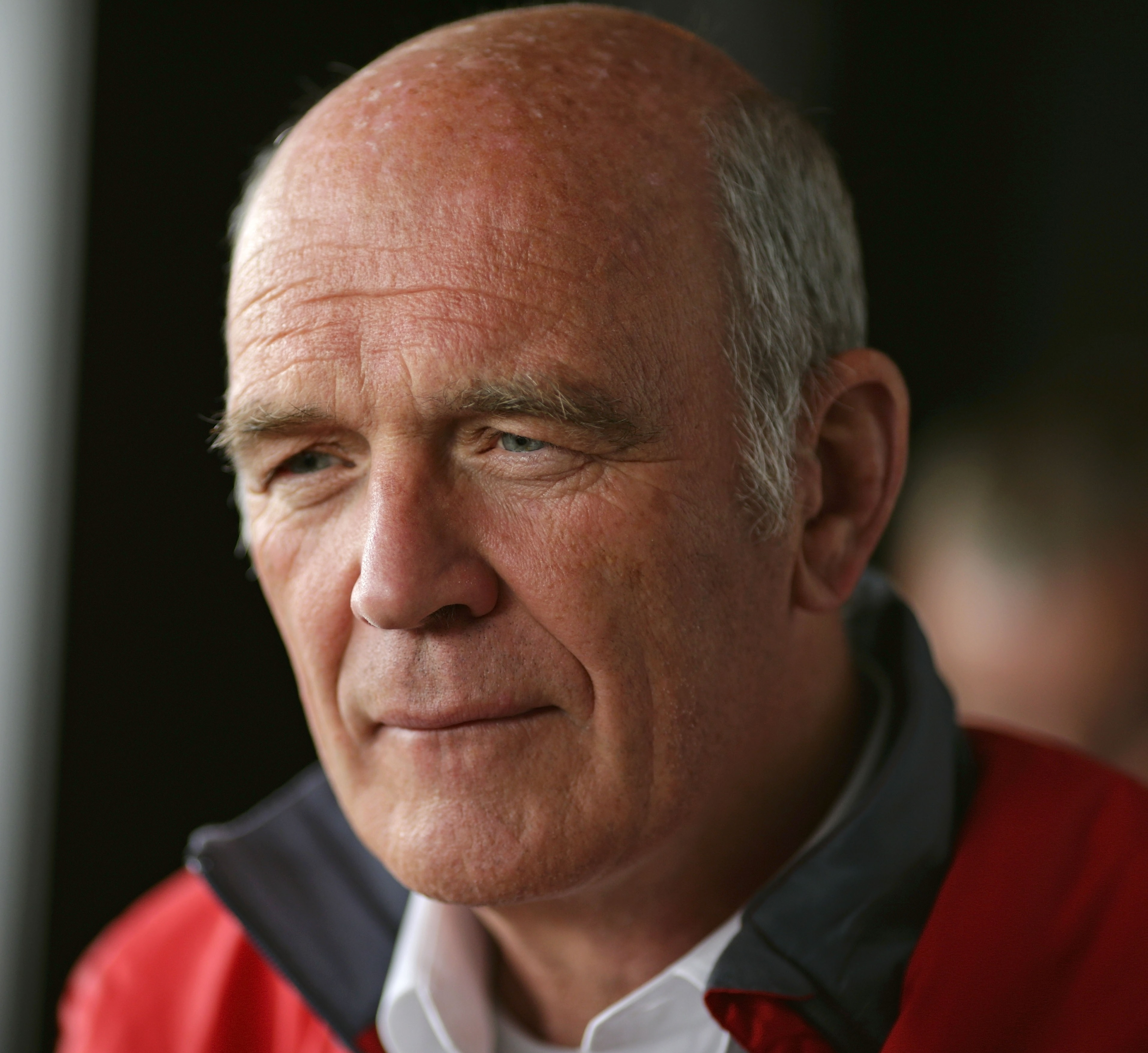
- Wolfgang Ullrich in May 2015
- Born: August 27, 1950 (age 75); Vienna, Austria
- Occupation: Engineer

Wolfgang Ullrich (born August 27, 1950 in Vienna, Austria) is the former Head of Audi Motorsport, the sporting division of German automaker Audi since November 1993. Under his leadership, Audi won the 24 Hours of Le Mans thirteen times: 2000-2002, 2004–2008, and 2010-2014.

== Education ==
He studied for his degree in Vienna in automotive engineering. Ullrich is Doctor of Technical Sciences.

== Early life ==
After graduation he joined Steyr-Daimler-Puch, but wishing to work in motorsport, he was contacted by Renault Sport offering a job with their F1 team. Shortly after, Renault Sport withdrew its offer because of budgetary restrictions imposed by the parent company. He ended up joining Porsche to work on the TAG engine project, and after the withdrawal of the German manufacturer from F1 in late 1987, he went on to work on production engines. In Autumn 1993, when he worked at Gillet, he was contacted by Herbert Demel, a former university colleague and director of the competition department of Audi, Audi Sport, who asked him if he wanted to replace him in office to which he immediately agreed.

== Sport boss at Audi ==
From 1993 through to 2017 Ullrich was the head of sports and special developments for Audi. In this role he was responsible for many different projects of Audi Sport, such as regulating the Audi A4 Super Touring, the Le Mans prototype Audi R18, the Audi RS5 DTM and the development of the diesel hybrid engine. From 2009, he was responsible for the development and expansion of the customer sport with the Audi R8 LMS.

In November 2015, Ullrich was given a contract extension that allowed him to remain in his post past his 67th birthday in 2017. It was company policy at the Volkswagen Group at the time that all employees, save the top echelon of senior management, must retire at 65.

When Ullrich took over as head of Audi Sport in November 1993, he oversaw its various successes in Super Touring, 13 victories at the 24 Hours of Le Mans, as well as seven DTM driver's titles and four DTM constructors titles.

Ullrich was succeeded by Dieter Gass as the Head of Motorsport at Audi.
