= List of 24 Hours of Le Mans records =

List of 24 hours lemans record

This is a list of records in the 24 Hours of Le Mans since 1923. This page is accurate up to and including the 2025 24 Hours of Le Mans.

== Constructor records ==
=== Most total wins ===
Rank	Constructor	Wins	Year(s)
1	(Germany) Porsche	19	1970–1971, 1976–1977, 1979, (Note: The 1979 victory is listed with Porsche, although the car, a Kremer K3 (or 935 K3), was built by Kremer on a Porsche 930 chassis sourced from Porsche, fitted with a Porsche Typ 935/80 engine, used in the 935/78.) 1981–1987, 1994, (Note: The 1994 victory is listed with Porsche, although Dauer Sportwagen was the official constructor of the road car. The car, a Dauer 962 Le Mans, was heavily modified from a customer Porsche 962 chassis for street use and race homologation.) 1996–1998, (Note: The 1996 and 1997 victories are listed with Porsche, although the car was built by TWR on a modified Jaguar XJR-14 chassis, fitted with a Porsche 962 engine.) 2015–2017
2	(Germany) Audi	13	2000–2002, 2004–2008, 2010–2014
3	(Italy) Ferrari	12	1949, 1954, 1958, 1960–1965, 2023–2025
4	(United Kingdom) Jaguar	7	1951, 1953, 1955–1957, 1988, 1990
5	(United Kingdom) Bentley	6	1924, 1927–1930, 2003
5	(Japan) Toyota	6	2018–2022, 2026
7	(Italy) Alfa Romeo	4	1931–1934
7	(United States) Ford	4	1966–1969
9	(France) Matra-Simca	3	1972–1974
9	(France) Peugeot	3	1992–1993, 2009
11	(France) Lorraine-Dietrich	2	1925–1926
11	(France) Bugatti	2	1937, 1939
13	(France) Chenard & Walcker	1	1923
13	(United Kingdom) Lagonda	1	1935
13	(France) Delahaye	1	1938
13	(France) Talbot-Lago	1	1950
13	(Germany) Mercedes-Benz	1	1952
13	(United Kingdom) Aston Martin	1	1959
13	(United Kingdom) Mirage	1	1975
13	(France) Renault-Alpine	1	1978
13	(France) Rondeau	1	1980
13	(Switzerland) Sauber-Mercedes	1	1989
13	(Japan) Mazda	1	1991
13	(United Kingdom) McLaren	1	1995
13	(Germany) BMW	1	1999

=== Most consecutive wins ===
Wins	Constructor	Consecutive wins
7	(Germany) Porsche	1981–1987
6	(Italy) Ferrari	1960–1965
5	(Germany) Audi	2004–2008
5	(Germany) Audi	2010–2014
5	(Japan) Toyota	2018–2022
4	(United Kingdom) Bentley	1927–1930
4	(Italy) Alfa Romeo	1931–1934
4	(United States) Ford	1966–1969
3	(United Kingdom) Jaguar	1955–1957
3	(France) Matra-Simca	1972–1974
3	(Germany) Porsche	1996–1998
3	(Germany) Audi	2000–2002
3	(Germany) Porsche	2015–2017
3	(Italy) Ferrari	2023–2025

=== Most win(s) by nations ===
Rank	Nation	Win(s)	Constructor(s)
1	Germany	34	4
2	United Kingdom	17	6
3	Italy	16	2
4	France	15	9
5	Japan	7	2
6	United States	4	1
7	Switzerland	1	1

=== Most wins by cars ===
Rank	Car	Wins	Years
1	(Germany) Audi R8	5	2000–2002, 2004–2005
2	(Italy) Alfa Romeo 8C 2300	4	1931–1934
2	(United States) Ford GT40	4	1966–1969
2	(Germany) Porsche 956	4	1982–1985
2	(Germany) Audi R18	4	2011–2014
6	(United Kingdom) Jaguar D-Type	3	1955–1957
6	(Italy) Ferrari 250 TR	3	1958, 1960–1961
6	(France) Matra-Simca MS670	3	1972–1974
6	(Germany) Porsche 936	3	1976–1977, 1981
6	(Germany) Audi R10 TDI	3	2006–2008
6	(Germany) Porsche 919 Hybrid	3	2015–2017
6	(Japan) Toyota TS050 Hybrid	3	2018–2020
6	(Italy) Ferrari 499P	3	2023–2025
6	(Japan) Toyota GR010 Hybrid/Toyota TR010 Hybrid	3	2021–2022, 2026
15	(France) Lorraine-Dietrich B3-6	2	1925–1926
15	(United Kingdom) Bentley Speed Six	2	1929–1930
15	(France) Bugatti Type 57	2	1937, 1939
15	(Germany) Porsche 917K	2	1970–1971
15	(Germany) Porsche 962C	2	1986–1987
15	(France) Peugeot 905	2	1992–1993
15	(Germany) Porsche WSC-95	2	1996–1997

=== Most wins by team ===
Rank	Team	Wins	Year(s)
1	(Germany) Joest Racing	15	1984–1985, 1996–1997, 2000–2002, 2006–2008, 2010–2014
2	(Germany) Porsche	12	1976–1977, 1981–1983, 1986–1987, 1994, 1998, 2015–2017
3	(Italy) Scuderia Ferrari	7	1954, 1958, 1960–1964
4	(Japan) Toyota Racing	6	2018–2022, 2026
5	(United Kingdom) Bentley Motors Ltd.	5	1927–1930, 2003
6	(United Kingdom) Jaguar	3	1951, 1953, 1955
6	(United Kingdom) John Wyer Automotive Engineering	3	1968–1969, 1975
6	(France) Matra Sports	3	1972–1974
6	(Germany) Martini Racing	3	1971, 1976–1977
6	(France) Peugeot Sport	3	1992–1993, 2009
6	(Italy) AF Corse	3	2023–2025
12	(France) Société Lorraine De Dietrich et Cie	2	1925–1926
12	(France) Raymond Sommer	2	1932–1933
12	(United Kingdom) Ecurie Ecosse	2	1956–1957
12	(United States) Shelby American Inc.	2	1966–1967
12	(United Kingdom) Tom Walkinshaw Racing	2	1988, 1990

=== Most consecutive wins by specific cars ===
Wins	Car with serial number	Year	Cite
2	(United Kingdom) Bentley Speed Six #LB2332	1929–1930	
2	(Italy) Ferrari 250 P/275 P #0816 (Note: This had gone unnoticed until 2018, when documents verifying the identity of the real winner was discovered by Ferrari Classiche. 0814 had long been identified as the winner of the 1963 race when it was badly damaged in a practice accident at the Nürburgring one month prior to Le Mans. This car was submitted to enter the race, not 0816 when it was still being repaired throughout, according to factory documentation. Rather than submitting new paperwork for a replacement entry, the Scuderia sent 0816 to Le Mans under 0814's identity.)	1963–1964	
2	(United States) Ford GT40 #P-1075	1968–1969	
2	(Germany) Porsche 956 #117	1984–1985	
2	(Germany) TWR Porsche WSC-95 #691	1996–1997	

=== Other constructor records ===
Description	Record	Details
Wins
Most class wins	108	(Germany) Porsche
Most class wins in a single race	5	(Germany) Porsche in 1981 and 1982
Podiums
Most 1–2 finishes	12	(Germany) Porsche in 1970, 1971, 1979, 1982–1987, 1996, 1998, 2015
Most podiums	55	(Germany) Porsche (Note: 19 victories, 18 second positions and 17 third positions.)
Most podium lockouts	8	(Germany) Porsche in 1970, 1979, 1982–1986, 1996
Most consecutive podiums	18	(Germany) Audi between 1999 and 2016
Most cars from the same constructor in a row	8	(Germany) Porsche in 1983
Most podiums before first win	6	(Japan) Toyota (Note: 5 second positions and 1 third position.)
Most podiums without winning	3	(France) Pescarolo (Note: 2 second positions and 1 third position.)
Starts
Most participations by a single constructor	73	(Germany) Porsche between 1951 and 2023
Most entries by a single constructor in a single race	33	(Germany) Porsche in 1971 (33 starters/49)
Most entries by a single constructor (total)	861	(Germany) Porsche since 1951
Most participations without winning	38	(United States) Chevrolet
Most participations without a podium	38	(United States) Chevrolet
Most participations without a class win	15	(Japan) Dome
Most participations without finishing	6	(Austria) ByKolles/Enso CLM
Fewest starts before first win	1st start	(France) Chenard & Walcker (1923) (Italy) Ferrari (1949) (United Kingdom) McLaren (1995)
Most starts before first win	20th start	(Germany) Porsche (Japan) Toyota
Pole positions
Most consecutive pole positions	6	(Germany) Porsche between 1978 and 1983 (Japan) Toyota between 2017 and 2022
Fastest laps
Most total fastest laps	14	(Germany) Porsche in 1968–1971, 1977, 1979–1981, 1983, 1985–1986, 1988, 1994, 1997
Most consecutive fastest laps	5	(Germany) Audi between 2011 and 2015

== Driver records ==
=== Most total wins ===
Rank	Drivers	Wins	Years
1	(Denmark) Tom Kristensen	9	1997, 2000–2005, 2008, 2013
2	(Belgium) Jacky Ickx	6	1969, 1975–1977, 1981–1982
3	(United Kingdom) Derek Bell	5	1975, 1981–1982, 1986–1987
3	(Germany) Frank Biela	5	2000–2002, 2006–2007
3	(Italy) Emanuele Pirro	5	2000–2002, 2006–2007
6	(Belgium) Olivier Gendebien	4	1958, 1960–1962
6	(France) Henri Pescarolo	4	1972–1974, 1984
6	(France) Yannick Dalmas	4	1992, 1994–1995, 1999
6	(Switzerland) Sébastien Buemi	4	2018–2020, 2022
9	(United Kingdom) Woolf Barnato	3	1928–1930
9	(Italy) (United States) Luigi Chinetti	3	1932, 1934, 1949
9	(United States) Phil Hill	3	1958, 1961–1962
9	(Germany) Klaus Ludwig	3	1979, 1984–1985
9	(United States) Al Holbert	3	1983, 1986–1987
9	(United States) Hurley Haywood	3	1977, 1983, 1994
9	(Germany) Marco Werner	3	2005–2007
9	(Italy) Rinaldo Capello	3	2003–2004, 2008
9	(United Kingdom) Allan McNish	3	1998, 2008, 2013
9	(Switzerland) Marcel Fässler	3	2011–2012, 2014
9	(Germany) André Lotterer	3	2011–2012, 2014
9	(France) Benoît Tréluyer	3	2011–2012, 2014
9	(Japan) Kazuki Nakajima	3	2018–2020
9	(New Zealand) Brendon Hartley	3	2017, 2020, 2022
23	(France) André Rossignol	2	1925–1926
23	(United Kingdom) Henry Birkin	2	1929, 1931
23	(France) Raymond Sommer	2	1932–1933
23	(France) Jean-Pierre Wimille	2	1937, 1939
23	(United Kingdom) Ivor Bueb	2	1955, 1957
23	(United Kingdom) Ron Flockhart	2	1956-1957
23	(France) Gérard Larrousse	2	1973-1974
23	(Netherlands) Gijs van Lennep	2	1971, 1976
23	(France) Jean-Pierre Jaussaud	2	1978, 1980
23	(Germany) Hans-Joachim Stuck	2	1986–1987
23	(Germany) Manuel Reuter	2	1989, 1996
23	(Finland) JJ Lehto	2	1995, 2005
23	(Austria) Alexander Wurz	2	1996, 2009
23	(France) Romain Dumas	2	2010, 2016
23	(Germany) Timo Bernhard	2	2010, 2017
23	(New Zealand) Earl Bamber	2	2015, 2017
23	(Spain) Fernando Alonso	2	2018-2019
23	(United Kingdom) Mike Conway	2	2021, 2026
23	(Japan) Kamui Kobayashi	2	2021, 2026

=== Most consecutive wins ===
Rank	Drivers	Consecutive wins	Years
1	(Denmark) Tom Kristensen	6	2000–2005
2	(United Kingdom) Woolf Barnato	3	1928–1930
2	(Belgium) Olivier Gendebien	3	1960–1962
2	(France) Henri Pescarolo	3	1972–1974
2	(Belgium) Jacky Ickx	3	1975–1977
2	(Italy) Emanuele Pirro	3	2000–2002
2	(Germany) Frank Biela	3	2000–2002
2	(Germany) Marco Werner	3	2005–2007
2	(Switzerland) Sebastien Buemi	3	2018–2020
2	(Japan) Kazuki Nakajima	3	2018–2020

=== Most winning drivers per nation ===
Rank	Nation	Winning drivers
1	United Kingdom	35
2	France	28
3	Germany	18
4	Italy	14
5	United States	13
6	Belgium	5
6	Japan	5
8	Australia	4
8	Netherlands	4
8	New Zealand	4
10	Austria	3
10	Spain	3
10	Denmark	3
10	Switzerland	3
15	Argentina	2
15	Sweden	2
17	Canada	1
17	Finland	1
17	Mexico	1
17	Monaco	1
17	Poland	1
17	China	1

=== Most total driver wins per nation ===
Rank	Nation	Wins
1	United Kingdom	47
2	France	42
3	Germany	31
4	Italy	21
5	United States	19
6	Belgium	13
7	Denmark	11
8	Switzerland	8
8	Japan	8
10	New Zealand	7
11	Australia	4
11	Austria	4
11	Spain	4
11	Netherlands	4
15	Argentina	2
15	Finland	2
15	Sweden	2
18	Canada	1
18	Mexico	1
18	Monaco	1
18	Poland	1
18	China	1

=== Drivers who have won in their first entries ===
Rank	Driver	Year
1	(France) André Lagache	1923
1	(France) René Léonard	1923
1	(Australia) Bernard Rubin	1928
1	(United Kingdom) Woolf Barnato	1928
1	(Italy) Luigi Chinetti	1932
1	(Italy) Tazio Nuvolari	1933
1	(France) Philippe Etancelin	1934
1	(United Kingdom) Luis Fontés	1935
1	(France) Jean-Pierre Wimille	1937
1	(United Kingdom) Peter Walker	1951
1	(Germany) Fritz Riess	1952
1	(Germany) Hermann Lang	1952
1	(United Kingdom) Ivor Bueb	1955
1	(United States) A. J. Foyt	1967
1	(United States) Hurley Haywood	1977
1	(United Kingdom) Andy Wallace	1988
1	(France) Christophe Bouchut	1993
1	(France) Éric Hélary	1993
1	(Austria) Alexander Wurz	1996
1	(Denmark) Tom Kristensen	1997
1	(France) Laurent Aïello	1998
1	(Germany) Nico Hülkenberg	2015
1	(New Zealand) Earl Bamber	2015
1	(Spain) Fernando Alonso	2018

=== Drivers who have won in all of their entries ===
Rank	Driver	Number of Entries	Win(s)	Year(s)
1	(United Kingdom) Woolf Barnato	3	3	1928–1930
2	(France) Jean-Pierre Wimille	2	2	1937, 1939
2	(Spain) Fernando Alonso	2	2	2018–2019
4	(United Kingdom) Luis Fontés	1	1	1935
4	(Germany) Hermann Lang	1	1	1952
4	(United States) A. J. Foyt	1	1	1967
4	(Italy) Tazio Nuvolari	1	1	1933
4	(Germany) Nico Hülkenberg	1	1	2015

=== Most total starts ===
Rank	Driver	Starts
1	(France) Henri Pescarolo	33
2	(France) Bob Wollek	30
3	(Japan) Yojiro Terada	29
4	(United Kingdom) Derek Bell	26
5	(France) François Migault	24
5	(Denmark) Jan Magnussen	24
5	(Netherlands) Jan Lammers	24
5	(France) Emmanuel Collard	24
5	(France) Romain Dumas	24
9	(France) Claude Ballot-Lena	23
9	(Monaco) Olivier Beretta	23
9	(Denmark) Jan Magnussen	23

=== Other driver records ===
Description	Record	Details
Wins
Youngest winner overall	22 years, 91 days	(Austria) Alexander Wurz in 1996
Youngest winner by class	18 years, 352 days	(France) Julien Andlauer in 2018 (LM GTE Am category)
Oldest winner	47 years, 343 days	(United States) Luigi Chinetti in 1949
Most wins with different constructors	4	(France) Yannick Dalmas (Peugeot, Porsche, McLaren, BMW)
Most time between successive wins	13 years	(Austria) Alexander Wurz (1996 – 2009)
Most time between first and last wins	17 years	(United States) Hurley Haywood (1977 – 1994)
Most starts before first win	16th start	(Australia) David Brabham in 2009
Most wins with the same driver lineup	3	(Belgium) Olivier Gendebien, (United States) Phil Hill (1958, 1961, 1962) (Belgium) Jacky Ickx, (United Kingdom) Derek Bell (1975, 1981, 1982) (Denmark) Tom Kristensen, (Germany) Frank Biela, (Italy) Emanuele Pirro (2000, 2001, 2002) (Switzerland) Marcel Fässler, (Germany) André Lotterer, (France) Benoît Tréluyer (2011, 2012, 2014)
Lowest start position before win	19th (Note: Herbert qualified his Mazdaspeed entry in 12th place, but exceptional rules—which saw the first ten grid positions reserved for Category 1 cars—meant they started 19th.)	(Belgium) Bertrand Gachot, (United Kingdom) Johnny Herbert and (Germany) Volker Weidler in 1991
Starts and finishes
Youngest driver to start a race	16 years, 119 days	(United States) Josh Pierson (2022)
Oldest driver to start a race	75 years, 269 days	(United States) Dominique Bastien (2021)
Youngest driver to finish a race	16 years, 120 days	(United States) Josh Pierson (2022)
Oldest driver to finish a race	75 years, 270 days	(United States) Dominique Bastien (2021)
Most consecutive starts	30	(France) Henri Pescarolo (1970 – 1999)
Most consecutive finishes	11	(United States) Johnny O'Connell (1999 – 2009)
Most time between successive starts	21 years	(France) Jean Alesi (1989 – 2010)
Most races between first and last start	36	(Netherlands) Jan Lammers (1983 – 2018)
Most starts without finishing one race	14	(Germany) Hans Heyer (Note: He entered 12 times but raced for 2 different cars in 1973 and 1977.)
Most starts without winning (overall)	30	(France) Bob Wollek
Most time in the car during 24 hours	24 hours	(United Kingdom) Edward Ramsden Hall in 1950 (Note: He became the first and only man to drive solo for the entire distance, despite having a co-driver in the pits ready to take over. He completed 236 laps, which equals to nearly 3,200 km (2,000 miles).)
Most time in the car during 24 hours for a winner	23 h 15 min 17s	(France) Louis Rosier in 1950 (Note: He won Le Mans with his son Jean-Louis Rosier who raced just 2 laps.)
Most entries with different constructors	16	(France) François Migault (Note: Ferrari in 1972, 1973, 1977, 1978 and 1998 Matra in 1974, Ligier in 1975, Mirage in 1976, De Cadenet in 1979 and 1980, Rondeau in 1981 and 1982, Ford in 1983, Lola in 1984, WM in 1986 and 1987, Courage/Cougar in 1988 and 1991, ALD in 1990, Porsche in 1993, Dodge in 1994, Marcos in 1995 and 1997, Pilbeam in 2001, Dome in 2002. He could have added a 17th constructor in 1992 (Spice) but he did not start the race.)
Most entries with the same constructor	20	(France) Bob Wollek with (Germany) Porsche (1975–1983, 1986–1990,1993, 1996–2000)
Most entries as teammates	14	(United States) Tracy Krohn and (Sweden) Niclas Jönsson (2006–2019)
Most finishes	19	(United Kingdom) Derek Bell
Most retirements	18	(France) Henri Pescarolo
Podiums
Most podiums	14	(Denmark) Tom Kristensen
Most podiums without a win overall	6	(France) Bob Wollek
Most consecutive podium finishes	9	(Italy) Emanuele Pirro (1999–2007)
Youngest driver on the podium overall	18 years, 133 days	(Mexico) Ricardo Rodriguez (2nd in 1960)
Oldest driver on the podium overall	55 years, 110 days	(United States) Mario Andretti (2nd in 1995)
Oldest driver on the podium by class	68 years, 111 days	(South Africa) Jack Gerber (3rd in 2013 in the LM GTE Am category)
Biggest gap between first and last podiums overall	19 years, 361 days	(France) Bob Wollek (1978–1998)
Most races without a podium overall	29	(Japan) Yojiro Terada
Pole positions
Most total pole positions	5	(Belgium) Jacky Ickx (1975, 1978, 1981, 1982, 1983)
Most consecutive pole positions	3	(Belgium) Jacky Ickx (1981, 1982, 1983) (France) Stéphane Sarrazin (2007, 2008, 2009) (Japan) Kamui Kobayashi (2019, 2020, 2021)
Most race wins from pole position	3	(Belgium) Jacky Ickx (1975, 1981, 1982)
Most pole positions without winning	3	(France) Bob Wollek (1979, 1984, 1987) (France) Stéphane Sarrazin (2007, 2008, 2009)
Youngest polesitter	23 years, 146 days	(Mexico) Pedro Rodríguez (1963)
Oldest polesitter	43 years, 220 days	(France) Bob Wollek (1987)
Fastest laps
Most total fastest laps	5	(Belgium) Jacky Ickx (1977, 1979, 1980, 1983, 1985)
Most consecutive fastest laps	4	(United Kingdom) Mike Hawthorn (1955, 1956, 1957, 1958)
Youngest driver to set fastest lap	19 years, 114 days	(Mexico) Ricardo Rodriguez (1961)
Oldest driver to set fastest lap	51 years, 44 days	(United Kingdom) Francis Curzon (1935)

== Race records ==
Description	Record	Details
Longest distance covered	5410.713 km (397 laps)	(Germany) Audi R15+ TDI in 2010
Most laps completed	397	1971 & 2010
Fastest lap in race	3:17.297	(United Kingdom) Mike Conway with a Toyota TS050 Hybrid in 2019
Fastest lap (since 1990, pole position)	3:14.791	(Japan) Kamui Kobayashi with a Toyota TS050 Hybrid in 2017
Fastest lap (until 1989, pole position)	3:13.90	(Mexico) Pedro Rodríguez with a Porsche 917 in 1971
Smallest winning margin	20 meters	In 1966 between two (United States) Ford GT40s (Note: At the finish, Ford decided to stage publicity photo between Miles/Hulme and McLaren/Amon with the No. 5 following, too. According to witnesses, McLaren left a small margin to Miles and it was expected than Miles/Hulme will be declared winner after the examination of the photo finish. But the ACO declared the McLaren/Amon car had won the race, having covered more distance in 24 hours, as it had started the race several places behind the Miles/Hulme car. The ACO estimated the difference to 8 meters.)
Largest winning margin	349.808 km	In 1927 between a (United Kingdom) Bentley and a Salmson
Highest average race speed by a winner	225.228 km/h (140 mph)	(Germany) Audi R15+ TDI in 2010
Highest average lap speed (qualifying)	251.881 km/h (157 mph)	(Japan) Kamui Kobayashi with a Toyota TS050 Hybrid in 2017
Highest average lap speed (race)	248.628 km/h (154 mph)	(United Kingdom) Mike Conway with a Toyota TS050 Hybrid in 2019
Highest top speed	407 km/h (253 mph)	(France) Roger Dorchy with a WM P88-Peugeot in 1988
Most cars in a single race	62	In 2022, 2023, 2024, 2025 and 2026
Fewest cars in a single race	17	In 1930
Most finishers	53	In 2022
Fewest finishers	6	In 1931
Highest percentage of finishers	90.9%	In 1923 (30/33 finishers)
Lowest percentage of finishers	13.7%	In 1970 (7/51 finishers)
Most cars in the leading lap	9	In 2024
Most time behind the safety car	6 hrs 54 min 27 secs	In 2024
Most safety cars in a race	12	In 2013
Highest attendance	400,000	In 1969
Lowest attendance	150,000	In 1958

== Grid start records ==
Note: The first qualification occurred in 1963.

=== Most pole positions by constructor ===
Rank	Constructor	Pole position(s)	Year(s)
1	(Germany) Porsche	19	1968–1971, 1978–1983, 1985–1988, 1996–1997, 2015–2016, 2024
2	(Germany) Audi	8	2000–2002, 2004, 2006, 2011–2013
2	(Japan) Toyota	8	1999, 2014, 2017–2022
4	(France) Peugeot	6	1992–1993, 2007–2010
5	(Italy) Ferrari	4	1963–1964, 1973, 2023
6	(United States) Ford	3	1965–1967
7	(France) Matra-Simca	2	1972, 1974
7	(France) Renault-Alpine	2	1976, 1977
7	(Switzerland) Sauber-Mercedes	2	1989, 1991
10	(United Kingdom) Mirage	1	1975
10	(Italy) Lancia	1	1984
10	(Japan) Nissan	1	1990
10	(France) Courage	1	1994
10	(France) Welter Racing	1	1995
10	(Germany) Mercedes	1	1998
10	(United Kingdom) Bentley	1	2003
10	(France) Pescarolo	1	2005
10	(United States) Cadillac	1	2025
10	(Germany) BMW	1	2026

=== Most wins per starting position ===
Rank	Starting position	Win(s)	Year(s)
1	1st (pole)	13	1974, 1975, 1981, 1982, 1997, 2003, 2011, 2012, 2013, 2016, 2018, 2021, 2022
2	2nd	12	1963, 1972, 1976, 1986, 1987, 1992, 2000, 2001, 2002, 2006, 2019, 2023
3	4th	10	1966, 1968, 1973, 1984, 1985, 2004, 2007, 2008, 2017, 2024
4	5th	6	1971, 1978, 1980, 1998, 2009, 2010
5	6th	5	1988, 1993, 1996, 1999, 2014
6	7th	4	1964, 1977, 1983, 1994
7	9th	3	1967, 1990, 1995
7	3rd	3	1979, 2015, 2020
9	11th	2	1965, 1989
9	14th	2	1969, 2026
11	16th	1	1970
11	19th	1	1991
11	8th	1	2005
11	13th	1	2025

== Other records ==
=== Most wins by tyre supplier ===
Rank	Manufacturer	Win(s)	Year(s)
1	(France) Michelin	35	1923, 1978, 1989, 1992–1993, 1995, 1998–2026 (Note: From 2013, Michelin became the sole supplier of tires for the lead class.)
2	(United Kingdom) Dunlop	34	1924–1931, 1935, 1937–1939, 1950–1951, 1953, 1955–1957, 1960–1964, 1977, 1979, 1981–1988, 1991
3	(United States) Goodyear	14	1965–1967, 1970, 1972–1976, 1980, 1990, 1994, 1996–1997
4	(Belgium) Englebert	5	1932–1934, 1949, 1958
5	(United States) Firestone	3	1968–1969, 1971
6	(Germany) Continental	1	1952
6	(Italy) Pirelli	1	1954
6	(United Kingdom) Avon	1	1956

=== Most wins by fuel type ===
Rank	Fuel	Wins	Year(s)
1	Petrol	73	1923–2005
2	Petrol-electric hybrid	12	2015–2026
3	Diesel	6	2006–2011
4	Diesel-electric hybrid	3	2012–2014
