= Audi R18 =

Le Mans Prototype racing car

Audi R18 TDI Audi R18 ultra Audi R18 e-tron quattro
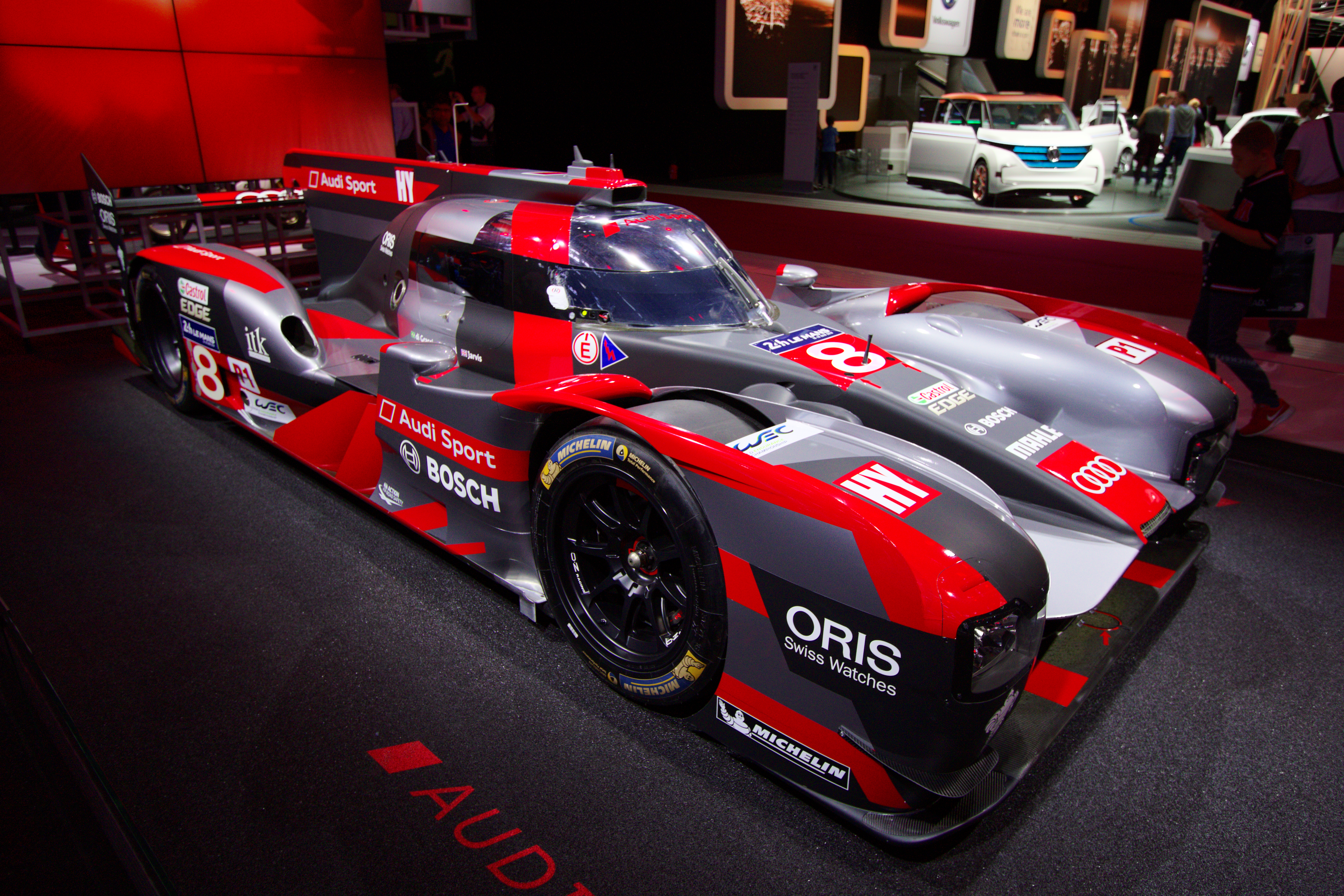
- The Audi R18 at the 2016 Paris Motor Show.
- Category: LMP1 (Audi R18 TDI); LMP1-H (Audi R18 e-tron quattro)
- Constructor: Audi (Dallara, YCOM) (Note: Dallara from 2011–2013, YCOM from 2014–2016)
- Designers: Christopher Reinke (Technical Project Leader); Wolfgang Appel (Head of Vehicle Development); Martin Mühlmeier (Head of Technology); Ulrich Baretzky (Head of Engine Development)
- Predecessor: Audi R15 TDI

Technical specifications
- Chassis: Carbon fibre and Aluminum monocoque, CFC rear crash structure
- Suspension (front): Independent double-wishbone push rod system
- Suspension (rear): Independent double-wishbone pull rod system
- Length: 4,650 mm (183 in)
- Width: 2,000 mm (79 in); 1,900 mm (75 in) (2014, 2015)
- Height: 1,030 mm (41 in); 1,050 mm (41 in) (2014, 2015)
- Engine: Audi RP series TDI; 2011–2013: 3.7 litres (226 cubic inches); 2014–2016: 4.0 litres (244 cubic inches) 120° V6 single-turbocharged diesel, mid-engined, longitudinally mounted with quattro permanent four-wheel-drive system
- Transmission: Audi with Hewland internals 6-speed + 1 reverse electrically-activated sequential S-Tronic semi-automatic transmission operated by paddle-shift with limited-slip rear differential
- Power: 383 + 350 kW (514 + 469 hp) with MGU push-to-pass boost (300 kW (402 hp) MGU push-to-pass boost for Le Mans 24 hours only)
- Weight: 900 kilograms (2,000 lb); 2013: 915 kilograms (2,017 lb); 2014: 875 kilograms (1,929 lb)
- Fuel: BP Ultimate Diesel (2012-2013) later Shell V-Power Diesel (2014-2016)
- Lubricants: Castrol Edge Turbo Diesel
- Tyres: Michelin

Competition history
- Notable entrants: (Germany) Audi Sport Team Joest (Germany) Audi Sport North America
- Debut: 2011 1000 km Spa
- First win: 2011 24 Hours of Le Mans
- Last win: 2016 6 Hours of Bahrain
- Last event: 2016 6 Hours of Bahrain
Races	Wins	Poles	F/Laps
47	18	14	16
- Constructors' Championships: 2 (2012 FIA WEC, 2013 FIA WEC)
- Drivers' Championships: 2 (2012 FIA WEC, 2013 FIA WEC)

The Audi R18 is series of Le Mans Prototype (LMP) racing cars constructed by the German car manufacturer Audi AG. It is the successor to the Audi R15 TDI. Like its predecessor, the R18 uses a TDI turbocharged diesel engine but with a reduced capacity of 3.7 litres and in a V6 configuration. For the first time since the 1999 R8C, the Audi Le Mans prototype used a closed cockpit design. The R18 is also the first racing car from Audi to feature hybrid power.

Although Audi have previously given each new developed model of endurance racing car a distinct model number, the head of Audi Sport, Wolfgang Ullrich, suggested the R18 designation for Audi endurance racing cars could be used for the foreseeable future. There were five further evolutions of R18 until Audi exited the FIA World Endurance Championship in 2016.

== 2011: R18 TDI (RP1) ==
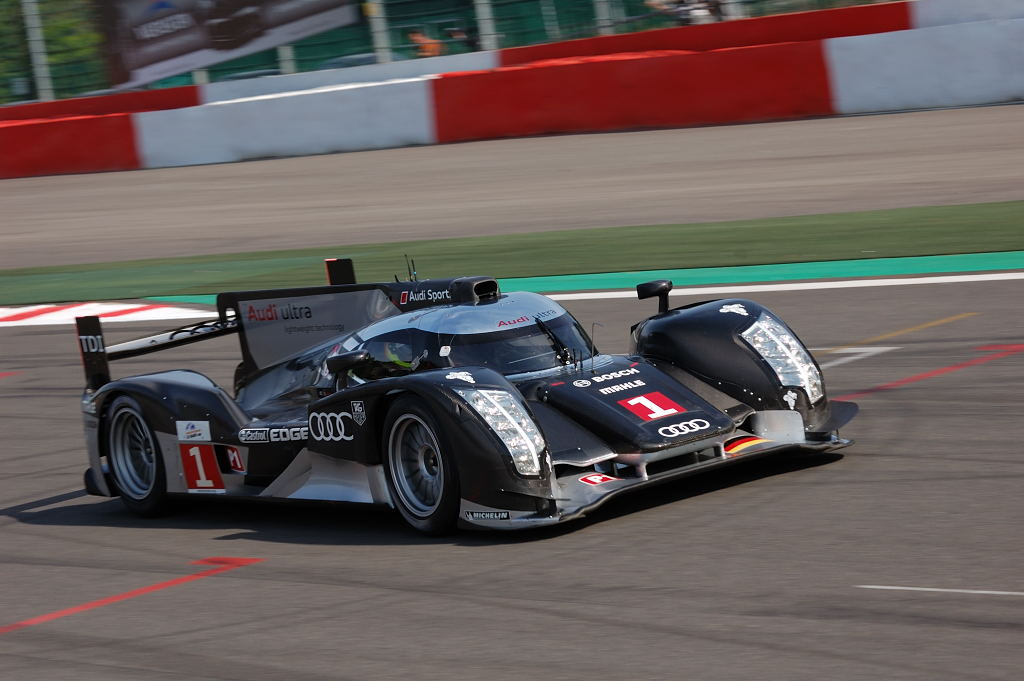
Audi R18 TDI Ultra at the 2011 1000 km of Spa, its debut race

Due to the new regulations introduced in 2011 which significantly reduced diesel engine displacement and thus power and torque as a result, Audi moved to a closed-cockpit concept to reduce drag in order to increase efficiency and maintain top speed.

Despite the theoretically heavier closed-cockpit concept, a heavy focus on weight reduction resulted in the R18 being lighter than the previous R15 at 850 kg (1,870 lb) (excluding 50 kg (110 lb) of ballast to hit the 900 kg (1,984 lb) minimum weight limit), with rumors that the single-piece monocoque weighed as little as 70 kg (150 lb). The R18 had a 64 mm (2.5 in) shorter wheelbase than the R15 due to its smaller V6 engine, and it used a double-wishbone suspension with pushrod torsion bars and dampers at both front and rear. The R18 uses wider front tires that are similar in width to the rear tires unlike previous cars, which were custom developed for the R18 by Michelin.

In addition to the Sauber wind tunnel located in Hinwil, Switzerland, Audi also tested the R18 in a climatic wind tunnel to test the effects of rain on the car, including visibility and windshield wiper performance. Additionally, it allowed for the optimization of driver cooling airflow within the cockpit, allowing for the removal of the driver air conditioning unit while staying under regulatory temperature limits, saving weight and gaining power and efficiency. Additionally, the R18 featured a heated windscreen first developed in Audi's A4 DTM program.

The R18's new 3.7 L V6 which began development in 2009 uses an aluminium alloy block and 120 bank angle, chosen to reduce the center of gravity, allow for a hot-vee turbocharger layout, and provide room for a potential hybrid system. Additionally, it is equipped with a diesel particulate filter, which resulted in the car's quiet engine note and relative lack of exhaust soot. The engine weighed 25% lighter than the R15's 5.5L V10 and was a similar weight to the R8's 3.6L petrol V8. It is claimed to develop over 540 horsepower (403 kW; 547 PS) and 900 N⋅m (664 lb⋅ft) of torque. The engine uses a single Garrett (Honeywell Turbo Technologies) TR30R VGT turbocharger in a hot valley (hot vee) configuration, as opposed to the twin TR30R configuration of both the Peugeot 908 HDi FAP and the previous Audi R15 TDI.

The R18 uses a new 6-speed gearbox custom-designed by Xtrac which was controlled electrically rather than pneumatically, saving weight by eliminating the pneumatic system.

As per the new rules for Le Mans in 2011, the car featured a stabilisation fin on the engine cover. Additionally, the R18 was Audi's first car to feature LED headlights.

The R18's launch event was held on 10 December 2010 in Ingolstadt. After private testing of the initial specification of the car at Sebring, the R18 appeared at the 2011 12 Hours of Sebring in March with a major revision which Audi referred to as 'Evolution 2' but did not compete in the race, which was instead competed by an updated version of the R15 plus. According to Audi, the Evolution 2 revision was 40 kg (88 lb) lighter than the initial specification.

== 2012: R18 ultra and R18 e-tron quattro (RP2) ==
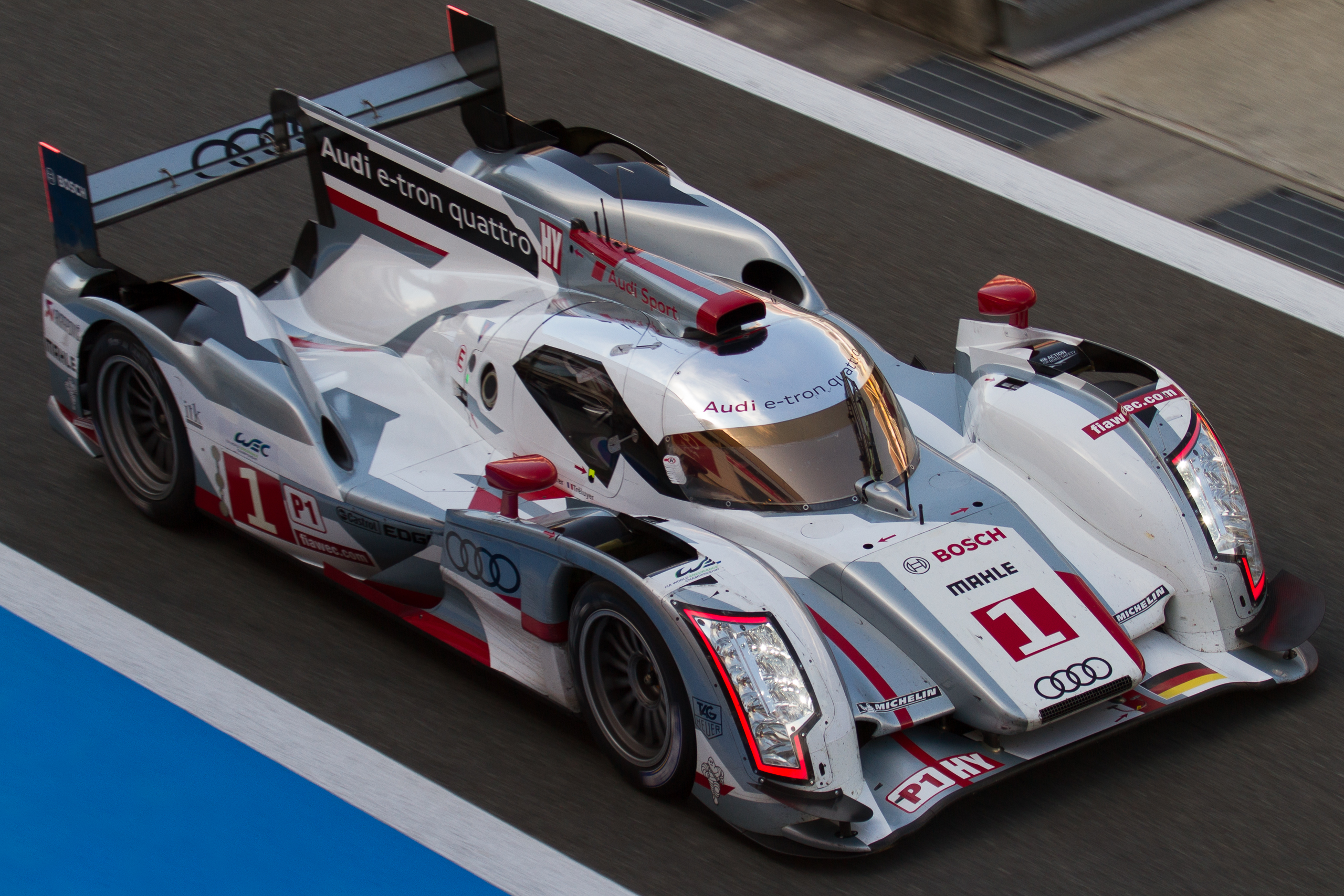
Top view of the Audi R18 e-tron quattro at the 2012 6 Hours of Fuji, driven by André Lotterer

For 2012, Audi introduced a new car called the R18 ultra and R18 e-tron quattro for the non-hybrid and hybrid versions, respectively, which won Le Mans. Both the Ultra and e-tron quattro R18 were run at the 2012 24 Hours of Le Mans. Development of the RP2 began in February 2010.

Both the hybrid and the non-hybrid used the same new chassis, known internally as RP2, which could accommodate an electro-flywheel hybrid system at the front axle. The ultra is identical to the e-tron quattro, except the hybrid system components are removed and replaced with ballast at the same mounting points. To improve visibility, the lack of which contributed to the R18's severe crashes in the 2011 24 Hours of Le Mans, the windows were enlarged and head restraints reworked. An indentation was added to the roof below the engine air intake to feed cleaner air to the engine, resulting in an increase to engine power. Due to the additional weight of the hybrid system, Audi focused on weight reduction, which resulted in the car being 85 kg (187 lb) lighter than the RP1 R18.

The 3.7L turbodiesel engine was designed to accommodate the RP2's hybrid systems, including a compressed-air reservoir hybrid system powered by the turbocharger that could be used to prevent turbo lag, though the system was banned before it was used in competition.

The R18 e-tron quattro's hybrid system consisted of a 150 kW (201 hp; 204 PS) MGU-K electric motor mounted on the front axle within the monocoque, which stored recuperated energy in an electromagnetic mechanical flywheel located in the passenger seat area of the cockpit. The flywheel unit is supplied by the Williams F1 team, which originally designed it but never used it in F1, and consists of a composite flywheel held under vacuum with a maximum speed of 45,000RPM. The electrical energy generated by the MGU-K front motor is transferred to the flywheel unit through wires, which then spins the flywheel using an electromagnetic clutch to store the energy kinetically. The flywheel's energy can later be deployed by converting it into electric energy through the electromagnetic clutch to power the MGU-K front motor, which was only allowed above 120 km/h (75 mph) by regulations. While the hybrid system is deploying, the car has a total of over 700 horsepower (522 kW; 710 PS).

In addition to the changes required by the regulations (reduced air intake restrictor and 60-litre fuel tank) the car was completely reworked to reduce weight. These changes included Xtrac sequential electrically activated 6-speed racing gearbox with gearbox housing made of new carbon-fiber composite with titanium inserts, carbon clutch, changes to the carbon-fiber composite aluminum honeycomb monocoque built by Dallara, single Garrett (Honeywell) turbocharger with boost pressure limited to 280 kPa (40.6 psi) absolute, Bosch MS24 engine management, 1 x 45.8 mm (1.80 in) diameter air restrictor, OZ magnesium forged wheels, Brembo brakes in a Formula 1-style 'cake-tin' housing, and Michelin Radial 360/710R18 front and 370/710R18 rear tires.

== 2013-spec R18 e-tron quattro (RP3) ==
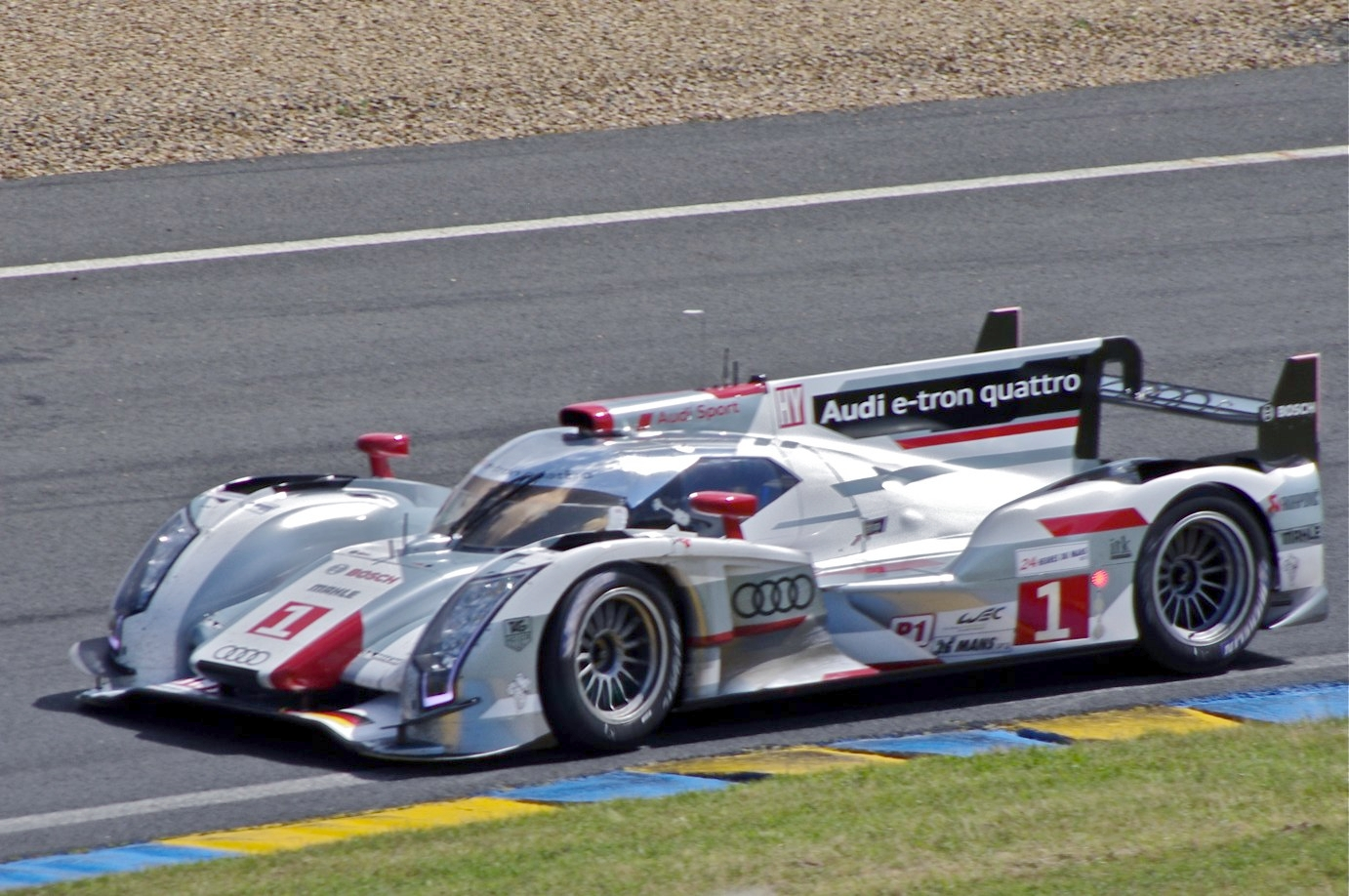
Audi R18 e-tron quattro (Overall & LMP1 class winner, 2012 24 Hours of Le Mans)

The 2013 R18 e-tron quattro is an evolution of the 2012 RP2 R18 e-tron quattro. Though designated RP3, several RP3 monocoques are simply rebadged RP2 chassis, and the crash structure, headlights, suspension, and gearbox were also carried over from the RP2. The RP3 continued to use the same 500 kJ flywheel accumulator system designed by Williams Hybrid Power as the RP2, but the MGU-K motor was replaced by two 74 kW; 100 hp (101 PS) Bosch Motor Generator Units driving the front wheels with water-cooled integrated power electronics, providing the car with four wheel drive (quattro), and a smaller 58-litre fuel tank. The hybrid system, as per the regulations, can only deploy energy at speeds above 120 km/h (75 mph). Unlike the 2012 R18's MGU-K, the upgraded MGU-K could fully charge the flywheel at tracks shorter than the Circuit de la Sarthe; this increase in performance led to Audi dropping the non-hybrid ultra model for 2013 onwards.

Significant aerodynamic changes include the addition of rear wing extensions which exploited a loophole in the regulations, and the addition of a blown diffuser system, which utilizes engine exhaust gasses to block turbulent airflow from the wheels from interfering with the airflow within the rear diffuser; this necessitated the use of a splitter to feed exhaust gasses from the exit of the single turbocharger to a slot adjacent to the inner surface of the rear wheels. The use of off-throttle exhaust blowing, which burns fuel off-throttle to maintain exhaust gas supply to maintain the blown diffuser effect, resulted in the 2013 R18 to consume 21% more fuel to cover only 1.5% more distance than the previous year at the 2013 6 Hours of Silverstone, as noted by media outlets.

The e-tron has six automatic modes that are driver-selectable on the steering wheel. The modes manage engine mapping, short bursts accelerating from corners, quattro four wheel drive, wet weather, etc. Allan McNish said "I don't have to press a button ... It does it automatically ... It is like traction control."

== 2014-spec R18 e-tron quattro (RP4/5) ==
For 2014, Audi introduced an all-new car, internally called the RP4. Unlike previous Audi LMP1 cars, which were designed with help from Dallara, this new version of the R18 was built in cooperation with Italian motorsport engineering firm YCOM.

Changes from 2013 R18 e-tron quattro include the introduction of blue laser beam backlights with a yellow phosphor crystal lens complementing the LED headlights, a revised V6 TDI engine with an electric turbocharger, upgrades to the flywheel accumulator system and an exhaust heat recovery system. The system captures the thermal energy from the exhaust and can add power to either the turbocharger or the flywheel accumulator system. Audi later opted not to race with the second Energy Retrieval System, which is known as a Motor Generator Unit-Heat [MGU-H] in Formula One, because it did not result in the performance gain engineers had hoped for and was therefore considered an unnecessary risk to take. The aerodynamics have been heavily revised in accordance with the new rules: the width is reduced by 10 cm, the height is increased by 20 mm and there are a new set of front wings. The exhaust-blown diffuser on the 2013 model has been banned and removed. The safety monocoque has been strengthened with additional fabric. Wheel tethers and extra crash structures are also added to the car. Finally, there are numerous smaller upgrades to vision and ergonomics to improve drivability.

For 2014, updates to the car, now called the RP5, focused on reducing aerodynamic drag. Notable changes include the removal of the side mirror pods, integrating the mirrors onto the front fender bodywork instead.

== 2016-spec R18 (RP6) ==
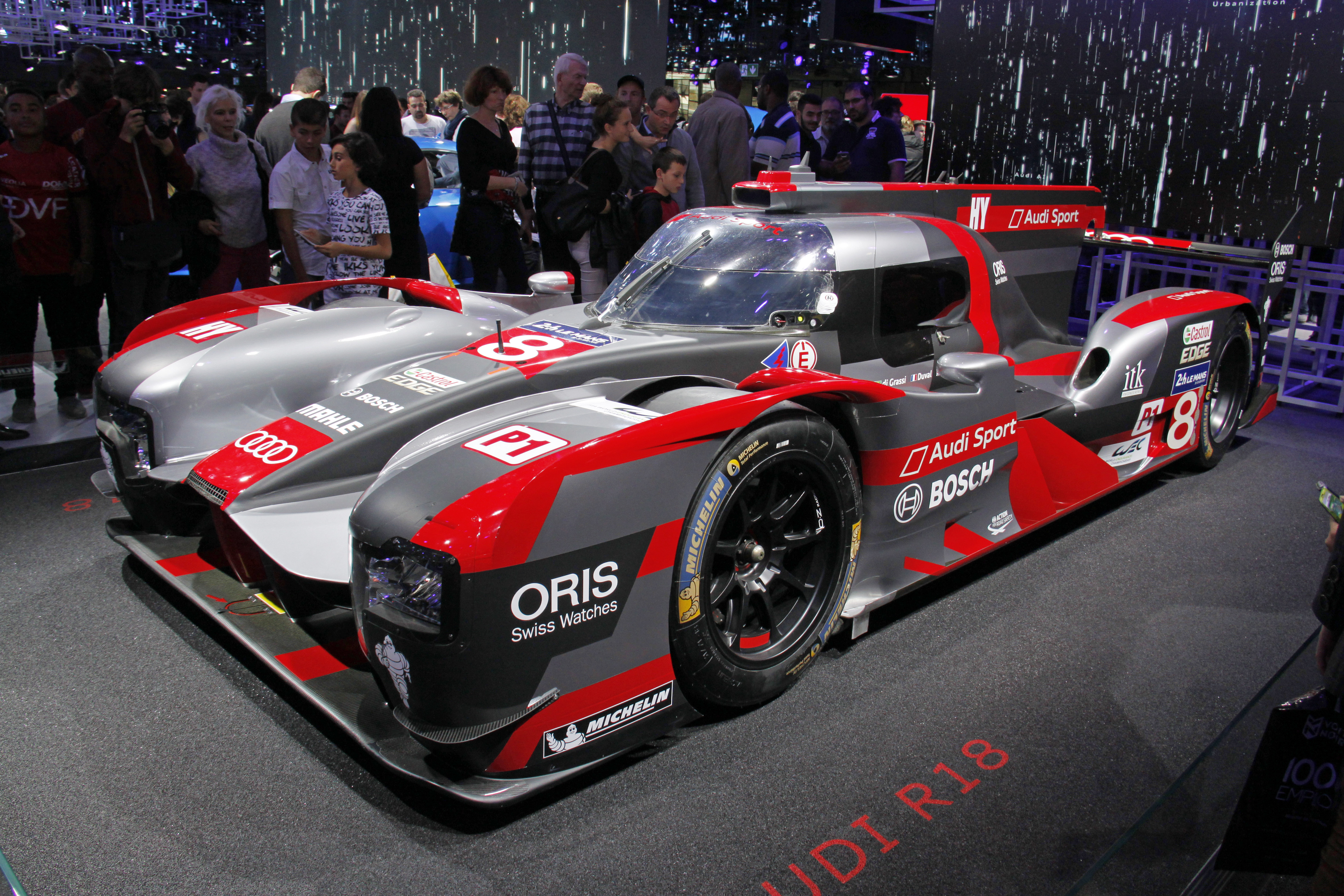
2016-spec Audi R18 at the 2016 Paris Motor Show

On 29 November 2015, Audi Sport debuted the redesigned R18 that the team planned to race in the 2016 FIA World Endurance Championship season. The new R18 featured significantly altered aerodynamics, including a raised nose similar to pre-2014 Formula One nose designs, air scoops above the front fenders, integrated mirrors, and other body modifications. The KERS for the 2016 R18 had also been changed from a flywheel system to a lithium-ion battery, and had been upgraded from the 4 MJ class to the 6 MJ class for additional boost. The engine remained the same 4.0 L turbodiesel V6. Audi dropped the e-tron quattro name badge for the 2016 season.

Audi raced two R18s all across the 2016 WEC season. They finished first at Silverstone; however, an irregularity concerning the underbody of the winning car resulted in post-race disqualification; Audi decided not to dispute this decision. They won at Spa-Francorchamps and Bahrain, and finished third at Le Mans. They finished second in the Manufacturers' Championship.

== Technical data ==
Technical data	R18 TDI (RP1)	R18 ultra (RP2)	R18 e-tron quattro (RP2)	R18 e-tron quattro (RP3)	R18 e-tron quattro (RP4)	R18 e-tron quattro (RP5)	Audi R18 (RP6)
Engine	120° V6 turbodiesel						
Displacement	3.7 L				4.0 L		
Max engine power	540 hp				550 hp		
Valve control	Double overhead camshafts per cylinder bank, 4 valves per cylinder						
Fuel system	Common rail direct injection						
Hybrid system	—		2×75 kW electric motor on the front axle, powered by 500 kJ (0.14 kWh) flywheel KERS; 2MJ		170 kW electric motor on the front axle, powered by 500 kJ (0.14 kWh) flywheel KERS and MGU-H; 2MJ	200 kW electric motor on the front axle, powered by 700 kJ (0.19 kWh) flywheel KERS; 4MJ	350+ kW electric motor on the front axle, powered by lithium-ion batteries; 6MJ
Transmission	6-speed sequential				7-speed sequential		6-speed sequential
Drive	Rear-wheel drive		Part-time all-wheel drive				
Suspension front & rear	Double wishbone, torsion suspension						
Brakes	Ceramic disc brakes						
Chassis & Body	Chassis in aluminium/composite-honeycomb with composite body						
Dry weight (incl. ballast)	900 kg (1,984 lb)				870 kg (1,918 lb)		875 kg (1,929 lb)

== Racing history ==
=== 2011 season ===
The R18 TDI made its race debut at the 2011 1000 km of Spa round of the Intercontinental Le Mans Cup in May, finishing 3rd. Due to developmental and logistic reasons, the R18 did not enter the 2011 12 Hours of Sebring; however, two evolved R18s (chassis numbers 101 and 102) were tested. In the 2011 24 Hours of Le Mans, Allan McNish (car #3) and Mike Rockenfeller's (#1) cars were involved in collisions (both with GTE Ferraris, McNish with #58 and Rockenfeller with #71). The remaining Audi R18 (#2 of Marcel Fässler, André Lotterer and Benoît Tréluyer) went on to win the race by 13.854 seconds. This was the 11th win in the past 13 years for Audi.

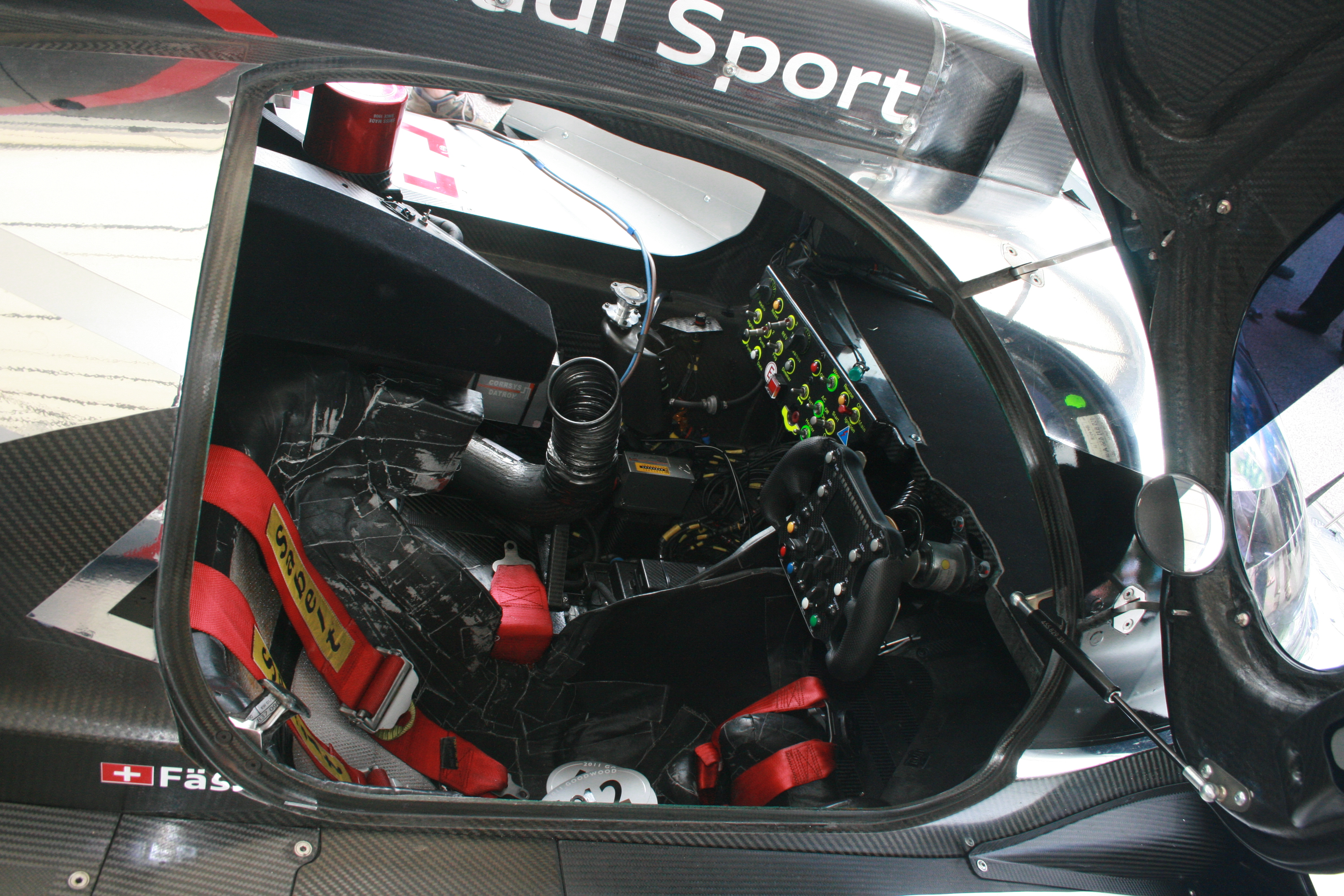
Cockpit of the R18

=== 2012 season ===
Audi competed in the FIA World Endurance Championship (WEC). For the 2012 12 Hours of Sebring, they entered three 2011 R18s; the #2 of McNish, Tom Kristensen and Rinaldo Capello took the overall victory with 325 laps completed, marking Audi's tenth victory at Sebring. The victory also marked Kristensen's sixth Sebring win, and as a three-driver team, the third (2006 and 2009). The #3 car of Timo Bernhard, Romain Dumas and Loïc Duval finished 2nd four laps behind (321); the two ran much of the race in the same lap until the latter stages when the #3 car fell behind pace of the #2 and made contact with another car, causing a lengthy final pit stop for nose repair (besides the refuel). The #1 of the 2011 Le Mans-winning team finished 16th overall and 5th among WEC LMP1 competitors (310); the car was less reliable than the other two, marred by a gearbox issue midway in the race.

Both the Ultra and e-tron Quattro made their racing débuts at the 2012 6 Hours of Spa-Francorchamps as part of a four-car Audi entry in the FIA World Endurance Championship. The #3 car of Romain Dumas, Loïc Duval and Marc Gené gave the Ultra victory over the e-tron Quattro. Audi finished 1–2–3–4 in the race. Audi had entered a four car line-up for Le Mans. The e-tron Quattro finished first and second with the Ultra finishing in third and fifth. The leading car covered 5151.8 km, making 33 pit stops. Audi intended to run one of each model for the remaining five races in the season. Audi has instead run two e-tron Quattros since Bahrain.

=== 2013 season ===
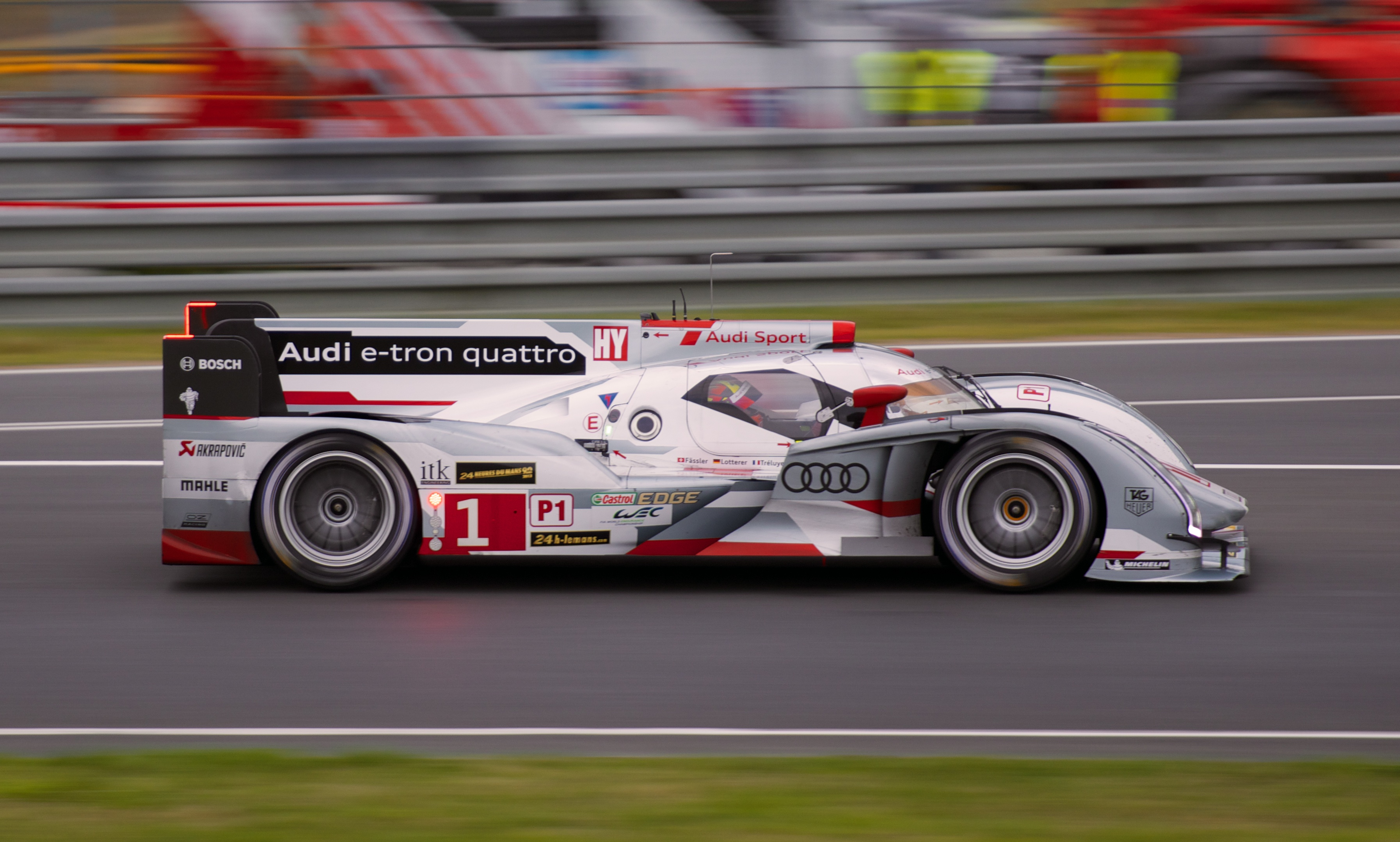
The No. 1 R18 at the 2013 24 Hours of Le Mans

The 2013 season would see Audi utilize the hybrid system completely; retiring the non-hybrid turbodiesel R18 Ultra. The #1 car would be piloted by André Lotterer, Benoît Tréluyer, and Marcel Fässler. The #2 entry would be raced by Tom Kristensen, Allan McNish, and Loïc Duval. Round 1 was the 6 hours of Silverstone. Despite a disappointing qualifying attempt for both entries, with the #2 starting 3rd behind the two rival 2012-spec Toyota TS030 Hybrids and the #1 starting 5th behind a privateer Rebellion Racing Lola B12/60, the race would yield better results, and rather quickly. The #2 led the race with the #1 behind it by the end of the first hour. The #1 would leapfrog the #2 after the end of hour three, but would eventually regain the lead again by the end of hour five, thanks to a solid stint by McNish and the lack of hybrid drive in the #1 car. The #2 car would win the race after battling with its sister car throughout the race, winning an entire lap over Toyota.

The addition of a third entry was prepared by Audi prior to the 6 hours of Spa-Francorchamps. The #3 car would be driven by the Spaniard Marc Gené, Oliver Jarvis, and young Brazilian Lucas Di Grassi. The car would be only eligible to earn manufacturer points in Le Mans. Audi determined to use this car for its Le Mans effort, using the race at Spa as a test bed for both the #3 car and team. A damp practice session would be dominated by the e-tron quattro's and would continue into the dry qualifying session, with cars #1, #3, and #2 (in that order) qualifying a second within each other taking the first three spots. They were a second over a duo of Toyota TS030 Hybrid cars, one being 2013-spec and the other 2012. The race would show Audi's strong pace, but it was neutralized by Toyota's better fuel consumption in its 2013-spec car, making for a very tight race for Audi. However, a mechanical problem in the closest challenging Toyota provided Audi with an easy 1–2–3 finish as the race concluded, with the #1 winning in Belgium.

Entering Le Mans, with victories at Silverstone and Spa-Francorchamps, Audi had a 20-point advantage over Toyota, winning races off of sheer pace. The Le Mans test was dominated by Audi in the order of car #2, #3, and #1. The same result was repeated in the qualifying sessions, with the #2 car setting a time of 3 minutes and 22.349 seconds. During the race, besides a brief overtake of the lead by Toyota by virtue of a pit stop, Audi stood in control of the entire race and #2 took the 24 hour classic's honors, with the other car, #3 finishing third, extending their championship lead. The 6 hours of São Paulo was next on the calendar, and Audi once again showed its pace and just edged its rival Toyota by two tenths. The race was dominated and won by the #1 car, who regained the lead from the end of the second hour until the end of the race after losing the lead briefly in the first hour to Rebellion. The #2 car finished in second place three laps behind the sister car. The championship would move north to Austin, site of the 6 hours of the Circuit of the Americas. Dominant runs in practice and qualifying would place the Le Mans-winning #2 crew on pole position ahead of its sister car the #1, which followed behind three tenths off the pace. The race would prove to be a worthy challenge for Audi by their rivals Toyota. By the end of hour 1, the #2 car sat in second place behind the lone Toyota machine and the #1 car in fourth behind the Rebellion Racing entry, one lap down from the lead. However, during hour two until the end of three, the #2 car regained the lead, being followed closely by the Toyota in second. At the end of hour 4, the #2 would slip back to second, but would eventually battle back to win the race, twenty-three seconds ahead of their rival Toyota.

The 6 hours of Fuji in the 2013 season would be the shortest race in FIA WEC history. Despite Audi qualifying the #1 car on pole and #2 car in fourth position, the race would only last eight total green flag laps, which started under safety car due to heavy rain. The Audi #1 would pit for service in response to the weather, and in turn Toyota passed it and led until the race was stopped and called. However, the #2 car would finish third. The championship would then visit China for the 6 hours of Shanghai. The practice sessions would be very competitive, and although the Audi prototypes lead both practices, they were being closely matched for pace by Toyota. In qualifying, the #1 car would settle for second and the #2 for fourth respectively. The race would play out as the tale of two halves, with #1 and #2 both by the end of the third hour being one lap down to the leader. However, by the end of hour five, the #1 made back a lap and found itself 30 seconds off the lead. The #1 car's pace would pay off at the end and resulted in a fifteen-second victory over the second-place Toyota TS030 hybrid. The season would conclude with the 6 hours of Bahrain, and Audi would not dominate as they did for the majority of the season. The #1 car started the race in third and the #2 in fourth. The #1 would finish second place and the #2 would retire due to mechanical issues. Despite the result, Audi would still win the manufacturer's title by sixty-four and a half points. The season for Audi's R18 e-tron quattro would be defined as a season that Audi won as a result of fast race pace and good consistency.

=== 2014 season ===
Audi would evolve the R18 e-tron quattro into an entirely new and different looking car from its revised 2013 predecessor to adapt to the changes that the new LMP1 regulations (for hybrids) presented. A larger 4.0 L engine (producing over 400 kW (540 bhp)) would power the rear of the car and one MGU hybrid system (producing over 170 kW (230 hp)) would operate in the front axle of the car. A flywheel capable of storing over 600 kJ of energy would be inside the car as well. An ERS-K (to store kinetic energy) and ERS-H (to store energy generated from heat) would also be included within the platform of the electric turbocharged engine. As for the aerodynamics, Audi switched the chassis constructor from Dallara to YCOM. The car became smaller in width and taller in height. The newly built monocoque was made bigger and more layered on the outside for safety purposes; to withstand higher loads during a collision. Wheel tethers (two per wheel) were prescribed by the regulations for safety purposes, attached to the outer wheel suspensions. The front two wheels had tethers attached to the monocoque and the rear wheels to the chassis structure.

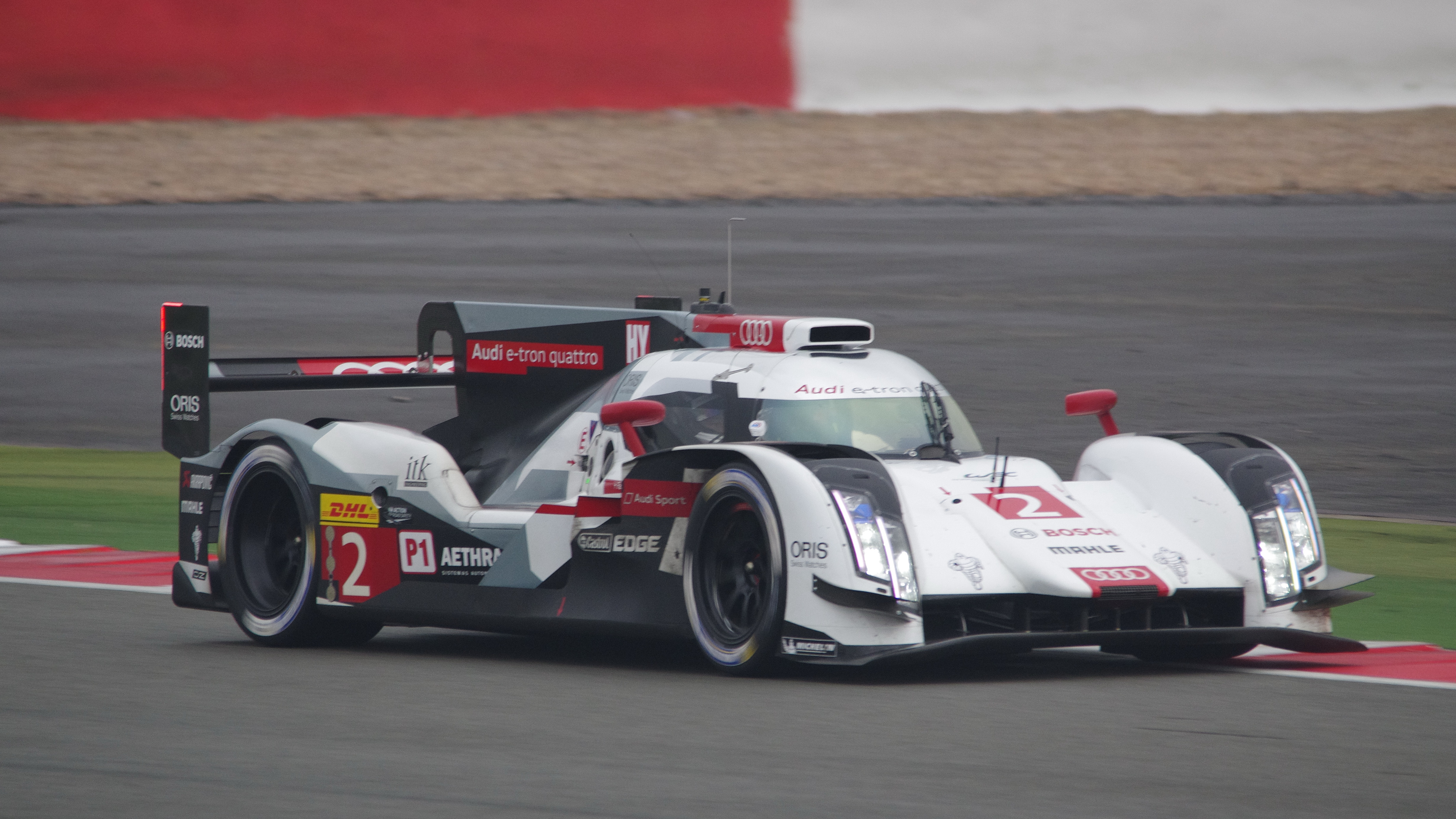
The No. 2 R18 at the 6 Hours of Silverstone

Silverstone was the first race on the 2014 calendar, and in addition to the competition presented by Toyota and their brand new car, the TS040 Hybrid, and Audi's sister company Porsche returned to prototype racing with the 919 Hybrid prototype racer. For practice one, Audi respectively sat in second and fourth, but by the second practice session the #1 and #2 car led the entire field, with the #1 ahead of the #2 by four-tenths flat and the #2 ahead of the nearest competitor by five-tenths. However, by the end of qualifying practice the #1 and #2 were in the same places that they finished by the end of the first practice, the #1 in second and the #2 in fourth. The rainy weather would play a significant role in the result of the race, and it did not favor Audi. Di Grassi's #1 lost traction and crashed in the first hour while leading the race at Woodcote, resulting in suspension damage that would be terminal to the #1 car's chances of finishing the race. That left the #2 Audi to survive the remaining five hours, in fourth place, one lap down behind two Toyotas and a Porsche in that order. By the end of hour two, the #2 Audi had slipped behind the Rebellion Racing, entry three laps down. The car would pass the Rebellion by the end of hour three. By the end of hour 4, the #2 would be completely out of the race after Benoît Tréluyer crashed the car into the wall and trapped it in the gravel. Both cars would finish non-classified and would gain no points in the event. In addition to the disappointing start to the season of earning no points, the cars were damaged so terribly, that new cars would have to be completely re-built.

At Spa-Francorchamps, the first practice session had the #1 leading the field, #2 in fourth place, and #3 in seventh. In the next session, the #2 would be the best of the cars in third place. Qualifying would be a little more difficult. The #2 was the only car that started inside the top three in third position, about a second off the pace of the leading Porsche. Car #2 qualified sixth and car #3 qualified seventh. The race got underway under clear conditions and during the first hour it was very close amongst Audi and its rivals Toyota and Porsche. By the end of the first hour, the #2 and #1 stood in the middle of the LMP1 fray, third and fourth respectively, with the #3 car hanging onto sixth position. During hour two, rivals Toyota leaped two positions to take fourth and third away from the Audis. The #1 car also passed the #2. By the end of hour two cars #1, #2, and #3 stood in positions fourth, fifth, and sixth. By the end of hour four, the #1 was the only car on the lead lap in second place, while #3 was in fifth and #2 in sixth third one lap down. By the end of the race, #1 claimed second place. #2 came in fifth one lap down and #3 brought it home in sixth two laps down.

A win at Le Mans placed Audi in prime position to overtake Toyota in Austin, at the 6 hours of Circuit of the Americas. The first practice session took place in overcast and cool weather. The #2 finished the first practice session first, and the #1 finished the session right behind the #2, two tenths off the pace. Practice session two was run under wet track conditions, and this time the Toyota got the upper hand, taking the first and third positions. The Audi cars finished the wet sessions with the #1 in second place and the #2 in fourth place. For the third and final practice session, the #1 car set the fastest lap, not just in this session, but the entire practice sessions, driven by Duval. The #2 would follow up behind the #1 car in second place, about seven-tenths off the pace. Qualifying was next up and Toyota would set the fastest time average between their two drivers in one of their TS040 Hybrids. Both Porsche machines qualified second and third. This left Audi having to settle for fourth, its fastest car being the #2, and the #1 being behind the #2 and the second of the Toyotas in sixth. The race got underway in hot, dry and clear conditions. As the Toyota built a lengthy lead in the first hour, both the Audi cars would make moves, passing both the Porsche 919 Hybrids. Weather would soon take its toll on a particular part of the track (turn 11) and the drivers in the second hour, and pit strategy played an important role in who would come out of the rain unaffected. Audi chose to pit in both their e-tron Quattros, changing from racing slicks to rain tires. Porsche pitted for new racing slicks and Toyota chose to be brave and try and out last the drenched track. As the Toyotas and Porsches struggled to adjust to the rain that their lack of grip slicks gave them, Audi came out of the storm on top, with one of the Porsches trailing them. Both Toyota TS040 Hybrids ended up swallowing their pride; they lost a lap being trapped in the gravel while the leading Audis lapped them. The Toyota hybrids were able to continue after being rescued by safety marshals. By the end of the third hour, the Porsche trailing the lead Audi in hour two led the race. Between the end of the third hour and fifth, the Porsche continued to lead, and the #2 switched positions with the #1 going into the final hour, as Audi was on a mission to take the lead away from the Porsche, which led by a little over three seconds. Fortunes would soon swing in the way of the Audi within the last hour. The leading Porsche would soon fall off the pace and lose the lead from a lack of engine power, and the duo of #2 and #1 (who was about a minute back), swarmed the Porsche and took the lead and second position. Audi would go on to take the first two podium positions, with #2 winning and #1 in second place. Audi gained the manufacturers championship lead after this race, leading by 18 over rival Toyota.

Oyama, Shizuoka Prefecture, Japan's Fuji Speedway was host to the 6 Hours of Fuji as the season moved onto the fifth round. Now holding the manufacturers lead, Audi hoped to continue the success and fight it showed in Austin. The first two practice sessions got the race weekend off to a great start, as the #1 locked the first position and the #2 took the second position through the first and second practices. However, in the third practice, both of Toyota's and Porsche's prototypes earned faster times than the #1 and #2, who in contrast to the first two practices, sat at the opposite end of the LMP1-H leaderboard. The same result from the third practice session stood for the qualifying session for the LMP1-H field, except the position of the #1 and #2, who switched starting grid positions, with the #2 starting fifth and the #1 starting sixth. The pole position belonged to Toyota. The race got off to an exciting start, with multiple position swaps amongst the LMP1-H cars. By the end of the first hour, the #2 car gained one position, passing one of the Porsches. The #1 stayed in sixth position. When the third hour concluded, Audi switched positions, with the #1 in fourth place and the #2 going down one lap in sixth place. Eventually, by the end of the race, the #1 Audi lost a lap and soon was passed by the second of the Porsches, moving the #1 back to fifth. The #1 would finish fifth and #2 would finish sixth, the #1 being two laps down and the #2 being three laps down on the leading Toyota TS040 Hybrid. Audi attempted to double stint the tires during the race. The pit strategy did not help their cause, as grip came at a premium during the race, and that strategy cost them a lot of time. Audi only earned 18 points in Fuji, and with Toyota claiming pole position and finishing first and second, they would gain 43 points and leap ahead of Audi by eight points in the manufacturers championship.

The championship would stay in Asia for the next round in Shanghai, China for the 6 Hours of Shanghai. The first practice was held on a wet track, and #2 ended the session third and the #1 finished the session fourth. Both cars obtained laps within the 1 minute and 52 second range, separated by a little over three and a half hundredths. The second practice took place on a wet track as well, and the Audis switched positions, with the #1 ending the session in third and the #2 finished in fourth place. Their lap times decreased to the 1 minute and 50 second range, separated by around five-tenths. Much of the same weather conditions from the first two practices were present in the third practice, and the #1 finished the session in fourth and the #2 finished in sixth position. In the first two of the practice sessions, Toyota led and in the last practice, Porsche led. For the qualifying session, Audi found themselves at the back of the hybrid starting grid, the #1 being fifth place and #2 sitting in sixth. The start of the race would be dry and in comparison to the previous practices and qualifying sessions, there would not be rain in the forecast for the remainder of the six-hour session. The first hour would see both the Audis be very competitive, with the #2 car placing in third with the #1 closely following in fourth. The Porsches had the first two positions. By the end of the second hour, both Audi cars moved back a position each, the #2 car in fourth and the #1 in fifth. At the end of hour three, both cars were lapped by the fast-paced Toyota, and, in the end, the #2 car could not catch the Porsche in third position, who was on the same lap. The #2 kept losing time to the Porsche in third ever since the end of the fourth hour. The #2 would finish fourth place and the #1 would finish in fifth. Toyota would lock the top two spots and win the race.

The southwest Asian nation of Bahrain would host the 6 Hours of Bahrain at Bahrain International Circuit for the penultimate round of the 2014 season. Two of Toyota's drivers, Anthony Davidson and Sébastien Buemi in the #8 Toyota TS040 Hybrid had the ability to clinch the drivers' championship with a position of fifth place or better or the #2 Audi finishing lower than first place. The #2 car's driver crew was second place, and they would need a very solid finish and the #8 car to finish last in the LMP1-H standings after the race concluded. The first practice result had both of the Audi cars toward the back end of the class field, with the #1 car in fourth place and the #2 car in fifth, in between the set of Porsche prototypes. The second practice was very much like the first in terms of the #1 and #2 cars positioning. In the third practice session, the #2 only participated, and placed fourth. In qualifying, the #2 posted a time of a 1-minute 44.792 lap, positioning it fifth. The #1 did not partake in qualifying, and by default, they started last in the LMP1 grid. In the race, Audi would find pace, particularly with their #2 car, as Lotterer set the best lap in the first hour at 1 minute 46.388 seconds, positioned in fourth place by the conclusion of the first hour. The second hour would see the lap time lower to a 1-minute and 46.126-second lap by the #2 car as well as a position gain by one position, to third. The #1 car's position was fifth place, one lap down by the end of the second hour. By the end of the fourth hour, the rapid pace by the #2 dissolved, and now the car dropped to fourth, one lap down. Behind was the sister car, also one lap down. The #1 car set the second-fastest lap behind its sister car, the #2, of a lap time of 1 minute and 46.142 seconds. However, it lost another lap during this hour. The two cars' positioning would not change for the rest of the race. Audi, although setting faster laps than the rest of the LMP1 field for the first time during a race in the season would struggle to run consistent lap times. In addition, the Audi #2 finished too low; and did not earn enough points, giving Anthony Davidson and Sébastien Buemi in the #8 Toyota TS040 Hybrid the drivers' championship title in the penultimate round of the season.

The finale of the 2014 FIA World Endurance Championship would be at the famous Brazilian circuit Autódromo José Carlos Pace for the 6 Hours of São Paulo. This would be Audi #1's Tom Kristensen's last race as a race car driver as well. The first practice made for a promising start for the #1 car, as it placed third by the end of the first practice. The #2 car was fifth in the first practice, behind one of the Toyotas. Consistent with the first practice, the #1 car would finish the session in third again while the #2 improved on its positioning by one spot to be placed fourth. In the third practice, the Audi's would place at the back of the hybrid field with the #2 car fifth and the #1 sixth. Qualifying placed the Audis toward the back of the LMP1-H grid, as out of the six cars, the #2 qualified fourth and the #1 qualified sixth. Early on in the running of the race, the #1 looked to move up the order against its rivals in the first hour and placed in fourth by the end of the hour. The #2 was sixth by the end of the first hour. By the second hour, the #1 attempted to threaten for the lead of the race, ending the hour off in second place. The #2 still remaining in sixth. The #1 car would move back to fourth by hour four and the #2 car remained in sixth. By the end of the fifth hour, both cars moved up the order, the #1 in third and the #2 in fourth. The finale of the season concluded with the #1 car taking a podium position in third and the #2 car settle back to fifth. Porsche won the race, their first of the season. All throughout the race Audi brought a significant challenge to get both of their cars on the podium, particularly the #1. Toyota would finish the season not only with the drivers title, but with the manufacturers' title as the Toyota TS040 Hybrid proved to be the best overall LMP1-H during the season, combining speed, reliability, and solid fuel efficiency to consistently produce good results for the majority of the rounds.

=== 2015 season ===
Audi would revise their R18 e-tron quattro. Audi chose to upgrade the prototype to the 4 MJ hybrid output class from the 2 MJ. Although the 2015-spec car is a car that resembles the previous year's model, the aerodynamics been altered. The new aerodynamic package allowed for airflow through and around the front end, through the side panels, and at the rear of the car with the diffuser. The monocoque remains unchanged from last year, but except for a modified sidepod airflow with new radiator configurations in the monocoque structure to not only aid in necessary engine cooling, but to cut down on the drag created from the openings. The engine cover at the rear of the car is slimmer, so the car can cut through the air more efficiently. The headlights have been updated with Audi's Matrix LED and Laserlight technologies. With the increased megajoule output, the electrical hybrid machine in the front axle produced 203 kW (272 bhp), which recovers energy during braking. The flywheel (in the passenger side of the car) can store up to 700 kilojoules of energy. The 4.0 liter V6 engine has been further developed to produce 416 kW (558 bhp), with better-optimized fuel consumption, despite a reduction in the regulations for a lower fuel capacity. The prototype weighs in at 870 kg.

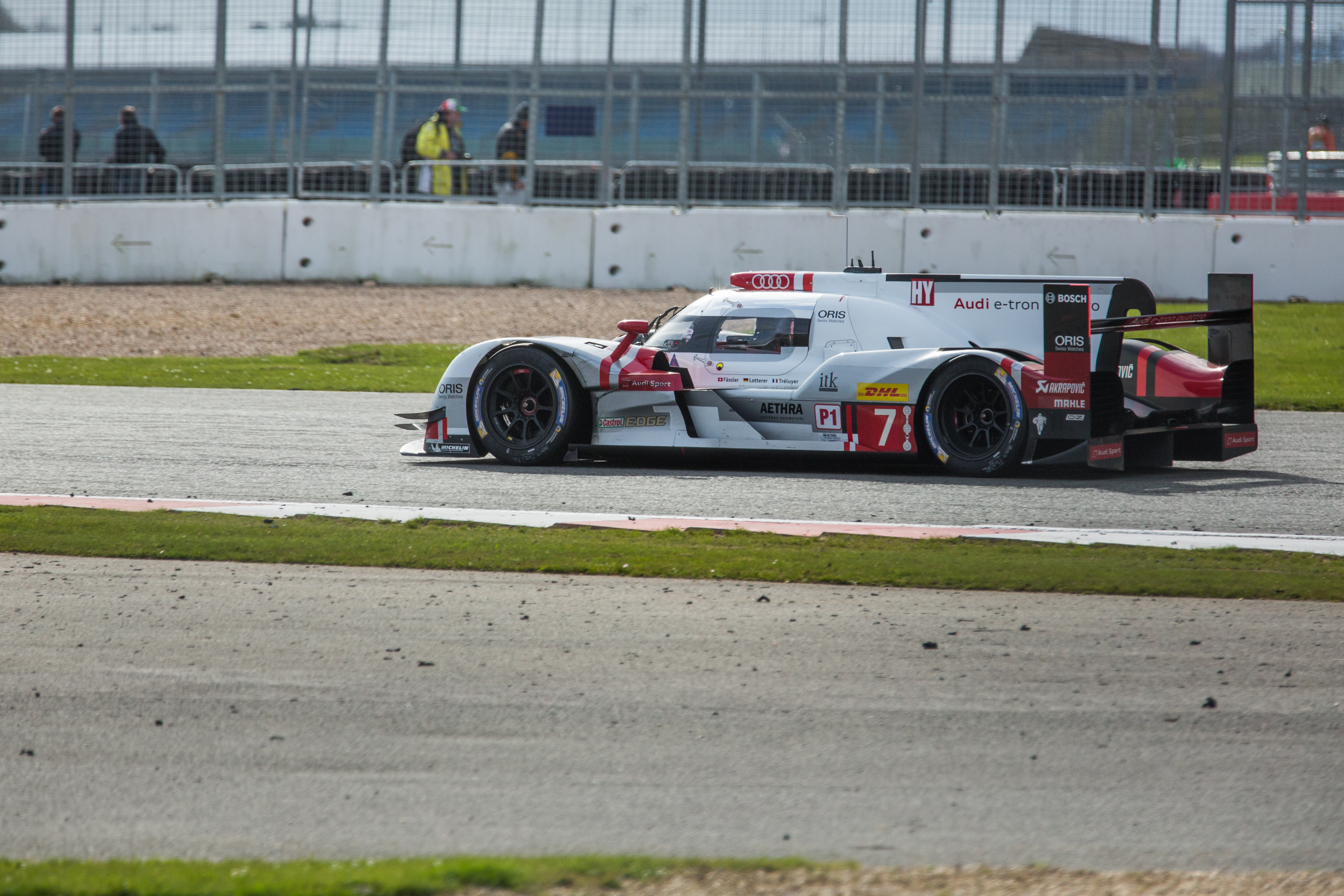
The No. 7 car took the victory at the season-opening 6 Hours of Silverstone

The season started once again at Silverstone Circuit, on the traditional grand prix layout for the 6 Hours of Silverstone. Toyota had brought a revised version of the successful TS040 Hybrid that won them both the drivers' and manufacturers' championships in the 2014 FIA WEC season. Porsche, newcomers to the FIA WEC in 2014, have also updated their prototype, most notably moving their prototype to the 8MJ class. In the first practice, the Audi #8 topped the time sheets setting 1 minute 42.121 second lap. The other Audi, #7 finished the practice in third place, separated by a Porsche and a time difference of about two tenths. Audi had even a better result in free practice two, with the #7 leading and the #8 in second position. A wet third practice had the Audis separated, on opposite end of the LMP1-H leaderboard. The #7's result was first and the #8 was sixth. For all the rounds except Le Mans, in all car categories the times for the top two fastest drivers were averaged together, and the car grid was set by fastest time based on the fastest duos first. For the qualifying run, the #8 qualified third behind the two Porsches with a time of 1 minute and 40.352 second average time and the #7 qualifying fifth. The race started under partly cloudy skies, with the air temperature at 12 °C (54 °F). Through the first hour, the #7 was in fourth and the #8 was in fifth. During the second hour, the #8 car sustained rear chassis damage from a GTE AM car, which resulted in a lost lap in the pits for repair, dropping from third place to fifth. With four hours and twenty-six minutes to go, the #7 and the rival leading Porsche #18 were battling for overall lead of the race. The battle was briefly halted by both cars pitting in for service, but after all the cars in the race pitted, the battle between the two resumed for the overall lead. The battle would continue to rage on throughout the race, with clean and professional racing between the two rival prototypes and back markers along the way. While the battle between the #7 and #18 continued, the #8 gained time on the two upfront as it aimed to get back on the lead lap. By the end of hour four, the #7 lead the race, and the #8 was situated in fifth, five laps down. The standings with two hours and fifteen minutes to go had the #7 Audi still leading the field with a Toyota and the #18 Porsche behind it. The #8 Audi was still in fifth place, four laps down. Heading into the last hour, the #7 and #18 battled it out once again, before being separated with the Porsche pitting. With fifteen minutes to go in the race, the leading #7 Audi received a timed stop and go penalty, right after heading into the pits the previous lap. Meanwhile, the #18 Porsche decreased the gap more and more. Going into the final lap, the gap between the #7 Audi and the #18 Porsche was just under six seconds. When the six hours elapsed, the #7 Audi was on top of the standings and winning the race by about four and a half seconds over the second place #18 Porsche. In third was the #1 Toyota, about fifteen seconds back. The #8 Audi finished fifth place, three laps down.

After securing a hard-fought win in Silverstone, the championship moved onto Spa-Francorchamps for the 6 Hours of Spa-Francorchamps. The first practice was run under wet conditions, and it slowed the pace of the track greatly, as the fastest time set was by the #18 Porsche of a 2-minute and 16.616 lap time. The fastest Audi was the #9, setting a 2-minute 20.337 lap in the wet, placing it fifth place in the results. The #8 car placed sixth and the #7 placed eighth. Wet track conditions would continue into the next practice session as well. Audi chose to send one car out for the second practice session, that being the #9 Audi. The car placed fifth by the end of the session with a 2-minute and 28 second lap time. As of these two practices, the Porsche 919 Hybrid's finished leading both sessions by the end. The third practice, however, would be dry, and that's when Audi took advantage of a faster racetrack. The #7 ended the third practice on top with a 1-minute and 57.368 second lap time. The #8 car was stuck in the middle of the field in fifth place trailing the Audi and the three Porsches ahead. The #9 was the last of the hybrid prototypes in eighth. In qualifying, the three Porsches locked down the first three starting grid positions, with the fastest of them averaging a 1-minute and 54.767 second lap time. The fastest Audi was the #7 car averaging a 1-minute and 55.540 second lap time to place in fourth. The #8 qualified fifth and the #9 qualified eighth. On race day, the rain held up to a temperature of 13 °C (55 °F), and out the rolling start formation, the positioning of the LMP1-H field changed quickly. The #7 Audi would get as high as third place on the first lap. The #8 would lose a position to the #2 Toyota, but soon regain the position back. Thirty minutes into the first hour, and reminiscent of the last round, the #7 Audi and #18 Porsche battled again, this time for second place up to this point in the race. However, a mistake by the #7 sent the car spinning at the bus stop chicane, dropping the #7 to fourth place behind the #8. The #9 car would be in seventh place. This was how the positioning for first hour would end for the Audis. By the end of the second hour, Audi would press on and promote their positions, as the #7 reached second place, the #8 was following behind in third, and the #9 car gained two positions and was now up to fifth. The third hour would again feature the #18 Porsche and the #7 Audi setting fast laps at the front of the field. However, the #18 would start to increase its lead as the third hour continued. The #9 was in an intense battle with the #2 Toyota for fourth position. The third hour ended with the #7 still chasing down the #18 Porsche in second place followed by the #8 in third. The #9 was in seventh, one lap down. When hour five concluded, the #7 Audi was leading the race, with the #18 Porsche only eight seconds off the lead. The #9 went up to fourth position, two laps down, and the #8 was five laps down in eighth position. Towards the end of the race, pit strategy would play a role in determining the outcome of the race. Although the #7 was passed by the #18 on the Kemmel Straight with forty-five minutes to go, the Porsche soon took a pit stop for fuel only. Audi would react to the pit stop by leaving the #7 out for a few more laps until pitting in on lap 164 for fuel only, with the gap between the #7 and the #18 at fifty seconds. The #7 Audi would go onto win the race by thirteen seconds over the rival #18 Porsche. The #9 would finish the race in fourth, two laps down and the #8 would finish in seventh place, eight laps down. So far in the season for manufacturers' points, Audi held a seventeen-point advantage over Porsche, led by pace and strategy, which resulted in victories.

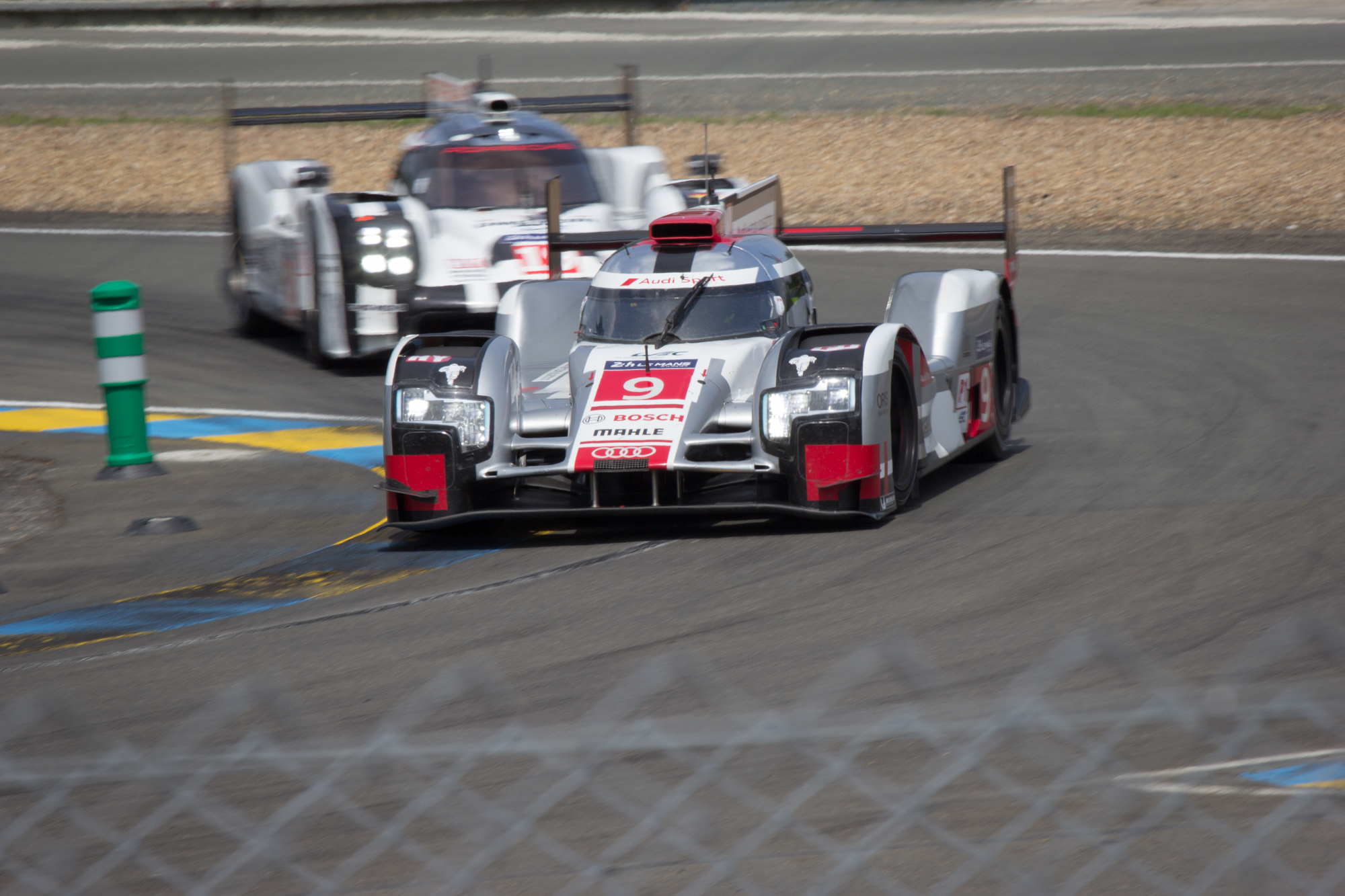
The No. 9 R18 leads the No. 19 Porsche 919 during the 2015 24 Hours of Le Mans

The eighty-third annual 24 Hours of Le Mans would be the next round of the 2015 season. Audi would have to compete with one more new competitor in Nissan Motorsports, who, after months of delay, had brought a trio of LMP1-H cars. However, they would prove to be largely ineffective at challenging any of the LMP1 field, due to a failed hybrid system. The #9 car in testing set the fastest lap of all the Audi prototypes during the first test day of a 3-minute and 22.307-second lap to be on pace for second place, three tenths off the leading #18 Porsche. On test day two the #7 Audi was the fastest Audi in the field, setting a 3-minute and 22.556 second lap time, placing it third behind two Porsche prototypes. When the race week started with the first practice, every Audi finished in the top six, with the #8 placing in second, setting a lap of 3 minutes and 21.950 seconds. The #7 placed in fifth and the #9 placed sixth. There were three qualifying sessions to form the grid for the race. The best lap for each car during each of the qualifying sessions would average to determine each car's starting position. In the first qualifying practice, the Porsches locked out the top three positions, with the best Porsche, #18 setting a 3-minute and 16.887 lap. All the Audi prototypes would be seconds back off the pace, sitting in positions fourth through sixth, the fastest Audi being the #7 setting a lap in the 3 minute and 19 second range. The pace would significantly decrease for qualifying practice two, as the #7 Audi set a lap of a 3-minute and 20.561-second lap to place second behind the leading Porsche by a difference of 1 second and sixth tenths. The #8 and #9 would place fifth and sixth. For the final qualifying practice, two of the Audis were able to top the speedy Porsches, with the #7 and #9 placing first and second. The #8 Audi placed sixth. The average time of the Audi would be for the #8, 3 minutes and 19.866 seconds, the #7, 3 minutes and 20.571 seconds, and the #9, 3 minutes and 20.997 seconds. They would take the grid third, fourth, and fifth. The start of the race was sunny with track temperatures ranging from 23 to 25 °C (73 to 77 °F). In the first hour, the #7, #8, #9 were able to get by the #19 Porsche that started third. Twenty minutes into the race, with the aid of slower cars, the #8 and #7 were both able to reach the second place #18 Porsche and challenge for the position. Meanwhile, the #9 fell behind the #19 Porsche. By the end of the first hour, Audi had positions third through fifth, and all top six runners were separated by no more than eight seconds. A safety car came out at the beginning of the second hour so track marshals could clean an oily track, but as soon as the track was declared green, the close racing between the Porsches and the Audis resumed. At the end of the hour, the #7 led the race, using the traffic to get ahead of the three Porsches ahead. The #9 and #8 sat fifth and sixth respectively. In the fifth hour, #9 Audi driven by Filipe Albuquerque managed to set a race lap record on the Sarthe circuit of a 3-minute and 17.647 lap, and the pace continued to place himself second by the end of the hour with the #7 behind. As the sun began to set over the track in the seventh hour, the #9 was able to pass the #17 Porsche on raw pace after a pit stop, and the #7 followed in third. By the end of hour ten, the Porsche would regain the lead over the #7 and #9 in second and third places. Entering the eleventh hour, the gap between the #19 Porsche and #7 would come down after the #19 Porsche pitted and by lap 161, they were nose to tail. Through pitstops, the #19 Porsche was able to keep its lead over the two Audis trailing in second and third. The #8 was in fifth, one lap down. Through the midway point hour, the #19 Porsche had a sixty-five second lead over the #7 Audi, with the #9 fifty seconds back. Fifteen minutes into the twelfth hour, the #19 Porsche pitted in, handing the lead over to the #7. When the #19 rejoined the track, the #7 led by five seconds. About ten minutes later, the #7 made a pit stop. By the end of the thirteenth hour, four cars were on the lead lap, and that included the #7 in second and #9 in third. In the sixteenth hour, on the run to the Ford Chicane, the #7 lost its engine cover, and by the time the car pitted, with the time it lost already from the drag it carried, it was sent in the garage for short repairs. When the car returned, it was in fifth place, two laps down. The #9 would stay in contention for the lead in second place. The race would continue to wear on Audi as it neared its conclusion. In the twenty-first hour, the #9 Audi would be wheeled into the garage to fix a mechanical problem, and would lose three laps by the end of the hour, placing it fourth, between the #7 which was one lap down in third and the #8 three laps down in fifth. The #7 Audi driven by André Lotterer at the time set a new race lap record (at the time, which was eventually broken in 2019) of 3 minutes and 17.476 seconds. When the race concluded, the #19 Porsche won the race, and the #17 finishing second. The #7 would be the only Audi on the podium, finishing third, two laps down. The #8 and #9 would complete the race as well, in fourth, three laps down and seventh, eight laps down. The result would place Porsche in the lead in the manufacturers' points championship, with a lead of sixteen points over Audi.

For the 6 Hours of Nürburgring, the EoT (Equivalence of Technology) in regards to fuel flow for the LMP1 class was altered, and as a consequence, the e-tron quattro received an additional 0.5 kg/h of fuel flow to its V6 engine powerplant and a 0.5-litre reduction in fuel tank capacity from 53.7 to 54.2 litres. The first practice session of the race week was affected by weather in the area. That did not stop Audi from setting the pace during the first session of the week. The #7 set a 1:39.201 to lead the field, and the #8 had the third-fastest time. Repeating the result from the first practice, the #7 ended up back on top at the end of a dry second practice. The #8 finished fourth. During the last practice, Porsche set the fastest laps of any of the practice sessions and took the top two spots. The #8 and #7 finished third and fourth respectively, decreasing on their times in comparison to the first two practices. Porsche did not waste any time setting pace within the qualifying session, with both cars times being in the low 1:36 range. Audi could only manage laps in the 1:37 range and just as the third practice, the #8 was third and the #7 was fourth. The race day was hot and humid, with a track temperatures of 37 °C (99 °F) and air temperatures of 29 °C (84 °F). The start of the race got off to a rather easy start, with the Porsche gaining an early grasp of the lead of the race, as the leading Porsche had a four-second advantage within the first five laps. A full course yellow would slow the field up and bunch the leading LMP1 cars. Audi was presented with an opportunity to regain the lead of the race. Initially, through traffic, the Audis struggled to keep pace with the Porsches. By the end of the first hour, the #7 sat in second and the #8 sat in fourth, both cars behind Porsches. By the beginning of the second hour, Audi would struggle to match the Porsche's pace and the #7 dropped back to third and the #8 still in fourth. As the hour went on the Audi cars would pickup more and more consistent speed. By the end of the third hour, Audi would make up ground and the #7 would find itself in second place and the #8 in third. This position for both the Audis would last until the end of hour five, with the second of the Porsches racing the #8 hard to gain third. Going into the last hour is where Audi began to lose its advantage of the two podium spots it claimed, as the pace of the Porsches increased, and the second of the Porsches got second place. The race would finish with the #7 in third and the #8 in fourth.

The 6 Hours of Circuit of the Americas was the next race on the calendar and the first race in North America for the season. The first free practice session was battled out at record-setting paces for both Audi and Porsche. The fastest time for a LMP1 around the track was set in the first practice session by Porsche, setting a 1:47.231 (at the time). The #8 finished the practice session in third place behind the second of the Porsches in second and the #7 finished the session last in the hybrid class, having to cut the practice short due to alternator issues. The second practice session took place at night, with the #8 claiming second in the session standings and the #7 taking the fourth position. In the final practice session, both Audis were behind both Porsches, with the #8 in third and the #7 in fourth. The result from the final practice would follow into the qualifying session, with the #8 and #7 placing third and fourth on the starting grid. The race was a hot one, with track temperatures at 41 °C (106 °F) and 34 °C (93 °F). From the first to the end of the third hour of the first hour, #8 and #7 remained in the same positions they started in, third and fourth. In the fourth hour, the #8 went to second place briefly before a pit stop infringement pushed the car back to fourth, and the #7 car was promoted to second by the end of the fourth hour. At the end of the fifth hour, the #8 and #7 were in third and fourth, but were down a lap off the lead Porsches. In the last hour, the #7 passed the #8 and a garage visit by one of the Porsches moved both Audis up one position and the #7 finished second and #8 finished third.

The next round was the 6 Hours of Fuji. Audi chose to race with a revised chassis package for this race. The #7 was the fastest during the first practice and the #8 finished third fastest in the opening practice. The Porsche would rebound in the second practice, edging out the #7 Audi by about four-tenths. The #8 placed fourth. In the third practice session, the #7 placed third and the #8 placed fourth, with the #8 spending most of the time in the garage with a gearbox issue. During the qualifying session, the #7 settled in the third slot. The #8 sat about two tenths away from the #7 car in fourth place. The race got underway in wet conditions, with the safety car leading the field when the race timer started. The track temperature was at 17 °C (63 °F) and the air temperature at 15 °C (59 °F). After forty minutes, the race went green and the #7 took the lead immediately, ahead of the Porsches. At the end of the hour, the #7 and #8 took advantage of the wet conditions, placing first and second. By the end of the second hour, the #7 placed first and the #8 in fourth, both cars having taken a pit stop. The third hour began with a three-way fight for first place, and the #7 held off both of the rival Porsches until it pitted with 3 hours and 45 minutes to go. By the end of the third hour, the #7 placed second and the #8 placed fourth. As the race was nearing the end of the fourth hour, the #7 was overtaken by one of the rival Porsches and its sister car, the #8, after trying to gamble unsuccessfully on slicks. The consequence was a pit stop to change back to wet tires, and rejoining the track, the #7 was in fourth position, two laps down. Throughout this point to the end of the race the positions of the Audis would not change, and the #8 and #7 finished third and fourth, with the #7 setting the fastest lap of the race at a 1:26.008. Porsche ended up winning the race. Audi was positioned second in the manufacturers standings, fifty-three points behind Porsche going into Shanghai. Porsche also had the ability to win the manufacturers' title in Shanghai.

The championship moved westward to Shanghai for the 6 Hours of Shanghai. Audi retained the aero package raced at Fuji for Shanghai. The #7 and #8 finished the first practice in positions first and second, besting the duo of Porsches in third and fourth. An opposite result occurred in the second free practice within the first four spots, with both Porsche prototypes leading the two Audis in the first two positions. The #8 and #7 placed in third and fourth, with the first Audi about eight tenths off the lead. In the final practice, The results from the second practice still held for the manufacturer positioning, except the #7 finished the practice ahead of the #8 in third place. Qualifying had much of the same result seen in the last two practice sessions, with the #8 placing third and the #7 placing fourth on the grid for the race. The #8 was about seven and a half tenths off the leading Porsche's time. Brendon Hartley set the fastest qualifying record (at the time), with an individual time of 1:42.621 seconds to lead the duo of Porsches to the front row starting positions. A wet race track with track temperatures at 15 °C (59 °F) and air temperature of 14 °C (57 °F) was present for the start of the race. In the first hour, the leading Porsche was able to get away from the field while and Audis tried to keep pace. During the hour, the #7 was engaged with the second of the Porsches, the #18. Consequently, they clashed, however, the Audi #7 was able to stay the course and not lose too much time, gaining a position to second place while the Porsche fell behind to the end of the field. The #7 and #8 finished off the hour second and third. During the second hour, Audi's decision to race on intermediate tires, resulted in an extra pit stop over the run to the end of the second hour, placing the #8 Audi in third and the #7 Audi in fourth. The #18 Porsche was able to reclaim its starting position rather quickly. By the end of the third hour, the #7 sat in seventh and the #8 in fourth. Both the Audis had already taken three pit stops in contrast to both Porsche's two, using their slicks and drying line forming on the track to catch the Porsches, who were trying to conserve their wet tires over the race session. The standings would stay this way until the end of the fifth hour, where both Audi's and Porsche's cars were all even at five pit stops, the #17 Porsche leading the #7 in second and #8 in third with the #18 Porsche in fourth. In the last hour, the #18 Porsche made gains to get ahead of both the Audis. Both the Porsche and Audi cars would take one more stop before the race ended, and ultimately, it would determine the finishing order of the #18 Porsche and Audis #7 and #8. After the #7 and #8 pitted, the #18 would pit, and would get out the pit quicker than the Audis, allowing it to leap both the #7 and the #8 by the end of the race. The final standings were the #17 and #18 Porsches finishing first and second while the #7 and #8 were third and fourth. Porsche claimed the manufacturers' titles with the first and second-place finish. Porsche would also have the opportunity to clinch the drivers' (with the #17 Porsche driver lineup) with a fourth-place finish or better next round. The #7 Audi driver lineup was second in the drivers' championship standings.

The season would conclude in the desert nation of Bahrain for the 6 Hours of Bahrain. Porsche edged out Audi in the first free practice, by seventeen thousandths, placing the #7 in second and the #8 about sixth tenths back in third. In the second practice which took place at night, the Audi locked out the first two positions, with the #7 and #8 placing first and second. In the final practice, the Porsches took the first two positions, and Audi finished with the #7 in third and #8 in fourth. In the last qualifying session of the season, Porsche was able to take pole position once again on average time between their two drivers. With the pole position at Bahrain, Porsche earned pole position spots for each for each round of the championship. The #7 finished the qualifying session in third and the #8 finished in fourth. Typical of the region, the race would be dry, with the track temperature at 31 °C (88 °F) and the air temperature at 24 °C (75 °F). In the first hour, the Porsches would break away from the Audis, but very slowly, as the Audis were not much slower. One of the Porsches would encounter trouble, the #17 Porsche, due to a broken throttle linkage, placing it behind four laps, eighteenth place overall. They would need to mount a rapid comeback to get ahead of the two Toyota TS040 Hybrids to reach the minimum position needed to secure the drivers' championship (assuming the #7 Audi wins). A full course yellow, gave the two Audis the advantage over the lone Porsche in front, leading to the #8 and #7 placing first and second by the end of the first hour. This positioning would last until the end of the third hour, until a brake disc failure knocked the leading Audi #8 out of first place in eighth place. When the car returned to the track, it was eight laps down on the leader, which happened to be the #7 Audi, which was threatening for the drivers' title. Meanwhile, the #17 Porsche was up to fifth place, two laps behind the #1 Toyota in fourth place. In the fourth hour, the #7 slipped back to second after having to deal with a faulty wheel nut, and by consequence, the #7 Audi had to take an extra stop to change a wheel. In the fifth hour, the #8 had a three-minute stop and hold penalty after the #8 crew fitted the car with the wrong front tires, requiring an additional stop, taking the team over their maximum allocation of thirty-four tires. The #17 Porsche had a failure of the gathering of energy to the front axle of the car. Having to be wary of the time it was losing to the #1 Toyota, the #17 Porsche team decided to send the car back out onto the track without it front axle energy storage system active, with only the exhaust energy recovery system functioning. At the conclusion of the race, #18 Porsche was able to hold off the #7 Audi by over a minute to win the race. The duo of Toyotas finished third and fourth, both three laps down, and the #17 car finished fifth, nine laps down. The #8 rounded off the LMP-H category, eleven laps down. The #17 Porsche was still able to earn the drivers championship by a mere five points to the #7 Audi, 166 to 161.

=== 2016 season ===
With plans to reclaim the manufacturers' title which Audi have not won since 2013, a brand new car, dubbed by the simple name of 'Audi R18' was fully revealed in its final competition design in March 2016. Mostly every peripheral within the design element of the 2016 car was fundamentally different from its predecessors. The front end and overall vehicle length changed, with the nose of the car becoming slimmer than ever before. At the front end of the car, the airflow is directed to the top of the car and between the wheel well outlets. This, in turn, enters the cooling ducts through the body hull and travels to the underfloor. To avoid vortices and turbulent airflow, which creates a loss of energy in the airflow (an increase in air resistance), Audi created a smaller monocoque space within the chassis structure, to allow high energy air to flow with ease through the chassis of the car. More than ever, the new R18 directs airflow more efficiently to the underfloor to escape via the rear diffuser, which helps create a downforce to assist the car in cornering. The monocoque is 4,560 millimeters in length (which is the maximum length per the regulations). The regulations also called for larger openings in the front wheel arches to keep the car grounded. The high torsional stiffness of the chassis build has been built around the drive shaft for the hybrid system, with new mounting points for the front wishbone suspension. The spring damper elements are activated through pushrods at the front and pull rods at the rear. The transmission was optimized to be a lighter, six-speed gear unit. The car uses a high-pressure central hydraulics system to reduce weight while still actuating braking, transmission, and engine operations. The vehicle weight is 875 kilograms. Audi upgraded the R18 to the 6 MJ class, and for the new car, an electrochemical battery storage system will accumulate energy in the hybrid system instead of a flywheel, which will be located in the monocoque. The MGU (motor generated unit) at the front axle will gather kinetic energy through the rotation of the wheels until braking and disperse to help the car accelerate. The MGU can store and output more than 355 kW (476 hp) (limited to 304 kW (408 hp) at Le Mans). Consequently, switching to a higher MJ class reduces the fuel capacity to 49.9 liters in exchange for a higher engine power output of over 390 kW (520 hp). The foundation of the V6 TDI engine still revolves around the variable geometry turbocharger, with a 120-degree cylinder bank angle, and torque output of 850 Newton meters, in use since 2011, but now consumes 32.4 percent less fuel in 2016 in contrast to 2011. Much like the rest of the car, the safety measures of the car have been revised. Audi's technology of Matrix LED headlights and LaserLight was carried over and revised for 2016, and rearward vision is displayed through an AMOLED monitor connected to a rearview camera. A brake force distribution system works automatically and is connected to the hybrid system to regulate energy generated under braking. The monocoque consists of a high strength CFRP with an aluminum honeycomb core. The hybrid system is encased in a high voltage protection system. The car was first tested in late 2015 ahead of the 2016 season.

Audi's regular season car numbers did not change from last year, as the main two cars still sported the #7 and #8. The driver lineup consisted with the same driver lineup as last year, assigned to the same car numbers, with the #7 driven by André Lotterer, Benoît Tréluyer, and Marcel Fässler. The #8 car would be operated by Oliver Jarvis, Lucas Di Grassi, and Loïc Duval. The 2016 season began at Silverstone Circuit as it did for all the years of the FIA WEC seasons. Defending champions Porsche brought a new version of the 919 Hybrid, redesigned to be lighter to counter the regulation of electrical power and fuel capacity. The foundation of the chassis was carried over from 2015, with a few revised aerodynamic changes. Coming of the rather flat 2015 season that saw the defending champs uncompetitive to the likes of their German rivals, Toyota came with a brand new model, the TS050 Hybrid, which most notable change was the implementation of a smaller 2.4 liter, twin-turbocharged V6 engine. The powerplant of the hybrid system was also of note, as a lithium-ion battery was used instead of a capacitor to store and supply energy. For the opening practice session of the season, Porsche was able to secure the first two positions, both a second and a half clear of the next best LMP1 runner, their best time a 1:42.182. The two Audi cars, the #8 in fourth and the #7 in sixth were separated by two and a half seconds with the #8 running a 1:43.917. In the second practice, the Porsche was once again the fastest setting a 1:39.655, with the #8 Audi being the fastest Audi, with a best time of 1:42.454. The #7 placed fifth. Snowfall plagued free practice, three and session was red-flagged and eventually was suspended. In qualifying, the fastest times of the drivers assigned to a given car are averaged to form the starting grid order for every FIA WEC class. There were two qualifying sessions, one for the LM GTE's and Prototype racers. In qualifying, the #7 Audi, after being mostly at the bottom of the LMP1-H standings for both of the free practice sessions, the #7 was able to rebound to earn a pole for the race. Following averaging a tenth behind was the #8, which snapped an 11-race streak starting from pole for Porsche. The race got under way with the air temperature at 9 °C (48 °F) and the track temperature at 7 °C (45 °F). Both Audis got away cleanly and the #7 gained a significant lead off the start. However, it would only be a few laps until the Porsche in third showed its ability to challenge the first of the Audis for second, that car being the #8. By lap seven, the Porsche made the pass on the #8 Audi and eventually by the end of the first hour, the #1 Porsche would take the lead over the #8, with the pole-sitting #7 in third. Going into the second hour, the leading Porsche began to stretch its legs on the field, lapping in the 1:40's gaining up to a fifteen-second lead on the pair of Audis in second and third. As the hour continued, the #7 would take second back from the #8. As the LMP1 hybrids concluded their second pit stop cycle, the #1 Porsche had a lead of about forty seconds after a lengthy pit stop that included a driver change for the #7. Not much later, the #7 would have a spin, resulting in the #2 Porsche passing it for second place. Chaos ensued for the #1 Porsche at the end of the hour, with a crash involving a GT AM car. The incident would prove terminal for both car's chances to complete the race. Trouble would also be in store for the #8, as the car stopped off track with MGU problems. A full course yellow would be deployed to clean up both incidents. The #2 Porsche gained the lead, with the #7 behind in second. The full course yellow would extend into half of the third hour. When the race returned to green, the #7 would gain on the sole Porsche and overtake it for first place. Through the fourth to the end of the fifth hour, the #7 would defend its lead against the Porsche, maintaining good pace, even with a safety car period that brought them nose-to-tail. Going into the last hour, the last pit stop for the Audi brought its advantage over Porsche to seven seconds. With the aid of lap traffic, the Audi was able to keep the lead. A late pit stop by the #2 Porsche sealed the race victory for Audi. However, the celebration for Audi would be short lived, due to a post-race scrutineering infringement, with the thickness of the skid block not complying with the regulations. With the retirement of the #8 car during the event and the exclusion of the #7 with the failure to comply to regulations, Audi would receive one point (from winning pole position) for Silverstone and would sit last in the manufacturer standings below Porsche and Toyota.

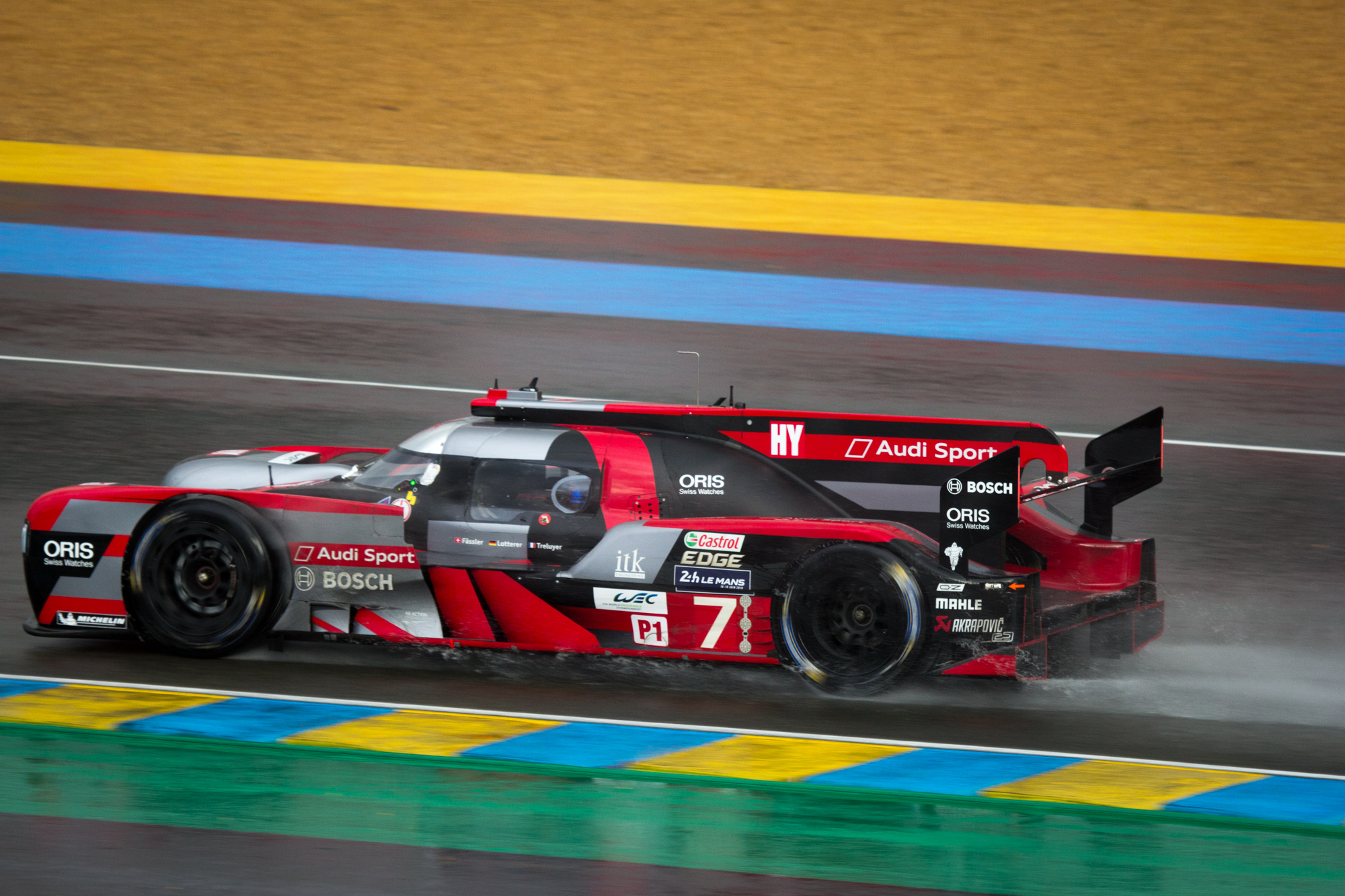
The No, 7 R18 at the 2016 24 Hours of Le Mans

Spa-Francorchamps would be the second race on the calendar. At the end of the first free practice, the Audi prototypes were placed fourth and sixth, the #7 being the better of the Audis but almost two seconds off the pace of the Porsche, which was leading at the end. The second practice session would only see one of the Audis take part, that being the #7. The #7 would place fifth overall. The #8 was receiving repairs to its front axle drivetrain. The duo of Toyotas led the way, the fastest of the two lapping over a second and a half clear of the #7 Audi. In the third free practice, the #7 Audi was briefly on top early, but by the end a very fast lap by one of the Porsches would put it well ahead of the #7 Audi by two and a half seconds. The #8 Audi made contact with a LMP2 car during the session, damaging the car enough take it out for the remainder of the session. The car placed sixth. Qualifying would favor the Porsches, as they took the top two positions. The #1 Porsche would have the best lap time of the weekend, setting a 1:55.691. The #8 and #7 would be placed in positions fourth and sixth, with the #8 setting a 1:57.716. The race would take place under a clear sky, with the air temperature being 24 °C (75 °F) and the track temperature being 49 °C (120 °F). At the beginning of the first hour, the #1 Porsche would get off clean and quick, and its sister car would follow. However, not very long after, hybrid system problems would plague the #2 Porsche, placing the car in sixth after the issues were resolved. The #8 Audi would move up to second place and try to catch the leading Porsche, but around forty minutes into the hour, the #5 Toyota was able get by the #8 Audi and eventually to the lead past the #1 Porsche, with the #7 Audi behind in fourth place. In the second hour, the #1 Porsche would suffer from two tire punctures, dropping the car down to fourteenth overall. The put the #8 in second place behind the leading Toyota. Meanwhile, the #7 Audi would suffer from floor damage after running over a curb, resulting in a visit to the garage. The car would drop in the order to seventeenth overall. At the conclusion of the third hour, the #7 would move up to fourteenth place, but continued to lose laps after a pit stop to clean the ducts to prevent overheating after a piece of rubber clogged a portion of the air duct. By the end of the fourth hour, the #8 would drop a lap to the leading #5 Toyota, but remain in second place. The #7 Audi would move up to seventh overall, seven laps down. The race would have a completely different look by the end of the fifth hour that would favor Audi. The #8 would gain the lead with the leading #5 Toyota losing a massive amount of laps, suffering engine problems. Behind the #8, the #2 Porsche was laps down in third. When the race ended, the #8 Audi would come across the line in first place, over the #2 Porsche, which was two laps down after struggling predominately from a disabled hybrid system for the majority of the race. The #5 Toyota finished last the order after dominated half of the race. The #7 Audi would salvage a fifth-place finish, five laps down off the lead. With the win, Audi's first of the season, Audi would remain in third place, but gain forty points in the manufacturers championship, three points behind Toyota and sixteen behind Porsche.

== Complete racing results ==
(key) Races in bold indicates pole position. Races in italics indicates fastest lap.

FIA World Endurance Championship
Year	Entrant	Engine	Class	Drivers	No.	1	2	3	4	5	6	7	8	9	Points	Pos
Year	Entrant	Engine	Class	Drivers	No.	**(United States) SEB**	**(Belgium) SPA**	**(France) 24H**	**(United Kingdom) SIL**	**(Brazil)** **SAO**	**(Bahrain)** **BHR**	**(Japan)** **FUJ**	**(China)** **SHA**		Points	Pos
2012	(Germany) Audi Sport Team Joest	Audi TDI 3.7 L Turbo Diesel V6 Audi TDI 3.7 L Turbo Hybrid Diesel V6	LMP1	(Germany) André Lotterer	1	**11**	2	**1**	**1**	2	1	2	3		172.5	1st
2012	(Germany) Audi Sport Team Joest	Audi TDI 3.7 L Turbo Diesel V6 Audi TDI 3.7 L Turbo Hybrid Diesel V6	LMP1	(France) Benoît Tréluyer	1	**11**	2	**1**	**1**	2	1	2	3		172.5	1st
2012	(Germany) Audi Sport Team Joest	Audi TDI 3.7 L Turbo Diesel V6 Audi TDI 3.7 L Turbo Hybrid Diesel V6	LMP1	(Switzerland) Marcel Fässler	1	**11**	2	**1**	**1**	2	1	2	3		172.5	1st
2012	(Germany) Audi Sport Team Joest	Audi TDI 3.7 L Turbo Diesel V6 Audi TDI 3.7 L Turbo Hybrid Diesel V6	LMP1	(Italy) Rinaldo Capello	2	1	**4**	2							159	2nd
2012	(Germany) Audi Sport Team Joest	Audi TDI 3.7 L Turbo Diesel V6 Audi TDI 3.7 L Turbo Hybrid Diesel V6	LMP1	(United Kingdom) Allan McNish	2	1	**4**	2	3	3	**2**	3	2		159	2nd
2012	(Germany) Audi Sport Team Joest	Audi TDI 3.7 L Turbo Diesel V6 Audi TDI 3.7 L Turbo Hybrid Diesel V6	LMP1	(Denmark) Tom Kristensen	2	1	**4**	2	3	3	**2**	3	2		159	2nd
2012	(Germany) Audi Sport Team Joest	Audi TDI 3.7 L Turbo Diesel V6 Audi TDI 3.7 L Turbo Hybrid Diesel V6	LMP1	(Brazil) Lucas di Grassi	2					3					159	2nd
2012	(Germany) Audi Sport Team Joest	Audi TDI 3.7 L Turbo Diesel V6 Audi TDI 3.7 L Turbo Hybrid Diesel V6	LMP1	(Germany) Timo Bernhard	3	2									67	6th
2012	(Germany) Audi Sport Team Joest	Audi TDI 3.7 L Turbo Diesel V6 Audi TDI 3.7 L Turbo Hybrid Diesel V6	LMP1	(France) Romain Dumas	3	2	1	5							67	6th
2012	(Germany) Audi Sport Team Joest	Audi TDI 3.7 L Turbo Diesel V6 Audi TDI 3.7 L Turbo Hybrid Diesel V6	LMP1	(France) Loïc Duval	3	2	1	5							67	6th
2012	(Germany) Audi Sport Team Joest	Audi TDI 3.7 L Turbo Diesel V6 Audi TDI 3.7 L Turbo Hybrid Diesel V6	LMP1	(Spain) Marc Gené	3		1	5							67	6th
2012	(Germany) Audi Sport North America	Audi TDI 3.7 L Turbo Diesel V6	LMP1	(United Kingdom) Oliver Jarvis	4		3	3							NC	NC
2012	(Germany) Audi Sport North America	Audi TDI 3.7 L Turbo Diesel V6	LMP1	(Italy) Marco Bonanomi	4		3	3							NC	NC
2012	(Germany) Audi Sport North America	Audi TDI 3.7 L Turbo Diesel V6	LMP1	(Germany) Mike Rockenfeller	4			3							NC	NC
					No.	1	2	3	4	5	6	7	8	9	Points	Pos
					No.	**(United Kingdom) SIL**	**(Belgium) SPA**	**(France) 24H**	**(Brazil) SAO**	**(United States) COTA**	**(Japan) FUJ**	**(China) SHA**	**(Bahrain) BHR**		Points	Pos
2013	(Germany) Audi Sport Team Joest	Audi TDI 3.7 L Turbo Hybrid Diesel V6	LMP1	(Germany) André Lotterer	1	2	**1**	5	**1**	3	**26**	1	2		149.25	2nd
2013	(Germany) Audi Sport Team Joest	Audi TDI 3.7 L Turbo Hybrid Diesel V6	LMP1	(France) Benoît Tréluyer	1	2	**1**	5	**1**	3	**26**	1	2		149.25	2nd
2013	(Germany) Audi Sport Team Joest	Audi TDI 3.7 L Turbo Hybrid Diesel V6	LMP1	(Switzerland) Marcel Fässler	1	2	**1**	5	**1**	3	**26**	1	2		149.25	2nd
2013	(Germany) Audi Sport Team Joest	Audi TDI 3.7 L Turbo Hybrid Diesel V6	LMP1	(United Kingdom) Allan McNish	2	1	2	**1**	2	**1**	2	3	Ret		162	1st
2013	(Germany) Audi Sport Team Joest	Audi TDI 3.7 L Turbo Hybrid Diesel V6	LMP1	(Denmark) Tom Kristensen	2	1	2	**1**	2	**1**	2	3	Ret		162	1st
2013	(Germany) Audi Sport Team Joest	Audi TDI 3.7 L Turbo Hybrid Diesel V6	LMP1	(France) Loïc Duval	2	1	2	**1**	2	**1**	2	3	Ret		162	1st
2013	(Germany) Audi Sport Team Joest	Audi TDI 3.7 L Turbo Hybrid Diesel V6	LMP1	(Spain) Marc Gené	3		3	3							45	9th
2013	(Germany) Audi Sport Team Joest	Audi TDI 3.7 L Turbo Hybrid Diesel V6	LMP1	(United Kingdom) Oliver Jarvis	3		3	3							45	9th
2013	(Germany) Audi Sport Team Joest	Audi TDI 3.7 L Turbo Hybrid Diesel V6	LMP1	(Brazil) Lucas di Grassi	3		3	3							45	9th
					No.	1	2	3	4	5	6	7	8	9	Points	Pos
					No.	**(United Kingdom) SIL**	**(Belgium) SPA**	**(France) 24H**	**(United States) COTA**	**(Japan) FUJ**	**(China) SHA**	**(Bahrain) BHR**	**(Brazil) SAO**		Points	Pos
2014	(Germany) Audi Sport Team Joest	Audi TDI 4.0 L Turbo Diesel V6	LMP1	(France) Loïc Duval	1	Ret	2		2	5	5	5	3		117	4th
2014	(Germany) Audi Sport Team Joest	Audi TDI 4.0 L Turbo Diesel V6	LMP1	(Denmark) Tom Kristensen	1	Ret	2	2	2	5	5	5	3		117	4th
2014	(Germany) Audi Sport Team Joest	Audi TDI 4.0 L Turbo Diesel V6	LMP1	(Brazil) Lucas di Grassi	1	Ret	2	2	2	5	5	5	3		117	4th
2014	(Germany) Audi Sport Team Joest	Audi TDI 4.0 L Turbo Diesel V6	LMP1	(Spain) Marc Gené	1			2							117	4th
2014	(Germany) Audi Sport Team Joest	Audi TDI 4.0 L Turbo Diesel V6	LMP1	(Germany) André Lotterer	2	Ret	5	1	1	6	4	4	5		127	2nd
2014	(Germany) Audi Sport Team Joest	Audi TDI 4.0 L Turbo Diesel V6	LMP1	(France) Benoît Tréluyer	2	Ret	5	1	1	6	4	4	5		127	2nd
2014	(Germany) Audi Sport Team Joest	Audi TDI 4.0 L Turbo Diesel V6	LMP1	(Switzerland) Marcel Fässler	2	Ret	5	1	1	6	4	4	5		127	2nd
2014	(Germany) Audi Sport Team Joest	Audi TDI 4.0 L Turbo Diesel V6	LMP1	(Italy) Marco Bonanomi	3		6	Ret							8	7th
2014	(Germany) Audi Sport Team Joest	Audi TDI 4.0 L Turbo Diesel V6	LMP1	(Portugal) Filipe Albuquerque	3		6	Ret							8	7th
2014	(Germany) Audi Sport Team Joest	Audi TDI 4.0 L Turbo Diesel V6	LMP1	(United Kingdom) Oliver Jarvis	3			Ret							8	7th
					No.	1	2	3	4	5	6	7	8	9	Points	Pos
					No.	**(United Kingdom) SIL**	**(Belgium) SPA**	**(France) 24H**	**(Germany) NUR**	**(United States) COTA**	**(Japan) FUJ**	**(China) SHA**	**(Bahrain) BHR**		Points	Pos
2015	(Germany) Audi Sport Team Joest	Audi TDI 4.0 L Turbo Diesel V6	LMP1	(Germany) André Lotterer	7	1	1	3	3	2	3	3	2		161	2nd
2015	(Germany) Audi Sport Team Joest	Audi TDI 4.0 L Turbo Diesel V6	LMP1	(France) Benoît Tréluyer	7	1	1	3	3	2	3	3	2		161	2nd
2015	(Germany) Audi Sport Team Joest	Audi TDI 4.0 L Turbo Diesel V6	LMP1	(Switzerland) Marcel Fässler	7	1	1	3	3	2	3	3	2		161	2nd
2015	(Germany) Audi Sport Team Joest	Audi TDI 4.0 L Turbo Diesel V6	LMP1	(United Kingdom) Oliver Jarvis	8	5	7	4	4	3	4	4	6		99	4th
2015	(Germany) Audi Sport Team Joest	Audi TDI 4.0 L Turbo Diesel V6	LMP1	(Brazil) Lucas di Grassi	8	5	7	4	4	3	4	4	6		99	4th
2015	(Germany) Audi Sport Team Joest	Audi TDI 4.0 L Turbo Diesel V6	LMP1	(France) Loïc Duval	8	5	7	4	4	3	4	4	6		99	4th
2015	(Germany) Audi Sport Team Joest	Audi TDI 4.0 L Turbo Diesel V6	LMP1	(Italy) Marco Bonanomi	9		4	7							24	12th
2015	(Germany) Audi Sport Team Joest	Audi TDI 4.0 L Turbo Diesel V6	LMP1	(Portugal) Filipe Albuquerque	9		4	7							24	12th
2015	(Germany) Audi Sport Team Joest	Audi TDI 4.0 L Turbo Diesel V6	LMP1	(Germany) René Rast	9		4	7							24	12th
					No.	1	2	3	4	5	6	7	8	9	Points	Pos
					No.	**(United Kingdom) SIL**	**(Belgium) SPA**	**(France) 24H**	**(Germany) NUR**	**(Mexico)** **MEX**	**(United States) COTA**	**(Japan) FUJ**	**(China) SHA**	**(Bahrain) BHR**	Points	Pos
2016	(Germany) Audi Sport Team Joest	Audi TDI 4.0 L Turbo Diesel V6	LMP1	(Germany) André Lotterer	7	**DSQ**	5	4	**3**	2	**6**	Ret	6	2	104	5th
2016	(Germany) Audi Sport Team Joest	Audi TDI 4.0 L Turbo Diesel V6	LMP1	(Switzerland) Marcel Fässler	7	**DSQ**	5	4	**3**	2	**6**	Ret	6	2	104	5th
2016	(Germany) Audi Sport Team Joest	Audi TDI 4.0 L Turbo Diesel V6	LMP1	(France) Benoît Tréluyer	7	**DSQ**	5	4			**6**	Ret	6	2	104	5th
2016	(Germany) Audi Sport Team Joest	Audi TDI 4.0 L Turbo Diesel V6	LMP1	(United Kingdom) Oliver Jarvis	8	Ret	1	3	2	**27**	2	**2**	5	**1**	147.5	2nd
2016	(Germany) Audi Sport Team Joest	Audi TDI 4.0 L Turbo Diesel V6	LMP1	(Brazil) Lucas di Grassi	8	Ret	1	3	2	**27**	2	**2**	5	**1**	147.5	2nd
2016	(Germany) Audi Sport Team Joest	Audi TDI 4.0 L Turbo Diesel V6	LMP1	(France) Loïc Duval	8	Ret	1	3	2	**27**	2	**2**	5	**1**	147.5	2nd

== 24 Hours of Le Mans results ==
Year	Team	Drivers	Car #	Class	Laps	Pos.	Class Pos.
2011	(Germany) Audi Sport Team Joest	(Germany) Mike Rockenfeller (Germany) Timo Bernhard (France) Romain Dumas	1	LMP1	116	DNF	DNF
2011	(Germany) Audi Sport Team Joest	(Germany) André Lotterer (Switzerland) Marcel Fässler (France) Benoit Treluyer	2	LMP1	377	1st	1st
2011	(Germany) Audi Sport North America	(Denmark) Tom Kristensen (United Kingdom) Allan McNish (Italy) Rinaldo Capello	3	LMP1	14	DNF	DNF
2012	(Germany) Audi Sport Team Joest	(Germany) André Lotterer (Switzerland) Marcel Fässler (France) Benoit Treluyer	1	LMP1	378	1st	1st
2012	(Germany) Audi Sport Team Joest	(Denmark) Tom Kristensen (United Kingdom) Allan McNish (Italy) Rinaldo Capello	2	LMP1	377	2nd	2nd
2012	(Germany) Audi Sport Team Joest	(Spain) Marc Gené (France) Romain Dumas (France) Loic Duval	3	LMP1	366	5th	5th
2012	(Germany) Audi Sport North America	(United Kingdom) Oliver Jarvis (Italy) Marco Bonanomi (Germany) Mike Rockenfeller	4	LMP1	375	3rd	3rd
2013	(Germany) Audi Sport Team Joest	(Germany) André Lotterer (Switzerland) Marcel Fässler (France) Benoit Treluyer	1	LMP1	338	5th	5th
2013	(Germany) Audi Sport Team Joest	(Denmark) Tom Kristensen (United Kingdom) Allan McNish (France) Loic Duval	2	LMP1	348	1st	1st
2013	(Germany) Audi Sport Team Joest	(Spain) Marc Gené (United Kingdom) Oliver Jarvis (Brazil) Lucas di Grassi	3	LMP1	347	3rd	3rd
2014	(Germany) Audi Sport Team Joest	(Denmark) Tom Kristensen (Spain) Marc Gené (Brazil) Lucas di Grassi	1	LMP1	376	2nd	2nd
2014	(Germany) Audi Sport Team Joest	(Germany) André Lotterer (Switzerland) Marcel Fässler (France) Benoit Treluyer	2	LMP1	379	1st	1st
2014	(Germany) Audi Sport Team Joest	(Portugal) Filipe Albuquerque (Italy) Marco Bonanomi (United Kingdom) Oliver Jarvis	3	LMP1	25	DNF	DNF
2015	(Germany) Audi Sport Team Joest	(Germany) André Lotterer (Switzerland) Marcel Fässler (France) Benoit Treluyer	7	LMP1	393	3rd	3rd
2015	(Germany) Audi Sport Team Joest	(France) Loic Duval (Brazil) Lucas di Grassi (United Kingdom) Oliver Jarvis	8	LMP1	392	4th	4th
2015	(Germany) Audi Sport Team Joest	(Portugal) Filipe Albuquerque (Italy) Marco Bonanomi (Germany) René Rast	9	LMP1	387	7th	7th
2016	(Germany) Audi Sport Team Joest	(Germany) André Lotterer (Switzerland) Marcel Fässler (France) Benoit Treluyer	7	LMP1	367	4th	4th
2016	(Germany) Audi Sport Team Joest	(France) Loic Duval (Brazil) Lucas di Grassi (United Kingdom) Oliver Jarvis	8	LMP1	372	3rd	3rd

== Marketing ==
The R18 e-tron quattro was featured in the Audi RS 6 Avant commercial.
