= 2014 6 Hours of Circuit of the Americas =

Sports car endurance race held at the Circuit of the Americas near Austin, Texas, USA

Map of the Circuit of the Americas

The 2014 6 Hours of Circuit of the Americas was a six-hour endurance sports car racing event held for Le Mans Prototype and Le Mans Grand Touring Endurance cars at the Circuit of the Americas near Austin, Texas on 20 September 2014. It served as the fourth of eight rounds of the 2014 FIA World Endurance Championship and was the second time the race was held as part of the championship. A total of 50,334 spectators attended the event.

The No. 8 Toyota TS040 Hybrid of Sébastien Buemi, Anthony Davidson and Nicolas Lapierre won the pole position with the fastest two-lap average lap time and maintained its start-line advantage until a monsoon fell on the track and stopped the race for 77 minutes. Audi's No. 2 R18 e-tron quattro of Marcel Fässler, André Lotterer and Benoît Tréluyer and Romain Dumas, Neel Jani and Marc Lieb in the No. 14 Porsche 919 Hybrid battled for the outright lead until the latter car slowed with engine problems and the former vehicle took the victory. The sister No. 1 Audi of Loïc Duval, Lucas di Grassi and Tom Kristensen finished in second place and the No. 8 Toyota completed the outright podium finishers in third.

The (Le Mans Prototype 1-Lightweight) LMP1-L category was won by the No. 12 Rebellion Racing Rebellion-Toyota of Nick Heidfeld, Mathias Beche, and Nico Prost. The Le Mans Prototype 2 (LMP2) category finished with the No. 47 KCMG Oreca 03R of Richard Bradley, Matthew Howson and Tsugio Matsuda taking the team's first class victory in the World Endurance Championship, ahead of the No. 27 SMP Racing Oreca driven by Sergey Zlobin, Maurizio and Nicolas Minassian in second and the debuting Extreme Speed Motorsports HPD-ARX 03 of Ed Brown, Ryan Dalziel and Scott Sharp took third. Stefan Mücke and Darren Turner in the No. 97 Aston Martin Vantage won the Le Mans Grand Touring Endurance Professional (LMGTE Pro) class and the British marque also took the Le Mans Grand Touring Endurance Amateur (LMGTE Am) category with Paul Dalla Lana, Pedro Lamy and Christoffer Nygaard in the No. 98 Vantage.

The result of the race meant Davidson, Lapierre and Buemi kept their lead in the Drivers' Championship to 96 points, but their advantage over Lotterer, Fässler and Tréluyer was reduced to eleven points. Di Grassi and Kristensen remained in the third position with 72 points. Beche, Heidfeld and Prost maintained fourth with 48 points and Dumas, Jani and Lieb rounded out the top five with 45 points. In the Manufacturers' Championship, Audi (with 157 points) took the lead from Toyota (139 points) while Porsche remained in third with 82 points with four races left in the season.

== Background ==
=== Entrants ===
A total of twenty-nine cars were officially entered for the 6 Hours of Circuit of the Americas, with the bulk of entries in Le Mans Prototype 1 (LMP1) and Le Mans Prototype 2 (LMP2). The 2013 race winners, Audi Sport Team Joest, returned to defend their title. Three manufacturers were represented in LMP1, including a duo of cars entered by Audi Sport Team Joest, Toyota and Porsche. Kazuki Nakajima was not available to drive the No. 7 Toyota TS040 Hybrid because of a Super Formula commitment and was replaced by IndyCar Series driver Mike Conway. After spending the last three months recovering from a heavy crash during practice for the 24 Hours of Le Mans, Loïc Duval returned to Audi Sport Team Joest after doctors granted him medical clearance. The Kodewa-backed Lotus team moved up from the LMP2 category with their new CLM P1/01 but missed the first three races because the new car was not ready. In the month before its debut, Lotus named Super GT competitor James Rossiter, experienced sports car driver Christophe Bouchut and Formula Three European Championship race winner Lucas Auer as the trio to pilot the No. 9 car. Rebellion Racing was the other representative of the LMP1 privateer teams.

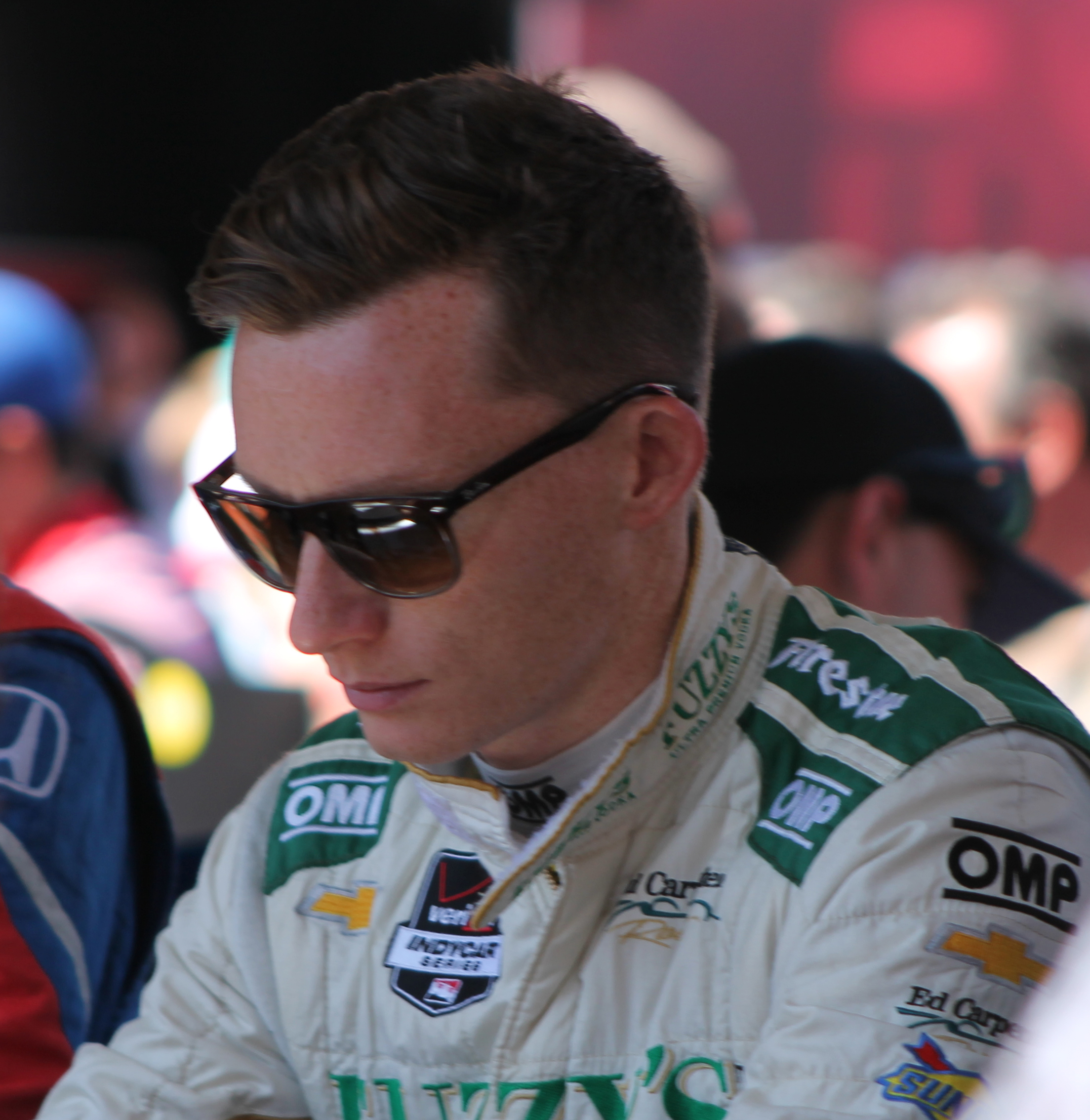
Mike Conway replaced Kazuki Nakajima at Toyota because Nakajima had a Super Formula commitment

LMP2 consisted of four cars with twelve drivers. United SportsCar Championship participants Extreme Speed Motorsports debuted in the World Endurance Championship with a HPD ARX 03B-Honda driven by the team's regular drivers Scott Sharp, Ryan Dalziel and Ed Brown. Tsugio Matsuda returned from his four-month hiatus from prototype car racing and joined Matthew Howson and Richard Bradley in driving the No. 47 KCMG Oreca 03R-Nissan. After SMP Racing rearranged their driver lineups for Le Mans, the team returned to their regular driver pairings for the rest of the season starting at the 6 Hours of Circuit of the Americas. G-Drive Racing switched from the Morgan chassis to the new Nissan powered Ligier JS P2 monocoque. The Le Mans Grand Touring Endurance Professional (LMGTE Pro) field consisted of four manufacturers (Aston Martin, Ferrari, Porsche and Corvette Racing), while the Le Mans Grand Touring Endurance Amateur (LMGTE Am) entrants were six teams: Aston Martin Racing, AF Corse, Prospeed Competition, Proton Competition, 8 Star Motorsports and Krohn Racing. Porsche Team Manthey changed their driver roster: Richard Lietz could not recover sufficiently from a fractured arm he sustained while practising at Virginia International Raceway. As a precaution, Lietz was replaced by Nick Tandy who was paired by Jörg Bergmeister in the No. 91 Porsche 911 RSR. Patrick Pilet moved to the No. 92 car to partner regular driver Frédéric Makowiecki.

Corvette Racing entered a Chevrolet Corvette C7.R with Tommy Milner and Wayne Taylor Racing's Jordan Taylor and Ricky Taylor competing in the company's first World Endurance Championship (WEC) race outside of the 24 Hours of Le Mans. James Calado missed Le Mans because he suffered from two brain haemorrhages as a consequence of a heavy practice accident. He did recover sufficiently to return to sports car racing and retook his role of sharing the No. 71 Ferrari 458 Italia with Davide Rigon at the 6 Hours of Circuit of the Americas. Krohn Racing, who competed full-time in the 2012 and 2013 seasons, entered its No. 57 Ferrari 458 Italia for owner Tracy Krohn, his long-time teammate Niclas Jönsson and experienced racer Ben Collins. Matthieu Vaxivière returned to compete for Prospeed Competition after breaking his vertebrae in a Formula Renault 3.5 Series accident in Monaco which forced him to miss Le Mans. He co-drove the Dempsey-Proton Racing Porsche 911 RSR. Enzo Potolicchio stopped driving for the rest of the season and his place in the 8 Star Motorsports Ferrari was taken by 24 Hours of Daytona class winner Jeff Segal. Nicki Thiim was absent because of a Porsche Carrera Cup Germany commitment at the Sachsenring and was substituted by Richie Stanaway.

=== Preview ===
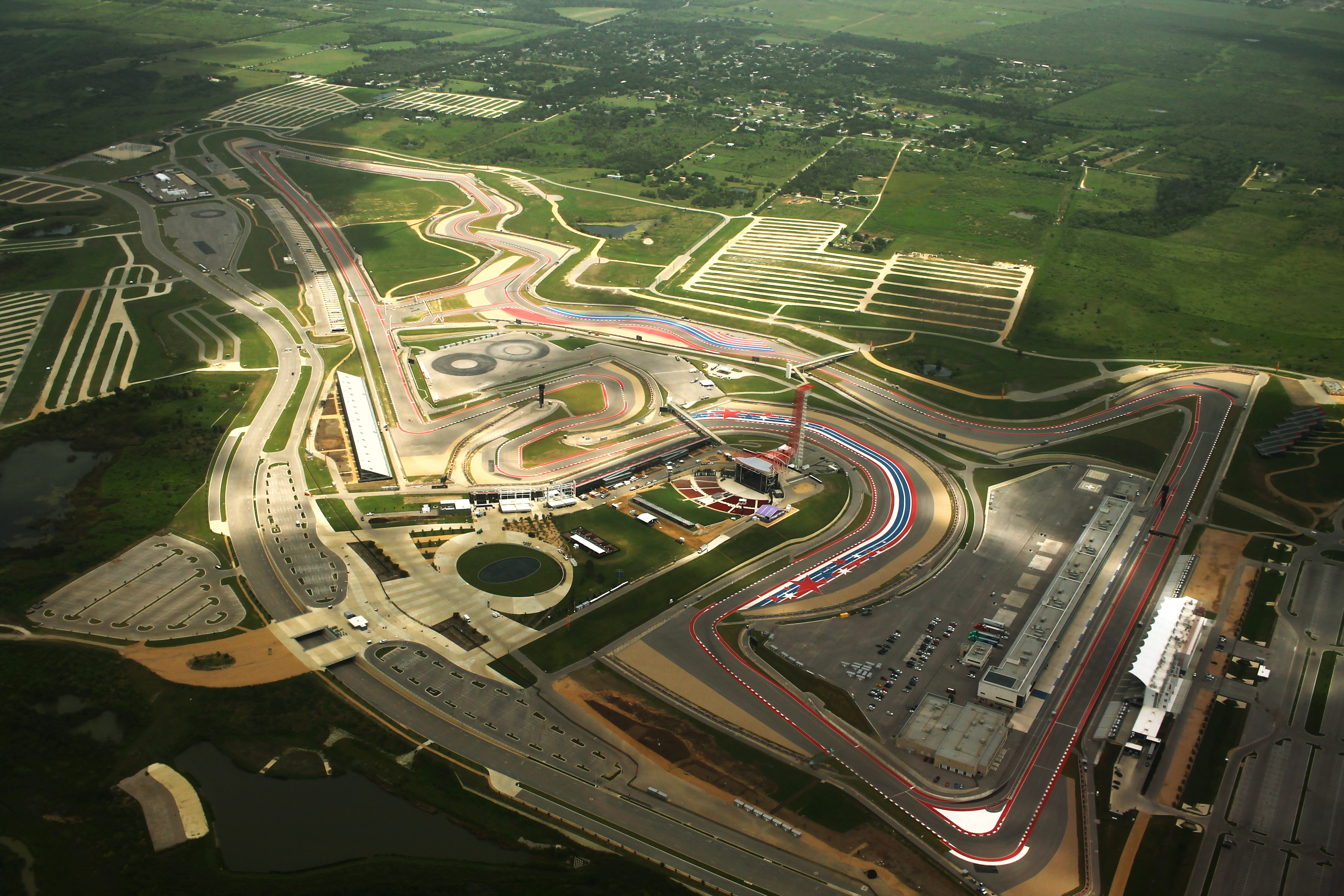
Circuit of the Americas (pictured in 2015), where the race was held

The 6 Hours of Circuit of the Americas was confirmed as part of the FIA World Endurance Championship's 2014 schedule in an FIA Endurance Commission meeting in Paris in January 2014. It was the fourth of eight scheduled endurance sports car round of the 2014 FIA World Endurance Championship, the second running of the event, and the season's sole North American race. It was held on 20 September at the Circuit of the Americas in Austin, Texas following two days of practice and qualifying. An agreement was reached by circuit officials, the Automobile Club de l'Ouest (ACO) and International Motor Sports Association (IMSA) to run the race on the Saturday. WEC used the Circuit of the Americas' 3.427 mi (5.515 km) 20-turn Grand Prix layout.

Before the race Toyota drivers Anthony Davidson, Sébastien Buemi and Nicolas Lapierre led the Drivers' Championship with 80 points, 20 ahead of their nearest rivals André Lotterer, Marcel Fässler and Benoît Tréluyer of Audi Sport Team Joest and a further six in front of their two teammates Lucas di Grassi and Tom Kristensen. Rebellion Racing's Mathias Beche, Nico Prost and Nick Heidfeld were fourth with 42 points and part-time driver Marc Gené rounded out the top five with 36 points. Toyota led the Manufacturers' Championship with 115 points, one ahead of their nearest rivals Audi in second; the third-placed manufacturer Porsche had accumulated 60 points.

Going into the race the FIA Endurance Commission altered the balance of performance in LMP1 and LMGTE. The two Audi R18 e-tron quattro cars had their engine power altered by 0.3 per cent but had a one percent in fuel flow per hour along with a small increase of fuel capacity by 0.1 litres (0.022 imp gal; 0.026 US gal). The minimum weight of the LMP1 privateer cars was reduced to 800 kilograms (1,800 lb) from the Le Mans limit of 810 kilograms (1,790 lb) as the CLM P1/01 and Rebellion R-Ones received a four percent increase in maximum fuel flow rate and a fifteen percent break in fuel energy per lap to increase their performance. In the LMGTE category the commission added an additional 20 kilograms (44 lb) of ballast to the Aston Martins to lower their performance.

== Practice ==
There were three practice sessions—one 90-minute session each on Thursday afternoon and evening and a one-hour session on Friday afternoon—preceding Saturday's race. The first practice session took place in overcast and cool weather conditions. The No. 2 Audi R18 e-tron quattro driven by Fässler led with the fastest lap time of the day, at 1 minute and 51.136 seconds, one-tenth of a second quicker than teammate Kristensen in second whose best lap was recorded late in the session. Brendon Hartley's No. 20 Porsche 919 Hybrid was third-fastest after leading the session in its opening minutes and both Toyota TS040 Hybrids rounded out the top five in LMP1-H. Davidson stopped his car near the exit of pit lane in the closing minutes of the session with a systems problem but continued after he restarted his vehicle. Olivier Pla was first to lead LMP2 but Dalziel ended as the fastest driver with a lap of 1 minute and 58.111 seconds. Pla fell to second and Howson was third. Darren Turner's No. 97 Aston Martin was the quickest car late on in LMGTE Pro while Stanaway helped the British marque to be fastest in LMGTE Am.

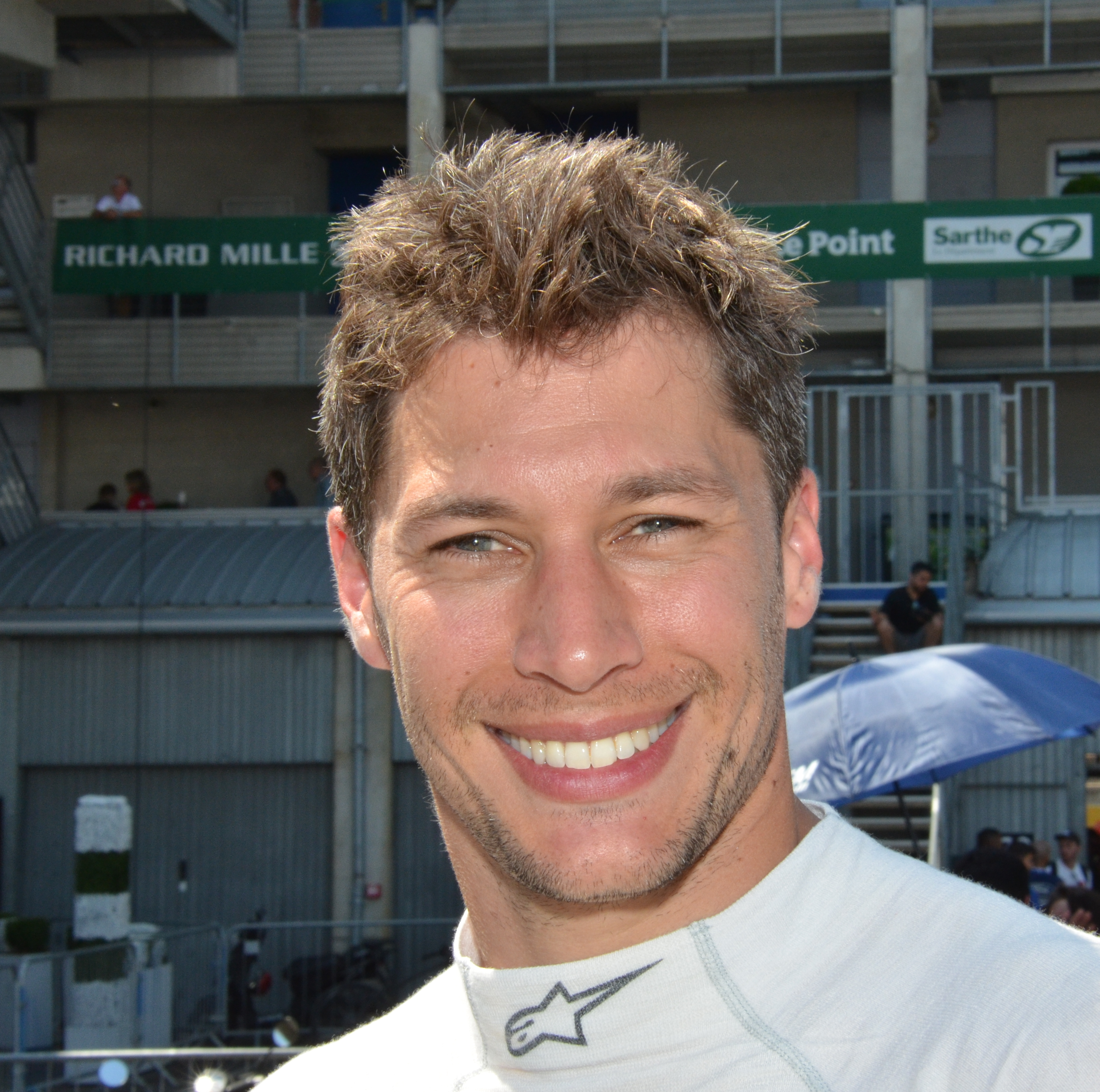
Loïc Duval (pictured in 2018) recorded the fastest overall lap time in practice

The second practice session was delayed for an hour because of an electrical thunderstorm that caused localised flooding around the circuit and it also prevented trackside marshals from taking up their posts due to local bylaws governing safety. Once the rain had abated enough to allow for cars to circulate the track, the session commenced and several drivers reported aquaplaning over the multiple heavy puddles that had formed on the circuit. The first red flag came out after seventeen minutes when Rigon beached the No. 71 AF Corse Ferrari off course between turns 17 and 18. The car was recovered back to the pit lane. After the restart, the rain let up and Davidson's No. 8 Toyota recorded the best lap of the session with a time of 2 minutes and 1.333 seconds. Kristensen placed the No. 1 Audi in second and Wurz's No. 7 Toyota was third. In LMP2, the No. 47 KCMG of Bradley was fastest with a time of 2 minutes and 17 seconds. Makowiecki topped the LMGTE Pro time sheets in Porsche Team Manthey's No. 92 and the No. 95 Aston Martin of Stanaway paced the LMGTE Am category.

In the final practice session, Kristensen put the No. 1 Audi at the top of the time sheets and Duval improved on his co-driver's form with a lap of 1 minute and 49.480 seconds. The No. 2 Audi of Fässler was second fastest and Toyota's No. 8 car of Davidson was third. The fastest Porsche was fourth courtesy of a lap from Neel Jani's No. 20 entry. Pla in the No. 26 was again the fastest driver in LMP2 with a lap of 1 minute and 56.601 seconds, eight-tenths of a second faster than Bradley's No. 47 KCMG vehicle. In LMGTE Pro, Aston Martin's No. 99 Vantage driven by Fernando Rees was quickest by four-hundredths of a second from the sister No. 97 entry of Stefan Mücke. Aston Martin was also the fastest manufacturer in LMGTE Am with Pedro Lamy's No. 98 Vantage from Paolo Ruberti in second place, driving the No. 90 8 Star Motorsports Ferrari.

== Qualifying ==
Friday's late afternoon qualification session was divided into two groups lasting 25 minutes each. Cars in LMGTE Pro and AM were sent out first and, after a five-minute interval, LMP1 and LMP2 vehicles drove on the track. All cars were required to be driven by two participants for one timed lap each, with the starting order determined by the competitors' fastest average times. The fastest qualifier was awarded one point which went towards the Drivers' and Manufacturers' Championships.

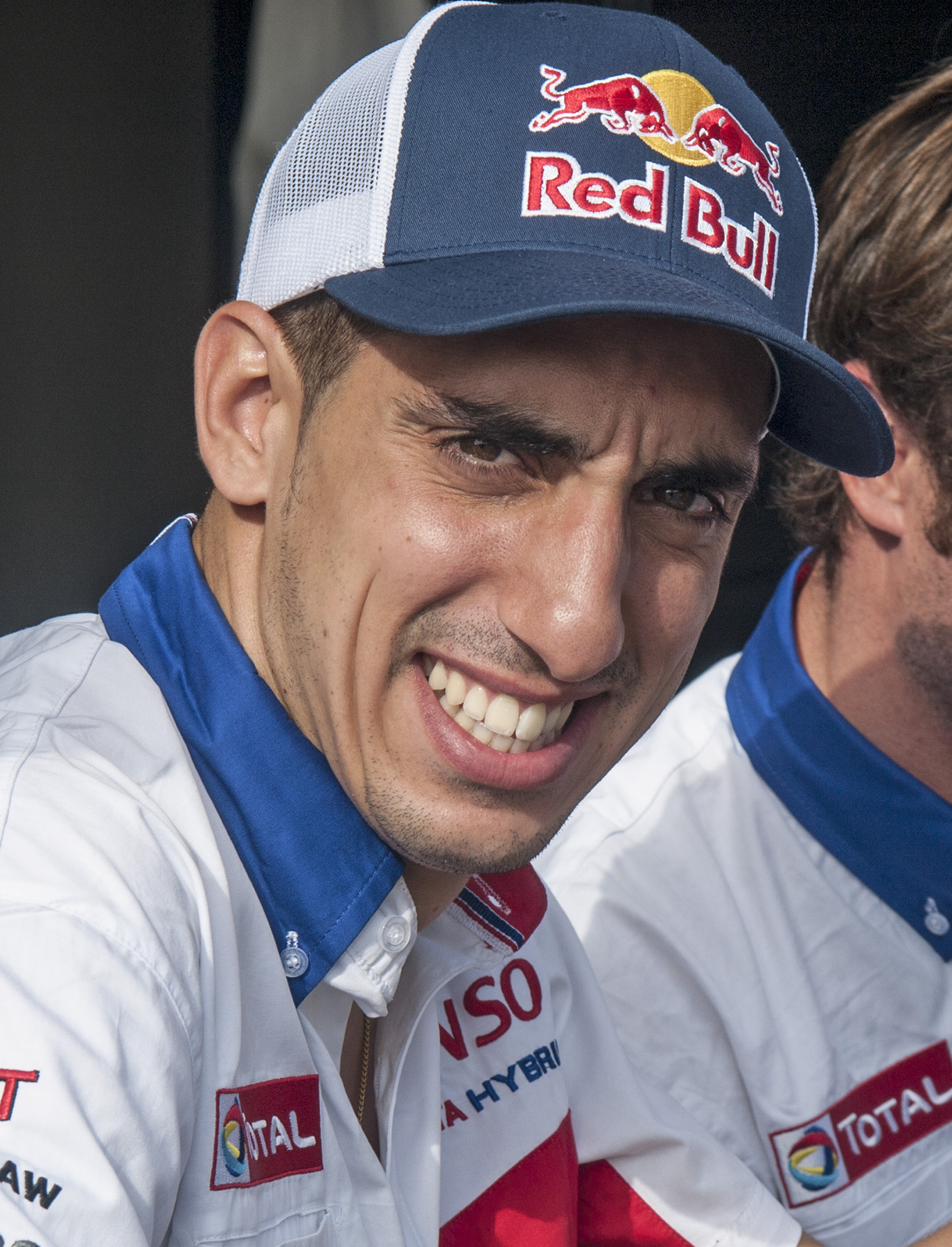
Sébastien Buemi helped Toyota take its third pole position of the season

Toyota chose to keep the No. 8 car in the garage before venturing onto the track with Davidson, who slid on a wet patch at turn 11 and aborted his first attempt. He subsequently set a lap time of 1 minute and 48.900 seconds and then recorded a 1-minute and 49.000 seconds effort. Buemi later relieved Davidson and his lap of 1 minute and 49.156 seconds gave the No. 8 entry a two-lap average effort of 1 minute and 49.093 seconds. This earned Buemi, Davidson and Lapierre their first pole position of 2014 and Toyota's third. They were joined on the grid's front row by Jani and Romain Dumas's No. 14 Porsche whose two-lap average was 1.190 seconds slower because Jani's best lap was disallowed transgressing energy recovery system limits that dictated the maximum amount of fuel each car could use. Hartley and Mark Webber qualified the No. 20 Porsche in third and Fässler and Lotterer put the No. 2 Audi in fourth from a second attempt by Fässler. Toyota's No. 7 car driven by Conway and Stéphane Sarrazin took fifth and di Grassi and Duval's No. 1 Audi completed the top ten after one of di Grassi's laps was deleted for violating energy recovery system limits because of a computer glitch. The LMP1-L class pole position was taken by Dominik Kraihamer and Fabio Leimer in the No. 12 Rebellion R-One with a two-lap average of 1 minute and 54.665 seconds, and was joined by the sister No. 13 entry of Heidfeld which stopped with a broken fly-by-wire throttle and halted the session for 4½ minutes. The No. 9 Lotus CLM P1/01 did not set a lap because of a gearbox selector failure although the team were granted dispensation to start the race but began one lap behind the rest of the field from the pit lane.

In LMP2, Roman Rusinov and Pla drove the No. 26 G-Drive Oreca to its third class pole position of the season and the team's second consecutive at the Circuit of the Americas with an average effort of 1 minutes and 58.075 seconds. Howson and Tsugio Matsuda joined them on the grid's front row in the No. 47 KCMG vehicle which was almost three-tenths of a second slower. The No. 30 Extreme Speed Motorsports HPD ARX-03b of Dalziel and Sharp began from third in the team's first World Endurance Championship race after Sharp appeared to struggle with the track conditions. Gianmaria Bruni and Toni Vilander, competing in AF Corse's No. 51 Ferrari, took the squad's fourth LMGTE Pro pole position in a row with a two-lap average effort of 2 minutes and 6.456 seconds, in a rain-affected session that made portions of the track dump. The two qualified 0.638 seconds in front of Mücke and Turner in the No. 97 Aston Martin. Makowiecki and Pilet's No. 92 Porsche Manthey car took third and their teammates Tandy and Bergmeister were fourth. Alex MacDowall and Rees' No. 99 Aston Martin completed the top five in class. Vaxivière was chosen to go a long stint and Emmanuel Collard drove on a drier track, enabling the duo to claim their first LMGTE Am pole position in the No. 75 ProSpeed Competition Porsche with a two-lap average time of 2 minutes and 8.271 seconds, less than a tenth of a second faster than Stanaway and Kristian Poulsen's No. 95 Aston Martin.

=== Qualifying results ===
Pole position winners in each class are marked in bold.

Final qualifying classification
Pos	Class	Team	Average Time	Gap	Grid
1	**LMP1-H**	**No. 8 Toyota Racing**	**1:49.093**	—	1
2	LMP1-H	No. 14 Porsche Team	1:50.283	+1.190	2
3	LMP1-H	No. 20 Porsche Team	1:50.302	+1.209	3
4	LMP1-H	No. 2 Audi Sport Team Joest	1:50.340	+1.247	4
5	LMP1-H	No. 7 Toyota Racing	1:50.363	+1.270	5
6	LMP1-H	No. 1 Audi Sport Team Joest	1:51.684	+2.591	6
7	**LMP1-L**	**No. 13 Rebellion Racing**	**1:54.665**	**+5.572**	7
8	**LMP2**	**No. 26 G-Drive Racing**	**1:56.075**	**+6.982**	8
9	LMP2	No. 47 KCMG	1:56.371	+7.278	9
10	LMP2	No. 30 Extreme Speed Motorsports	1:57.262	+8.169	10
11	LMP2	No. 27 SMP Racing	1:58.791	+9.698	11
12	**LMGTE Pro**	**No. 51 AF Corse**	**2:06.456**	**+17.363**	12
13	LMGTE Pro	No. 97 Aston Martin Racing	2:07.094	+18.001	13
14	LMGTE Pro	No. 92 Porsche Team Manthey	2:07.099	+18.006	14
15	LMGTE Pro	No. 91 Porsche Team Manthey	2:07.315	+18.222	15
16	LMGTE Pro	No. 99 Aston Martin Racing	2:07.850	+18.757	16
17	LMGTE Pro	No. 71 AF Corse	2:08.258	+19.165	17
18	**LMGTE Am**	**No. 75 Prospeed Competition**	**2:08.271**	**+19.178**	18
19	LMGTE Am	No. 95 Aston Martin Racing	2:08.367	+19.274	19
20	LMGTE Pro	No. 65 Corvette Racing	2:08.674	+19.581	20
21	LMGTE Am	No. 61 AF Corse	2:08.758	+19.665	21
22	LMGTE Am	No. 90 8 Star Motorsports	2:09.197	+20.104	22
23	LMGTE Am	No. 81 AF Corse	2:09.461	+20.368	23
24	LMGTE Am	No. 88 Proton Competition	2:09.704	+20.611	24
25	LMGTE Am	No. 98 Aston Martin Racing	2:12.271	+23.178	25
26	LMGTE Am	No. 57 Krohn Racing	2:13.349	+24.256	26
–	LMP1-L	No. 12 Rebellion Racing	No Time	—	27
–	LMP2	No. 37 SMP Racing	No Time	—	28
–	LMP1-L	No. 9 Lotus	No Time	—	29

== Race ==
Weather conditions at the start of the race were dry and clear. The air temperature ranged between 27 and 32 °C (81 and 90 °F) and the track temperature was between 28 and 38 °C (82 and 100 °F). It had a two-day attendance of 50,334 spectators. Buemi maintained the overall lead going into the first corner. He extended the No. 8 Toyota's lead to 40 seconds before he lost 13 seconds because he half-spun. That allowed the sister No. 7 Toyota to reduce the gap to Buemi as the Audis got ahead of both Porsches. With four hours and 41 minutes left, light rain was reported as falling in turn 11, and it then turned to a monsoon that flooded the track. Although drivers were circumspect en route to having wet-weather tyres installed in the pit lane, five of the six LMP1-H cars and several other vehicles from the other three categories aquaplaned off the track. That caused race officials to stop the race after an hour and 35 minutes, and most cars were ordered to stop on the start/finish straight. Race officials allowed open-cockpit vehicles to be covered, and teams were permitted to demist their cars windscreens for improved visibility.

Racing resumed 77 minutes later in safety car conditions and in fading light as some teams chose to make tyre changes. The change in positions meant both Audis led from the No. 14 Porsche and both Toyotas were a lap behind. The No. 2 Audi had been switched to the intermediate compound tyres after a strategy call from its race engineer Leena Gade, and the sister car was on dry compound tyres. Jani took the outright lead but a lack of engine power put his No. 14 Porsche behind Audi's No. 2 car of Fässler and later Lotterer.

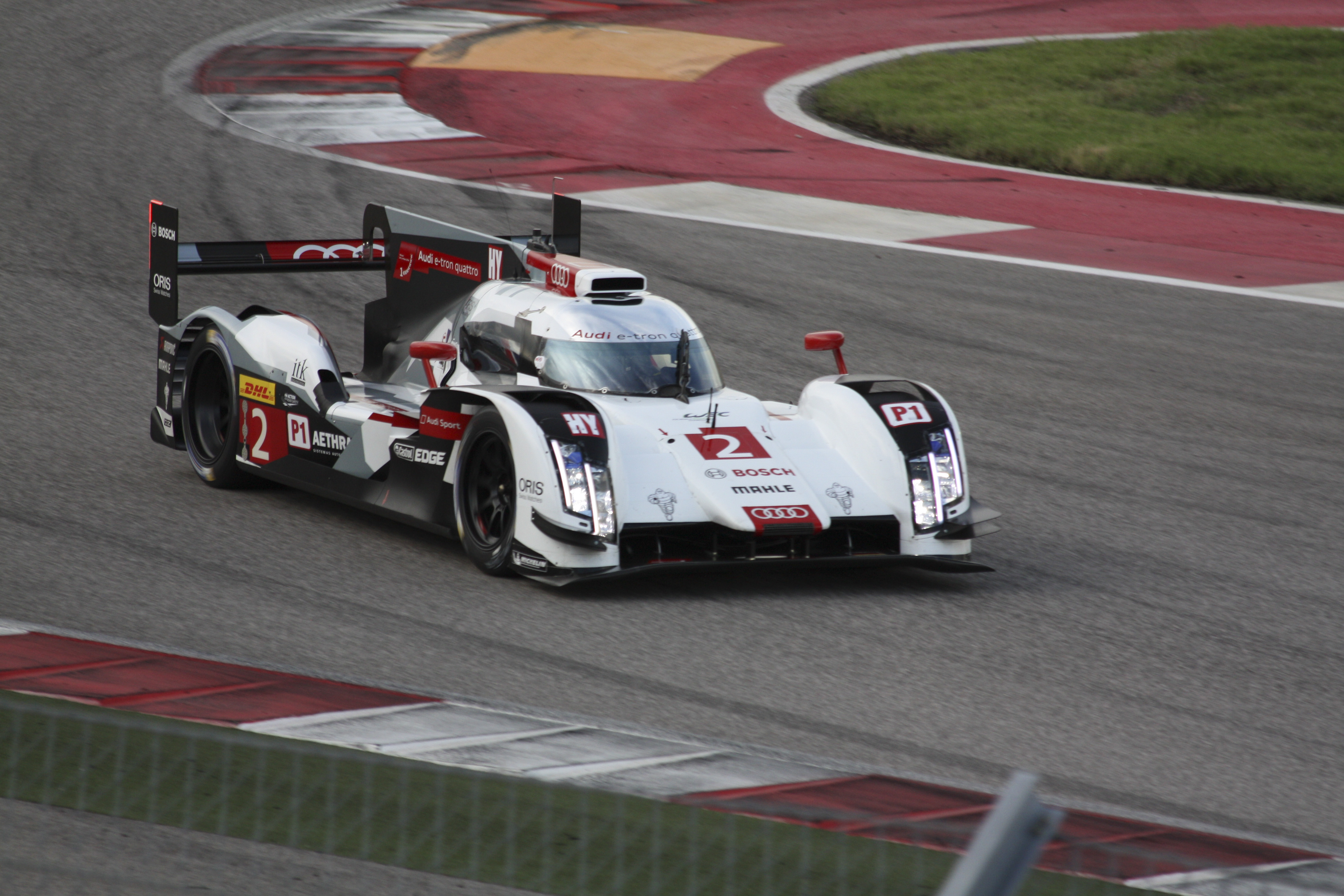
The race-winning No. 2 Audi car

After establishing large enough of an advantage, a final pit stop for fuel for Fässler allowed the No. 2 Audi to win the entry's second consecutive win of the season after the 24 Hours of Le Mans. He was 53 seconds in front of di Grassi's No. 1 car in second and Buemi took the No. 8 Toyota to complete the outright podium in third. LMP1-L was dominated by Rebellion's No. 12 car ran without trouble and took the class victory. KCMG won a race-long battle between Extreme Speed Motorsports, SMP Racing and G-Drive and took its first class victory in the World Endurance Championship with the No. 47 Oreca. Aston Martin took both GTE classes with the No. 97 car winning in Pro and 98 entry took the Am class honours.

=== Race results ===
Class winners in bold.

Final race classification
Pos	Class	No	Team	Drivers	Chassis	Tyre	Laps	Time/Retired
Pos	Class	No	Team	Drivers	Engine	Tyre	Laps	Time/Retired
1	**LMP1-H**	**2**	**(Germany) Audi Sport Team Joest**	**(Germany) André Lotterer (Switzerland) Marcel Fässler (France) Benoît Tréluyer**	**Audi R18 e-tron quattro**	M	**157**	**6:01'52.122**
1	**LMP1-H**	**2**	**(Germany) Audi Sport Team Joest**	**(Germany) André Lotterer (Switzerland) Marcel Fässler (France) Benoît Tréluyer**	**Audi TDI 4.0 L Turbo V6 (Diesel)**	M	**157**	**6:01'52.122**
2	LMP1-H	1	(Germany) Audi Sport Team Joest	(Denmark) Tom Kristensen (France) Loïc Duval (Brazil) Lucas di Grassi	Audi R18 e-tron quattro	M	157	+53.016
2	LMP1-H	1	(Germany) Audi Sport Team Joest	(Denmark) Tom Kristensen (France) Loïc Duval (Brazil) Lucas di Grassi	Audi TDI 4.0 L Turbo V6 (Diesel)	M	157	+53.016
3	LMP1-H	8	(Japan) Toyota Racing	(United Kingdom) Anthony Davidson (Switzerland) Sébastien Buemi (France) Nicolas Lapierre	Toyota TS040 Hybrid	M	157	+1:03.945
3	LMP1-H	8	(Japan) Toyota Racing	(United Kingdom) Anthony Davidson (Switzerland) Sébastien Buemi (France) Nicolas Lapierre	Toyota 3.7 L V8	M	157	+1:03.945
4	LMP1-H	14	(Germany) Porsche Team	(Germany) Marc Lieb (France) Romain Dumas (Switzerland) Neel Jani	Porsche 919 Hybrid	M	156	+1 Lap
4	LMP1-H	14	(Germany) Porsche Team	(Germany) Marc Lieb (France) Romain Dumas (Switzerland) Neel Jani	Porsche 2.0 L Turbo V4	M	156	+1 Lap
5	LMP1-H	20	(Germany) Porsche Team	(Germany) Timo Bernhard (New Zealand) Brendon Hartley (Australia) Mark Webber	Porsche 919 Hybrid	M	155	+2 Laps
5	LMP1-H	20	(Germany) Porsche Team	(Germany) Timo Bernhard (New Zealand) Brendon Hartley (Australia) Mark Webber	Porsche 2.0 L Turbo V4	M	155	+2 Laps
6	LMP1-H	7	(Japan) Toyota Racing	(Austria) Alexander Wurz (France) Stéphane Sarrazin (United Kingdom) Mike Conway	Toyota TS040 Hybrid	M	155	+2 Laps
6	LMP1-H	7	(Japan) Toyota Racing	(Austria) Alexander Wurz (France) Stéphane Sarrazin (United Kingdom) Mike Conway	Toyota 3.7 L V8	M	155	+2 Laps
7	**LMP1-L**	**12**	**(Switzerland) Rebellion Racing**	**(France) Nicolas Prost (Germany) Nick Heidfeld (Switzerland) Mathias Beche**	**Rebellion R-One**	M	**149**	**+8 Laps**
7	**LMP1-L**	**12**	**(Switzerland) Rebellion Racing**	**(France) Nicolas Prost (Germany) Nick Heidfeld (Switzerland) Mathias Beche**	**Toyota RV8KLM 3.4 L V8**	M	**149**	**+8 Laps**
8	**LMP2**	**47**	**(Hong Kong) KCMG**	**(United Kingdom) Matthew Howson (United Kingdom) Richard Bradley (Japan) Tsugio Matsuda**	**Oreca 03R**	D	**145**	**+12 Laps**
8	**LMP2**	**47**	**(Hong Kong) KCMG**	**(United Kingdom) Matthew Howson (United Kingdom) Richard Bradley (Japan) Tsugio Matsuda**	**Nissan VK45DE 4.5 L V8**	D	**145**	**+12 Laps**
9	LMP2	27	(Russia) SMP Racing	(Russia) Sergey Zlobin (Italy) Maurizio Mediani (France) Nicolas Minassian	Oreca 03R	M	145	+12 Laps
9	LMP2	27	(Russia) SMP Racing	(Russia) Sergey Zlobin (Italy) Maurizio Mediani (France) Nicolas Minassian	Nissan VK45DE 4.5 L V8	M	145	+12 Laps
10	LMP2	30	(United States) Extreme Speed Motorsports	(United States) Scott Sharp (United States) Ed Brown (United Kingdom) Ryan Dalziel	HPD ARX-03b	D	141	+16 Laps
10	LMP2	30	(United States) Extreme Speed Motorsports	(United States) Scott Sharp (United States) Ed Brown (United Kingdom) Ryan Dalziel	Honda HR28TT 2.8 L Turbo V6	D	141	+16 Laps
11	**LMGTE; Pro**	**97**	**(United Kingdom) Aston Martin Racing**	**(United Kingdom) Darren Turner (Germany) Stefan Mücke**	**Aston Martin V8 Vantage GTE**	M	**141**	**+16 Laps**
11	**LMGTE; Pro**	**97**	**(United Kingdom) Aston Martin Racing**	**(United Kingdom) Darren Turner (Germany) Stefan Mücke**	**Aston Martin 4.5 L V8**	M	**141**	**+16 Laps**
12	LMGTE; Pro	92	(Germany) Porsche Team Manthey	(France) Patrick Pilet (France) Frédéric Makowiecki	Porsche 911 RSR	M	141	+16 Laps
12	LMGTE; Pro	92	(Germany) Porsche Team Manthey	(France) Patrick Pilet (France) Frédéric Makowiecki	Porsche 4.0 L Flat-6	M	141	+16 Laps
13	LMGTE; Pro	51	(Italy) AF Corse	(Italy) Gianmaria Bruni (Finland) Toni Vilander	Ferrari 458 Italia GT2	M	141	+16 Laps
13	LMGTE; Pro	51	(Italy) AF Corse	(Italy) Gianmaria Bruni (Finland) Toni Vilander	Ferrari 4.5 L V8	M	141	+16 Laps
14	LMP2	26	(Russia) G-Drive Racing	(Russia) Roman Rusinov (France) Olivier Pla (France) Julien Canal	Ligier JS P2	D	141	+16 Laps
14	LMP2	26	(Russia) G-Drive Racing	(Russia) Roman Rusinov (France) Olivier Pla (France) Julien Canal	Nissan VK45DE 4.5 L V8	D	141	+16 Laps
15	LMP1-L	9	(Romania) Lotus	(France) Christophe Bouchut (United Kingdom) James Rossiter (Austria) Lucas Auer	CLM P1/01	M	140	+17 Laps
15	LMP1-L	9	(Romania) Lotus	(France) Christophe Bouchut (United Kingdom) James Rossiter (Austria) Lucas Auer	AER P60 Turbo V6	M	140	+17 Laps
16	LMGTE; Pro	91	(Germany) Porsche Team Manthey	(Germany) Jörg Bergmeister (United Kingdom) Nick Tandy	Porsche 911 RSR	M	139	+18 Laps
16	LMGTE; Pro	91	(Germany) Porsche Team Manthey	(Germany) Jörg Bergmeister (United Kingdom) Nick Tandy	Porsche 4.0 L Flat-6	M	139	+18 Laps
17	**LMGTE; Am**	**98**	**(United Kingdom) Aston Martin Racing**	**(Canada) Paul Dalla Lana (Portugal) Pedro Lamy (Denmark) Christoffer Nygaard**	**Aston Martin V8 Vantage GTE**	M	**138**	**+19 Laps**
17	**LMGTE; Am**	**98**	**(United Kingdom) Aston Martin Racing**	**(Canada) Paul Dalla Lana (Portugal) Pedro Lamy (Denmark) Christoffer Nygaard**	**Aston Martin 4.5 L V8**	M	**138**	**+19 Laps**
18	LMGTE; Am	95	(United Kingdom) Aston Martin Racing	(Denmark) David Heinemeier Hansson (Denmark) Kristian Poulsen (New Zealand) Richie Stanaway	Aston Martin V8 Vantage GTE	M	138	+19 Laps
18	LMGTE; Am	95	(United Kingdom) Aston Martin Racing	(Denmark) David Heinemeier Hansson (Denmark) Kristian Poulsen (New Zealand) Richie Stanaway	Aston Martin 4.5 L V8	M	138	+19 Laps
19	LMGTE; Pro	71	(Italy) AF Corse	(Italy) Davide Rigon (United Kingdom) James Calado	Ferrari 458 Italia GT2	M	137	+20 Laps
19	LMGTE; Pro	71	(Italy) AF Corse	(Italy) Davide Rigon (United Kingdom) James Calado	Ferrari 4.5 L V8	M	137	+20 Laps
20	LMGTE; Am	88	(Germany) Proton Competition	(Germany) Christian Ried (Austria) Klaus Bachler (United Arab Emirates) Khaled Al Qubaisi	Porsche 911 RSR	M	137	+20 Laps
20	LMGTE; Am	88	(Germany) Proton Competition	(Germany) Christian Ried (Austria) Klaus Bachler (United Arab Emirates) Khaled Al Qubaisi	Porsche 4.0 L Flat-6	M	137	+20 Laps
21	LMGTE; Am	61	(Italy) AF Corse	(Argentina) Luís Pérez Companc (Italy) Marco Cioci (Italy) Mirko Venturi	Ferrari 458 Italia GT2	M	137	+20 Laps
21	LMGTE; Am	61	(Italy) AF Corse	(Argentina) Luís Pérez Companc (Italy) Marco Cioci (Italy) Mirko Venturi	Ferrari 4.5 L V8	M	137	+20 Laps
22	LMGTE; Pro	99	(United Kingdom) Aston Martin Racing	(Hong Kong) Darryl O'Young (United Kingdom) Alex MacDowall (Brazil) Fernando Rees	Aston Martin V8 Vantage GTE	M	137	+20 Laps
22	LMGTE; Pro	99	(United Kingdom) Aston Martin Racing	(Hong Kong) Darryl O'Young (United Kingdom) Alex MacDowall (Brazil) Fernando Rees	Aston Martin 4.5 L V8	M	137	+20 Laps
23	LMGTE; Am	90	(United States) 8 Star Motorsports	(United States) Jeff Segal (Italy) Paolo Ruberti (Italy) Gianluca Roda	Ferrari 458 Italia GT2	M	136	+21 Laps
23	LMGTE; Am	90	(United States) 8 Star Motorsports	(United States) Jeff Segal (Italy) Paolo Ruberti (Italy) Gianluca Roda	Ferrari 4.5 L V8	M	136	+21 Laps
24	LMGTE; Pro	65	(United States) Corvette Racing	(United States) Tommy Milner (United States) Ricky Taylor (United States) Jordan Taylor	Chevrolet Corvette C7.R	M	135	+22 Laps
24	LMGTE; Pro	65	(United States) Corvette Racing	(United States) Tommy Milner (United States) Ricky Taylor (United States) Jordan Taylor	Chevrolet LT5.5 5.5 L V8	M	135	+22 Laps
25	LMGTE; Am	57	(United States) Krohn Racing	(United States) Tracy Krohn (Sweden) Niclas Jönsson (United Kingdom) Ben Collins	Ferrari 458 Italia GT2	M	135	+22 Laps
25	LMGTE; Am	57	(United States) Krohn Racing	(United States) Tracy Krohn (Sweden) Niclas Jönsson (United Kingdom) Ben Collins	Ferrari 4.5 L V8	M	135	+22 Laps
26	LMGTE; Am	81	(Italy) AF Corse	(Australia) Stephen Wyatt (Italy) Michele Rugolo (Italy) Andrea Bertolini	Ferrari 458 Italia GT2	M	133	+24 Laps
26	LMGTE; Am	81	(Italy) AF Corse	(Australia) Stephen Wyatt (Italy) Michele Rugolo (Italy) Andrea Bertolini	Ferrari 4.5 L V8	M	133	+24 Laps
27	LMGTE; Am	75	(Belgium) Prospeed Competition	(France) François Perrodo (France) Matthieu Vaxivière (France) Emmanuel Collard	Porsche 911 RSR	M	111	+46 Laps
27	LMGTE; Am	75	(Belgium) Prospeed Competition	(France) François Perrodo (France) Matthieu Vaxivière (France) Emmanuel Collard	Porsche 4.0 L Flat-6	M	111	+46 Laps
DNF	LMP1-L	13	(Switzerland) Rebellion Racing	(Austria) Dominik Kraihamer (Italy) Andrea Belicchi (Switzerland) Fabio Leimer	Rebellion R-One	M	88	Accident
DNF	LMP1-L	13	(Switzerland) Rebellion Racing	(Austria) Dominik Kraihamer (Italy) Andrea Belicchi (Switzerland) Fabio Leimer	Toyota RV8KLM 3.4 L V8	M	88	Accident
DNF	LMP2	37	(Russia) SMP Racing	(Russia) Kirill Ladygin (Russia) Anton Ladygin (Russia) Viktor Shaitar	Oreca 03R	M	75	Retired
DNF	LMP2	37	(Russia) SMP Racing	(Russia) Kirill Ladygin (Russia) Anton Ladygin (Russia) Viktor Shaitar	Nissan VK45DE 4.5 L V8	M	75	Retired

Tyre manufacturers
Key
Symbol	Tyre manufacturer
**D**	Dunlop
**M**	Michelin

== Standings after the race ==
The result of the race meant Davidson, Lapierre and Buemi kept their lead in the Drivers' Championship to 96 points, but their advantage over Lotterer, Fässler and Tréluyer was reduced to eleven points. Di Grassi and Kristensen remained in the third position with 72 points. Beche, Heidfeld and Prost maintained fourth with 48 points and Dumas, Jani and Marc Lieb rounded out the top five with 45 points. In the Manufacturers' Championship, Audi (with 157 points) took the lead from Toyota (139 points) while Porsche remained in third with 82 points with four races left in the season.

World Endurance Drivers' Championship standings
Pos.	+/–	Driver	Points
1		(United Kingdom) Anthony Davidson (France) Nicolas Lapierre (Switzerland) Sébastien Buemi	96
2		(Germany) André Lotterer (France) Benoît Tréluyer (Switzerland) Marcel Fässler	85
3		(Brazil) Lucas di Grassi (Denmark) Tom Kristensen	72
4		(Switzerland) Mathias Beche (France) Nicolas Prost (Germany) Nick Heidfeld	48
5	2	(France) Romain Dumas (Switzerland) Neel Jani (Germany) Marc Lieb	45

World Endurance Manufacturers' Championship standings
Pos.	+/–	Constructor	Points
1	1	(Germany) Audi	157
2		(Japan) Toyota	135
3		(Germany) Porsche	82

- Note: Only the top five positions are included for the Drivers' Championship standings.

FIA World Endurance Championship
Previous race: 24 Hours of Le Mans	2014 season	Next race: 6 Hours of Fuji
