= 2014 6 Hours of Bahrain =

2014 sports car racing event

Coordinates: 26°1′57″N 50°30′38″E

Event information
- Round 7 of 8 in the 2014 FIA World Endurance Championship
- Date: 15 November 2014
- Location: Sakhir
- Venue: Bahrain International Circuit
- Duration: 6 Hours

Results
- Laps completed: 195
- Distance (km): 1055.34
- Distance (miles): 655.785
- LMP1-H

Pole position
- Time: 1:43.145
- Team: (Germany) Porsche Team

Winners
- Team: (Japan) Toyota Racing
- Drivers: (Austria) Alexander Wurz (France) Stéphane Sarrazin (United Kingdom) Mike Conway
- LMP1-L

Winners
- Team: (Switzerland) Rebellion Racing
- Drivers: (Italy) Andrea Belicchi (Austria) Dominik Kraihamer (Switzerland) Fabio Leimer
- LMP2

Winners
- Team: (Hong Kong) KCMG
- Drivers: (United Kingdom) Richard Bradley (United Kingdom) Matthew Howson (Switzerland) Alexandre Imperatori
- LMGTE Pro

Winners
- Team: (Italy) AF Corse
- Drivers: (Italy) Gianmaria Bruni (Finland) Toni Vilander
- LMGTE Am

Winners
- Team: (United Kingdom) Aston Martin Racing
- Drivers: (Denmark) David Heinemeier Hansson (Denmark) Kristian Poulsen (Denmark) Nicki Thiim

The 2014 6 Hours of Bahrain was an endurance sports car racing event held on the Grand Prix Circuit, of the Bahrain International Circuit, Sakhir, Bahrain from 13 to 15 November 2014, and served as the seventh, and penultimate race of the 2014 FIA World Endurance Championship season. The race was won by Alexander Wurz, Stéphane Sarrazin and Mike Conway driving the No. 7 Toyota TS040 Hybrid car. Their team-mates Sébastien Buemi and Anthony Davidson secured the World Endurance Drivers' Championship at the event after finishing in 11th place.

== Qualifying ==
=== Qualifying result ===
Pole position winners in each class are marked in bold.

Pos	Class	Team	Average Time	Grid
1	**LMP1-H**	**No. 14 Porsche Team**	**1:43.145**	1
2	LMP1-H	No. 8 Toyota Racing	1:43.410	2
3	LMP1-H	No. 20 Porsche Team	1:44.191	3
4	LMP1-H	No. 7 Toyota Racing	1:44.260	4
5	LMP1-H	No. 2 Audi Sport Team Joest	1:45.599	5
6	**LMP1-L**	**No. 12 Rebellion Racing**	**1:47.047**	6
7	LMP1-L	No. 13 Rebellion Racing	1:47.705	7
8	**LMP2**	**No. 26 G-Drive Racing**	**1:50.236**	8
9	LMP2	No. 27 SMP Racing	1:50.939	9
10	LMP2	No. 37 SMP Racing	1:51.019	10
11	LMP1-L	No. 9 Lotus	1:51.213	11
12	LMP2	No. 47 KCMG	1:51.375	13
13	LMP2	No. 35 OAK Racing	1:54.304	14
14	**LMGTE Pro**	**No. 97 Aston Martin Racing**	**1:58.805**	15
15	LMGTE Pro	No. 51 AF Corse	1:59.075	16
16	LMGTE Pro	No. 71 AF Corse	1:59.226	17
17	LMGTE Pro	No. 99 Aston Martin Racing	1:59.377	18
18	LMGTE Pro	No. 91 Porsche Team Manthey	1:59.541	19
19	**LMGTE Am**	**No. 95 Aston Martin Racing**	**1:59.589**	20
20	LMGTE Am	No. 98 Aston Martin Racing	1:59.721	21
21	LMGTE Pro	No. 92 Porsche Team Manthey	1:59.772	22
22	LMGTE Am	No. 61 AF Corse	2:00.068	22
23	LMGTE Am	No. 90 8 Star Motorsports	2:00.218	24
24	LMGTE Am	No. 75 Prospeed Competition	2:00.713	25
25	LMGTE Am	No. 88 Proton Competition	2:01.131	26
26	LMGTE Am	No. 81 AF Corse	No Time	27
–	LMP1-H	No. 1 Audi Sport Team Joest	No Time	12

== Race ==
=== Race result ===
Class winners in bold.

Pos	Class	No	Team	Drivers	Chassis	Tyre	Laps	Time/Retired
Pos	Class	No	Team	Drivers	Engine	Tyre	Laps	Time/Retired
1	**LMP1-H**	**7**	**(Japan) Toyota Racing**	**(Austria) Alexander Wurz (France) Stéphane Sarrazin (United Kingdom) Mike Conway**	**Toyota TS040 Hybrid**	MI	**195**	**6:00:18.056‡**
1	**LMP1-H**	**7**	**(Japan) Toyota Racing**	**(Austria) Alexander Wurz (France) Stéphane Sarrazin (United Kingdom) Mike Conway**	**Toyota 3.7 L V8**	MI	**195**	**6:00:18.056‡**
2	LMP1-H	14	(Germany) Porsche Team	(Germany) Marc Lieb (France) Romain Dumas (Switzerland) Neel Jani	Porsche 919 Hybrid	MI	195	+50.460
2	LMP1-H	14	(Germany) Porsche Team	(Germany) Marc Lieb (France) Romain Dumas (Switzerland) Neel Jani	Porsche 2.0 L Turbo V4	MI	195	+50.460
3	LMP1-H	20	(Germany) Porsche Team	(Germany) Timo Bernhard (New Zealand) Brendon Hartley (Australia) Mark Webber	Porsche 919 Hybrid	MI	195	+57.268
3	LMP1-H	20	(Germany) Porsche Team	(Germany) Timo Bernhard (New Zealand) Brendon Hartley (Australia) Mark Webber	Porsche 2.0 L Turbo V4	MI	195	+57.268
4	LMP1-H	2	(Germany) Audi Sport Team Joest	(Germany) André Lotterer (Switzerland) Marcel Fässler (France) Benoît Tréluyer	Audi R18 e-tron quattro	MI	194	+1 Lap
4	LMP1-H	2	(Germany) Audi Sport Team Joest	(Germany) André Lotterer (Switzerland) Marcel Fässler (France) Benoît Tréluyer	Audi TDI 4.0 L Turbo V6 (Diesel)	MI	194	+1 Lap
5	LMP1-H	1	(Germany) Audi Sport Team Joest	(Denmark) Tom Kristensen (France) Loïc Duval (Brazil) Lucas di Grassi	Audi R18 e-tron quattro	MI	193	+2 Laps
5	LMP1-H	1	(Germany) Audi Sport Team Joest	(Denmark) Tom Kristensen (France) Loïc Duval (Brazil) Lucas di Grassi	Audi TDI 4.0 L Turbo V6 (Diesel)	MI	193	+2 Laps
6	**LMP1-L**	**13**	**(Switzerland) Rebellion Racing**	**(Austria) Dominik Kraihamer (Italy) Andrea Belicchi (Switzerland) Fabio Leimer**	**Rebellion R-One**	MI	**188**	**+7 Laps‡**
6	**LMP1-L**	**13**	**(Switzerland) Rebellion Racing**	**(Austria) Dominik Kraihamer (Italy) Andrea Belicchi (Switzerland) Fabio Leimer**	**Toyota RV8KLM 3.4 L V8**	MI	**188**	**+7 Laps‡**
7	LMP1-L	12	(Switzerland) Rebellion Racing	(France) Nicolas Prost (Germany) Nick Heidfeld (Switzerland) Mathias Beche	Rebellion R-One	MI	182	+13 Laps
7	LMP1-L	12	(Switzerland) Rebellion Racing	(France) Nicolas Prost (Germany) Nick Heidfeld (Switzerland) Mathias Beche	Toyota RV8KLM 3.4 L V8	MI	182	+13 Laps
8	**LMP2**	**47**	**(Hong Kong) KCMG**	**(United Kingdom) Matthew Howson (United Kingdom) Richard Bradley (Switzerland) Alexandre Imperatori**	**Oreca 03R**	D	**181**	**+14 Laps‡**
8	**LMP2**	**47**	**(Hong Kong) KCMG**	**(United Kingdom) Matthew Howson (United Kingdom) Richard Bradley (Switzerland) Alexandre Imperatori**	**Nissan VK45DE 4.5 L V8**	D	**181**	**+14 Laps‡**
9	LMP2	37	(Russia) SMP Racing	(Russia) Kirill Ladygin (Russia) Anton Ladygin (Russia) Viktor Shaitar	Oreca 03R	MI	178	+17 Laps
9	LMP2	37	(Russia) SMP Racing	(Russia) Kirill Ladygin (Russia) Anton Ladygin (Russia) Viktor Shaitar	Nissan VK45DE 4.5 L V8	MI	178	+17 Laps
10	LMP2	35	(France) OAK Racing	(United States) Mark Patterson (China) David Cheng (Japan) Keiko Ihara	Morgan LMP2	D	178	+17 Laps
10	LMP2	35	(France) OAK Racing	(United States) Mark Patterson (China) David Cheng (Japan) Keiko Ihara	Judd HK 3.6 L V8	D	178	+17 Laps
11	LMP1-H	8	(Japan) Toyota Racing	(United Kingdom) Anthony Davidson (Switzerland) Sébastien Buemi	Toyota TS040 Hybrid	MI	177	+18 Laps
11	LMP1-H	8	(Japan) Toyota Racing	(United Kingdom) Anthony Davidson (Switzerland) Sébastien Buemi	Toyota 3.7 L V8	MI	177	+18 Laps
12	LMP2	26	(Russia) G-Drive Racing	(Russia) Roman Rusinov (France) Olivier Pla (France) Julien Canal	Ligier JS P2	D	177	+18 Laps
12	LMP2	26	(Russia) G-Drive Racing	(Russia) Roman Rusinov (France) Olivier Pla (France) Julien Canal	Nissan VK45DE 4.5 L V8	D	177	+18 Laps
13	**LMGTE; Pro**	**51**	**(Italy) AF Corse**	**(Italy) Gianmaria Bruni (Finland) Toni Vilander**	**Ferrari 458 Italia GT2**	MI	**173**	**+22 Laps‡**
13	**LMGTE; Pro**	**51**	**(Italy) AF Corse**	**(Italy) Gianmaria Bruni (Finland) Toni Vilander**	**Ferrari 4.5 L V8**	MI	**173**	**+22 Laps‡**
14	LMGTE; Pro	97	(United Kingdom) Aston Martin Racing	(United Kingdom) Darren Turner (Germany) Stefan Mücke	Aston Martin V8 Vantage GTE	MI	173	+22 Laps
14	LMGTE; Pro	97	(United Kingdom) Aston Martin Racing	(United Kingdom) Darren Turner (Germany) Stefan Mücke	Aston Martin 4.5 L V8	MI	173	+22 Laps
15	LMGTE; Pro	71	(Italy) AF Corse	(Italy) Davide Rigon (United Kingdom) James Calado	Ferrari 458 Italia GT2	MI	173	+22 Laps
15	LMGTE; Pro	71	(Italy) AF Corse	(Italy) Davide Rigon (United Kingdom) James Calado	Ferrari 4.5 L V8	MI	173	+22 Laps
16	LMGTE; Pro	91	(Germany) Porsche Team Manthey	(Germany) Jörg Bergmeister (Austria) Richard Lietz	Porsche 911 RSR	MI	173	+22 Laps
16	LMGTE; Pro	91	(Germany) Porsche Team Manthey	(Germany) Jörg Bergmeister (Austria) Richard Lietz	Porsche 4.0 L Flat-6	MI	173	+22 Laps
17	LMGTE; Pro	92	(Germany) Porsche Team Manthey	(France) Patrick Pilet (France) Frédéric Makowiecki	Porsche 911 RSR	MI	172	+23 Laps
17	LMGTE; Pro	92	(Germany) Porsche Team Manthey	(France) Patrick Pilet (France) Frédéric Makowiecki	Porsche 4.0 L Flat-6	MI	172	+23 Laps
18	**LMGTE; Am**	**95**	**(United Kingdom) Aston Martin Racing**	**(Denmark) David Heinemeier Hansson (Denmark) Kristian Poulsen (Denmark) Nicki Thiim**	**Aston Martin V8 Vantage GTE**	MI	**172**	**+23 Laps‡**
18	**LMGTE; Am**	**95**	**(United Kingdom) Aston Martin Racing**	**(Denmark) David Heinemeier Hansson (Denmark) Kristian Poulsen (Denmark) Nicki Thiim**	**Aston Martin 4.5 L V8**	MI	**172**	**+23 Laps‡**
19	LMGTE; Am	81	(Italy) AF Corse	(Australia) Stephen Wyatt (Italy) Michele Rugolo (Italy) Andrea Bertolini	Ferrari 458 Italia GT2	MI	171	+24 Laps
19	LMGTE; Am	81	(Italy) AF Corse	(Australia) Stephen Wyatt (Italy) Michele Rugolo (Italy) Andrea Bertolini	Ferrari 4.5 L V8	MI	171	+24 Laps
20	LMGTE; Am	98	(United Kingdom) Aston Martin Racing	(Canada) Paul Dalla Lana (Portugal) Pedro Lamy (Denmark) Christoffer Nygaard	Aston Martin V8 Vantage GTE	MI	171	+24 Laps
20	LMGTE; Am	98	(United Kingdom) Aston Martin Racing	(Canada) Paul Dalla Lana (Portugal) Pedro Lamy (Denmark) Christoffer Nygaard	Aston Martin 4.5 L V8	MI	171	+24 Laps
21	LMGTE; Am	88	(Germany) Proton Competition	(Germany) Christian Ried (Germany) Wolf Henzler (United Arab Emirates) Khaled Al Qubaisi	Porsche 911 RSR	MI	170	+25 Laps
21	LMGTE; Am	88	(Germany) Proton Competition	(Germany) Christian Ried (Germany) Wolf Henzler (United Arab Emirates) Khaled Al Qubaisi	Porsche 4.0 L Flat-6	MI	170	+25 Laps
22	LMGTE; Am	90	(United States) 8 Star Motorsports	(Italy) Matteo Cressoni (Italy) Paolo Ruberti (Italy) Gianluca Roda	Ferrari 458 Italia GT2	MI	170	+25 Laps
22	LMGTE; Am	90	(United States) 8 Star Motorsports	(Italy) Matteo Cressoni (Italy) Paolo Ruberti (Italy) Gianluca Roda	Ferrari 4.5 L V8	MI	170	+25 Laps
23	LMGTE; Am	61	(Italy) AF Corse	(United States) Jeff Segal (Belarus) Alexander Talkanitsa (Italy) Alessandro Pier Guidi	Ferrari 458 Italia GT2	MI	170	+25 Laps
23	LMGTE; Am	61	(Italy) AF Corse	(United States) Jeff Segal (Belarus) Alexander Talkanitsa (Italy) Alessandro Pier Guidi	Ferrari 4.5 L V8	MI	170	+25 Laps
24	LMGTE; Pro	99	(United Kingdom) Aston Martin Racing	(Saudi Arabia) Abdulaziz Al Faisal (United Kingdom) Alex MacDowall (Brazil) Fernando Rees	Aston Martin V8 Vantage GTE	MI	170	+25 Laps
24	LMGTE; Pro	99	(United Kingdom) Aston Martin Racing	(Saudi Arabia) Abdulaziz Al Faisal (United Kingdom) Alex MacDowall (Brazil) Fernando Rees	Aston Martin 4.5 L V8	MI	170	+25 Laps
25	LMGTE; Am	75	(Belgium) Prospeed Competition	(France) François Perrodo (France) Matthieu Vaxivière (France) Emmanuel Collard	Porsche 911 RSR	MI	170	+25 Laps
25	LMGTE; Am	75	(Belgium) Prospeed Competition	(France) François Perrodo (France) Matthieu Vaxivière (France) Emmanuel Collard	Porsche 4.0 L Flat-6	MI	170	+25 Laps
DNF	LMP2	27	(Russia) SMP Racing	(Russia) Sergey Zlobin (Italy) Maurizio Mediani (France) Nicolas Minassian	Oreca 03R	MI	171	Did Not Finish
DNF	LMP2	27	(Russia) SMP Racing	(Russia) Sergey Zlobin (Italy) Maurizio Mediani (France) Nicolas Minassian	Nissan VK45DE 4.5 L V8	MI	171	Did Not Finish
DNF	LMP1-L	9	(Romania) Lotus	(Switzerland) Simon Trummer (Germany) Pierre Kaffer (France) Nathanaël Berthon	CLM P1/01	MI	1	Did Not Finish
DNF	LMP1-L	9	(Romania) Lotus	(Switzerland) Simon Trummer (Germany) Pierre Kaffer (France) Nathanaël Berthon	AER P60 Turbo V6	MI	1	Did Not Finish

Tyre manufacturers
Key
Symbol	Tyre manufacturer
**D**	Dunlop
**MI**	Michelin

FIA World Endurance Championship
Previous race: 6 Hours of Shanghai	2014 season	Next race: 6 Hours of São Paulo
