= 2014 6 Hours of São Paulo =

Sports car endurance race held at Autódromo José Carlos Pace, São Paulo

Coordinates: 23°42′13″S 46°41′59″W

(Brazil) 2014 6 Hours of São Paulo
Event information
- Round 8 of 8 in the 2014 FIA World Endurance Championship
- Date: 30 November 2014
- Location: São Paulo
- Venue: Autódromo José Carlos Pace
- Duration: 6 Hours

Results
- Laps completed: 249
- Distance (km): 1072.941
- Distance (miles): 666.573
- LMP1-H

Pole position
- Time: 1:17.676
- Team: (Germany) Porsche Team

Winners
- Team: (Germany) Porsche Team
- Drivers: (France) Romain Dumas (Switzerland) Neel Jani (Germany) Marc Lieb
- LMP1-L

Winners
- Team: (Switzerland) Rebellion Racing
- Drivers: (Italy) Andrea Belicchi (Austria) Dominik Kraihamer (Switzerland) Fabio Leimer
- LMP2

Winners
- Team: (Hong Kong) KCMG
- Drivers: (United Kingdom) Richard Bradley (United Kingdom) Matthew Howson (Switzerland) Alexandre Imperatori
- LMGTE Pro

Winners
- Team: (United Kingdom) Aston Martin Racing
- Drivers: (Germany) Stefan Mücke (United Kingdom) Darren Turner
- LMGTE Am

Winners
- Team: (United Kingdom) Aston Martin Racing
- Drivers: (Canada) Paul Dalla Lana (Portugal) Pedro Lamy (Denmark) Christoffer Nygaard

The 2014 6 Hours of São Paulo was an endurance sports car racing event held at the Autódromo José Carlos Pace, São Paulo, Brazil on 28–30 November 2014, and served as the eighth and last race of the 2014 FIA World Endurance Championship season.

== Qualifying ==
=== Qualifying result ===
Pole position winners in each class are marked in bold.

Pos	Class	Team	Average Time	Grid
1	**LMP1-H**	**No. 20 Porsche Team**	**1:17.676**	1
2	LMP1-H	No. 14 Porsche Team	1:17.783	2
3	LMP1-H	No. 8 Toyota Racing	1:18.070	3
4	LMP1-H	No. 2 Audi Sport Team Joest	1:18.889	4
5	LMP1-H	No. 7 Toyota Racing	1:18.920	5
6	LMP1-H	No. 1 Audi Sport Team Joest	1:18.983	6
7	**LMP1-L**	**No. 12 Rebellion Racing**	**1:21.127**	7
8	LMP1-L	No. 13 Rebellion Racing	1:21.644	8
9	LMP1-L	No. 9 Lotus	1:22.081	9
10	**LMP2**	**No. 26 G-Drive Racing**	**1:24.463**	10
11	LMP2	No. 47 KCMG	1:24.483	11
12	LMP2	No. 37 SMP Racing	1:25.256	12
13	LMP2	No. 27 SMP Racing	1:25.400	13
14	**LMGTE Pro**	**No. 97 Aston Martin Racing**	**1:30.111**	14
15	LMGTE Pro	No. 92 Porsche Team Manthey	1:30.259	15
16	LMGTE Pro	No. 99 Aston Martin Racing	1:30.312	16
17	**LMGTE Am**	**No. 98 Aston Martin Racing**	**1:30.401**	17
18	LMGTE Am	No. 95 Aston Martin Racing	1:30.493	18
19	LMGTE Pro	No. 91 Porsche Team Manthey	1:30.536	19
20	LMGTE Pro	No. 71 AF Corse	1:30.565	20
21	LMGTE Am	No. 81 AF Corse	1:30.882	21
22	LMGTE Pro	No. 51 AF Corse	1:30.908	22
23	LMGTE Am	No. 61 AF Corse	1:31.057	23
24	LMGTE Am	No. 90 8 Star Motorsports	1:31.483	24
25	LMGTE Am	No. 75 Prospeed Competition	1:31.511	25
26	LMGTE Am	No. 88 Proton Competition	1:34.865	26

== Race ==
=== Race result ===
Class winners in bold.

Final race classification
Pos	Class	No.	Team	Drivers	Chassis	Tyre	Laps	Time/Retired
Pos	Class	No.	Team	Drivers	Engine	Tyre	Laps	Time/Retired
1	**LMP1-H**	**14**	**(Germany) Porsche Team**	**(France) Romain Dumas (Switzerland) Neel Jani (Germany) Marc Lieb**	**Porsche 919 Hybrid**	MI	**249**	**06:01.44.608**
1	**LMP1-H**	**14**	**(Germany) Porsche Team**	**(France) Romain Dumas (Switzerland) Neel Jani (Germany) Marc Lieb**	**Porsche 2.0 L Turbo V4**	MI	**249**	**06:01.44.608**
2	LMP1-H	8	(Japan) Toyota Racing	(United Kingdom) Anthony Davidson (Switzerland) Sébastien Buemi	Toyota TS040 Hybrid	MI	249	+0.170
2	LMP1-H	8	(Japan) Toyota Racing	(United Kingdom) Anthony Davidson (Switzerland) Sébastien Buemi	Toyota 3.7 L V8	MI	249	+0.170
3	LMP1-H	1	(Germany) Audi Sport Team Joest	(Brazil) Lucas di Grassi (France) Loïc Duval (Denmark) Tom Kristensen	Audi R18 e-tron quattro	MI	248	+1 Lap
3	LMP1-H	1	(Germany) Audi Sport Team Joest	(Brazil) Lucas di Grassi (France) Loïc Duval (Denmark) Tom Kristensen	Audi TDI 4.0 L Turbo V6 (Diesel)	MI	248	+1 Lap
4	LMP1-H	7	(Japan) Toyota Racing	(Austria) Alexander Wurz (France) Stéphane Sarrazin (United Kingdom) Mike Conway	Toyota TS040 Hybrid	MI	248	+1 Lap
4	LMP1-H	7	(Japan) Toyota Racing	(Austria) Alexander Wurz (France) Stéphane Sarrazin (United Kingdom) Mike Conway	Toyota 3.7 L V8	MI	248	+1 Lap
5	LMP1-H	2	(Germany) Audi Sport Team Joest	(Switzerland) Marcel Fässler (Germany) André Lotterer (France) Benoît Tréluyer	Audi R18 e-tron quattro	MI	248	+1 Lap
5	LMP1-H	2	(Germany) Audi Sport Team Joest	(Switzerland) Marcel Fässler (Germany) André Lotterer (France) Benoît Tréluyer	Audi TDI 4.0 L Turbo V6 (Diesel)	MI	248	+1 Lap
6	**LMP2**	**47**	**(Hong Kong) KCMG**	**(United Kingdom) Matthew Howson (United Kingdom) Richard Bradley (Switzerland) Alexandre Imperatori**	**Oreca 03R**	D	**225**	**+24 Laps**
6	**LMP2**	**47**	**(Hong Kong) KCMG**	**(United Kingdom) Matthew Howson (United Kingdom) Richard Bradley (Switzerland) Alexandre Imperatori**	**Nissan VK45DE 4.5 L V8**	D	**225**	**+24 Laps**
7	**LMGTE; Pro**	**97**	**(United Kingdom) Aston Martin Racing**	**(United Kingdom) Darren Turner (Germany) Stefan Mücke**	**Aston Martin V8 Vantage GTE**	MI	**221**	**+28 Laps**
7	**LMGTE; Pro**	**97**	**(United Kingdom) Aston Martin Racing**	**(United Kingdom) Darren Turner (Germany) Stefan Mücke**	**Aston Martin 4.5 L V8**	MI	**221**	**+28 Laps**
8	LMGTE; Pro	92	(Germany) Porsche Team Manthey	(France) Frédéric Makowiecki (France) Patrick Pilet	Porsche 911 RSR	MI	221	+28 Laps
8	LMGTE; Pro	92	(Germany) Porsche Team Manthey	(France) Frédéric Makowiecki (France) Patrick Pilet	Porsche 4.0 L Flat-6	MI	221	+28 Laps
9	LMGTE; Pro	71	(Italy) AF Corse	(Italy) Davide Rigon (United Kingdom) James Calado	Ferrari 458 Italia GT2	MI	221	+28 Laps
9	LMGTE; Pro	71	(Italy) AF Corse	(Italy) Davide Rigon (United Kingdom) James Calado	Ferrari 4.5 L V8	MI	221	+28 Laps
10	LMGTE; Pro	51	(Italy) AF Corse	(Italy) Gianmaria Bruni (Finland) Toni Vilander	Ferrari 458 Italia GT2	MI	220	+29 Laps
10	LMGTE; Pro	51	(Italy) AF Corse	(Italy) Gianmaria Bruni (Finland) Toni Vilander	Ferrari 4.5 L V8	MI	220	+29 Laps
11	LMGTE; Pro	99	(United Kingdom) Aston Martin Racing	(United Kingdom) Alex MacDowall (Hong Kong) Darryl O'Young (Brazil) Fernando Rees	Aston Martin V8 Vantage GTE	MI	220	+29 Laps
11	LMGTE; Pro	99	(United Kingdom) Aston Martin Racing	(United Kingdom) Alex MacDowall (Hong Kong) Darryl O'Young (Brazil) Fernando Rees	Aston Martin 4.5 L V8	MI	220	+29 Laps
12	LMGTE; Pro	91	(Germany) Porsche Team Manthey	(Germany) Jörg Bergmeister (Austria) Richard Lietz	Porsche 911 RSR	MI	220	+29 Laps
12	LMGTE; Pro	91	(Germany) Porsche Team Manthey	(Germany) Jörg Bergmeister (Austria) Richard Lietz	Porsche 4.0 L Flat-6	MI	220	+29 Laps
13	**LMGTE; Am**	**98**	**(United Kingdom) Aston Martin Racing**	**(Canada) Paul Dalla Lana (Portugal) Pedro Lamy (Denmark) Christoffer Nygaard**	**Aston Martin V8 Vantage GTE**	MI	**219**	**+30 Laps**
13	**LMGTE; Am**	**98**	**(United Kingdom) Aston Martin Racing**	**(Canada) Paul Dalla Lana (Portugal) Pedro Lamy (Denmark) Christoffer Nygaard**	**Aston Martin 4.5 L V8**	MI	**219**	**+30 Laps**
14	LMGTE; Am	95	(United Kingdom) Aston Martin Racing	(Denmark) Kristian Poulsen (Denmark) David Heinemeier Hansson (Denmark) Nicki Thiim	Aston Martin V8 Vantage GTE	MI	219	+30 Laps
14	LMGTE; Am	95	(United Kingdom) Aston Martin Racing	(Denmark) Kristian Poulsen (Denmark) David Heinemeier Hansson (Denmark) Nicki Thiim	Aston Martin 4.5 L V8	MI	219	+30 Laps
15	LMGTE; Am	81	(Italy) AF Corse	(Australia) Stephen Wyatt (Italy) Michele Rugolo (Italy) Andrea Bertolini	Ferrari 458 Italia GT2	MI	219	+30 Laps
15	LMGTE; Am	81	(Italy) AF Corse	(Australia) Stephen Wyatt (Italy) Michele Rugolo (Italy) Andrea Bertolini	Ferrari 4.5 L V8	MI	219	+30 Laps
16	LMGTE; Am	88	(Germany) Proton Competition	(Germany) Christian Ried (Austria) Klaus Bachler (United Arab Emirates) Khaled Al Qubaisi	Porsche 911 RSR	MI	217	+32 Laps
16	LMGTE; Am	88	(Germany) Proton Competition	(Germany) Christian Ried (Austria) Klaus Bachler (United Arab Emirates) Khaled Al Qubaisi	Porsche 4.0 L Flat-6	MI	217	+32 Laps
17	LMGTE; Am	75	(Belgium) Prospeed Competition	(France) François Perrodo (France) Emmanuel Collard (France) Matthieu Vaxivière	Porsche 911 RSR	MI	217	+32 Laps
17	LMGTE; Am	75	(Belgium) Prospeed Competition	(France) François Perrodo (France) Emmanuel Collard (France) Matthieu Vaxivière	Porsche 4.0 L Flat-6	MI	217	+32 Laps
18	**LMP1-L**	**13**	**(Switzerland) Rebellion Racing**	**(Austria) Dominik Kraihamer (Italy) Andrea Belicchi (Switzerland) Fabio Leimer**	**Rebellion R-One**	MI	**214**	**+35 Laps**
18	**LMP1-L**	**13**	**(Switzerland) Rebellion Racing**	**(Austria) Dominik Kraihamer (Italy) Andrea Belicchi (Switzerland) Fabio Leimer**	**Toyota RV8KLM 3.4 L V8**	MI	**214**	**+35 Laps**
19	LMP1-L	12	(Switzerland) Rebellion Racing	(France) Nicolas Prost (Germany) Nick Heidfeld (Switzerland) Mathias Beche	Rebellion R-One	MI	211	+38 Laps
19	LMP1-L	12	(Switzerland) Rebellion Racing	(France) Nicolas Prost (Germany) Nick Heidfeld (Switzerland) Mathias Beche	Toyota RV8KLM 3.4 L V8	MI	211	+38 Laps
20	LMP2	27	(Russia) SMP Racing	(Russia) Sergey Zlobin (France) Nicolas Minassian (Italy) Maurizio Mediani	Oreca 03R	MI	207	+42 Laps
20	LMP2	27	(Russia) SMP Racing	(Russia) Sergey Zlobin (France) Nicolas Minassian (Italy) Maurizio Mediani	Nissan VK45DE 4.5 L V8	MI	207	+42 Laps
21	LMGTE; Am	61	(Italy) AF Corse	(Brazil) Emerson Fittipaldi (Italy) Alessandro Pier Guidi (United States) Jeff Segal	Ferrari 458 Italia GT2	MI	186	+63 Laps
21	LMGTE; Am	61	(Italy) AF Corse	(Brazil) Emerson Fittipaldi (Italy) Alessandro Pier Guidi (United States) Jeff Segal	Ferrari 4.5 L V8	MI	186	+63 Laps
DNF	LMP1-H	20	(Germany) Porsche Team	(Germany) Timo Bernhard (Australia) Mark Webber (New Zealand) Brendon Hartley	Porsche 919 Hybrid	MI	236	Accident
DNF	LMP1-H	20	(Germany) Porsche Team	(Germany) Timo Bernhard (Australia) Mark Webber (New Zealand) Brendon Hartley	Porsche 2.0 L Turbo V4	MI	236	Accident
DNF	LMGTE; Am	90	(United States) 8 Star Motorsports	(Italy) Gianluca Roda (Italy) Paolo Ruberti (Italy) Matteo Cressoni	Ferrari 458 Italia GT2	MI	205	Accident
DNF	LMGTE; Am	90	(United States) 8 Star Motorsports	(Italy) Gianluca Roda (Italy) Paolo Ruberti (Italy) Matteo Cressoni	Ferrari 4.5 L V8	MI	205	Accident
DNF	LMP2	37	(Russia) SMP Racing	(Russia) Kirill Ladygin (Russia) Viktor Shaitar (Russia) Anton Ladygin	Oreca 03R	MI	136	Did Not Finish
DNF	LMP2	37	(Russia) SMP Racing	(Russia) Kirill Ladygin (Russia) Viktor Shaitar (Russia) Anton Ladygin	Nissan VK45DE 4.5 L V8	MI	136	Did Not Finish
DNF	LMP1-L	9	(Romania) Lotus	(Germany) Pierre Kaffer (Austria) Lucas Auer	CLM P1/01	MI	60	Did Not Finish
DNF	LMP1-L	9	(Romania) Lotus	(Germany) Pierre Kaffer (Austria) Lucas Auer	AER P60 Turbo V6	MI	60	Did Not Finish
DNF	LMP2	26	(Russia) G-Drive Racing	(Russia) Roman Rusinov (France) Olivier Pla (France) Julien Canal	Ligier JS P2	D	41	Did Not Finish
DNF	LMP2	26	(Russia) G-Drive Racing	(Russia) Roman Rusinov (France) Olivier Pla (France) Julien Canal	Nissan VK45DE 4.5 L V8	D	41	Did Not Finish

Tyre manufacturers
Key
Symbol	Tyre manufacturer
**D**	Dunlop
**MI**	Michelin

FIA World Endurance Championship
Previous race: 6 Hours of Bahrain	2014 season	Next race: None
