= 2016 6 Hours of Bahrain =

Sports car endurance race held at Bahrain International Circuit in Sakhir, Bahrain

Coordinates: 26°1′57″N 50°30′38″E

Event information
- Round 9 of 9 in the 2016 FIA World Endurance Championship
- Date: 19 November 2016
- Location: Sakhir
- Venue: Bahrain International Circuit
- Duration: 6 Hours

Results
- Laps completed: 201
- Distance (km): 1087.812
- Distance (miles): 675.963
- LMP1

Pole position
- Time: 1:39.207
- Team: (Germany) Audi Sport Team Joest

Winners
- Team: (Germany) Audi Sport Team Joest
- Drivers: (France) Loïc Duval (Brazil) Lucas di Grassi (United Kingdom) Oliver Jarvis
- LMP2

Winners
- Team: (Russia) G-Drive Racing
- Drivers: (Russia) Roman Rusinov (United Kingdom) Alex Brundle (United Kingdom) René Rast
- LMGTE Pro

Winners
- Team: (United Kingdom) Aston Martin Racing
- Drivers: (Denmark) Nicki Thiim (Denmark) Marco Sørensen
- LMGTE Am

Winners
- Team: (United Arab Emirates) Abu Dhabi-Proton Racing
- Drivers: (United Arab Emirates) Khaled Al Qubaisi (United States) Patrick Long (Denmark) David Heinemeier Hansson

The 2016 6 Hours of Bahrain was an endurance sports car racing event held on the Grand Prix Circuit of the Bahrain International Circuit, Sakhir, Bahrain on 17–19 November 2016, and served as the ninth and last race of the 2016 FIA World Endurance Championship. The race was won by the #8 Audi R18 of Loïc Duval, Lucas di Grassi and Oliver Jarvis, run by Audi Sport Team Joest.

== Qualifying ==
=== Qualifying result ===
Pole position in Class is in bold.

Pos	Class	Team	Average Time	Grid
1	**LMP1**	**No. 8 Audi Sport Team Joest**	**1:39.207**	**1**
2	LMP1	No. 1 Porsche Team	1:39.471	2
3	LMP1	No. 2 Porsche Team	1:39.669	3
4	LMP1	No. 7 Audi Sport Team Joest	1:39.698	4
5	LMP1	No. 6 Toyota Gazoo Racing	1:40.222	5
6	LMP1	No. 5 Toyota Gazoo Racing	1:40.776	6
7	LMP1	No. 13 Rebellion Racing	1:45.091	7
8	**LMP2**	**No. 36 Signatech Alpine**	**1:49.640**	**8**
9	LMP2	No. 44 Manor	1:50.034	9
10	LMP2	No. 43 RGR Sport by Morand	1:50.410	10
11	LMP2	No. 30 Extreme Speed Motorsports	1:50.685	11
12	LMP2	No. 45 Manor	1:50.800	12
13	LMP2	No. 31 Extreme Speed Motorsports	1:51.071	13
14	LMP2	No. 35 Baxi DC Racing Alpine	1:51.185	14
15	LMP2	No. 27 SMP Racing	1:51.427	15
16	LMP2	No. 37 SMP Racing	1:51.475	16
17	**LMGTE-Pro**	**No. 97 Aston Martin Racing**	**1:56.953**	**17**
18	LMGTE-Pro	No. 95 Aston Martin Racing	1:57.081	18
19	LMGTE-Pro	No. 51 AF Corse	1:57.380	19
20	LMGTE-Pro	No. 67 Ford Chip Ganassi Team UK	1:57.891	20
21	LMGTE-Pro	No. 71 AF Corse	1:58.201	21
22	LMGTE-Pro	No. 66 Ford Chip Ganassi Team UK	1:58.504	22
23	LMGTE-Pro	No. 77 Dempsey-Proton Racing	1:58.882	23
24	**LMGTE-Am**	**No. 98 Aston Martin Racing**	**1:59.879**	**24**
25	LMGTE-Am	No. 83 AF Corse	2:00.227	25
26	LMGTE-Am	No. 50 Larbre Compétition	2:00.938	26
27	LMGTE-Am	No. 86 Gulf Racing	2:02.112	27
28	LMGTE-Am	No. 78 KCMG	2:39.576	28
–	LMP1	No. 4 ByKolles Racing	No Time	29
–	LMGTE-Am	No. 88 Abu Dhabi-Proton Racing	No Time	30
–	LMP2	No. 26 G-Drive Racing	No Time^{1}	31

^1 – The No. 26 G-Drive Racing all laptimes deleted because of both its front brakes cooling ducts were not fitted with mesh.

== Race ==
=== Race result ===
The minimum number of laps for classification (70% of the overall winning car's race distance) was 141 laps. Class winners in bold.

Pos	Class	No	Team	Drivers	Chassis	Tyre	Laps
Pos	Class	No	Team	Drivers	Engine	Tyre	Laps
1	**LMP1**	**8**	**(Germany) Audi Sport Team Joest**	**(France) Loïc Duval (Brazil) Lucas di Grassi (United Kingdom) Oliver Jarvis**	**Audi R18**	M	**201**
1	**LMP1**	**8**	**(Germany) Audi Sport Team Joest**	**(France) Loïc Duval (Brazil) Lucas di Grassi (United Kingdom) Oliver Jarvis**	**Audi TDI 4.0 L Turbo Diesel V6**	M	**201**
2	LMP1	7	(Germany) Audi Sport Team Joest	(Germany) André Lotterer (Switzerland) Marcel Fässler (France) Benoît Tréluyer	Audi R18	M	201
2	LMP1	7	(Germany) Audi Sport Team Joest	(Germany) André Lotterer (Switzerland) Marcel Fässler (France) Benoît Tréluyer	Audi TDI 4.0 L Turbo Diesel V6	M	201
3	LMP1	1	(Germany) Porsche Team	(Germany) Timo Bernhard (New Zealand) Brendon Hartley (Australia) Mark Webber	Porsche 919 Hybrid	M	201
3	LMP1	1	(Germany) Porsche Team	(Germany) Timo Bernhard (New Zealand) Brendon Hartley (Australia) Mark Webber	Porsche 2.0 L Turbo V4	M	201
4	LMP1	5	(Japan) Toyota Gazoo Racing	(Switzerland) Sébastien Buemi (Japan) Kazuki Nakajima (United Kingdom) Anthony Davidson	Toyota TS050 Hybrid	M	200
4	LMP1	5	(Japan) Toyota Gazoo Racing	(Switzerland) Sébastien Buemi (Japan) Kazuki Nakajima (United Kingdom) Anthony Davidson	Toyota 2.4 L Turbo V6	M	200
5	LMP1	6	(Japan) Toyota Gazoo Racing	(France) Stéphane Sarrazin (United Kingdom) Mike Conway (Japan) Kamui Kobayashi	Toyota TS050 Hybrid	M	200
5	LMP1	6	(Japan) Toyota Gazoo Racing	(France) Stéphane Sarrazin (United Kingdom) Mike Conway (Japan) Kamui Kobayashi	Toyota 2.4 L Turbo V6	M	200
6	LMP1	2	(Germany) Porsche Team	(Germany) Marc Lieb (France) Romain Dumas (Switzerland) Neel Jani	Porsche 919 Hybrid	M	198
6	LMP1	2	(Germany) Porsche Team	(Germany) Marc Lieb (France) Romain Dumas (Switzerland) Neel Jani	Porsche 2.0 L Turbo V4	M	198
7	LMP1	13	(Switzerland) Rebellion Racing	(Austria) Dominik Kraihamer (Switzerland) Alexandre Imperatori (Switzerland) Mathéo Tuscher	Rebellion R-One	D	191
7	LMP1	13	(Switzerland) Rebellion Racing	(Austria) Dominik Kraihamer (Switzerland) Alexandre Imperatori (Switzerland) Mathéo Tuscher	AER P60 2.4 L Turbo V6	D	191
8	LMP1	4	(Austria) ByKolles Racing Team	(Switzerland) Simon Trummer (United Kingdom) Oliver Webb (Germany) Pierre Kaffer	CLM P1/01	D	187
8	LMP1	4	(Austria) ByKolles Racing Team	(Switzerland) Simon Trummer (United Kingdom) Oliver Webb (Germany) Pierre Kaffer	AER P60 2.4 L Turbo V6	D	187
9	**LMP2**	**26**	**(Russia) G-Drive Racing**	**(Russia) Roman Rusinov (United Kingdom) Alex Brundle (Germany) René Rast**	**Oreca 05**	D	**184**
9	**LMP2**	**26**	**(Russia) G-Drive Racing**	**(Russia) Roman Rusinov (United Kingdom) Alex Brundle (Germany) René Rast**	**Nissan VK45DE 4.5 L V8**	D	**184**
10	LMP2	43	(Mexico) RGR Sport by Morand	(Mexico) Ricardo González (Portugal) Filipe Albuquerque (Brazil) Bruno Senna	Ligier JS P2	D	184
10	LMP2	43	(Mexico) RGR Sport by Morand	(Mexico) Ricardo González (Portugal) Filipe Albuquerque (Brazil) Bruno Senna	Nissan VK45DE 4.5 L V8	D	184
11	LMP2	36	(France) Signatech Alpine	(France) Nicolas Lapierre (United States) Gustavo Menezes (Monaco) Stéphane Richelmi	Alpine A460	D	183
11	LMP2	36	(France) Signatech Alpine	(France) Nicolas Lapierre (United States) Gustavo Menezes (Monaco) Stéphane Richelmi	Nissan VK45DE 4.5 L V8	D	183
12	LMP2	31	(United States) Extreme Speed Motorsports	(United Kingdom) Ryan Dalziel (Canada) Chris Cumming (Brazil) Pipo Derani	Ligier JS P2	D	183
12	LMP2	31	(United States) Extreme Speed Motorsports	(United Kingdom) Ryan Dalziel (Canada) Chris Cumming (Brazil) Pipo Derani	Nissan VK45DE 4.5 L V8	D	183
13	LMP2	30	(United States) Extreme Speed Motorsports	(Indonesia) Sean Gelael (France) Tom Dillmann (Netherlands) Giedo van der Garde	Ligier JS P2	D	183
13	LMP2	30	(United States) Extreme Speed Motorsports	(Indonesia) Sean Gelael (France) Tom Dillmann (Netherlands) Giedo van der Garde	Nissan VK45DE 4.5 L V8	D	183
14	LMP2	35	(China) Baxi DC Racing Alpine	(United States) David Cheng (China) Ho-Pin Tung (France) Paul-Loup Chatin	Alpine A460	D	182
14	LMP2	35	(China) Baxi DC Racing Alpine	(United States) David Cheng (China) Ho-Pin Tung (France) Paul-Loup Chatin	Nissan VK45DE 4.5 L V8	D	182
15	LMP2	45	(United Kingdom) Manor	(Mexico) Roberto González (France) Julien Canal (Spain) Roberto Merhi	Oreca 05	D	182
15	LMP2	45	(United Kingdom) Manor	(Mexico) Roberto González (France) Julien Canal (Spain) Roberto Merhi	Nissan VK45DE 4.5 L V8	D	182
16	LMP2	37	(Russia) SMP Racing	(Russia) Vitaly Petrov (Russia) Viktor Shaytar (Russia) Kirill Ladygin	BR Engineering BR01	D	179
16	LMP2	37	(Russia) SMP Racing	(Russia) Vitaly Petrov (Russia) Viktor Shaytar (Russia) Kirill Ladygin	Nissan VK45DE 4.5 L V8	D	179
17	LMP2	27	(Russia) SMP Racing	(France) Nicolas Minassian (Italy) Maurizio Mediani (Russia) Mikhail Aleshin	BR Engineering BR01	D	176
17	LMP2	27	(Russia) SMP Racing	(France) Nicolas Minassian (Italy) Maurizio Mediani (Russia) Mikhail Aleshin	Nissan VK45DE 4.5 L V8	D	176
18	LMP2	44	(United Kingdom) Manor	(United Kingdom) Matt Rao (United Kingdom) Richard Bradley (United Kingdom) Alex Lynn	Oreca 05	D	175
18	LMP2	44	(United Kingdom) Manor	(United Kingdom) Matt Rao (United Kingdom) Richard Bradley (United Kingdom) Alex Lynn	Nissan VK45DE 4.5 L V8	D	175
19	**LMGTE; Pro**	**95**	**(United Kingdom) Aston Martin Racing**	**(Denmark) Nicki Thiim (Denmark) Marco Sørensen**	**Aston Martin V8 Vantage GTE**	D	**174**
19	**LMGTE; Pro**	**95**	**(United Kingdom) Aston Martin Racing**	**(Denmark) Nicki Thiim (Denmark) Marco Sørensen**	**Aston Martin 4.5 L V8**	D	**174**
20	LMGTE; Pro	51	(Italy) AF Corse	(Italy) Gianmaria Bruni (United Kingdom) James Calado	Ferrari 488 GTE	M	174
20	LMGTE; Pro	51	(Italy) AF Corse	(Italy) Gianmaria Bruni (United Kingdom) James Calado	Ferrari F154CB 3.9 L Turbo V8	M	174
21	LMGTE; Pro	71	(Italy) AF Corse	(Italy) Davide Rigon (United Kingdom) Sam Bird	Ferrari 488 GTE	M	173
21	LMGTE; Pro	71	(Italy) AF Corse	(Italy) Davide Rigon (United Kingdom) Sam Bird	Ferrari F154CB 3.9 L Turbo V8	M	173
22	LMGTE; Pro	67	(United States) Ford Chip Ganassi Team UK	(United Kingdom) Andy Priaulx (United Kingdom) Harry Tincknell	Ford GT	M	173
22	LMGTE; Pro	67	(United States) Ford Chip Ganassi Team UK	(United Kingdom) Andy Priaulx (United Kingdom) Harry Tincknell	Ford EcoBoost 3.5 L Turbo V6	M	173
23	LMGTE; Pro	97	(United Kingdom) Aston Martin Racing	(United Kingdom) Darren Turner (United Kingdom) Jonathan Adam	Aston Martin V8 Vantage GTE	D	173
23	LMGTE; Pro	97	(United Kingdom) Aston Martin Racing	(United Kingdom) Darren Turner (United Kingdom) Jonathan Adam	Aston Martin 4.5 L V8	D	173
24	LMGTE; Pro	66	(United States) Ford Chip Ganassi Team UK	(France) Olivier Pla (Germany) Stefan Mücke	Ford GT	M	172
24	LMGTE; Pro	66	(United States) Ford Chip Ganassi Team UK	(France) Olivier Pla (Germany) Stefan Mücke	Ford EcoBoost 3.5 L Turbo V6	M	172
25	LMGTE; Pro	77	(Germany) Dempsey-Proton Racing	(Austria) Richard Lietz (Denmark) Michael Christensen	Porsche 911 RSR	M	172
25	LMGTE; Pro	77	(Germany) Dempsey-Proton Racing	(Austria) Richard Lietz (Denmark) Michael Christensen	Porsche 4.0 L Flat-6	M	172
26	**LMGTE; Am**	**88**	**(United Arab Emirates) Abu Dhabi-Proton Racing**	**(United Arab Emirates) Khaled Al Qubaisi (United States) Patrick Long (Denmark) David Heinemeier Hansson**	**Porsche 911 RSR**	M	**171**
26	**LMGTE; Am**	**88**	**(United Arab Emirates) Abu Dhabi-Proton Racing**	**(United Arab Emirates) Khaled Al Qubaisi (United States) Patrick Long (Denmark) David Heinemeier Hansson**	**Porsche 4.0 L Flat-6**	M	**171**
27	LMGTE; Am	78	(Hong Kong) KCMG	(Germany) Christian Ried (Germany) Wolf Henzler (Switzerland) Joël Camathias	Porsche 911 RSR	M	170
27	LMGTE; Am	78	(Hong Kong) KCMG	(Germany) Christian Ried (Germany) Wolf Henzler (Switzerland) Joël Camathias	Porsche 4.0 L Flat-6	M	170
28	LMGTE; Am	83	(Italy) AF Corse	(France) François Perrodo (France) Emmanuel Collard (Portugal) Rui Águas	Ferrari 458 Italia GT2	M	169
28	LMGTE; Am	83	(Italy) AF Corse	(France) François Perrodo (France) Emmanuel Collard (Portugal) Rui Águas	Ferrari 4.5 L V8	M	169
29	LMGTE; Am	86	(United Kingdom) Gulf Racing	(United Kingdom) Michael Wainwright (United Kingdom) Adam Carroll (United Kingdom) Ben Barker	Porsche 911 RSR	M	168
29	LMGTE; Am	86	(United Kingdom) Gulf Racing	(United Kingdom) Michael Wainwright (United Kingdom) Adam Carroll (United Kingdom) Ben Barker	Porsche 4.0 L Flat-6	M	168
30	LMGTE; Am	50	(France) Larbre Compétition	(France) Romain Brandela (France) Pierre Ragues (United States) Ricky Taylor	Chevrolet Corvette C7.R	M	164
30	LMGTE; Am	50	(France) Larbre Compétition	(France) Romain Brandela (France) Pierre Ragues (United States) Ricky Taylor	Chevrolet LT5.5 5.5 L V8	M	164
DNF	LMGTE; Am	98	(United Kingdom) Aston Martin Racing	(Canada) Paul Dalla Lana (Portugal) Pedro Lamy (Austria) Mathias Lauda	Aston Martin V8 Vantage GTE	M	84
DNF	LMGTE; Am	98	(United Kingdom) Aston Martin Racing	(Canada) Paul Dalla Lana (Portugal) Pedro Lamy (Austria) Mathias Lauda	Aston Martin 4.5 L V8	M	84

FIA World Endurance Championship
Previous race: 6 Hours of Shanghai	2016 season	Next race: None
