= 2016 6 Hours of Circuit of the Americas =

Endurance sportscar racing event in Austin, Texas

(United States) 2016 6 Hours of Circuit of the Americas
Event information
- Round 6 of 9 in the 2016 FIA World Endurance Championship
- Date: 17 September 2016
- Location: Austin, Texas
- Venue: Circuit of the Americas
- Duration: 6 Hours

Results
- Laps completed: 186
- Distance (km): 1025.418
- Distance (miles): 637.236
- LMP1

Pole position
- Time: 1:45.750
- Team: (Germany) Audi Sport Team Joest

Winners
- Team: (Germany) Porsche Team
- Drivers: (Germany) Timo Bernhard (New Zealand) Brendon Hartley (Australia) Mark Webber
- LMP2

Winners
- Team: (France) Signatech Alpine
- Drivers: (France) Nicolas Lapierre (United States) Gustavo Menezes (Monaco) Stéphane Richelmi
- LMGTE Pro

Winners
- Team: (United Kingdom) Aston Martin Racing
- Drivers: (Denmark) Nicki Thiim (Denmark) Marco Sørensen
- LMGTE Am

Winners
- Team: (United Kingdom) Aston Martin Racing
- Drivers: (Canada) Paul Dalla Lana (Portugal) Pedro Lamy (Austria) Mathias Lauda

The 2016 6 Hours of Circuit of the Americas was an endurance sports car racing event held at the Circuit of the Americas, Austin, USA, on 15–17 September 2016, and served as the sixth round of the 2016 FIA World Endurance Championship season. Porsche's Timo Bernhard, Brendon Hartley and Mark Webber won the race driving the No. 1 Porsche 919 Hybrid car.

== Qualifying ==
=== Qualifying result ===
Pole position in Class is in bold.

Pos	Class	Team	Average Time	Grid
1	**LMP1**	**No. 7 Audi Sport Team Joest**	**1:45.750**	**1**
2	LMP1	No. 8 Audi Sport Team Joest	1:45.983	2
3	LMP1	No. 1 Porsche Team	1:46.560	3
4	LMP1	No. 6 Toyota Gazoo Racing	1:47.218	4
5	LMP1	No. 2 Porsche Team	1:47.331	5
6	LMP1	No. 5 Toyota Gazoo Racing	1:48.584	6
7	LMP1	No. 13 Rebellion Racing	1:53.646	7
8	LMP1	No. 4 ByKolles Racing	1:54.577	8
9	**LMP2**	**No. 36 Signatech Alpine**	**1:55.892**	**9**
10	LMP2	No. 44 Manor	1:56.873	10
11	LMP2	No. 43 RGR Sport by Morand	1:57.367	11
12	LMP2	No. 42 Strakka Racing	1:57.536	12
13	LMP2	No. 35 Baxi DC Racing Alpine	1:58.060	13
14	LMP2	No. 37 SMP Racing	1:58.379	14
15	LMP2	No. 31 Extreme Speed Motorsports	1:58.394	15
16	LMP2	No. 27 SMP Racing	1:58.769	16
17	LMP2	No. 30 Extreme Speed Motorsports	2:00.631	17
18	**LMGTE-Pro**	**No. 95 Aston Martin Racing**	**2:04.610**	**18**
19	LMGTE-Pro	No. 71 AF Corse	2:04.652	19
20	LMGTE-Pro	No. 66 Ford Chip Ganassi Team UK	2:04.804	20
21	LMGTE-Pro	No. 51 AF Corse	2:04.821	21
22	LMGTE-Pro	No. 97 Aston Martin Racing	2:04.889	22
23	LMGTE-Pro	No. 67 Ford Chip Ganassi Team UK	2:05.057	23
24	LMGTE-Pro	No. 77 Dempsey-Proton Racing	2:06.060	24
25	**LMGTE-Am**	**No. 98 Aston Martin Racing**	**2:07.683**	**25**
26	LMGTE-Am	No. 88 Abu Dhabi-Proton Racing	2:08.295	26
27	LMGTE-Am	No. 78 KCMG	2:08.816	27
28	LMGTE-Am	No. 86 Gulf Racing	2:09.119	28
29	LMGTE-Am	No. 83 AF Corse	2:09.187	29
30	LMGTE-Am	No. 50 Larbre Compétition	2:09.190	30
31	LMP2	No. 26 G-Drive Racing	1:57.860^{1}	31

^1 – Only one driver of the No. 26 G-Drive Racing set a lap time.

== Race ==
=== Race result ===
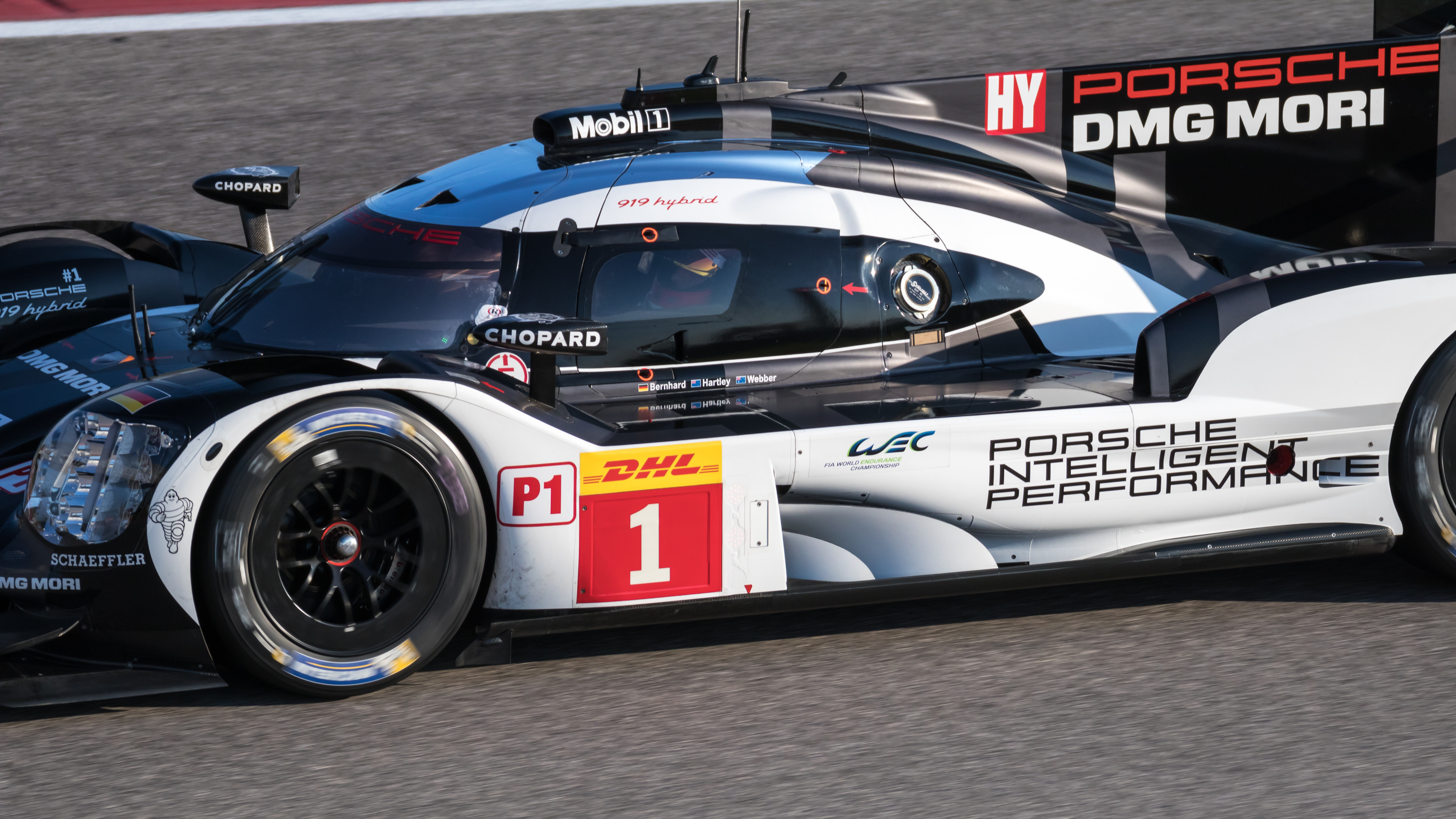
The LMP1 race-winning No. 1 car

Class winners are denoted with bold.

Pos	Class	No	Team	Drivers	Chassis	Tyre	Laps
Pos	Class	No	Team	Drivers	Engine	Tyre	Laps
1	LMP1	1	(Germany) Porsche Team	(Germany) Timo Bernhard (New Zealand) Brendon Hartley (Australia) Mark Webber	Porsche 919 Hybrid	M	186
1	LMP1	1	(Germany) Porsche Team	(Germany) Timo Bernhard (New Zealand) Brendon Hartley (Australia) Mark Webber	Porsche 2.0 L Turbo V4	M	186
2	LMP1	8	(Germany) Audi Sport Team Joest	(France) Loïc Duval (Brazil) Lucas di Grassi (United Kingdom) Oliver Jarvis	Audi R18	M	186
2	LMP1	8	(Germany) Audi Sport Team Joest	(France) Loïc Duval (Brazil) Lucas di Grassi (United Kingdom) Oliver Jarvis	Audi TDI 4.0 L Turbo Diesel V6	M	186
3	LMP1	6	(Japan) Toyota Gazoo Racing	(France) Stéphane Sarrazin (United Kingdom) Mike Conway (Japan) Kamui Kobayashi	Toyota TS050 Hybrid	M	186
3	LMP1	6	(Japan) Toyota Gazoo Racing	(France) Stéphane Sarrazin (United Kingdom) Mike Conway (Japan) Kamui Kobayashi	Toyota 2.4 L Turbo V6	M	186
4	LMP1	2	(Germany) Porsche Team	(Germany) Marc Lieb (France) Romain Dumas (Switzerland) Neel Jani	Porsche 919 Hybrid	M	185
4	LMP1	2	(Germany) Porsche Team	(Germany) Marc Lieb (France) Romain Dumas (Switzerland) Neel Jani	Porsche 2.0 L Turbo V4	M	185
5	LMP1	5	(Japan) Toyota Gazoo Racing	(Switzerland) Sébastien Buemi (Japan) Kazuki Nakajima (United Kingdom) Anthony Davidson	Toyota TS050 Hybrid	M	184
5	LMP1	5	(Japan) Toyota Gazoo Racing	(Switzerland) Sébastien Buemi (Japan) Kazuki Nakajima (United Kingdom) Anthony Davidson	Toyota 2.4 L Turbo V6	M	184
6	LMP1	7	(Germany) Audi Sport Team Joest	(Germany) André Lotterer (Switzerland) Marcel Fässler (France) Benoît Tréluyer	Audi R18	M	180
6	LMP1	7	(Germany) Audi Sport Team Joest	(Germany) André Lotterer (Switzerland) Marcel Fässler (France) Benoît Tréluyer	Audi TDI 4.0 L Turbo Diesel V6	M	180
7	LMP1	13	(Switzerland) Rebellion Racing	(Austria) Dominik Kraihamer (Switzerland) Alexandre Imperatori (Switzerland) Mathéo Tuscher	Rebellion R-One	D	174
7	LMP1	13	(Switzerland) Rebellion Racing	(Austria) Dominik Kraihamer (Switzerland) Alexandre Imperatori (Switzerland) Mathéo Tuscher	AER P60 2.4 L Turbo V6	D	174
8	LMP2	36	(France) Signatech Alpine	(France) Nicolas Lapierre (United States) Gustavo Menezes (Monaco) Stéphane Richelmi	Alpine A460	D	172
8	LMP2	36	(France) Signatech Alpine	(France) Nicolas Lapierre (United States) Gustavo Menezes (Monaco) Stéphane Richelmi	Nissan VK45DE 4.5 L V8	D	172
9	LMP2	43	(Mexico) RGR Sport by Morand	(Mexico) Ricardo González (Portugal) Filipe Albuquerque (Brazil) Bruno Senna	Ligier JS P2	D	171
9	LMP2	43	(Mexico) RGR Sport by Morand	(Mexico) Ricardo González (Portugal) Filipe Albuquerque (Brazil) Bruno Senna	Nissan VK45DE 4.5 L V8	D	171
10	LMP2	26	(Russia) G-Drive Racing	(Russia) Roman Rusinov (United Kingdom) Alex Brundle (Germany) René Rast	Oreca 05	D	171
10	LMP2	26	(Russia) G-Drive Racing	(Russia) Roman Rusinov (United Kingdom) Alex Brundle (Germany) René Rast	Nissan VK45DE 4.5 L V8	D	171
11	LMP1	4	(Austria) ByKolles Racing Team	(Switzerland) Simon Trummer (United Kingdom) Oliver Webb	CLM P1/01	D	170
11	LMP1	4	(Austria) ByKolles Racing Team	(Switzerland) Simon Trummer (United Kingdom) Oliver Webb	AER P60 2.4 L Turbo V6	D	170
12	LMP2	27	(Russia) SMP Racing	(France) Nicolas Minassian (Italy) Maurizio Mediani	BR Engineering BR01	D	168
12	LMP2	27	(Russia) SMP Racing	(France) Nicolas Minassian (Italy) Maurizio Mediani	Nissan VK45DE 4.5 L V8	D	168
13	LMP2	31	(United States) Extreme Speed Motorsports	(United Kingdom) Ryan Dalziel (Canada) Chris Cumming (Brazil) Pipo Derani	Ligier JS P2	M	168
13	LMP2	31	(United States) Extreme Speed Motorsports	(United Kingdom) Ryan Dalziel (Canada) Chris Cumming (Brazil) Pipo Derani	Nissan VK45DE 4.5 L V8	M	168
14	LMP2	37	(Russia) SMP Racing	(Russia) Vitaly Petrov (Russia) Viktor Shaytar (Russia) Kirill Ladygin	BR Engineering BR01	D	167
14	LMP2	37	(Russia) SMP Racing	(Russia) Vitaly Petrov (Russia) Viktor Shaytar (Russia) Kirill Ladygin	Nissan VK45DE 4.5 L V8	D	167
15	LMP2	30	(United States) Extreme Speed Motorsports	(United States) Scott Sharp (United States) Ed Brown (United States) Johannes van Overbeek	Ligier JS P2	M	166
15	LMP2	30	(United States) Extreme Speed Motorsports	(United States) Scott Sharp (United States) Ed Brown (United States) Johannes van Overbeek	Nissan VK45DE 4.5 L V8	M	166
16	LMGTE; Pro	95	(United Kingdom) Aston Martin Racing	(Denmark) Nicki Thiim (Denmark) Marco Sørensen	Aston Martin V8 Vantage GTE	D	163
16	LMGTE; Pro	95	(United Kingdom) Aston Martin Racing	(Denmark) Nicki Thiim (Denmark) Marco Sørensen	Aston Martin 4.5 L V8	D	163
17	LMGTE; Pro	51	(Italy) AF Corse	(Italy) Gianmaria Bruni (United Kingdom) James Calado	Ferrari 488 GTE	M	163
17	LMGTE; Pro	51	(Italy) AF Corse	(Italy) Gianmaria Bruni (United Kingdom) James Calado	Ferrari F154CB 3.9 L Turbo V8	M	163
18	LMGTE; Pro	71	(Italy) AF Corse	(Italy) Davide Rigon (United Kingdom) Sam Bird	Ferrari 488 GTE	M	162
18	LMGTE; Pro	71	(Italy) AF Corse	(Italy) Davide Rigon (United Kingdom) Sam Bird	Ferrari F154CB 3.9 L Turbo V8	M	162
19	LMGTE; Pro	67	(United States) Ford Chip Ganassi Team UK	(United Kingdom) Andy Priaulx (United Kingdom) Marino Franchitti (United Kingdom) Harry Tincknell	Ford GT	M	162
19	LMGTE; Pro	67	(United States) Ford Chip Ganassi Team UK	(United Kingdom) Andy Priaulx (United Kingdom) Marino Franchitti (United Kingdom) Harry Tincknell	Ford EcoBoost 3.5 L Turbo V6	M	162
20	LMGTE; Pro	97	(United Kingdom) Aston Martin Racing	(United Kingdom) Darren Turner (Brazil) Fernando Rees	Aston Martin V8 Vantage GTE	D	162
20	LMGTE; Pro	97	(United Kingdom) Aston Martin Racing	(United Kingdom) Darren Turner (Brazil) Fernando Rees	Aston Martin 4.5 L V8	D	162
21	LMGTE; Pro	77	(Germany) Dempsey-Proton Racing	(Austria) Richard Lietz (Denmark) Michael Christensen	Porsche 911 RSR	M	161
21	LMGTE; Pro	77	(Germany) Dempsey-Proton Racing	(Austria) Richard Lietz (Denmark) Michael Christensen	Porsche 4.0 L Flat-6	M	161
22	LMGTE; Am	98	(United Kingdom) Aston Martin Racing	(Canada) Paul Dalla Lana (Portugal) Pedro Lamy (Austria) Mathias Lauda	Aston Martin V8 Vantage GTE	M	158
22	LMGTE; Am	98	(United Kingdom) Aston Martin Racing	(Canada) Paul Dalla Lana (Portugal) Pedro Lamy (Austria) Mathias Lauda	Aston Martin 4.5 L V8	M	158
23	LMGTE; Am	78	(Hong Kong) KCMG	(Germany) Christian Ried (Germany) Wolf Henzler (Switzerland) Joël Camathias	Porsche 911 RSR	M	158
23	LMGTE; Am	78	(Hong Kong) KCMG	(Germany) Christian Ried (Germany) Wolf Henzler (Switzerland) Joël Camathias	Porsche 4.0 L Flat-6	M	158
24	LMGTE; Am	50	(France) Larbre Compétition	(United Kingdom) Lars Viljoen (France) Pierre Ragues (United States) Ricky Taylor	Chevrolet Corvette C7.R	M	157
24	LMGTE; Am	50	(France) Larbre Compétition	(United Kingdom) Lars Viljoen (France) Pierre Ragues (United States) Ricky Taylor	Chevrolet LT5.5 5.5 L V8	M	157
25	LMGTE; Am	86	(United Kingdom) Gulf Racing	(United Kingdom) Michael Wainwright (United Kingdom) Adam Carroll (United Kingdom) Ben Barker	Porsche 911 RSR	M	153
25	LMGTE; Am	86	(United Kingdom) Gulf Racing	(United Kingdom) Michael Wainwright (United Kingdom) Adam Carroll (United Kingdom) Ben Barker	Porsche 4.0 L Flat-6	M	153
26	LMP2	35	(China) Baxi DC Racing Alpine	(United States) David Cheng (China) Ho-Pin Tung (France) Nelson Panciatici	Alpine A460	D	153 (Note: The No. 35 DC Racing Alpine-Nissan was penalized by the stewards after the race for failing to achieve the minimum driver time for Nelson Panciatici. Seven laps plus 38.948 seconds was added to race time for DC Racing to account for the amount of time Panciatici was short of his requirement.)
26	LMP2	35	(China) Baxi DC Racing Alpine	(United States) David Cheng (China) Ho-Pin Tung (France) Nelson Panciatici	Nissan VK45DE 4.5 L V8	D	153
27	LMGTE; Am	88	(United Arab Emirates) Abu Dhabi-Proton Racing	(United Arab Emirates) Khaled Al Qubaisi (France) Kévin Estre (Denmark) David Heinemeier Hansson	Porsche 911 RSR	M	153
27	LMGTE; Am	88	(United Arab Emirates) Abu Dhabi-Proton Racing	(United Arab Emirates) Khaled Al Qubaisi (France) Kévin Estre (Denmark) David Heinemeier Hansson	Porsche 4.0 L Flat-6	M	153
28	LMGTE; Am	83	(Italy) AF Corse	(France) François Perrodo (France) Emmanuel Collard (Portugal) Rui Águas	Ferrari 458 Italia GT2	M	147
28	LMGTE; Am	83	(Italy) AF Corse	(France) François Perrodo (France) Emmanuel Collard (Portugal) Rui Águas	Ferrari 4.5 L V8	M	147
29	LMGTE; Pro	66	(United States) Ford Chip Ganassi Team UK	(France) Olivier Pla (Germany) Stefan Mücke	Ford GT	M	144
29	LMGTE; Pro	66	(United States) Ford Chip Ganassi Team UK	(France) Olivier Pla (Germany) Stefan Mücke	Ford EcoBoost 3.5 L Turbo V6	M	144
DNF	LMP2	44	(United Kingdom) Manor	(United Kingdom) Matt Rao (United Kingdom) Richard Bradley (Spain) Roberto Merhi	Oreca 05	D	157
DNF	LMP2	44	(United Kingdom) Manor	(United Kingdom) Matt Rao (United Kingdom) Richard Bradley (Spain) Roberto Merhi	Nissan VK45DE 4.5 L V8	D	157
DNF	LMP2	42	(United Kingdom) Strakka Racing	(United Kingdom) Nick Leventis (United Kingdom) Jonny Kane (United Kingdom) Lewis Williamson	Gibson 015S	D	58
DNF	LMP2	42	(United Kingdom) Strakka Racing	(United Kingdom) Nick Leventis (United Kingdom) Jonny Kane (United Kingdom) Lewis Williamson	Nissan VK45DE 4.5 L V8	D	58

=== Notes ===
FIA World Endurance Championship
Previous race: 6 Hours of Mexico	2016 season	Next race: 6 Hours of Fuji
