= Rebellion R-One =

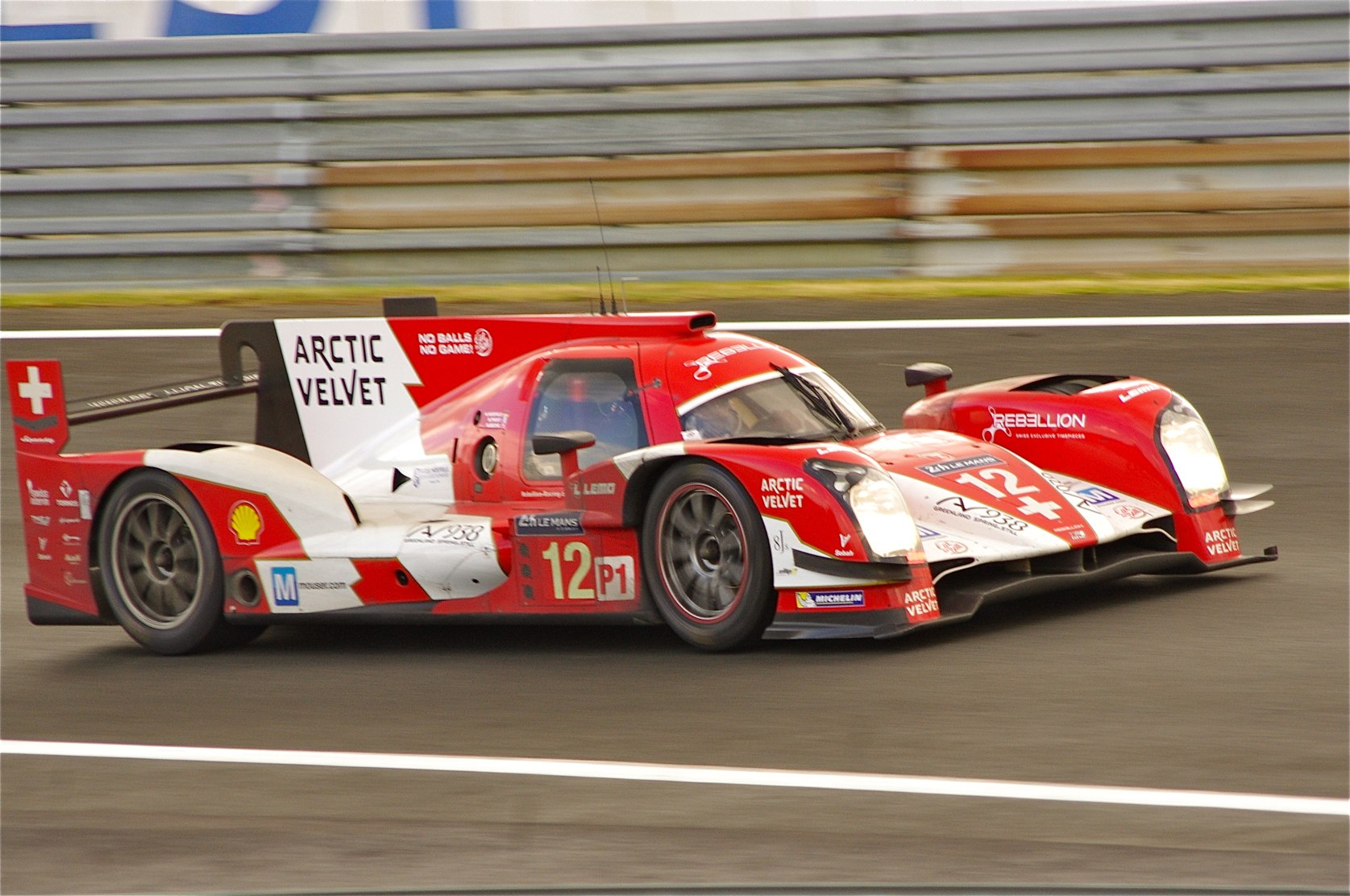
- The No. 12 R-One at the 2014 24 Hours of Le Mans
- Category: Le Mans Prototype (LMP1)
- Constructor: Rebellion (Oreca)
- Designer: Christophe Guibbal
- Predecessor: Lola B12/60
- Successor: Rebellion R13

Technical specifications
- Chassis: Carbon fibre composite monocoque
- Suspension (front): Double wishbone, push rod operated over damper
- Suspension (rear): Double wishbone, push rod operated over damper
- Wheelbase: 13 in × 18 in (330.2 mm × 457.2 mm)
- Engine: AER P60 2.4 litre V6 Twin Turbocharged mid-engined, longitudinally mounted Toyota RV8KLM 3.4 L V8
- Transmission: Xtrac P1159C 7-speed sequential manual X-Trac Viscous mechanical locking differential
- Power: 2014 Spec: 391 kW (524 hp; 532 PS) 2015-2016 Spec: 373 kW (500 hp; 507 PS)
- Weight: 850kg (2014 Spec); 835kg (2015-2016 Spec)
- Fuel: Shell
- Tyres: Michelin; Dunlop

Competition history
- Notable entrants: (Switzerland) Rebellion Racing
- Notable drivers: (France) Nicolas Prost, (Germany) Nick Heidfeld, (Germany) Daniel Abt, (Switzerland) Mathias Beche, (Austria) Dominik Kraihamer, (Italy) Andrea Belicchi, (Switzerland) Fabio Leimer, (Switzerland) Alexandre Imperatori (Brazil) Nelson Piquet Jr. (Switzerland) Mathéo Tuscher
- Debut: 2014 6 Hours of Spa-Francorchamps
- First win: 2014 6 Hours of Silverstone
- Last win: 2016 6 Hours of Bahrain
- Last event: 2016 6 Hours of Bahrain
| Races | Wins | Poles | F/Laps |
|---|---|---|---|
| 22 | 8 | 8 | 8 |
- Teams' Championships: 3 (2014, 2015, 2016 FIA Endurance Trophy Private LMP1 Teams)
- Drivers' Championships: 3 (2014 FIA LMP1 Private Teams Drivers Trophy, 2015 FIA LMP1 Private Teams Drivers Trophy, 2016 FIA Endurance Trophy LMP1 Private Team Drivers)

The Rebellion R-One is a sports prototype racing car built by French constructor Oreca on behalf of Swiss-based team Rebellion Racing. It is designed to meet the 2014 LMP1-L regulations for Le Mans Prototypes in the FIA World Endurance Championship as well as at the 24 Hours of Le Mans, and replaces the Lola B12/60 chassis. The first two R-Ones debuted at the 2014 6 Hours of Spa-Francorchamps, round two of the FIA World Endurance Championship. The Rebellion R-One shares the same monocoque as the Oreca 05, and the Oreca 07.

== Development ==
Since forming in 2008 as a partnership between Speedy Racing Team and Sebah Automotive, Rebellion Racing have been using chassis from Lola Cars in the LMP2 class before switching to LMP1 in 2009. In 2011, Rebellion announced a partnership with Toyota Motorsport GmbH confirming an engine supply partnership.

Since Lola became defunct at the end of 2012, parts for Rebellion's existing B12/80's became increasingly difficult to obtain. Rebellion managed to negotiate a deal with French constructor Oreca towards the end of 2013 for a LMP1-spec car for the 2014 season. The car was designed "in record time" according to Oreca Technical Director David Floury. The car only began testing in April 2014 and was not ready for the first race of the FIA WEC season, the 6 Hours of Silverstone, therefore Rebellion had to race with the two existing Lola B12/80s for the Silverstone race before switching to the R-Ones for round 2 at Spa-Francorchamps.

== Racing history ==
=== 2014 season ===
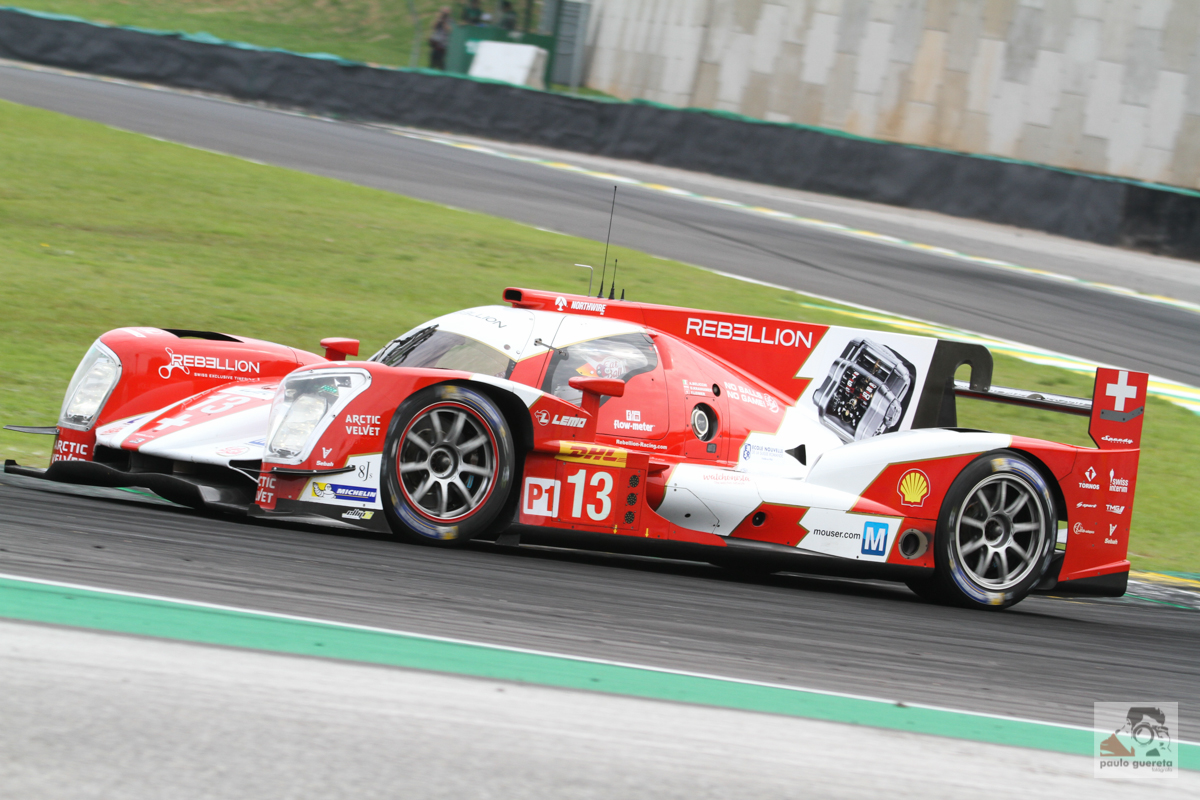
The No. 13 at the 2014 6 Hours of São Paulo

The 2014 6 Hours of Spa-Francorchamps was the public début of the Rebellion R-One. Both cars were struggling with teething issues that usually accompany brand new cars. The two cars were the only entrants in the privateer LMP1-L class so they were guaranteed to win the class, regardless if it was the No. 12 or 13 car. It was car number 12 that looked most likely after qualifying, where it started 12th on the grid while car 13 failed to set a time and started at the back of the grid. Car number 12 driven by Nicolas Prost, Nick Heidfeld and Mathias Beche climbed five positions and finished seventh overall, ten laps down on the overall winning Toyota hybrid. The No. 13 car was the only retirement of the race, bowing out due to electrical problems after completing 47 laps.

| Year | Entrant | Class | Drivers | No. | Rounds | | | | | | | | Points | WEP pos. |
| Year | Entrant | Class | Drivers | No. | 1 | 2 | 3 | 4 | 5 | 6 | 7 | 8 | Points | WEP pos. |
|---|---|---|---|---|---|---|---|---|---|---|---|---|---|---|
| 2014 | (Switzerland) Rebellion Racing | LMP1-L | (France) Nicolas Prost (Germany) Nick Heidfeld (Switzerland) Mathias Beche | 12 | SIL*; 1 | SPA; 1 | LMN; 1 | COA; 1 | FUJ; 2 | SHA; 1 | BHR; 2 | SÃO; 2 | 204 | 1st |
| 2014 | (Switzerland) Rebellion Racing | LMP1-L | (Italy) Andrea Belicchi (Austria) Dominik Kraihamer (Switzerland) Fabio Leimer | 13 | SIL*; DNF | SPA; DNF | LMN; DNF | COA; DNF | FUJ; 1 | SHA; 2 | BHR; 1 | SÃO; 1 | 93 | 2nd |

Note* Rebellion Racing used Lola B12/60's during the 2014 6 Hours of Silverstone

=== 2015 season ===
The car underwent an engine change for the 2015 season, changing to an Advanced Engine Research 2.4L twin-turbo V6. This necessitated extensive revisions to the chassis and as a result the team missed the first two races of the season in order to modify and test the cars. Due to the new AER P60 engine, the car featured a new cooling layout with dual heat exchangers on both sides of the car, a revised transmission, and most noticeably, a distinctive split airbox, located further back on the engine cover compared to that used on the Rebellion-Toyota. The split necessary, due to the airbox being located so far back on the car, that the mandatory fin had to pass through its centre The revised car was tested for the first time at Paul Ricard in France at the end of May and was expected to take part in the Le Mans 24 Hours.

| Year | Entrant | Class | Drivers | No. | Rounds | | | | | | | | Points | WEP pos. |
| Year | Entrant | Class | Drivers | No. | 1 | 2 | 3 | 4 | 5 | 6 | 7 | 8 | Points | WEP pos. |
|---|---|---|---|---|---|---|---|---|---|---|---|---|---|---|
| 2015 | (Switzerland) Rebellion Racing | LMP1 | (France) Nicolas Prost (Germany) Nick Heidfeld (Switzerland) Mathias Beche | 12 | SIL | SPA | LMN; 2 | NÜR; 2 | COA; 3 | FUJ; 1 | SHA; 1 | BHR; 3 | 134 | 1st |
| 2015 | (Switzerland) Rebellion Racing | LMP1 | (Switzerland) Alexandre Imperatori (Austria) Dominik Kraihamer (Germany) Daniel Abt | 13 | SIL | SPA | LMN; 1 | NÜR; DNF | COA; 2 | FUJ; 3 | SHA; DNF | BHR; 1 | 108 | 2nd |

=== 2016 season ===
The Rebellion teams cars retained using Advanced Engine Research 2.4L twin-turbo V6 engines while also switching from Michelin to Dunlop Tyres. Their drivers would be Nick Heidfeld, Nicolas Prost and Nelson Piquet Jr. with Mathias Beche appearing only in round 4 in the #12 entry car. Dominik Kraihamer, Alexandre Imperatori and Mathéo Tuscher would be the driver line-up in the #13 car. From the 2016 6 Hours of Mexico round and onward for the rest of the season the team would only run one car (The #13 Entry).

| Year | Entrant | Class | Drivers | No. | Rounds | | | | | | | | | Points | WEP pos. |
| Year | Entrant | Class | Drivers | No. | 1 | 2 | 3 | 4 | 5 | 6 | 7 | 8 | 9 | Points | WEP pos. |
|---|---|---|---|---|---|---|---|---|---|---|---|---|---|---|---|
| 2016 | (Switzerland) Rebellion Racing | LMP1 | (Germany) Nick Heidfeld (France) Nicolas Prost (Brazil) Nelson Piquet Jr. (Switzerland) Mathias Beche | 12 | SIL; 2 | SPA; 2 | LMN; 1 | NÜR; 2 | MEX | COA | FUJ | SHA | BHR | 104 | 3rd |
| 2016 | (Switzerland) Rebellion Racing | LMP1 | (Austria) Dominik Kraihamer (Switzerland) Alexandre Imperatori (Switzerland) Mathéo Tuscher | 13 | SIL; 1 | SPA; 1 | LMN; DNF | NÜR; 1 | MEX; 1 | COA; 1 | FUJ; 1 | SHA; 2 | BHR; 1 | 193 | 1st |

== See also ==
- CLM P1/01
- Oreca 05
