= Dominik Kraihamer =

Austrian racing driver

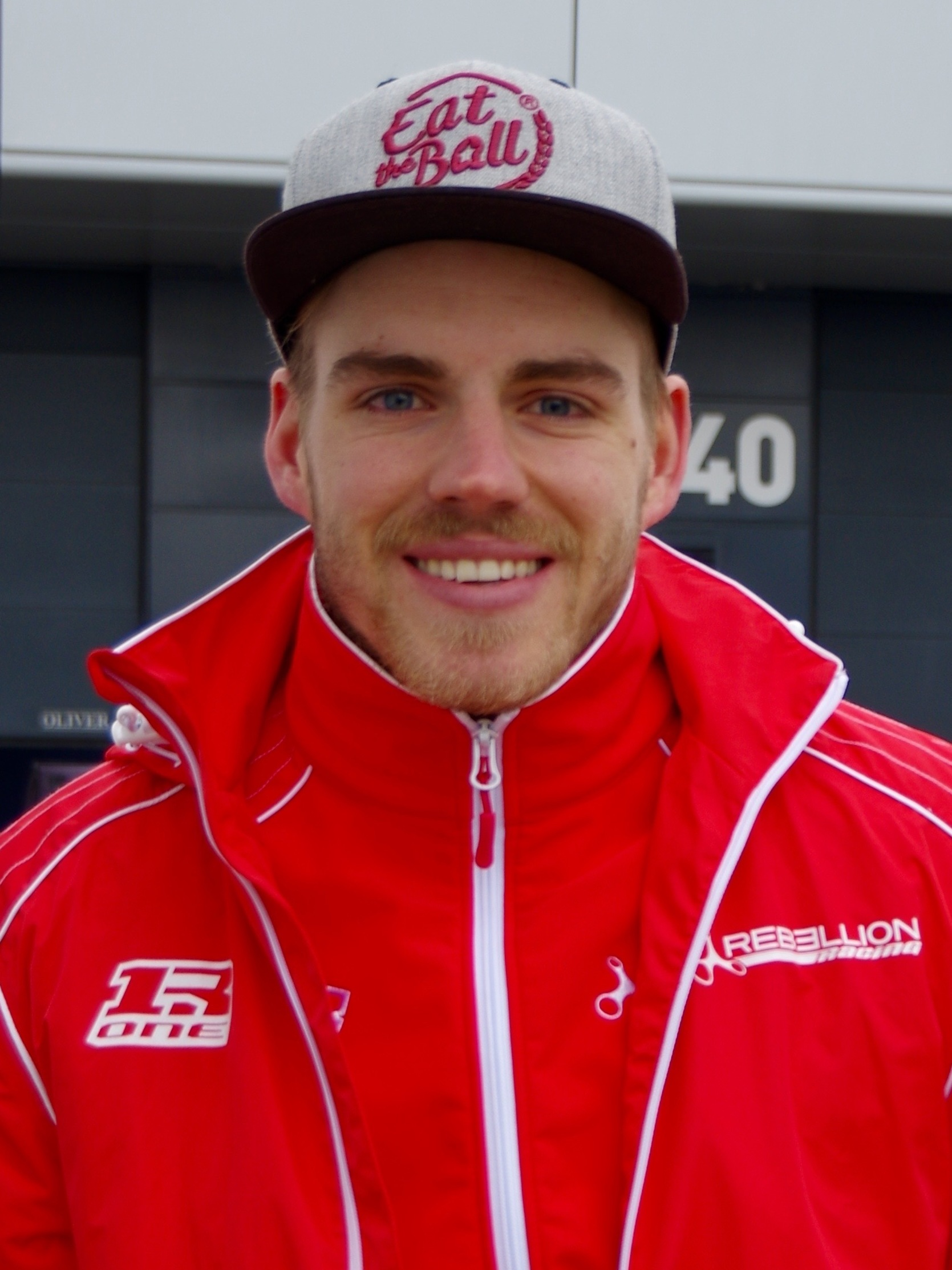
- Kraihamer at the 2016 6 Hours of Silverstone
- Nationality: (Austria) Austrian
- Born: 29 November 1989 (age 36) Oberndorf, Austria

FIA World Endurance Championship career
- Current team: ByKolles Racing Team
- Categorisation: FIA Gold
- Car number: 4

Previous series
- 2011 2009–10 2008: Le Mans Series; Formula Le Mans; FIA GT3 European Championship
24 Hours of Le Mans career
- Years: 2011-
- Best finish: 18th (2015)
- Class wins: N/A

Dominik Kraihamer (born 29 November 1989 in Oberndorf) is an Austrian racing driver. He most recently competed in the 2018–19 season of the FIA World Endurance Championship for ByKolles Racing Team.

== Career ==
Kraihamer's racing career began in 2004 in karting, where he found success in the Rotax Max Challenge in his native country, Austria. In 2008, he was runner-up in the Rotax Max Euro Challenge DD2, and fourth in the grand finals. 2008 also saw the start of his car racing career, contesting the FIA GT3 European Championship in a Lamborghini Gallardo for S-Berg Racing.

In 2009, Kraihamer competed in Formula Le Mans, finishing 13th for Boutsen Energy Racing. The following year he improved to finish fifth in the standings. For 2011, he stepped up to LMP2 with the Boutsen team, finishing fifth in the Le Mans Series. He also made his 24 Hours of Le Mans debut driving an LMP2 Oreca.

In 2012, Kraihamer raced in the LMP1 category of the FIA World Endurance Championship, driving for OAK Racing.

== Racing record ==
=== 24 Hours of Le Mans results ===
Year	Team	Co-Drivers	Car	Class	Laps	Pos.	Class Pos.
2011	(France) Team Oreca-Matmut	(France) Alexandre Prémat (France) David Hallyday	Oreca 03-Nissan	LMP2	200	DNF	DNF
2012	(France) OAK Racing	(France) Franck Montagny (Belgium) Bertrand Baguette	OAK Pescarolo 01 Evo-Judd	LMP1	219	DNF	DNF
2013	(Czech Republic) Lotus	(Germany) Thomas Holzer (Czech Republic) Jan Charouz	Lotus T128-Praga	LMP2	219	DNF	DNF
2014	(Switzerland) Rebellion Racing	(Italy) Andrea Belicchi (Switzerland) Fabio Leimer	Rebellion R-One-Toyota	LMP1-L	73	DNF	DNF
2015	(Switzerland) Rebellion Racing	(Switzerland) Alexandre Imperatori (Germany) Daniel Abt	Rebellion R-One-AER	LMP1	336	18th	9th
2016	(Switzerland) Rebellion Racing	(Switzerland) Alexandre Imperatori (Switzerland) Mathéo Tuscher	Rebellion R-One-AER	LMP1	200	DNF	DNF
2017	(Austria) ByKolles Racing Team	(United Kingdom) Oliver Webb (Italy) Marco Bonanomi	ENSO CLM P1/01-Nismo	LMP1	7	DNF	DNF
2018	(Austria) ByKolles Racing Team	(United Kingdom) Oliver Webb (France) Tom Dillmann	ENSO CLM P1/01-Nismo	LMP1	65	DNF	DNF

=== Complete FIA World Endurance Championship results ===
Year	Entrant	Class	Chassis	Engine	1	2	3	4	5	6	7	8	9	Rank	Pts
2012	OAK Racing	LMP1	OAK Pescarolo 01	Judd DB 3.4 L V8	SEB; 25	SPA; Ret	LMS; Ret							71st	2
2012	OAK Racing	LMP2	Morgan LMP2	Nissan VK45DE 4.5 L V8				SIL; 14	SÃO; Ret	BHR; Ret				71st	2
2012	OAK Racing	LMP1	OAK Pescarolo 01	Honda LM-V8 3.4 L V8							FUJ; 16	SHA; 14		71st	2
2013	Lotus	LMP2	Lotus T128	Praga (Judd) 3.6 L V8	SIL; NC	SPA; 6	LMS; Ret	SÃO; Ret	COA; 3	FUJ; 6	SHA; 7	BHR; Ret		9th	37
2014	Rebellion Racing	LMP1	Lola B12/60	Toyota RV8KLM 3.4 L V8	SIL; Ret	SPA; Ret	LMS; Ret	COA; Ret	FUJ; 10	SHA; 8	BHR; 6	SÃO; 7		17th	19
2015	Rebellion Racing	LMP1	Rebellion R-One	AER P60 2.4 L Turbo V6	SIL	SPA	LMS; 17	NÜR; Ret	COA; 14	FUJ; 16	SHA; Ret	BHR; 11		25th	2.5
2016	Rebellion Racing	LMP1	Rebellion R-One	AER P60 2.4 L Turbo V6	SIL; 3	SPA; 3	LMS; Ret	NÜR; 7	MEX; 5	COA; 7	FUJ; 6	SHA; 17	BHR; 7	7th	66.5
2017	ByKolles Racing Team	LMP1	ENSO CLM P1/01	Nismo VRX30A 3.0 L Turbo V6	SIL; Ret	SPA; 6	LMS; Ret	NÜR; 14	MEX	COA	FUJ	SHA	BHR	30th	8.5
2018–19	ByKolles Racing Team	LMP1	ENSO CLM P1/01	Nismo VRX30A 3.0 L Turbo V6	SPA; 4	LMS; Ret	SIL	FUJ	SHA	SEB	SPA	LMS		22nd	12
