= 2016 6 Hours of Shanghai =

Sports car endurance race in Shanghai, China

Shanghai International Circuit Track map

The 2016 6 Hours of Shanghai was an endurance sports car racing event held at the Shanghai International Circuit, Shanghai, China on 4—6 November 2016, and served as the eighth race of the 2016 FIA World Endurance Championship. Porsche's Timo Bernhard, Brendon Hartley and Mark Webber won the race driving the No. 1 Porsche 919 Hybrid car.

== Qualifying ==
=== Qualifying result ===
Pole position in Class is in bold.

Pos	Class	Team	Average Time	Grid
1	**LMP1**	**No. 1 Porsche Team**	**1:44.462**	**1**
2	LMP1	No. 5 Toyota Gazoo Racing	1:44.522	2
3	LMP1	No. 8 Audi Sport Team Joest	1:44.610	3
4	LMP1	No. 6 Toyota Gazoo Racing	1:44.810	4
5	LMP1	No. 7 Audi Sport Team Joest	1:44.868	5
6	LMP1	No. 2 Porsche Team	1:45.051	6
7	LMP1	No. 13 Rebellion Racing	1:49.828	7
8	LMP1	No. 4 ByKolles Racing	1:51.285	8
9	**LMP2**	**No. 44 Manor**	**1:54.225**	**9**
10	LMP2	No. 36 Signatech Alpine	1:54.382	10
11	LMP2	No. 30 Extreme Speed Motorsports	1:54.398	11
12	LMP2	No. 26 G-Drive Racing	1:54.759	12
13	LMP2	No. 43 RGR Sport by Morand	1:54.845	13
14	LMP2	No. 45 Manor	1:54.899	14
15	LMP2	No. 27 SMP Racing	1:55.754	15
16	LMP2	No. 37 SMP Racing	1:56.429	16
17	LMP2	No. 31 Extreme Speed Motorsports	1:56.439	17
18	LMP2	No. 35 Baxi DC Racing Alpine	1:57.111	18
19	**LMGTE-Pro**	**No. 67 Ford Chip Ganassi Team UK**	**2:01.391**	**19**
20	LMGTE-Pro	No. 66 Ford Chip Ganassi Team UK	2:01.528	20
21	LMGTE-Pro	No. 95 Aston Martin Racing	2:02.040	21
22	LMGTE-Pro	No. 51 AF Corse	2:02.315	22
23	LMGTE-Pro	No. 97 Aston Martin Racing	2:02.432	23
24	LMGTE-Pro	No. 71 AF Corse	2:02.866	24
25	LMGTE-Pro	No. 77 Dempsey-Proton Racing	2:03.767	25
26	**LMGTE-Am**	**No. 98 Aston Martin Racing**	**2:04.997**	**26**
27	LMGTE-Am	No. 83 AF Corse	2:05.334	27
28	LMGTE-Am	No. 88 Abu Dhabi-Proton Racing	2:05.466	28
29	LMGTE-Am	No. 78 KCMG	2:06.344	29
30	LMGTE-Am	No. 86 Gulf Racing	2:07.712	30
31	LMGTE-Am	No. 50 Larbre Compétition	2:07.857	31

== Race ==
=== Race result ===
Class winners are denoted with bold.

Pos	Class	No	Team	Drivers	Chassis	Tyre	Laps
Pos	Class	No	Team	Drivers	Engine	Tyre	Laps
1	LMP1	1	(Germany) Porsche Team	(Germany) Timo Bernhard (Australia) Mark Webber (New Zealand) Brendon Hartley	Porsche 919 Hybrid	MI	195
1	LMP1	1	(Germany) Porsche Team	(Germany) Timo Bernhard (Australia) Mark Webber (New Zealand) Brendon Hartley	Porsche 2.0 L Turbo V4	MI	195
2	LMP1	6	(Japan) Toyota Gazoo Racing	(France) Stéphane Sarrazin (United Kingdom) Mike Conway (Japan) Kamui Kobayashi	Toyota TS050 Hybrid	MI	195
2	LMP1	6	(Japan) Toyota Gazoo Racing	(France) Stéphane Sarrazin (United Kingdom) Mike Conway (Japan) Kamui Kobayashi	Toyota 2.4 L Turbo V6	MI	195
3	LMP1	5	(Japan) Toyota Gazoo Racing	(United Kingdom) Anthony Davidson (Switzerland) Sébastien Buemi (Japan) Kazuki Nakajima	Toyota TS050 Hybrid	MI	195
3	LMP1	5	(Japan) Toyota Gazoo Racing	(United Kingdom) Anthony Davidson (Switzerland) Sébastien Buemi (Japan) Kazuki Nakajima	Toyota 2.4 L Turbo V6	MI	195
4	LMP1	2	(Germany) Porsche Team	(France) Romain Dumas (Switzerland) Neel Jani (Germany) Marc Lieb	Porsche 919 Hybrid	MI	195
4	LMP1	2	(Germany) Porsche Team	(France) Romain Dumas (Switzerland) Neel Jani (Germany) Marc Lieb	Porsche 2.0 L Turbo V4	MI	195
5	LMP1	8	(Germany) Audi Sport Team Joest	(Brazil) Lucas di Grassi (France) Loïc Duval (United Kingdom) Oliver Jarvis	Audi R18	MI	192
5	LMP1	8	(Germany) Audi Sport Team Joest	(Brazil) Lucas di Grassi (France) Loïc Duval (United Kingdom) Oliver Jarvis	Audi TDI 4.0 L Turbo Diesel V6	MI	192
6	LMP1	7	(Germany) Audi Sport Team Joest	(Switzerland) Marcel Fässler (Germany) André Lotterer (France) Benoît Tréluyer	Audi R18	MI	181
6	LMP1	7	(Germany) Audi Sport Team Joest	(Switzerland) Marcel Fässler (Germany) André Lotterer (France) Benoît Tréluyer	Audi TDI 4.0 L Turbo Diesel V6	MI	181
7	LMP1	4	(Austria) ByKolles Racing Team	(Switzerland) Simon Trummer (United Kingdom) Oliver Webb (Germany) Pierre Kaffer	CLM P1/01	D	181
7	LMP1	4	(Austria) ByKolles Racing Team	(Switzerland) Simon Trummer (United Kingdom) Oliver Webb (Germany) Pierre Kaffer	AER P60 2.4 L Turbo V6	D	181
8	LMP2	26	(Russia) G-Drive Racing	(Russia) Roman Rusinov (United Kingdom) Alex Brundle (United Kingdom) Will Stevens	Oreca 05	D	180
8	LMP2	26	(Russia) G-Drive Racing	(Russia) Roman Rusinov (United Kingdom) Alex Brundle (United Kingdom) Will Stevens	Nissan VK45DE 4.5 L V8	D	180
9	LMP2	30	(United States) Extreme Speed Motorsports	(Italy) Antonio Giovinazzi (United Kingdom) Tom Blomqvist (Indonesia) Sean Gelael	Ligier JS P2	MI	179
9	LMP2	30	(United States) Extreme Speed Motorsports	(Italy) Antonio Giovinazzi (United Kingdom) Tom Blomqvist (Indonesia) Sean Gelael	Nissan VK45DE 4.5 L V8	MI	179
10	LMP2	43	(Mexico) RGR Sport by Morand	(Mexico) Ricardo González (Portugal) Filipe Albuquerque (Brazil) Bruno Senna	Ligier JS P2	D	179
10	LMP2	43	(Mexico) RGR Sport by Morand	(Mexico) Ricardo González (Portugal) Filipe Albuquerque (Brazil) Bruno Senna	Nissan VK45DE 4.5 L V8	D	179
11	LMP2	36	(France) Signatech Alpine	(United States) Gustavo Menezes (France) Nicolas Lapierre (Monaco) Stéphane Richelmi	Alpine A460	D	179
11	LMP2	36	(France) Signatech Alpine	(United States) Gustavo Menezes (France) Nicolas Lapierre (Monaco) Stéphane Richelmi	Nissan VK45DE 4.5 L V8	D	179
12	LMP2	31	(United States) Extreme Speed Motorsports	(United Kingdom) Ryan Dalziel (Brazil) Pipo Derani (Canada) Chris Cumming	Ligier JS P2	MI	179
12	LMP2	31	(United States) Extreme Speed Motorsports	(United Kingdom) Ryan Dalziel (Brazil) Pipo Derani (Canada) Chris Cumming	Nissan VK45DE 4.5 L V8	MI	179
13	LMP2	27	(Russia) SMP Racing	(France) Nicolas Minassian (Italy) Maurizio Mediani (Russia) Mikhail Aleshin	BR Engineering BR01	D	177
13	LMP2	27	(Russia) SMP Racing	(France) Nicolas Minassian (Italy) Maurizio Mediani (Russia) Mikhail Aleshin	Nissan VK45DE 4.5 L V8	D	177
14	LMP2	37	(Russia) SMP Racing	(Russia) Vitaly Petrov (Russia) Kirill Ladygin (Russia) Viktor Shaytar	BR Engineering BR01	D	177
14	LMP2	37	(Russia) SMP Racing	(Russia) Vitaly Petrov (Russia) Kirill Ladygin (Russia) Viktor Shaytar	Nissan VK45DE 4.5 L V8	D	177
15	LMP2	35	(China) Baxi DC Racing Alpine	(United States) David Cheng (China) Ho-Pin Tung (France) Paul-Loup Chatin	Alpine A460	D	176
15	LMP2	35	(China) Baxi DC Racing Alpine	(United States) David Cheng (China) Ho-Pin Tung (France) Paul-Loup Chatin	Nissan VK45DE 4.5 L V8	D	176
16	LMP2	44	(United Kingdom) Manor	(United Kingdom) Matt Rao (United Kingdom) Richard Bradley (United Kingdom) Alex Lynn	Oreca 05	D	174
16	LMP2	44	(United Kingdom) Manor	(United Kingdom) Matt Rao (United Kingdom) Richard Bradley (United Kingdom) Alex Lynn	Nissan VK45DE 4.5 L V8	D	174
17	LMGTE; Pro	67	(United States) Ford Chip Ganassi Team UK	(United Kingdom) Andy Priaulx (United Kingdom) Harry Tincknell	Ford GT	MI	170
17	LMGTE; Pro	67	(United States) Ford Chip Ganassi Team UK	(United Kingdom) Andy Priaulx (United Kingdom) Harry Tincknell	Ford EcoBoost 3.5 L Turbo V6	MI	170
18	LMGTE; Pro	66	(United States) Ford Chip Ganassi Team UK	(Germany) Stefan Mücke (France) Olivier Pla	Ford GT	MI	170
18	LMGTE; Pro	66	(United States) Ford Chip Ganassi Team UK	(Germany) Stefan Mücke (France) Olivier Pla	Ford EcoBoost 3.5 L Turbo V6	MI	170
19	LMGTE; Pro	51	(Italy) AF Corse	(Italy) Gianmaria Bruni (United Kingdom) James Calado	Ferrari 488 GTE	MI	170
19	LMGTE; Pro	51	(Italy) AF Corse	(Italy) Gianmaria Bruni (United Kingdom) James Calado	Ferrari F154CB 3.9 L Turbo V8	MI	170
20	LMGTE; Pro	95	(United Kingdom) Aston Martin Racing	(Denmark) Nicki Thiim (Denmark) Marco Sørensen	Aston Martin V8 Vantage GTE	D	170
20	LMGTE; Pro	95	(United Kingdom) Aston Martin Racing	(Denmark) Nicki Thiim (Denmark) Marco Sørensen	Aston Martin 4.5 L V8	D	170
21	LMGTE; Pro	71	(Italy) AF Corse	(Italy) Davide Rigon (United Kingdom) Sam Bird	Ferrari 488 GTE	MI	168
21	LMGTE; Pro	71	(Italy) AF Corse	(Italy) Davide Rigon (United Kingdom) Sam Bird	Ferrari F154CB 3.9 L Turbo V8	MI	168
22	LMGTE; Pro	77	(Germany) Dempsey-Proton Racing	(Austria) Richard Lietz (Denmark) Michael Christensen	Porsche 911 RSR	MI	168
22	LMGTE; Pro	77	(Germany) Dempsey-Proton Racing	(Austria) Richard Lietz (Denmark) Michael Christensen	Porsche 4.0 L Flat-6	MI	168
23	LMGTE; Am	98	(United Kingdom) Aston Martin Racing	(Canada) Paul Dalla Lana (Portugal) Pedro Lamy (Austria) Mathias Lauda	Aston Martin V8 Vantage GTE	MI	166
23	LMGTE; Am	98	(United Kingdom) Aston Martin Racing	(Canada) Paul Dalla Lana (Portugal) Pedro Lamy (Austria) Mathias Lauda	Aston Martin 4.5 L V8	MI	166
24	LMP1	13	(Switzerland) Rebellion Racing	(Switzerland) Mathéo Tuscher (Austria) Dominik Kraihamer (Switzerland) Alexandre Imperatori	Rebellion R-One	D	166
24	LMP1	13	(Switzerland) Rebellion Racing	(Switzerland) Mathéo Tuscher (Austria) Dominik Kraihamer (Switzerland) Alexandre Imperatori	AER P60 2.4 L Turbo V6	D	166
25	LMGTE; Am	83	(Italy) AF Corse	(France) François Perrodo (France) Emmanuel Collard (Portugal) Rui Águas	Ferrari 458 Italia GT2	MI	166
25	LMGTE; Am	83	(Italy) AF Corse	(France) François Perrodo (France) Emmanuel Collard (Portugal) Rui Águas	Ferrari 4.5 L V8	MI	166
26 (Note: The No. 78 KCMG Porsche was given a 10 second penalty following the race for contact with the No. 83 AF Corse Ferrari. The penalty demoted the KCMG Porsche one position in the race results.)	LMGTE; Am	78	(Hong Kong) KCMG	(Germany) Christian Ried (Germany) Wolf Henzler (Switzerland) Joël Camathias	Porsche 911 RSR	MI	166
26	LMGTE; Am	78	(Hong Kong) KCMG	(Germany) Christian Ried (Germany) Wolf Henzler (Switzerland) Joël Camathias	Porsche 4.0 L Flat-6	MI	166
27	LMGTE; Am	88	(United Arab Emirates) Abu Dhabi-Proton Racing	(United Arab Emirates) Khaled Al Qubaisi (Denmark) David Heinemeier Hansson (United States) Patrick Long	Porsche 911 RSR	MI	166
27	LMGTE; Am	88	(United Arab Emirates) Abu Dhabi-Proton Racing	(United Arab Emirates) Khaled Al Qubaisi (Denmark) David Heinemeier Hansson (United States) Patrick Long	Porsche 4.0 L Flat-6	MI	166
28	LMGTE; Am	50	(France) Larbre Compétition	(France) Pierre Ragues (United States) Ricky Taylor (France) Romain Brandela	Chevrolet Corvette C7.R	MI	164
28	LMGTE; Am	50	(France) Larbre Compétition	(France) Pierre Ragues (United States) Ricky Taylor (France) Romain Brandela	Chevrolet LT5.5 5.5 L V8	MI	164
29	LMGTE; Am	86	(United Kingdom) Gulf Racing	(United Kingdom) Michael Wainwright (United Kingdom) Adam Carroll (United Kingdom) Ben Barker	Porsche 911 RSR	MI	164
29	LMGTE; Am	86	(United Kingdom) Gulf Racing	(United Kingdom) Michael Wainwright (United Kingdom) Adam Carroll (United Kingdom) Ben Barker	Porsche 4.0 L Flat-6	MI	164
DNF	LMGTE; Pro	97	(United Kingdom) Aston Martin Racing	(New Zealand) Richie Stanaway (United Kingdom) Darren Turner	Aston Martin V8 Vantage GTE	D	1
DNF	LMGTE; Pro	97	(United Kingdom) Aston Martin Racing	(New Zealand) Richie Stanaway (United Kingdom) Darren Turner	Aston Martin 4.5 L V8	D	1
DNF	LMP2	45	(United Kingdom) Manor	(Thailand) Tor Graves (Mexico) Roberto González (Switzerland) Mathias Beche	Oreca 05	D	0
DNF	LMP2	45	(United Kingdom) Manor	(Thailand) Tor Graves (Mexico) Roberto González (Switzerland) Mathias Beche	Nissan VK45DE 4.5 L V8	D	0

== Notes ==
FIA World Endurance Championship
Previous race: 6 Hours of Fuji	2016 season	Next race: 6 Hours of Bahrain
