= 2016 6 Hours of Fuji =

Sports car endurance race held at Fuji Speedway, Oyama, Japan

Fuji Speedway track map

The 2016 6 Hours of Fuji was an endurance sports car racing event held at the Fuji Speedway, Oyama, Japan on 14–16 October 2016, and served as the seventh race of the 2016 FIA World Endurance Championship. Toyota's Stéphane Sarrazin, Mike Conway and Kamui Kobayashi won the race driving the No. 6 Toyota Gazoo Racing car.

== Qualifying ==
=== Qualifying result ===
Pole position in Class is in bold.

Pos	Class	Team	Average Time	Grid
1	**LMP1**	**No. 8 Audi Sport Team Joest**	**1:23.570**	**1**
2	LMP1	No. 1 Porsche Team	1:23.595	2
3	LMP1	No. 5 Toyota Gazoo Racing	1:23.739	3
4	LMP1	No. 6 Toyota Gazoo Racing	1:23.781	4
5	LMP1	No. 7 Audi Sport Team Joest	1:23.856	5
6	LMP1	No. 2 Porsche Team	1:24.134	6
7	LMP1	No. 13 Rebellion Racing	1:28.837	7
8	LMP1	No. 4 ByKolles Racing	1:29.827	8
9	**LMP2**	**No. 26 G-Drive Racing**	**1:31.698**	**9**
10	LMP2	No. 36 Signatech Alpine	1:31.919	10
11	LMP2	No. 30 Extreme Speed Motorsports	1:31.945	11
12	LMP2	No. 42 Strakka Racing	1:32.007	12
13	LMP2	No. 43 RGR Sport by Morand	1:32.128	13
14	LMP2	No. 44 Manor	1:32.214	14
15	LMP2	No. 45 Manor	1:32.536	15
16	LMP2	No. 31 Extreme Speed Motorsports	1:32.932	16
17	LMP2	No. 37 SMP Racing	1:33.046	17
18	LMP2	No. 27 SMP Racing	1:33.133	18
19	LMP2	No. 35 Baxi DC Racing Alpine	1:33.472	19
20	**LMGTE-Pro**	**No. 66 Ford Chip Ganassi Team UK**	**1:37.681**	**20**
21	LMGTE-Pro	No. 67 Ford Chip Ganassi Team UK	1:37.725	21
22	LMGTE-Pro	No. 71 AF Corse	1:38.010	22
23	LMGTE-Pro	No. 51 AF Corse	1:38.103	23
24	LMGTE-Pro	No. 95 Aston Martin Racing	1:38.175	24
25	LMGTE-Pro	No. 97 Aston Martin Racing	1:38.442	25
26	LMGTE-Pro	No. 77 Dempsey-Proton Racing	1:38.910	26
27	**LMGTE-Am**	**No. 98 Aston Martin Racing**	**1:39.490**	**27**
28	LMGTE-Am	No. 83 AF Corse	1:39.863	28
29	LMGTE-Am	No. 50 Larbre Compétition	1:39.956	29
30	LMGTE-Am	No. 88 Abu Dhabi-Proton Racing	1:40.587	30
31	LMGTE-Am	No. 78 KCMG	1:40.834	31
32	LMGTE-Am	No. 86 Gulf Racing	1:41.734	32

== Race ==
=== Race result ===
Class winners are denoted with bold.

Pos	Class	No	Team	Drivers	Chassis	Tyre	Laps
Pos	Class	No	Team	Drivers	Engine	Tyre	Laps
1	LMP1	6	(Japan) Toyota Gazoo Racing	(France) Stéphane Sarrazin (United Kingdom) Mike Conway (Japan) Kamui Kobayashi	Toyota TS050 Hybrid	MI	244
1	LMP1	6	(Japan) Toyota Gazoo Racing	(France) Stéphane Sarrazin (United Kingdom) Mike Conway (Japan) Kamui Kobayashi	Toyota 2.4 L Turbo V6	MI	244
2	LMP1	8	(Germany) Audi Sport Team Joest	(Brazil) Lucas di Grassi (France) Loïc Duval (United Kingdom) Oliver Jarvis	Audi R18	MI	244
2	LMP1	8	(Germany) Audi Sport Team Joest	(Brazil) Lucas di Grassi (France) Loïc Duval (United Kingdom) Oliver Jarvis	Audi TDI 4.0 L Turbo Diesel V6	MI	244
3	LMP1	1	(Germany) Porsche Team	(Germany) Timo Bernhard (Australia) Mark Webber (New Zealand) Brendon Hartley	Porsche 919 Hybrid	MI	244
3	LMP1	1	(Germany) Porsche Team	(Germany) Timo Bernhard (Australia) Mark Webber (New Zealand) Brendon Hartley	Porsche 2.0 L Turbo V4	MI	244
4	LMP1	5	(Japan) Toyota Gazoo Racing	(United Kingdom) Anthony Davidson (Switzerland) Sébastien Buemi (Japan) Kazuki Nakajima	Toyota TS050 Hybrid	MI	244
4	LMP1	5	(Japan) Toyota Gazoo Racing	(United Kingdom) Anthony Davidson (Switzerland) Sébastien Buemi (Japan) Kazuki Nakajima	Toyota 2.4 L Turbo V6	MI	244
5	LMP1	2	(Germany) Porsche Team	(France) Romain Dumas (Switzerland) Neel Jani (Germany) Marc Lieb	Porsche 919 Hybrid	MI	243
5	LMP1	2	(Germany) Porsche Team	(France) Romain Dumas (Switzerland) Neel Jani (Germany) Marc Lieb	Porsche 2.0 L Turbo V4	MI	243
6	LMP1	13	(Switzerland) Rebellion Racing	(Switzerland) Mathéo Tuscher (Austria) Dominik Kraihamer (Switzerland) Alexandre Imperatori	Rebellion R-One	D	229
6	LMP1	13	(Switzerland) Rebellion Racing	(Switzerland) Mathéo Tuscher (Austria) Dominik Kraihamer (Switzerland) Alexandre Imperatori	AER P60 2.4 L Turbo V6	D	229
7	LMP2	26	(Russia) G-Drive Racing	(Russia) Roman Rusinov (United Kingdom) Alex Brundle (United Kingdom) Will Stevens	Oreca 05	D	223
7	LMP2	26	(Russia) G-Drive Racing	(Russia) Roman Rusinov (United Kingdom) Alex Brundle (United Kingdom) Will Stevens	Nissan VK45DE 4.5 L V8	D	223
8	LMP2	43	(Mexico) RGR Sport by Morand	(Mexico) Ricardo González (Portugal) Filipe Albuquerque (Brazil) Bruno Senna	Ligier JS P2	D	223
8	LMP2	43	(Mexico) RGR Sport by Morand	(Mexico) Ricardo González (Portugal) Filipe Albuquerque (Brazil) Bruno Senna	Nissan VK45DE 4.5 L V8	D	223
9	LMP2	36	(France) Signatech Alpine	(United States) Gustavo Menezes (France) Nicolas Lapierre (Monaco) Stéphane Richelmi	Alpine A460	D	223
9	LMP2	36	(France) Signatech Alpine	(United States) Gustavo Menezes (France) Nicolas Lapierre (Monaco) Stéphane Richelmi	Nissan VK45DE 4.5 L V8	D	223
10	LMP2	30	(United States) Extreme Speed Motorsports	(Italy) Antonio Giovinazzi (Netherlands) Giedo van der Garde (Indonesia) Sean Gelael	Ligier JS P2	MI	223
10	LMP2	30	(United States) Extreme Speed Motorsports	(Italy) Antonio Giovinazzi (Netherlands) Giedo van der Garde (Indonesia) Sean Gelael	Nissan VK45DE 4.5 L V8	MI	223
11	LMP2	31	(United States) Extreme Speed Motorsports	(United Kingdom) Ryan Dalziel (Brazil) Pipo Derani (Canada) Chris Cumming	Ligier JS P2	MI	222
11	LMP2	31	(United States) Extreme Speed Motorsports	(United Kingdom) Ryan Dalziel (Brazil) Pipo Derani (Canada) Chris Cumming	Nissan VK45DE 4.5 L V8	MI	222
12	LMP2	42	(United Kingdom) Strakka Racing	(United Kingdom) Jonny Kane (United Kingdom) Lewis Williamson	Gibson 015S	D	222
12	LMP2	42	(United Kingdom) Strakka Racing	(United Kingdom) Jonny Kane (United Kingdom) Lewis Williamson	Nissan VK45DE 4.5 L V8	D	222
13	LMP2	44	(United Kingdom) Manor	(United Kingdom) Matt Rao (United Kingdom) Richard Bradley (Spain) Roberto Merhi	Oreca 05	D	222
13	LMP2	44	(United Kingdom) Manor	(United Kingdom) Matt Rao (United Kingdom) Richard Bradley (Spain) Roberto Merhi	Nissan VK45DE 4.5 L V8	D	222
14	LMP2	27	(Russia) SMP Racing	(France) Nicolas Minassian (Italy) Maurizio Mediani (Russia) Mikhail Aleshin	BR Engineering BR01	D	222
14	LMP2	27	(Russia) SMP Racing	(France) Nicolas Minassian (Italy) Maurizio Mediani (Russia) Mikhail Aleshin	Nissan VK45DE 4.5 L V8	D	222
15	LMP2	35	(China) Baxi DC Racing Alpine	(United States) David Cheng (China) Ho-Pin Tung (France) Paul-Loup Chatin	Alpine A460	D	221
15	LMP2	35	(China) Baxi DC Racing Alpine	(United States) David Cheng (China) Ho-Pin Tung (France) Paul-Loup Chatin	Nissan VK45DE 4.5 L V8	D	221
16	LMP2	37	(Russia) SMP Racing	(Russia) Vitaly Petrov (Russia) Kirill Ladygin (Russia) Viktor Shaytar	BR Engineering BR01	D	220
16	LMP2	37	(Russia) SMP Racing	(Russia) Vitaly Petrov (Russia) Kirill Ladygin (Russia) Viktor Shaytar	Nissan VK45DE 4.5 L V8	D	220
17	LMGTE; Pro	67	(United States) Ford Chip Ganassi Team UK	(United Kingdom) Andy Priaulx (United Kingdom) Harry Tincknell	Ford GT	MI	212
17	LMGTE; Pro	67	(United States) Ford Chip Ganassi Team UK	(United Kingdom) Andy Priaulx (United Kingdom) Harry Tincknell	Ford EcoBoost 3.5 L Turbo V6	MI	212
18	LMGTE; Pro	66	(United States) Ford Chip Ganassi Team UK	(Germany) Stefan Mücke (France) Olivier Pla	Ford GT	MI	212
18	LMGTE; Pro	66	(United States) Ford Chip Ganassi Team UK	(Germany) Stefan Mücke (France) Olivier Pla	Ford EcoBoost 3.5 L Turbo V6	MI	212
19	LMGTE; Pro	51	(Italy) AF Corse	(Italy) Gianmaria Bruni (United Kingdom) James Calado	Ferrari 488 GTE	MI	212
19	LMGTE; Pro	51	(Italy) AF Corse	(Italy) Gianmaria Bruni (United Kingdom) James Calado	Ferrari F154CB 3.9 L Turbo V8	MI	212
20	LMGTE; Pro	71	(Italy) AF Corse	(Italy) Davide Rigon (United Kingdom) Sam Bird	Ferrari 488 GTE	MI	212
20	LMGTE; Pro	71	(Italy) AF Corse	(Italy) Davide Rigon (United Kingdom) Sam Bird	Ferrari F154CB 3.9 L Turbo V8	MI	212
21	LMGTE; Pro	95	(United Kingdom) Aston Martin Racing	(Denmark) Nicki Thiim (Denmark) Marco Sørensen	Aston Martin V8 Vantage GTE	D	211
21	LMGTE; Pro	95	(United Kingdom) Aston Martin Racing	(Denmark) Nicki Thiim (Denmark) Marco Sørensen	Aston Martin 4.5 L V8	D	211
22	LMGTE; Pro	97	(United Kingdom) Aston Martin Racing	(New Zealand) Richie Stanaway (United Kingdom) Darren Turner	Aston Martin V8 Vantage GTE	D	211
22	LMGTE; Pro	97	(United Kingdom) Aston Martin Racing	(New Zealand) Richie Stanaway (United Kingdom) Darren Turner	Aston Martin 4.5 L V8	D	211
23	LMGTE; Pro	77	(Germany) Dempsey-Proton Racing	(Austria) Richard Lietz (Denmark) Michael Christensen	Porsche 911 RSR	MI	210
23	LMGTE; Pro	77	(Germany) Dempsey-Proton Racing	(Austria) Richard Lietz (Denmark) Michael Christensen	Porsche 4.0 L Flat-6	MI	210
24	LMGTE; Am	98	(United Kingdom) Aston Martin Racing	(Canada) Paul Dalla Lana (Portugal) Pedro Lamy (Austria) Mathias Lauda	Aston Martin V8 Vantage GTE	MI	208
24	LMGTE; Am	98	(United Kingdom) Aston Martin Racing	(Canada) Paul Dalla Lana (Portugal) Pedro Lamy (Austria) Mathias Lauda	Aston Martin 4.5 L V8	MI	208
25	LMGTE; Am	83	(Italy) AF Corse	(France) François Perrodo (France) Emmanuel Collard (Portugal) Rui Águas	Ferrari 458 Italia GT2	MI	207
25	LMGTE; Am	83	(Italy) AF Corse	(France) François Perrodo (France) Emmanuel Collard (Portugal) Rui Águas	Ferrari 4.5 L V8	MI	207
26	LMGTE; Am	78	(Hong Kong) KCMG	(Germany) Christian Ried (Germany) Wolf Henzler (Switzerland) Joël Camathias	Porsche 911 RSR	MI	206
26	LMGTE; Am	78	(Hong Kong) KCMG	(Germany) Christian Ried (Germany) Wolf Henzler (Switzerland) Joël Camathias	Porsche 4.0 L Flat-6	MI	206
27	LMGTE; Am	86	(United Kingdom) Gulf Racing	(United Kingdom) Michael Wainwright (United Kingdom) Adam Carroll (United Kingdom) Ben Barker	Porsche 911 RSR	MI	205
27	LMGTE; Am	86	(United Kingdom) Gulf Racing	(United Kingdom) Michael Wainwright (United Kingdom) Adam Carroll (United Kingdom) Ben Barker	Porsche 4.0 L Flat-6	MI	205
28	LMGTE; Am	88	(United Arab Emirates) Abu Dhabi-Proton Racing	(United Arab Emirates) Khaled Al Qubaisi (Denmark) David Heinemeier Hansson (United States) Patrick Long	Porsche 911 RSR	MI	200
28	LMGTE; Am	88	(United Arab Emirates) Abu Dhabi-Proton Racing	(United Arab Emirates) Khaled Al Qubaisi (Denmark) David Heinemeier Hansson (United States) Patrick Long	Porsche 4.0 L Flat-6	MI	200
29	LMP2	45	(United Kingdom) Manor	(Thailand) Tor Graves (United Kingdom) Alex Lynn (Japan) Shinji Nakano	Oreca 05	D	190
29	LMP2	45	(United Kingdom) Manor	(Thailand) Tor Graves (United Kingdom) Alex Lynn (Japan) Shinji Nakano	Nissan VK45DE 4.5 L V8	D	190
30	LMGTE; Am	50	(France) Larbre Compétition	(Japan) Yutaka Yamagishi (France) Pierre Ragues (United States) Ricky Taylor	Chevrolet Corvette C7.R	MI	147 (Note: The No. 50 Larbre Compétition Chevrolet was penalized by the stewards after the race for failing to achieve the minimum driver time for Ricky Taylor. Twenty-five laps was added to race time for Larbre Compétition to account for the amount of time Taylor was short of his requirement.)
30	LMGTE; Am	50	(France) Larbre Compétition	(Japan) Yutaka Yamagishi (France) Pierre Ragues (United States) Ricky Taylor	Chevrolet LT5.5 5.5 L V8	MI	147
DNF	LMP1	4	(Austria) ByKolles Racing Team	(Switzerland) Simon Trummer (United Kingdom) Oliver Webb (Germany) Pierre Kaffer	CLM P1/01	D	79
DNF	LMP1	4	(Austria) ByKolles Racing Team	(Switzerland) Simon Trummer (United Kingdom) Oliver Webb (Germany) Pierre Kaffer	AER P60 2.4 L Turbo V6	D	79
DNF	LMP1	7	(Germany) Audi Sport Team Joest	(Switzerland) Marcel Fässler (Germany) André Lotterer (France) Benoît Tréluyer	Audi R18	MI	36
DNF	LMP1	7	(Germany) Audi Sport Team Joest	(Switzerland) Marcel Fässler (Germany) André Lotterer (France) Benoît Tréluyer	Audi TDI 4.0 L Turbo Diesel V6	MI	36

=== Notes ===
FIA World Endurance Championship
Previous race: 6 Hours of COTA	2016 season	Next race: 6 Hours of Shanghai
