= Richard Bradley (racing driver) =

British racing driver

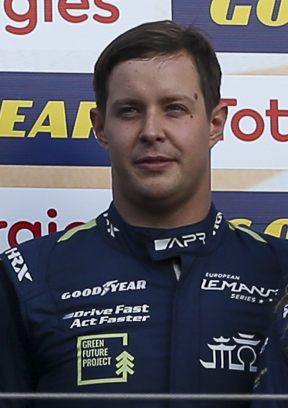
- Bradley in 2021
- Nationality: (United Kingdom) British
- Born: Richard Edward Bradley; 17 August 1991 (age 35) Greenwich, England

Super Formula career
- Debut season: 2013
- Current team: KCMG
- Categorisation: FIA Gold
- Car number: 18

Previous series
- 2012 2011–12 2010: FIA European F3 Championship; All-Japan Formula Three; Formula BMW Pacific

Championship titles
- 2010: Formula BMW Pacific

Richard Edward Bradley (born 17 August 1991) is a British racing driver. Born in the UK, raised in Singapore and based in Bangkok, Bradley has competed in the FIA World Endurance Championship, European Le Mans Series and Super Formula. He is a 24 Hours of Le Mans class winner in LMP2 for KCMG in 2015.

== Career ==
=== Karting ===
Bradley began his racing career in karting at the age of eleven and raced in various international championships, progressing to KF1 category in 2008, finishing eighth in the CIK-FIA European Championship.

=== Formula BMW Pacific ===
In 2010, Bradley graduated to single–seaters into the Formula BMW Pacific series in Asia, joining Eurasia Motorsport and racing under a Singaporean racing licence. He dominated from the opening round at Sepang and achieved seven wins on his way to both championship and Rookie titles.

=== Formula Three ===
In 2011, Bradley graduated to the All-Japan Formula Three Championship with Petronas Team TOM'S. He finished fifth with two podiums. During the season, he also appeared in the Pau and Macau rounds of the FIA Formula 3 International Trophy.

For the next year, Bradley continued in All-Japan Formula Three Championship with TOM'S. He scored six podiums and progressed to the fourth place in the championship standings. He also contested in the Spa round of the FIA European Formula 3 Championship. Bradley also contested the end of year Formula Nippon test for Petronas Team TOM'S.

=== Super Formula ===
Bradley made his debut in the Super Formula in 2013 with KCMG, finishing 21st in the standings.

== Racing record ==
=== Career summary ===
| Season | Series | Team | Races | Wins | Poles | FLaps | Podiums | Points | Position |
|---|---|---|---|---|---|---|---|---|---|
| 2010 | Formula BMW Pacific | Eurasia Motorsport | 15 | 7 | 2 | 3 | 9 | 217 | **1st** |
| 2011 | Japanese Formula 3 Championship | Petronas Team TOM'S | 14 | 0 | 0 | 0 | 2 | 36 | 5th |
| 2011 | Macau Grand Prix | Petronas Team TOM'S | 1 | 0 | 0 | 0 | 0 | N/A | 9th |
| 2011 | FIA Formula 3 International Trophy | Petronas Team TOM'S | 2 | 0 | 0 | 0 | 0 | 0 | NC† |
| 2011 | FIA Formula 3 International Trophy | Carlin | 1 | 0 | 0 | 0 | 0 | 0 | NC† |
| 2012 | Japanese Formula 3 Championship | Petronas Team TOM'S | 15 | 0 | 0 | 1 | 6 | 52 | 4th |
| 2012 | FIA Formula 3 European Championship | Carlin | 2 | 0 | 0 | 0 | 0 | 6 | 19th |
| 2013 | Super Formula | KCMG | 7 | 0 | 0 | 0 | 0 | 0 | 21st |
| 2013 | Asian Le Mans Series - LMP2 | KCMG | 1 | 1 | 0 | 0 | 1 | 40 | 5th |
| 2013 | Asian Le Mans Series - LMP2 | Craft Racing | 1 | 0 | 0 | 0 | 1 | 40 | 5th |
| 2013 | FIA World Endurance Championship - LMP2 | KCMG | 1 | 0 | 0 | 0 | 0 | 0 | NC† |
| 2014 | FIA World Endurance Championship - LMP2 | KCMG | 8 | 3 | 1 | 0 | 6 | 130 | **3rd** |
| 2014 | 24 Hours of Le Mans - LMP2 | KCMG | 1 | 0 | 0 | 0 | 0 | N/A | DNF |
| 2015 | FIA World Endurance Championship - LMP2 | KCMG | 8 | 2 | 2 | 0 | 6 | 155 | **2nd** |
| 2015 | 24 Hours of Le Mans - LMP2 | KCMG | 1 | 1 | 1 | 0 | 1 | N/A | **1st** |
| 2015 | European Le Mans Series - LMP2 | Eurasia Motorsport | 1 | 0 | 0 | 0 | 0 | 0 | 21st |
| 2016 | FIA World Endurance Championship - LMP2 | Manor | 8 | 0 | 1 | 0 | 1 | 33 | 17th |
| 2016 | 24 Hours of Le Mans - LMP2 | KCMG | 1 | 0 | 0 | 0 | 0 | N/A | DNF |
| 2016 | IMSA SportsCar Championship - PC | Starworks Motorsport | 5 | 0 | 0 | 0 | 1 | 110 | 15th |
| 2017 | European Le Mans Series - LMP2 | Graff | 6 | 2 | 0 | 1 | 2 | 86 | **3rd** |
| 2017 | 24 Hours of Le Mans - LMP2 | Graff | 1 | 0 | 0 | 0 | 0 | N/A | 5th |
| 2017 | Michelin Le Mans Cup - LMP3 | Graff | 1 | 0 | 0 | 0 | 0 | 5 | 31st |
| 2017 | Michelin Le Mans Cup - LMP3 | Win Motorsport | 2 | 0 | 0 | 0 | 0 | 5 | 31st |
| 2017–18 | Asian Le Mans Series - LMP3 | WIN Motorsport | 4 | 0 | 0 | 0 | 2 | 40 | 5th |
| 2018 | Super GT - GT300 | Dijon Racing | 5 | 0 | 0 | 0 | 0 | 0 | NC |
| 2019 | European Le Mans Series - LMP2 | Duqueine Engineering | 6 | 0 | 0 | 0 | 1 | 45 | 9th |
| 2020 | European Le Mans Series - LMP2 | IDEC Sport | 5 | 0 | 0 | 0 | 0 | 21 | 10th |
| 2021 | European Le Mans Series - LMP2 | Algarve Pro Racing | 6 | 0 | 0 | 0 | 1 | 27.5 | 13th |
| 2022 | European Le Mans Series - LMP2 | Duqueine Team | 6 | 0 | 0 | 0 | 0 | 20 | 14th |
| 2022 | FIA World Endurance Championship - LMP2 | ARC Bratislava | 1 | 0 | 0 | 0 | 0 | 0 | 28th |
| 2023 | Masters Endurance Legends - Prototypes | DAMAX | 2 | 0 | 0 | 0 | 2 | 10 | 28th |
| 2023 | Endurance Racing Legends - LMP2B | MacKellar | 2 | 0 | 0 | 0 | 0 | 23 | 9th |
| 2024 | European Le Mans Series - LMP2 Pro-Am | Algarve Pro Racing | 6 | 1 | 0 | 0 | 4 | 96 | **2nd** |

† – As Bradley was a guest driver, he was ineligible for points.

=== Complete Super Formula Results ===
(Races in bold indicate pole position)

| Year | Team | Engine | 1 | 2 | 3 | 4 | 5 | 6 | 7 | DC | Points |
|---|---|---|---|---|---|---|---|---|---|---|---|
| 2013 | KCMG | Toyota | SUZ; 19 | AUT; Ret | FUJ; Ret | MOT; 14 | SUG; Ret | SUZ; 13 | SUZ; 18 | 21st | 0 |

=== Complete FIA World Endurance Championship results ===
| Year | Entrant | Class | Car | Engine | 1 | 2 | 3 | 4 | 5 | 6 | 7 | 8 | 9 | Rank | Points |
|---|---|---|---|---|---|---|---|---|---|---|---|---|---|---|---|
| 2013 | KCMG | LMP2 | Morgan LMP2 | Nissan VK45DE 4.5 L V8 | SIL | SPA | LMS | SÃO | COA | FUJ; 6 | SHA | BHR | | NC† | 0† |
| 2014 | KCMG | LMP2 | Oreca 03 | Nissan VK45DE 4.5 L V8 | SIL; 2 | **SPA**; 2 | | | | | | | | **3rd** | **130** |
| 2014 | KCMG | LMP2 | Oreca 03R | Nissan VK45DE 4.5 L V8 | | | LMS; Ret | COA; 1 | FUJ; 2 | SHA; Ret | BHR; 1 | SÃO; 1 | | **3rd** | **130** |
| 2015 | KCMG | LMP2 | Oreca 05 | Nissan VK45DE 4.5 L V8 | SIL; 4 | SPA; 3 | **LMS**; 1 | **NÜR**; 1 | COA; 2 | FUJ; Ret | SHA; 3 | BHR; 2 | | 2nd | 155 |
| 2016 | Manor | LMP2 | Oreca 05 | Nissan VK45DE 4.5 L V8 | SIL; 6 | SPA; 3 | LMS | NÜR; Ret | MEX; Ret | COA; Ret | FUJ; 7 | **SHA**; 9 | BHR; 10 | 17th | 33 |

^{†} As Bradley was a guest driver, he was ineligible for points.

=== Complete 24 Hours of Le Mans results ===
| Year | Team | Co-Drivers | Car | Class | Laps | Pos. | Class Pos. |
|---|---|---|---|---|---|---|---|
| 2014 | (Hong Kong) KCMG | (United Kingdom) Matthew Howson (Switzerland) Alexandre Imperatori | Oreca 03R-Nissan | LMP2 | 87 | DNF | DNF |
| 2015 | (Hong Kong) KCMG | (United Kingdom) Matthew Howson (France) Nicolas Lapierre | Oreca 05-Nissan | LMP2 | 358 | 9th | **1st** |
| 2016 | (Hong Kong) KCMG | (United Kingdom) Matthew Howson (Japan) Tsugio Matsuda | Oreca 05-Nissan | LMP2 | 116 | DNF | DNF |
| 2017 | (France) Graff | (Australia) James Allen (France) Franck Matelli | Oreca 07-Gibson | LMP2 | 361 | 6th | 5th |
| 2020 | (France) IDEC Sport | (France) Paul-Loup Chatin (France) Paul Lafargue | Oreca 07-Gibson | LMP2 | 366 | 10th | 6th |
| 2022 | (France) Duqueine Team | (France) Reshad de Gerus (Mexico) Memo Rojas | Oreca 07-Gibson | LMP2 | 326 | 52nd | 25th |

=== Complete European Le Mans Series results ===
| Year | Entrant | Class | Chassis | Engine | 1 | 2 | 3 | 4 | 5 | 6 | Rank | Points |
|---|---|---|---|---|---|---|---|---|---|---|---|---|
| 2015 | Eurasia Motorsport | LMP2 | Oreca 03R | Nissan VK45DE 4.5 L V8 | SIL | IMO | RBR | LEC; Ret | EST | | 21st | 0 |
| 2017 | Graff | LMP2 | Oreca 07 | Gibson GK428 4.2 L V8 | SIL; 4 | MNZ; 8 | RBR; 4 | LEC; 6 | SPA; 1 | ALG; 1 | 3rd | 86 |
| 2019 | Duqueine Engineering | LMP2 | Oreca 07 | Gibson GK428 4.2 L V8 | LEC; 3 | MNZ; 6 | CAT; 4 | SIL; Ret | SPA; 5 | ALG; Ret | 9th | 45 |
| 2020 | IDEC Sport | LMP2 | Oreca 07 | Gibson GK428 4.2 L V8 | LEC; Ret | SPA; 7 | LEC; 7 | MNZ; 6 | ALG; 10 | | 10th | 21 |
| 2021 | Algarve Pro Racing | LMP2 | Oreca 07 | Gibson GK428 4.2 L V8 | CAT; 11 | RBR; 8 | LEC; 7 | MNZ; 10 | SPA; Ret | ALG; 3 | 13th | 27.5 |
| 2022 | Duqueine Team | LMP2 | Oreca 07 | Gibson GK428 4.2 L V8 | LEC; 12 | IMO; 6 | MNZ; Ret | CAT; 6 | SPA; 9 | ALG; 9 | 14th | 20 |
| 2024 | Algarve Pro Racing | LMP2 Pro-Am | Oreca 07 | Gibson GK428 4.2 L V8 | CAT; 4 | LEC; 6 | IMO; 1 | SPA; 3 | MUG; 2 | ALG; 2 | 2nd | 96 |

=== Complete IMSA SportsCar Championship results ===
(key) (Races in bold indicate pole position, Results are overall/class)

| Year | Entrant | Class | Make | Engine | 1 | 2 | 3 | 4 | 5 | 6 | 7 | 8 | 9 | 10 | 11 | Rank | Points |
|---|---|---|---|---|---|---|---|---|---|---|---|---|---|---|---|---|---|
| 2016 | Starworks Motorsport | PC | Oreca FLM09 | Chevrolet LS3 6.2 V8 | DAY | SEB | LBH | LAG | DET | WGL; 3 | MOS; 7 | LIM | ROA; 9† | COA; 8 | PET; 4 | 15th | 110 |

^{†} Bradley did not complete sufficient laps in order to score points.

=== Complete Super GT results ===
(key) (Races in bold indicate pole position) (Races in italics indicate fastest lap)

| Year | Team | Car | Class | 1 | 2 | 3 | 4 | 5 | 6 | 7 | 8 | Pos. | Pts |
|---|---|---|---|---|---|---|---|---|---|---|---|---|---|
| 2018 | Dijon Racing | Nissan GT-R Nismo GT3 | GT300 | OKA | FUJ; 21 | SUZ; 22 | CHA | FUJ; 18 | SUG | AUT; 28 | MOT; 26 | NC | 0 |

Sporting positions
| Preceded by Rio Haryanto | Formula BMW Pacific; Champion; 2010 | Succeeded by Lucas Auer (JK Racing Asia Series) |
