= 2016 FIA World Endurance Championship =

Auto racing series

- Organizer: Fédération Internationale de l'Automobile; Automobile Club de l'Ouest
- Discipline: Sports car endurance racing
- Number of races: 9

Champions
- LMP1 Manufacturer: (Germany) Porsche
- GTE Manufacturer: (Italy) Ferrari
- LMP1 Team: (Switzerland) Rebellion Racing
- LMP2 Team: (France) Signatech Alpine
- LMGTE Pro Team: (United Kingdom) Aston Martin Racing
- LMGTE Am Team: (Italy) AF Corse

FIA World Endurance Championship
- ← 2015 2017 →

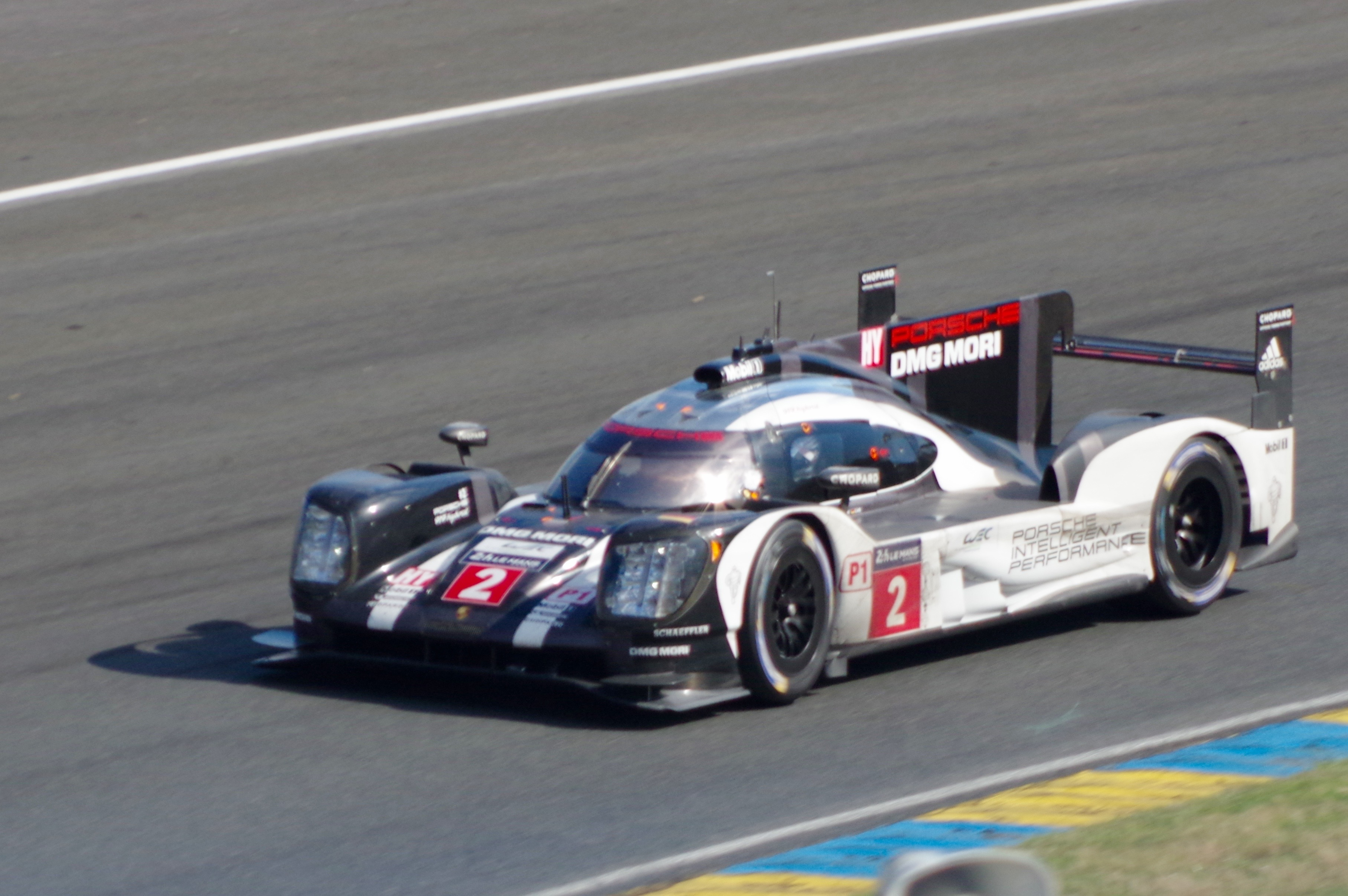
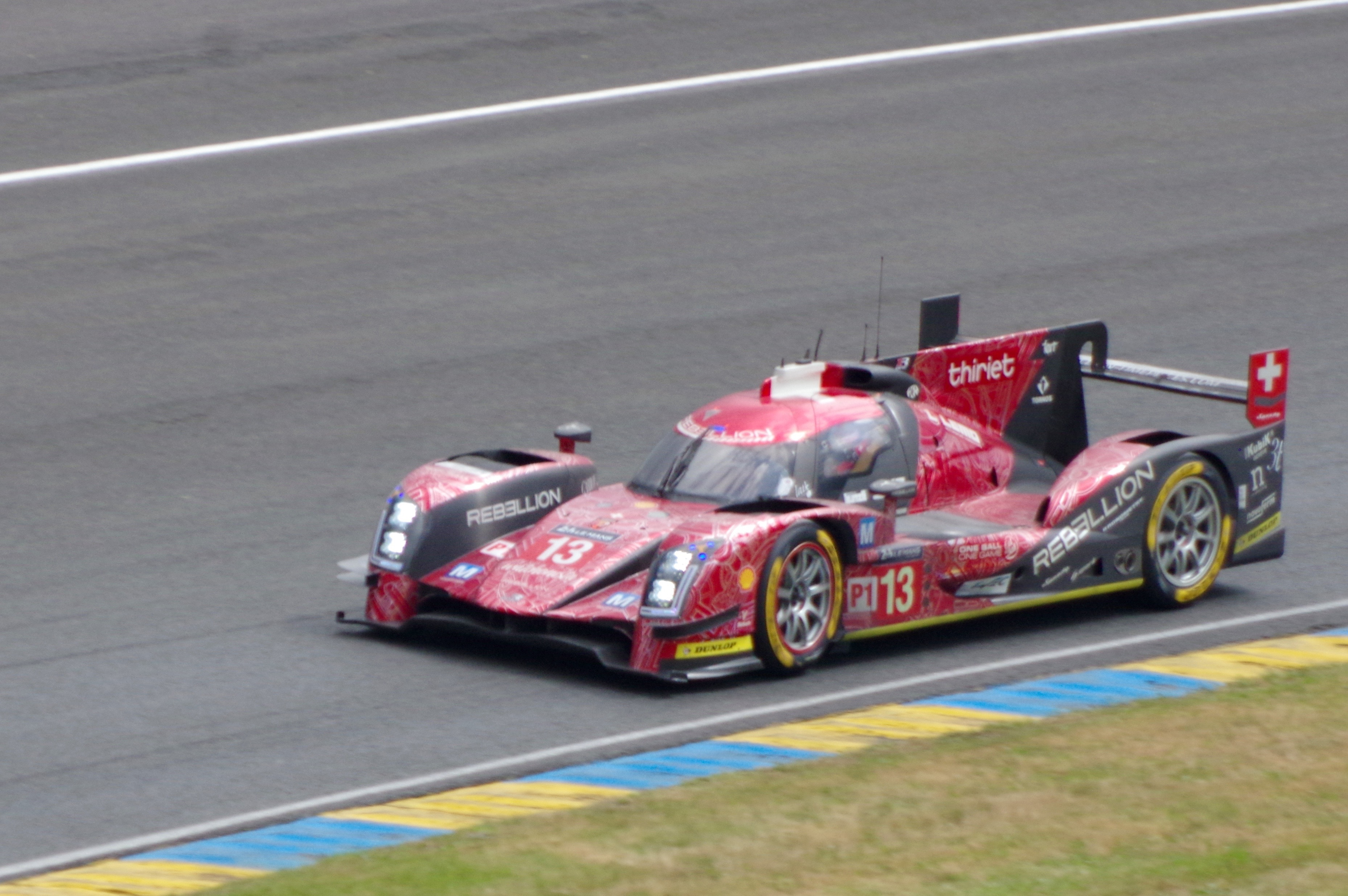
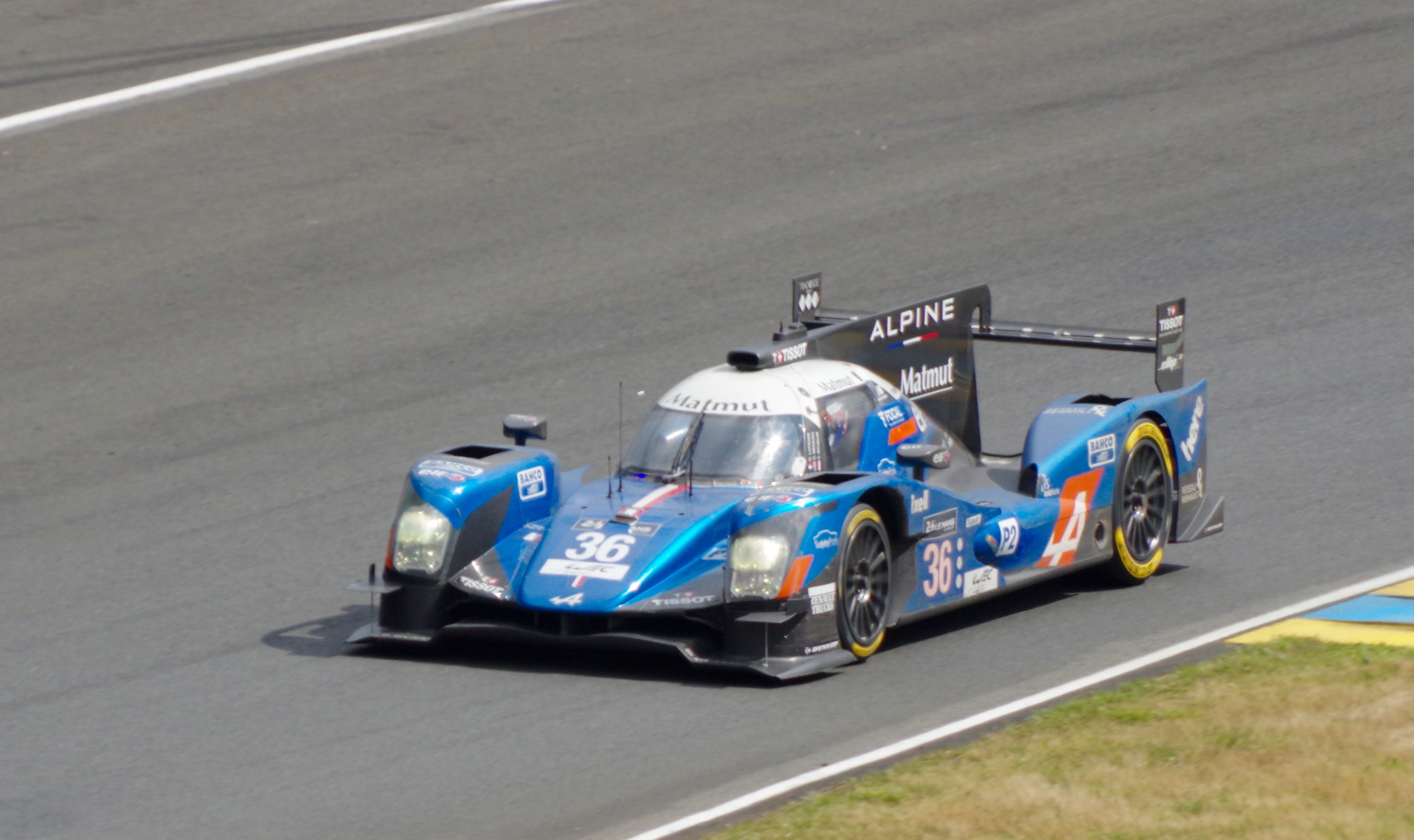
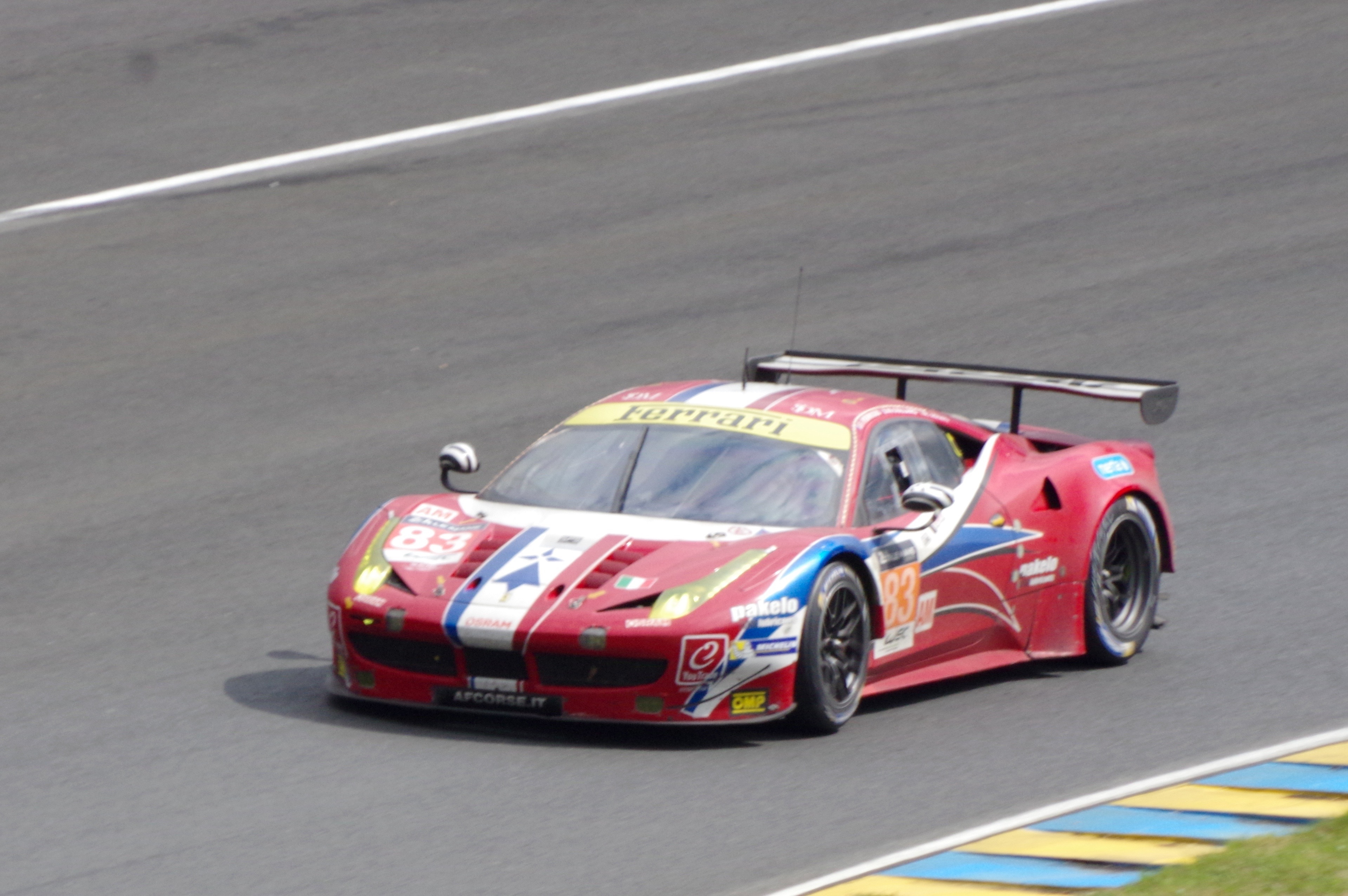
The No. 2 Porsche Racing drivers won the World Endurance Drivers' Championship, with Porsche also winning the World Endurance Manufacturers' Championship. The No. 13 Rebellion Racing won the FIA Endurance Trophy for LMP1 Private Team in Drivers' and Team' championships. The No. 35 Signatech Alpine won the LMP2 Teams' and Drivers' championships. The No. 83 AF Corse won the LMGTE Am Teams and Drivers' championships.

The 2016 FIA World Endurance Championship season was the fifth edition of the FIA World Endurance Championship auto racing series co-organised by the Fédération Internationale de l'Automobile (FIA) and the Automobile Club de l'Ouest (ACO). The series was open to Le Mans Prototypes and grand tourer-style racing cars meeting four ACO categories. The season began at the Silverstone Circuit in April and ended at the Bahrain International Circuit in November, and included the 84th running of the 24 Hours of Le Mans. This season was also the last WEC season for Audi Sport Team Joest as they decided not to race in the 2017 FIA World Endurance Championship Season.

== Schedule ==
The ACO announced a provisional calendar during the 2015 6 Hours of Circuit of the Americas in September 2015. The calendar retains the eight rounds from 2015, but adds the 6 Hours of Mexico City at the Autódromo Hermanos Rodríguez. The World Sportscar Championship previously visited Mexico City in 1991. The Nürburgring round has been moved a month forward to July to close the gap after Le Mans.

A test session was held prior to the start of the season at Circuit Paul Ricard in March, while the mandatory test for the 24 Hours of Le Mans was held in the first week of June.

Rnd	Race	Circuit	Location	Date
	Prologue	Circuit Paul Ricard	(France) Le Castellet, Var	25/26 March
1	6 Hours of Silverstone	Silverstone Circuit	(United Kingdom) Silverstone	17 April
2	WEC 6 Hours of Spa-Francorchamps	Circuit de Spa-Francorchamps	(Belgium) Stavelot	7 May
3	24 Hours of Le Mans	Circuit de la Sarthe	(France) Le Mans	18–19 June
4	6 Hours of Nürburgring	Nürburgring	(Germany) Nürburg	24 July
5	6 Hours of Mexico	Autódromo Hermanos Rodríguez	Mexico City	3 September
6	6 Hours of Circuit of the Americas	Circuit of the Americas	(United States) Austin, Texas	17 September
7	6 Hours of Fuji	Fuji Speedway	(Japan) Oyama, Shizuoka	16 October
8	6 Hours of Shanghai	Shanghai International Circuit	(China) Shanghai	6 November
9	6 Hours of Bahrain	Bahrain International Circuit	(Bahrain) Sakhir	19 November

== Entries ==
The FIA unveiled an entry of 32 cars for the 2016 season on 5 February in Paris, divided into four categories: Le Mans Prototype 1 (LMP1) and 2 (LMP2), and Le Mans Grand Touring Endurance Professional (LMGTE Pro) and Amateur (LMGTE Am).

=== LMP1 ===
Key
Full-season entry	Additional entry (†)
Eligible for all championship points	Eligible only for Drivers' championship points

Entrant/Team	Car	Engine	Hybrid	Tyre	No.	Drivers	Rounds
(Germany) Porsche Team	Porsche 919 Hybrid	Porsche 9R9 2.0 L Turbo V4	Hybrid	M	1	(Germany) Timo Bernhard	All
(Germany) Porsche Team	Porsche 919 Hybrid	Porsche 9R9 2.0 L Turbo V4	Hybrid	M	1	(Australia) Mark Webber	All
(Germany) Porsche Team	Porsche 919 Hybrid	Porsche 9R9 2.0 L Turbo V4	Hybrid	M	1	(New Zealand) Brendon Hartley	All
(Germany) Porsche Team	Porsche 919 Hybrid	Porsche 9R9 2.0 L Turbo V4	Hybrid	M	2	(France) Romain Dumas	All
(Germany) Porsche Team	Porsche 919 Hybrid	Porsche 9R9 2.0 L Turbo V4	Hybrid	M	2	(Switzerland) Neel Jani	All
(Germany) Porsche Team	Porsche 919 Hybrid	Porsche 9R9 2.0 L Turbo V4	Hybrid	M	2	(Germany) Marc Lieb	All
(Austria) ByKolles Racing Team	CLM P1/01	AER P60 2.0 L Turbo V6		D	4	(Switzerland) Simon Trummer	All
(Austria) ByKolles Racing Team	CLM P1/01	AER P60 2.0 L Turbo V6		D	4	(United Kingdom) Oliver Webb	All
(Austria) ByKolles Racing Team	CLM P1/01	AER P60 2.0 L Turbo V6		D	4	(United Kingdom) James Rossiter	1–2
(Austria) ByKolles Racing Team	CLM P1/01	AER P60 2.0 L Turbo V6		D	4	(Germany) Pierre Kaffer	3–5, 7–9
(Japan) Toyota Gazoo Racing	Toyota TS050 Hybrid	Toyota H8909 2.4 L Turbo V6	Hybrid	M	5	(Switzerland) Sébastien Buemi	All
(Japan) Toyota Gazoo Racing	Toyota TS050 Hybrid	Toyota H8909 2.4 L Turbo V6	Hybrid	M	5	(Japan) Kazuki Nakajima	All
(Japan) Toyota Gazoo Racing	Toyota TS050 Hybrid	Toyota H8909 2.4 L Turbo V6	Hybrid	M	5	(United Kingdom) Anthony Davidson	1–4, 6–9
(Japan) Toyota Gazoo Racing	Toyota TS050 Hybrid	Toyota H8909 2.4 L Turbo V6	Hybrid	M	6	(United Kingdom) Mike Conway	All
(Japan) Toyota Gazoo Racing	Toyota TS050 Hybrid	Toyota H8909 2.4 L Turbo V6	Hybrid	M	6	(France) Stéphane Sarrazin	All
(Japan) Toyota Gazoo Racing	Toyota TS050 Hybrid	Toyota H8909 2.4 L Turbo V6	Hybrid	M	6	(Japan) Kamui Kobayashi	All
(Germany) Audi Sport Team Joest	Audi R18	Audi TDI 4.0 L Turbo Diesel V6	Hybrid	M	7	(Germany) André Lotterer	All
(Germany) Audi Sport Team Joest	Audi R18	Audi TDI 4.0 L Turbo Diesel V6	Hybrid	M	7	(Switzerland) Marcel Fässler	All
(Germany) Audi Sport Team Joest	Audi R18	Audi TDI 4.0 L Turbo Diesel V6	Hybrid	M	7	(France) Benoît Tréluyer	1–3, 5–9
(Germany) Audi Sport Team Joest	Audi R18	Audi TDI 4.0 L Turbo Diesel V6	Hybrid	M	8	(United Kingdom) Oliver Jarvis	All
(Germany) Audi Sport Team Joest	Audi R18	Audi TDI 4.0 L Turbo Diesel V6	Hybrid	M	8	(Brazil) Lucas di Grassi	All
(Germany) Audi Sport Team Joest	Audi R18	Audi TDI 4.0 L Turbo Diesel V6	Hybrid	M	8	(France) Loïc Duval	All
(Switzerland) Rebellion Racing	Rebellion R-One	AER P60 2.0 L Turbo V6		D	12	(Germany) Nick Heidfeld	1–4
(Switzerland) Rebellion Racing	Rebellion R-One	AER P60 2.0 L Turbo V6		D	12	(France) Nicolas Prost	1–4
(Switzerland) Rebellion Racing	Rebellion R-One	AER P60 2.0 L Turbo V6		D	12	(Brazil) Nelson Piquet Jr.	1–3
(Switzerland) Rebellion Racing	Rebellion R-One	AER P60 2.0 L Turbo V6		D	12	(Switzerland) Mathias Beche	4
(Switzerland) Rebellion Racing	Rebellion R-One	AER P60 2.0 L Turbo V6		D	13	(Austria) Dominik Kraihamer	All
(Switzerland) Rebellion Racing	Rebellion R-One	AER P60 2.0 L Turbo V6		D	13	(Switzerland) Alexandre Imperatori	All
(Switzerland) Rebellion Racing	Rebellion R-One	AER P60 2.0 L Turbo V6		D	13	(Switzerland) Mathéo Tuscher	All

=== LMP2 ===
Entrant/Team	Car	Engine	Tyre	No.	Drivers	Rounds
(Russia) G-Drive Racing	Oreca 05	Nissan VK45DE 4.5 L V8	D	26	(Russia) Roman Rusinov	All
(Russia) G-Drive Racing	Oreca 05	Nissan VK45DE 4.5 L V8	D	26	(Germany) René Rast	1–6, 9
(Russia) G-Drive Racing	Oreca 05	Nissan VK45DE 4.5 L V8	D	26	(France) Nathanaël Berthon	1–2
(Russia) G-Drive Racing	Oreca 05	Nissan VK45DE 4.5 L V8	D	26	(United Kingdom) Will Stevens	3, 7–8
(Russia) G-Drive Racing	Oreca 05	Nissan VK45DE 4.5 L V8	D	26	(United Kingdom) Alex Brundle	4–9
(Russia) G-Drive Racing	Gibson 015S	Nissan VK45DE 4.5 L V8	D	38†	(United Kingdom) Simon Dolan	2–3
(Russia) G-Drive Racing	Gibson 015S	Nissan VK45DE 4.5 L V8	D	38†	(United Kingdom) Jake Dennis	2–3
(Russia) G-Drive Racing	Gibson 015S	Nissan VK45DE 4.5 L V8	D	38†	(Netherlands) Giedo van der Garde	2–3
(Russia) SMP Racing	BR Engineering BR01	Nissan VK45DE 4.5 L V8	D	27	(Italy) Maurizio Mediani	All
(Russia) SMP Racing	BR Engineering BR01	Nissan VK45DE 4.5 L V8	D	27	(France) Nicolas Minassian	All
(Russia) SMP Racing	BR Engineering BR01	Nissan VK45DE 4.5 L V8	D	27	(Russia) David Markozov	2
(Russia) SMP Racing	BR Engineering BR01	Nissan VK45DE 4.5 L V8	D	27	(Russia) Mikhail Aleshin	3, 7–9
(Russia) SMP Racing	BR Engineering BR01	Nissan VK45DE 4.5 L V8	D	37	(Russia) Vitaly Petrov	All
(Russia) SMP Racing	BR Engineering BR01	Nissan VK45DE 4.5 L V8	D	37	(Russia) Viktor Shaytar	All
(Russia) SMP Racing	BR Engineering BR01	Nissan VK45DE 4.5 L V8	D	37	(Russia) Kirill Ladygin	All
(United States) Extreme Speed Motorsports	Ligier JS P2	Nissan VK45DE 4.5 L V8	D M	30	(United States) Scott Sharp	1–6
(United States) Extreme Speed Motorsports	Ligier JS P2	Nissan VK45DE 4.5 L V8	D M	30	(United States) Ed Brown	1–6
(United States) Extreme Speed Motorsports	Ligier JS P2	Nissan VK45DE 4.5 L V8	D M	30	(United States) Johannes van Overbeek	1–6
(United States) Extreme Speed Motorsports	Ligier JS P2	Nissan VK45DE 4.5 L V8	D M	30	(Indonesia) Sean Gelael	7–9
(United States) Extreme Speed Motorsports	Ligier JS P2	Nissan VK45DE 4.5 L V8	D M	30	(Italy) Antonio Giovinazzi	7–8
(United States) Extreme Speed Motorsports	Ligier JS P2	Nissan VK45DE 4.5 L V8	D M	30	(Netherlands) Giedo van der Garde	7, 9
(United States) Extreme Speed Motorsports	Ligier JS P2	Nissan VK45DE 4.5 L V8	D M	30	(United Kingdom) Tom Blomqvist	8
(United States) Extreme Speed Motorsports	Ligier JS P2	Nissan VK45DE 4.5 L V8	D M	30	(France) Tom Dillmann	9
(United States) Extreme Speed Motorsports	Ligier JS P2	Nissan VK45DE 4.5 L V8	D M	31	(Brazil) Pipo Derani	All
(United States) Extreme Speed Motorsports	Ligier JS P2	Nissan VK45DE 4.5 L V8	D M	31	(United Kingdom) Ryan Dalziel	All
(United States) Extreme Speed Motorsports	Ligier JS P2	Nissan VK45DE 4.5 L V8	D M	31	(Canada) Chris Cumming	All
(China) Baxi DC Racing Alpine	Alpine A460	Nissan VK45DE 4.5 L V8	D	35	(United States) David Cheng	All
(China) Baxi DC Racing Alpine	Alpine A460	Nissan VK45DE 4.5 L V8	D	35	(Netherlands) Ho-Pin Tung	All
(China) Baxi DC Racing Alpine	Alpine A460	Nissan VK45DE 4.5 L V8	D	35	(France) Nelson Panciatici	1–6
(China) Baxi DC Racing Alpine	Alpine A460	Nissan VK45DE 4.5 L V8	D	35	(France) Paul-Loup Chatin	7–9
(France) Signatech Alpine	Alpine A460	Nissan VK45DE 4.5 L V8	D	36	(United States) Gustavo Menezes	All
(France) Signatech Alpine	Alpine A460	Nissan VK45DE 4.5 L V8	D	36	(France) Nicolas Lapierre	All
(France) Signatech Alpine	Alpine A460	Nissan VK45DE 4.5 L V8	D	36	(Monaco) Stéphane Richelmi	All
(United Kingdom) Strakka Racing	Gibson 015S	Nissan VK45DE 4.5 L V8	D	42	(United Kingdom) Jonny Kane	1–7
(United Kingdom) Strakka Racing	Gibson 015S	Nissan VK45DE 4.5 L V8	D	42	(United Kingdom) Nick Leventis	1–6
(United Kingdom) Strakka Racing	Gibson 015S	Nissan VK45DE 4.5 L V8	D	42	(United Kingdom) Danny Watts	1–3
(United Kingdom) Strakka Racing	Gibson 015S	Nissan VK45DE 4.5 L V8	D	42	(United Kingdom) Lewis Williamson	4–7
(Mexico) RGR Sport by Morand	Ligier JS P2	Nissan VK45DE 4.5 L V8	D	43	(Portugal) Filipe Albuquerque	All
(Mexico) RGR Sport by Morand	Ligier JS P2	Nissan VK45DE 4.5 L V8	D	43	(Brazil) Bruno Senna	All
(Mexico) RGR Sport by Morand	Ligier JS P2	Nissan VK45DE 4.5 L V8	D	43	(Mexico) Ricardo González	All
(United Kingdom) Manor	Oreca 05	Nissan VK45DE 4.5 L V8	D	44	(Thailand) Tor Graves	1–4
(United Kingdom) Manor	Oreca 05	Nissan VK45DE 4.5 L V8	D	44	(United Kingdom) James Jakes	1–2
(United Kingdom) Manor	Oreca 05	Nissan VK45DE 4.5 L V8	D	44	(United Kingdom) Will Stevens	1–2
(United Kingdom) Manor	Oreca 05	Nissan VK45DE 4.5 L V8	D	44	(United Kingdom) Matt Rao	3, 5–9
(United Kingdom) Manor	Oreca 05	Nissan VK45DE 4.5 L V8	D	44	(Spain) Roberto Merhi	3, 6–7
(United Kingdom) Manor	Oreca 05	Nissan VK45DE 4.5 L V8	D	44	(Brazil) Antônio Pizzonia	4
(United Kingdom) Manor	Oreca 05	Nissan VK45DE 4.5 L V8	D	44	(United Kingdom) Matthew Howson	4
(United Kingdom) Manor	Oreca 05	Nissan VK45DE 4.5 L V8	D	44	(United Kingdom) Richard Bradley	5–9
(United Kingdom) Manor	Oreca 05	Nissan VK45DE 4.5 L V8	D	44	(Mexico) Alfonso Toledano Jr.	5
(United Kingdom) Manor	Oreca 05	Nissan VK45DE 4.5 L V8	D	44	(United Kingdom) Alex Lynn	8–9
(United Kingdom) Manor	Oreca 05	Nissan VK45DE 4.5 L V8	D	45†	(United Kingdom) Matt Rao	1–2, 4
(United Kingdom) Manor	Oreca 05	Nissan VK45DE 4.5 L V8	D	45†	(United Kingdom) Richard Bradley	1–2, 4
(United Kingdom) Manor	Oreca 05	Nissan VK45DE 4.5 L V8	D	45†	(Spain) Roberto Merhi	1–2, 4, 9
(United Kingdom) Manor	Oreca 05	Nissan VK45DE 4.5 L V8	D	45†	(Thailand) Tor Graves	7–8
(United Kingdom) Manor	Oreca 05	Nissan VK45DE 4.5 L V8	D	45†	(United Kingdom) Alex Lynn	7
(United Kingdom) Manor	Oreca 05	Nissan VK45DE 4.5 L V8	D	45†	(Japan) Shinji Nakano	7
(United Kingdom) Manor	Oreca 05	Nissan VK45DE 4.5 L V8	D	45†	(Mexico) Roberto González	8–9
(United Kingdom) Manor	Oreca 05	Nissan VK45DE 4.5 L V8	D	45†	(Switzerland) Mathias Beche	8
(United Kingdom) Manor	Oreca 05	Nissan VK45DE 4.5 L V8	D	45†	(France) Julien Canal	9

=== LMGTE Pro ===
Entrant/Team	Car	Engine	Tyre	No.	Drivers	Rounds
(Italy) AF Corse	Ferrari 488 GTE	Ferrari F154CB 4.0 L Turbo V8	M	51	(Italy) Gianmaria Bruni	All
(Italy) AF Corse	Ferrari 488 GTE	Ferrari F154CB 4.0 L Turbo V8	M	51	(United Kingdom) James Calado	All
(Italy) AF Corse	Ferrari 488 GTE	Ferrari F154CB 4.0 L Turbo V8	M	51	(Italy) Alessandro Pier Guidi	3
(Italy) AF Corse	Ferrari 488 GTE	Ferrari F154CB 4.0 L Turbo V8	M	71	(Italy) Davide Rigon	All
(Italy) AF Corse	Ferrari 488 GTE	Ferrari F154CB 4.0 L Turbo V8	M	71	(United Kingdom) Sam Bird	All
(Italy) AF Corse	Ferrari 488 GTE	Ferrari F154CB 4.0 L Turbo V8	M	71	(Italy) Andrea Bertolini	3
(United States) Ford Chip Ganassi Team UK	Ford GT	Ford EcoBoost D35 3.5 L Turbo V6	M	66	(France) Olivier Pla	All
(United States) Ford Chip Ganassi Team UK	Ford GT	Ford EcoBoost D35 3.5 L Turbo V6	M	66	(Germany) Stefan Mücke	All
(United States) Ford Chip Ganassi Team UK	Ford GT	Ford EcoBoost D35 3.5 L Turbo V6	M	66	(United States) Billy Johnson	1–3
(United States) Ford Chip Ganassi Team UK	Ford GT	Ford EcoBoost D35 3.5 L Turbo V6	M	67	(United Kingdom) Andy Priaulx	All
(United States) Ford Chip Ganassi Team UK	Ford GT	Ford EcoBoost D35 3.5 L Turbo V6	M	67	(United Kingdom) Harry Tincknell	All
(United States) Ford Chip Ganassi Team UK	Ford GT	Ford EcoBoost D35 3.5 L Turbo V6	M	67	(United Kingdom) Marino Franchitti	1–6
(Germany) Dempsey-Proton Racing	Porsche 911 RSR	Porsche M97/80 4.0 L Flat-6	M	77	(Austria) Richard Lietz	All
(Germany) Dempsey-Proton Racing	Porsche 911 RSR	Porsche M97/80 4.0 L Flat-6	M	77	(Denmark) Michael Christensen	All
(Germany) Dempsey-Proton Racing	Porsche 911 RSR	Porsche M97/80 4.0 L Flat-6	M	77	(Austria) Philipp Eng	3
(United Kingdom) Aston Martin Racing	Aston Martin Vantage GTE	Aston Martin AM05 4.5 L V8	D	95	(Denmark) Nicki Thiim	All
(United Kingdom) Aston Martin Racing	Aston Martin Vantage GTE	Aston Martin AM05 4.5 L V8	D	95	(Denmark) Marco Sørensen	All
(United Kingdom) Aston Martin Racing	Aston Martin Vantage GTE	Aston Martin AM05 4.5 L V8	D	95	(United Kingdom) Darren Turner	1–3
(United Kingdom) Aston Martin Racing	Aston Martin Vantage GTE	Aston Martin AM05 4.5 L V8	D	97	(New Zealand) Richie Stanaway	1–5, 7–8
(United Kingdom) Aston Martin Racing	Aston Martin Vantage GTE	Aston Martin AM05 4.5 L V8	D	97	(Brazil) Fernando Rees	1–3, 6
(United Kingdom) Aston Martin Racing	Aston Martin Vantage GTE	Aston Martin AM05 4.5 L V8	D	97	(United Kingdom) Jonathan Adam	2–3, 9
(United Kingdom) Aston Martin Racing	Aston Martin Vantage GTE	Aston Martin AM05 4.5 L V8	D	97	(United Kingdom) Darren Turner	4–9

=== LMGTE Am ===
Entrant/Team	Car	Engine	Tyre	No.	Drivers	Rounds
(France) Larbre Compétition	Chevrolet Corvette C7.R	Chevrolet LT5.5R 5.5 L V8	M	50	(France) Pierre Ragues	All
(France) Larbre Compétition	Chevrolet Corvette C7.R	Chevrolet LT5.5R 5.5 L V8	M	50	(Japan) Yutaka Yamagishi	1–5, 7
(France) Larbre Compétition	Chevrolet Corvette C7.R	Chevrolet LT5.5R 5.5 L V8	M	50	(Italy) Paolo Ruberti	1–2, 4
(France) Larbre Compétition	Chevrolet Corvette C7.R	Chevrolet LT5.5R 5.5 L V8	M	50	(France) Jean-Philippe Belloc	3
(France) Larbre Compétition	Chevrolet Corvette C7.R	Chevrolet LT5.5R 5.5 L V8	M	50	(United States) Ricky Taylor	5–9
(France) Larbre Compétition	Chevrolet Corvette C7.R	Chevrolet LT5.5R 5.5 L V8	M	50	(United Kingdom) Lars Viljoen	6
(France) Larbre Compétition	Chevrolet Corvette C7.R	Chevrolet LT5.5R 5.5 L V8	M	50	(France) Romain Brandela	8–9
(Hong Kong) KCMG	Porsche 911 RSR	Porsche M97/80 4.0 L Flat-6	M	78	(Germany) Christian Ried	All
(Hong Kong) KCMG	Porsche 911 RSR	Porsche M97/80 4.0 L Flat-6	M	78	(Germany) Wolf Henzler	All
(Hong Kong) KCMG	Porsche 911 RSR	Porsche M97/80 4.0 L Flat-6	M	78	(Switzerland) Joël Camathias	All
(Italy) AF Corse	Ferrari 458 Italia GT2	Ferrari F136 4.5 L V8	M	55†	(United Kingdom) Duncan Cameron	3
(Italy) AF Corse	Ferrari 458 Italia GT2	Ferrari F136 4.5 L V8	M	55†	(United Kingdom) Aaron Scott	3
(Italy) AF Corse	Ferrari 458 Italia GT2	Ferrari F136 4.5 L V8	M	55†	(Republic of Ireland) Matt Griffin	3
(Italy) AF Corse	Ferrari 458 Italia GT2	Ferrari F136 4.5 L V8	M	83	(France) François Perrodo	All
(Italy) AF Corse	Ferrari 458 Italia GT2	Ferrari F136 4.5 L V8	M	83	(France) Emmanuel Collard	All
(Italy) AF Corse	Ferrari 458 Italia GT2	Ferrari F136 4.5 L V8	M	83	(Portugal) Rui Águas	All
(United Kingdom) Gulf Racing	Porsche 911 RSR	Porsche M97/80 4.0 L Flat-6	M	86	(United Kingdom) Michael Wainwright	All
(United Kingdom) Gulf Racing	Porsche 911 RSR	Porsche M97/80 4.0 L Flat-6	M	86	(United Kingdom) Adam Carroll	All
(United Kingdom) Gulf Racing	Porsche 911 RSR	Porsche M97/80 4.0 L Flat-6	M	86	(United Kingdom) Ben Barker	All
(United Arab Emirates) Abu Dhabi-Proton Racing	Porsche 911 RSR	Porsche M97/80 4.0 L Flat-6	M	88	(United Arab Emirates) Khaled Al Qubaisi	All
(United Arab Emirates) Abu Dhabi-Proton Racing	Porsche 911 RSR	Porsche M97/80 4.0 L Flat-6	M	88	(Denmark) David Heinemeier Hansson	All
(United Arab Emirates) Abu Dhabi-Proton Racing	Porsche 911 RSR	Porsche M97/80 4.0 L Flat-6	M	88	(Austria) Klaus Bachler	1
(United Arab Emirates) Abu Dhabi-Proton Racing	Porsche 911 RSR	Porsche M97/80 4.0 L Flat-6	M	88	(United States) Patrick Long	2–5, 7–9
(United Arab Emirates) Abu Dhabi-Proton Racing	Porsche 911 RSR	Porsche M97/80 4.0 L Flat-6	M	88	(France) Kévin Estre	6
(United Kingdom) Aston Martin Racing	Aston Martin Vantage GTE	Aston Martin AM05 4.5 L V8	D M	98	(Canada) Paul Dalla Lana	All
(United Kingdom) Aston Martin Racing	Aston Martin Vantage GTE	Aston Martin AM05 4.5 L V8	D M	98	(Portugal) Pedro Lamy	All
(United Kingdom) Aston Martin Racing	Aston Martin Vantage GTE	Aston Martin AM05 4.5 L V8	D M	98	(Austria) Mathias Lauda	All
(United Kingdom) Aston Martin Racing	Aston Martin Vantage GTE	Aston Martin AM05 4.5 L V8	D M	99†	(United Kingdom) Andrew Howard	3
(United Kingdom) Aston Martin Racing	Aston Martin Vantage GTE	Aston Martin AM05 4.5 L V8	D M	99†	(United Kingdom) Liam Griffin	3
(United Kingdom) Aston Martin Racing	Aston Martin Vantage GTE	Aston Martin AM05 4.5 L V8	D M	99†	(Switzerland) Gary Hirsch	3

== Technical changes ==
The FIA have introduced a number of changes to the LMP1 cars for 2016 to reduce their speed. This is due to the 2015 cars being significantly faster than 2014 with most track records broken in 2015. The pace of development of the hybrid powertrains has resulted in cars racing with more than 1000 hp.

== Results and standings ==
=== Race results ===
The highest finishing competitor entered in the World Endurance Championship is listed below. Invitational entries may have finished ahead of WEC competitors in individual races.

Rnd.	Circuit	LMP1 Winners	LMP2 Winners	LMGTE Pro Winners	LMGTE Am Winners	Report
1	Silverstone	(Germany) No. 2 Porsche Team	(Mexico) No. 43 RGR Sport by Morand	(Italy) No. 71 AF Corse	(Italy) No. 83 AF Corse	Results
1	Silverstone	(Germany) Marc Lieb (Switzerland) Neel Jani (France) Romain Dumas	(Portugal) Filipe Albuquerque (Brazil) Bruno Senna (Mexico) Ricardo González	(Italy) Davide Rigon (United Kingdom) Sam Bird	(France) François Perrodo (France) Emmanuel Collard (Portugal) Rui Águas	Results
2	Spa-Francorchamps	(Germany) No. 8 Audi Sport Team Joest	(France) No. 36 Signatech Alpine	(Italy) No. 71 AF Corse	(United Kingdom) No. 98 Aston Martin Racing	Results
2	Spa-Francorchamps	(United Kingdom) Oliver Jarvis (Brazil) Lucas di Grassi (France) Loïc Duval	(United States) Gustavo Menezes (France) Nicolas Lapierre (Monaco) Stéphane Richelmi	(Italy) Davide Rigon (United Kingdom) Sam Bird	(Canada) Paul Dalla Lana (Portugal) Pedro Lamy (Austria) Mathias Lauda	Results
3	Le Mans	(Germany) No. 2 Porsche Team	(France) No. 36 Signatech Alpine	(United States) No. 66 Ford Chip Ganassi Team UK (Note: The LMGTE Pro class winner for Le Mans was the No. 68 Ford Chip Ganassi Team USA invitational entry. As it was not a full-season WEC entrant, the points for the win were awarded to the No. 66 Ford Chip Ganassi Team UK entry.)	(Italy) No. 83 AF Corse (Note: The LMGTE Am class winner for Le Mans was the No. 62 Scuderia Corsa invitational entry. As it was not a full-season WEC entrant, the points for the win were awarded to the No. 83 AF Corse entry.)	Results
3	Le Mans	(Germany) Marc Lieb (Switzerland) Neel Jani (France) Romain Dumas	(United States) Gustavo Menezes (France) Nicolas Lapierre (Monaco) Stéphane Richelmi	(Germany) Stefan Mücke (France) Olivier Pla (United States) Billy Johnson	(France) François Perrodo (France) Emmanuel Collard (Portugal) Rui Águas	Results
4	Nürburgring	(Germany) No. 1 Porsche Team	(France) No. 36 Signatech Alpine	(Italy) No. 51 AF Corse	(United Kingdom) No. 98 Aston Martin Racing	Results
4	Nürburgring	(Australia) Mark Webber (New Zealand) Brendon Hartley (Germany) Timo Bernhard	(United States) Gustavo Menezes (France) Nicolas Lapierre (Monaco) Stéphane Richelmi	(Italy) Gianmaria Bruni (United Kingdom) James Calado	(Canada) Paul Dalla Lana (Portugal) Pedro Lamy (Austria) Mathias Lauda	Results
5	Mexico City	(Germany) No. 1 Porsche Team	(Mexico) No. 43 RGR Sport by Morand	(United Kingdom) No. 97 Aston Martin Racing	(United Arab Emirates) No. 88 Abu Dhabi-Proton Racing	Results
5	Mexico City	(Australia) Mark Webber (New Zealand) Brendon Hartley (Germany) Timo Bernhard	(Portugal) Filipe Albuquerque (Brazil) Bruno Senna (Mexico) Ricardo González	(United Kingdom) Darren Turner (New Zealand) Richie Stanaway	(United Arab Emirates) Khaled Al Qubaisi (United States) Patrick Long (Denmark) David Heinemeier Hansson	Results
6	Austin	(Germany) No. 1 Porsche Team	(France) No. 36 Signatech Alpine	(United Kingdom) No. 95 Aston Martin Racing	(United Kingdom) No. 98 Aston Martin Racing	Results
6	Austin	(Australia) Mark Webber (New Zealand) Brendon Hartley (Germany) Timo Bernhard	(United States) Gustavo Menezes (France) Nicolas Lapierre (Monaco) Stéphane Richelmi	(Denmark) Nicki Thiim (Denmark) Marco Sørensen	(Canada) Paul Dalla Lana (Portugal) Pedro Lamy (Austria) Mathias Lauda	Results
7	Fuji	(Japan) No. 6 Toyota Gazoo Racing	(Russia) No. 26 G-Drive Racing	(United States) No. 67 Ford Chip Ganassi Team UK	(United Kingdom) No. 98 Aston Martin Racing	Results
7	Fuji	(France) Stéphane Sarrazin (United Kingdom) Mike Conway (Japan) Kamui Kobayashi	(Russia) Roman Rusinov (United Kingdom) Alex Brundle (United Kingdom) Will Stevens	(United Kingdom) Andy Priaulx (United Kingdom) Harry Tincknell	(Canada) Paul Dalla Lana (Portugal) Pedro Lamy (Austria) Mathias Lauda	Results
8	Shanghai	(Germany) No. 1 Porsche Team	(Russia) No. 26 G-Drive Racing	(United States) No. 67 Ford Chip Ganassi Team UK	(United Kingdom) No. 98 Aston Martin Racing	Results
8	Shanghai	(Australia) Mark Webber (New Zealand) Brendon Hartley (Germany) Timo Bernhard	(Russia) Roman Rusinov (United Kingdom) Alex Brundle (United Kingdom) Will Stevens	(United Kingdom) Andy Priaulx (United Kingdom) Harry Tincknell	(Canada) Paul Dalla Lana (Portugal) Pedro Lamy (Austria) Mathias Lauda	Results
9	Bahrain	(Germany) No. 8 Audi Sport Team Joest	(Russia) No. 26 G-Drive Racing	(United Kingdom) No. 95 Aston Martin Racing	(United Arab Emirates) No. 88 Abu Dhabi-Proton Racing	Results
9	Bahrain	(United Kingdom) Oliver Jarvis (Brazil) Lucas di Grassi (France) Loïc Duval	(Russia) Roman Rusinov (United Kingdom) Alex Brundle (Germany) René Rast	(Denmark) Nicki Thiim (Denmark) Marco Sørensen	(United Arab Emirates) Khaled Al Qubaisi (United States) Patrick Long (Denmark) David Heinemeier Hansson	Results

Entries were required to complete the timed race as well as to complete 70% of the overall winning car's race distance in order to earn championship points. A single bonus point was awarded to the team and all drivers of the pole position car for each category in qualifying. For the 24 Hours of Le Mans, the race result points allocation was doubled. Furthermore, a race must complete three laps under green flag conditions in order for championship points to be awarded.

=== Driver championships ===
Five titles were offered to drivers in the 2016 season. The World Championship was reserved for LMP1 and LMP2 drivers, while the World Cup for GT Drivers was available for drivers in the LMGTE categories. Further, three FIA Endurance Trophies were also awarded to drivers in the LMP2 and LMGTE Am categories, and privateers in the LMP1 category.

Points systems
Duration	1st	2nd	3rd	4th	5th	6th	7th	8th	9th	10th	Other	Pole
6 Hours	25	18	15	12	10	8	6	4	2	1	0.5	1
24 Hours	50	36	30	24	20	16	12	8	4	2	1	1

==== World Endurance Drivers' Championship ====
Pos.	Driver	Team	SIL (United Kingdom)	SPA (Belgium)	LMS (France)	NÜR (Germany)	MEX (Mexico)	COA (United States)	FUJ (Japan)	SHA (China)	BHR (Bahrain)	Total points
1	(Germany) Marc Lieb	(Germany) Porsche Team	1	2	**1**	4	4	4	5	4	6	160
1	(Switzerland) Neel Jani	(Germany) Porsche Team	1	2	**1**	4	4	4	5	4	6	160
1	(France) Romain Dumas	(Germany) Porsche Team	1	2	**1**	4	4	4	5	4	6	160
2	(United Kingdom) Oliver Jarvis	(Germany) Audi Sport Team Joest	Ret	1	3	2	**15**	2	**2**	5	**1**	147.5
2	(Brazil) Lucas di Grassi	(Germany) Audi Sport Team Joest	Ret	1	3	2	**15**	2	**2**	5	**1**	147.5
2	(France) Loïc Duval	(Germany) Audi Sport Team Joest	Ret	1	3	2	**15**	2	**2**	5	**1**	147.5
3	(United Kingdom) Mike Conway	(Japan) Toyota Gazoo Racing	2	Ret	2	6	3	3	1	2	5	145
3	(France) Stéphane Sarrazin	(Japan) Toyota Gazoo Racing	2	Ret	2	6	3	3	1	2	5	145
3	(Japan) Kamui Kobayashi	(Japan) Toyota Gazoo Racing	2	Ret	2	6	3	3	1	2	5	145
4	(Australia) Mark Webber	(Germany) Porsche Team	Ret	**16**	10	1	1	1	3	**1**	3	134.5
4	(New Zealand) Brendon Hartley	(Germany) Porsche Team	Ret	**16**	10	1	1	1	3	**1**	3	134.5
4	(Germany) Timo Bernhard	(Germany) Porsche Team	Ret	**16**	10	1	1	1	3	**1**	3	134.5
5	(Germany) André Lotterer	(Germany) Audi Sport Team Joest	**EX**	5	4	**3**	2	**6**	Ret	6	2	104
5	(Switzerland) Marcel Fässler	(Germany) Audi Sport Team Joest	**EX**	5	4	**3**	2	**6**	Ret	6	2	104
6	(France) Benoît Tréluyer	(Germany) Audi Sport Team Joest	**EX**	5	4		WD	**6**	Ret	6	2	70
7	(Austria) Dominik Kraihamer	(Switzerland) Rebellion Racing	3	3	Ret	7	5	7	6	17	7	66.5
7	(Switzerland) Alexandre Imperatori	(Switzerland) Rebellion Racing	3	3	Ret	7	5	7	6	17	7	66.5
7	(Switzerland) Mathéo Tuscher	(Switzerland) Rebellion Racing	3	3	Ret	7	5	7	6	17	7	66.5
8	(Switzerland) Sébastien Buemi	(Japan) Toyota Gazoo Racing	16	17	NC	5	Ret	5	4	3	4	60
8	(Japan) Kazuki Nakajima	(Japan) Toyota Gazoo Racing	16	17	NC	5	Ret	5	4	3	4	60
8	(United Kingdom) Anthony Davidson	(Japan) Toyota Gazoo Racing	16	17	NC	5		5	4	3	4	60
9	(United States) Gustavo Menezes	(France) Signatech Alpine	8	7	5	8	7	8	9	11	11	47
9	(France) Nicolas Lapierre	(France) Signatech Alpine	8	7	5	8	7	8	9	11	11	47
9	(Monaco) Stéphane Richelmi	(France) Signatech Alpine	8	7	5	8	7	8	9	11	11	47
10	(Russia) Roman Rusinov	(Russia) G-Drive Racing	7	11	6	Ret	12	10	7	8	9	36
11	(Portugal) Filipe Albuquerque	(Mexico) RGR Sport by Morand	5	10	11	9	6	9	8	10	10	30
11	(Brazil) Bruno Senna	(Mexico) RGR Sport by Morand	5	10	11	9	6	9	8	10	10	30
11	(Mexico) Ricardo González	(Mexico) RGR Sport by Morand	5	10	11	9	6	9	8	10	10	30
12	(United Kingdom) Will Stevens	(United Kingdom) Manor	Ret	14								26.5
12	(United Kingdom) Will Stevens	(Russia) G-Drive Racing			6				7	8		26.5
13	(Germany) René Rast	(Russia) G-Drive Racing	7	11	6	Ret	12	10			9	26
14	(Germany) Nick Heidfeld	(Switzerland) Rebellion Racing	4	4	13	17						25.5
14	(France) Nicolas Prost	(Switzerland) Rebellion Racing	4	4	13	17						25.5
15	(Brazil) Nelson Piquet Jr.	(Switzerland) Rebellion Racing	4	4	13							25
16	(Brazil) Pipo Derani	(United States) Extreme Speed Motorsports	6	8	14	10	8	13	11	12	12	20
16	(United Kingdom) Ryan Dalziel	(United States) Extreme Speed Motorsports	6	8	14	10	8	13	11	12	12	20
16	(Canada) Chris Cumming	(United States) Extreme Speed Motorsports	6	8	14	10	8	13	11	12	12	20
Pos.	Driver	Team	SIL (United Kingdom)	SPA (Belgium)	LMS (France)	NÜR (Germany)	MEX (Mexico)	COA (United States)	FUJ (Japan)	SHA (China)	BHR (Bahrain)	Total points

Colour	Result
Gold	Winner
Silver	Second place
Bronze	Third place
Green	Points classification
Blue	Non-points classification
Blue	Non-classified finish (NC)
Purple	Retired, not classified (Ret)
Red	Did not qualify (DNQ)
Red	Did not pre-qualify (DNPQ)
Black	Disqualified (DSQ)
White	Did not start (DNS)
White	Withdrew (WD)
White	Race cancelled (C)
Blank	Did not practice (DNP)
Blank	Did not arrive (DNA)
Blank	Excluded (EX)

**Bold** - Pole position

==== World Endurance Cup for GT Drivers ====
Pos.	Driver	Team	SIL (United Kingdom)	SPA (Belgium)	LMS (France)	NÜR (Germany)	MEX (Mexico)	COA (United States)	FUJ (Japan)	SHA (China)	BHR (Bahrain)	Total points
1	(Denmark) Nicki Thiim	(United Kingdom) Aston Martin Racing	3	Ret	2	**3**	**3**	**1**	5	4	1	156
1	(Denmark) Marco Sørensen	(United Kingdom) Aston Martin Racing	3	Ret	2	**3**	**3**	**1**	5	4	1	156
2	(Italy) Davide Rigon	(Italy) AF Corse	**1**	**1**	Ret	2	4	3	4	5	3	134
2	(United Kingdom) Sam Bird	(Italy) AF Corse	**1**	**1**	Ret	2	4	3	4	5	3	134
3	(Italy) Gianmaria Bruni	(Italy) AF Corse	2	Ret	**Ret**	1	2	2	3	3	2	128
3	(United Kingdom) James Calado	(Italy) AF Corse	2	Ret	**Ret**	1	2	2	3	3	2	128
4	(Germany) Stefan Mücke	(United States) Ford Chip Ganassi Team UK	5	Ret	1	4	11	13	**2**	2	6	118
4	(France) Olivier Pla	(United States) Ford Chip Ganassi Team UK	5	Ret	1	4	11	13	**2**	2	6	118
5	(United Kingdom) Andy Priaulx	(United States) Ford Chip Ganassi Team UK	4	2	10	12	5	4	1	**1**	4	117.5
5	(United Kingdom) Harry Tincknell	(United States) Ford Chip Ganassi Team UK	4	2	10	12	5	4	1	**1**	4	117.5
6	(United Kingdom) Darren Turner	(United Kingdom) Aston Martin Racing	3	Ret	2	5	1	5	6	Ret	**5**	115
7	(New Zealand) Richie Stanaway	(United Kingdom) Aston Martin Racing	Ret	3	3	5	1		6	Ret		88
8	(Denmark) Michael Christensen	(Germany) Dempsey-Proton Racing	9	4	6	6	6	6	7	6	7	74
8	(Austria) Richard Lietz	(Germany) Dempsey-Proton Racing	9	4	6	6	6	6	7	6	7	74
9	(United States) Billy Johnson	(United States) Ford Chip Ganassi Team UK	5	Ret	1							60
10	(United Kingdom) Jonathan Adam	(United Kingdom) Aston Martin Racing		3	3						**5**	56
11	(France) Emmanuel Collard	(Italy) AF Corse	6	6	4	8	8	12	9	8	10	55.5
11	(France) François Perrodo	(Italy) AF Corse	6	6	4	8	8	12	9	8	10	55.5
11	(Portugal) Rui Águas	(Italy) AF Corse	6	6	4	8	8	12	9	8	10	55.5
12	(Brazil) Fernando Rees	(United Kingdom) Aston Martin Racing	Ret	3	3			5				55
13	(United Kingdom) Marino Franchitti	(United States) Ford Chip Ganassi Team UK	4	2	10	12	5	4				54.5
14	(Austria) Mathias Lauda	(United Kingdom) Aston Martin Racing	7	5	Ret	7	Ret	7	8	7	Ret	38
14	(Portugal) Pedro Lamy	(United Kingdom) Aston Martin Racing	7	5	Ret	7	Ret	7	8	7	Ret	38
14	(Canada) Paul Dalla Lana	(United Kingdom) Aston Martin Racing	7	5	Ret	7	Ret	7	8	7	Ret	38
15	(United Arab Emirates) Khaled Al Qubaisi	(United Arab Emirates) Abu Dhabi-Proton Racing	11	10	5	10	7	11	12	10	8	34.5
15	(Denmark) David Heinemeier Hansson	(United Arab Emirates) Abu Dhabi-Proton Racing	11	10	5	10	7	11	12	10	8	34.5
16	(United States) Patrick Long	(United Arab Emirates) Abu Dhabi-Proton Racing		10	5	10	7		12	10	8	33.5
Pos.	Driver	Team	SIL (United Kingdom)	SPA (Belgium)	LMS (France)	NÜR (Germany)	MEX (Mexico)	COA (United States)	FUJ (Japan)	SHA (China)	BHR (Bahrain)	Total points

==== FIA Endurance Trophy for LMP1 Private Team Drivers ====
Pos.	Driver	Team	SIL (United Kingdom)	SPA (Belgium)	LMS (France)	NÜR (Germany)	MEX (Mexico)	COA (United States)	FUJ (Japan)	SHA (China)	BHR (Bahrain)	Total points
1	(Austria) Dominik Kraihamer	(Switzerland) Rebellion Racing	1	1	Ret	1	1	1	1	2	1	193
1	(Switzerland) Alexandre Imperatori	(Switzerland) Rebellion Racing	1	1	Ret	1	1	1	1	2	1	193
1	(Switzerland) Mathéo Tuscher	(Switzerland) Rebellion Racing	1	1	Ret	1	1	1	1	2	1	193
2	(United Kingdom) Oliver Webb	(Austria) ByKolles Racing Team	3	3	Ret	Ret	2	2	Ret	1	2	109
2	(Switzerland) Simon Trummer	(Austria) ByKolles Racing Team	3	3	Ret	Ret	2	2	Ret	1	2	109
3	(Germany) Nick Heidfeld	(Switzerland) Rebellion Racing	2	2	1	2						104
3	(France) Nicolas Prost	(Switzerland) Rebellion Racing	2	2	1	2						104
4	(Brazil) Nelson Piquet Jr.	(Switzerland) Rebellion Racing	2	2	1							86
5	(Germany) Pierre Kaffer	(Austria) ByKolles Racing Team			Ret	Ret	2		Ret	1	2	61
6	(United Kingdom) James Rossiter	(Austria) ByKolles Racing Team	3	3								30
7	(Switzerland) Mathias Beche	(Switzerland) Rebellion Racing				2						18

==== FIA Endurance Trophy for LMP2 Drivers ====
Pos.	Driver	Team	SIL (United Kingdom)	SPA (Belgium)	LMS (France)	NÜR (Germany)	MEX (Mexico)	COA (United States)	FUJ (Japan)	SHA (China)	BHR (Bahrain)	Total points
1	(United States) Gustavo Menezes	(France) Signatech Alpine	4	1	1	1	2	**1**	3	4	**3**	199
1	(France) Nicolas Lapierre	(France) Signatech Alpine	4	1	1	1	2	**1**	3	4	**3**	199
1	(Monaco) Stéphane Richelmi	(France) Signatech Alpine	4	1	1	1	2	**1**	3	4	**3**	199
2	(Portugal) Filipe Albuquerque	(Mexico) RGR Sport by Morand	1	4	6	2	**1**	2	2	3	2	166
2	(Brazil) Bruno Senna	(Mexico) RGR Sport by Morand	1	4	6	2	**1**	2	2	3	2	166
2	(Mexico) Ricardo González	(Mexico) RGR Sport by Morand	1	4	6	2	**1**	2	2	3	2	166
3	(Russia) Roman Rusinov	(Russia) G-Drive Racing	**3**	**5**	**2**	**Ret**	7	3	**1**	1	1	162
4	(Brazil) Pipo Derani	(United States) Extreme Speed Motorsports	2	2	8	3	3	5	5	5	4	116
4	(United Kingdom) Ryan Dalziel	(United States) Extreme Speed Motorsports	2	2	8	3	3	5	5	5	4	116
4	(Canada) Chris Cumming	(United States) Extreme Speed Motorsports	2	2	8	3	3	5	5	5	4	116
5	(Germany) René Rast	(Russia) G-Drive Racing	**3**	**5**	**2**	**Ret**	7	3			1	111
6	(United Kingdom) Alex Brundle	(Russia) G-Drive Racing				**Ret**	7	3	**1**	1	1	98
7	(United Kingdom) Will Stevens	(United Kingdom) Manor	Ret	8								92
7	(United Kingdom) Will Stevens	(Russia) G-Drive Racing			**2**				**1**	1		92
8	(United Kingdom) Jonny Kane	(United Kingdom) Strakka Racing	5	Ret	4	4	4	Ret	6			66
9	(Russia) Kirill Ladygin	(Russia) SMP Racing	8	9	3	6	Ret	6	10	7	8	63
9	(Russia) Vitaly Petrov	(Russia) SMP Racing	8	9	3	6	Ret	6	10	7	8	63
9	(Russia) Viktor Shaytar	(Russia) SMP Racing	8	9	3	6	Ret	6	10	7	8	63
10	(Italy) Maurizio Mediani	(Russia) SMP Racing	10	Ret	5	8	7	4	8	6	9	59
10	(France) Nicolas Minassian	(Russia) SMP Racing	10	Ret	5	8	7	4	8	6	9	59
11	(United Kingdom) Nick Leventis	(United Kingdom) Strakka Racing	5	Ret	4	4	4	Ret				58
12	(Indonesia) Sean Gelael	(United States) Extreme Speed Motorsports							4	2	5	40
13	(United States) David Cheng	(China) Baxi DC Racing Alpine	7	Ret	Ret	7	5	8	9	8	6	40
13	(Netherlands) Ho-Pin Tung	(China) Baxi DC Racing Alpine	7	Ret	Ret	7	5	8	9	8	6	40
14	(Spain) Roberto Merhi	(United Kingdom) Manor	6	3	Ret	Ret		Ret	7		7	35
15	(United Kingdom) Danny Watts	(United Kingdom) Strakka Racing	5	Ret	4							34

==== FIA Endurance Trophy for LMGTE Am Drivers ====
Pos.	Driver	Team	SIL (United Kingdom)	SPA (Belgium)	LMS (France)	NÜR (Germany)	MEX (Mexico)	COA (United States)	FUJ (Japan)	SHA (China)	BHR (Bahrain)	Total points
1	(France) Emmanuel Collard	(Italy) AF Corse	1	2	1	2	2	6	2	2	3	188
1	(France) François Perrodo	(Italy) AF Corse	1	2	1	2	2	6	2	2	3	188
1	(Portugal) Rui Águas	(Italy) AF Corse	1	2	1	2	2	6	2	2	3	188
2	(United Arab Emirates) Khaled Al Qubaisi	(United Arab Emirates) Abu Dhabi-Proton Racing	**5**	6	2	**4**	**1**	5	5	4	1	151
2	(Denmark) David Heinemeier Hansson	(United Arab Emirates) Abu Dhabi-Proton Racing	**5**	6	2	**4**	**1**	5	5	4	1	151
3	(Austria) Mathias Lauda	(United Kingdom) Aston Martin Racing	2	**1**	**Ret**	1	Ret	**1**	**1**	**1**	**Ret**	149
3	(Portugal) Pedro Lamy	(United Kingdom) Aston Martin Racing	2	**1**	**Ret**	1	Ret	**1**	**1**	**1**	**Ret**	149
3	(Canada) Paul Dalla Lana	(United Kingdom) Aston Martin Racing	2	**1**	**Ret**	1	Ret	**1**	**1**	**1**	**Ret**	149
4	(United States) Patrick Long	(United Arab Emirates) Abu Dhabi-Proton Racing		6	2	**4**	**1**		5	4	1	130
5	(Germany) Christian Ried	(Hong Kong) KCMG	4	4	6	EX	3	2	3	3	2	121
5	(Germany) Wolf Henzler	(Hong Kong) KCMG	4	4	6	EX	3	2	3	3	2	121
5	(Switzerland) Joël Camathias	(Hong Kong) KCMG	4	4	6	EX	3	2	3	3	2	121
6	(France) Pierre Ragues	(France) Larbre Compétition	3	3	5	3	Ret	3	6	5	5	108
7	(United Kingdom) Michael Wainwright	(United Kingdom) Gulf Racing	Ret	5	3	5	4	4	4	6	4	106
7	(United Kingdom) Adam Carroll	(United Kingdom) Gulf Racing	Ret	5	3	5	4	4	4	6	4	106
7	(United Kingdom) Ben Barker	(United Kingdom) Gulf Racing	Ret	5	3	5	4	4	4	6	4	106
8	(Japan) Yutaka Yamagishi	(France) Larbre Compétition	3	3	5	3	Ret		6			73

=== Manufacturer championships ===
Two manufacturers' titles were contested, one for LMPs and one for LMGTEs. The World Endurance Championship for Manufacturers was only open to manufacturer entries in the LMP1 category, while the World Endurance Cup for GT Manufacturers allowed all entries from registered manufacturers in LMGTE Pro and LMGTE Am to participate. The top two finishing cars from each manufacturer earned points toward their total.

==== World Endurance Manufacturers' Championship ====
Pos.	Manufacturer	SIL (United Kingdom)	SPA (Belgium)	LMS (France)	NÜR (Germany)	MEX (Mexico)	COA (United States)	FUJ (Japan)	SHA (China)	BHR (Bahrain)	Total points
1	(Germany) Porsche	1	2	**1**	1	1	1	3	1	3	324
1	(Germany) Porsche	Ret	**4**	5	4	4	4	5	**4**	6	324
2	(Germany) Audi	Ret	1	3	2	2	2	**2**	5	**1**	266
2	(Germany) Audi	**EX**	3	4	**3**	**5**	**6**	Ret	6	2	266
3	(Japan) Toyota	2	5	2	5	3	3	1	2	4	229
3	(Japan) Toyota	3	Ret	NC	6	Ret	5	4	3	5	229

==== World Endurance Cup for GT Manufacturers ====
Pos.	Manufacturer	SIL (United Kingdom)	SPA (Belgium)	LMS (France)	NÜR (Germany)	MEX (Mexico)	COA (United States)	FUJ (Japan)	SHA (China)	BHR (Bahrain)	Total points
1	(Italy) Ferrari	**1**	**1**	4	1	2	2	3	3	2	294
1	(Italy) Ferrari	2	6	**Ret**	2	4	3	4	5	3	294
2	(United Kingdom) Aston Martin	3	3	2	**3**	1	**1**	5	4	1	287
2	(United Kingdom) Aston Martin	7	5	3	5	**3**	5	6	7	**5**	287
3	(United States) Ford	4	2	1	4	5	4	1	**1**	4	241.5
3	(United States) Ford	5	Ret	8	11	11	12	**2**	2	6	241.5
4	(Germany) Porsche	8	4	5	6	6	6	7	6	7	123
4	(Germany) Porsche	9	7	6	9	7	8	10	9	8	123

=== Team championships ===
All categories awarded a team trophy for each individual entry, although LMP1 was limited to entries not from a manufacturer.

==== FIA Endurance Trophy for Private LMP1 Teams ====
Pos.	Car	Team	SIL (United Kingdom)	SPA (Belgium)	LMS (France)	NÜR (Germany)	MEX (Mexico)	COA (United States)	FUJ (Japan)	SHA (China)	BHR (Bahrain)	Total points
1	13	(Switzerland) Rebellion Racing	1	1	Ret	1	1	1	1	2	1	193
2	4	(Austria) ByKolles Racing Team	3	3	Ret	Ret	2	2	Ret	1	2	109
3	12	(Switzerland) Rebellion Racing	2	2	1	2						104

==== FIA Endurance Trophy for LMP2 Teams ====
Pos.	Car	Team	SIL (United Kingdom)	SPA (Belgium)	LMS (France)	NÜR (Germany)	MEX (Mexico)	COA (United States)	FUJ (Japan)	SHA (China)	BHR (Bahrain)	Total points
1	36	(France) Signatech Alpine	4	1	1	1	2	**1**	3	4	**3**	199
2	43	(Mexico) RGR Sport by Morand	1	3	6	2	**1**	2	2	3	2	169
3	26	(Russia) G-Drive Racing	**3**	**4**	**2**	**Ret**	7	3	**1**	1	1	164
4	31	(United States) Extreme Speed Motorsports	2	2	8	3	3	5	5	5	4	116
5	30	(United States) Extreme Speed Motorsports	8	5	7	9	8	7	4	2	5	78
6	37	(Russia) SMP Racing	7	7	3	6	Ret	6	10	7	7	71
7	42	(United Kingdom) Strakka Racing	5	Ret	4	4	4	Ret	6			66
8	27	(Russia) SMP Racing	9	Ret	5	8	6	4	8	6	8	62
9	35	(China) Baxi DC Racing Alpine	6	Ret	Ret	7	5	8	9	8	6	42
10	44	(United Kingdom) Manor	Ret	6	Ret	5	Ret	Ret	7	**9**	9	29

==== FIA Endurance Trophy for LMGTE Pro Teams ====
Pos.	Car	Team	SIL (United Kingdom)	SPA (Belgium)	LMS (France)	NÜR (Germany)	MEX (Mexico)	COA (United States)	FUJ (Japan)	SHA (China)	BHR (Bahrain)	Total points
1	95	(United Kingdom) Aston Martin Racing	3	Ret	2	**3**	**3**	**1**	5	4	1	156
2	67	(United States) Ford Chip Ganassi Team UK	4	2	5	7	5	4	1	**1**	4	141
3	71	(Italy) AF Corse	**1**	**1**	Ret	2	4	3	4	5	3	134
4	66	(United States) Ford Chip Ganassi Team UK	5	Ret	1	4	7	7	**2**	2	6	129
5	51	(Italy) AF Corse	2	Ret	**Ret**	1	2	2	3	3	2	128
6	97	(United Kingdom) Aston Martin Racing	Ret	3	3	5	1	5	6	Ret	**5**	109
7	77	(Germany) Dempsey-Proton Racing	6	4	4	6	6	6	7	6	7	88

==== FIA Endurance Trophy for LMGTE Am Teams ====
Pos.	Car	Team	SIL (United Kingdom)	SPA (Belgium)	LMS (France)	NÜR (Germany)	MEX (Mexico)	COA (United States)	FUJ (Japan)	SHA (China)	BHR (Bahrain)	Total points
1	83	(Italy) AF Corse	1	2	1	2	2	6	2	2	3	188
2	88	(United Arab Emirates) Abu Dhabi-Proton Racing	**5**	6	2	**4**	**1**	5	5	4	1	151
3	98	(United Kingdom) Aston Martin Racing	2	**1**	**Ret**	1	Ret	**1**	**1**	**1**	**Ret**	149
4	78	(Hong Kong) KCMG	4	4	5	EX	3	2	3	3	2	125
5	50	(France) Larbre Compétition	3	3	4	3	Ret	3	6	5	5	112
6	86	(United Kingdom) Gulf Racing	Ret	5	3	5	4	4	4	6	4	106
