= 2016 6 Hours of Mexico =

Sports car endurance racing event

Track layout of the Autódromo Hermanos Rodríguez

The 2016 WEC 6 Hours of Mexico was an endurance sports car racing event held at the Autódromo Hermanos Rodríguez, Mexico on 1–3 September 2016. The Autódromo Hermanos Rodríguez round served as the fifth race of the 2016 FIA World Endurance Championship. The race was won by the No. 1 Porsche entered by Porsche Motorsport.

== Qualifying ==
=== Qualifying result ===
Pole position winners in each class are marked in bold.

Pos	Class	Team	Average Time	Grid
1	**LMP1**	**No. 8 Audi Sport Team Joest**	**1:25.069**	**1**
2	LMP1	No. 2 Porsche Team	1:25.111	2
3	LMP1	No. 7 Audi Sport Team Joest	1:25.350	3
4	LMP1	No. 1 Porsche Team	1:25.400	4
5	LMP1	No. 5 Toyota Gazoo Racing	1:25.960	5
6	LMP1	No. 6 Toyota Gazoo Racing	1:27.334	6
7	LMP1	No. 13 Rebellion Racing	1:29.909	7
8	LMP1	No. 4 ByKolles Racing	1:31.674	8
9	**LMP2**	**No. 43 RGR Sport by Morand**	**1:35.485**	**9**
10	LMP2	No. 36 Signatech Alpine	1:35.819	10
11	LMP2	No. 42 Strakka Racing	1:36.037	11
12	LMP2	No. 26 G-Drive Racing	1:36.063	12
13	LMP2	No. 44 Manor	1:36.594	13
14	LMP2	No. 41 Greaves Motorsport	1:36.914	14
15	LMP2	No. 27 SMP Racing	1:37.102	15
16	LMP2	No. 37 SMP Racing	1:37.112	16
17	LMP2	No. 35 Baxi DC Racing Alpine	1:37.482	17
18	LMP2	No. 31 Extreme Speed Motorsports	1:37.752	18
19	LMP2	No. 30 Extreme Speed Motorsports	1:39.514	19
20	**LMGTE-Pro**	**No. 95 Aston Martin Racing**	**1:40.458**	**20**
21	LMGTE-Pro	No. 97 Aston Martin Racing	1:40.600	21
22	LMGTE-Pro	No. 51 AF Corse	1:41.034	22
23	LMGTE-Pro	No. 77 Dempsey-Proton Racing	1:41.383	23
24	LMGTE-Pro	No. 71 AF Corse	1:41.426	24
25	LMGTE-Pro	No. 66 Ford Chip Ganassi Team UK	1:41.523	25
26	LMGTE-Pro	No. 67 Ford Chip Ganassi Team UK	1:41.836	26
27	**LMGTE-Am**	**No. 88 Abu Dhabi-Proton Racing**	**1:42.839**	**27**
28	LMGTE-Am	No. 86 Gulf Racing	1:43.546	28
29	LMGTE-Am	No. 78 KCMG	1:43.722	29
30	LMGTE-Am	No. 50 Larbre Compétition	1:43.738	30
31	LMGTE-Am	No. 83 AF Corse	1:43.880	31
EX	LMGTE-Am	No. 98 Aston Martin Racing	1:42.437^{1}	32

^1 – No. 98 Aston Martin Racing was excluded from qualifying as the ride car's height was 55mm lower.

== Race ==
=== Race result ===
The minimum number of laps for classification (70% of the overall winning car's race distance) was 161 laps. Class winners are denoted in bold.

Pos	Class	No	Team	Drivers	Chassis	Tyre	Laps
Pos	Class	No	Team	Drivers	Engine	Tyre	Laps
1	**LMP1**	**1**	**(Germany) Porsche Team**	**(Germany) Timo Bernhard (New Zealand) Brendon Hartley (Australia) Mark Webber**	**Porsche 919 Hybrid**	MI	**230**
1	**LMP1**	**1**	**(Germany) Porsche Team**	**(Germany) Timo Bernhard (New Zealand) Brendon Hartley (Australia) Mark Webber**	**Porsche 2.0 L Turbo V4**	MI	**230**
2	LMP1	7	(Germany) Audi Sport Team Joest	(Germany) André Lotterer (Switzerland) Marcel Fässler	Audi R18	MI	230
2	LMP1	7	(Germany) Audi Sport Team Joest	(Germany) André Lotterer (Switzerland) Marcel Fässler	Audi TDI 4.0 L Turbo Diesel V6	MI	230
3	LMP1	6	(Japan) Toyota Gazoo Racing	(France) Stéphane Sarrazin (United Kingdom) Mike Conway (Japan) Kamui Kobayashi	Toyota TS050 Hybrid	MI	230
3	LMP1	6	(Japan) Toyota Gazoo Racing	(France) Stéphane Sarrazin (United Kingdom) Mike Conway (Japan) Kamui Kobayashi	Toyota 2.4 L Turbo V6	MI	230
4	LMP1	2	(Germany) Porsche Team	(Germany) Marc Lieb (France) Romain Dumas (Switzerland) Neel Jani	Porsche 919 Hybrid	MI	230
4	LMP1	2	(Germany) Porsche Team	(Germany) Marc Lieb (France) Romain Dumas (Switzerland) Neel Jani	Porsche 2.0 L Turbo V4	MI	230
5	LMP1	13	(Switzerland) Rebellion Racing	(Austria) Dominik Kraihamer (Switzerland) Alexandre Imperatori (Switzerland) Mathéo Tuscher	Rebellion R-One	D	218
5	LMP1	13	(Switzerland) Rebellion Racing	(Austria) Dominik Kraihamer (Switzerland) Alexandre Imperatori (Switzerland) Mathéo Tuscher	AER P60 2.4 L Turbo V6	D	218
6	**LMP2**	**43**	**(Mexico) RGR Sport by Morand**	**(Mexico) Ricardo González (Portugal) Filipe Albuquerque (Brazil) Bruno Senna**	**Ligier JS P2**	D	**210**
6	**LMP2**	**43**	**(Mexico) RGR Sport by Morand**	**(Mexico) Ricardo González (Portugal) Filipe Albuquerque (Brazil) Bruno Senna**	**Nissan VK45DE 4.5 L V8**	D	**210**
7	LMP2	36	(France) Signatech Alpine	(France) Nicolas Lapierre (United States) Gustavo Menezes (Monaco) Stéphane Richelmi	Alpine A460	D	210
7	LMP2	36	(France) Signatech Alpine	(France) Nicolas Lapierre (United States) Gustavo Menezes (Monaco) Stéphane Richelmi	Nissan VK45DE 4.5 L V8	D	210
8	LMP2	31	(United States) Extreme Speed Motorsports	(United Kingdom) Ryan Dalziel (Canada) Chris Cumming (Brazil) Pipo Derani	Ligier JS P2	MI	207
8	LMP2	31	(United States) Extreme Speed Motorsports	(United Kingdom) Ryan Dalziel (Canada) Chris Cumming (Brazil) Pipo Derani	Nissan VK45DE 4.5 L V8	MI	207
9	LMP2	42	(United Kingdom) Strakka Racing	(United Kingdom) Nick Leventis (United Kingdom) Jonny Kane (United Kingdom) Lewis Williamson	Gibson 015S	D	207
9	LMP2	42	(United Kingdom) Strakka Racing	(United Kingdom) Nick Leventis (United Kingdom) Jonny Kane (United Kingdom) Lewis Williamson	Nissan VK45DE 4.5 L V8	D	207
10	LMP2	41	(United Kingdom) Greaves Motorsport	(Mexico) Roberto González (Mexico) Luis Díaz (Brazil) Bruno Junqueira	Gibson 015S	D	207
10	LMP2	41	(United Kingdom) Greaves Motorsport	(Mexico) Roberto González (Mexico) Luis Díaz (Brazil) Bruno Junqueira	Nissan VK45DE 4.5 L V8	D	207
11	LMP2	35	(China) Baxi DC Racing Alpine	(United States) David Cheng (China) Ho-Pin Tung (France) Nelson Panciatici	Alpine A460	D	206
11	LMP2	35	(China) Baxi DC Racing Alpine	(United States) David Cheng (China) Ho-Pin Tung (France) Nelson Panciatici	Nissan VK45DE 4.5 L V8	D	206
12	LMP2	27	(Russia) SMP Racing	(France) Nicolas Minassian (Italy) Maurizio Mediani	BR Engineering BR01	D	206
12	LMP2	27	(Russia) SMP Racing	(France) Nicolas Minassian (Italy) Maurizio Mediani	Nissan VK45DE 4.5 L V8	D	206
13	LMP2	26	(Russia) G-Drive Racing	(Russia) Roman Rusinov (United Kingdom) Alex Brundle (Germany) René Rast	Oreca 05	D	205
13	LMP2	26	(Russia) G-Drive Racing	(Russia) Roman Rusinov (United Kingdom) Alex Brundle (Germany) René Rast	Nissan VK45DE 4.5 L V8	D	205
14	LMP2	30	(United States) Extreme Speed Motorsports	(United States) Scott Sharp (United States) Ed Brown (United States) Johannes van Overbeek	Ligier JS P2	MI	204
14	LMP2	30	(United States) Extreme Speed Motorsports	(United States) Scott Sharp (United States) Ed Brown (United States) Johannes van Overbeek	Nissan VK45DE 4.5 L V8	MI	204
15	**LMGTE; Pro**	**97**	**(United Kingdom) Aston Martin Racing**	**(United Kingdom) Darren Turner (New Zealand) Richie Stanaway**	**Aston Martin V8 Vantage GTE**	D	**202**
15	**LMGTE; Pro**	**97**	**(United Kingdom) Aston Martin Racing**	**(United Kingdom) Darren Turner (New Zealand) Richie Stanaway**	**Aston Martin 4.5 L V8**	D	**202**
16	LMGTE; Pro	51	(Italy) AF Corse	(Italy) Gianmaria Bruni (United Kingdom) James Calado	Ferrari 488 GTE	MI	202
16	LMGTE; Pro	51	(Italy) AF Corse	(Italy) Gianmaria Bruni (United Kingdom) James Calado	Ferrari F154CB 3.9 L Turbo V8	MI	202
17	LMGTE; Pro	95	(United Kingdom) Aston Martin Racing	(Denmark) Nicki Thiim (Denmark) Marco Sørensen	Aston Martin V8 Vantage GTE	D	202
17	LMGTE; Pro	95	(United Kingdom) Aston Martin Racing	(Denmark) Nicki Thiim (Denmark) Marco Sørensen	Aston Martin 4.5 L V8	D	202
18	LMGTE; Pro	71	(Italy) AF Corse	(Italy) Davide Rigon (United Kingdom) Sam Bird	Ferrari 488 GTE	MI	201
18	LMGTE; Pro	71	(Italy) AF Corse	(Italy) Davide Rigon (United Kingdom) Sam Bird	Ferrari F154CB 3.9 L Turbo V8	MI	201
19	LMGTE; Pro	67	(United States) Ford Chip Ganassi Team UK	(United Kingdom) Andy Priaulx (United Kingdom) Marino Franchitti (United Kingdom) Harry Tincknell	Ford GT	MI	201
19	LMGTE; Pro	67	(United States) Ford Chip Ganassi Team UK	(United Kingdom) Andy Priaulx (United Kingdom) Marino Franchitti (United Kingdom) Harry Tincknell	Ford EcoBoost 3.5 L Turbo V6	MI	201
20	LMGTE; Pro	77	(Germany) Dempsey-Proton Racing	(Austria) Richard Lietz (Denmark) Michael Christensen	Porsche 911 RSR	MI	201
20	LMGTE; Pro	77	(Germany) Dempsey-Proton Racing	(Austria) Richard Lietz (Denmark) Michael Christensen	Porsche 4.0 L Flat-6	MI	201
21	LMP1	4	(Austria) ByKolles Racing Team	(Switzerland) Simon Trummer (Germany) Pierre Kaffer (United Kingdom) Oliver Webb	CLM P1/01	D	199
21	LMP1	4	(Austria) ByKolles Racing Team	(Switzerland) Simon Trummer (Germany) Pierre Kaffer (United Kingdom) Oliver Webb	AER P60 2.4 L Turbo V6	D	199
22	**LMGTE; Am**	**88**	**(United Arab Emirates) Abu Dhabi-Proton Racing**	**(United Arab Emirates) Khaled Al Qubaisi (United States) Patrick Long (Denmark) David Heinemeier Hansson**	**Porsche 911 RSR**	MI	**197**
22	**LMGTE; Am**	**88**	**(United Arab Emirates) Abu Dhabi-Proton Racing**	**(United Arab Emirates) Khaled Al Qubaisi (United States) Patrick Long (Denmark) David Heinemeier Hansson**	**Porsche 4.0 L Flat-6**	MI	**197**
23	LMGTE; Am	83	(Italy) AF Corse	(France) François Perrodo (France) Emmanuel Collard (Portugal) Rui Águas	Ferrari 458 Italia GT2	MI	196
23	LMGTE; Am	83	(Italy) AF Corse	(France) François Perrodo (France) Emmanuel Collard (Portugal) Rui Águas	Ferrari 4.5 L V8	MI	196
24	LMGTE; Am	78	(Hong Kong) KCMG	(Germany) Christian Ried (Germany) Wolf Henzler (Switzerland) Joël Camathias	Porsche 911 RSR	MI	196
24	LMGTE; Am	78	(Hong Kong) KCMG	(Germany) Christian Ried (Germany) Wolf Henzler (Switzerland) Joël Camathias	Porsche 4.0 L Flat-6	MI	196
25	LMGTE; Am	86	(United Kingdom) Gulf Racing	(United Kingdom) Michael Wainwright (United Kingdom) Adam Carroll (United Kingdom) Ben Barker	Porsche 911 RSR	MI	196
25	LMGTE; Am	86	(United Kingdom) Gulf Racing	(United Kingdom) Michael Wainwright (United Kingdom) Adam Carroll (United Kingdom) Ben Barker	Porsche 4.0 L Flat-6	MI	196
26	LMGTE; Pro	66	(United States) Ford Chip Ganassi Team UK	(France) Olivier Pla (Germany) Stefan Mücke	Ford GT	MI	181
26	LMGTE; Pro	66	(United States) Ford Chip Ganassi Team UK	(France) Olivier Pla (Germany) Stefan Mücke	Ford EcoBoost 3.5 L Turbo V6	MI	181
27	LMP1	8	(Germany) Audi Sport Team Joest	(France) Loïc Duval (Brazil) Lucas di Grassi (United Kingdom) Oliver Jarvis	Audi R18	MI	167
27	LMP1	8	(Germany) Audi Sport Team Joest	(France) Loïc Duval (Brazil) Lucas di Grassi (United Kingdom) Oliver Jarvis	Audi TDI 4.0 L Turbo Diesel V6	MI	167
DNF	LMGTE; Am	98	(United Kingdom) Aston Martin Racing	(Canada) Paul Dalla Lana (Portugal) Pedro Lamy (Austria) Mathias Lauda	Aston Martin V8 Vantage GTE	MI	192
DNF	LMGTE; Am	98	(United Kingdom) Aston Martin Racing	(Canada) Paul Dalla Lana (Portugal) Pedro Lamy (Austria) Mathias Lauda	Aston Martin 4.5 L V8	MI	192
DNF	LMGTE; Am	50	(France) Larbre Compétition	(Japan) Yutaka Yamagishi (France) Pierre Ragues (United States) Ricky Taylor	Chevrolet Corvette C7.R	MI	184
DNF	LMGTE; Am	50	(France) Larbre Compétition	(Japan) Yutaka Yamagishi (France) Pierre Ragues (United States) Ricky Taylor	Chevrolet LT5.5 5.5 L V8	MI	184
DNF	LMP2	44	(United Kingdom) Manor	(United Kingdom) Matt Rao (United Kingdom) Richard Bradley (Mexico) Alfonso Diaz Guerra	Oreca 05	D	179
DNF	LMP2	44	(United Kingdom) Manor	(United Kingdom) Matt Rao (United Kingdom) Richard Bradley (Mexico) Alfonso Diaz Guerra	Nissan VK45DE 4.5 L V8	D	179
DNF	LMP1	5	(Japan) Toyota Gazoo Racing	(Switzerland) Sébastien Buemi (Japan) Kazuki Nakajima	Toyota TS050 Hybrid	MI	62
DNF	LMP1	5	(Japan) Toyota Gazoo Racing	(Switzerland) Sébastien Buemi (Japan) Kazuki Nakajima	Toyota 2.4 L Turbo V6	MI	62
DNF	LMP2	37	(Russia) SMP Racing	(Russia) Vitaly Petrov (Russia) Viktor Shaytar (Russia) Kirill Ladygin	BR Engineering BR01	D	29
DNF	LMP2	37	(Russia) SMP Racing	(Russia) Vitaly Petrov (Russia) Viktor Shaytar (Russia) Kirill Ladygin	Nissan VK45DE 4.5 L V8	D	29

FIA World Endurance Championship
Previous race: 2016 6 Hours of Nürburgring	2016 season	Next race: 6 Hours of Circuit of the Americas
