= Toyota TS040 Hybrid =

Le Mans Prototype 1 (LMP1) sports car

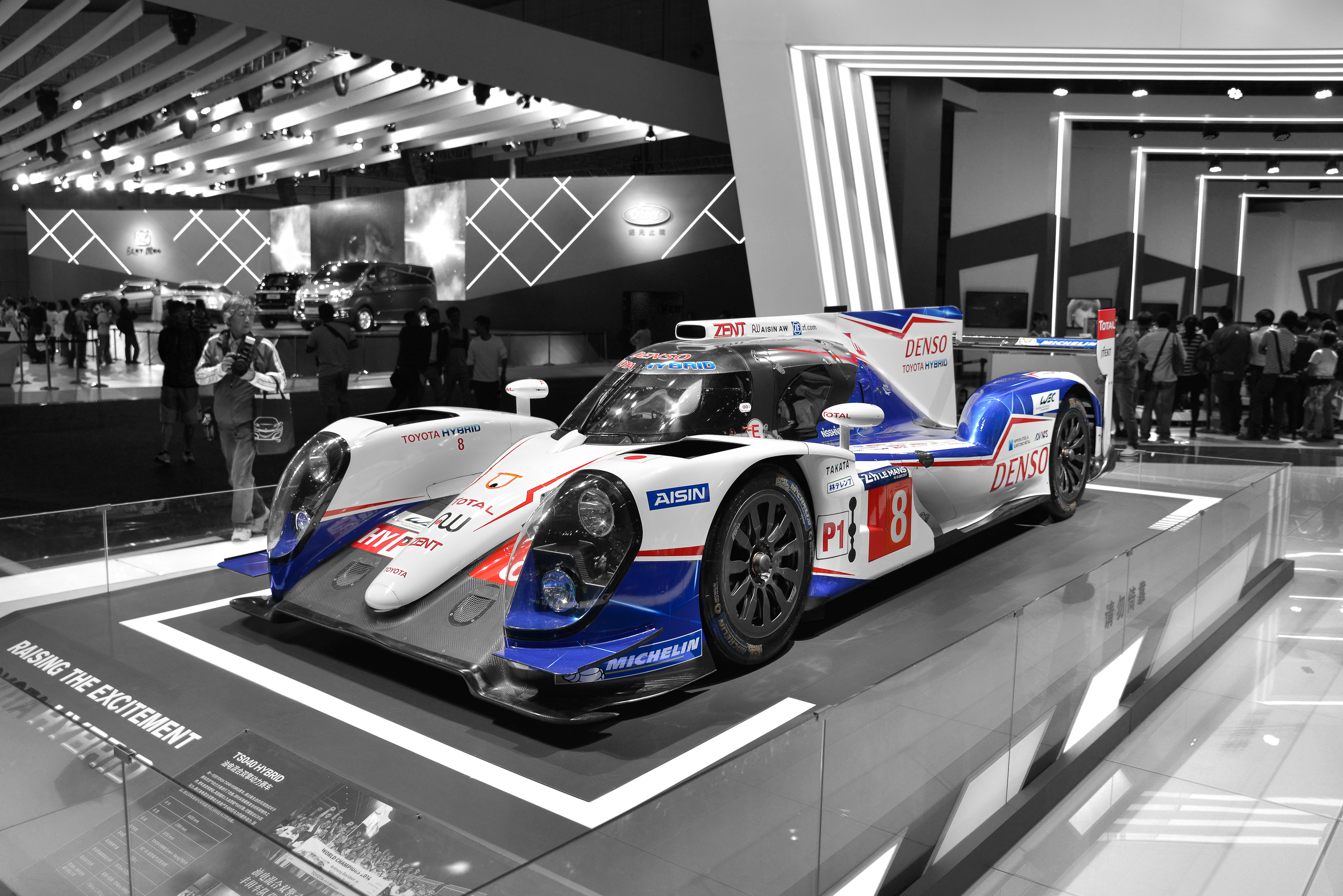
- The No. 8 Toyota TS040 Hybrid on display at the 2015 Auto Shanghai show
- Category: LMP1-H
- Constructor: Toyota
- Designer: Pascal Vasselon
- Predecessor: Toyota TS030 Hybrid
- Successor: Toyota TS050 Hybrid

Technical specifications
- Chassis: Carbon fibre and aluminium honeycomb monocoque
- Suspension (front): Independent
- Suspension (rear): Independent
- Length: 4650 mm (2015)
- Width: 1900 mm (2015)
- Height: 1050 mm (2015)
- Engine: Toyota RV8KLM 3.7 L 90-degree V8 Normally aspirated mid, longitudinally mounted
- Transmission: Toyota Gazoo Racing with Aisin internals 7-speed + 1 reverse Sequential
- Power: 382 kW (512 hp; 519 PS) (ICE); 353 kW (473 hp; 480 PS) (electric motors); 735 kW (986 hp) (combined)
- Weight: 873kg (1,924 lb)
- Fuel: Shell V-Power
- Lubricants: Total Quartz, later Mobil 1
- Tires: Michelin 31/71-18 front and rear radials

Competition history
- Notable entrants: (Japan) Toyota Racing
- Notable drivers: (Austria) Alexander Wurz; (France) Nicolas Lapierre; (Japan) Kazuki Nakajima; (United Kingdom) Mike Conway; (United Kingdom) Anthony Davidson; (France) Stéphane Sarrazin; (Switzerland) Sébastien Buemi
- Debut: 2014 6 Hours of Silverstone
- First win: 2014 6 Hours of Silverstone
- Last win: 2014 6 Hours of Bahrain
- Last event: 2015 6 Hours of Bahrain
| Races | Wins | Podiums | Poles | F/Laps |
|---|---|---|---|---|
| 16 | 5 | 14 | 4 | 4 |
- Constructors' Championships: 1 (2014 FIA WEC)
- Drivers' Championships: 1 (2014 FIA WEC)

The Toyota TS040 Hybrid is a Le Mans Prototype 1 (LMP1) sports car built and used by Toyota Motorsport GmbH in the 2014 and 2015 seasons of the FIA World Endurance Championship. Work on the car's design began in November 2012, when the Automobile Club de l'Ouest (ACO) published its 2014 technical regulations and Toyota utilised its resources after the 2013 24 Hours of Le Mans. The car is an aerodynamic improvement on its predecessor, the TS030 Hybrid, and its design allowed four-wheel drive. It has two kinetic energy recovery system (KERS) regenerative-braking devices at the front and rear axles to charge a supercapacitor and, in accordance with the 2014 regulations, was placed in the 6 MJ (1.7 kWh) class. The TS040's engine was carried over from the TS030; its displacement was increased from 3.4 L (210 cu in) to 3.7 L (230 cu in) for better efficiency, producing 513 horsepower (383 kW) to the rear wheels.

The TS040 was shown to the press for the first time at the 26 March preseason test session at Circuit Paul Ricard, and was driven 25,000 km (16,000 mi) before the start of the 2014 season. Toyota supplied two cars, driven by six drivers, for the season. Nicolas Lapierre, Anthony Davidson and Sébastien Buemi won the season's opening two races in the No. 8 car; Lapierre aquaplaned, crashing at the 24 Hours of Le Mans before recovering to finish third. After the crash, Lapierre was dropped and Buemi and Nakajima won two more races and had another podium finish to win the 2014 World Endurance Drivers' Championship. Consistent performances from Alexander Wurz, Stéphane Sarrazin, Kazuki Nakajima and reserve driver Mike Conway won Toyota the World Endurance Manufacturers' Championship at the season-ending 6 Hours of São Paulo.

The car was further developed after the 2014 24 Hours of Le Mans in accordance with the 2015 regulations. The front of the TS040 changed, a new suspension preserved tyre life, its supercapacitor was altered for better performance, and two body kits were created to match the car to a track. Although the season began with a third-place finish for the No. 1 car (driven by Buemi, Nakajima and Davidson) at the 6 Hours of Silverstone, the TS040 struggled against rivals Audi and Porsche in the seven remaining rounds before Wurz, Sarrazin and Conway's No. 2 entry finished second at the season-ending 6 Hours of Bahrain; Toyota placed third in the World Endurance Manufacturers' Championship. The TS040 was replaced by the TS050 Hybrid for the 2016 season.

== Development ==
=== Concept ===
The TS040's initial studies and simulations began immediately after the Automobile Club de l'Ouest (ACO) published its first revision of the 2014 FIA World Endurance Championship technical regulations in November 2012. Toyota gradually increased their involvement in the car's development, focusing on the project after the 2013 24 Hours of Le Mans. The TS040, designed to meet the new Le Mans Prototype 1 (LMP1) regulations to improve driver safety and enhance visibility, was an aerodynamic improvement on the TS030 Hybrid. Built at Toyota Motorsport headquarters in the North Rhine-Westphalia city of Cologne, the car's chassis design was supervised by engineer Pascal Vasselon. The TS040's engines were built in Japan, and the team was directed by the French racing squad Oreca.

=== Design ===
The car was refined with hardware-in-the-loop technology and computer-calculation hardware to test individual components based on track data, enabling engineers to optimise its design; and was more efficient than test driving. The new LMP1 regulations made the TS040 10 cm (100 mm) shorter than its predecessor and reduced the width of the tyre arches by 5 cm (50 mm); most attention focused on reducing drag and increasing downforce (improving road grip), lowering its fuel consumption by 25 per cent over 2013. The TS040's aerodynamic design was conducted at Toyota Motorsports' wind tunnel in Cologne. Toyota achieved their objective of lowering the car's weight by the mandated 45 kg (99 lb) with design and lightweight components.

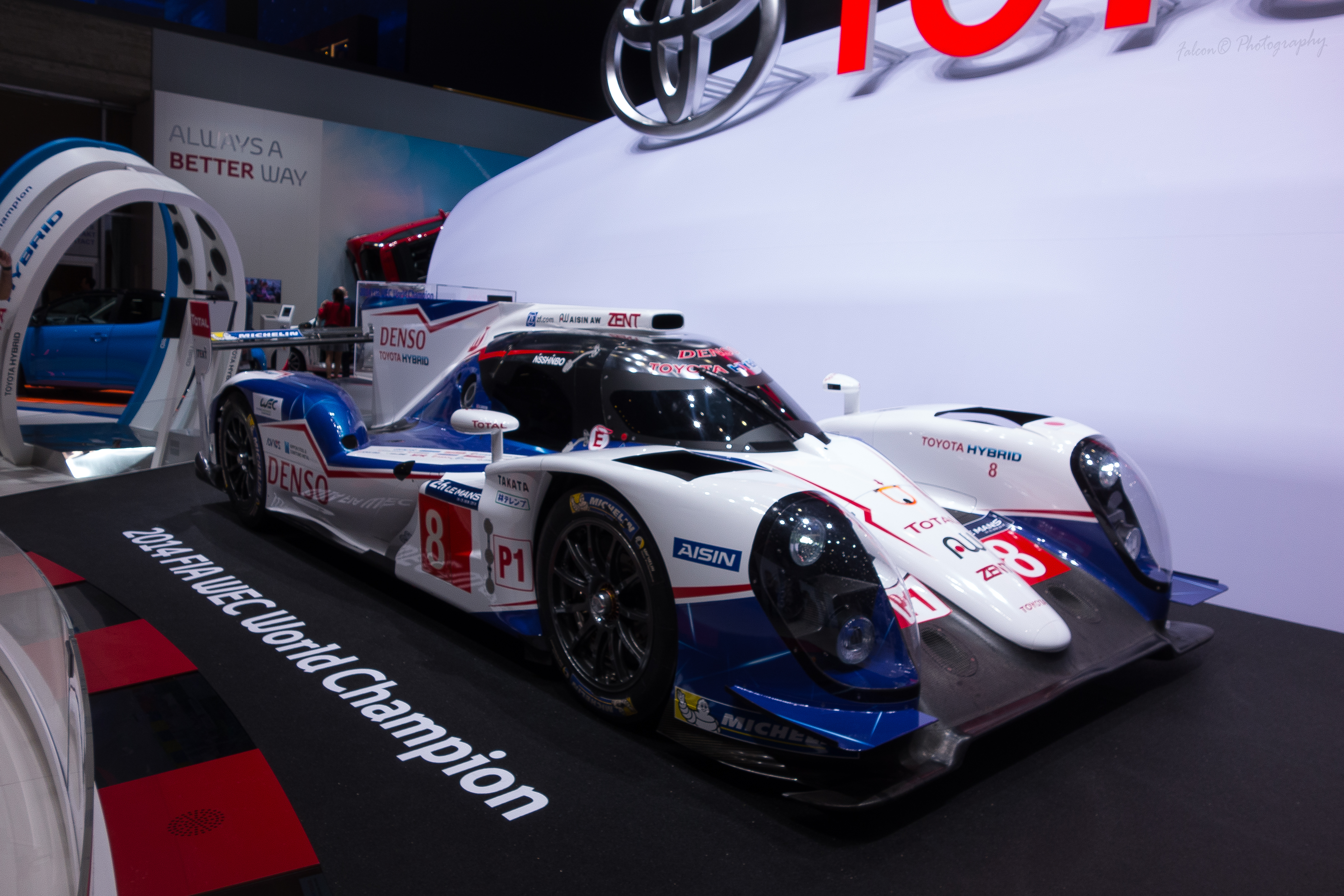
The No. 8 Toyota TS040 Hybrid on display at the 2015 24 Hours of Le Mans

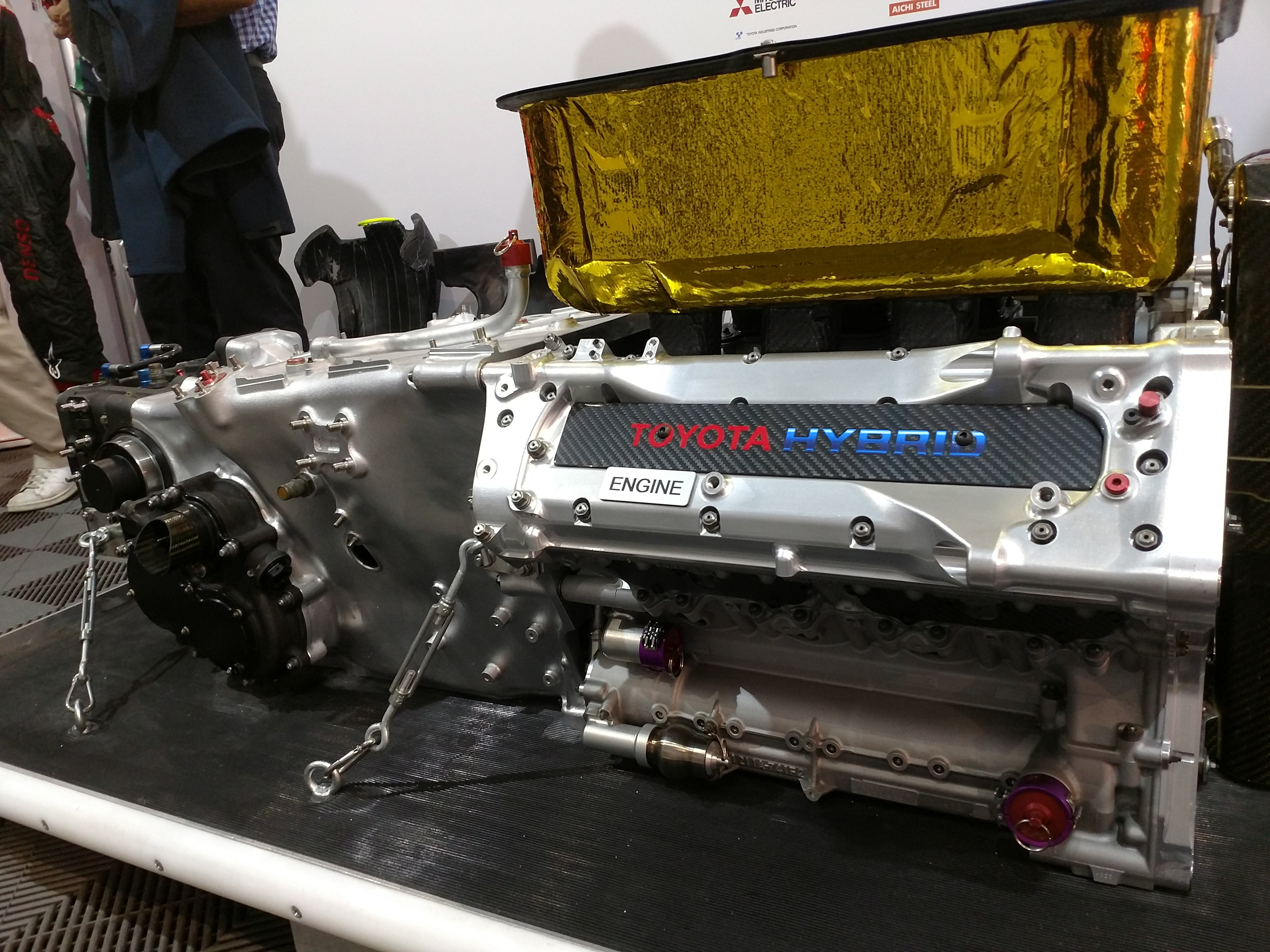
The Toyota TS040 Hybrid 3.7l V8 petrol engine and gearbox assembly on display

The TS040's design permitted four-wheel drive, and its chassis consisted of carbon fibre and aluminium materials. (Note: The TS040 Hybrid was the first four-wheel drive racing car built by Toyota since the 2007 Supra HV-R that won the Tokachi 24 Hours outright that year.) Front airflow to cool the chassis was enabled with exit ducts under the wing mirror stalk at the back of the front wheel guards. Independent push-rod suspensions are linked to a bellcrank, and the torsion bar is mounted at the pivot point. Total, Toyota's petrol supplier, worked with the team to enhance fuel efficiency and performance. The car's seven-speed sequential gearbox was made of aluminium, and the multiplate clutch was supplied to Toyota by ZF Friedrichshafen. The TS040's driveshaft was the constant-velocity joint type (including tripods), with a viscous-constructed mechanical locking differential. The dual-circuit Brembo brake discs, made of lightweight carbon ceramic materials, enabled hydraulically-activated power steering. Michelin remained the team's tyre supplier.

The car's mid-mounted, naturally-aspirated petrol V8 engine, angled at 90 degrees, was carried over from the TS030 Hybrid. Its displacement, increased from 3.4 L (210 cu in) to 3.7 L (230 cu in) by lengthening the stroke for better efficiency, supplied 513 horsepower (383 kW) to the rear wheels. The engine was developed to run with a fuel flow metre promoting a concept switch to efficiency from power. The bosses-mounted injection system were in the inlet tract and placed over the angled throttle valves relative to the inlet path. They were fitted with eight solenoid injectors which sent power each of the throttle runners and into the inlet portlets. Toyota installed two systems featuring knock control to detect vibration and real-time combustion pressure sensors to tune the spark timing among other engine components during a race for reliability purposes.

Like its predecessor, the TS040 had two kinetic energy recovery system (KERS) regenerative braking devices (the ACO used the alternate acronym, ERS) produced by Toyota Racing Development at the company's road research and development Higashi-Fuji Technical Center to charge a Nisshinbo supercapacitor. (Note: The supercapacitor was heavy, fast to charge and to drain, expensive to build and Toyota frequently changing it cost as much as an engine.) Additional power was directed to the axles (the rear by Denso and the front by Aisin AW), giving it an automatic horsepower increase of 473 hp (353 kW) for a total of 986 hp (735 kW). Its motor generator unit acted as a generator while braking, harvesting energy from the drive shaft to slow the car and convert into electricity which is stored in the supercapacitor. The 2014 regulations divided the motor-generator unit hierarchy into 2 MJ (0.56 kWh) increments, from 0 MJ (0 kWh) to 8 MJ (2.2 kWh). Toyota chose the 6 MJ (1.7 kWh) category, since the 8 MJ (2.2 kWh) class had a negative effect on lap time due to its additional weight.

=== 2015 alterations ===
New regulations were enacted for 2015, requiring an 80-per cent redesign of the TS040; this included a new front-end crash structure, a suspension optimised to preserve tyre life and additional weight reduction. Two body kits were designed: one for fast tracks and the other for tight turns. Designers added a guide vane below the car's headlights for balance while braking, but felt that a second (at the rear of the vehicle) would create turbulence. Little work was conducted on the powertrain. Although Toyota considered changing to a battery system, comparing its hybrid technology with that installed in the Porsche 919 Hybrid and switching to the 8 MJ (2.2 kWh) category, the manufacturer ultimately decided to remain in the 6 MJ (1.7 kWh) class. However, the TS040's supercapacitor was modified for enhanced performance. Construction of the car began immediately after the 2014 24 Hours of Le Mans, and continued until January 2015.

== Preparation and drivers ==
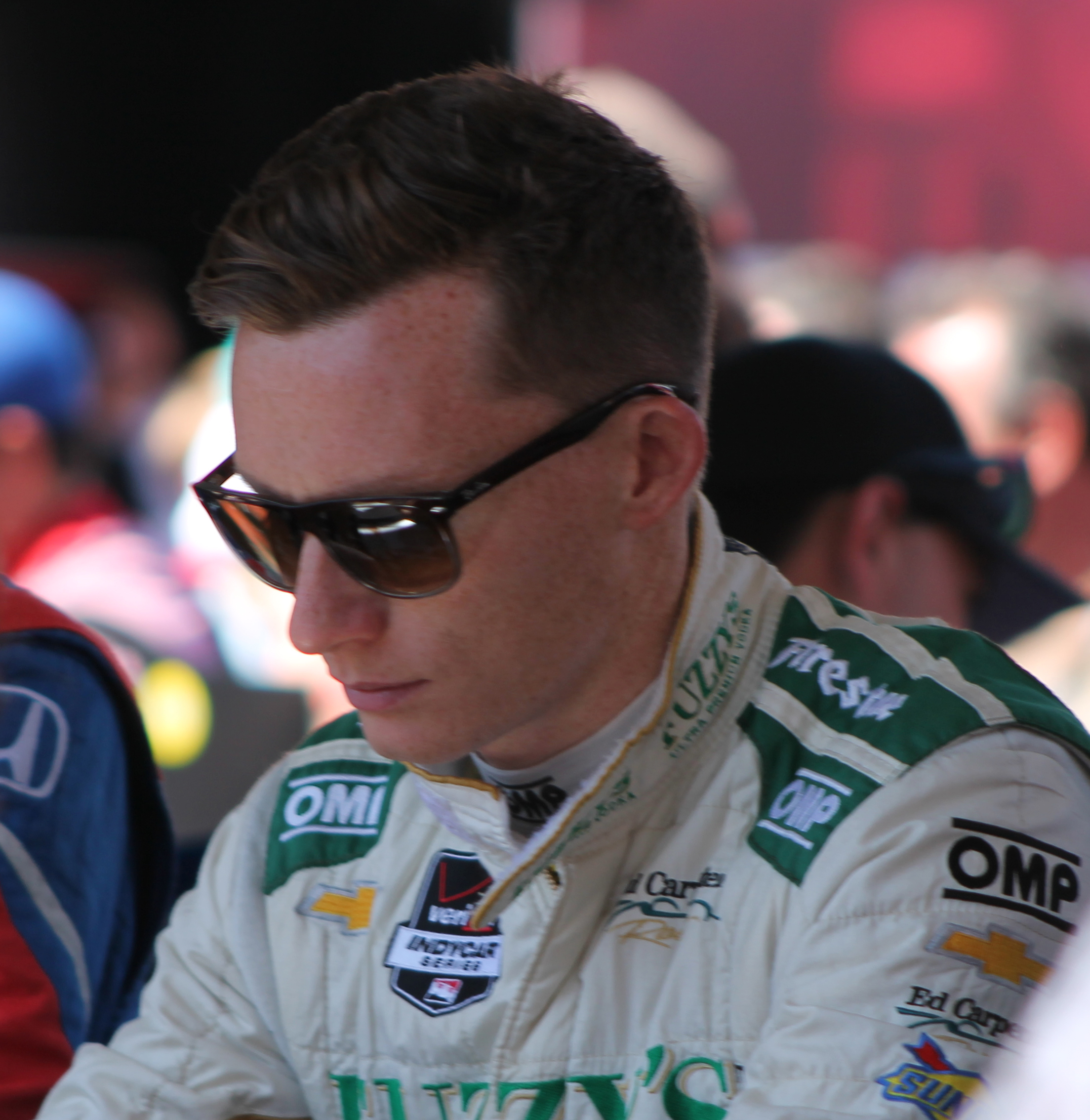
Mike Conway joined Toyota as their test and reserve driver in late 2013.

Toyota announced that they would continue participating in the FIA World Endurance Championship with a new car in July 2013. Drivers Alexander Wurz, Nicolas Lapierre, Kazuki Nakajima, Anthony Davidson, Stéphane Sarrazin and Sébastien Buemi were resigned to the team. Details of the TS040 Hybrid were released to the public by engineer Pascal Vasselon at the 2013 6 Hours of São Paulo meeting on 31 August. Toyota signed IndyCar Series driver (and 2013 Le Mans Prototype 2 (LMP2) quadruple winner for G-Drive Racing) Mike Conway as a reserve and test driver. The TS040s' lineups were changed in February 2014, with Sarrazin moving to the No. 7 car and Lapierre to No. 8 entry after Toyota evaluated driver strengths and characteristics.

The TS040 began private testing on the morning of 21 January at the Circuit Paul Ricard, when Wurz and Davidson completed a shakedown session and remained at the track for two days without major problems. The first long-distance pictures of the car being tested at the track were published in the automotive media eight days later, and more photographs and the first video of the TS040 being driven by Davidson in wet weather were released on 3 March. Testing continued into March at the Algarve International Circuit and the Ciudad del Motor de Aragón. On 26 March, the TS040 was introduced to the press during the three-day preseason test session at the Circuit Paul Ricard. The cars had covered more than 25,000 km (16,000 mi) before their competitive debut at the season-opening 6 Hours of Silverstone in April.

== Racing history ==
=== 2014 ===
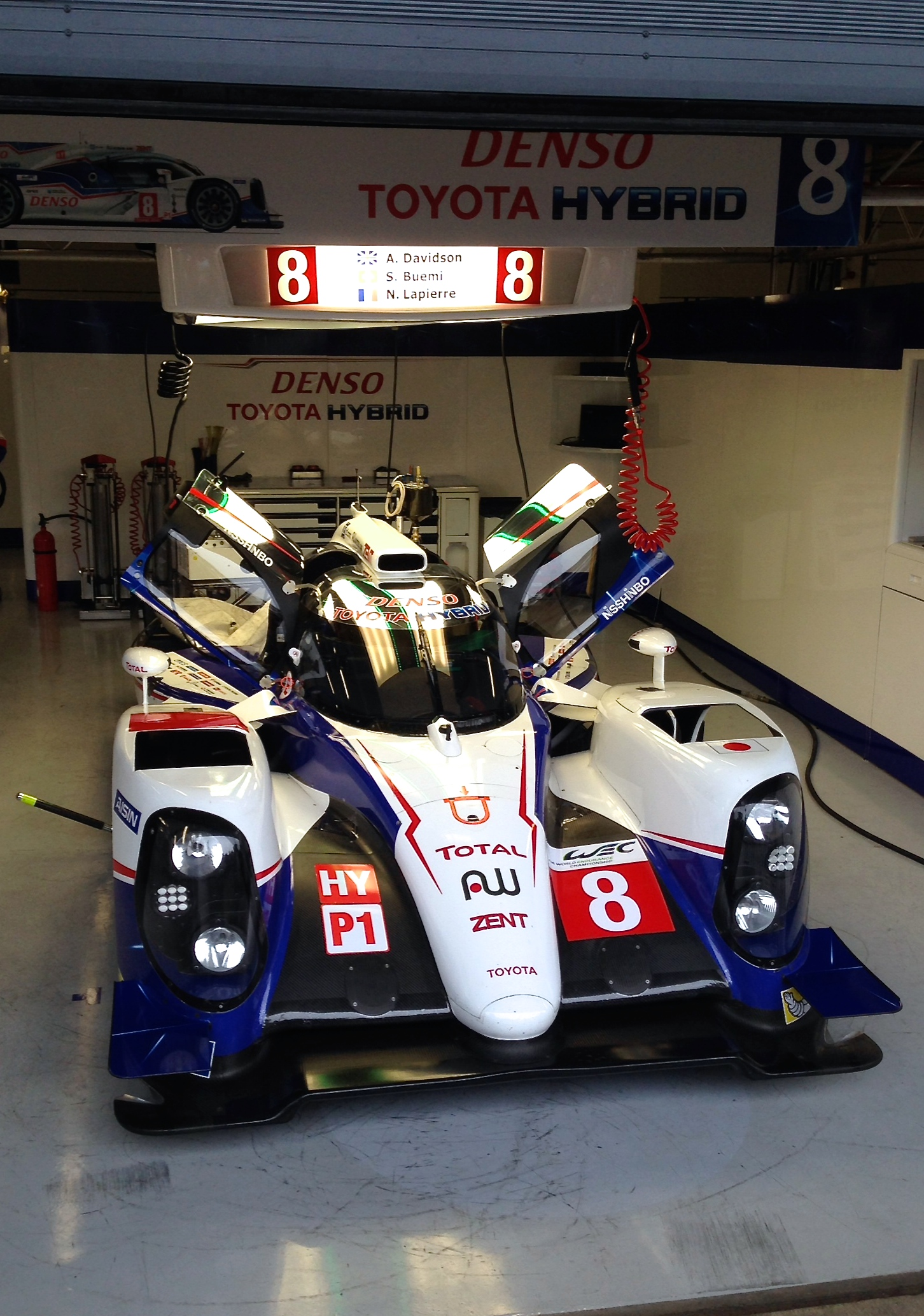
The No. 8 TS040 in the pits at the 2014 6 Hours of Silverstone.

At Silverstone (despite not topping any of the three practice sessions held before qualifying), the No. 7 TS040 driven by Wurz and Nakajima took pole position by five-thousands of a second from the No. 1 Audi R18 e-tron quattro of Loïc Duval and Tom Kristensen; Davidson and Lapierre's No. 8 car qualified fifth. In the race, Wurz led from the start until he was delayed by traffic and overtaken by André Lotterer in the No. 2 Audi on the fourteenth lap and sometime later Buemi moved to second. Rain fell soon afterwards; Wurz was on rain tyres, and Buemi was on intermediates. The weather conditions improved afterwards, and Buemi's strategy gave the No. 8 car the overall lead. Lapierre and (later) Nakajima did not cede position for the rest of the rain-shortened race to win. Sarrazin and (later) Davidson prevailed over Mark Webber's No. 20 Porsche to finish second.

Two weeks later in changeable track conditions at the 6 Hours of Spa-Francorchamps, Neel Jani and Marc Lieb's No. 14 Porsche beat Buemi and Davidson for the pole position in the final seconds of qualifying; Sarrazin and Nakajima placed fourth. The No. 14 Porsche held the lead for the opening two hours, before Buemi took over the position (due to Toyota's double-stinting their tyres) and Lieb stalled in the pit lane which allowed Buemi to increase his advantage over Lieb and (later) Romain Dumas, who slowed with an electrical fault which disabled his hybrid system and resulting in the car losing two laps. Davidson, Buemi and Lapierre's No. 8 TS040 was unhindered thereafter for their second consecutive win. The No. 7 Toyota's oversteer and lack of grip cost Wurz, Nakajima and Sarrazin a battle between the lead Audi of Kristensen, Lucas di Grassi and Duval in the second half of the race.

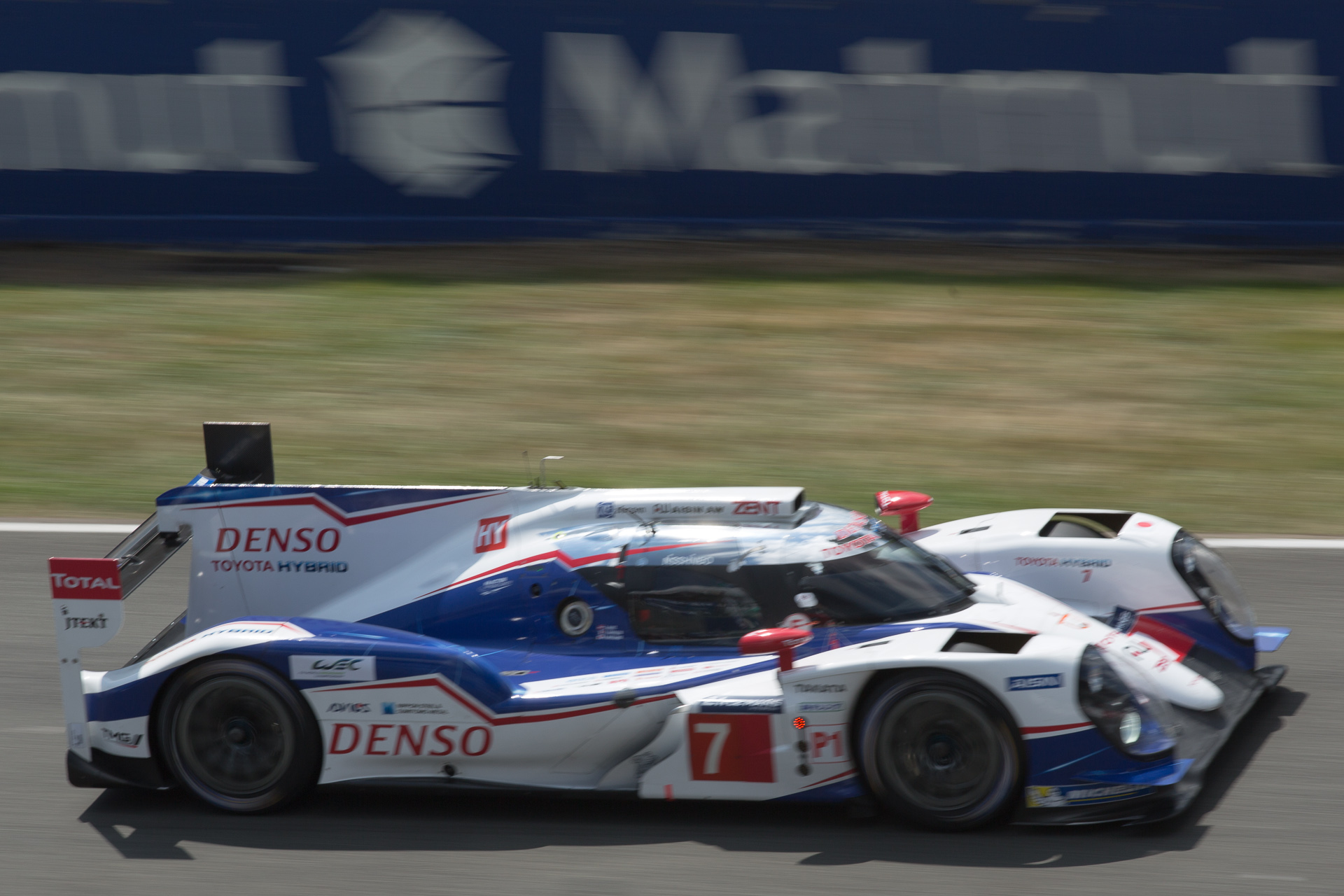
Kazuki Nakajima put the No. 7 car in pole position for Le Mans, but retired due to a melted wiring loom.

In the trio of qualifying sessions held to determine the grid for the 24 Hours of Le Mans, Nakajima in the No. 7 car bumped Porsche from the top of the time sheets and improved in the following session to secure Toyota's first pole position at Le Mans since the 1999 race. Buemi put the No. 8 car third, separated from Nakajima by Dumas' Porsche. Wurz started in the No. 7 car and led for most of the opening hours, and Lapierre spun from second after leaving a Mulsanne Straight chicane. Lapierre put the No. 8 car out of contention in the second hour, caught by a change in weather conditions between Marco Bonanomi's No. 2 Audi and Sam Bird's No. 81 AF Corse Ferrari 458 on the Mulsanne Straight and aquaplaning into the barriers. Lapierre returned to the pit lane, and the No. 8 car recovered to finish third overall. Sarrazin took over from Wurz, and lost the lead through the pit-stop phase to Porsche drivers Brendon Hartley and Timo Bernhard before reclaiming it in the fourth hour. As Nakajima drove the No. 7 Toyota into its ninth hour in the lead, the car lost power when an FIA-mandated piece of monitoring equipment melted a wiring loom and forced him to abandon the car at Arnage corner.

Seven weeks before the 6 Hours of Circuit of the Americas, it was announced that Conway would take over Nakajima's driving duties in the No. 7 TS040 because Nakajima had a Super Formula commitment that weekend at Autopolis. On a wet track which made driving tricky, Buemi and Davidson achieved another pole position for the No. 7 car; Sarrazin and Conway started fifth. Buemi led for the first hour, with Wurz moving the No. 7 car up to second in the opening laps. A heavy thunderstorm in the second hour stopped the race after Lapierre and Conway aquaplaned off the circuit. This put Lapierre a lap behind the leaders, and Conway was beached in the gravel trap. They restarted in fourth and seventh overall; Buemi drove the No. 8 car to third place, and Wurz finished sixth in No. 7. Lapierre missed the 6 Hours of Fuji due to "personal circumstances"; Toyota did not replace him with Conway, leaving Davidson and Buemi to drive the No. 8 TS040.

They again took the pole position, and Wurz and Nakajima were fourth. The No. 8 car only ceded the lead on the race's first lap and the pit stops to Webber's No. 20 Porsche (which made an unscheduled pit stop to replace a punctured tyre) to win; the No. 7 came second. Going into the 6 Hours of Shanghai, Lapierre was announced as not taking any further part in 2014 and plans were made to substitute him with Conway for the season's two remaining races: the 6 Hours of Bahrain and the 6 Hours of São Paulo. Buemi and Davidson qualified with an identical two-lap average time with Lieb and Dumas in the No. 20 Porsche; pole position was awarded to the latter, since they set their times first. Wurz and Nakajima were a further two-tenths of a second behind in fourth. Buemi and Davidson gained the lead from Porsche in the first minutes of the second hour through better pit-stop strategy and did not relinquish it, setting fast lap times consistently for the rest of the race to win. The No. 7 car had intermittent power issues which were eventually fixed, and finished a minute and twelve seconds behind its sister car in second.

Nakajima missed the Bahrain round due to a conflicting Super GT commitment in its season-closing race at Twin Ring Motegi, and Conway took over his role in the No. 7 car. Buemi and Davidson qualified the No. 8 TS040 in second, with Wurz and Conway obtaining a fourth-place starting position for the No. 7 car. The No. 8 car was delayed for a half an hour with an alternator problem in the second hour, allowing No. 7 to win the race; Buemi and Davidson recovered for an eleventh-place overall finish, earning them the 2014 World Endurance Drivers' Championship with a round to spare. (Note: Buemi and Davidson's Drivers' Championship victory was Toyota's first in international motorsport since Didier Auriol won the 1994 World Rally Championship.) Conway was again called up for São Paulo because Nakajima had visa problems. Buemi and Davidson recorded the third-quickest time in qualifying, and Conway and Sarrazin were the fifth-fastest. Toyota battled with rivals Audi and Porsche during the race, and Davidson's No. 8 TS040 was almost fifteen seconds behind Jani's No. 20 Porsche before competition ended with Webber's serious crash. Sarrazin was closing on the No. 1 Audi of Kristensen until the battle ended in Kristensen's favour. Toyota scored 289 points to win the 2014 World Manufacturers' Championship.

=== 2015 ===
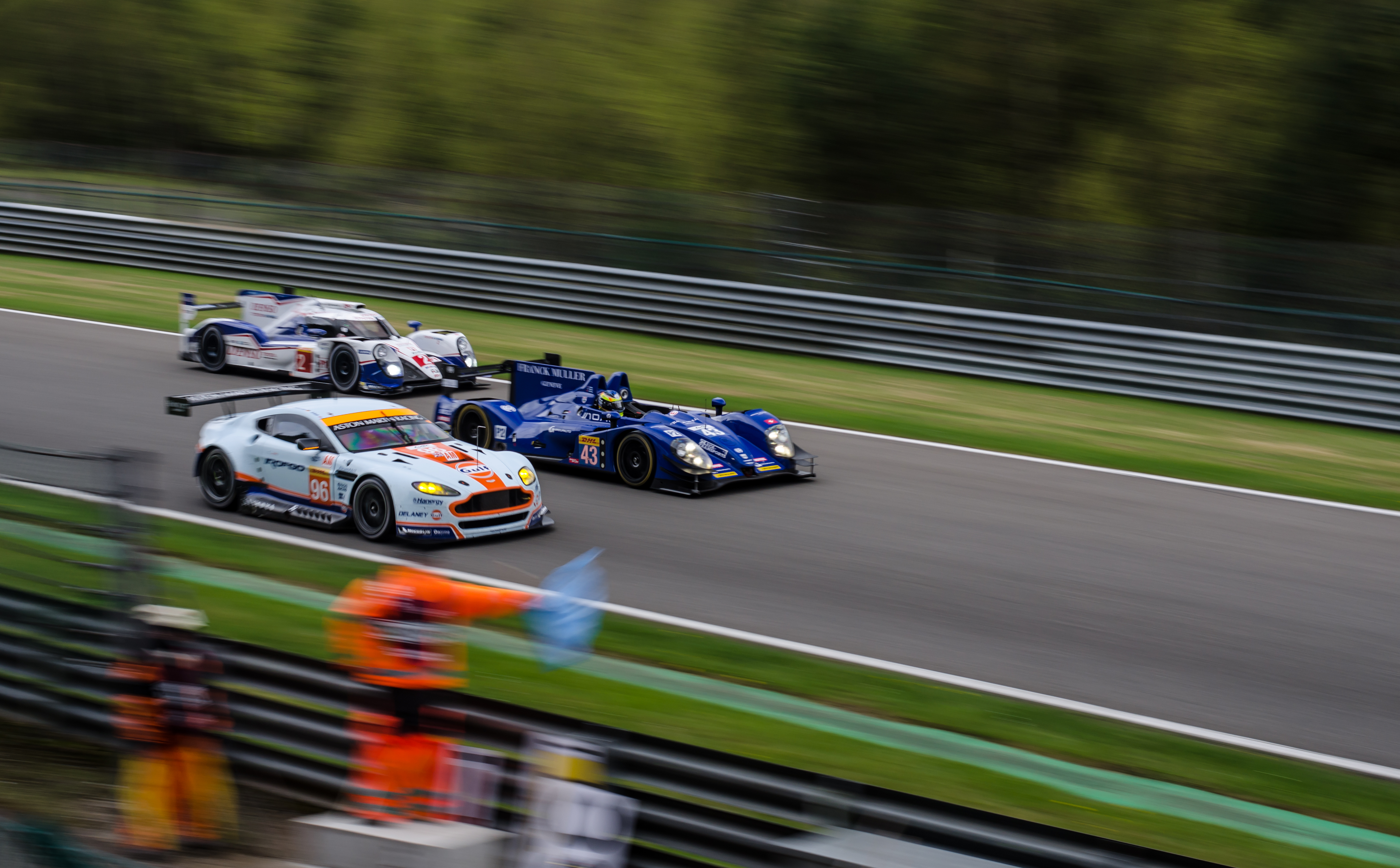
The No. 2 TS040 lapping competitors at the 2015 6 Hours of Spa-Francorchamps

The 2015 TS040 Hybrid was introduced at the Circuit Paul Ricard on 26 March, after 25,000 km (16,000 mi) of testing at the Ciudad del Motor de Aragón and the Algarve International Circuit. There were two driver changes, as Nakajima moved to the renumbered No. 1 TS040 full-time (after leaving Super GT) and Conway was promoted to a full-time spot in the No. 2 car. Former Formula One racer Kamui Kobayashi was signed as Toyota's reserve driver, and Lapierre became the team's test driver. At the season-opening 6 Hours of Silverstone, Davidson and Nakajima qualified the No. 1 car in fourth position, and Sarrazin and Conway placed the sister No. 2 car in sixth. Toyota were briefly first and second, challenging rivals Audi and Porsche before the No. 1 car finished fifteen seconds behind the No. 7 Audi of Marcel Fässler, Lotterer and Benoit Treluyer. The No. 2 car finished fourth; Conway had to enter the pit lane for a nose-cone change after running over a thin trackside bollard while lapping the No. 50 Larbre Compétition Chevrolet Corvette C7.R at Becketts corner.

During practice for the 6 Hours of Spa-Francorchamps, Nakajima collided heavily with the back of Oliver Jarvis's No. 8 Audi on the Kemmel Straight due to spray-impaired visibility and broke his back. He was not replaced by Kobayashi because the latter was unavailable, and Buemi and Davidson drove the No. 1 TS040 as a two-person entry. Starting in sixth place, they held fifth until Duval and di Grassi passed them; Conway and Sarrazin qualified in seventh. Both cars lacked the Audis' and Porsches' speed; the No. 2 car finished fifth, and the No. 1 car finished eighth with throttle and electrical problems. Nakajima was cleared by FIA medical delegate Jacques Tropenat to participate in the 24 Hours of Le Mans test day on 30 May, and was announced as taking part in the race four days later. In its three qualifying sessions, Sarrazin put the No. 2 car seventh; the No. 1 entry, driven by Nakajima, took eighth in the first session. None of Toyota's drivers improved their respective car's times in the later sessions.

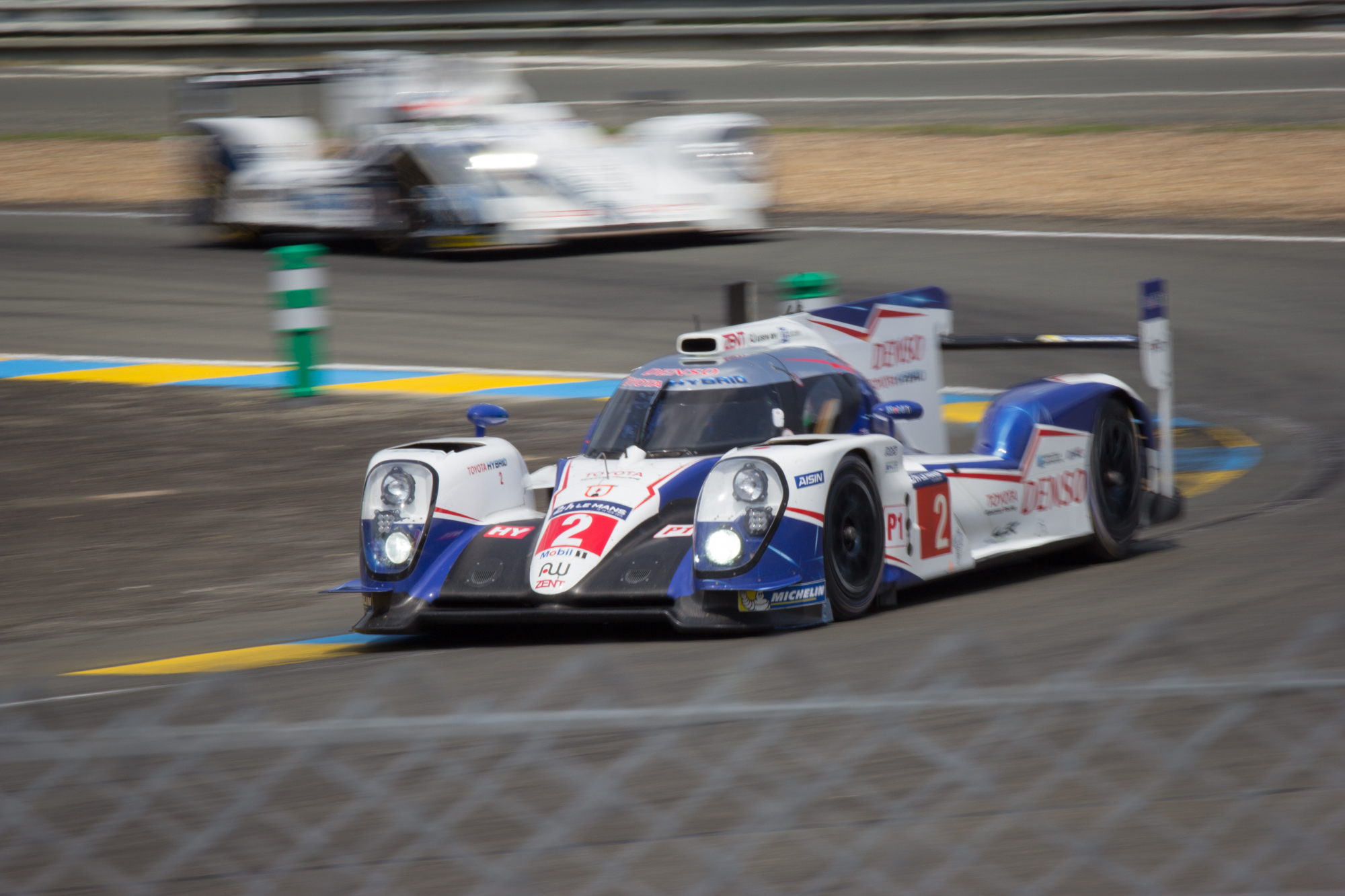
The No. 2 TS040 at the 2015 24 Hours of Le Mans

Toyota could not match Audi and Porsche's race pace, despite being more than two seconds per lap faster than in 2014. Davidson damaged the front right corner of the No. 1 car when he made contact with a Ferrari he was lapping (affecting its handling), and had another minor collision soon after. A thirteen-minute pit stop for replacement front and rear bodywork and the installation of a new left-rear suspension dropped him five laps behind the leader, and the car finished eighth. The No. 2 car passed the No. 9 Audi (when it had technical problems in the final hours) to finish sixth. Buemi and Davidson were nominated to drive the No. 1 TS040 to qualify for the inaugural 6 Hours of Nürburgring as part of the World Endurance Championship and placed fifth, with Wurz and Sarrazin starting from sixth. Both cars again could not match Audi and Porsche's pace, finishing three and four laps behind for fifth and sixth place.

In qualifying for the 6 Hours of Circuit of the Americas, Buemi and Davidson's No. 1 car narrowly clinched fifth place ahead of teammates Sarrazin and Conway in the No. 2 car. Buemi briefly moved to fourth place on the opening lap, with Wurz fifth. Davidson later relieved Buemi, but incurred a stop-and-go penalty for missing the pit-lane entry and narrowly avoided running out of fuel. After a 12-minute full-course yellow when an LMP2 car crashed, Conway spun to avoid hitting slower LMGTE traffic he was lapping. He soon lost control of the No. 2 car on turn eleven kerbing while going past slower cars, and retired after a heavy impact with the barrier. Nakajima later drove the No. 1 car to fourth after the No. 18 Porsche experienced technical problems. Buemi and Nakajima qualified fifth, and Sarrazin and Conway took sixth for the 6 Hours of Fuji. Changeable weather conditions in the race's first two hours allowed Toyota to challenge Audi and Porsche until they were distanced. Sarrazin hit the No. 88 Abu Dhabi-Proton Racing Porsche 911 RSR in the third hour, losing thirteen minutes as the No. 1 car's cooling system needed replacing; multiple penalties for the car's crew restricted them to sixth.

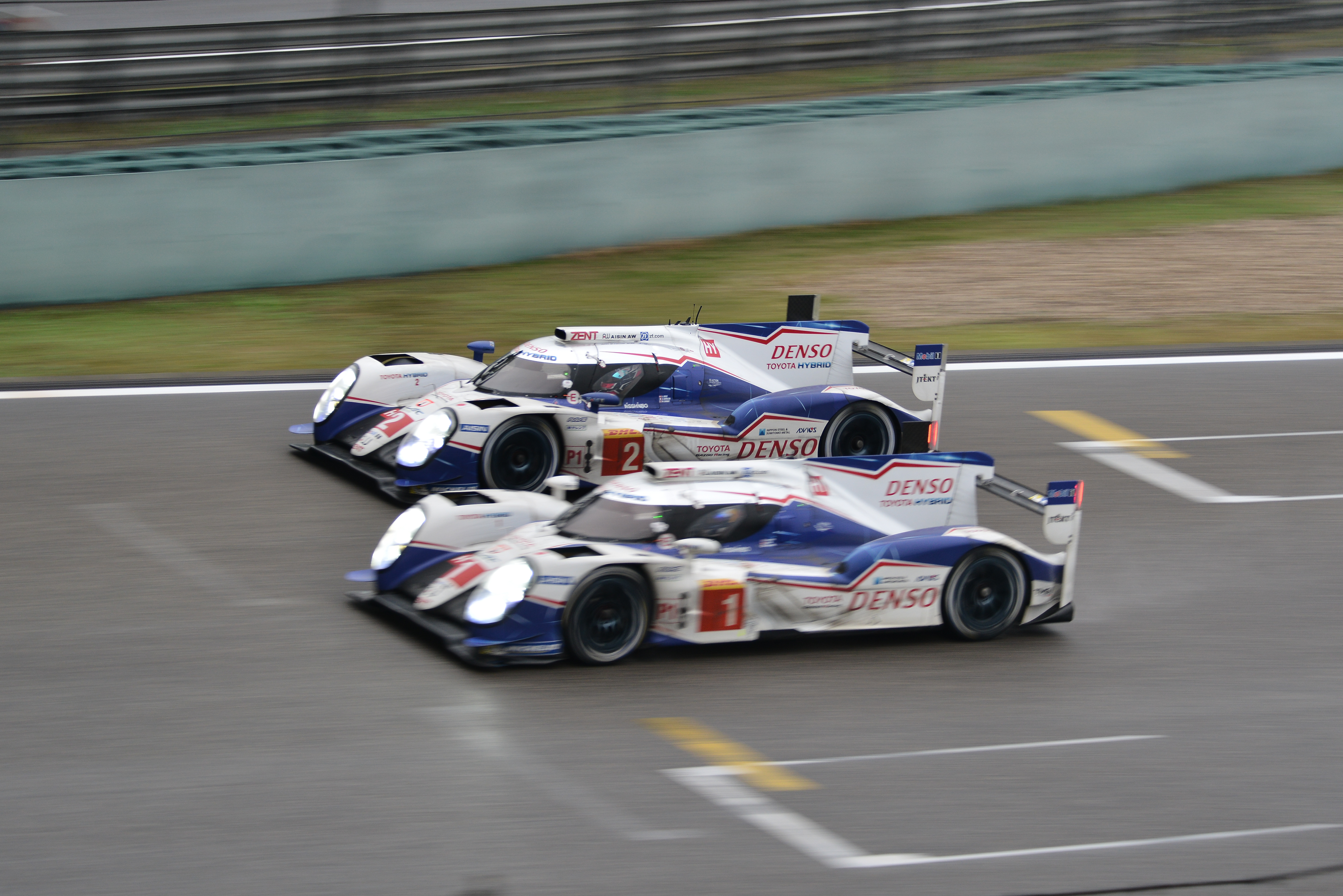
TS040 duo in formation at the 2015 6 Hours of Shanghai

At the 6 Hours of Shanghai, Toyota once again qualified on the third row of the grid; Buemi and Davidson started from fifth place, and Wurz and Conway secured the sixth position. After some positional changes following the safety car start due to morning rain, Davidson ran fifth until a slow puncture forced him into the pit lane. He regained the place until Wurz spun on the wet track and Nakajima spun into the gravel trap on the track's final turn. The track gradually dried, and Buemi drove the No. 1 car to a fifth-place finish; Sarrazin took sixth in the No. 2 car. Toyota again began from the third row of the grid, with Davidson and Nakajima going faster than Wurz and Sarrazin at the season-ending 6 Hours of Bahrain. Both cars moved into fourth and fifth after the No. 17 Porsche was forced into the pit lane for repairs. Later, Nakajima was forced into the pit lane to change the No. 1 vehicle's front bodywork after hitting the No. 36 Signatech Alpine A450b. The No. 2 car moved into third when the No. 8 Audi required repairs, and held the position for the rest of the race; the No. 2 car was close behind in fourth. Competing with the TS040 Hybrid for the second consecutive year, Toyota accumulated 164 points and finished third in the World Endurance Manufacturers' Championship.

== Retirement from competition ==
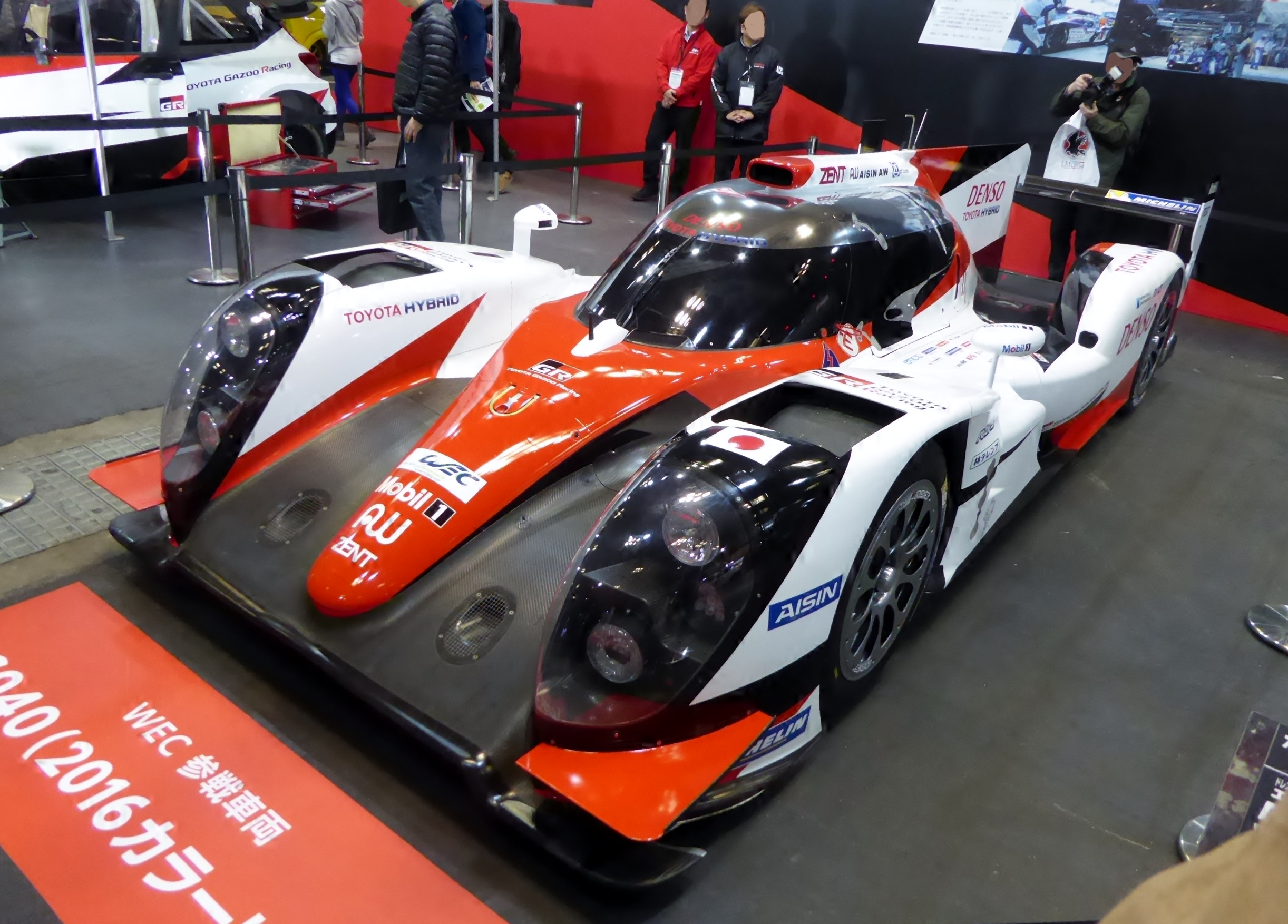
The TS040 Hybrid in the livery of its eventual successor on display at the 2016 Osaka Auto Messe

Bird, Conway and Davidson shared driving duties of a TS040 at the post-season rookie test session at the Bahrain International Circuit the day after the 6 Hours of Bahrain. A 2015-specification TS040 chassis was tested in January 2016 at the Ciudad del Motor de Aragón and the Circuit Paul Ricard with its successor, the TS050 Hybrid.

== World Endurance Championship results ==
(Races in bold indicate pole position; races in italics indicate fastest lap)

Complete FIA World Endurance Championship results
| Year | Entrant | Class | Drivers | No. | Rds. | Rounds | | | | | | | | Points | Pos |
| Year | Entrant | Class | Drivers | No. | Rds. | 1 | 2 | 3 | 4 | 5 | 6 | 7 | 8 | Points | Pos |
|---|---|---|---|---|---|---|---|---|---|---|---|---|---|---|---|
| 2014 | Toyota Racing | LMP1-H | (United Kingdom) Mike Conway (Japan) Kazuki Nakajima (France) Stéphane Sarrazin (Austria) Alexander Wurz | 7 | 4, 7–8; 1–3, 5–6; All; All | SIL; **2** | SPA; 3 | LMS; **DNF** | COA; 6 | FUJ; 2 | SHA; 2 | BHR; 1 | SÃO; 4 | **289** | **1st** |
| 2014 | Toyota Racing | LMP1-H | (Switzerland) Sébastien Buemi (United Kingdom) Anthony Davidson (France) Nicolas Lapierre | 8 | All; All; 1–4 | SIL; 1 | SPA; 1 | LMS; 3 | COA; **3** | FUJ; **1** | SHA; 1 | BHR; 11 | SÃO; 2 | **289** | **1st** |
| 2015 | Toyota Racing | LMP1 | (Switzerland) Sébastien Buemi (United Kingdom) Anthony Davidson (Japan) Kazuki Nakajima | 1 | All; All; 1, 3–8 | SIL; 3 | SPA; 4 | LMS; 8 | NÜR; 5 | COA; 4 | FUJ; 5 | SHA; 6 | BHR; 4 | **164** | **3rd** |
| 2015 | Toyota Racing | LMP1 | (United Kingdom) Mike Conway (France) Stéphane Sarrazin (Austria) Alexander Wurz | 2 | All; All; All | SIL; 4 | SPA; 6 | LMS; 6 | NÜR; 6 | COA; Ret | FUJ; 6 | SHA; 5 | BHR; 3 | **164** | **3rd** |

== See also ==
- Porsche 919 Hybrid
- Audi R18 e-tron quattro
- Nissan GT-R LM Nismo
