= Chevrolet Corvette C7.R =

Grand tourer racing car

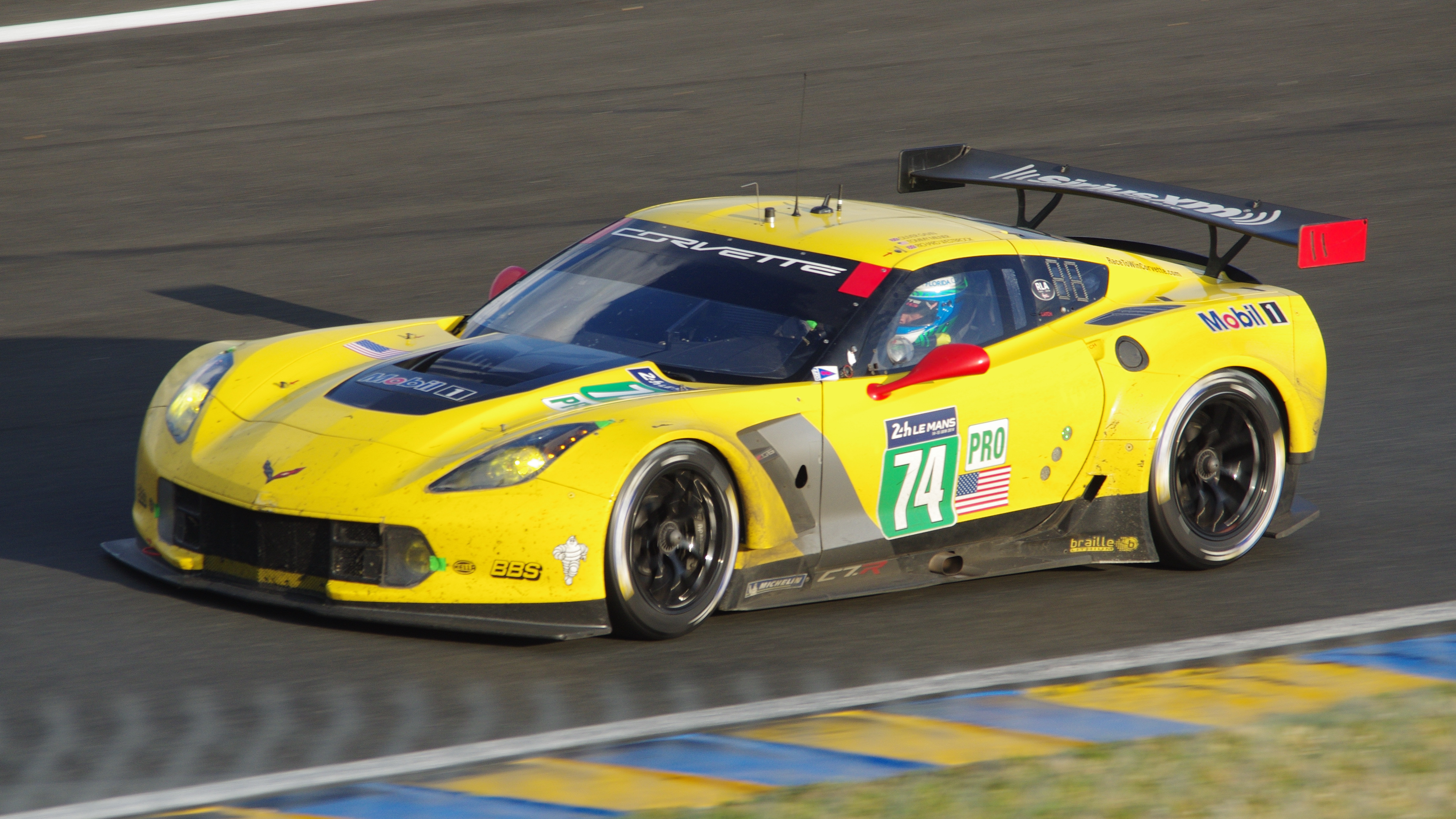
- The No. 74 C7.R at the 2014 24 Hours of Le Mans
- Category: IMSA SportsCar Championship GTLM; 24 Hours of Le Mans LMGTE Pro
- Constructor: (United States) Chevrolet (Pratt Miller)
- Designer: Ray Monahan
- Predecessor: Chevrolet Corvette C6.R
- Successor: Chevrolet Corvette C8.R

Technical specifications
- Chassis: Aluminium monocoque
- Suspension (front): Short/long arm double wishbone, fabricated steel upper and lower control arms, coil over adjustable shock absorbers
- Suspension (rear): As front
- Length: 4,496 mm (177 in)
- Width: 2,050 mm (81 in)
- Height: 1,151 mm (45 in)
- Wheelbase: 2,708 mm (107 in)
- Engine: Chevrolet LT5.5R 5,493 cubic centimetres (5 litres; 335 cubic inches) V8 90° OHV/pushrod naturally aspirated, front engined, longitudinally mounted
- Transmission: Xtrac P529P/R 6-speed + 1 reverse semi-automatic gearbox
- Power: 491 hp (366 kW) @ 6,000 rpm, 485 lb⋅ft (658 N⋅m) @ 4,800 rpm torque
- Weight: 1,110 kg (2,447 lb) (excluding driver, fluids and fuel); 1,245 kg (2,745 lb) (including driver, fluids and fuel)
- Fuel: VP Racing Fuels Ethanol C85 E85 (2014-2015) later MS100 E20 (2016-2019) (IMSA SportsCar Championship); Shell V-Power (2014-2017) later Total (2018-2019) Ethanol E10 (24 Hours of Le Mans)
- Lubricants: Mobil 1, Motul and Valvoline
- Tyres: Michelin; BBS forged magnesium wheels

Competition history
- Notable entrants: (United States) Corvette Racing (France) Larbre Compétition
- Notable drivers: (Spain) Antonio García (United States) Tommy Milner (Denmark) Jan Magnussen (Australia) Ryan Briscoe (United States) Jordan Taylor (United Kingdom) Oliver Gavin (United Kingdom) Robin Liddell (Germany) Mike Rockenfeller (Denmark) Kristian Poulsen (Denmark) Nicolai Sylvest (Italy) Gianluca Roda (Italy) Paolo Ruberti (France) Pierre Ragues (Japan) Yutaka Yamagishi (France) Jean-Philippe Belloc (United States) Ricky Taylor (United Kingdom) Lars Viljoen (France) Romain Brandela (Switzerland) Marcel Fässler
- Debut: 2014 24 Hours of Daytona
- First win: 2014 Tequila Patrón Sports Car Showcase
- Last win: 2018 BUBBA Burger Sports Car Grand Prix
- Last event: 2019 Petit Le Mans
| Races | Wins |
|---|---|
| 65 | 16 (including 2015 24 Hours of Le Mans) |
- Teams' Championships: 3 (2016 IMSA SCC, 2017 IMSA SCC, 2018 IMSA SCC)
- Constructors' Championships: 2 (2016 IMSA SCC, 2017 IMSA SCC)
- Drivers' Championships: 3 (2016 IMSA SCC, 2017 IMSA SCC, 2018 IMSA SCC)

The Chevrolet Corvette C7.R is a grand tourer racing car built by Pratt Miller and Chevrolet for competition in endurance racing between 2014 and 2019. It is a replacement for the Corvette C6.R racing car, using the C7 generation Chevrolet Corvette as a base. The C7 road car was noted to incorporate development from the Corvette C6.R, thus those properties also carry over to the race car. The Corvette Racing C7.R raced in the WeatherTech SportsCar Championship in the GT Le Mans (GTLM) class.

== Development ==
The Corvette C7.R had its official unveiling at the 2014 NAIAS in Detroit. The car made its first testing appearance, in camouflage, at the Rolex Motorsports Union at the Mazda Raceway Laguna Seca track. The car's new livery and details were revealed on January 13, 2014.

== Successes ==
=== 2014 ===
In its first year the C7.R competed in a field of 12 cars in a season that included eleven races. The C7.R won four races in a row in the middle of the season (Long Beach, Laguna Seca, Watkins Glen and Canadian Tire Motorsports Park). After that point no more first place victories accrued to Corvette, but the #4 Corvette, driven by Jan Magnussen and Antonio Garcia, accumulated enough points to finish second place in total team points for the season.

Because of consistent performance throughout the season, Magnussen and Garcia placed first in the Driver Championship with 125 points. They were followed by the BMW team of Dirk Müller and Joey Hand while third place driver points went to the other Corvette team of Oliver Gavin and Tommy Milner.

=== 2015 ===
In 2015 the field of competitors dropped to ten, and the number of events also was reduced to ten. Corvette Racing had a total of three wins in the C7.R. The 2015 season started out well for the C7.R as the car won the first two North American Endurance Cup races at the 53rd Rolex 24 at Daytona in January and the 63rd Annual Mobil 1 12 Hours of Sebring two months later driven by Jan Magnussen, Ryan Briscoe, and Antonio Garcia in the Tudor United SportsCar Championship. But neither Corvette finished better than third place for the remainder of the season. The C7.R finished the season in third place behind the Porsche 911 RSR and BMW Z4 GTE and ahead of the Ferrari 458 Italia GT2.

The Corvette C7.R scored its first Le Mans win at the 2015 24 Hours of Le Mans, with Oliver Gavin, Tommy Milner, and Jordan Taylor driving the #64 Corvette to victory in the GTE-Pro class. It is also Corvette Racing's 8th win at the circuit. Corvette Racing won endurance racing's infamous "triple crown" with wins at the 24 hours of Daytona, 12 hours of Sebring, and the 24 hours of Le Mans all in the same year.

=== 2016 ===
Ahead of the season, the car received an update, which included a new diffuser, to comply with the new for 2016 Group GTE regulations, aimed at increasing the performance of the class. On the car's inaugural race of the year, the 2016 Rolex 24 Hours of Daytona, the Corvette racing team scored a class win with a photo finish between the numbers 3 and 4 cars, driven by Oliver Gavin and Antonio Garcia with Khayman Buff as a back up driver. The cars finished .034 seconds apart from one another. In that year, the Corvette C7.R scored its second 12 Hours of Sebring win with car #4 driven by Oliver Gavin, Tommy Milner and Marcel Fässler in the GTLM Class. The C7.R did poorly in the 2016 24 Hours of Le Mans, qualifying last in the GTE Pro category and finishing the race 7th and 10th in the GTE-Pro class. The #4 Corvette C7.R went on to win the WeatherTech Sportscar Championship in the GTLM class. They won the drivers', team, and manufacturers' championship, as well as the North American Endurance cup. Corvette Racing also claimed its milestone 100th win for the team with its first-place finish at Lime Rock in the WeatherTech Sportscar Championship series.

=== 2017 ===
Twelve teams competed in the GTLM class for the 2017 WeatherTech SportsCar Championship including four Ford GT entries. The C7.R enjoyed another successful year in 2017 with first place victories at Sebring, COTA, Long Beach, and VIR. The #3 Corvette driven by Antonio Garcia, Jan Magnussen, and Mike Rockenfeller went on to win the drivers', team, and manufacturers' championship—a repeat of the 2016 season sweep for Corvette Racing. The #4 Corvette driven by Oliver Gavin, Tommy Milner, and Marcel Fassler took second place honors.

=== 2018 ===
The field of GTLM teams declined to nine for the 2018 season. Of the eleven races, one of the other Ford GT placed first in five races, one of the other Porsche placed first in three races, one of the BMWs placed first in two races, and the #4 Corvette earned a single first-place finish at Long Beach. The #3 Corvette, without winning a race, accumulated enough points to edge out the #67 Ford GT for the team championship—a "three peat". Antonio Garcia and Jan Magnussen secured 8 podium finishes out of the 11 race season—a consistency that had become a hallmark of Corvette Racing.

The 2018 GTLM scoring was tighter than it had been for the previous four years—a margin of victory of only 6 points. The #3 Corvette finished the season with first place points, followed by the #67 Ford GT in second place and the #4 Corvette in third place.

=== 2019 ===
This was the final year of IMSA competition for the C7.R, another year when nine teams would compete. With an aging platform, neither Corvette team achieved a first-place finish in any race in 2019. Of the 11 races, the #3 Corvette team finished second place three times and third place three times, accumulating enough points to tie the #911 Porsche for second place in the GTLM class of the WeatherTech SportsCar Championship.

== Debuts in auto shows ==
The Corvette C7.R was first unveiled at the 2014 North American International Auto Show. It was also a competitor at the 2016 Goodwood Festival of Speed.

== Results summary ==
=== Complete IMSA SportsCar Championship results ===
(key) Races in bold indicates pole position. Races in italics indicates fastest lap. (key) Races in bold indicates pole position. Races in italics indicates fastest lap.

Complete IMSA SportsCar Championship results
| Year | Entrant | Class | Drivers | No. | Rds. | Rounds | | | | | | | | | | | Pts. | Pos. |
| Year | Entrant | Class | Drivers | No. | Rds. | 1 | 2 | 3 | 4 | 5 | 6 | 7 | 8 | 9 | 10 | 11 | Pts. | Pos. |
|---|---|---|---|---|---|---|---|---|---|---|---|---|---|---|---|---|---|---|
| 2014 | (United States) Corvette Racing | GTLM | (Spain) Antonio García (Denmark) Jan Magnussen (Australia) Ryan Briscoe (United States) Jordan Taylor | 3 | All; 1-4, 7-10, 12-13; 1-2, 13; 11 | DAY; 10 | SEB; 8 | LBH; 1 | LGA; 1 | WGL; 1 | MOS; 1 | IMS; 4 | ELK; 6 | VIR; 7 | COA; 9 | ATL; 8 | 317 | 2nd |
| 2014 | (United States) Corvette Racing | GTLM | (United Kingdom) Oliver Gavin (United States) Tommy Milner (United Kingdom) Robin Liddell (Australia) Ryan Briscoe | 4 | All; All; 1-2; 13 | DAY; 5 | SEB; 6 | LBH; 3 | LGA; 5 | WGL; 5 | MOS; 7 | IMS; 5 | ELK; 7 | VIR; 9 | COA; 10 | ATL; 4 | 291 | 8th |
| 2015 | (United States) Corvette Racing | GTLM | (Spain) Antonio García (Denmark) Jan Magnussen (Australia) Ryan Briscoe | 3 | All; All; 1-2, 12 | DAY; 1 | SEB; 1 | LBH; 3 | LGA; 7 | **WGL**; **4** | MOS; 3 | ELK; 4 | VIR; 6 | COA; 6 | ATL; 6 | | 295 | 3rd |
| 2015 | (United States) Corvette Racing | GTLM | (United Kingdom) Oliver Gavin (United States) Tommy Milner (France) Simon Pagenaud (Australia) Ryan Briscoe | 4 | All; All; 1-2; 12 | **DAY**; **3** | SEB; 9 | LBH; 7 | LGA; 6 | WGL; 7 | MOS; 5 | ELK; 7 | VIR; 8 | COA; 8 | ATL; 3 | | 261 | 8th |
| 2016 | (United States) Corvette Racing | GTLM | (Spain) Antonio García (Denmark) Jan Magnussen (Germany) Mike Rockenfeller | 3 | All; All; 1-2, 12 | DAY; 2 | SEB; 9 | LBH; 9 | LGA; 4 | WGL; 7 | MOS; 3 | LIM; 2 | ELK; 6 | **VIR**; **1** | COA; 3 | ATL; 4 | 319 | 3rd |
| 2016 | (United States) Corvette Racing | GTLM | (United Kingdom) Oliver Gavin (United States) Tommy Milner (Switzerland) Marcel Fässler | 4 | All; All; 1-2, 12 | DAY; 1 | SEB; 1 | LBH; 2 | LGA; 7 | WGL; 4 | MOS; 2 | LIM; 1 | ELK; 1 | VIR; 9 | COA; 5 | ATL; 3 | 345 | 1st |
| 2017 | (United States) Corvette Racing | GTLM | (Spain) Antonio García (Denmark) Jan Magnussen (Germany) Mike Rockenfeller | 3 | All; All; 1-2, 12 | DAY; 4 | SEB; 1 | **LBH**; **5** | COA; 1 | WGL; 3 | MOS; 4 | LIM; 4 | ELK; 4 | VIR; 1 | LGA; 4 | ATL; 2 | 344 | 1st |
| 2017 | (United States) Corvette Racing | GTLM | (United Kingdom) Oliver Gavin (United States) Tommy Milner (Switzerland) Marcel Fässler | 4 | All; All; 1-2, 12 | DAY; 9 | SEB; 10 | LBH; 1 | COA; 7 | WGL; 5 | MOS; 8 | LIM; 8 | ELK; 5 | VIR; 6 | LGA; 9 | ATL; 4 | 276 | 8th |
| 2018 | (United States) Corvette Racing | GTLM | (Spain) Antonio García (Denmark) Jan Magnussen (Germany) Mike Rockenfeller (Switzerland) Marcel Fässler | 3 | All; All; 1-2; 12 | **DAY**; **3** | SEB; 8 | LBH; 4 | MOH; 3 | WGL; 2 | MOS; 2 | **LIM**; **2** | ELK; 3 | VIR; 2 | LGA; 3 | ATL; 8 | 322 | 1st |
| 2018 | (United States) Corvette Racing | GTLM | (United Kingdom) Oliver Gavin (United States) Tommy Milner (Switzerland) Marcel Fässler | 4 | All; All; 1-2, 12 | DAY; 4 | SEB; 6 | LBH; 1 | MOH; 8 | WGL; 5 | MOS; 3 | LIM; 4 | ELK; 2 | VIR; 6 | **LGA**; **5** | ATL; 2 | 310 | 3rd |
| 2019 | (United States) Corvette Racing | GTLM | (Spain) Antonio García (Denmark) Jan Magnussen (Germany) Mike Rockenfeller | 3 | All; All; 1-2, 12 | DAY; 6 | SEB; 3 | LBH; 2 | MOH; 2 | **WGL**; **2** | MOS; 7 | LIM; 5 | **ELK**; **4** | VIR; 3 | LGA; 3 | ATL; 4 | 317 | 3rd |
| 2019 | (United States) Corvette Racing | GTLM | (United Kingdom) Oliver Gavin (United States) Tommy Milner (Switzerland) Marcel Fässler | 4 | All; 1-4, 6, 9-12; 1-2, 7-8, 12 | DAY; 8 | SEB; 8 | LBH; 3 | MOH; 8 | WGL; 8 | MOS; 8 | LIM; 6 | ELK; 6 | VIR; 4 | LGA; 4 | ATL; 7 | 275 | 8th |

=== Complete World Endurance Championship results ===
(key) Races in bold indicates pole position. Races in italics indicates fastest lap.

Complete FIA World Endurance Championship results
| Year | Entrant | Class | Drivers | No. | Rds. | Rounds | | | | | | | | | Pts. | Pos. |
| Year | Entrant | Class | Drivers | No. | Rds. | 1 | 2 | 3 | 4 | 5 | 6 | 7 | 8 | 9 | Pts. | Pos. |
|---|---|---|---|---|---|---|---|---|---|---|---|---|---|---|---|---|
| 2014 | (United States) Corvette Racing | LMGTE Pro | (United States) Tommy Milner (United States) Ricky Taylor (United States) Jordan Taylor | 65 | 4; 4; 4 | SIL | SPA | LMS | COA; 7 | FUJ | SHA | BHR | SÃO | | 0 | NC |
| 2014 | (United States) Corvette Racing | LMGTE Pro | (Denmark) Jan Magnussen (Spain) Antonio García (United States) Jordan Taylor | 73 | 3; 3; 3 | SIL | SPA | LMS; 2 | COA | FUJ | SHA | BHR | SÃO | | 0 | NC |
| 2014 | (United States) Corvette Racing | LMGTE Pro | (United States) Tommy Milner (United Kingdom) Oliver Gavin (United Kingdom) Richard Westbrook | 74 | 3; 3; 3 | SIL | SPA | LMS; 4 | COA | FUJ | SHA | BHR | SÃO | | 0 | NC |
| 2015 | (United States) Corvette Racing – GM | LMGTE Pro | (Denmark) Jan Magnussen (Spain) Antonio García (Australia) Ryan Briscoe | 63 | 3; 3; 3 | SIL | SPA | LMS; WD | NÜR | COA | FUJ | SHA | BHR | | 0 | NC |
| 2015 | (United States) Corvette Racing – GM | LMGTE Pro | (United Kingdom) Oliver Gavin (United States) Tommy Milner (United States) Jordan Taylor | 64 | 3; 3; 3 | SIL | SPA | LMS; 1 | NÜR | COA | FUJ | SHA | BHR | | 0 | NC |
| 2015 | (France) Larbre Compétition | LMGTE Am | (Italy) Gianluca Roda (Italy) Paolo Ruberti (Denmark) Kristian Poulsen (Denmark) Nicolai Sylvest | 50 | All; All; 1-5, 8; 6-7 | SIL; 7 | SPA; Ret | LMS; Ret | NÜR; 5 | COA; 7 | FUJ; 4 | SHA; 5 | BHR; 6 | | 52 | 7th |
| 2016 | (United States) Corvette Racing – GM | LMGTE Pro | (Denmark) Jan Magnussen (Spain) Antonio García (United States) Ricky Taylor | 63 | 3; 3; 3 | SIL | SPA | LMS; 7 | NÜR | MEX | COA | FUJ | SHA | BHR | 0 | NC |
| 2016 | (United States) Corvette Racing – GM | LMGTE Pro | (United Kingdom) Oliver Gavin (United States) Tommy Milner (United States) Jordan Taylor | 64 | 3; 3; 3 | SIL | SPA | LMS; Ret | NÜR | MEX | COA | FUJ | SHA | BHR | 0 | NC |
| 2016 | (France) Larbre Compétition | LMGTE Am | (France) Pierre Ragues (Japan) Yutaka Yamagishi (Italy) Paolo Ruberti (France) Jean-Philippe Belloc (United States) Ricky Taylor (United Kingdom) Lars Viljoen (France) Romain Brandela | 50 | All; 1-5, 8; 1-2, 4; 3; 5-9; 6; 8-9 | SIL; 3 | SPA; 3 | LMS; 8 | NÜR; 3 | MEX; Ret | COA; 3 | FUJ; 6 | SHA; 5 | BHR; 5 | 112 | 5th |
| 2016 | (Taiwan) Team AAI | LMGTE Am | (United States) Johnny O'Connell (United States) Mark Patterson (United Kingdom) Oliver Bryant | 57 | 3; 3; 3 | SIL | SPA | LMS; 9 | NÜR | MEX | COA | FUJ | SHA | BHR | 0 | NC |
| 2017 | (United States) Corvette Racing – GM | LMGTE Pro | (Denmark) Jan Magnussen (Spain) Antonio García (United States) Jordan Taylor | 63 | 3; 3; 3 | SIL | SPA | LMS; 3 | NÜR | MEX | COA | FUJ | SHA | BHR | 0 | NC |
| 2017 | (United States) Corvette Racing – GM | LMGTE Pro | (United Kingdom) Oliver Gavin (United States) Tommy Milner (Switzerland) Marcel Fässler | 64 | 3; 3; 3 | SIL | SPA | LMS; 8 | NÜR | MEX | COA | FUJ | SHA | BHR | 0 | NC |
| 2017 | (France) Larbre Compétition | LMGTE Am | (France) Romain Brandela (France) Christian Philippon (Brazil) Fernando Rees | 50 | 3; 3; 3 | SIL | SPA | **LMS**; **15** | NÜR | MEX | COA | FUJ | SHA | BHR | 0 | NC |
| 2018-19 | (United States) Corvette Racing | LMGTE Pro | (Denmark) Jan Magnussen (Spain) Antonio García (Germany) Mike Rockenfeller | 63 | 2, 6, 8; 2, 6, 8; 2, 6, 8 | SPA | LMS; 4 | SIL | FUJ | SHA | SEB; 8 | SPA | LMS; 8 | | 0 | NC |
| 2018-19 | (United States) Corvette Racing | LMGTE Pro | (United Kingdom) Oliver Gavin (United States) Tommy Milner (Switzerland) Marcel Fässler | 64 | 2 4, 8; 2, 4, 8; 2, 8 | SPA | LMS; Ret | SIL | FUJ | SHA; 8 | SEB | SPA | LMS; Ret | | 0 | NC |

=== Complete European Le Mans Series results ===
(key) Races in bold indicates pole position. Races in italics indicates fastest lap.

Complete European Le Mans Series results
| Year | Entrant | Class | Drivers | No. | Rds. | Rounds | | | | | | Pts. | Pos. |
| Year | Entrant | Class | Drivers | No. | Rds. | 1 | 2 | 3 | 4 | 5 | 6 | 8 | 7th |
|---|---|---|---|---|---|---|---|---|---|---|---|---|---|
| 2017 | (France) Larbre Compétition | LMGTE | (France) Romain Brandela (France) Christian Philippon (Brazil) Fernando Rees | 50 | 2; 2; 2 | SIL | MNZ; 6 | RBR | LEC | SPA | POR | 8 | 7th |

== Gallery ==
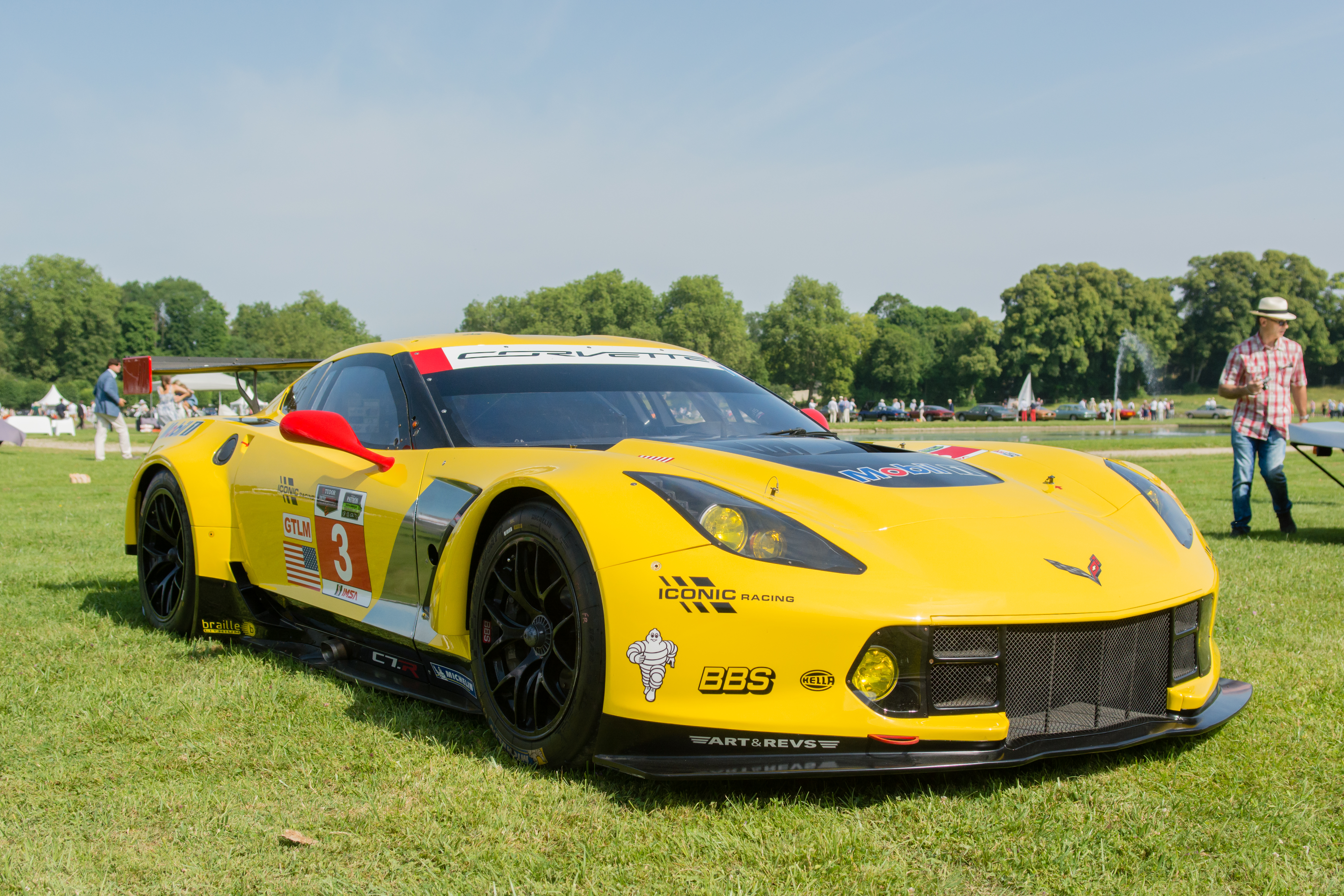
At the 2019 Chantilly Concours d'Elegance

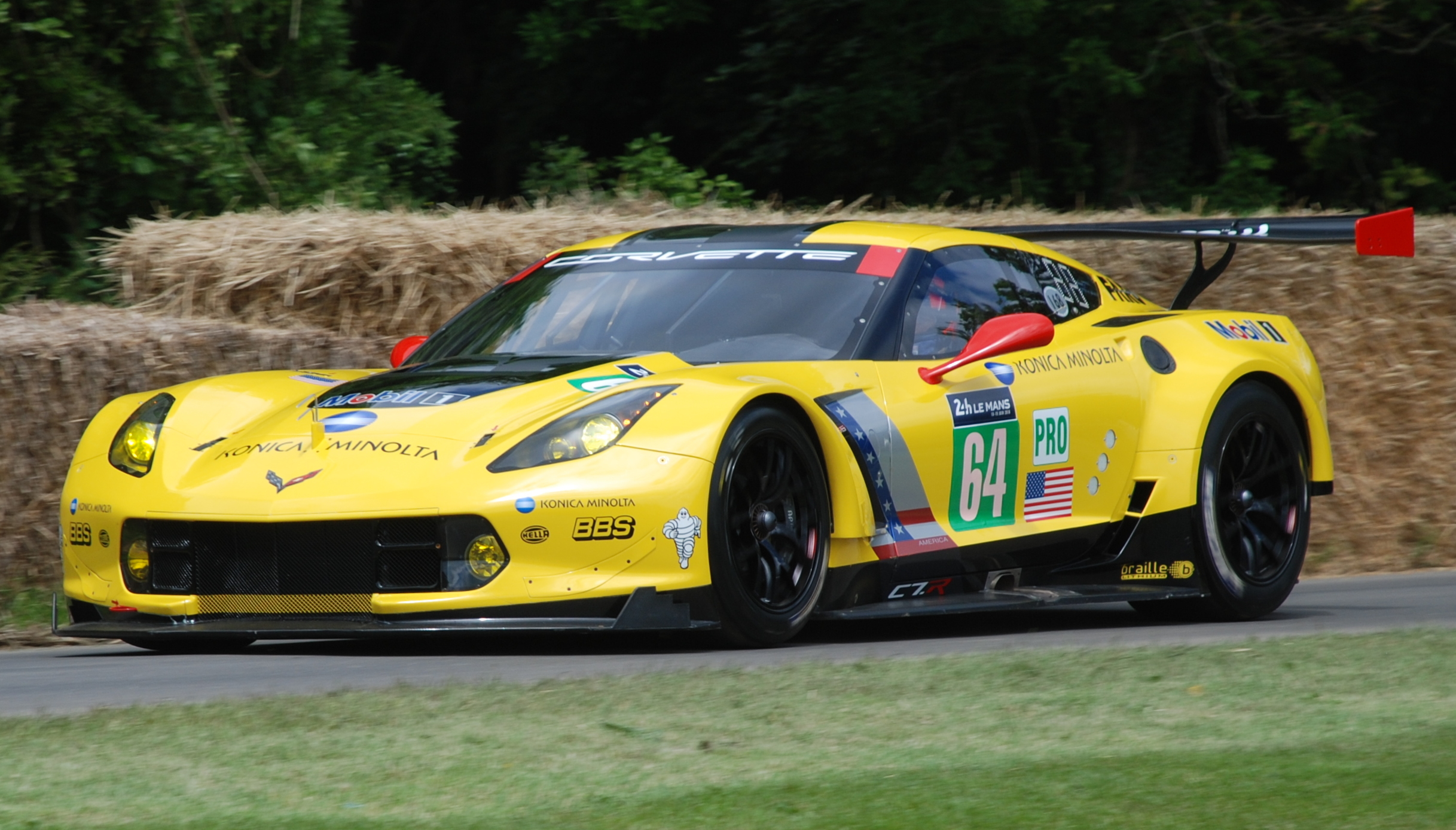
The Chevrolet Corvette C7.R at the 2016 Goodwood Festival of Speed

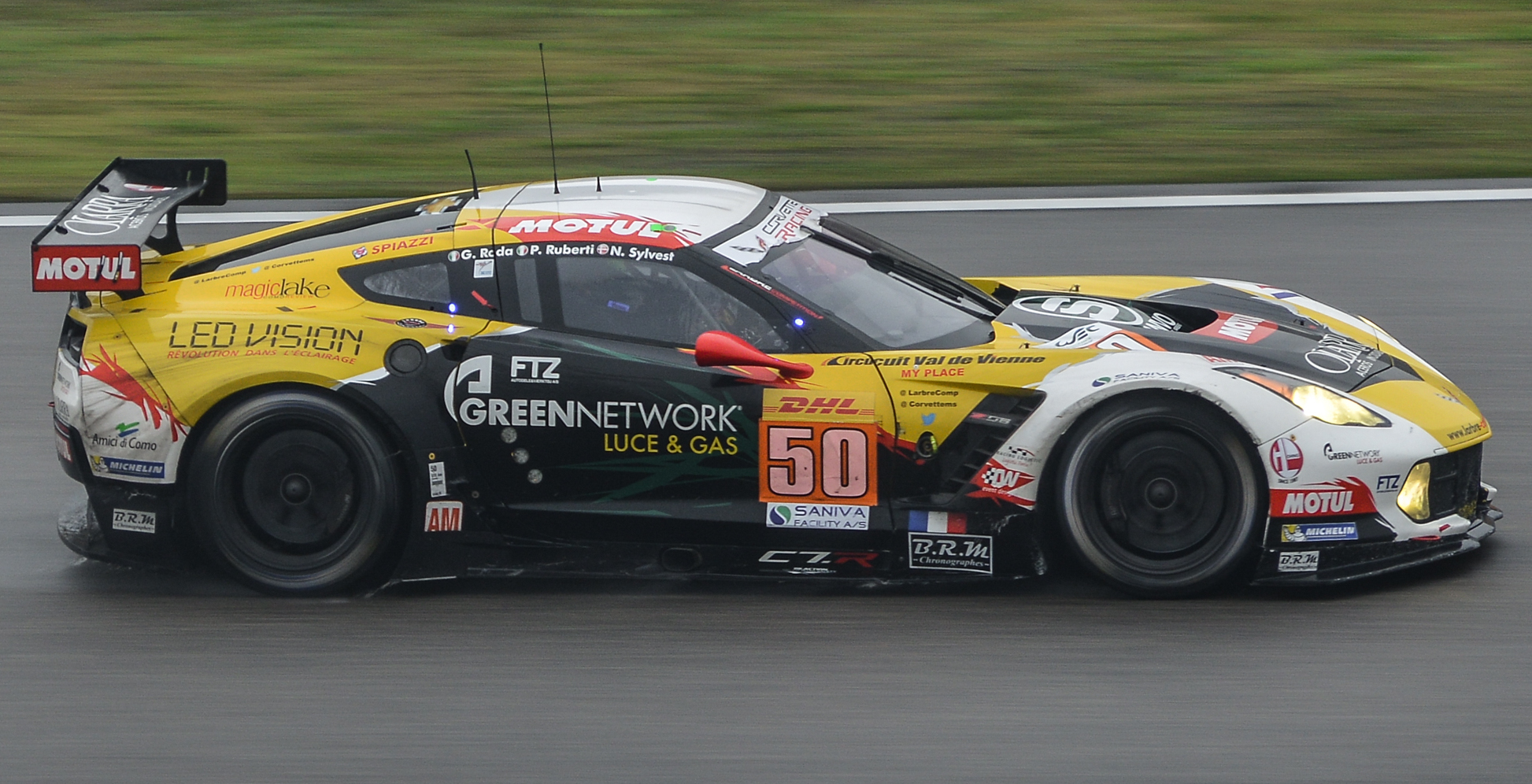
The Chevrolet Corvette C7.R at the 2015 6 Hours of Shanghai.

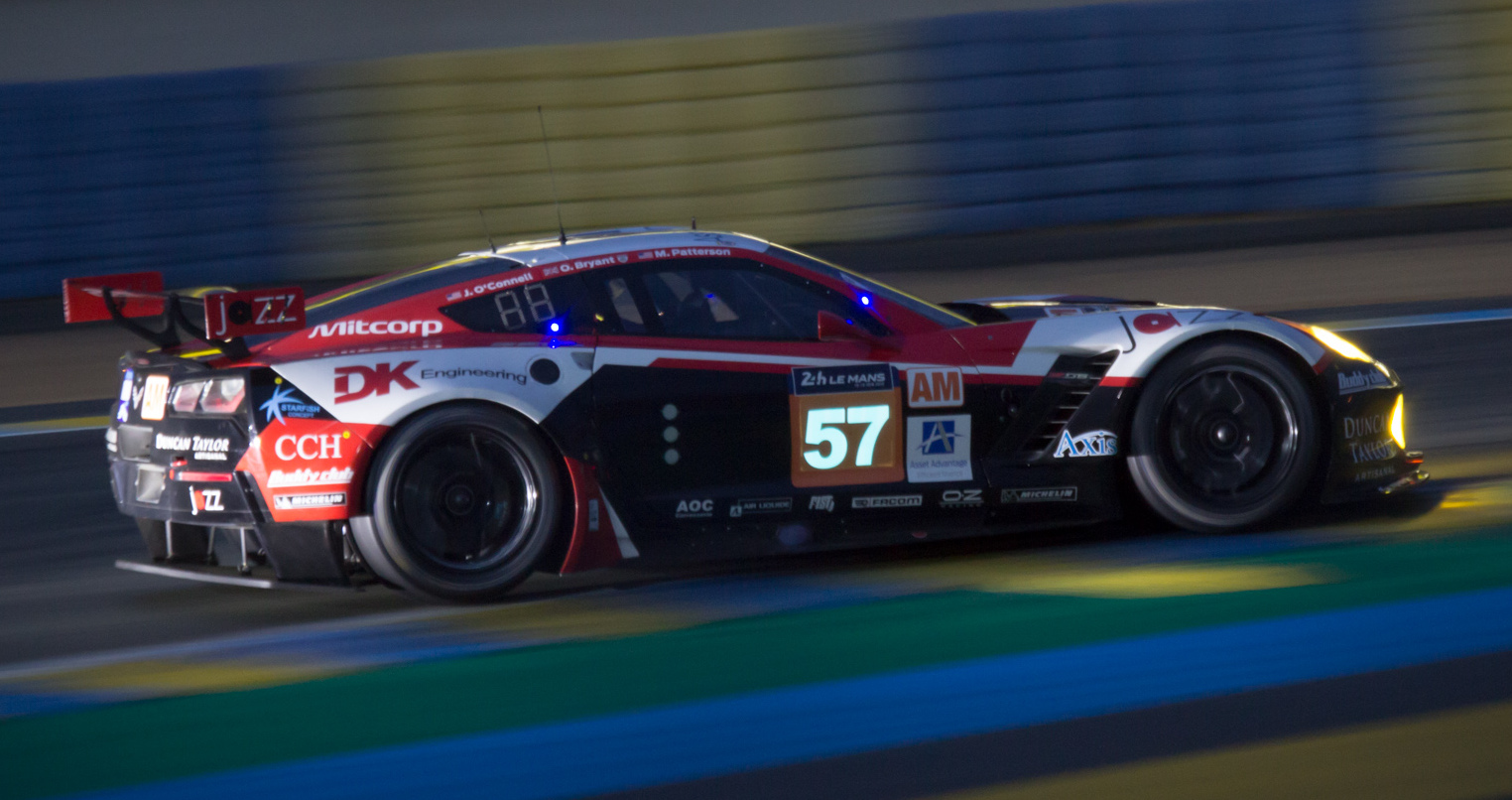
The Chevrolet Corvette C7.R at the 2016 24 Hours of Le Mans
