= 2015 6 Hours of Bahrain =

Endurance sports car race

Coordinates: 26°1′57″N 50°30′38″E

Event information
- Round 8 of 8 in the 2015 FIA World Endurance Championship
- Date: 21 November 2015
- Location: Sakhir
- Venue: Bahrain International Circuit
- Duration: 6 Hours

Results
- Laps completed: 199
- Distance (km): 1076.988
- Distance (miles): 669.237
- LMP1

Pole position
- Time: 1:39.736
- Team: (Germany) Porsche Team

Winners
- Team: (Germany) Porsche Team
- Drivers: (France) Romain Dumas (Switzerland) Neel Jani (Germany) Marc Lieb
- LMP2

Winners
- Team: (Russia) G-Drive Racing
- Drivers: (United Kingdom) Sam Bird (France) Julien Canal (Russia) Roman Rusinov
- LMGTE Pro

Winners
- Team: (Germany) Porsche Team Manthey
- Drivers: (France) Patrick Pilet (France) Frédéric Makowiecki
- LMGTE Am

Winners
- Team: (United Kingdom) Aston Martin Racing
- Drivers: (Canada) Paul Dalla Lana (Portugal) Pedro Lamy (Austria) Mathias Lauda

The 2015 6 Hours of Bahrain was an endurance sports car racing event held on the Grand Prix Circuit of the Bahrain International Circuit, Sakhir, Bahrain on 19–21 November 2015, and served as the eighth and last race of the 2015 FIA World Endurance Championship season. Porsche's Marc Lieb, Romain Dumas and Neel Jani won the race driving the No. 18 Porsche 919 Hybrid car.

== Qualifying ==
=== Qualifying result ===
Pole position winners in each class are marked in bold.

Pos	Class	Team	Time	Grid
1	**LMP1**	**No. 17 Porsche Team**	**1:39.736**	**1**
2	LMP1	No. 18 Porsche Team	1:40.100	2
3	LMP1	No. 7 Audi Sport Team Joest	1:41.303	3
4	LMP1	No. 8 Audi Sport Team Joest	1:41.407	4
5	LMP1	No. 1 Toyota Racing	1:42.158	5
6	LMP1	No. 2 Toyota Racing	1:42.462	6
7	LMP1	No. 13 Rebellion Racing	1:46.660	7
8	LMP1	No. 12 Rebellion Racing	1:46.918	8
9	LMP1	No. 4 Team ByKolles	1:48.281	9
10	**LMP2**	**No. 36 Signatech Alpine**	**1:49.993**	**10**
11	LMP2	No. 26 G-Drive Racing	1:50.102	11
12	LMP2	No. 47 KCMG	1:50.490	12
13	LMP2	No. 28 G-Drive Racing	1:50.720	13
14	LMP2	No. 43 Team SARD Morand	1:51.302	14
15	LMP2	No. 30 Extreme Speed Motorsports	1:51.610	15
16	LMP2	No. 44 AF Racing	1:52.020	16
17	LMP2	No. 42 Strakka Racing	1:52.260	17
18	LMP2	No. 31 Extreme Speed Motorsports	1:55.472	18
19	**LMGTE Pro**	**No. 51 AF Corse**	**1:58.347**	**19**
20	LMGTE Pro	No. 95 Aston Martin Racing	1:58.659	20
21	LMGTE Pro	No. 99 Aston Martin Racing V8	1:58.777	21
22	LMGTE Pro	No. 92 Porsche Team Manthey	1:58.988	22
23	LMGTE Pro	No. 97 Aston Martin Racing	1:59.111	23
24	LMGTE Pro	No. 91 Porsche Team Manthey	1:59.807	24
25	**LMGTE Am**	**No. 98 Aston Martin Racing**	**2:00.522**	**25**
26	LMGTE Am	No. 50 Larbre Compétition	2:00.944	26
27	LMGTE Am	No. 72 SMP Racing	2:00.988	27
28	LMGTE Am	No. 83 AF Corse	2:01.796	28
29	LMGTE Am	No. 77 Dempsey Racing-Proton	2:02.348	29
30	LMGTE Am	No. 96 Aston Martin Racing	2:03.517	30
31	LMGTE Pro	No. 71 AF Corse	2:04.574	31
—	LMGTE Am	No. 88 Abu Dhabi-Proton Racing	No Time	32

== Race ==
=== Race result ===
Class winners in bold.

Pos	Class	No	Team	Drivers	Chassis	Tyre	Laps
Pos	Class	No	Team	Drivers	Engine	Tyre	Laps
1	**LMP1**	**18**	**(Germany) Porsche Team**	**(Germany) Marc Lieb (France) Romain Dumas (Switzerland) Neel Jani**	**Porsche 919 Hybrid**	M	**199**
1	**LMP1**	**18**	**(Germany) Porsche Team**	**(Germany) Marc Lieb (France) Romain Dumas (Switzerland) Neel Jani**	**Porsche 2.0 L Turbo V4**	M	**199**
2	LMP1	7	(Germany) Audi Sport Team Joest	(Germany) André Lotterer (Switzerland) Marcel Fässler (France) Benoît Tréluyer	Audi R18 e-tron quattro	M	199
2	LMP1	7	(Germany) Audi Sport Team Joest	(Germany) André Lotterer (Switzerland) Marcel Fässler (France) Benoît Tréluyer	Audi TDI 4.0 L Turbo Diesel V6	M	199
3	LMP1	2	(Japan) Toyota Racing	(Austria) Alexander Wurz (France) Stéphane Sarrazin (United Kingdom) Mike Conway	Toyota TS040 Hybrid	M	196
3	LMP1	2	(Japan) Toyota Racing	(Austria) Alexander Wurz (France) Stéphane Sarrazin (United Kingdom) Mike Conway	Toyota 3.7 L V8	M	196
4	LMP1	1	(Japan) Toyota Racing	(United Kingdom) Anthony Davidson (Switzerland) Sébastien Buemi (Japan) Kazuki Nakajima	Toyota TS040 Hybrid	M	196
4	LMP1	1	(Japan) Toyota Racing	(United Kingdom) Anthony Davidson (Switzerland) Sébastien Buemi (Japan) Kazuki Nakajima	Toyota 3.7 L V8	M	196
5	LMP1	17	(Germany) Porsche Team	(Germany) Timo Bernhard (New Zealand) Brendon Hartley (Australia) Mark Webber	Porsche 919 Hybrid	M	190
5	LMP1	17	(Germany) Porsche Team	(Germany) Timo Bernhard (New Zealand) Brendon Hartley (Australia) Mark Webber	Porsche 2.0 L Turbo V4	M	190
6	LMP1	8	(Germany) Audi Sport Team Joest	(France) Loïc Duval (Brazil) Lucas di Grassi (United Kingdom) Oliver Jarvis	Audi R18 e-tron quattro	M	188
6	LMP1	8	(Germany) Audi Sport Team Joest	(France) Loïc Duval (Brazil) Lucas di Grassi (United Kingdom) Oliver Jarvis	Audi TDI 4.0 L Turbo Diesel V6	M	188
7	**LMP2**	**26**	**(Russia) G-Drive Racing**	**(Russia) Roman Rusinov (France) Julien Canal (United Kingdom) Sam Bird**	**Ligier JS P2**	D	**183**
7	**LMP2**	**26**	**(Russia) G-Drive Racing**	**(Russia) Roman Rusinov (France) Julien Canal (United Kingdom) Sam Bird**	**Nissan VK45DE 4.5 L V8**	D	**183**
8	LMP2	47	(Hong Kong) KCMG	(United Kingdom) Matthew Howson (United Kingdom) Richard Bradley (United Kingdom) Nick Tandy	Oreca 05	D	183
8	LMP2	47	(Hong Kong) KCMG	(United Kingdom) Matthew Howson (United Kingdom) Richard Bradley (United Kingdom) Nick Tandy	Nissan VK45DE 4.5 L V8	D	183
9	LMP2	28	(Russia) G-Drive Racing	(Colombia) Gustavo Yacamán (Mexico) Ricardo González (Brazil) Pipo Derani	Ligier JS P2	D	182
9	LMP2	28	(Russia) G-Drive Racing	(Colombia) Gustavo Yacamán (Mexico) Ricardo González (Brazil) Pipo Derani	Nissan VK45DE 4.5 L V8	D	182
10	LMP2	36	(France) Signatech Alpine	(France) Nelson Panciatici (France) Paul-Loup Chatin (France) Tom Dillmann	Alpine A450b	D	182
10	LMP2	36	(France) Signatech Alpine	(France) Nelson Panciatici (France) Paul-Loup Chatin (France) Tom Dillmann	Nissan VK45DE 4.5 L V8	D	182
11	LMP1	13	(Switzerland) Rebellion Racing	(Switzerland) Alexandre Imperatori (Austria) Dominik Kraihamer (Switzerland) Mathéo Tuscher	Rebellion R-One	M	181
11	LMP1	13	(Switzerland) Rebellion Racing	(Switzerland) Alexandre Imperatori (Austria) Dominik Kraihamer (Switzerland) Mathéo Tuscher	AER P60 2.4 L Turbo V6	M	181
12	LMP1	4	(Austria) Team ByKolles	(Switzerland) Simon Trummer (Germany) Pierre Kaffer	CLM P1/01	M	180
12	LMP1	4	(Austria) Team ByKolles	(Switzerland) Simon Trummer (Germany) Pierre Kaffer	AER P60 2.4 L Turbo V6	M	180
13	LMP2	44	(Russia) AF Racing	(France) Nicolas Minassian (Russia) Mikhail Aleshin (Russia) David Markozov	BR Engineering BR01	D	179
13	LMP2	44	(Russia) AF Racing	(France) Nicolas Minassian (Russia) Mikhail Aleshin (Russia) David Markozov	Nissan VK45DE 4.5 L V8	D	179
14	LMP1	12	(Switzerland) Rebellion Racing	(France) Nicolas Prost (Switzerland) Mathias Beche	Rebellion R-One	M	179
14	LMP1	12	(Switzerland) Rebellion Racing	(France) Nicolas Prost (Switzerland) Mathias Beche	AER P60 2.4 L Turbo V6	M	179
15	LMP2	42	(United Kingdom) Strakka Racing	(United Kingdom) Nick Leventis (United Kingdom) Jonny Kane (United Kingdom) Danny Watts	Gibson 015S	D	178
15	LMP2	42	(United Kingdom) Strakka Racing	(United Kingdom) Nick Leventis (United Kingdom) Jonny Kane (United Kingdom) Danny Watts	Nissan VK45DE 4.5 L V8	D	178
16	LMP2	43	(Switzerland) Team SARD Morand	(United Kingdom) Oliver Webb (France) Pierre Ragues (Canada) Chris Cumming	Morgan LMP2 Evo	D	177
16	LMP2	43	(Switzerland) Team SARD Morand	(United Kingdom) Oliver Webb (France) Pierre Ragues (Canada) Chris Cumming	SARD 3.6 L V8	D	177
17	LMP2	30	(United States) Extreme Speed Motorsports	(United States) Scott Sharp (United Kingdom) Ryan Dalziel (Denmark) David Heinemeier Hansson	Ligier JS P2	D	176
17	LMP2	30	(United States) Extreme Speed Motorsports	(United States) Scott Sharp (United Kingdom) Ryan Dalziel (Denmark) David Heinemeier Hansson	Honda HR28TT 2.8 L Turbo V6	D	176
18	**LMGTE; Pro**	**92**	**(Germany) Porsche Team Manthey**	**(France) Patrick Pilet (France) Frédéric Makowiecki**	**Porsche 911 RSR**	M	**173**
18	**LMGTE; Pro**	**92**	**(Germany) Porsche Team Manthey**	**(France) Patrick Pilet (France) Frédéric Makowiecki**	**Porsche 4.0 L Flat-6**	M	**173**
19	LMGTE; Pro	51	(Italy) AF Corse	(Italy) Gianmaria Bruni (Finland) Toni Vilander	Ferrari 458 Italia GT2	M	173
19	LMGTE; Pro	51	(Italy) AF Corse	(Italy) Gianmaria Bruni (Finland) Toni Vilander	Ferrari 4.5 L V8	M	173
20	LMP2	31	(United States) Extreme Speed Motorsports	(United States) Ed Brown (United States) Johannes van Overbeek (United States) Jon Fogarty	Ligier JS P2	D	173
20	LMP2	31	(United States) Extreme Speed Motorsports	(United States) Ed Brown (United States) Johannes van Overbeek (United States) Jon Fogarty	Honda HR28TT 2.8 L Turbo V6	D	173
21	LMGTE; Pro	97	(United Kingdom) Aston Martin Racing	(United Kingdom) Darren Turner (United Kingdom) Jonathan Adam	Aston Martin V8 Vantage GTE	M	173
21	LMGTE; Pro	97	(United Kingdom) Aston Martin Racing	(United Kingdom) Darren Turner (United Kingdom) Jonathan Adam	Aston Martin 4.5 L V8	M	173
22	LMGTE; Pro	95	(United Kingdom) Aston Martin Racing	(Denmark) Christoffer Nygaard (Denmark) Marco Sørensen (Denmark) Nicki Thiim	Aston Martin V8 Vantage GTE	M	173
22	LMGTE; Pro	95	(United Kingdom) Aston Martin Racing	(Denmark) Christoffer Nygaard (Denmark) Marco Sørensen (Denmark) Nicki Thiim	Aston Martin 4.5 L V8	M	173
23	LMGTE; Pro	91	(Germany) Porsche Team Manthey	(Denmark) Michael Christensen (Austria) Richard Lietz	Porsche 911 RSR	M	172
23	LMGTE; Pro	91	(Germany) Porsche Team Manthey	(Denmark) Michael Christensen (Austria) Richard Lietz	Porsche 4.0 L Flat-6	M	172
24	LMGTE; Pro	71	(Italy) AF Corse	(Italy) Davide Rigon (United Kingdom) James Calado	Ferrari 458 Italia GT2	M	172
24	LMGTE; Pro	71	(Italy) AF Corse	(Italy) Davide Rigon (United Kingdom) James Calado	Ferrari 4.5 L V8	M	172
25	LMGTE; Pro	99	(United Kingdom) Aston Martin Racing V8	(Brazil) Fernando Rees (United Kingdom) Alex MacDowall (New Zealand) Richie Stanaway	Aston Martin V8 Vantage GTE	M	171
25	LMGTE; Pro	99	(United Kingdom) Aston Martin Racing V8	(Brazil) Fernando Rees (United Kingdom) Alex MacDowall (New Zealand) Richie Stanaway	Aston Martin 4.5 L V8	M	171
26	**LMGTE; Am**	**98**	**(United Kingdom) Aston Martin Racing**	**(Canada) Paul Dalla Lana (Portugal) Pedro Lamy (Austria) Mathias Lauda**	**Aston Martin V8 Vantage GTE**	M	**170**
26	**LMGTE; Am**	**98**	**(United Kingdom) Aston Martin Racing**	**(Canada) Paul Dalla Lana (Portugal) Pedro Lamy (Austria) Mathias Lauda**	**Aston Martin 4.5 L V8**	M	**170**
27	LMGTE; Am	88	(Germany) Abu Dhabi-Proton Racing	(Italy) Marco Mapelli (Austria) Klaus Bachler (United Arab Emirates) Khaled Al Qubaisi	Porsche 911 RSR	M	170
27	LMGTE; Am	88	(Germany) Abu Dhabi-Proton Racing	(Italy) Marco Mapelli (Austria) Klaus Bachler (United Arab Emirates) Khaled Al Qubaisi	Porsche 4.0 L Flat-6	M	170
28	LMGTE; Am	77	(Germany) Dempsey Racing-Proton	(Germany) Christian Ried (United States) Patrick Long (Germany) Marco Seefried	Porsche 911 RSR	M	170
28	LMGTE; Am	77	(Germany) Dempsey Racing-Proton	(Germany) Christian Ried (United States) Patrick Long (Germany) Marco Seefried	Porsche 4.0 L Flat-6	M	170
29	LMGTE; Am	83	(Italy) AF Corse	(France) François Perrodo (France) Emmanuel Collard (Italy) Matteo Cressoni	Ferrari 458 Italia GT2	M	169
29	LMGTE; Am	83	(Italy) AF Corse	(France) François Perrodo (France) Emmanuel Collard (Italy) Matteo Cressoni	Ferrari 4.5 L V8	M	169
30	LMGTE; Am	72	(Russia) SMP Racing	(Russia) Viktor Shaitar (Russia) Aleksey Basov (Italy) Andrea Bertolini	Ferrari 458 Italia GT2	M	169
30	LMGTE; Am	72	(Russia) SMP Racing	(Russia) Viktor Shaitar (Russia) Aleksey Basov (Italy) Andrea Bertolini	Ferrari 4.5 L V8	M	169
31	LMGTE; Am	50	(France) Larbre Compétition	(Italy) Gianluca Roda (Italy) Paolo Ruberti (Denmark) Kristian Poulsen	Chevrolet Corvette C7.R	M	169
31	LMGTE; Am	50	(France) Larbre Compétition	(Italy) Gianluca Roda (Italy) Paolo Ruberti (Denmark) Kristian Poulsen	Chevrolet 5.5 L V8	M	169
32	LMGTE; Am	96	(United Kingdom) Aston Martin Racing	(Germany) Roald Goethe (United Kingdom) Stuart Hall (Italy) Francesco Castellacci	Aston Martin V8 Vantage GTE	M	168
32	LMGTE; Am	96	(United Kingdom) Aston Martin Racing	(Germany) Roald Goethe (United Kingdom) Stuart Hall (Italy) Francesco Castellacci	Aston Martin 4.5 L V8	M	168

== See also ==
- 2015 Bahrain 2nd GP2 Series round
- 2015 Bahrain GP3 Series round

FIA World Endurance Championship
Previous race: 6 Hours of Shanghai	2015 season	Next race: 6 Hours of Silverstone (2016)
