= 2014 6 Hours of Spa-Francorchamps =

Sports car endurance race held at Spa-Francorchamps

The Circuit de Spa-Francorchamps

The 2014 WEC 6 Hours of Spa-Francorchamps, formally known as the WEC 6 Heures de Spa-Francorchamps, was an endurance sports car racing event held at the Circuit de Spa-Francorchamps, Spa, Belgium on 2–3 May 2014. Spa-Francorchamps served as the second race of the 2014 FIA World Endurance Championship. Toyota's Anthony Davidson, Sébastien Buemi, and Nicolas Lapierre led the field to the checkered flag for their second consecutive victory of the season, ahead of Audi and the sister Toyota. The LMP2 category also had its second consecutive winner with G-Drive Racing ahead of Jota Sport's guest entry in the series. AF Corse Ferrari held off Porsche Team Manthey in the LMGTE Pro class, while another AF Corse Ferrari won the LMGTE Am category ahead of two Aston Martins.

== Qualifying ==
=== Qualifying result ===
Pole position winners in each class are marked in bold.

Pos	Class	Team	Average Time	Grid
1	**LMP1-H**	**No. 14 Porsche Team**	**2:01.198**	1
2	LMP1-H	No. 8 Toyota Racing	2:01.836	2
3	LMP1-H	No. 2 Audi Sport Team Joest	2:02.499	3
4	LMP1-H	No. 7 Toyota Racing	2:03.177	4
5	LMP1-H	No. 20 Porsche Team	2:03.672	5
6	LMP1-H	No. 1 Audi Sport Team Joest	2:03.881	6
7	LMP1-H	No. 3 Audi Sport Team Joest	2:06.160	7
8	**LMP2**	**No. 47 KCMG**	**2:12.103**	8
9	LMP2	No. 27 SMP Racing	2:12.751	9
10	LMP2	No. 26 G-Drive Racing	2:13.143	10
11	LMP2	No. 38 Jota Sport	2:13.761	11
12	**LMP1-L**	**No. 12 Rebellion Racing**	**2:14.934**	12
13	**LMGTE Pro**	**No. 51 AF Corse**	**2:32.338**	14
14	LMGTE Pro	No. 97 Aston Martin Racing	2:32.505	15
15	LMGTE Pro	No. 92 Porsche Team Manthey	2:32.581	16
16	LMGTE Pro	No. 91 Porsche Team Manthey	2:32.817	17
17	LMGTE Pro	No. 99 Aston Martin Racing	2:33.070	18
18	LMGTE Pro	No. 71 AF Corse	2:33.572	19
19	**LMGTE Am**	**No. 61 AF Corse**	**2:33.962**	20
20	LMGTE Am	No. 75 Prospeed Competition	2:33.981	21
21	LMGTE Am	No. 81 AF Corse	2:34.039	22
22	LMGTE Am	No. 88 Proton Competition	2:34.828	23
23	LMGTE Am	No. 90 8 Star Motorsports	2:35.348	24
24	LMGTE Am	No. 60 AF Corse	2:35.641	25
25	LMGTE Am	No. 98 Aston Martin Racing	2:39.390	26
26	LMGTE Am	No. 95 Aston Martin Racing	2:39.404	27
–	LMP2	No. 37 SMP Racing	No Time	13^{1}
–	LMP1-L	No. 13 Rebellion Racing	No Time	–

^1 – The No. 37 SMP Racing Oreca-Nissan was allowed to grid at the back of the LMP field.

== Race ==
=== Race result ===
Class winners in bold.

Pos	Class	No	Team	Drivers	Chassis	Tyre	Laps
Pos	Class	No	Team	Drivers	Engine	Tyre	Laps
1	**LMP1-H**	**8**	**(Japan) Toyota Racing**	**(United Kingdom) Anthony Davidson (Switzerland) Sébastien Buemi (France) Nicolas Lapierre**	**Toyota TS040 Hybrid**	MI	**171**
1	**LMP1-H**	**8**	**(Japan) Toyota Racing**	**(United Kingdom) Anthony Davidson (Switzerland) Sébastien Buemi (France) Nicolas Lapierre**	**Toyota 3.7 L V8**	MI	**171**
2	LMP1-H	1	(Germany) Audi Sport Team Joest	(Denmark) Tom Kristensen (France) Loïc Duval (Brazil) Lucas di Grassi	Audi R18 e-tron quattro	MI	171
2	LMP1-H	1	(Germany) Audi Sport Team Joest	(Denmark) Tom Kristensen (France) Loïc Duval (Brazil) Lucas di Grassi	Audi TDI 4.0 L Turbo V6 (Diesel)	MI	171
3	LMP1-H	7	(Japan) Toyota Racing	(Austria) Alexander Wurz (France) Stéphane Sarrazin (Japan) Kazuki Nakajima	Toyota TS040 Hybrid	MI	171
3	LMP1-H	7	(Japan) Toyota Racing	(Austria) Alexander Wurz (France) Stéphane Sarrazin (Japan) Kazuki Nakajima	Toyota 3.7 L V8	MI	171
4	LMP1-H	14	(Germany) Porsche Team	(Germany) Marc Lieb (France) Romain Dumas (Switzerland) Neel Jani	Porsche 919 Hybrid	MI	170
4	LMP1-H	14	(Germany) Porsche Team	(Germany) Marc Lieb (France) Romain Dumas (Switzerland) Neel Jani	Porsche 2.0 L Turbo V4	MI	170
5	LMP1-H	2	(Germany) Audi Sport Team Joest	(Germany) André Lotterer (Switzerland) Marcel Fässler (France) Benoît Tréluyer	Audi R18 e-tron quattro	MI	170
5	LMP1-H	2	(Germany) Audi Sport Team Joest	(Germany) André Lotterer (Switzerland) Marcel Fässler (France) Benoît Tréluyer	Audi TDI 4.0 L Turbo V6 (Diesel)	MI	170
6	LMP1-H	3	(Germany) Audi Sport Team Joest	(Portugal) Filipe Albuquerque (Italy) Marco Bonanomi	Audi R18 e-tron quattro	MI	169
6	LMP1-H	3	(Germany) Audi Sport Team Joest	(Portugal) Filipe Albuquerque (Italy) Marco Bonanomi	Audi TDI 4.0 L Turbo V6 (Diesel)	MI	169
7	**LMP1-L**	**12**	**(Switzerland) Rebellion Racing**	**(France) Nicolas Prost (Germany) Nick Heidfeld (Switzerland) Mathias Beche**	**Rebellion R-One**	MI	**161**
7	**LMP1-L**	**12**	**(Switzerland) Rebellion Racing**	**(France) Nicolas Prost (Germany) Nick Heidfeld (Switzerland) Mathias Beche**	**Toyota RV8KLM 3.4 L V8**	MI	**161**
8	**LMP2**	**26**	**(Russia) G-Drive Racing**	**(Russia) Roman Rusinov (France) Olivier Pla (France) Julien Canal**	**Morgan LMP2**	D	**160**
8	**LMP2**	**26**	**(Russia) G-Drive Racing**	**(Russia) Roman Rusinov (France) Olivier Pla (France) Julien Canal**	**Nissan VK45DE 4.5 L V8**	D	**160**
9	LMP2	38	(United Kingdom) Jota Sport	(United Kingdom) Simon Dolan (United Kingdom) Harry Tincknell (Spain) Marc Gené	Zytek Z11SN	D	160
9	LMP2	38	(United Kingdom) Jota Sport	(United Kingdom) Simon Dolan (United Kingdom) Harry Tincknell (Spain) Marc Gené	Nissan VK45DE 4.5 L V8	D	160
10	LMP2	47	(Hong Kong) KCMG	(United Kingdom) Matthew Howson (United Kingdom) Richard Bradley (Switzerland) Alexandre Imperatori	Oreca 03	D	159
10	LMP2	47	(Hong Kong) KCMG	(United Kingdom) Matthew Howson (United Kingdom) Richard Bradley (Switzerland) Alexandre Imperatori	Nissan VK45DE 4.5 L V8	D	159
11	LMP2	37	(Russia) SMP Racing	(Russia) Kirill Ladygin (Russia) Anton Ladygin (Russia) Viktor Shaitar	Oreca 03	MI	158
11	LMP2	37	(Russia) SMP Racing	(Russia) Kirill Ladygin (Russia) Anton Ladygin (Russia) Viktor Shaitar	Nissan VK45DE 4.5 L V8	MI	158
12	LMP2	27	(Russia) SMP Racing	(Russia) Sergey Zlobin (Italy) Maurizio Mediani (France) Nicolas Minassian	Oreca 03	MI	158
12	LMP2	27	(Russia) SMP Racing	(Russia) Sergey Zlobin (Italy) Maurizio Mediani (France) Nicolas Minassian	Nissan VK45DE 4.5 L V8	MI	158
13	**LMGTE; Pro**	**51**	**(Italy) AF Corse**	**(Italy) Gianmaria Bruni (Finland) Toni Vilander**	**Ferrari 458 Italia GT2**	MI	**152**
13	**LMGTE; Pro**	**51**	**(Italy) AF Corse**	**(Italy) Gianmaria Bruni (Finland) Toni Vilander**	**Ferrari 4.5 L V8**	MI	**152**
14	LMGTE; Pro	91	(Germany) Porsche Team Manthey	(France) Patrick Pilet (Germany) Jörg Bergmeister	Porsche 911 RSR	MI	151
14	LMGTE; Pro	91	(Germany) Porsche Team Manthey	(France) Patrick Pilet (Germany) Jörg Bergmeister	Porsche 4.0 L Flat-6	MI	151
15	LMGTE; Pro	71	(Italy) AF Corse	(Italy) Davide Rigon (United Kingdom) James Calado	Ferrari 458 Italia GT2	MI	151
15	LMGTE; Pro	71	(Italy) AF Corse	(Italy) Davide Rigon (United Kingdom) James Calado	Ferrari 4.5 L V8	MI	151
16	LMGTE; Pro	97	(United Kingdom) Aston Martin Racing	(United Kingdom) Darren Turner (Germany) Stefan Mücke (Brazil) Bruno Senna	Aston Martin V8 Vantage GTE	MI	151
16	LMGTE; Pro	97	(United Kingdom) Aston Martin Racing	(United Kingdom) Darren Turner (Germany) Stefan Mücke (Brazil) Bruno Senna	Aston Martin 4.5 L V8	MI	151
17	LMGTE; Pro	99	(United Kingdom) Aston Martin Racing	(Hong Kong) Darryl O'Young (United Kingdom) Alex MacDowall (Brazil) Fernando Rees	Aston Martin V8 Vantage GTE	MI	150
17	LMGTE; Pro	99	(United Kingdom) Aston Martin Racing	(Hong Kong) Darryl O'Young (United Kingdom) Alex MacDowall (Brazil) Fernando Rees	Aston Martin 4.5 L V8	MI	150
18	**LMGTE; Am**	**61**	**(Italy) AF Corse**	**(Argentina) Luís Pérez Companc (Italy) Marco Cioci (Italy) Mirko Venturi**	**Ferrari 458 Italia GT2**	MI	**149**
18	**LMGTE; Am**	**61**	**(Italy) AF Corse**	**(Argentina) Luís Pérez Companc (Italy) Marco Cioci (Italy) Mirko Venturi**	**Ferrari 4.5 L V8**	MI	**149**
19	LMGTE; Am	95	(United Kingdom) Aston Martin Racing	(Denmark) David Heinemeier Hansson (Denmark) Kristian Poulsen (New Zealand) Richie Stanaway	Aston Martin V8 Vantage GTE	MI	149
19	LMGTE; Am	95	(United Kingdom) Aston Martin Racing	(Denmark) David Heinemeier Hansson (Denmark) Kristian Poulsen (New Zealand) Richie Stanaway	Aston Martin 4.5 L V8	MI	149
20	LMGTE; Am	98	(United Kingdom) Aston Martin Racing	(Canada) Paul Dalla Lana (Portugal) Pedro Lamy (Denmark) Christoffer Nygaard	Aston Martin V8 Vantage GTE	MI	149
20	LMGTE; Am	98	(United Kingdom) Aston Martin Racing	(Canada) Paul Dalla Lana (Portugal) Pedro Lamy (Denmark) Christoffer Nygaard	Aston Martin 4.5 L V8	MI	149
21	LMGTE; Pro	92	(Germany) Porsche Team Manthey	(Germany) Marco Holzer (France) Frédéric Makowiecki	Porsche 911 RSR	MI	148
21	LMGTE; Pro	92	(Germany) Porsche Team Manthey	(Germany) Marco Holzer (France) Frédéric Makowiecki	Porsche 4.0 L Flat-6	MI	148
22	LMGTE; Am	88	(Germany) Proton Competition	(Germany) Christian Ried (Austria) Klaus Bachler (United Arab Emirates) Khaled Al Qubaisi	Porsche 911 RSR	MI	148
22	LMGTE; Am	88	(Germany) Proton Competition	(Germany) Christian Ried (Austria) Klaus Bachler (United Arab Emirates) Khaled Al Qubaisi	Porsche 4.0 L Flat-6	MI	148
23	LMP1-H	20	(Germany) Porsche Team	(Germany) Timo Bernhard (New Zealand) Brendon Hartley (Australia) Mark Webber	Porsche 919 Hybrid	MI	148
23	LMP1-H	20	(Germany) Porsche Team	(Germany) Timo Bernhard (New Zealand) Brendon Hartley (Australia) Mark Webber	Porsche 2.0 L Turbo V4	MI	148
24	LMGTE; Am	81	(Italy) AF Corse	(Australia) Stephen Wyatt (Italy) Michele Rugolo (Italy) Andrea Bertolini	Ferrari 458 Italia GT2	MI	148
24	LMGTE; Am	81	(Italy) AF Corse	(Australia) Stephen Wyatt (Italy) Michele Rugolo (Italy) Andrea Bertolini	Ferrari 4.5 L V8	MI	148
25	LMGTE; Am	75	(Belgium) Prospeed Competition	(France) François Perrodo (France) Matthieu Vaxivière (France) Emmanuel Collard	Porsche 997 GT3-RSR	MI	146
25	LMGTE; Am	75	(Belgium) Prospeed Competition	(France) François Perrodo (France) Matthieu Vaxivière (France) Emmanuel Collard	Porsche 4.0 L Flat-6	MI	146
26	LMGTE; Am	60	(Italy) AF Corse	(United States) Peter Mann (Italy) Raffaele Giammaria (Italy) Lorenzo Casé	Ferrari 458 Italia GT2	MI	145
26	LMGTE; Am	60	(Italy) AF Corse	(United States) Peter Mann (Italy) Raffaele Giammaria (Italy) Lorenzo Casé	Ferrari 4.5 L V8	MI	145
27	LMGTE; Am	90	(United States) 8 Star Motorsports	(Venezuela) Enzo Potolicchio (Italy) Paolo Ruberti (Italy) Gianluca Roda	Ferrari 458 Italia GT2	MI	142
27	LMGTE; Am	90	(United States) 8 Star Motorsports	(Venezuela) Enzo Potolicchio (Italy) Paolo Ruberti (Italy) Gianluca Roda	Ferrari 4.5 L V8	MI	142
DNF	LMP1-L	13	(Switzerland) Rebellion Racing	(Austria) Dominik Kraihamer (Italy) Andrea Belicchi (Switzerland) Fabio Leimer	Rebellion R-One	MI	47
DNF	LMP1-L	13	(Switzerland) Rebellion Racing	(Austria) Dominik Kraihamer (Italy) Andrea Belicchi (Switzerland) Fabio Leimer	Toyota RV8KLM 3.4 L V8	MI	47

FIA World Endurance Championship
Previous race: 6 Hours of Silverstone	2014 season	Next race: 24 Hours of Le Mans
