= 2014 6 Hours of Silverstone =

Sports car endurance race held at Silverstone Circuit, Northamptonshire, England

Map of the Silverstone Grand Prix Circuit

The 2014 6 Hours of Silverstone was an endurance sports car racing event held at the Silverstone Circuit near Silverstone, England on 17–20 April 2014. The event served as the opening round of the 2014 World Endurance Championship, and overall race winners were awarded the annual Tourist Trophy by the Royal Automobile Club. Toyota became the first Japanese manufacturer to win Silverstone's endurance race, with Anthony Davidson, Sébastien Buemi, and Nicolas Lapierre leading the team's second TS040 Hybrid to a 1–2 finish. The race, which had run under mixed weather conditions, was stopped in the final half-hour of competition due to heavy rains and not restarted.

Porsche, making their return to the prototype categories with the debuting 919 Hybrid, completed the overall race podium with third place. Accidents ended the race of both Audi R18 e-tron quattro cars after the World Champions had started strongly. Rebellion Racing's Nicolas Prost, Nick Heidfeld, and Mathias Beche were the only team to reach the finish in the LMP1-L category, while G-Drive Racing's Morgan-Nissan won the LMP2 class. Lock-out 1–2 victories were also earned by Porsche in LMGTE Pro and British marque Aston Martin in LMGTE Am.

== Qualifying results ==
Pole position winners in each class are marked in bold.

Pos	Class	Team	Average Time	Grid
1	**LMP1-H**	**No. 7 Toyota Racing**	**1:42.774**	1
2	LMP1-H	No. 1 Audi Sport Team Joest	1:42.779	2
3	LMP1-H	No. 14 Porsche Team	1:43.087	3
4	LMP1-H	No. 2 Audi Sport Team Joest	1:43.137	4
5	LMP1-H	No. 8 Toyota Racing	1:43.137	5
6	LMP1-H	No. 20 Porsche Team	1:43.226	6
7	**LMP1-L**	**No. 13 Rebellion Racing**	**1:44.285**	7
8	LMP1-L	No. 12 Rebellion Racing	1:44.392	8
9	**LMP2**	**No. 26 G-Drive Racing**	**1:49.156**	9
10	LMP2	No. 47 KCMG	1:49.439	10
11	LMP2	No. 37 SMP Racing	1:51.326	11
12	LMP2	No. 27 SMP Racing	1:51.514	12
13	**LMGTE Pro**	**No. 51 AF Corse**	**1:59.125**	13
14	LMGTE Pro	No. 91 Porsche Team Manthey	1:59.380	14
15	LMGTE Pro	No. 92 Porsche Team Manthey	1:59.717	15
16	LMGTE Pro	No. 71 AF Corse	1:59.841	16
17	**LMGTE Am**	**No. 81 AF Corse**	**1:59.932**	17
18	LMGTE Pro	No. 97 Aston Martin Racing	1:59.954	18
19	LMGTE Pro	No. 52 Ram Racing	2:00.216	19
20	LMGTE Am	No. 98 Aston Martin Racing	2:00.923	20
21	LMGTE Am	No. 61 AF Corse	2:00.971	21
22	LMGTE Am	No. 95 Aston Martin Racing	2:00.982	22
23	LMGTE Pro	No. 99 Aston Martin Racing	2:01.122	23
24	LMGTE Am	No. 75 Prospeed Competition	2:01.886	24
25	LMGTE Am	No. 88 Proton Competition	2:01.917	25
26	LMGTE Am	No. 53 Ram Racing	2:01.953	26
27	LMGTE Am	No. 90 8 Star Motorsports	2:01.982	27

== Race ==
=== Race result ===
Class winners in bold.

Pos	Class	No	Team	Drivers	Chassis	Tyre	Laps
Pos	Class	No	Team	Drivers	Engine	Tyre	Laps
1	**LMP1-H**	**8**	**(Japan) Toyota Racing**	**(United Kingdom) Anthony Davidson (Switzerland) Sébastien Buemi (France) Nicolas Lapierre**	**Toyota TS040 Hybrid**	MI	**167**
1	**LMP1-H**	**8**	**(Japan) Toyota Racing**	**(United Kingdom) Anthony Davidson (Switzerland) Sébastien Buemi (France) Nicolas Lapierre**	**Toyota 3.7 L V8**	MI	**167**
2	LMP1-H	7	(Japan) Toyota Racing	(Austria) Alexander Wurz (France) Stéphane Sarrazin (Japan) Kazuki Nakajima	Toyota TS040 Hybrid	MI	166
2	LMP1-H	7	(Japan) Toyota Racing	(Austria) Alexander Wurz (France) Stéphane Sarrazin (Japan) Kazuki Nakajima	Toyota 3.7 L V8	MI	166
3	LMP1-H	20	(Germany) Porsche Team	(Germany) Timo Bernhard (New Zealand) Brendon Hartley (Australia) Mark Webber	Porsche 919 Hybrid	MI	165
3	LMP1-H	20	(Germany) Porsche Team	(Germany) Timo Bernhard (New Zealand) Brendon Hartley (Australia) Mark Webber	Porsche 2.0 L Turbo V4	MI	165
4	**LMP1-L**	**12**	**(Switzerland) Rebellion Racing**	**(France) Nicolas Prost (Germany) Nick Heidfeld (Switzerland) Mathias Beche**	**Lola B12/60**	MI	**159**
4	**LMP1-L**	**12**	**(Switzerland) Rebellion Racing**	**(France) Nicolas Prost (Germany) Nick Heidfeld (Switzerland) Mathias Beche**	**Toyota RV8KLM 3.4 L V8**	MI	**159**
5	**LMP2**	**26**	**(Russia) G-Drive Racing**	**(Russia) Roman Rusinov (France) Olivier Pla (France) Julien Canal**	**Morgan LMP2**	D	**154**
5	**LMP2**	**26**	**(Russia) G-Drive Racing**	**(Russia) Roman Rusinov (France) Olivier Pla (France) Julien Canal**	**Nissan VK45DE 4.5 L V8**	D	**154**
6	LMP2	47	(Hong Kong) KCMG	(United Kingdom) Matthew Howson (United Kingdom) Richard Bradley (Japan) Tsugio Matsuda	Oreca 03	D	152
6	LMP2	47	(Hong Kong) KCMG	(United Kingdom) Matthew Howson (United Kingdom) Richard Bradley (Japan) Tsugio Matsuda	Nissan VK45DE 4.5 L V8	D	152
7	**LMGTE; Pro**	**92**	**(Germany) Porsche Team Manthey**	**(Germany) Marco Holzer (France) Frédéric Makowiecki (Austria) Richard Lietz**	**Porsche 911 RSR**	MI	**147**
7	**LMGTE; Pro**	**92**	**(Germany) Porsche Team Manthey**	**(Germany) Marco Holzer (France) Frédéric Makowiecki (Austria) Richard Lietz**	**Porsche 4.0 L Flat-6**	MI	**147**
8	LMGTE; Pro	91	(Germany) Porsche Team Manthey	(France) Patrick Pilet (Germany) Jörg Bergmeister (United Kingdom) Nick Tandy	Porsche 911 RSR	MI	147
8	LMGTE; Pro	91	(Germany) Porsche Team Manthey	(France) Patrick Pilet (Germany) Jörg Bergmeister (United Kingdom) Nick Tandy	Porsche 4.0 L Flat-6	MI	147
9	LMGTE; Pro	97	(United Kingdom) Aston Martin Racing	(United Kingdom) Darren Turner (Germany) Stefan Mücke	Aston Martin V8 Vantage GTE	MI	147
9	LMGTE; Pro	97	(United Kingdom) Aston Martin Racing	(United Kingdom) Darren Turner (Germany) Stefan Mücke	Aston Martin 4.5 L V8	MI	147
10	LMGTE; Pro	51	(Italy) AF Corse	(Italy) Gianmaria Bruni (Finland) Toni Vilander	Ferrari 458 Italia GT2	MI	147
10	LMGTE; Pro	51	(Italy) AF Corse	(Italy) Gianmaria Bruni (Finland) Toni Vilander	Ferrari 4.5 L V8	MI	147
11	LMGTE; Pro	71	(Italy) AF Corse	(Italy) Davide Rigon (United Kingdom) James Calado	Ferrari 458 Italia GT2	MI	146
11	LMGTE; Pro	71	(Italy) AF Corse	(Italy) Davide Rigon (United Kingdom) James Calado	Ferrari 4.5 L V8	MI	146
12	LMGTE; Pro	52	(United Kingdom) Ram Racing	(Republic of Ireland) Matt Griffin (Portugal) Álvaro Parente	Ferrari 458 Italia GT2	MI	146
12	LMGTE; Pro	52	(United Kingdom) Ram Racing	(Republic of Ireland) Matt Griffin (Portugal) Álvaro Parente	Ferrari 4.5 L V8	MI	146
13	LMP2	27	(Russia) SMP Racing	(Russia) Sergey Zlobin (Italy) Maurizio Mediani (France) Nicolas Minassian	Oreca 03	MI	145
13	LMP2	27	(Russia) SMP Racing	(Russia) Sergey Zlobin (Italy) Maurizio Mediani (France) Nicolas Minassian	Nissan VK45DE 4.5 L V8	MI	145
14	LMGTE; Pro	99	(United Kingdom) Aston Martin Racing	(Hong Kong) Darryl O'Young (United Kingdom) Alex MacDowall (Brazil) Fernando Rees	Aston Martin V8 Vantage GTE	MI	144
14	LMGTE; Pro	99	(United Kingdom) Aston Martin Racing	(Hong Kong) Darryl O'Young (United Kingdom) Alex MacDowall (Brazil) Fernando Rees	Aston Martin 4.5 L V8	MI	144
15	**LMGTE; Am**	**95**	**(United Kingdom) Aston Martin Racing**	**(Denmark) David Heinemeier Hansson (Denmark) Kristian Poulsen (Denmark) Nicki Thiim**	**Aston Martin V8 Vantage GTE**	MI	**144**
15	**LMGTE; Am**	**95**	**(United Kingdom) Aston Martin Racing**	**(Denmark) David Heinemeier Hansson (Denmark) Kristian Poulsen (Denmark) Nicki Thiim**	**Aston Martin 4.5 L V8**	MI	**144**
16	LMGTE; Am	98	(United Kingdom) Aston Martin Racing	(Canada) Paul Dalla Lana (Portugal) Pedro Lamy (Denmark) Christoffer Nygaard	Aston Martin V8 Vantage GTE	MI	144
16	LMGTE; Am	98	(United Kingdom) Aston Martin Racing	(Canada) Paul Dalla Lana (Portugal) Pedro Lamy (Denmark) Christoffer Nygaard	Aston Martin 4.5 L V8	MI	144
17	LMGTE; Am	81	(Italy) AF Corse	(Australia) Stephen Wyatt (Italy) Michele Rugolo (United Kingdom) Sam Bird	Ferrari 458 Italia GT2	MI	143
17	LMGTE; Am	81	(Italy) AF Corse	(Australia) Stephen Wyatt (Italy) Michele Rugolo (United Kingdom) Sam Bird	Ferrari 4.5 L V8	MI	143
18	LMGTE; Am	88	(Germany) Proton Competition	(Germany) Christian Ried (Austria) Klaus Bachler (United Arab Emirates) Khaled Al Qubaisi	Porsche 911 RSR	MI	142
18	LMGTE; Am	88	(Germany) Proton Competition	(Germany) Christian Ried (Austria) Klaus Bachler (United Arab Emirates) Khaled Al Qubaisi	Porsche 4.0 L Flat-6	MI	142
19	LMGTE; Am	53	(United Kingdom) Ram Racing	(United Kingdom) Johnny Mowlem (United Kingdom) Ben Collins (United States) Mark Patterson	Ferrari 458 Italia GT2	MI	141
19	LMGTE; Am	53	(United Kingdom) Ram Racing	(United Kingdom) Johnny Mowlem (United Kingdom) Ben Collins (United States) Mark Patterson	Ferrari 4.5 L V8	MI	141
20	LMGTE; Am	61	(Italy) AF Corse	(Argentina) Luís Pérez Companc (Italy) Marco Cioci (Italy) Mirko Venturi	Ferrari 458 Italia GT2	MI	141
20	LMGTE; Am	61	(Italy) AF Corse	(Argentina) Luís Pérez Companc (Italy) Marco Cioci (Italy) Mirko Venturi	Ferrari 4.5 L V8	MI	141
DNF	LMGTE; Am	90	(United States) 8 Star Motorsports	(Venezuela) Enzo Potolicchio (Italy) Paolo Ruberti (Italy) Gianluca Roda	Ferrari 458 Italia GT2	MI	118
DNF	LMGTE; Am	90	(United States) 8 Star Motorsports	(Venezuela) Enzo Potolicchio (Italy) Paolo Ruberti (Italy) Gianluca Roda	Ferrari 4.5 L V8	MI	118
DNF	LMP1-H	2	(Germany) Audi Sport Team Joest	(Germany) André Lotterer (Switzerland) Marcel Fässler (France) Benoît Tréluyer	Audi R18 e-tron quattro	MI	94
DNF	LMP1-H	2	(Germany) Audi Sport Team Joest	(Germany) André Lotterer (Switzerland) Marcel Fässler (France) Benoît Tréluyer	Audi TDI 4.0 L Turbo V6 (Diesel)	MI	94
DNF	LMGTE; Am	75	(Belgium) Prospeed Competition	(France) François Perrodo (France) Matthieu Vaxivière (France) Emmanuel Collard	Porsche 997 GT3-RSR	MI	83
DNF	LMGTE; Am	75	(Belgium) Prospeed Competition	(France) François Perrodo (France) Matthieu Vaxivière (France) Emmanuel Collard	Porsche 4.0 L Flat-6	MI	83
DNF	LMP2	37	(Russia) SMP Racing	(Russia) Kirill Ladygin (Russia) Anton Ladygin (Russia) Viktor Shaitar	Oreca 03	MI	65
DNF	LMP2	37	(Russia) SMP Racing	(Russia) Kirill Ladygin (Russia) Anton Ladygin (Russia) Viktor Shaitar	Nissan VK45DE 4.5 L V8	MI	65
DNF	LMP1-H	14	(Germany) Porsche Team	(Germany) Marc Lieb (France) Romain Dumas (Switzerland) Neel Jani	Porsche 919 Hybrid	MI	30
DNF	LMP1-H	14	(Germany) Porsche Team	(Germany) Marc Lieb (France) Romain Dumas (Switzerland) Neel Jani	Porsche 2.0 L Turbo V4	MI	30
DNF	LMP1-L	13	(Switzerland) Rebellion Racing	(Austria) Dominik Kraihamer (Italy) Andrea Belicchi (Switzerland) Fabio Leimer	Lola B12/60	MI	24
DNF	LMP1-L	13	(Switzerland) Rebellion Racing	(Austria) Dominik Kraihamer (Italy) Andrea Belicchi (Switzerland) Fabio Leimer	Toyota RV8KLM 3.4 L V8	MI	24
DNF	LMP1-H	1	(Germany) Audi Sport Team Joest	(Denmark) Tom Kristensen (France) Loïc Duval (Brazil) Lucas di Grassi	Audi R18 e-tron quattro	MI	24
DNF	LMP1-H	1	(Germany) Audi Sport Team Joest	(Denmark) Tom Kristensen (France) Loïc Duval (Brazil) Lucas di Grassi	Audi TDI 4.0 L Turbo V6 (Diesel)	MI	24

== See also ==
- 2014 4 Hours of Silverstone

FIA World Endurance Championship
Previous race: None	2014 season	Next race: 6 Hours of Spa-Francorchamps
