= 2015 6 Hours of Shanghai =

Sports car endurance race held at Shanghai International Circuit

Shanghai International Circuit track map

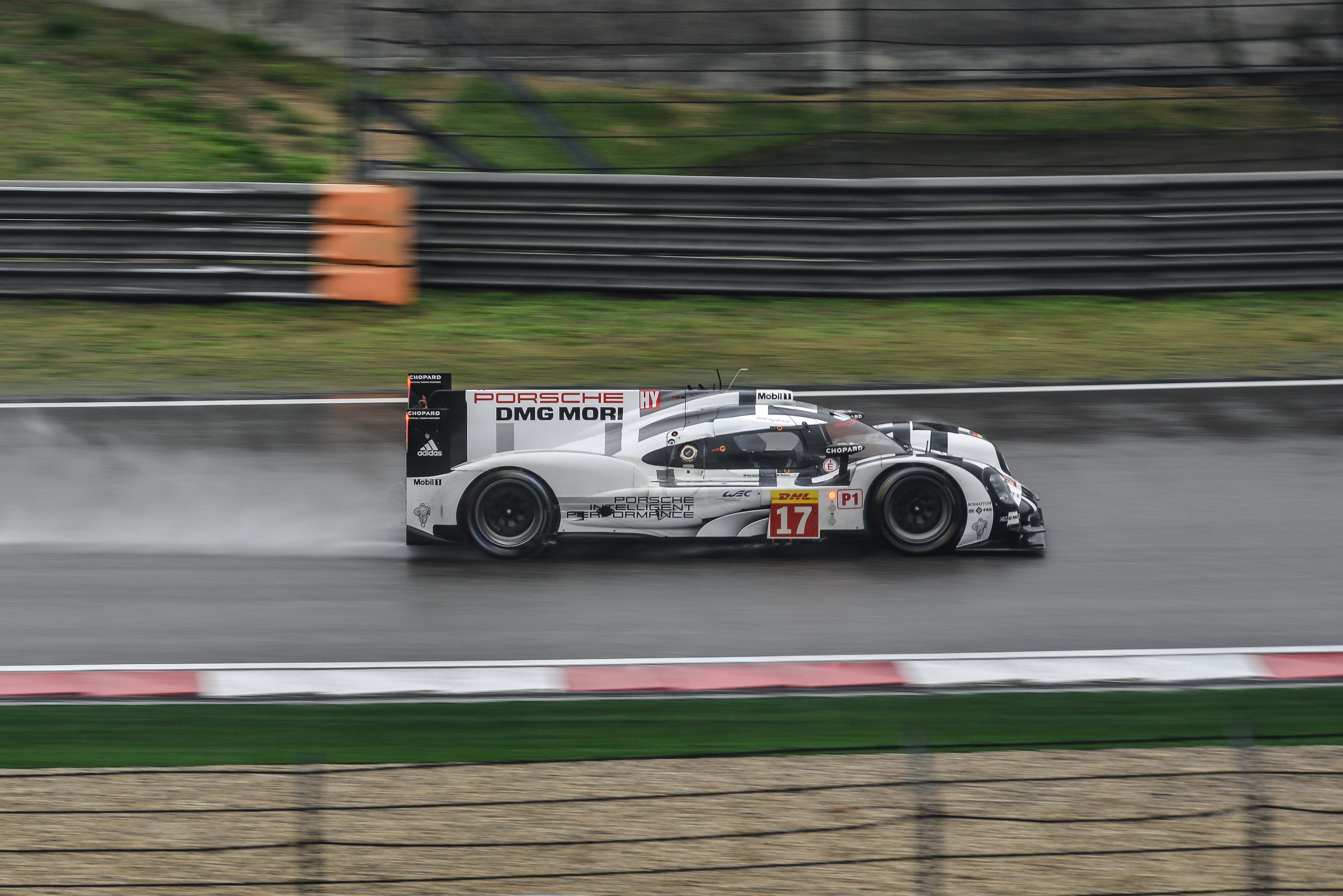
The Winning #17 Porsche Team Porsche 919 Hybrid

The 2015 6 Hours of Shanghai was an endurance sports car racing event held at the Shanghai International Circuit, Shanghai, China on 30 October–1 November 2015, and served as the seventh race of the 2015 FIA World Endurance Championship season. Porsche's Timo Bernhard, Brendon Hartley and Mark Webber won the race driving the No. 17 Porsche 919 Hybrid car.

== Qualifying ==
=== Qualifying result ===
Pole position winners in each class are marked in bold.

Pos	Class	Team	Time	Grid
1	**LMP1**	**No. 17 Porsche Team**	**1:42.719**	**1**
2	LMP1	No. 18 Porsche Team	1:43.488	2
3	LMP1	No. 8 Audi Sport Team Joest	1:44.200	3
4	LMP1	No. 7 Audi Sport Team Joest	1:44.645	4
5	LMP1	No. 1 Toyota Racing	1:45.776	5
6	LMP1	No. 2 Toyota Racing	1:45.962	6
7	LMP1	No. 13 Rebellion Racing	1:49.418	7
8	LMP1	No. 12 Rebellion Racing	1:50.942	8
9	LMP1	No. 4 Team ByKolles	1:52.069	9
10	**LMP2**	**No. 26 G-Drive Racing**	**1:52.763**	**10**
11	LMP2	No. 47 KCMG	1:53.345	11
12	LMP2	No. 28 G-Drive Racing	1:53.390	12
13	LMP2	No. 43 Team SARD Morand	1:53.600	13
14	LMP2	No. 36 Signatech Alpine	1:53.747	14
15	LMP2	No. 30 Extreme Speed Motorsports	1:54.775	15
16	LMP2	No. 42 Strakka Racing	1:55.205	16
17	LMP2	No. 29 Pegasus Racing	1:56.624	17
18	LMP2	No. 31 Extreme Speed Motorsports	1:57.432	18
19	**LMGTE Pro**	**No. 51 AF Corse**	**2:02.243**	**19**
20	LMGTE Pro	No. 71 AF Corse	2:02.508	20
21	LMGTE Pro	No. 99 Aston Martin Racing V8	2:02.540	21
22	LMGTE Pro	No. 92 Porsche Team Manthey	2:03.048	22
23	LMGTE Pro	No. 91 Porsche Team Manthey	2:03.352	23
24	LMGTE Pro	No. 97 Aston Martin Racing	2:03.393	24
25	**LMGTE Am**	**No. 98 Aston Martin Racing**	**2:04.728**	**25**
26	LMGTE Am	No. 96 Aston Martin Racing	2:04.858	26
27	LMGTE Am	No. 50 Larbre Compétition	2:04.874	27
28	LMGTE Am	No. 83 AF Corse	2:05.455	28
29	LMGTE Am	No. 72 SMP Racing	2:05.556	29
30	LMGTE Am	No. 77 Dempsey Racing-Proton	2:06.196	30
31	LMGTE Am	No. 88 Abu Dhabi-Proton Racing	2:11.851	31

== Race ==
=== Race result ===
Class winners in bold.

Pos	Class	No	Team	Drivers	Chassis	Tyre	Laps
Pos	Class	No	Team	Drivers	Engine	Tyre	Laps
1	**LMP1**	**17**	**(Germany) Porsche Team**	**(Germany) Timo Bernhard (New Zealand) Brendon Hartley (Australia) Mark Webber**	**Porsche 919 Hybrid**	MI	**169**
1	**LMP1**	**17**	**(Germany) Porsche Team**	**(Germany) Timo Bernhard (New Zealand) Brendon Hartley (Australia) Mark Webber**	**Porsche 2.0 L Turbo V4**	MI	**169**
2	LMP1	18	(Germany) Porsche Team	(Germany) Marc Lieb (France) Romain Dumas (Switzerland) Neel Jani	Porsche 919 Hybrid	MI	169
2	LMP1	18	(Germany) Porsche Team	(Germany) Marc Lieb (France) Romain Dumas (Switzerland) Neel Jani	Porsche 2.0 L Turbo V4	MI	169
3	LMP1	7	(Germany) Audi Sport Team Joest	(Germany) André Lotterer (Switzerland) Marcel Fässler (France) Benoît Tréluyer	Audi R18 e-tron quattro	MI	169
3	LMP1	7	(Germany) Audi Sport Team Joest	(Germany) André Lotterer (Switzerland) Marcel Fässler (France) Benoît Tréluyer	Audi TDI 4.0 L Turbo Diesel V6	MI	169
4	LMP1	8	(Germany) Audi Sport Team Joest	(France) Loïc Duval (Brazil) Lucas di Grassi (United Kingdom) Oliver Jarvis	Audi R18 e-tron quattro	MI	169
4	LMP1	8	(Germany) Audi Sport Team Joest	(France) Loïc Duval (Brazil) Lucas di Grassi (United Kingdom) Oliver Jarvis	Audi TDI 4.0 L Turbo Diesel V6	MI	169
5	LMP1	2	(Japan) Toyota Racing	(Austria) Alexander Wurz (France) Stéphane Sarrazin (United Kingdom) Mike Conway	Toyota TS040 Hybrid	MI	165
5	LMP1	2	(Japan) Toyota Racing	(Austria) Alexander Wurz (France) Stéphane Sarrazin (United Kingdom) Mike Conway	Toyota 3.7 L V8	MI	165
6	LMP1	1	(Japan) Toyota Racing	(United Kingdom) Anthony Davidson (Switzerland) Sébastien Buemi (Japan) Kazuki Nakajima	Toyota TS040 Hybrid	MI	164
6	LMP1	1	(Japan) Toyota Racing	(United Kingdom) Anthony Davidson (Switzerland) Sébastien Buemi (Japan) Kazuki Nakajima	Toyota 3.7 L V8	MI	164
7	LMP1	12	(Switzerland) Rebellion Racing	(France) Nicolas Prost (Switzerland) Mathias Beche	Rebellion R-One	MI	158
7	LMP1	12	(Switzerland) Rebellion Racing	(France) Nicolas Prost (Switzerland) Mathias Beche	AER P60 2.4 L Turbo V6	MI	158
8	LMP1	4	(Austria) Team ByKolles	(Switzerland) Simon Trummer (Germany) Pierre Kaffer	CLM P1/01	MI	156
8	LMP1	4	(Austria) Team ByKolles	(Switzerland) Simon Trummer (Germany) Pierre Kaffer	AER P60 2.4 L Turbo V6	MI	156
9	**LMP2**	**36**	**(France) Signatech Alpine**	**(France) Nelson Panciatici (France) Paul-Loup Chatin (France) Tom Dillmann**	**Alpine A450b**	D	**154**
9	**LMP2**	**36**	**(France) Signatech Alpine**	**(France) Nelson Panciatici (France) Paul-Loup Chatin (France) Tom Dillmann**	**Nissan VK45DE 4.5 L V8**	D	**154**
10	LMP2	26	(Russia) G-Drive Racing	(Russia) Roman Rusinov (France) Julien Canal (United Kingdom) Sam Bird	Ligier JS P2	D	153
10	LMP2	26	(Russia) G-Drive Racing	(Russia) Roman Rusinov (France) Julien Canal (United Kingdom) Sam Bird	Nissan VK45DE 4.5 L V8	D	153
11	LMP2	47	(Hong Kong) KCMG	(United Kingdom) Matthew Howson (United Kingdom) Richard Bradley (United Kingdom) Nick Tandy	Oreca 05	D	153
11	LMP2	47	(Hong Kong) KCMG	(United Kingdom) Matthew Howson (United Kingdom) Richard Bradley (United Kingdom) Nick Tandy	Nissan VK45DE 4.5 L V8	D	153
12	LMP2	43	(Switzerland) Team SARD Morand	(United Kingdom) Oliver Webb (France) Pierre Ragues (Canada) Chris Cumming	Morgan LMP2 Evo	D	152
12	LMP2	43	(Switzerland) Team SARD Morand	(United Kingdom) Oliver Webb (France) Pierre Ragues (Canada) Chris Cumming	SARD 3.6 L V8	D	152
13	LMP2	29	(Germany) Pegasus Racing	(United Kingdom) Alex Brundle (Netherlands) Ho-Pin Tung (United States) David Cheng	Morgan LMP2	MI	152
13	LMP2	29	(Germany) Pegasus Racing	(United Kingdom) Alex Brundle (Netherlands) Ho-Pin Tung (United States) David Cheng	Nissan VK45DE 4.5 L V8	MI	152
14	**LMGTE; Pro**	**91**	**(Germany) Porsche Team Manthey**	**(Austria) Richard Lietz (Denmark) Michael Christensen**	**Porsche 911 RSR**	MI	**151**
14	**LMGTE; Pro**	**91**	**(Germany) Porsche Team Manthey**	**(Austria) Richard Lietz (Denmark) Michael Christensen**	**Porsche 4.0 L Flat-6**	MI	**151**
15	LMGTE; Pro	51	(Italy) AF Corse	(Italy) Gianmaria Bruni (Finland) Toni Vilander	Ferrari 458 Italia GT2	MI	151
15	LMGTE; Pro	51	(Italy) AF Corse	(Italy) Gianmaria Bruni (Finland) Toni Vilander	Ferrari 4.5 L V8	MI	151
16	LMGTE; Pro	92	(Germany) Porsche Team Manthey	(France) Patrick Pilet (France) Frédéric Makowiecki	Porsche 911 RSR	MI	151
16	LMGTE; Pro	92	(Germany) Porsche Team Manthey	(France) Patrick Pilet (France) Frédéric Makowiecki	Porsche 4.0 L Flat-6	MI	151
17	LMGTE; Pro	71	(Italy) AF Corse	(Italy) Davide Rigon (United Kingdom) James Calado	Ferrari 458 Italia GT2	MI	150
17	LMGTE; Pro	71	(Italy) AF Corse	(Italy) Davide Rigon (United Kingdom) James Calado	Ferrari 4.5 L V8	MI	150
18	LMGTE; Pro	99	(United Kingdom) Aston Martin Racing V8	(Brazil) Fernando Rees (United Kingdom) Alex MacDowall (New Zealand) Richie Stanaway	Aston Martin V8 Vantage GTE	MI	149
18	LMGTE; Pro	99	(United Kingdom) Aston Martin Racing V8	(Brazil) Fernando Rees (United Kingdom) Alex MacDowall (New Zealand) Richie Stanaway	Aston Martin 4.5 L V8	MI	149
19	LMGTE; Pro	97	(United Kingdom) Aston Martin Racing	(United Kingdom) Darren Turner (United Kingdom) Jonathan Adam	Aston Martin V8 Vantage GTE	MI	149
19	LMGTE; Pro	97	(United Kingdom) Aston Martin Racing	(United Kingdom) Darren Turner (United Kingdom) Jonathan Adam	Aston Martin 4.5 L V8	MI	149
20	LMP2	31	(United States) Extreme Speed Motorsports	(United States) Ed Brown (United States) Johannes van Overbeek (United States) Jon Fogarty	Ligier JS P2	D	147
20	LMP2	31	(United States) Extreme Speed Motorsports	(United States) Ed Brown (United States) Johannes van Overbeek (United States) Jon Fogarty	Honda HR28TT 2.8 L Turbo V6	D	147
21	**LMGTE; Am**	**83**	**(Italy) AF Corse**	**(France) François Perrodo (France) Emmanuel Collard (Portugal) Rui Águas**	**Ferrari 458 Italia GT2**	MI	**146**
21	**LMGTE; Am**	**83**	**(Italy) AF Corse**	**(France) François Perrodo (France) Emmanuel Collard (Portugal) Rui Águas**	**Ferrari 4.5 L V8**	MI	**146**
22	LMGTE; Am	98	(United Kingdom) Aston Martin Racing	(Canada) Paul Dalla Lana (Portugal) Pedro Lamy (Austria) Mathias Lauda	Aston Martin V8 Vantage GTE	MI	146
22	LMGTE; Am	98	(United Kingdom) Aston Martin Racing	(Canada) Paul Dalla Lana (Portugal) Pedro Lamy (Austria) Mathias Lauda	Aston Martin 4.5 L V8	MI	146
23	LMGTE; Am	72	(Russia) SMP Racing	(Russia) Viktor Shaitar (Russia) Aleksey Basov (Italy) Andrea Bertolini	Ferrari 458 Italia GT2	MI	145
23	LMGTE; Am	72	(Russia) SMP Racing	(Russia) Viktor Shaitar (Russia) Aleksey Basov (Italy) Andrea Bertolini	Ferrari 4.5 L V8	MI	145
24	LMGTE; Am	77	(Germany) Dempsey Racing-Proton	(United States) Patrick Dempsey (United States) Patrick Long (Germany) Marco Seefried	Porsche 911 RSR	MI	145
24	LMGTE; Am	77	(Germany) Dempsey Racing-Proton	(United States) Patrick Dempsey (United States) Patrick Long (Germany) Marco Seefried	Porsche 4.0 L Flat-6	MI	145
25	LMGTE; Am	50	(France) Larbre Compétition	(Italy) Gianluca Roda (Italy) Paolo Ruberti (Denmark) Nicolai Sylvest	Chevrolet Corvette C7.R	MI	144
25	LMGTE; Am	50	(France) Larbre Compétition	(Italy) Gianluca Roda (Italy) Paolo Ruberti (Denmark) Nicolai Sylvest	Chevrolet 5.5 L V8	MI	144
26	LMP2	42	(United Kingdom) Strakka Racing	(United Kingdom) Nick Leventis (United Kingdom) Jonny Kane (United Kingdom) Danny Watts	Gibson 015S	MI	144
26	LMP2	42	(United Kingdom) Strakka Racing	(United Kingdom) Nick Leventis (United Kingdom) Jonny Kane (United Kingdom) Danny Watts	Nissan VK45DE 4.5 L V8	MI	144
27	LMGTE; Am	96	(United Kingdom) Aston Martin Racing	(United Kingdom) Liam Griffin (United Kingdom) Stuart Hall (Italy) Francesco Castellacci	Aston Martin V8 Vantage GTE	MI	139
27	LMGTE; Am	96	(United Kingdom) Aston Martin Racing	(United Kingdom) Liam Griffin (United Kingdom) Stuart Hall (Italy) Francesco Castellacci	Aston Martin 4.5 L V8	MI	139
28	LMGTE; Am	88	(Germany) Abu Dhabi-Proton Racing	(Germany) Christian Ried (Austria) Klaus Bachler (United Arab Emirates) Khaled Al Qubaisi	Porsche 911 RSR	MI	139
28	LMGTE; Am	88	(Germany) Abu Dhabi-Proton Racing	(Germany) Christian Ried (Austria) Klaus Bachler (United Arab Emirates) Khaled Al Qubaisi	Porsche 4.0 L Flat-6	MI	139
DNF	LMP1	13	(Switzerland) Rebellion Racing	(Switzerland) Alexandre Imperatori (Switzerland) Mathéo Tuscher (Austria) Dominik Kraihamer	Rebellion R-One	MI	153
DNF	LMP1	13	(Switzerland) Rebellion Racing	(Switzerland) Alexandre Imperatori (Switzerland) Mathéo Tuscher (Austria) Dominik Kraihamer	AER P60 2.4 L Turbo V6	MI	153
DNF	LMP2	28	(Russia) G-Drive Racing	(Colombia) Gustavo Yacamán (Mexico) Ricardo González (Brazil) Pipo Derani	Ligier JS P2	D	153
DNF	LMP2	28	(Russia) G-Drive Racing	(Colombia) Gustavo Yacamán (Mexico) Ricardo González (Brazil) Pipo Derani	Nissan VK45DE 4.5 L V8	D	153
DNF	LMP2	30	(United States) Extreme Speed Motorsports	(United States) Scott Sharp (United Kingdom) Ryan Dalziel (Denmark) David Heinemeier Hansson	Ligier JS P2	D	88
DNF	LMP2	30	(United States) Extreme Speed Motorsports	(United States) Scott Sharp (United Kingdom) Ryan Dalziel (Denmark) David Heinemeier Hansson	Honda HR28TT 2.8 L Turbo V6	D	88

FIA World Endurance Championship
Previous race: 6 Hours of Fuji	2015 season	Next race: 6 Hours of Bahrain
