= 2015 6 Hours of Fuji =

Sports car endurance race held at Fuji Speedway, Oyama, Japan

Map of Fuji Speedway

The 2015 6 Hours of Fuji was an endurance sports car racing event held at the Fuji Speedway, Oyama, Japan on 9–11 October 2015, and served as the sixth race of the 2015 FIA World Endurance Championship season. Porsche's Timo Bernhard, Brendon Hartley and Mark Webber won the race driving the No. 17 Porsche 919 Hybrid car.

== Qualifying ==
=== Qualifying result ===
Pole position winners in each class are marked in bold.

Pos	Class	Team	Average Time	Grid
1	**LMP1**	**No. 17 Porsche Team**	**1:22.763**	**1**
2	LMP1	No. 18 Porsche Team	1:23.071	2
3	LMP1	No. 7 Audi Sport Team Joest	1:23.082	3
4	LMP1	No. 8 Audi Sport Team Joest	1:23.245	4
5	LMP1	No. 1 Toyota Racing	1:25.072	5
6	LMP1	No. 2 Toyota Racing	1:25.327	6
7	LMP1	No. 13 Rebellion Racing	1:28.492	7
8	LMP1	No. 12 Rebellion Racing	1:28.641	8
9	LMP1	No. 4 Team ByKolles	1:30.740	9
10	**LMP2**	**No. 26 G-Drive Racing**	**1:31.529**	**10**
11	LMP2	No. 28 G-Drive Racing	1:31.750	11
12	LMP2	No. 43 Team SARD Morand	1:32.163	12
13	LMP2	No. 47 KCMG	1:32.275	13
14	LMP2	No. 36 Signatech Alpine	1:32.483	14
15	LMP2	No. 30 Extreme Speed Motorsports	1:32.558	15
16	LMP2	No. 42 Strakka Racing	1:33.490	16
17	LMP2	No. 31 Extreme Speed Motorsports	1:34.892	17
18	**LMGTE Pro**	**No. 71 AF Corse**	**1:38.295**	**18**
19	LMGTE Pro	No. 51 AF Corse	1:38.403	19
20	LMGTE Pro	No. 99 Aston Martin Racing V8	1:38.540	20
21	LMGTE Pro	No. 91 Porsche Team Manthey	1:38.751	21
22	LMGTE Pro	No. 92 Porsche Team Manthey	1:38.864	22
23	LMGTE Pro	No. 97 Aston Martin Racing	1:38.979	23
24	LMGTE Pro	No. 95 Aston Martin Racing	1:39.028	24
25	**LMGTE Am**	**No. 72 SMP Racing**	**1:40.128**	**25**
26	LMGTE Am	No. 98 Aston Martin Racing	1:40.442	26
27	LMGTE Am	No. 83 AF Corse	1:40.516	27
28	LMGTE Am	No. 77 Dempsey Racing-Proton	1:41.055	28
29	LMGTE Am	No. 96 Aston Martin Racing	1:41.181	29
30	LMGTE Am	No. 88 Abu Dhabi-Proton Racing	1:48.415	30
–	LMGTE Am	No. 50 Larbre Compétition	No Time^{1}	31

^1 – The No. 50 Larbre Competition had its qualifying lap time deleted due to non-conformity of the car's fuel cell ventilation valve, but was allowed to start from the rear of the grid.

== Race ==
=== Race result ===
Class winners in bold.

Pos	Class	No	Team	Drivers	Chassis	Tyre	Laps
Pos	Class	No	Team	Drivers	Engine	Tyre	Laps
1	**LMP1**	**17**	**(Germany) Porsche Team**	**(Germany) Timo Bernhard (New Zealand) Brendon Hartley (Australia) Mark Webber**	**Porsche 919 Hybrid**	MI	**216**
1	**LMP1**	**17**	**(Germany) Porsche Team**	**(Germany) Timo Bernhard (New Zealand) Brendon Hartley (Australia) Mark Webber**	**Porsche 2.0 L Turbo V4**	MI	**216**
2	LMP1	18	(Germany) Porsche Team	(Germany) Marc Lieb (France) Romain Dumas (Switzerland) Neel Jani	Porsche 919 Hybrid	MI	216
2	LMP1	18	(Germany) Porsche Team	(Germany) Marc Lieb (France) Romain Dumas (Switzerland) Neel Jani	Porsche 2.0 L Turbo V4	MI	216
3	LMP1	7	(Germany) Audi Sport Team Joest	(Germany) André Lotterer (Switzerland) Marcel Fässler (France) Benoît Tréluyer	Audi R18 e-tron quattro	MI	215
3	LMP1	7	(Germany) Audi Sport Team Joest	(Germany) André Lotterer (Switzerland) Marcel Fässler (France) Benoît Tréluyer	Audi TDI 4.0 L Turbo Diesel V6	MI	215
4	LMP1	8	(Germany) Audi Sport Team Joest	(France) Loïc Duval (Brazil) Lucas di Grassi (United Kingdom) Oliver Jarvis	Audi R18 e-tron quattro	MI	214
4	LMP1	8	(Germany) Audi Sport Team Joest	(France) Loïc Duval (Brazil) Lucas di Grassi (United Kingdom) Oliver Jarvis	Audi TDI 4.0 L Turbo Diesel V6	MI	214
5	LMP1	1	(Japan) Toyota Racing	(United Kingdom) Anthony Davidson (Switzerland) Sébastien Buemi (Japan) Kazuki Nakajima	Toyota TS040 Hybrid	MI	214
5	LMP1	1	(Japan) Toyota Racing	(United Kingdom) Anthony Davidson (Switzerland) Sébastien Buemi (Japan) Kazuki Nakajima	Toyota 3.7 L V8	MI	214
6	LMP1	2	(Japan) Toyota Racing	(Austria) Alexander Wurz (France) Stéphane Sarrazin (United Kingdom) Mike Conway	Toyota TS040 Hybrid	MI	203
6	LMP1	2	(Japan) Toyota Racing	(Austria) Alexander Wurz (France) Stéphane Sarrazin (United Kingdom) Mike Conway	Toyota 3.7 L V8	MI	203
7	LMP1	12	(Switzerland) Rebellion Racing	(France) Nicolas Prost (Switzerland) Mathias Beche	Rebellion R-One	MI	203
7	LMP1	12	(Switzerland) Rebellion Racing	(France) Nicolas Prost (Switzerland) Mathias Beche	AER P60 2.4 L Turbo V6	MI	203
8	LMP1	4	(Austria) Team ByKolles	(Switzerland) Simon Trummer (Germany) Pierre Kaffer	CLM P1/01	MI	199
8	LMP1	4	(Austria) Team ByKolles	(Switzerland) Simon Trummer (Germany) Pierre Kaffer	AER P60 2.4 L Turbo V6	MI	199
9	**LMP2**	**26**	**(Russia) G-Drive Racing**	**(Russia) Roman Rusinov (France) Julien Canal (United Kingdom) Sam Bird**	**Ligier JS P2**	D	**198**
9	**LMP2**	**26**	**(Russia) G-Drive Racing**	**(Russia) Roman Rusinov (France) Julien Canal (United Kingdom) Sam Bird**	**Nissan VK45DE 4.5 L V8**	D	**198**
10	LMP2	36	(France) Signatech Alpine	(France) Nelson Panciatici (France) Paul-Loup Chatin (France) Vincent Capillaire	Alpine A450b	D	198
10	LMP2	36	(France) Signatech Alpine	(France) Nelson Panciatici (France) Paul-Loup Chatin (France) Vincent Capillaire	Nissan VK45DE 4.5 L V8	D	198
11	LMP2	28	(Russia) G-Drive Racing	(Colombia) Gustavo Yacamán (Mexico) Ricardo González (Brazil) Pipo Derani	Ligier JS P2	D	197
11	LMP2	28	(Russia) G-Drive Racing	(Colombia) Gustavo Yacamán (Mexico) Ricardo González (Brazil) Pipo Derani	Nissan VK45DE 4.5 L V8	D	197
12	LMP2	30	(United States) Extreme Speed Motorsports	(United States) Scott Sharp (United Kingdom) Ryan Dalziel (Denmark) David Heinemeier Hansson	Ligier JS P2	D	194
12	LMP2	30	(United States) Extreme Speed Motorsports	(United States) Scott Sharp (United Kingdom) Ryan Dalziel (Denmark) David Heinemeier Hansson	Honda HR28TT 2.8 L Turbo V6	D	194
13	**LMGTE; Pro**	**51**	**(Italy) AF Corse**	**(Italy) Gianmaria Bruni (Finland) Toni Vilander**	**Ferrari 458 Italia GT2**	MI	**193**
13	**LMGTE; Pro**	**51**	**(Italy) AF Corse**	**(Italy) Gianmaria Bruni (Finland) Toni Vilander**	**Ferrari 4.5 L V8**	MI	**193**
14	LMP2	43	(Switzerland) Team SARD Morand	(United Kingdom) Oliver Webb (France) Pierre Ragues (Canada) Chris Cumming	Morgan LMP2 Evo	D	193
14	LMP2	43	(Switzerland) Team SARD Morand	(United Kingdom) Oliver Webb (France) Pierre Ragues (Canada) Chris Cumming	SARD 3.6 L V8	D	193
15	LMGTE; Pro	92	(Germany) Porsche Team Manthey	(France) Patrick Pilet (France) Frédéric Makowiecki	Porsche 911 RSR	MI	192
15	LMGTE; Pro	92	(Germany) Porsche Team Manthey	(France) Patrick Pilet (France) Frédéric Makowiecki	Porsche 4.0 L Flat-6	MI	192
16	LMGTE; Pro	71	(Italy) AF Corse	(Italy) Davide Rigon (United Kingdom) James Calado	Ferrari 458 Italia GT2	MI	192
16	LMGTE; Pro	71	(Italy) AF Corse	(Italy) Davide Rigon (United Kingdom) James Calado	Ferrari 4.5 L V8	MI	192
17	LMGTE; Pro	91	(Germany) Porsche Team Manthey	(Austria) Richard Lietz (Denmark) Michael Christensen	Porsche 911 RSR	MI	192
17	LMGTE; Pro	91	(Germany) Porsche Team Manthey	(Austria) Richard Lietz (Denmark) Michael Christensen	Porsche 4.0 L Flat-6	MI	192
18	LMP2	42	(United Kingdom) Strakka Racing	(United Kingdom) Nick Leventis (United Kingdom) Jonny Kane (United Kingdom) Danny Watts	Gibson 015S	D	192
18	LMP2	42	(United Kingdom) Strakka Racing	(United Kingdom) Nick Leventis (United Kingdom) Jonny Kane (United Kingdom) Danny Watts	Nissan VK45DE 4.5 L V8	D	192
19	LMGTE; Pro	95	(United Kingdom) Aston Martin Racing	(Denmark) Christoffer Nygaard (Denmark) Marco Sørensen	Aston Martin V8 Vantage GTE	MI	191
19	LMGTE; Pro	95	(United Kingdom) Aston Martin Racing	(Denmark) Christoffer Nygaard (Denmark) Marco Sørensen	Aston Martin 4.5 L V8	MI	191
20	LMGTE; Pro	97	(United Kingdom) Aston Martin Racing	(United Kingdom) Darren Turner (United Kingdom) Jonathan Adam	Aston Martin V8 Vantage GTE	MI	190
20	LMGTE; Pro	97	(United Kingdom) Aston Martin Racing	(United Kingdom) Darren Turner (United Kingdom) Jonathan Adam	Aston Martin 4.5 L V8	MI	190
21	LMGTE; Pro	99	(United Kingdom) Aston Martin Racing V8	(Brazil) Fernando Rees (United Kingdom) Alex MacDowall (Germany) Stefan Mücke	Aston Martin V8 Vantage GTE	MI	190
21	LMGTE; Pro	99	(United Kingdom) Aston Martin Racing V8	(Brazil) Fernando Rees (United Kingdom) Alex MacDowall (Germany) Stefan Mücke	Aston Martin 4.5 L V8	MI	190
22	**LMGTE; Am**	**77**	**(Germany) Dempsey Racing-Proton**	**(United States) Patrick Dempsey (United States) Patrick Long (Germany) Marco Seefried**	**Porsche 911 RSR**	MI	**187**
22	**LMGTE; Am**	**77**	**(Germany) Dempsey Racing-Proton**	**(United States) Patrick Dempsey (United States) Patrick Long (Germany) Marco Seefried**	**Porsche 4.0 L Flat-6**	MI	**187**
23	LMGTE; Am	98	(United Kingdom) Aston Martin Racing	(Canada) Paul Dalla Lana (Portugal) Pedro Lamy (Austria) Mathias Lauda	Aston Martin V8 Vantage GTE	MI	187
23	LMGTE; Am	98	(United Kingdom) Aston Martin Racing	(Canada) Paul Dalla Lana (Portugal) Pedro Lamy (Austria) Mathias Lauda	Aston Martin 4.5 L V8	MI	187
24	LMGTE; Am	83	(Italy) AF Corse	(France) François Perrodo (France) Emmanuel Collard (Portugal) Rui Águas	Ferrari 458 Italia GT2	MI	186
24	LMGTE; Am	83	(Italy) AF Corse	(France) François Perrodo (France) Emmanuel Collard (Portugal) Rui Águas	Ferrari 4.5 L V8	MI	186
25	LMP2	31	(United States) Extreme Speed Motorsports	(United States) Ed Brown (United States) Johannes van Overbeek (United States) Jon Fogarty	Ligier JS P2	D	186
25	LMP2	31	(United States) Extreme Speed Motorsports	(United States) Ed Brown (United States) Johannes van Overbeek (United States) Jon Fogarty	Honda HR28TT 2.8 L Turbo V6	D	186
26	LMGTE; Am	50	(France) Larbre Compétition	(Italy) Gianluca Roda (Italy) Paolo Ruberti (Denmark) Nicolai Sylvest	Chevrolet Corvette C7.R	MI	185
26	LMGTE; Am	50	(France) Larbre Compétition	(Italy) Gianluca Roda (Italy) Paolo Ruberti (Denmark) Nicolai Sylvest	Chevrolet 5.5 L V8	MI	185
27	LMGTE; Am	88	(Germany) Abu Dhabi-Proton Racing	(Germany) Christian Ried (New Zealand) Earl Bamber (United Arab Emirates) Khaled Al Qubaisi	Porsche 911 RSR	MI	185
27	LMGTE; Am	88	(Germany) Abu Dhabi-Proton Racing	(Germany) Christian Ried (New Zealand) Earl Bamber (United Arab Emirates) Khaled Al Qubaisi	Porsche 4.0 L Flat-6	MI	185
28	LMGTE; Am	72	(Russia) SMP Racing	(Russia) Viktor Shaitar (Russia) Aleksey Basov (Italy) Andrea Bertolini	Ferrari 458 Italia GT2	MI	185
28	LMGTE; Am	72	(Russia) SMP Racing	(Russia) Viktor Shaitar (Russia) Aleksey Basov (Italy) Andrea Bertolini	Ferrari 4.5 L V8	MI	185
29	LMGTE; Am	96	(United Kingdom) Aston Martin Racing	(United Kingdom) Liam Griffin (United Kingdom) Stuart Hall (Italy) Francesco Castellacci	Aston Martin V8 Vantage GTE	MI	184
29	LMGTE; Am	96	(United Kingdom) Aston Martin Racing	(United Kingdom) Liam Griffin (United Kingdom) Stuart Hall (Italy) Francesco Castellacci	Aston Martin 4.5 L V8	MI	184
30	LMP1	13	(Switzerland) Rebellion Racing	(Austria) Dominik Kraihamer (Switzerland) Alexandre Imperatori (Germany) Daniel Abt	Rebellion R-One	MI	164
30	LMP1	13	(Switzerland) Rebellion Racing	(Austria) Dominik Kraihamer (Switzerland) Alexandre Imperatori (Germany) Daniel Abt	AER P60 2.4 L Turbo V6	MI	164
DNF	LMP2	47	(Hong Kong) KCMG	(United Kingdom) Matthew Howson (United Kingdom) Richard Bradley (United Kingdom) Nick Tandy	Oreca 05	D	192
DNF	LMP2	47	(Hong Kong) KCMG	(United Kingdom) Matthew Howson (United Kingdom) Richard Bradley (United Kingdom) Nick Tandy	Nissan VK45DE 4.5 L V8	D	192

FIA World Endurance Championship
Previous race: 6 Hours of Circuit of the Americas	2015 season	Next race: 6 Hours of Shanghai
