= 2015 6 Hours of Circuit of the Americas =

Endurance sportscar racing event in Austin, Texas

(United States) 2015 6 Hours of Circuit of the Americas
Event information
- Round 5 of 8 in the 2015 FIA World Endurance Championship
- Date: 19 September 2015
- Location: Austin, Texas
- Venue: Circuit of the Americas
- Duration: 6 Hours

Results
- Laps completed: 185
- Distance (km): 1019.905
- Distance (miles): 633.81
- LMP1

Pole position
- Time: 1:46.211
- Team: (Germany) Porsche Team

Winners
- Team: (Germany) Porsche Team
- Drivers: (Germany) Timo Bernhard (New Zealand) Brendon Hartley (Australia) Mark Webber
- LMP2

Winners
- Team: (Russia) G-Drive Racing
- Drivers: (United Kingdom) Sam Bird (France) Julien Canal (Russia) Roman Rusinov
- LMGTE Pro

Winners
- Team: (Germany) Porsche Team Manthey
- Drivers: (Denmark) Michael Christensen (Austria) Richard Lietz
- LMGTE Am

Winners
- Team: (Russia) SMP Racing
- Drivers: (Russia) Aleksey Basov (Italy) Andrea Bertolini (Russia) Viktor Shaytar

The 2015 6 Hours of Circuit of the Americas was an endurance sports car racing event held at the Circuit of the Americas, Austin, US, on 17–19 September 2015, and served as the fifth round of the 2015 FIA World Endurance Championship season. Porsche's Timo Bernhard, Brendon Hartley and Mark Webber won the race driving the No. 17 Porsche 919 Hybrid car.

== Qualifying ==
=== Qualifying result ===
Pole position winners in each class are marked in bold.

Pos	Class	Team	Average Time	Grid
1	**LMP1**	**No. 18 Porsche Team**	**1:46.211**	**1**
2	LMP1	No. 17 Porsche Team	1:46.375	2
3	LMP1	No. 8 Audi Sport Team Joest	1:47.538	3
4	LMP1	No. 7 Audi Sport Team Joest	1:47.898	4
5	LMP1	No. 1 Toyota Racing	1:48.990	5
6	LMP1	No. 2 Toyota Racing	1:49.176	6
7	LMP1	No. 12 Rebellion Racing	1:53.950	7
8	LMP1	No. 13 Rebellion Racing	1:54.506	8
9	LMP1	No. 4 Team ByKolles	1:55.794	9
10	**LMP2**	**No. 26 G-Drive Racing**	**1:57.148**	**10**
11	LMP2	No. 28 G-Drive Racing	1:57.474	11
12	LMP2	No. 30 Extreme Speed Motorsports	1:57.621	12
13	LMP2	No. 43 Team SARD Morand	1:58.109	13
14	LMP2	No. 42 Strakka Racing	1:59.749	14
15	LMP2	No. 31 Extreme Speed Motorsports	2:01.480	15
16	**LMGTE Pro**	**No. 99 Aston Martin Racing V8**	**2:05.872**	**18**
17	LMGTE Pro	No. 91 Porsche Team Manthey	2:06.134	19
18	LMGTE Pro	No. 97 Aston Martin Racing	2:06.272	20
19	LMGTE Pro	No. 95 Aston Martin Racing	2:06.294	21
20	LMGTE Pro	No. 92 Porsche Team Manthey	2:06.363	22
21	LMGTE Pro	No. 51 AF Corse	2:06.786	23
22	LMGTE Pro	No. 71 AF Corse	2:06.975	24
23	**LMGTE Am**	**No. 77 Dempsey Racing-Proton**	**2:08.085**	**25**
24	LMGTE Am	No. 96 Aston Martin Racing	2:08.264	26
25	LMGTE Am	No. 83 AF Corse	2:08.332	27
26	LMGTE Am	No. 98 Aston Martin Racing	2:08.440	28
27	LMGTE Am	No. 72 SMP Racing	2:08.442	29
28	LMGTE Am	No. 50 Larbre Compétition	2:08.802	30
29	LMP2	No. 36 Signatech Alpine	1:57.860^{1}	16
–	LMP2	No. 47 KCMG	No Time^{2}	17
–	LMGTE Am	No. 88 Abu Dhabi-Proton Racing	No Time	31

^1 – Only one driver of the No. 36 Signatech Alpine set a lap time.

^2 – The No. 47 KCMG had its qualifying lap time deleted due to driving the car in the opposite direction of the track, but was allowed to start from the rear of the LMP grid.

== Race ==
=== Race result ===
Class winners in bold.

Pos	Class	No	Team	Drivers	Chassis	Tyre	Laps
Pos	Class	No	Team	Drivers	Engine	Tyre	Laps
1	**LMP1**	**17**	**(Germany) Porsche Team**	**(Germany) Timo Bernhard (New Zealand) Brendon Hartley (Australia) Mark Webber**	**Porsche 919 Hybrid**	M	**185**
1	**LMP1**	**17**	**(Germany) Porsche Team**	**(Germany) Timo Bernhard (New Zealand) Brendon Hartley (Australia) Mark Webber**	**Porsche 2.0 L Turbo V4**	M	**185**
2	LMP1	7	(Germany) Audi Sport Team Joest	(Germany) André Lotterer (Switzerland) Marcel Fässler (France) Benoît Tréluyer	Audi R18 e-tron quattro	M	185
2	LMP1	7	(Germany) Audi Sport Team Joest	(Germany) André Lotterer (Switzerland) Marcel Fässler (France) Benoît Tréluyer	Audi TDI 4.0 L Turbo Diesel V6	M	185
3	LMP1	8	(Germany) Audi Sport Team Joest	(France) Loïc Duval (Brazil) Lucas di Grassi (United Kingdom) Oliver Jarvis	Audi R18 e-tron quattro	M	184
3	LMP1	8	(Germany) Audi Sport Team Joest	(France) Loïc Duval (Brazil) Lucas di Grassi (United Kingdom) Oliver Jarvis	Audi TDI 4.0 L Turbo Diesel V6	M	184
4	LMP1	1	(Japan) Toyota Racing	(United Kingdom) Anthony Davidson (Switzerland) Sébastien Buemi (Japan) Kazuki Nakajima	Toyota TS040 Hybrid	M	183
4	LMP1	1	(Japan) Toyota Racing	(United Kingdom) Anthony Davidson (Switzerland) Sébastien Buemi (Japan) Kazuki Nakajima	Toyota 3.7 L V8	M	183
5	**LMP2**	**26**	**(Russia) G-Drive Racing**	**(Russia) Roman Rusinov (France) Julien Canal (United Kingdom) Sam Bird**	**Ligier JS P2**	D	**170**
5	**LMP2**	**26**	**(Russia) G-Drive Racing**	**(Russia) Roman Rusinov (France) Julien Canal (United Kingdom) Sam Bird**	**Nissan VK45DE 4.5 L V8**	D	**170**
6	LMP2	47	(Hong Kong) KCMG	(United Kingdom) Matthew Howson (United Kingdom) Richard Bradley (France) Nicolas Lapierre	Oreca 05	D	170
6	LMP2	47	(Hong Kong) KCMG	(United Kingdom) Matthew Howson (United Kingdom) Richard Bradley (France) Nicolas Lapierre	Nissan VK45DE 4.5 L V8	D	170
7	LMP2	28	(Russia) G-Drive Racing	(Colombia) Gustavo Yacamán (Mexico) Ricardo González (Brazil) Pipo Derani	Ligier JS P2	D	169
7	LMP2	28	(Russia) G-Drive Racing	(Colombia) Gustavo Yacamán (Mexico) Ricardo González (Brazil) Pipo Derani	Nissan VK45DE 4.5 L V8	D	169
8	LMP1	4	(Austria) Team ByKolles	(Switzerland) Simon Trummer (Germany) Pierre Kaffer	CLM P1/01	M	169
8	LMP1	4	(Austria) Team ByKolles	(Switzerland) Simon Trummer (Germany) Pierre Kaffer	AER P60 2.4 L Turbo V6	M	169
9	LMP2	30	(United States) Extreme Speed Motorsports	(United States) Scott Sharp (United Kingdom) Ryan Dalziel (Denmark) David Heinemeier Hansson	Ligier JS P2	D	169
9	LMP2	30	(United States) Extreme Speed Motorsports	(United States) Scott Sharp (United Kingdom) Ryan Dalziel (Denmark) David Heinemeier Hansson	Honda HR28TT 2.8 L Turbo V6	D	169
10	LMP2	43	(Switzerland) Team SARD Morand	(United Kingdom) Oliver Webb (France) Pierre Ragues (United Kingdom) Archie Hamilton	Morgan LMP2 Evo	D	169
10	LMP2	43	(Switzerland) Team SARD Morand	(United Kingdom) Oliver Webb (France) Pierre Ragues (United Kingdom) Archie Hamilton	SARD 3.6 L V8	D	169
11	LMP2	36	(France) Signatech Alpine	(France) Nelson Panciatici (France) Paul-Loup Chatin (France) Vincent Capillaire	Alpine A450b	D	169
11	LMP2	36	(France) Signatech Alpine	(France) Nelson Panciatici (France) Paul-Loup Chatin (France) Vincent Capillaire	Nissan VK45DE 4.5 L V8	D	169
12	LMP1	18	(Germany) Porsche Team	(Germany) Marc Lieb (France) Romain Dumas (Switzerland) Neel Jani	Porsche 919 Hybrid	M	168
12	LMP1	18	(Germany) Porsche Team	(Germany) Marc Lieb (France) Romain Dumas (Switzerland) Neel Jani	Porsche 2.0 L Turbo V4	M	168
13	LMP2	42	(United Kingdom) Strakka Racing	(United Kingdom) Nick Leventis (United Kingdom) Jonny Kane (United Kingdom) Danny Watts	Gibson 015S	D	166
13	LMP2	42	(United Kingdom) Strakka Racing	(United Kingdom) Nick Leventis (United Kingdom) Jonny Kane (United Kingdom) Danny Watts	Nissan VK45DE 4.5 L V8	D	166
14	**LMGTE; Pro**	**91**	**(Germany) Porsche Team Manthey**	**(Austria) Richard Lietz (Denmark) Michael Christensen**	**Porsche 911 RSR**	M	**162**
14	**LMGTE; Pro**	**91**	**(Germany) Porsche Team Manthey**	**(Austria) Richard Lietz (Denmark) Michael Christensen**	**Porsche 4.0 L Flat-6**	M	**162**
15	LMGTE; Pro	92	(Germany) Porsche Team Manthey	(France) Patrick Pilet (France) Frédéric Makowiecki	Porsche 911 RSR	M	162
15	LMGTE; Pro	92	(Germany) Porsche Team Manthey	(France) Patrick Pilet (France) Frédéric Makowiecki	Porsche 4.0 L Flat-6	M	162
16	LMGTE; Pro	71	(Italy) AF Corse	(Italy) Davide Rigon (United Kingdom) James Calado	Ferrari 458 Italia GT2	M	162
16	LMGTE; Pro	71	(Italy) AF Corse	(Italy) Davide Rigon (United Kingdom) James Calado	Ferrari 4.5 L V8	M	162
17	LMGTE; Pro	99	(United Kingdom) Aston Martin Racing V8	(Brazil) Fernando Rees (United Kingdom) Alex MacDowall (New Zealand) Richie Stanaway	Aston Martin V8 Vantage GTE	M	161
17	LMGTE; Pro	99	(United Kingdom) Aston Martin Racing V8	(Brazil) Fernando Rees (United Kingdom) Alex MacDowall (New Zealand) Richie Stanaway	Aston Martin 4.5 L V8	M	161
18	LMGTE; Pro	95	(United Kingdom) Aston Martin Racing	(Denmark) Christoffer Nygaard (Denmark) Marco Sørensen	Aston Martin V8 Vantage GTE	M	160
18	LMGTE; Pro	95	(United Kingdom) Aston Martin Racing	(Denmark) Christoffer Nygaard (Denmark) Marco Sørensen	Aston Martin 4.5 L V8	M	160
19	LMGTE; Pro	97	(United Kingdom) Aston Martin Racing	(United Kingdom) Darren Turner (United Kingdom) Jonathan Adam	Aston Martin V8 Vantage GTE	M	160
19	LMGTE; Pro	97	(United Kingdom) Aston Martin Racing	(United Kingdom) Darren Turner (United Kingdom) Jonathan Adam	Aston Martin 4.5 L V8	M	160
20	LMGTE; Pro	51	(Italy) AF Corse	(Italy) Gianmaria Bruni (Finland) Toni Vilander	Ferrari 458 Italia GT2	M	160
20	LMGTE; Pro	51	(Italy) AF Corse	(Italy) Gianmaria Bruni (Finland) Toni Vilander	Ferrari 4.5 L V8	M	160
21	**LMGTE; Am**	**72**	**(Russia) SMP Racing**	**(Russia) Viktor Shaitar (Russia) Aleksey Basov (Italy) Andrea Bertolini**	**Ferrari 458 Italia GT2**	M	**159**
21	**LMGTE; Am**	**72**	**(Russia) SMP Racing**	**(Russia) Viktor Shaitar (Russia) Aleksey Basov (Italy) Andrea Bertolini**	**Ferrari 4.5 L V8**	M	**159**
22	LMGTE; Am	88	(Germany) Abu Dhabi-Proton Racing	(Germany) Christian Ried (New Zealand) Earl Bamber (United Arab Emirates) Khaled Al Qubaisi	Porsche 911 RSR	M	159
22	LMGTE; Am	88	(Germany) Abu Dhabi-Proton Racing	(Germany) Christian Ried (New Zealand) Earl Bamber (United Arab Emirates) Khaled Al Qubaisi	Porsche 4.0 L Flat-6	M	159
23	LMGTE; Am	83	(Italy) AF Corse	(France) François Perrodo (France) Emmanuel Collard (Portugal) Rui Águas	Ferrari 458 Italia GT2	M	158
23	LMGTE; Am	83	(Italy) AF Corse	(France) François Perrodo (France) Emmanuel Collard (Portugal) Rui Águas	Ferrari 4.5 L V8	M	158
24	LMGTE; Am	77	(Germany) Dempsey Racing-Proton	(United States) Patrick Dempsey (United States) Patrick Long (Germany) Marco Seefried	Porsche 911 RSR	M	158
24	LMGTE; Am	77	(Germany) Dempsey Racing-Proton	(United States) Patrick Dempsey (United States) Patrick Long (Germany) Marco Seefried	Porsche 4.0 L Flat-6	M	158
25	LMGTE; Am	98	(United Kingdom) Aston Martin Racing	(Canada) Paul Dalla Lana (Portugal) Pedro Lamy (Austria) Mathias Lauda	Aston Martin V8 Vantage GTE	M	158
25	LMGTE; Am	98	(United Kingdom) Aston Martin Racing	(Canada) Paul Dalla Lana (Portugal) Pedro Lamy (Austria) Mathias Lauda	Aston Martin 4.5 L V8	M	158
26	LMGTE; Am	96	(United Kingdom) Aston Martin Racing	(Denmark) Benny Simonsen (United Kingdom) Stuart Hall (Italy) Francesco Castellacci	Aston Martin V8 Vantage GTE	M	158
26	LMGTE; Am	96	(United Kingdom) Aston Martin Racing	(Denmark) Benny Simonsen (United Kingdom) Stuart Hall (Italy) Francesco Castellacci	Aston Martin 4.5 L V8	M	158
27	LMGTE; Am	50	(France) Larbre Compétition	(Italy) Gianluca Roda (Italy) Paolo Ruberti (Denmark) Kristian Poulsen	Chevrolet Corvette C7.R	M	157
27	LMGTE; Am	50	(France) Larbre Compétition	(Italy) Gianluca Roda (Italy) Paolo Ruberti (Denmark) Kristian Poulsen	Chevrolet 5.5 L V8	M	157
28	LMP1	13	(Switzerland) Rebellion Racing	(Austria) Dominik Kraihamer (Switzerland) Alexandre Imperatori (Germany) Daniel Abt	Rebellion R-One	M	147
28	LMP1	13	(Switzerland) Rebellion Racing	(Austria) Dominik Kraihamer (Switzerland) Alexandre Imperatori (Germany) Daniel Abt	AER P60 2.4 L Turbo V6	M	147
29	LMP1	12	(Switzerland) Rebellion Racing	(France) Nicolas Prost (Germany) Nick Heidfeld (Switzerland) Mathias Beche	Rebellion R-One	M	147
29	LMP1	12	(Switzerland) Rebellion Racing	(France) Nicolas Prost (Germany) Nick Heidfeld (Switzerland) Mathias Beche	AER P60 2.4 L Turbo V6	M	147
DNF	LMP1	2	(Japan) Toyota Racing	(Austria) Alexander Wurz (France) Stéphane Sarrazin (United Kingdom) Mike Conway	Toyota TS040 Hybrid	M	89
DNF	LMP1	2	(Japan) Toyota Racing	(Austria) Alexander Wurz (France) Stéphane Sarrazin (United Kingdom) Mike Conway	Toyota 3.7 L V8	M	89
DNF	LMP2	31	(United States) Extreme Speed Motorsports	(United States) Ed Brown (United States) Johannes van Overbeek (United States) Jon Fogarty	Ligier JS P2	D	54
DNF	LMP2	31	(United States) Extreme Speed Motorsports	(United States) Ed Brown (United States) Johannes van Overbeek (United States) Jon Fogarty	Honda HR28TT 2.8 L Turbo V6	D	54

FIA World Endurance Championship
Previous race: 6 Hours of Nürburgring	2015 season	Next race: 6 Hours of Fuji
