= 2015 FIA World Endurance Championship =

Auto racing series

- Organizer: Fédération Internationale de l'Automobile; Automobile Club de l'Ouest
- Discipline: Sports car endurance racing
- Number of races: 8

Champions
- LMP1 Manufacturer: (Germany) Porsche
- GTE Manufacturer: (Germany) Porsche
- LMP1 Team: (Switzerland) Rebellion Racing
- LMP2 Team: (Russia) G-Drive Racing
- LMGTE Pro Team: (Germany) Porsche Team Manthey
- LMGTE Am Team: (Russia) SMP Racing

FIA World Endurance Championship
- ← 2014 2016 →

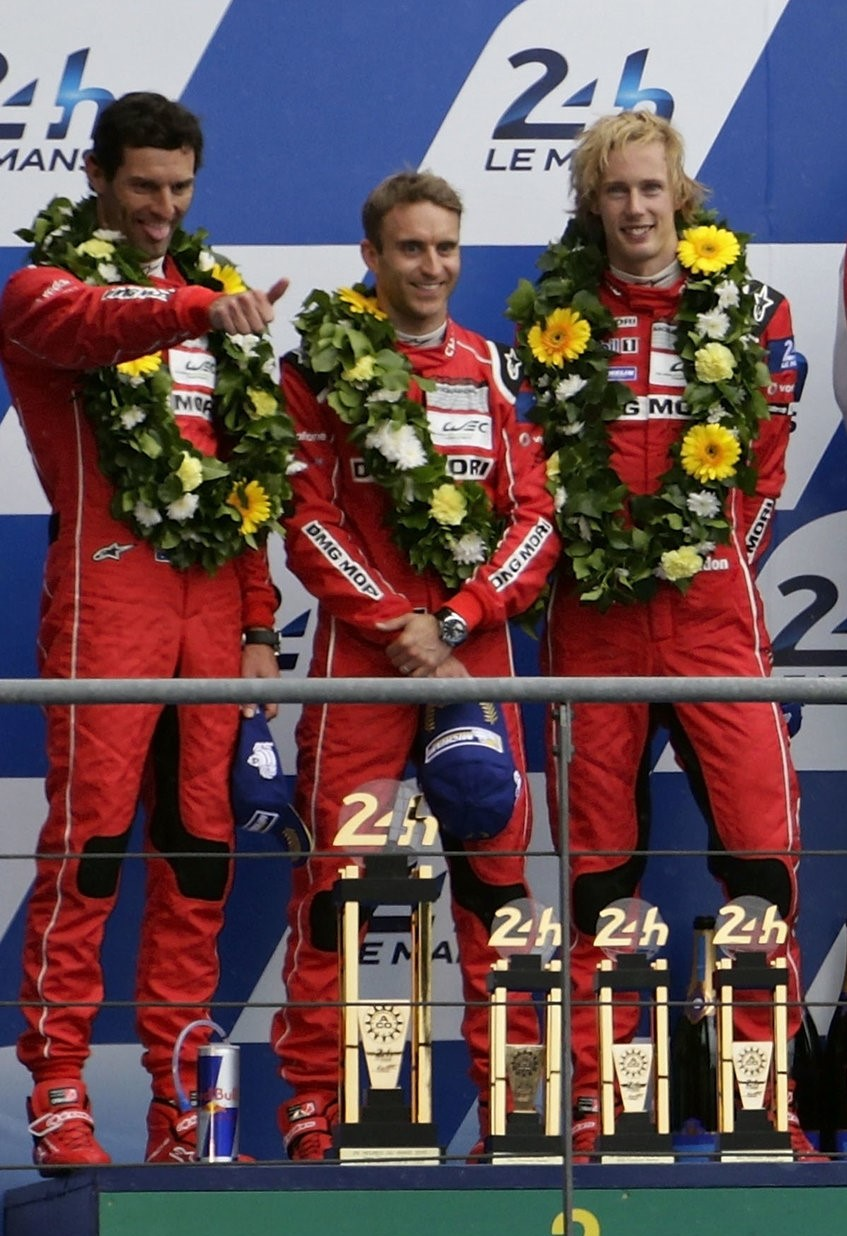
Mark Webber, Timo Bernhard, and Brendon Hartley won the Drivers Championship

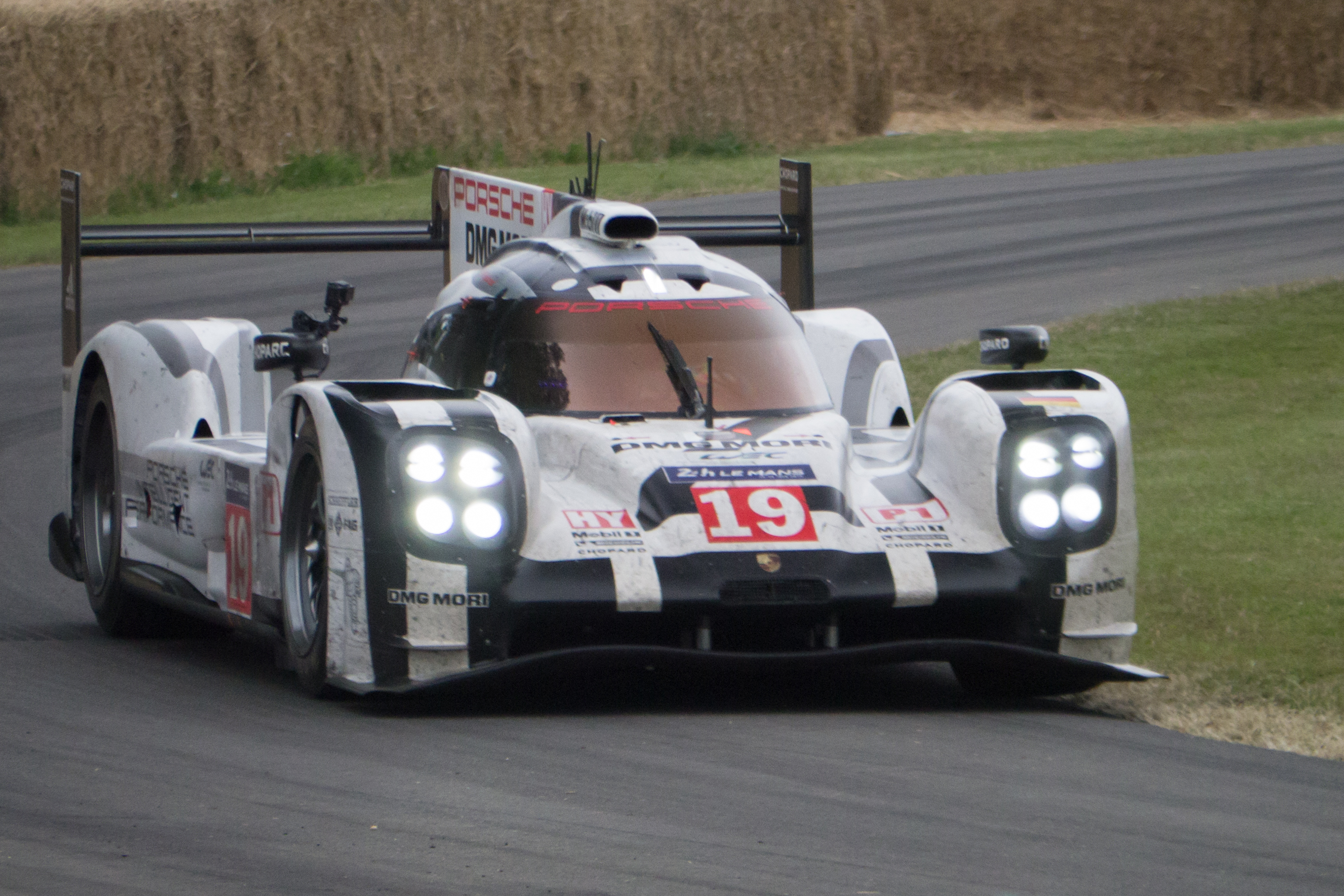
Porsche won the Manufacturers Championship with its 919 Hybrid entries

The 2015 FIA World Endurance Championship season was the fourth season of the FIA World Endurance Championship auto racing series, co-organized by the Fédération Internationale de l'Automobile (FIA) and the Automobile Club de l'Ouest (ACO). The series was open to Le Mans Prototypes and grand tourer-style racing cars meeting four ACO categories. World championship titles were awarded for Le Mans Prototypes drivers and for manufacturers in the LMP1 category, and several World Endurance Cups and Endurance Trophies were also awarded in all four categories. The season began at the Silverstone Circuit in April and ended at the Bahrain International Circuit in November after eight rounds, and included the 83rd running of the 24 Hours of Le Mans.

Porsche secured the World Manufacturers' Championship at the 6 Hours of Shanghai, beating Audi by eighty points. Porsche's Timo Bernhard, Mark Webber, and Brendon Hartley won the World Drivers' Championship in the final round of the season, ahead of Audi's André Lotterer, Benoît Tréluyer, and Marcel Fässler. Porsche teammates Marc Lieb, Romain Dumas, and Neel Jani were third in the championship standings. Bernhard, Webber, and Hartley won four consecutive races over the course of the season. Porsche also won the World Endurance Cup for GT Manufacturers in the final event, overcoming the lead held by Ferrari earlier in the season. Richard Lietz of Porsche won the World Endurance Cup for GT Drivers over three-time defending Cup winner Gianmaria Bruni and his teammate Toni Vilander.

Rebellion Racing and their drivers Mathias Beche and Nicolas Prost won the trophies for LMP1 class private entries despite not participating in the first two rounds of the championship. The championships were Rebellion's fourth and Beche and Prost's second consecutive trophy titles respectively. Roman Rusinov, Julien Canal, and Sam Bird of G-Drive Racing secured the LMP2 class trophies over the KCMG team. Porsche Team Manthey won the LMGTE Professional category trophy for teams over Ferrari representative AF Corse. The LMGTE Amateur category trophies were won by SMP Racing and their drivers Viktor Shaitar, Aleksey Basov, and Andrea Bertolini, ahead of AF Corse's LMGTE Am entry.

== Schedule ==
A provisional calendar was announced by the ACO at the 2014 6 Hours of Fuji and confirmed at the FIA World Motor Sport Council meeting in Doha shortly after. The schedule remained much the same as 2014, with the notable exception of the 6 Hours of São Paulo being replaced by the 6 Hours of Nürburgring. The planned construction of a new pit complex at the Autódromo José Carlos Pace precluded the event from returning in 2015. The Nürburgring round was the series' first visit to Germany and took place between the 24 Hours of Le Mans and 6 Hours of Circuit of the Americas, shortening the over three-month gap that was part of the 2014 schedule by three weeks.

| Rnd | Race | Circuit | Location | Date |
|---|---|---|---|---|
| | Prologue | Circuit Paul Ricard | (France) Le Castellet, Var | 27/28 March |
| 1 | 6 Hours of Silverstone | Silverstone Circuit | (United Kingdom) Silverstone | 12 April |
| 2 | WEC 6 Heures de Spa-Francorchamps | Circuit de Spa-Francorchamps | (Belgium) Stavelot | 2 May |
| 3 | 24 Heures du Mans | Circuit de la Sarthe | (France) Le Mans | 13–14 June |
| 4 | 6 Hours of Nürburgring | Nürburgring | (Germany) Nürburg | 30 August |
| 5 | 6 Hours of Circuit of the Americas | Circuit of the Americas | (United States) Austin, Texas | 19 September |
| 6 | 6 Hours of Fuji | Fuji Speedway | (Japan) Oyama, Shizuoka | 11 October |
| 7 | 6 Hours of Shanghai | Shanghai International Circuit | (China) Shanghai | 1 November |
| 8 | Bapco 6 Hours of Bahrain | Bahrain International Circuit | (Bahrain) Sakhir | 21 November |

== Entries ==
The FIA unveiled an entry of 35 cars for the 2015 season on 5 February, divided into four categories: Le Mans Prototype 1 (LMP1) and 2 (LMP2), and Le Mans Grand Touring Endurance Professional (LMGTE Pro) and Amateur (LMGTE Am).

=== LMP1 ===
The LMP1-H and LMP1-L categories introduced in 2014 were merged once more into a single LMP1 category, allowing the privateer teams to again face the manufacturer teams. Nissan joined the LMP1 category as a manufacturer after supplying engines in LMP2 since the series' inception in 2012. The Nissan GT-R LM Nismo utilized a unique layout amongst the LMP1 field, with a front-engine design and a front-wheel drive powertrain. Nissan's drivers included FIA GT1 World Champion Michael Krumm, European Le Mans Series LMP2 champion Olivier Pla who moved from G-Drive Racing, and former Formula One driver Max Chilton. LMP2 veterans Harry Tincknell, Jann Mardenborough, and Alex Buncombe completed the team's full season line-up, while Lucas Ordóñez, Mark Shulzhitskiy, and defending Super GT champion Tsugio Matsuda drove the team's third entry for Le Mans.

Debutants in 2014, Porsche retained their line-up but added a third 919 Hybrid for Le Mans: current Force India Formula One driver Nico Hülkenberg joined Nick Tandy and Earl Bamber who were promoted from Porsche's LMGTE program.

With the retirement of 2013 World Endurance Drivers' champion Tom Kristensen, Audi promoted Oliver Jarvis to partner with Lucas di Grassi and Loïc Duval in an R18 e-tron quattro. The second Audi retained the same line-up which won the 2012 World Endurance Drivers' championship: Marcel Fässler, Benoît Tréluyer, and André Lotterer. René Rast moved from Audi's GT program to take Jarvis' vacated seat in the third Audi for Le Mans.

Defending World Endurance Drivers' champions Anthony Davidson and Sébastien Buemi gained a new co-driver at Toyota for 2015, as Kazuki Nakajima switched from the sister car to replace the departed Nicolas Lapierre. Nakajima's spot in the second TS040 Hybrid was filled by Mike Conway, promoted from reserve duty in 2014, to partner Stéphane Sarrazin and Alexander Wurz.

The two LMP1-L entries from 2014 remained into the new season but with alterations to their campaigns. Kodewa, previously entered under sponsorship with Lotus Cars, was renamed Team ByKolles for 2015. ByKolles retained the CLM P1/01 with AER power that they campaigned in the second half of 2014. Pierre Kaffer was retained alongside Simon Trummer who appeared with Kodewa for one race in 2014. Vitantonio Liuzzi returned to the team after having previously campaigned the Lotus in LMP2 in 2013. Rebellion Racing came into 2015 as the defending LMP1 Private Teams champions, but chose to forgo the Toyota engines for the same AER powerplant used by Team ByKolles. This decision forced Rebellion to withdraw from the first races of the season in order to adapt their R-Ones for the new motors. The No. 12 Rebellion's drivers remained unchanged, while the No. 13 added series rookie Daniel Abt and former KCMG LMP2 driver Alexandre Imperatori alongside team veteran Dominik Kraihamer.

Key
| Full-season entry | Additional entry | Third manufacturer entry |
| * Eligible for all championship points | * Eligible only for Drivers' championship points | * Eligible for Drivers' championship points * Only eligible for Manufacturers' championship points at Le Mans |

| Entrant/Team | Car | Engine | Hybrid | Tyre | No. | Drivers | Rounds |
|---|---|---|---|---|---|---|---|
| (Japan) Toyota Racing | Toyota TS040 Hybrid | Toyota RV8KLM 3.7 L V8 | Hybrid | M | 1 | (United Kingdom) Anthony Davidson | All |
| (Japan) Toyota Racing | Toyota TS040 Hybrid | Toyota RV8KLM 3.7 L V8 | Hybrid | M | 1 | (Switzerland) Sébastien Buemi | All |
| (Japan) Toyota Racing | Toyota TS040 Hybrid | Toyota RV8KLM 3.7 L V8 | Hybrid | M | 1 | (Japan) Kazuki Nakajima | All (Note: Nakajima was entered into round 2, but withdrew after practice due to an injury.) |
| (Japan) Toyota Racing | Toyota TS040 Hybrid | Toyota RV8KLM 3.7 L V8 | Hybrid | M | 2 | (Austria) Alexander Wurz | All |
| (Japan) Toyota Racing | Toyota TS040 Hybrid | Toyota RV8KLM 3.7 L V8 | Hybrid | M | 2 | (France) Stéphane Sarrazin | All |
| (Japan) Toyota Racing | Toyota TS040 Hybrid | Toyota RV8KLM 3.7 L V8 | Hybrid | M | 2 | (United Kingdom) Mike Conway | All |
| (Austria) Team ByKolles | CLM P1/01 | AER P60 2.0 L Turbo V6 | | M | 4 | (Switzerland) Simon Trummer | All |
| (Austria) Team ByKolles | CLM P1/01 | AER P60 2.0 L Turbo V6 | | M | 4 | (Italy) Vitantonio Liuzzi | 1–2 |
| (Austria) Team ByKolles | CLM P1/01 | AER P60 2.0 L Turbo V6 | | M | 4 | (Austria) Christian Klien | 1–2 |
| (Austria) Team ByKolles | CLM P1/01 | AER P60 2.0 L Turbo V6 | | M | 4 | (Portugal) Tiago Monteiro | 3 |
| (Austria) Team ByKolles | CLM P1/01 | AER P60 2.0 L Turbo V6 | | M | 4 | (Germany) Pierre Kaffer | 3–8 |
| (Germany) Audi Sport Team Joest | Audi R18 e-tron quattro | Audi TDI 4.0 L Turbo Diesel V6 | Hybrid | M | 7 | (Germany) André Lotterer | All |
| (Germany) Audi Sport Team Joest | Audi R18 e-tron quattro | Audi TDI 4.0 L Turbo Diesel V6 | Hybrid | M | 7 | (France) Benoît Tréluyer | All |
| (Germany) Audi Sport Team Joest | Audi R18 e-tron quattro | Audi TDI 4.0 L Turbo Diesel V6 | Hybrid | M | 7 | (Switzerland) Marcel Fässler | All |
| (Germany) Audi Sport Team Joest | Audi R18 e-tron quattro | Audi TDI 4.0 L Turbo Diesel V6 | Hybrid | M | 8 | (United Kingdom) Oliver Jarvis | All |
| (Germany) Audi Sport Team Joest | Audi R18 e-tron quattro | Audi TDI 4.0 L Turbo Diesel V6 | Hybrid | M | 8 | (Brazil) Lucas di Grassi | All |
| (Germany) Audi Sport Team Joest | Audi R18 e-tron quattro | Audi TDI 4.0 L Turbo Diesel V6 | Hybrid | M | 8 | (France) Loïc Duval | All |
| (Germany) Audi Sport Team Joest | Audi R18 e-tron quattro | Audi TDI 4.0 L Turbo Diesel V6 | Hybrid | M | 9 | (Italy) Marco Bonanomi | 2–3 |
| (Germany) Audi Sport Team Joest | Audi R18 e-tron quattro | Audi TDI 4.0 L Turbo Diesel V6 | Hybrid | M | 9 | (Portugal) Filipe Albuquerque | 2–3 |
| (Germany) Audi Sport Team Joest | Audi R18 e-tron quattro | Audi TDI 4.0 L Turbo Diesel V6 | Hybrid | M | 9 | (Germany) René Rast | 2–3 |
| (Switzerland) Rebellion Racing | Rebellion R-One | AER P60 2.0 L Turbo V6 | | M | 12 | (France) Nicolas Prost | 3–8 |
| (Switzerland) Rebellion Racing | Rebellion R-One | AER P60 2.0 L Turbo V6 | | M | 12 | (Switzerland) Mathias Beche | 3–8 |
| (Switzerland) Rebellion Racing | Rebellion R-One | AER P60 2.0 L Turbo V6 | | M | 12 | (Germany) Nick Heidfeld | 3–5 |
| (Switzerland) Rebellion Racing | Rebellion R-One | AER P60 2.0 L Turbo V6 | | M | 13 | (Austria) Dominik Kraihamer | 3–8 |
| (Switzerland) Rebellion Racing | Rebellion R-One | AER P60 2.0 L Turbo V6 | | M | 13 | (Switzerland) Alexandre Imperatori | 3–8 |
| (Switzerland) Rebellion Racing | Rebellion R-One | AER P60 2.0 L Turbo V6 | | M | 13 | (Germany) Daniel Abt | 3–6 |
| (Switzerland) Rebellion Racing | Rebellion R-One | AER P60 2.0 L Turbo V6 | | M | 13 | (Switzerland) Mathéo Tuscher | 7–8 |
| (Germany) Porsche Team | Porsche 919 Hybrid | Porsche 9R9 2.0 L Turbo V4 | Hybrid | M | 17 | (Germany) Timo Bernhard | All |
| (Germany) Porsche Team | Porsche 919 Hybrid | Porsche 9R9 2.0 L Turbo V4 | Hybrid | M | 17 | (Australia) Mark Webber | All |
| (Germany) Porsche Team | Porsche 919 Hybrid | Porsche 9R9 2.0 L Turbo V4 | Hybrid | M | 17 | (New Zealand) Brendon Hartley | All |
| (Germany) Porsche Team | Porsche 919 Hybrid | Porsche 9R9 2.0 L Turbo V4 | Hybrid | M | 18 | (France) Romain Dumas | All |
| (Germany) Porsche Team | Porsche 919 Hybrid | Porsche 9R9 2.0 L Turbo V4 | Hybrid | M | 18 | (Switzerland) Neel Jani | All |
| (Germany) Porsche Team | Porsche 919 Hybrid | Porsche 9R9 2.0 L Turbo V4 | Hybrid | M | 18 | (Germany) Marc Lieb | All |
| (Germany) Porsche Team | Porsche 919 Hybrid | Porsche 9R9 2.0 L Turbo V4 | Hybrid | M | 19 | (Germany) Nico Hülkenberg | 2–3 |
| (Germany) Porsche Team | Porsche 919 Hybrid | Porsche 9R9 2.0 L Turbo V4 | Hybrid | M | 19 | (New Zealand) Earl Bamber | 2–3 |
| (Germany) Porsche Team | Porsche 919 Hybrid | Porsche 9R9 2.0 L Turbo V4 | Hybrid | M | 19 | (United Kingdom) Nick Tandy | 2–3 |
| (Japan) Nissan Motorsports | Nissan GT-R LM Nismo | Nissan VRX30A 3.0 L Turbo V6 | Hybrid | M | 21 | (Japan) Tsugio Matsuda | 3 |
| (Japan) Nissan Motorsports | Nissan GT-R LM Nismo | Nissan VRX30A 3.0 L Turbo V6 | Hybrid | M | 21 | (Spain) Lucas Ordóñez | 3 |
| (Japan) Nissan Motorsports | Nissan GT-R LM Nismo | Nissan VRX30A 3.0 L Turbo V6 | Hybrid | M | 21 | (Russia) Mark Shulzhitskiy | 3 |
| (Japan) Nissan Motorsports | Nissan GT-R LM Nismo | Nissan VRX30A 3.0 L Turbo V6 | Hybrid | M | 22 | (United Kingdom) Harry Tincknell | 3 |
| (Japan) Nissan Motorsports | Nissan GT-R LM Nismo | Nissan VRX30A 3.0 L Turbo V6 | Hybrid | M | 22 | (United Kingdom) Alex Buncombe | 3 |
| (Japan) Nissan Motorsports | Nissan GT-R LM Nismo | Nissan VRX30A 3.0 L Turbo V6 | Hybrid | M | 22 | (Germany) Michael Krumm | 3 |
| (Japan) Nissan Motorsports | Nissan GT-R LM Nismo | Nissan VRX30A 3.0 L Turbo V6 | Hybrid | M | 23 | (France) Olivier Pla | 3 |
| (Japan) Nissan Motorsports | Nissan GT-R LM Nismo | Nissan VRX30A 3.0 L Turbo V6 | Hybrid | M | 23 | (United Kingdom) Jann Mardenborough | 3 |
| (Japan) Nissan Motorsports | Nissan GT-R LM Nismo | Nissan VRX30A 3.0 L Turbo V6 | Hybrid | M | 23 | (United Kingdom) Max Chilton | 3 |

Notes:

- Marc Gené was scheduled to compete for Nissan Motorsports, but later stepped back into an advisory role. Nissan reshuffled its lineup as a result, with Mark Shulzhitskiy joining the team.

=== LMP2 ===
After the LMP2 field in 2014 was the smallest in the history of the WEC, with only four cars competing for the full season despite an initial seven entries in the category, the class regained popularity with ten entries for 2015. Even with an increase in cars, defending LMP2 champions SMP Racing and driver Sergey Zlobin opted not to return, instead focusing on the European Le Mans Series to develop their new BR01 chassis. 2013 LMP2 champions OAK Racing returned to the series under their own banner for team owner and driver Jacques Nicolet, while their G-Drive Racing operation which won four races in 2014 expanded to a two-car operation in 2015. Sam Bird replaced Olivier Pla in the first G-Drive entry alongside Roman Rusinov and Julien Canal, while Gustavo Yacamán, Ricardo González, and Pipo Derani shared the second car. All three entries used the Ligier JS P2-Nissan combination. KCMG also remained in the series for 2015, replacing their Oreca 03 with the newer 05 chassis. Porsche driver Nick Tandy joined KCMG for part of the season when not driving the third Porsche LMP1, while Richard Bradley and Matthew Howson remained with the squad. Former Toyota LMP1 driver Nicolas Lapierre serve as Tandy's replacement when he was unavailable. Strakka Racing, who had filed a full-season entry in 2014 but failed to participate after development delays with their Strakka-Dome S103 chassis, returned for 2015 with an unchanged program. Strakka were the only team campaigning Michelin tyres in LMP2 before switching to the Dunlops used by the rest of the category.

Defending European Le Mans Series champions Signatech retained drivers' champions Nelson Panciatici and Paul-Loup Chatin and added Vincent Capillaire to the team. The team, which previously participated in 2012, had backing from Alpine with their Oreca-based A450 chassis with Nissan power. Morand Racing also shifted from the European Le Mans Series, partnering with the Japanese firm SARD in a joint effort. The team initially entered two improved versions of the Morgan LMP2 with Judd engines, but funding issues forced the team to downsize to a single entry. Former European Le Mans Series drivers' champion Oliver Webb jumped from Signatech to SARD Morand with Pierre Ragues and rookie Zoël Amberg. Extreme Speed Motorsports was the only North American-representative in the series, shifting from the United SportsCar Championship to the WEC with their HPD-Hondas. In 2014, as not full-season entrants eligible for points, the team entered with a single car at the 2014 6 Hours of Circuit of the Americas, and then entered two cars in the 6 Hours of Shanghai, where those two events served as preparation for a full season entry in 2015. Team owner Scott Sharp joined Ryan Dalziel, who secured an LMP2 championship for Starworks Motorsport in the 2012 WEC, and David Heinemeier Hansson, who won the LMGTE Am Drivers' championship in 2014. The second HPD-Honda was crewed by Johannes van Overbeek, Ed Brown, and former Rolex Sports Car Series champion Jon Fogarty.

| Entrant/Team | Car | Engine | Tyre | No. | Drivers | Rounds |
|---|---|---|---|---|---|---|
| (Russia) G-Drive Racing | Ligier JS P2 | Nissan VK45DE 4.5 L V8 | D | 26 | (Russia) Roman Rusinov | All |
| (Russia) G-Drive Racing | Ligier JS P2 | Nissan VK45DE 4.5 L V8 | D | 26 | (France) Julien Canal | All |
| (Russia) G-Drive Racing | Ligier JS P2 | Nissan VK45DE 4.5 L V8 | D | 26 | (United Kingdom) Sam Bird | All |
| (Russia) G-Drive Racing | Ligier JS P2 | Nissan VK45DE 4.5 L V8 | D | 28 | (Colombia) Gustavo Yacamán | All |
| (Russia) G-Drive Racing | Ligier JS P2 | Nissan VK45DE 4.5 L V8 | D | 28 | (Mexico) Ricardo González | All |
| (Russia) G-Drive Racing | Ligier JS P2 | Nissan VK45DE 4.5 L V8 | D | 28 | (Brazil) Pipo Derani | All |
| (United States) Extreme Speed Motorsports | HPD ARX-03b; Ligier JS P2 | Honda HR28TT 2.8 L Turbo V6 | D | 30 | (United States) Scott Sharp | All |
| (United States) Extreme Speed Motorsports | HPD ARX-03b; Ligier JS P2 | Honda HR28TT 2.8 L Turbo V6 | D | 30 | (United Kingdom) Ryan Dalziel | All |
| (United States) Extreme Speed Motorsports | HPD ARX-03b; Ligier JS P2 | Honda HR28TT 2.8 L Turbo V6 | D | 30 | (Denmark) David Heinemeier Hansson | All |
| (United States) Extreme Speed Motorsports | HPD ARX-03b; Ligier JS P2 | Honda HR28TT 2.8 L Turbo V6 | D | 31 | (United States) Ed Brown | All |
| (United States) Extreme Speed Motorsports | HPD ARX-03b; Ligier JS P2 | Honda HR28TT 2.8 L Turbo V6 | D | 31 | (United States) Jon Fogarty | All |
| (United States) Extreme Speed Motorsports | HPD ARX-03b; Ligier JS P2 | Honda HR28TT 2.8 L Turbo V6 | D | 31 | (Australia) David Brabham | 1 |
| (United States) Extreme Speed Motorsports | HPD ARX-03b; Ligier JS P2 | Honda HR28TT 2.8 L Turbo V6 | D | 31 | (United States) Johannes van Overbeek | 2–8 |
| (France) OAK Racing | Ligier JS P2 | Honda HR28TT 2.8 L Turbo V6 | D | 34 | (Canada) Chris Cumming | 3 |
| (France) OAK Racing | Ligier JS P2 | Honda HR28TT 2.8 L Turbo V6 | D | 34 | (France) Kévin Estre | 3 |
| (France) OAK Racing | Ligier JS P2 | Honda HR28TT 2.8 L Turbo V6 | D | 34 | (Belgium) Laurens Vanthoor | 3 |
| (France) OAK Racing | Ligier JS P2 | Nissan VK45DE 4.5 L V8 | D | 35 | (France) Jacques Nicolet | 1–3 |
| (France) OAK Racing | Ligier JS P2 | Nissan VK45DE 4.5 L V8 | D | 35 | (France) Jean-Marc Merlin | 1–3 |
| (France) OAK Racing | Ligier JS P2 | Nissan VK45DE 4.5 L V8 | D | 35 | (France) Erik Maris | 1–3 |
| (France) Signatech Alpine | Alpine A450b | Nissan VK45DE 4.5 L V8 | D | 36 | (France) Nelson Panciatici | All |
| (France) Signatech Alpine | Alpine A450b | Nissan VK45DE 4.5 L V8 | D | 36 | (France) Paul-Loup Chatin | All |
| (France) Signatech Alpine | Alpine A450b | Nissan VK45DE 4.5 L V8 | D | 36 | (France) Vincent Capillaire | 1–6 |
| (France) Signatech Alpine | Alpine A450b | Nissan VK45DE 4.5 L V8 | D | 36 | (France) Tom Dillmann | 7–8 |
| (United Kingdom) Strakka Racing | Strakka-Dome S103; Gibson 015S | Nissan VK45DE 4.5 L V8 | M D | 42 | (United Kingdom) Nick Leventis | All |
| (United Kingdom) Strakka Racing | Strakka-Dome S103; Gibson 015S | Nissan VK45DE 4.5 L V8 | M D | 42 | (United Kingdom) Jonny Kane | All |
| (United Kingdom) Strakka Racing | Strakka-Dome S103; Gibson 015S | Nissan VK45DE 4.5 L V8 | M D | 42 | (United Kingdom) Danny Watts | All |
| (Switzerland) Team SARD Morand | Morgan LMP2 Evo | SARD HK 3.6 L V8 | D | 43 | (United Kingdom) Oliver Webb | 2–8 |
| (Switzerland) Team SARD Morand | Morgan LMP2 Evo | SARD HK 3.6 L V8 | D | 43 | (France) Pierre Ragues | 2–8 |
| (Switzerland) Team SARD Morand | Morgan LMP2 Evo | SARD HK 3.6 L V8 | D | 43 | (Switzerland) Zoël Amberg | 2–3 |
| (Switzerland) Team SARD Morand | Morgan LMP2 Evo | SARD HK 3.6 L V8 | D | 43 | (United Kingdom) Archie Hamilton | 4–5 |
| (Switzerland) Team SARD Morand | Morgan LMP2 Evo | SARD HK 3.6 L V8 | D | 43 | (Canada) Chris Cumming | 6–8 |
| (Hong Kong) KCMG | Oreca 05 | Nissan VK45DE 4.5 L V8 | D | 47 | (United Kingdom) Matthew Howson | All |
| (Hong Kong) KCMG | Oreca 05 | Nissan VK45DE 4.5 L V8 | D | 47 | (United Kingdom) Richard Bradley | All |
| (Hong Kong) KCMG | Oreca 05 | Nissan VK45DE 4.5 L V8 | D | 47 | (United Kingdom) Nick Tandy | 1, 4, 6–8 |
| (Hong Kong) KCMG | Oreca 05 | Nissan VK45DE 4.5 L V8 | D | 47 | (France) Nicolas Lapierre | 2–3, 5 |

=== LMGTE Pro ===
The LMGTE Pro category remained largely unchanged from 2014 as Porsche, Ferrari, and Aston Martin remained the sole manufacturers involved. Three-time LMGTE champions AF Corse's Ferraris had a near identical line-up as Gianmaria Bruni and Toni Vilander defended their titles in the lead car, while James Calado and Davide Rigon remained in the second Ferrari. Porsche Team Manthey also kept the drivers for its two cars largely unchanged. Frédéric Makowiecki, Patrick Pilet, and Wolf Henzler shared the No. 92, while Jörg Bergmeister and Richard Lietz remained in the No. 91. Michael Christensen was the newcomer to the No. 91, replacing the promoted Nick Tandy. Aston Martin Racing expanded their effort to three cars for 2015 after partner Young Driver's entry, which won the LMGTE Am category in 2014, moved to the Pro class. The all-Danish line-up of Nicki Thiim and Christoffer Nygaard were joined by newcomer Marco Sørensen. Robert Bell took over Bruno Senna's seat alongside Stefan Mücke and Darren Turner, while Alex MacDowall and Fernando Rees were joined by Richie Stanaway, promoted from Aston Martin's LMGTE Am line-up the previous season.

| Entrant/Team | Car | Engine | Tyre | No. | Drivers | Rounds |
|---|---|---|---|---|---|---|
| (Italy) AF Corse | Ferrari 458 Italia GT2 | Ferrari F136 4.5 L V8 | M | 51 | (Italy) Gianmaria Bruni | All |
| (Italy) AF Corse | Ferrari 458 Italia GT2 | Ferrari F136 4.5 L V8 | M | 51 | (Finland) Toni Vilander | All |
| (Italy) AF Corse | Ferrari 458 Italia GT2 | Ferrari F136 4.5 L V8 | M | 51 | (Italy) Giancarlo Fisichella | 3 |
| (Italy) AF Corse | Ferrari 458 Italia GT2 | Ferrari F136 4.5 L V8 | M | 71 | (Italy) Davide Rigon | All |
| (Italy) AF Corse | Ferrari 458 Italia GT2 | Ferrari F136 4.5 L V8 | M | 71 | (United Kingdom) James Calado | All |
| (Italy) AF Corse | Ferrari 458 Italia GT2 | Ferrari F136 4.5 L V8 | M | 71 | (Monaco) Olivier Beretta | 3 |
| (Germany) Porsche Team Manthey | Porsche 911 RSR | Porsche M97/80 4.0 L Flat-6 | M | 91 | (Austria) Richard Lietz | 1, 3–8 |
| (Germany) Porsche Team Manthey | Porsche 911 RSR | Porsche M97/80 4.0 L Flat-6 | M | 91 | (Denmark) Michael Christensen | 1, 3–8 |
| (Germany) Porsche Team Manthey | Porsche 911 RSR | Porsche M97/80 4.0 L Flat-6 | M | 91 | (Germany) Sven Müller | 2 |
| (Germany) Porsche Team Manthey | Porsche 911 RSR | Porsche M97/80 4.0 L Flat-6 | M | 91 | (France) Kévin Estre | 2 |
| (Germany) Porsche Team Manthey | Porsche 911 RSR | Porsche M97/80 4.0 L Flat-6 | M | 91 | (Germany) Jörg Bergmeister | 3 |
| (Germany) Porsche Team Manthey | Porsche 911 RSR | Porsche M97/80 4.0 L Flat-6 | M | 92 | (France) Frédéric Makowiecki | All |
| (Germany) Porsche Team Manthey | Porsche 911 RSR | Porsche M97/80 4.0 L Flat-6 | M | 92 | (France) Patrick Pilet | 1, 3–8 |
| (Germany) Porsche Team Manthey | Porsche 911 RSR | Porsche M97/80 4.0 L Flat-6 | M | 92 | (Austria) Richard Lietz | 2 |
| (Germany) Porsche Team Manthey | Porsche 911 RSR | Porsche M97/80 4.0 L Flat-6 | M | 92 | (Germany) Wolf Henzler | 3 |
| (United Kingdom) Aston Martin Racing | Aston Martin Vantage GTE | Aston Martin AM05 4.5 L V8 | M | 95 | (Denmark) Marco Sørensen | 1–6, 8 |
| (United Kingdom) Aston Martin Racing | Aston Martin Vantage GTE | Aston Martin AM05 4.5 L V8 | M | 95 | (Denmark) Christoffer Nygaard | 1–6, 8 |
| (United Kingdom) Aston Martin Racing | Aston Martin Vantage GTE | Aston Martin AM05 4.5 L V8 | M | 95 | (Denmark) Nicki Thiim | 1, 3, 8 |
| (United Kingdom) Aston Martin Racing | Aston Martin Vantage GTE | Aston Martin AM05 4.5 L V8 | M | 97 | (United Kingdom) Darren Turner | All |
| (United Kingdom) Aston Martin Racing | Aston Martin Vantage GTE | Aston Martin AM05 4.5 L V8 | M | 97 | (Germany) Stefan Mücke | 1–4 |
| (United Kingdom) Aston Martin Racing | Aston Martin Vantage GTE | Aston Martin AM05 4.5 L V8 | M | 97 | (United Kingdom) Robert Bell | 2–3 |
| (United Kingdom) Aston Martin Racing | Aston Martin Vantage GTE | Aston Martin AM05 4.5 L V8 | M | 97 | (United Kingdom) Jonathan Adam | 4–8 |
| (United Kingdom) Aston Martin Racing V8 | Aston Martin Vantage GTE | Aston Martin AM05 4.5 L V8 | M | 99 | (Brazil) Fernando Rees | All |
| (United Kingdom) Aston Martin Racing V8 | Aston Martin Vantage GTE | Aston Martin AM05 4.5 L V8 | M | 99 | (United Kingdom) Alex MacDowall | All |
| (United Kingdom) Aston Martin Racing V8 | Aston Martin Vantage GTE | Aston Martin AM05 4.5 L V8 | M | 99 | (New Zealand) Richie Stanaway | 1–5, 7–8 |
| (United Kingdom) Aston Martin Racing V8 | Aston Martin Vantage GTE | Aston Martin AM05 4.5 L V8 | M | 99 | (Germany) Stefan Mücke | 6 |

=== LMGTE Am ===
The field in LMGTE Am featured teams which had experience in the WEC. Aston Martin Racing retained their two-car entry, with Paul Dalla Lana and Pedro Lamy's car joined by newcomer Mathias Lauda, and Roald Goethe and Stuart Hall returned to the series for the first time since 2013, adding former FIA GT3 European Champion Francesco Castellacci. AF Corse also remained in the category, downgrading from a two-car entry to a single car for 2015. François Perrodo and Emmanuel Collard moved from the departed Prospeed Competition Porsche team to campaign AF Corse's Ferrari alongside Rui Águas. Proton Racing kept their entry with Christian Ried, Klaus Bachler, and Khaled Al Qubaisi, while a second Porsche was added to the squad for actor Patrick Dempsey alongside Porsche factory driver Patrick Long and Marco Seefried. SMP Racing remained in the championship despite not defending their LMP2 championship titles. Viktor Shaytar moved from the LMP2 program to the team's Ferrari while being joined by newcomer to the series Aleksey Basov and Ferrari factory driver Andrea Bertolini. 2012 LMGTE Am Teams' champions Larbre Compétition returned to the series for the first time since 2013, campaigning the first customer Chevrolet Corvette C7.R. Gianluca Roda and Paolo Ruberti joined the team after 8 Star Motorsports did not return to the series along with 2014 LMGTE Am Drivers' champion Kristian Poulsen.

| Entrant/Team | Car | Engine | Tyre | No. | Drivers | Rounds |
|---|---|---|---|---|---|---|
| (France) Larbre Compétition | Chevrolet Corvette C7.R | Chevrolet LT5.5R 5.5 L V8 | M | 50 | (Italy) Gianluca Roda | All |
| (France) Larbre Compétition | Chevrolet Corvette C7.R | Chevrolet LT5.5R 5.5 L V8 | M | 50 | (Italy) Paolo Ruberti | All |
| (France) Larbre Compétition | Chevrolet Corvette C7.R | Chevrolet LT5.5R 5.5 L V8 | M | 50 | (Denmark) Kristian Poulsen | 1–5, 8 |
| (France) Larbre Compétition | Chevrolet Corvette C7.R | Chevrolet LT5.5R 5.5 L V8 | M | 50 | (Denmark) Nicolai Sylvest | 6–7 |
| (Russia) SMP Racing | Ferrari 458 Italia GT2 | Ferrari F136 4.5 L V8 | M | 72 | (Russia) Viktor Shaytar | All |
| (Russia) SMP Racing | Ferrari 458 Italia GT2 | Ferrari F136 4.5 L V8 | M | 72 | (Russia) Aleksey Basov | All |
| (Russia) SMP Racing | Ferrari 458 Italia GT2 | Ferrari F136 4.5 L V8 | M | 72 | (Italy) Andrea Bertolini | All |
| (Germany) Dempsey Racing-Proton | Porsche 911 RSR | Porsche M97/80 4.0 L Flat-6 | M | 77 | (Germany) Marco Seefried | All |
| (Germany) Dempsey Racing-Proton | Porsche 911 RSR | Porsche M97/80 4.0 L Flat-6 | M | 77 | (United States) Patrick Long | All |
| (Germany) Dempsey Racing-Proton | Porsche 911 RSR | Porsche M97/80 4.0 L Flat-6 | M | 77 | (United States) Patrick Dempsey | 1–7 |
| (Germany) Dempsey Racing-Proton | Porsche 911 RSR | Porsche M97/80 4.0 L Flat-6 | M | 77 | (Germany) Christian Ried | 8 |
| (Germany) Abu Dhabi-Proton Racing | Porsche 911 RSR | Porsche M97/80 4.0 L Flat-6 | M | 88 | (United Arab Emirates) Khaled Al Qubaisi | All |
| (Germany) Abu Dhabi-Proton Racing | Porsche 911 RSR | Porsche M97/80 4.0 L Flat-6 | M | 88 | (Germany) Christian Ried | 1–7 |
| (Germany) Abu Dhabi-Proton Racing | Porsche 911 RSR | Porsche M97/80 4.0 L Flat-6 | M | 88 | (Austria) Klaus Bachler | 1–3, 7–8 |
| (Germany) Abu Dhabi-Proton Racing | Porsche 911 RSR | Porsche M97/80 4.0 L Flat-6 | M | 88 | (New Zealand) Earl Bamber | 4–6 |
| (Germany) Abu Dhabi-Proton Racing | Porsche 911 RSR | Porsche M97/80 4.0 L Flat-6 | M | 88 | (Italy) Marco Mapelli | 8 |
| (Italy) AF Corse | Ferrari 458 Italia GT2 | Ferrari F136 4.5 L V8 | M | 55 | (United Kingdom) Duncan Cameron | 2–3 |
| (Italy) AF Corse | Ferrari 458 Italia GT2 | Ferrari F136 4.5 L V8 | M | 55 | (United Kingdom) Alex Mortimer | 2–3 |
| (Italy) AF Corse | Ferrari 458 Italia GT2 | Ferrari F136 4.5 L V8 | M | 55 | (Republic of Ireland) Matt Griffin | 2–3 |
| (Italy) AF Corse | Ferrari 458 Italia GT2 | Ferrari F136 4.5 L V8 | M | 61 | (United States) Peter Ashley Mann | 3 |
| (Italy) AF Corse | Ferrari 458 Italia GT2 | Ferrari F136 4.5 L V8 | M | 61 | (Italy) Raffaele Giammaria | 3 |
| (Italy) AF Corse | Ferrari 458 Italia GT2 | Ferrari F136 4.5 L V8 | M | 61 | (Italy) Matteo Cressoni | 3 |
| (Italy) AF Corse | Ferrari 458 Italia GT2 | Ferrari F136 4.5 L V8 | M | 83 | (France) François Perrodo | All |
| (Italy) AF Corse | Ferrari 458 Italia GT2 | Ferrari F136 4.5 L V8 | M | 83 | (France) Emmanuel Collard | All |
| (Italy) AF Corse | Ferrari 458 Italia GT2 | Ferrari F136 4.5 L V8 | M | 83 | (Portugal) Rui Águas | 1–7 |
| (Italy) AF Corse | Ferrari 458 Italia GT2 | Ferrari F136 4.5 L V8 | M | 83 | (Italy) Matteo Cressoni | 8 |
| (United Kingdom) Aston Martin Racing | Aston Martin Vantage GTE | Aston Martin AM05 4.5 L V8 | M | 96 | (United Kingdom) Stuart Hall | All |
| (United Kingdom) Aston Martin Racing | Aston Martin Vantage GTE | Aston Martin AM05 4.5 L V8 | M | 96 | (Italy) Francesco Castellacci | All |
| (United Kingdom) Aston Martin Racing | Aston Martin Vantage GTE | Aston Martin AM05 4.5 L V8 | M | 96 | (Germany) Roald Goethe | 1–4, 8 |
| (United Kingdom) Aston Martin Racing | Aston Martin Vantage GTE | Aston Martin AM05 4.5 L V8 | M | 96 | (Denmark) Benny Simonsen | 5 |
| (United Kingdom) Aston Martin Racing | Aston Martin Vantage GTE | Aston Martin AM05 4.5 L V8 | M | 96 | (United Kingdom) Liam Griffin | 6–7 |
| (United Kingdom) Aston Martin Racing | Aston Martin Vantage GTE | Aston Martin AM05 4.5 L V8 | M | 98 | (Canada) Paul Dalla Lana | All |
| (United Kingdom) Aston Martin Racing | Aston Martin Vantage GTE | Aston Martin AM05 4.5 L V8 | M | 98 | (Portugal) Pedro Lamy | All |
| (United Kingdom) Aston Martin Racing | Aston Martin Vantage GTE | Aston Martin AM05 4.5 L V8 | M | 98 | (Austria) Mathias Lauda | All |

== Regulation changes ==
The FIA's World Motor Sport Council (WMSC) approved a series of regulation changes for the World Endurance Championship during December 2014. Tyres were limited at each race weekend, bar Le Mans, for the LMP1 and LMGTE categories: each car was allowed four sets of tyres in practice and six during the race. The LMP2 category retained their limit of three sets in practice and four during the race. Tyre manufacturers were also no longer allowed to refuse a supply program with a team. The qualifying format was also altered for the fourth season in a row. Teams were still required to run two drivers during the qualifying session, but only their best lap was used in determining the qualifying average; previously each driver's best two laps were averaged. LMP2 and LMGTE Am teams were also required to run at least one amateur driver during the qualifying session. A final regulation change was the elimination of the two LMP1 classes introduced in 2014. Regulations existed for hybrid and non-hybrid LMP1 cars, but all cars were classified under a single LMP1 category. The LMP1 Private Teams trophies were open to non-hybrid LMP1 cars only.

A second meeting of the WMSC in March 2015 approved further regulation changes. The LMP1 category had limits introduced to control the costs for manufacturers including a restriction on the number of personnel involved in operations, the homologation of only a single hybrid drivetrain design, and a maximum of five engines each car could use over the season, with the exception of new manufacturers allowed seven engines in their debut season. Limits were also placed on the number of days teams in all categories could conduct tests outside of races. An additional ballast weight could be added to cars whose drivers averaged less than 80 kg (180 lb). Further regulation changes proposed were an alteration to the minimum and maximum drive time allowances in the LMP1 and LMGTE Pro categories and a reduction in the duration of the qualifying session from 25 minutes to 20 due to each team only requiring a minimum of two laps instead of four.

== Results and standings ==
=== Race results ===
The highest finishing competitor entered in the World Endurance Championship is listed below. Invitational entries may have finished ahead of WEC competitors in individual races.

| Rnd. | Circuit | LMP1 Winners | LMP2 Winners | LMGTE Pro Winners | LMGTE Am Winners | Report |
|---|---|---|---|---|---|---|
| 1 | Silverstone | (Germany) No. 7 Audi Sport Team Joest | (Russia) No. 26 G-Drive Racing | (Italy) No. 51 AF Corse | (United Kingdom) No. 98 Aston Martin Racing | Results |
| 1 | Silverstone | (Germany) André Lotterer (Switzerland) Marcel Fässler (France) Benoît Tréluyer | (Russia) Roman Rusinov (France) Julien Canal (United Kingdom) Sam Bird | (Italy) Gianmaria Bruni (Finland) Toni Vilander | (Canada) Paul Dalla Lana (Portugal) Pedro Lamy (Austria) Mathias Lauda | Results |
| 2 | Spa-Francorchamps | (Germany) No. 7 Audi Sport Team Joest | (Russia) No. 28 G-Drive Racing (Note: The LMP2 class winner for Spa-Francorchamps was the No. 38 Jota Sport invitational entry. As it was not a full-season WEC entrant, the points for the win were awarded to the No. 28 G-Drive Racing entry.) | (United Kingdom) No. 99 Aston Martin Racing V8 | (United Kingdom) No. 98 Aston Martin Racing | Results |
| 2 | Spa-Francorchamps | (Germany) André Lotterer (Switzerland) Marcel Fässler (France) Benoît Tréluyer | (Colombia) Gustavo Yacamán (Mexico) Ricardo González (Brazil) Pipo Derani | (Brazil) Fernando Rees (United Kingdom) Alex MacDowall (New Zealand) Richie Stanaway | (Canada) Paul Dalla Lana (Portugal) Pedro Lamy (Austria) Mathias Lauda | Results |
| 3 | Le Mans | (Germany) No. 19 Porsche Team | (Hong Kong) No. 47 KCMG | (Italy) No. 71 AF Corse (Note: The LMGTE Pro class winner for Le Mans was the No. 64 Corvette Racing – GM invitational entry. As it was not a full-season WEC entrant, the points for the win were awarded to the No. 71 AF Corse entry.) | (Russia) No. 72 SMP Racing | Results |
| 3 | Le Mans | (Germany) Nico Hülkenberg (New Zealand) Earl Bamber (United Kingdom) Nick Tandy | (United Kingdom) Matthew Howson (United Kingdom) Richard Bradley (France) Nicholas Lapierre | (Italy) Davide Rigon (United Kingdom) James Calado (Monaco) Olivier Beretta | (Russia) Viktor Shaytar (Russia) Aleksey Basov (Italy) Andrea Bertolini | Results |
| 4 | Nürburgring | (Germany) No. 17 Porsche Team | (Hong Kong) No. 47 KCMG | (Germany) No. 91 Porsche Team Manthey | (Russia) No. 72 SMP Racing | Results |
| 4 | Nürburgring | (Germany) Timo Bernhard (Australia) Mark Webber (New Zealand) Brendon Hartley | (United Kingdom) Matthew Howson (United Kingdom) Richard Bradley (United Kingdom) Nick Tandy | (Austria) Richard Lietz (Denmark) Michael Christensen | (Russia) Viktor Shaytar (Russia) Aleksey Basov (Italy) Andrea Bertolini | Results |
| 5 | Austin | (Germany) No. 17 Porsche Team | (Russia) No. 26 G-Drive Racing | (Germany) No. 91 Porsche Team Manthey | (Russia) No. 72 SMP Racing | Results |
| 5 | Austin | (Germany) Timo Bernhard (Australia) Mark Webber (New Zealand) Brendon Hartley | (Russia) Roman Rusinov (France) Julien Canal (United Kingdom) Sam Bird | (Austria) Richard Lietz (Denmark) Michael Christensen | (Russia) Viktor Shaytar (Russia) Aleksey Basov (Italy) Andrea Bertolini | Results |
| 6 | Fuji | (Germany) No. 17 Porsche Team | (Russia) No. 26 G-Drive Racing | (Italy) No. 51 AF Corse | (Germany) No. 77 Dempsey Racing-Proton | Results |
| 6 | Fuji | (Germany) Timo Bernhard (Australia) Mark Webber (New Zealand) Brendon Hartley | (Russia) Roman Rusinov (France) Julien Canal (United Kingdom) Sam Bird | (Italy) Gianmaria Bruni (Finland) Toni Vilander | (United States) Patrick Dempsey (United States) Patrick Long (Germany) Marco Seefried | Results |
| 7 | Shanghai | (Germany) No. 17 Porsche Team | (France) No. 36 Signatech Alpine | (Germany) No. 91 Porsche Team Manthey | (Italy) No. 83 AF Corse | Results |
| 7 | Shanghai | (Germany) Timo Bernhard (Australia) Mark Webber (New Zealand) Brendon Hartley | (France) Nelson Panciatici (France) Paul-Loup Chatin (France) Tom Dillmann | (Austria) Richard Lietz (Denmark) Michael Christensen | (France) François Perrodo (France) Emmanuel Collard (Portugal) Rui Águas | Results |
| 8 | Bahrain | (Germany) No. 18 Porsche Team | (Russia) No. 26 G-Drive Racing | (Germany) No. 92 Porsche Team Manthey | (United Kingdom) No. 98 Aston Martin Racing | Results |
| 8 | Bahrain | (Germany) Marc Lieb (France) Romain Dumas (Switzerland) Neel Jani | (Russia) Roman Rusinov (France) Julien Canal (United Kingdom) Sam Bird | (France) Frédéric Makowiecki (France) Patrick Pilet | (Canada) Paul Dalla Lana (Portugal) Pedro Lamy (Austria) Mathias Lauda | Results |

Notes:

Entries were required to complete the timed race as well as to complete 70% of the overall winning car's race distance in order to earn championship points. A single bonus point was awarded to the team and all drivers of the pole position car for each category in qualifying. For the 24 Hours of Le Mans, the race result points allocation was doubled. Furthermore, a race must have completed three laps under green flag conditions in order for championship points to be awarded.

=== Drivers' Championships ===
Five titles were offered to drivers in the 2015 season. The World Championship was reserved for LMP1 and LMP2 drivers while the World Cup for GT Drivers was available for drivers in the LMGTE categories. Further, three FIA Endurance Trophies were also awarded to drivers in the LMP2 and LMGTE Am categories as well as privateers in the LMP1 category.

Points systems
| Duration | 1st | 2nd | 3rd | 4th | 5th | 6th | 7th | 8th | 9th | 10th | Other | Pole |
|---|---|---|---|---|---|---|---|---|---|---|---|---|
| 6 Hours | 25 | 18 | 15 | 12 | 10 | 8 | 6 | 4 | 2 | 1 | 0.5 | 1 |
| 24 Hours | 50 | 36 | 30 | 24 | 20 | 16 | 12 | 8 | 4 | 2 | 1 | 1 |

==== World Endurance Drivers' Championship ====
| Pos. | Driver | Team | SIL (United Kingdom) | SPA (Belgium) | LMS (France) | NÜR (Germany) | COA (United States) | FUJ (Japan) | SHA (China) | BHR (Bahrain) | Total points |
|---|---|---|---|---|---|---|---|---|---|---|---|
| 1 | (Germany) Timo Bernhard | (Germany) Porsche Team | **Ret** | **3** | 2 | 1 | 1 | **1** | **1** | **5** | 166 |
| 1 | (Australia) Mark Webber | (Germany) Porsche Team | **Ret** | **3** | 2 | 1 | 1 | **1** | **1** | **5** | 166 |
| 1 | (New Zealand) Brendon Hartley | (Germany) Porsche Team | **Ret** | **3** | 2 | 1 | 1 | **1** | **1** | **5** | 166 |
| 2 | (Germany) André Lotterer | (Germany) Audi Sport Team Joest | 1 | 1 | 3 | 3 | 2 | 3 | 3 | 2 | 161 |
| 2 | (Switzerland) Marcel Fässler | (Germany) Audi Sport Team Joest | 1 | 1 | 3 | 3 | 2 | 3 | 3 | 2 | 161 |
| 2 | (France) Benoît Tréluyer | (Germany) Audi Sport Team Joest | 1 | 1 | 3 | 3 | 2 | 3 | 3 | 2 | 161 |
| 3 | (Germany) Marc Lieb | (Germany) Porsche Team | 2 | 2 | **5** | **2** | **12** | 2 | 2 | 1 | 138.5 |
| 3 | (France) Romain Dumas | (Germany) Porsche Team | 2 | 2 | **5** | **2** | **12** | 2 | 2 | 1 | 138.5 |
| 3 | (Switzerland) Neel Jani | (Germany) Porsche Team | 2 | 2 | **5** | **2** | **12** | 2 | 2 | 1 | 138.5 |
| 4 | (France) Loïc Duval | (Germany) Audi Sport Team Joest | 5 | 7 | 4 | 4 | 3 | 4 | 4 | 6 | 99 |
| 4 | (Brazil) Lucas di Grassi | (Germany) Audi Sport Team Joest | 5 | 7 | 4 | 4 | 3 | 4 | 4 | 6 | 99 |
| 4 | (United Kingdom) Oliver Jarvis | (Germany) Audi Sport Team Joest | 5 | 7 | 4 | 4 | 3 | 4 | 4 | 6 | 99 |
| 5 | (United Kingdom) Anthony Davidson | (Japan) Toyota Racing | 3 | 8 | 8 | 5 | 4 | 5 | 6 | 4 | 79 |
| 5 | (Switzerland) Sébastien Buemi | (Japan) Toyota Racing | 3 | 8 | 8 | 5 | 4 | 5 | 6 | 4 | 79 |
| 6 | (Austria) Alexander Wurz | (Japan) Toyota Racing | 4 | 5 | 6 | 6 | Ret | 6 | 5 | 3 | 79 |
| 6 | (United Kingdom) Mike Conway | (Japan) Toyota Racing | 4 | 5 | 6 | 6 | Ret | 6 | 5 | 3 | 79 |
| 6 | (France) Stéphane Sarrazin | (Japan) Toyota Racing | 4 | 5 | 6 | 6 | Ret | 6 | 5 | 3 | 79 |
| 7 | (Japan) Kazuki Nakajima | (Japan) Toyota Racing | 3 | WD | 8 | 5 | 4 | 5 | 6 | 4 | 75 |
| 8 | (United Kingdom) Nick Tandy | (Hong Kong) KCMG | 9 | | | 7 | | Ret | 11 | 8 | 70.5 |
| 8 | (United Kingdom) Nick Tandy | (Germany) Porsche Team | | 6 | 1 | | | | | | 70.5 |
| 9 | (New Zealand) Earl Bamber | (Germany) Porsche Team | | 6 | 1 | | | | | | 58 |
| 9 | (Germany) Nico Hülkenberg | (Germany) Porsche Team | | 6 | 1 | | | | | | 58 |
| 10 | (Russia) Roman Rusinov | (Russia) G-Drive Racing | 6 | 17 | 10 | 8 | 5 | 9 | 10 | 7 | 33.5 |
| 10 | (France) Julien Canal | (Russia) G-Drive Racing | 6 | 17 | 10 | 8 | 5 | 9 | 10 | 7 | 33.5 |
| 10 | (United Kingdom) Sam Bird | (Russia) G-Drive Racing | 6 | 17 | 10 | 8 | 5 | 9 | 10 | 7 | 33.5 |
| 11 | (United Kingdom) Matthew Howson | (Hong Kong) KCMG | 9 | 11 | 9 | 7 | 6 | Ret | 11 | 8 | 25 |
| 11 | (United Kingdom) Richard Bradley | (Hong Kong) KCMG | 9 | 11 | 9 | 7 | 6 | Ret | 11 | 8 | 25 |
| 12 | (Portugal) Filipe Albuquerque | (Germany) Audi Sport Team Joest | | 4 | 7 | | | | | | 24 |
| 12 | (Italy) Marco Bonanomi | (Germany) Audi Sport Team Joest | | 4 | 7 | | | | | | 24 |
| 12 | (Germany) René Rast | (Germany) Audi Sport Team Joest | | 4 | 7 | | | | | | 24 |
| 13 | (Colombia) Gustavo Yacamán | (Russia) G-Drive Racing | 7 | 9 | 11 | 9 | 7 | 11 | Ret | 9 | 19.5 |
| 13 | (Mexico) Ricardo González | (Russia) G-Drive Racing | 7 | 9 | 11 | 9 | 7 | 11 | Ret | 9 | 19.5 |
| 13 | (Brazil) Pipo Derani | (Russia) G-Drive Racing | 7 | 9 | 11 | 9 | 7 | 11 | Ret | 9 | 19.5 |
| 14 | (Switzerland) Mathias Beche | (Switzerland) Rebellion Racing | | | 14 | 16 | 15 | 7 | 7 | 13 | 14.5 |
| 14 | (France) Nico Prost | (Switzerland) Rebellion Racing | | | 14 | 16 | 15 | 7 | 7 | 13 | 14.5 |
| 15 | (Germany) Pierre Kaffer | (Austria) Team ByKolles | Ret | Ret | EX | 15 | 8 | 8 | 8 | 12 | 13 |
| 15 | (Switzerland) Simon Trummer | (Austria) Team ByKolles | Ret | Ret | EX | 15 | 8 | 8 | 8 | 12 | 13 |
| 16 | (France) Nicolas Lapierre | (Hong Kong) KCMG | | 11 | 9 | | 6 | | | | 12.5 |
| 17 | (United Kingdom) Nick Leventis | (United Kingdom) Strakka Racing | 8 | 13 | Ret | 13 | 13 | 14 | 14 | 14 | 7 |
| 17 | (United Kingdom) Jonny Kane | (United Kingdom) Strakka Racing | 8 | 13 | Ret | 13 | 13 | 14 | 15 | 14 | 7 |
| 17 | (United Kingdom) Danny Watts | (United Kingdom) Strakka Racing | 8 | 13 | Ret | 13 | 13 | 14 | 15 | 14 | 7 |
| 18 | (France) Nelson Panciatici | (France) Signatech Alpine | Ret | 12 | Ret | 11 | 11 | 10 | 9 | 10 | 5.5 |
| 18 | (France) Paul-Loup Chatin | (France) Signatech Alpine | Ret | 12 | Ret | 11 | 11 | 10 | 9 | 10 | 5.5 |
| 19 | (United States) Scott Sharp | (United States) Extreme Speed Motorsports | EX | 16 | 15 | 12 | 9 | 12 | Ret | 16 | 5 |
| 19 | (United Kingdom) Ryan Dalziel | (United States) Extreme Speed Motorsports | EX | 16 | 15 | 12 | 9 | 12 | Ret | 16 | 5 |
| 19 | (Denmark) David Heinemeier Hansson | (United States) Extreme Speed Motorsports | EX | 16 | 15 | 12 | 9 | 12 | Ret | 16 | 5 |
| 20 | (United Kingdom) Oliver Webb | (Switzerland) Team SARD Morand | | 10 | Ret | 10 | 10 | 13 | 12 | 15 | 4.5 |
| 20 | (France) Pierre Ragues | (Switzerland) Team SARD Morand | | 10 | Ret | 10 | 10 | 13 | 12 | 15 | 4.5 |
| 21 | (United States) Ed Brown | (United States) Extreme Speed Motorsports | 11 | 15 | 12 | 14 | Ret | 15 | 13 | 17 | 4 |
| 21 | (United States) Jon Fogarty | (United States) Extreme Speed Motorsports | 11 | 15 | 12 | 14 | Ret | 15 | 13 | 17 | 4 |
| 22 | (United States) Johannes van Overbeek | (United States) Extreme Speed Motorsports | | 15 | 12 | 14 | Ret | 15 | 13 | 17 | 3.5 |
| 23 | (France) Tom Dillmann | (France) Signatech Alpine | | | | | | | 9 | 10 | 3 |
| 24 | (France) Jacques Nicolet | (France) OAK Racing | 10 | 14 | 16 | | | | | | 2.5 |
| 24 | (France) Jean-Marc Merlin | (France) OAK Racing | 10 | 14 | 16 | | | | | | 2.5 |
| 24 | (France) Erik Maris | (France) OAK Racing | 10 | 14 | 16 | | | | | | 2.5 |
| 25 | (Austria) Dominik Kraihamer | (Switzerland) Rebellion Racing | | | 13 | Ret | 14 | 16 | Ret | 11 | 2.5 |
| 25 | (Switzerland) Alexandre Imperatori | (Switzerland) Rebellion Racing | | | 13 | Ret | 14 | 16 | Ret | 11 | 2.5 |
| 26 | (France) Vincent Capillaire | (France) Signatech Alpine | Ret | 12 | Ret | 11 | 11 | 10 | | | 2.5 |
| Pos. | Driver | Team | SIL (United Kingdom) | SPA (Belgium) | LMS (France) | NÜR (Germany) | COA (United States) | FUJ (Japan) | SHA (China) | BHR (Bahrain) | Total points |

| Colour | Result |
|---|---|
| Gold | Winner |
| Silver | Second place |
| Bronze | Third place |
| Green | Points classification |
| Blue | Non-points classification |
| Blue | Non-classified finish (NC) |
| Purple | Retired, not classified (Ret) |
| Red | Did not qualify (DNQ) |
| Red | Did not pre-qualify (DNPQ) |
| Black | Disqualified (DSQ) |
| White | Did not start (DNS) |
| White | Withdrew (WD) |
| White | Race cancelled (C) |
| Blank | Did not practice (DNP) |
| Blank | Did not arrive (DNA) |
| Blank | Excluded (EX) |

**Bold** - Pole position

==== World Endurance Cup for GT Drivers ====
| Pos. | Driver | Team | SIL (United Kingdom) | SPA (Belgium) | LMS (France) | NÜR (Germany) | COA (United States) | FUJ (Japan) | SHA (China) | BHR (Bahrain) | Total points |
|---|---|---|---|---|---|---|---|---|---|---|---|
| 1 | (Austria) Richard Lietz | (Germany) Porsche Team Manthey | 2 | 2 | 7 | 1 | 1 | 4 | 1 | 5 | 145 |
| 2 | (Italy) Gianmaria Bruni | (Italy) AF Corse | 1 | 4 | 4 | **14** | 7 | 1 | **2** | **2** | 131.5 |
| 2 | (Finland) Toni Vilander | (Italy) AF Corse | 1 | 4 | 4 | **14** | 7 | 1 | **2** | **2** | 131.5 |
| 3 | (Denmark) Michael Christensen | (Germany) Porsche Team Manthey | 2 | | 7 | 1 | 1 | 4 | 1 | 5 | 127 |
| 4 | (Italy) Davide Rigon | (Italy) AF Corse | 3 | 7 | 2 | 3 | 3 | **3** | 4 | 6 | 123 |
| 4 | (United Kingdom) James Calado | (Italy) AF Corse | 3 | 7 | 2 | 3 | 3 | **3** | 4 | 6 | 123 |
| 5 | (France) Frédéric Makowiecki | (Germany) Porsche Team Manthey | 7 | 2 | Ret | 2 | 2 | 2 | 3 | 1 | 118 |
| 6 | (France) Patrick Pilet | (Germany) Porsche Team Manthey | 7 | | Ret | 2 | 2 | 2 | 3 | 1 | 100 |
| 7 | (Brazil) Fernando Rees | (United Kingdom) Aston Martin Racing V8 | 6 | **1** | **9** | 5 | **4** | 7 | 5 | 7 | 84 |
| 7 | (United Kingdom) Alex MacDowall | (United Kingdom) Aston Martin Racing V8 | 6 | **1** | **9** | 5 | **4** | 7 | 5 | 7 | 84 |
| 8 | (Denmark) Christoffer Nygaard | (United Kingdom) Aston Martin Racing | **4** | 6 | 6 | 4 | 5 | 5 | | 4 | 81 |
| 8 | (Denmark) Marco Sørensen | (United Kingdom) Aston Martin Racing | **4** | 6 | 6 | 4 | 5 | 5 | | 4 | 81 |
| 9 | (New Zealand) Richie Stanaway | (United Kingdom) Aston Martin Racing V8 | 6 | **1** | **9** | 5 | **4** | | 5 | 7 | 78 |
| 10 | (United Kingdom) Darren Turner | (United Kingdom) Aston Martin Racing | 5 | 5 | Ret | 6 | 6 | 6 | 6 | 3 | 67 |
| 11 | (Russia) Aleksey Basov | (Russia) SMP Racing | 10 | 10 | 1 | 7 | 8 | 13 | 9 | 12 | 65 |
| 11 | (Russia) Viktor Shaytar | (Russia) SMP Racing | 10 | 10 | 1 | 7 | 8 | 13 | 9 | 12 | 65 |
| 11 | (Italy) Andrea Bertolini | (Russia) SMP Racing | 10 | 10 | 1 | 7 | 8 | 13 | 9 | 12 | 65 |
| 12 | (United Kingdom) Jonathan Adam | (United Kingdom) Aston Martin Racing | | | | 6 | 6 | 6 | 6 | 3 | 47 |
| 13 | (Denmark) Nicki Thiim | (United Kingdom) Aston Martin Racing | **4** | | 6 | | | | | 4 | 41 |
| 14 | (Germany) Marco Seefried | (Germany) Dempsey Racing-Proton | 13 | 12 | 3 | 10 | 11 | 8 | 10 | 10 | 38.5 |
| 14 | (United States) Patrick Long | (Germany) Dempsey Racing-Proton | 13 | 12 | 3 | 10 | 11 | 8 | 10 | 10 | 38.5 |
| 15 | (United States) Patrick Dempsey | (Germany) Dempsey Racing-Proton | 13 | 12 | 3 | 10 | 11 | 8 | 10 | | 37.5 |
| 16 | (Monaco) Olivier Beretta | (Italy) AF Corse | | | 2 | | | | | | 36 |
| 17 | (France) François Perrodo | (Italy) AF Corse | 9 | 9 | 5 | 9 | 10 | 10 | 7 | 11 | 34.5 |
| 17 | (France) Emmanuel Collard | (Italy) AF Corse | 9 | 9 | 5 | 9 | 10 | 10 | 7 | 11 | 34.5 |
| 18 | (Germany) Stefan Mücke | (United Kingdom) Aston Martin Racing | 5 | 5 | Ret | 6 | | 7 | | | 34 |
| 19 | (Portugal) Rui Águas | (Italy) AF Corse | 9 | 9 | 5 | 9 | 10 | 10 | 7 | | 34 |
| 20 | (Italy) Giancarlo Fisichella | (Italy) AF Corse | | | 4 | | | | | | 24 |
| 21 | (Canada) Paul Dalla Lana | (United Kingdom) Aston Martin Racing | 8 | 8 | NC | 8 | 12 | 9 | 8 | 8 | 22.5 |
| 21 | (Portugal) Pedro Lamy | (United Kingdom) Aston Martin Racing | 8 | 8 | NC | 8 | 12 | 9 | 8 | 8 | 22.5 |
| 21 | (Austria) Mathias Lauda | (United Kingdom) Aston Martin Racing | 8 | 8 | NC | 8 | 12 | 9 | 8 | 8 | 22.5 |
| 22 | (Germany) Sven Müller | (Germany) Porsche Team Manthey | | 3 | | | | | | | 15 |
| 22 | (France) Kévin Estre | (Germany) Porsche Team Manthey | | 3 | | | | | | | 15 |
| 23 | (Germany) Jörg Bergmeister | (Germany) Porsche Team Manthey | | | 7 | | | | | | 12 |
| 24 | (United Kingdom) Robert Bell | (United Kingdom) Aston Martin Racing | | 5 | Ret | | | | | | 10 |
| 25 | (Italy) Matteo Cressoni | (Italy) AF Corse | | | 8 | | | | | 11 | 8.5 |
| 26 | (United States) Peter Ashley Mann | (Italy) AF Corse | | | 8 | | | | | | 8 |
| 26 | (Italy) Raffaele Giammaria | (Italy) AF Corse | | | 8 | | | | | | 8 |
| 27 | (United Arab Emirates) Khaled Al Qubaisi | (Germany) Abu Dhabi-Proton Racing | 12 | 11 | Ret | 12 | 9 | 12 | 12 | 9 | 6.5 |
| 28 | (Germany) Christian Ried | (Germany) Abu Dhabi-Proton Racing | 12 | 11 | Ret | 12 | 9 | 12 | 12 | 10 | 5.5 |
| 29 | (Austria) Klaus Bachler | (Germany) Abu Dhabi-Proton Racing | 12 | 11 | Ret | | | | 12 | 9 | 3.5 |
| 30 | (United Kingdom) Stuart Hall | (United Kingdom) Aston Martin Racing | 11 | 13 | Ret | 13 | 13 | 14 | 12 | 14 | 3.5 |
| 30 | (Italy) Francesco Castellacci | (United Kingdom) Aston Martin Racing | 11 | 13 | Ret | 13 | 13 | 14 | 12 | 14 | 3.5 |
| 31 | (New Zealand) Earl Bamber | (Germany) Abu Dhabi-Proton Racing | | | | 12 | 9 | 12 | | | 3 |
| 32 | (Italy) Gianluca Roda | (France) Larbre Compétition | 14 | Ret | Ret | 11 | 14 | 11 | 11 | 13 | 3 |
| 32 | (Italy) Paolo Ruberti | (France) Larbre Compétition | 14 | Ret | Ret | 11 | 14 | 11 | 11 | 13 | 3 |
| 33 | (Italy) Marco Mapelli | (Germany) Abu Dhabi-Proton Racing | | | | | | | | 9 | 2 |
| 34 | (Germany) Roald Goethe | (United Kingdom) Aston Martin Racing | 11 | 13 | Ret | 13 | | | | 14 | 2 |
| 35 | (Denmark) Kristian Poulsen | (France) Larbre Compétition | 14 | Ret | Ret | 11 | 14 | | | 13 | 2 |
| Pos. | Driver | Team | SIL (United Kingdom) | SPA (Belgium) | LMS (France) | NÜR (Germany) | COA (United States) | FUJ (Japan) | SHA (China) | BHR (Bahrain) | Total points |

==== LMP1 Private Teams Drivers' Trophy ====
| Pos. | Driver | Team | SIL (United Kingdom) | SPA (Belgium) | LMS (France) | NÜR (Germany) | COA (United States) | FUJ (Japan) | SHA (China) | BHR (Bahrain) | Total points |
|---|---|---|---|---|---|---|---|---|---|---|---|
| 1 | (France) Nicolas Prost | (Switzerland) Rebellion Racing | | | 2 | 2 | 3 | 1 | 1 | 3 | 134 |
| 1 | (Switzerland) Mathias Beche | (Switzerland) Rebellion Racing | | | 2 | 2 | 3 | 1 | 1 | 3 | 134 |
| 2 | (Switzerland) Alexandre Imperatori | (Switzerland) Rebellion Racing | | | 1 | Ret | 2 | 3 | Ret | 1 | 108 |
| 2 | (Austria) Dominik Kraihamer | (Switzerland) Rebellion Racing | | | 1 | Ret | 2 | 3 | Ret | 1 | 108 |
| 3 | (Switzerland) Simon Trummer | (Austria) Team ByKolles | Ret | Ret | EX | 1 | 1 | 2 | 2 | 2 | 104 |
| 3 | (Germany) Pierre Kaffer | (Austria) Team ByKolles | | | EX | 1 | 1 | 2 | 2 | 2 | 104 |
| 4 | (Germany) Daniel Abt | (Switzerland) Rebellion Racing | | | 1 | Ret | 2 | 3 | | | 83 |
| 5 | (Germany) Nick Heidfeld | (Switzerland) Rebellion Racing | | | 2 | 2 | 3 | | | | 69 |
| 6 | (Switzerland) Mathéo Tuscher | (Switzerland) Rebellion Racing | | | | | | | Ret | 1 | 25 |

==== FIA Endurance Trophy for LMP2 Drivers ====
| Pos. | Driver | Team | SIL (United Kingdom) | SPA (Belgium) | LMS (France) | NÜR (Germany) | COA (United States) | FUJ (Japan) | SHA (China) | BHR (Bahrain) | Total points |
|---|---|---|---|---|---|---|---|---|---|---|---|
| 1 | (Russia) Roman Rusinov | (Russia) G-Drive Racing | 1 | **9** | 2 | 2 | **1** | **1** | **2** | 1 | 178 |
| 1 | (France) Julien Canal | (Russia) G-Drive Racing | 1 | **9** | 2 | 2 | **1** | **1** | **2** | 1 | 178 |
| 1 | (United Kingdom) Sam Bird | (Russia) G-Drive Racing | 1 | **9** | 2 | 2 | **1** | **1** | **2** | 1 | 178 |
| 2 | (United Kingdom) Matthew Howson | (Hong Kong) KCMG | 4 | 3 | **1** | **1** | 2 | Ret | 3 | 2 | 155 |
| 2 | (United Kingdom) Richard Bradley | (Hong Kong) KCMG | 4 | 3 | **1** | **1** | 2 | Ret | 3 | 2 | 155 |
| 3 | (Colombia) Gustavo Yacamán | (Russia) G-Drive Racing | **2** | 1 | 3 | 3 | 3 | 3 | Ret | 3 | 134 |
| 3 | (Mexico) Ricardo González | (Russia) G-Drive Racing | **2** | 1 | 3 | 3 | 3 | 3 | Ret | 3 | 134 |
| 3 | (Brazil) Pipo Derani | (Russia) G-Drive Racing | **2** | 1 | 3 | 3 | 3 | 3 | Ret | 3 | 134 |
| 4 | (France) Nelson Panciatici | (France) Signatech Alpine | Ret | 4 | Ret | 5 | 6 | 2 | 1 | **4** | 86 |
| 4 | (France) Paul-Loup Chatin | (France) Signatech Alpine | Ret | 4 | Ret | 5 | 6 | 2 | 1 | **4** | 86 |
| 5 | (France) Nicolas Lapierre | (Hong Kong) KCMG | | 3 | **1** | | 2 | | | | 84 |
| 6 | (United Kingdom) Nick Tandy | (Hong Kong) KCMG | 4 | | | **1** | | Ret | 3 | 2 | 71 |
| 7 | (United Kingdom) Oliver Webb | (Switzerland) Team SARD Morand | | 2 | Ret | 4 | 5 | 5 | 4 | 6 | 70 |
| 7 | (France) Pierre Ragues | (Switzerland) Team SARD Morand | | 2 | Ret | 4 | 5 | 5 | 4 | 6 | 70 |
| 8 | (United Kingdom) Nick Leventis | (United Kingdom) Strakka Racing | 3 | 5 | Ret | 7 | 7 | 6 | 6 | 5 | 63 |
| 8 | (United Kingdom) Jonny Kane | (United Kingdom) Strakka Racing | 3 | 5 | Ret | 7 | 7 | 6 | 6 | 5 | 63 |
| 8 | (United Kingdom) Danny Watts | (United Kingdom) Strakka Racing | 3 | 5 | Ret | 7 | 7 | 6 | 6 | 5 | 63 |
| 9 | (United States) Scott Sharp | (United States) Extreme Speed Motorsports | EX | 8 | 5 | 6 | 4 | 4 | Ret | 7 | 62 |
| 9 | (United Kingdom) Ryan Dalziel | (United States) Extreme Speed Motorsports | EX | 8 | 5 | 6 | 4 | 4 | Ret | 7 | 62 |
| 9 | (Denmark) David Heinemeier Hansson | (United States) Extreme Speed Motorsports | EX | 8 | 5 | 6 | 4 | 4 | Ret | 7 | 62 |
| 10 | (United States) Ed Brown | (United States) Extreme Speed Motorsports | 6 | 7 | 4 | 8 | Ret | 7 | 5 | 8 | 62 |
| 10 | (United States) Jon Fogarty | (United States) Extreme Speed Motorsports | 6 | 7 | 4 | 8 | Ret | 7 | 5 | 8 | 62 |
| 11 | (United States) Johannes van Overbeek | (United States) Extreme Speed Motorsports | | 7 | 4 | 8 | Ret | 7 | 5 | 8 | 54 |
| 12 | (France) Vincent Capillaire | (France) Signatech Alpine | Ret | 4 | Ret | 5 | 6 | 2 | | | 48 |

==== FIA Endurance Trophy for LMGTE Am Drivers ====
| Pos. | Driver | Team | SIL (United Kingdom) | SPA (Belgium) | LMS (France) | NÜR (Germany) | COA (United States) | FUJ (Japan) | SHA (China) | BHR (Bahrain) | Total points |
|---|---|---|---|---|---|---|---|---|---|---|---|
| 1 | (Russia) Viktor Shaytar | (Russia) SMP Racing | 3 | 3 | 1 | **1** | 1 | **6** | 3 | 5 | 165 |
| 1 | (Russia) Aleksey Basov | (Russia) SMP Racing | 3 | 3 | 1 | **1** | 1 | **6** | 3 | 5 | 165 |
| 1 | (Italy) Andrea Bertolini | (Russia) SMP Racing | 3 | 3 | 1 | **1** | 1 | **6** | 3 | 5 | 165 |
| 2 | (France) François Perrodo | (Italy) AF Corse | 2 | 2 | 3 | 3 | 3 | 3 | 1 | 4 | 148 |
| 2 | (France) Emmanuel Collard | (Italy) AF Corse | 2 | 2 | 3 | 3 | 3 | 3 | 1 | 4 | 148 |
| 3 | (Canada) Paul Dalla Lana | (United Kingdom) Aston Martin Racing | **1** | **1** | **NC** | 2 | 5 | 2 | **2** | **1** | 144 |
| 3 | (Portugal) Pedro Lamy | (United Kingdom) Aston Martin Racing | **1** | **1** | **NC** | 2 | 5 | 2 | **2** | **1** | 144 |
| 3 | (Austria) Mathias Lauda | (United Kingdom) Aston Martin Racing | **1** | **1** | **NC** | 2 | 5 | 2 | **2** | **1** | 144 |
| 4 | (Portugal) Rui Águas | (Italy) AF Corse | 2 | 2 | 3 | 3 | 3 | 3 | 1 | | 136 |
| 5 | (United States) Patrick Long | (Germany) Dempsey Racing-Proton | 6 | 5 | 2 | 4 | **4** | 1 | 4 | 3 | 131 |
| 5 | (Germany) Marco Seefried | (Germany) Dempsey Racing-Proton | 6 | 5 | 2 | 4 | **4** | 1 | 4 | 3 | 131 |
| 6 | (United States) Patrick Dempsey | (Germany) Dempsey Racing-Proton | 6 | 5 | 2 | 4 | **4** | 1 | 4 | | 116 |
| 7 | (United Arab Emirates) Khaled Al Qubaisi | (Germany) Abu Dhabi-Proton Racing | 5 | 4 | Ret | 6 | 2 | 5 | 7 | 2 | 82 |
| 8 | (Germany) Christian Ried | (Germany) Abu Dhabi-Proton Racing | 5 | 4 | Ret | 6 | 2 | 5 | 7 | | 79 |
| 8 | (Germany) Christian Ried | (Germany) Dempsey Racing-Proton | | | | | | | | 3 | 79 |
| 9 | (United Kingdom) Stuart Hall | (United Kingdom) Aston Martin Racing | 4 | 6 | Ret | 7 | 6 | 7 | 6 | 7 | 54 |
| 9 | (Italy) Francesco Castellacci | (United Kingdom) Aston Martin Racing | 4 | 6 | Ret | 7 | 6 | 7 | 6 | 7 | 54 |
| 10 | (Italy) Gianluca Roda | (France) Larbre Compétition | 7 | Ret | Ret | 5 | 6 | 4 | 5 | 6 | 52 |
| 10 | (Italy) Paolo Ruberti | (France) Larbre Compétition | 7 | Ret | Ret | 5 | 6 | 4 | 5 | 6 | 52 |
| 11 | (Austria) Klaus Bachler | (Germany) Abu Dhabi-Proton Racing | 5 | 4 | Ret | | | | 7 | 2 | 46 |
| 12 | (Italy) Matteo Cressoni | (Italy) AF Corse | | | 4 | | | | | 4 | 36 |
| 13 | (New Zealand) Earl Bamber | (Germany) Abu Dhabi-Proton Racing | | | | 6 | 2 | 5 | | | 36 |
| 14 | (Germany) Roald Goethe | (United Kingdom) Aston Martin Racing | 4 | 6 | Ret | 7 | | | | 7 | 32 |
| 15 | (Denmark) Kristian Poulsen | (France) Larbre Compétition | 7 | Ret | Ret | 5 | 7 | | | 6 | 30 |

=== Manufacturers' Championships ===
Two manufacturers' titles were contested in the 2015 FIA WEC, one for LMPs and one for LMGTEs. The World Endurance Championship for Manufacturers was only open to manufacturer entries in the LMP1 category, while the World Endurance Cup for GT Manufacturers allowed all entries from registered manufacturers in LMGTE Pro and LMGTE Am to participate. The two top finishing cars from each manufacturer earned points toward their total.

==== World Endurance Manufacturers' Championship ====
| Pos. | Manufacturer | SIL (United Kingdom) | SPA (Belgium) | LMS (France) | NÜR (Germany) | COA (United States) | FUJ (Japan) | SHA (China) | BHR (Bahrain) | Total points |
|---|---|---|---|---|---|---|---|---|---|---|
| 1 | (Germany) Porsche | 2 | 2 | 1 | 1 | 1 | **1** | **1** | 1 | 344 |
| 1 | (Germany) Porsche | **Ret** | **3** | **2** | **2** | **5** | 2 | 2 | **5** | 344 |
| 2 | (Germany) Audi | 1 | 1 | 3 | 3 | 2 | 3 | 3 | 2 | 264 |
| 2 | (Germany) Audi | 5 | 5 | 4 | 4 | 3 | 4 | 4 | 6 | 264 |
| 3 | (Japan) Toyota | 3 | 4 | 6 | 5 | 4 | 5 | 5 | 3 | 164 |
| 3 | (Japan) Toyota | 4 | 6 | 8 | 6 | Ret | 6 | 6 | 4 | 164 |
| 4 | (Japan) Nissan | | | NC | | | | | | 0 |
| 4 | (Japan) Nissan | | | Ret | | | | | | 0 |

==== World Endurance Cup for GT Manufacturers ====
| Pos. | Manufacturer | SIL (United Kingdom) | SPA (Belgium) | LMS (France) | NÜR (Germany) | COA (United States) | FUJ (Japan) | SHA (China) | BHR (Bahrain) | Total points |
|---|---|---|---|---|---|---|---|---|---|---|
| 1 | (Germany) Porsche | 2 | 2 | 3 | 1 | 1 | 2 | 1 | 1 | 290 |
| 1 | (Germany) Porsche | 7 | 3 | 7 | 2 | 2 | 4 | 3 | 5 | 290 |
| 2 | (Italy) Ferrari | 1 | 4 | 1 | **3** | 3 | 1 | **2** | **2** | 286 |
| 2 | (Italy) Ferrari | 3 | 7 | 2 | 7 | 7 | **3** | 4 | 6 | 286 |
| 3 | (United Kingdom) Aston Martin | **4** | **1** | 6 | 4 | **4** | 5 | 5 | 3 | 192 |
| 3 | (United Kingdom) Aston Martin | 5 | 5 | **8** | 5 | 5 | 6 | 6 | 4 | 192 |

=== Teams' Championships ===
All categories awarded a team trophy for each individual entry, although LMP1 was limited to entries not from a manufacturer.

==== FIA Endurance Trophy for Private LMP1 Teams ====
| Pos. | Car | Team | SIL (United Kingdom) | SPA (Belgium) | LMS (France) | NÜR (Germany) | COA (United States) | FUJ (Japan) | SHA (China) | BHR (Bahrain) | Total points |
|---|---|---|---|---|---|---|---|---|---|---|---|
| 1 | 12 | (Switzerland) Rebellion Racing | | | 2 | 2 | 3 | 1 | 1 | 3 | 134 |
| 2 | 13 | (Switzerland) Rebellion Racing | | | 1 | Ret | 2 | 3 | Ret | 1 | 108 |
| 3 | 4 | (Austria) Team ByKolles | Ret | Ret | EX | 1 | 1 | 2 | 2 | 2 | 104 |

==== FIA Endurance Trophy for LMP2 Teams ====
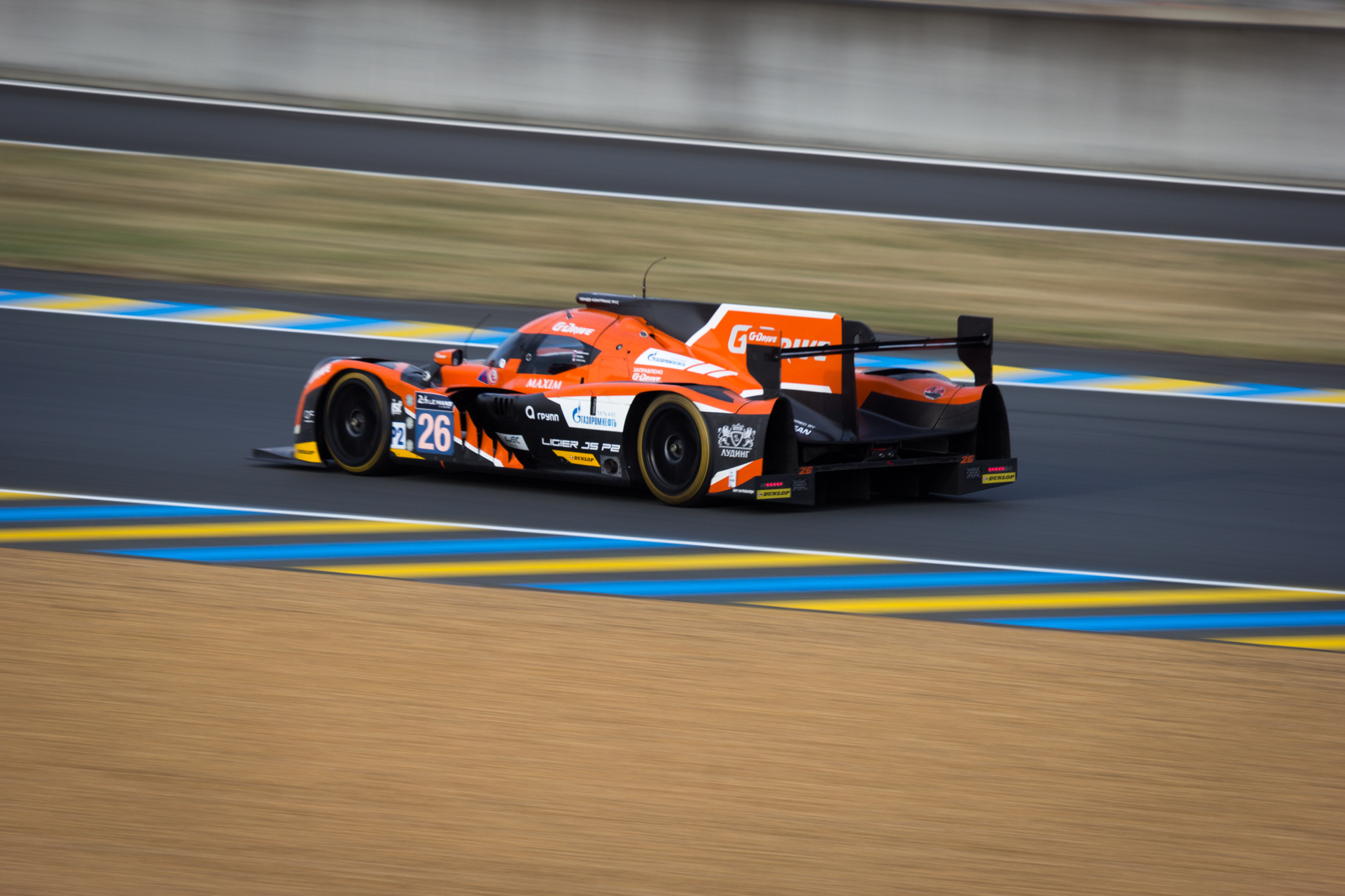
G-Drive Racing won the Endurance Trophy for LMP2 Teams with its No 26 Ligier JS P2 - Nissan

| Pos. | Car | Team | SIL (United Kingdom) | SPA (Belgium) | LMS (France) | NÜR (Germany) | COA (United States) | FUJ (Japan) | SHA (China) | BHR (Bahrain) | Total points |
|---|---|---|---|---|---|---|---|---|---|---|---|
| 1 | 26 | (Russia) G-Drive Racing | 1 | **9** | 2 | 2 | **1** | **1** | **2** | 1 | 178 |
| 2 | 47 | (Hong Kong) KCMG | 4 | 3 | **1** | **1** | 2 | Ret | 3 | 2 | 155 |
| 3 | 28 | (Russia) G-Drive Racing | **2** | 1 | 3 | 3 | 3 | 3 | Ret | 3 | 134 |
| 4 | 36 | (France) Signatech Alpine | Ret | 4 | Ret | 5 | 6 | 2 | 1 | **4** | 86 |
| 5 | 43 | (Switzerland) Team SARD Morand | | 2 | Ret | 4 | 5 | 5 | 4 | 6 | 70 |
| 6 | 42 | (United Kingdom) Strakka Racing | 3 | 5 | Ret | 7 | 7 | 6 | 6 | 5 | 63 |
| 7 | 30 | (United States) Extreme Speed Motorsports | EX | 8 | 5 | 6 | 4 | 4 | Ret | 7 | 62 |
| 8 | 31 | (United States) Extreme Speed Motorsports | 6 | 7 | 4 | 8 | Ret | 7 | 5 | 8 | 62 |
| 9 | 35 | (France) OAK Racing | 5 | 6 | 6 | | | | | | 34 |

==== FIA Endurance Trophy for LMGTE Pro Teams ====
| Pos. | Car | Team | SIL (United Kingdom) | SPA (Belgium) | LMS (France) | NÜR (Germany) | COA (United States) | FUJ (Japan) | SHA (China) | BHR (Bahrain) | Total points |
|---|---|---|---|---|---|---|---|---|---|---|---|
| 1 | 91 | (Germany) Porsche Team Manthey | 2 | 3 | 4 | 1 | 1 | 4 | 1 | 5 | 154 |
| 2 | 51 | (Italy) AF Corse | 1 | 4 | 2 | **7** | 7 | 1 | **2** | **2** | 149 |
| 3 | 71 | (Italy) AF Corse | 3 | 7 | 1 | 3 | 3 | **3** | 4 | 6 | 137 |
| 4 | 92 | (Germany) Porsche Team Manthey | 7 | 2 | Ret | 2 | 2 | 2 | 3 | 1 | 118 |
| 4 | 99 | (United Kingdom) Aston Martin Racing V8 | 6 | **1** | **5** | 5 | **4** | 7 | 5 | 7 | 100 |
| 6 | 95 | (United Kingdom) Aston Martin Racing | **4** | 6 | 3 | 4 | 5 | 5 | | 4 | 95 |
| 7 | 97 | (United Kingdom) Aston Martin Racing | 5 | 5 | Ret | 6 | 6 | 6 | 6 | 3 | 67 |

==== FIA Endurance Trophy for LMGTE Am Teams ====
| Pos. | Car | Team | SIL (United Kingdom) | SPA (Belgium) | LMS (France) | NÜR (Germany) | COA (United States) | FUJ (Japan) | SHA (China) | BHR (Bahrain) | Total points |
|---|---|---|---|---|---|---|---|---|---|---|---|
| 1 | 72 | (Russia) SMP Racing | 3 | 3 | 1 | **1** | 1 | **6** | 3 | 5 | 165 |
| 2 | 83 | (Italy) AF Corse | 2 | 2 | 3 | 3 | 3 | 3 | 1 | 4 | 148 |
| 3 | 98 | (United Kingdom) Aston Martin Racing | **1** | **1** | **NC** | 2 | 5 | 2 | **2** | **1** | 144 |
| 4 | 77 | (Germany) Dempsey Racing-Proton | 6 | 5 | 2 | 4 | **4** | 1 | 4 | 3 | 131 |
| 5 | 88 | (Germany) Abu Dhabi-Proton Racing | 5 | 4 | Ret | 6 | 2 | 5 | 7 | 2 | 82 |
| 6 | 96 | (United Kingdom) Aston Martin Racing | 4 | 6 | Ret | 7 | 6 | 7 | 6 | 7 | 54 |
| 7 | 50 | (France) Larbre Compétition | 7 | Ret | Ret | 5 | 7 | 4 | 5 | 6 | 52 |
