= 2004 Formula BMW UK season =

Seasons
- ← none 2005 →

The 2004 Formula BMW UK season was the inaugural season of the British Formula BMW championship for young drivers making the transition to car racing. The series supported every BTCC round apart from round nine at Rockingham which supported the Days of Thunder championship. Tim Bridgman won the championship with his small family fun team after scoring in every round. Ayrton Senna's nephew Bruno Senna also took part in the championship towards the end of the season.

== Teams and drivers ==
All cars were Mygale FB02 chassis powered by BMW engines. Guest drivers in italics. All teams were British-registered.

Team	No	Driver	Class	Rounds
Privateer	1	(United Kingdom) Tim Bridgman		All
Soper Sport	2	(United Kingdom) Phil Glew		All
Soper Sport	7	(United Kingdom) Jordan Wise	R	All
Soper Sport	10	(Brazil) Marcos Vilhena	R	1–5
Soper Sport	38	(United Kingdom) Dean Smith	R	5–10
Panther Motorsport	3	(United Kingdom) Simon Walker-Hansell		All
Panther Motorsport	4	(United Kingdom) Ross Curnow	R	All
Panther Motorsport	15	(United Kingdom) Jack Goldstraw	R	All
Team Virgin Mobile Barwell	5	(United Kingdom) Sam Edwards		1–4
Team Virgin Mobile Barwell	6	(United Kingdom) Matt Harris		All
Team Virgin Mobile Barwell	16	(United Kingdom) Ollie Smith		All
Team Virgin Mobile Barwell	56	(United Kingdom) Steve Roberts		8–10
Fortec Motorsport	8	(Norway) Stian Sørlie		All
Fortec Motorsport	9	(United Kingdom) James Sutton		All
Carlin Motorsport	11	(United Kingdom) Sam Bird	R	All
Carlin Motorsport	12	(Denmark) Christian Bakkerud		All
Carlin Motorsport	20	(Brazil) Bruno Senna		8–10
Carlin M/sport - Team Portugal	21	(Portugal) Duarte Félix da Costa		1–2, 4–10
Carlin M/sport - Team Portugal	22	(Portugal) João Urbano		All
Motaworld - Quantexe Racing	29	(United Kingdom) Josh Fisher		All
Motaworld - Quantexe Racing	30	(United Kingdom) Ry Leon		All
SWR Omegaland/Pioneer	34	(United Kingdom) Oliver Turvey		1–4, 6–10
SWR Omegaland/Pioneer	38	(United Kingdom) Dean Smith	R	1–4
SWR Omegaland/Pioneer	40	(Republic of Ireland) Peter Dempsey		6–10
SWR Omegaland/Pioneer	41	(United Kingdom) Craig Fleming		2–6
SWR Omegaland/Pioneer	42	(United Kingdom) Matt Howson		7–10

Icon	Class
R	Rookie Cup

== Results and standings ==
=== Calendar ===
Round	Circuit	Date	Pole position	Fastest lap	Winning driver	Winning team
1	Thruxton	11 April	(Norway) Stian Sørlie	(Norway) Stian Sørlie	(United Kingdom) Simon Walker-Hansell	Panther Motorsport
2	Thruxton	11 April	(Norway) Stian Sørlie	(Norway) Stian Sørlie	(United Kingdom) Tim Bridgman	Privateer
3	Brands Hatch (Indy)	25 April	(United Kingdom) Phil Glew	(United Kingdom) Tim Bridgman	(United Kingdom) Phil Glew	Soper Sport
4	Brands Hatch (Indy)	25 April	(United Kingdom) Phil Glew	(United Kingdom) Phil Glew	(United Kingdom) Phil Glew	Soper Sport
5	Silverstone (International)	9 May	(Portugal) João Urbano	(United Kingdom) Tim Bridgman	(United Kingdom) Tim Bridgman	Privateer
6	Silverstone (International)	9 May	(United Kingdom) Tim Bridgman	(Norway) Stian Sørlie	(United Kingdom) Josh Fisher	Motaworld - Quantexe Racing
7	Oulton Park (Island)	23 May	(United Kingdom) Josh Fisher	(United Kingdom) James Sutton	(United Kingdom) James Sutton	Fortec Motorsport
8	Oulton Park (Island)	23 May	(Norway) Stian Sørlie	(United Kingdom) Phil Glew	(Portugal) João Urbano	Carlin M/sport - Team Portugal
9	Mondello Park	13 June	(United Kingdom) Josh Fisher	(United Kingdom) Josh Fisher	(United Kingdom) Josh Fisher	Motaworld - Quantexe Racing
10	Mondello Park	13 June	(United Kingdom) James Sutton	(United Kingdom) Josh Fisher	(United Kingdom) Simon Walker-Hansell	Carlin Motorsport
11	Croft	24 July	(United Kingdom) Josh Fisher	(United Kingdom) James Sutton	(United Kingdom) Josh Fisher	Motaworld - Quantexe Racing
12	Croft	25 July	(United Kingdom) Josh Fisher	(Portugal) João Urbano	(United Kingdom) Josh Fisher	Motaworld - Quantexe Racing
13	Knockhill	8 August	(United Kingdom) Ross Curnow	(Portugal) João Urbano	(United Kingdom) Ross Curnow	Panther Motorsport
14^{1}	Knockhill	8 August	(United Kingdom) Matt Howson	(Portugal) João Urbano	(Norway) Stian Sørlie	Fortec Motorsport
15	Brands Hatch (Indy)	22 August	(Portugal) João Urbano	(Portugal) João Urbano	(Portugal) João Urbano	Carlin M/sport - Team Portugal
16	Brands Hatch (Indy)	22 August	(United Kingdom) James Sutton	(United Kingdom) James Sutton	(United Kingdom) James Sutton	Fortec Motorsport
17	Rockingham (International Super Sports Car Long)	5 September	(Portugal) João Urbano	(Portugal) João Urbano	(Portugal) João Urbano	Carlin M/sport - Team Portugal
18	Rockingham (International Super Sports Car Long)	5 September	(United Kingdom) James Sutton	(United Kingdom) Tim Bridgman	(United Kingdom) Oliver Turvey	Team SWR Pioneer
19	Donington Park (National)	26 September	(United Kingdom) Matt Howson	(United Kingdom) Matt Howson	(United Kingdom) Matt Howson	Team SWR Pioneer
20	Donington Park (National)	26 September	(United Kingdom) Matt Howson	(Portugal) João Urbano	(United Kingdom) Tim Bridgman	Privateer

1. –Race was stopped due to a big accident involving Jordan Wise and Duarte Félix da Costa. Half points were awarded.

=== Drivers Championship ===
Pos	Driver	THR		BRH		SIL		OUL		MON		CRO		KNO		BRH		ROC		DON		Pts
1	(United Kingdom) Tim Bridgman	5	1	2	2	1	5	8	6	2	3	4	3	8	9	3	5	3	2	2	1	230
2	(United Kingdom) Phil Glew	6	3	1	1	4	2	3	2	3	5	2	4	Ret	8	4	3	4	4	4	9	210.5
3	(United Kingdom) Josh Fisher	4	18	4	6	Ret	1	2	Ret	1	4	1	1	7	5	8	4	6	5	7	5	178
4	(Portugal) João Urbano	3	4	3	3	Ret	4	Ret	1	6	7	6	7	16	2	1	2	1	Ret	15	2	173.5
5	(United Kingdom) James Sutton	14	Ret	17	5	3	18	1	7	13	2	5	2	10	6	2	1	2	12	Ret	12	136
6	(Norway) Stian Sørlie	2	Ret	Ret	4	Ret	6	10	3	5	8	3	5	2	1	7	8	Ret	7	3	4	133
7	(United Kingdom) Oliver Turvey	9	10	7	12	7	11	9	4			9	6	5	7	5	6	7	1	17	7	83
8	(United Kingdom) Ross Curnow	10	12	11	16	15	7	6	Ret	4	6	7	11	1	3	15	10	Ret	Ret	12	3	70
9	(United Kingdom) Simon Walker-Hansell	1	5	9	11	6	Ret	Ret	DNS	12	1	16	9	Ret	Ret	12	15	9	8	Ret	Ret	63
10	(United Kingdom) Ollie Smith	11	8	5	8	2	Ret	Ret	8	8	Ret	11	8	4	DSQ	DNS	14	11	6	5	11	62
11	(Denmark) Christian Bakkerud	Ret	2	8	7	9	3	5	Ret	9	Ret	8	Ret	15	16	14	12	Ret	3	Ret	Ret	61
12	(United Kingdom) Matt Howson													3	4	20	7	5	Ret	1	Ret	49
13	(Portugal) Duarte Félix da Costa	7	7	6	Ret			7	12	7	Ret	10	10	9	Ret	13	Ret	8	15	9	Ret	31
14	(United Kingdom) Sam Bird	17	17	19	10	12	12	4	5	10	16	14	14	11	12	9	13	Ret	16	11	15	22
15	(United Kingdom) Dean Smith	DNS	15	14	17	5	17	Ret	13	15	14	20	16	12	14	11	17	12	10	8	6	18
16	(United Kingdom) Jack Goldstraw	16	16	18	18	14	15	11	Ret	17	9	18	Ret	6	10	18	18	10	13	14	8	12.5
17	(United Kingdom) Sam Edwards	8	6	12	13	Ret	9	13	Ret													11
18	(United Kingdom) Matt Harris	Ret	9	10	15	Ret	10	Ret	9	Ret	12	13	12	13	15	16	20	Ret	9	10	10	10
19	(United Kingdom) Craig Fleming			16	9	8	8	12	Ret	11	15	15	Ret									8
20	(United Kingdom) Jordan Wise	13	11	Ret	14	11	16	15	11	14	13	19	13	Ret	Ret	6	11	Ret	18	Ret	Ret	6
=	(Brazil) Bruno Senna															Ret	16	13	Ret	6	16	6
22	(Republic of Ireland) Peter Dempsey											12	Ret	17	11	10	9	Ret	11	Ret	DNS	3
23	(Brazil) Marcos Vilhena	12	13	13	Ret	13	13	14	10	Ret	10											2
24	(United Kingdom) Ry Leon	15	14	15	Ret	10	14	16	14	16	11	17	15	14	13	17	19	Ret	17	13	14	1
	(United Kingdom) Steve Roberts															19	21	14	14	16	13	0
Pos	Driver	THR		BRH		SIL		OUL		MON		CRO		KNO		BRH		ROC		DON		Pts

== Sources ==
- tsl-timing.com
- https://www.driverdb.com/championships/standings/formula-bmw-uk/2004/ driverdb.com
