= 2005 Formula BMW World Final =

Race details
Date	16 December 2005
Official name	1st Formula BMW World Final
Location	Sakhir, Bahrain
Course	Permanent racing facility 3.823 km (2.376 mi)
Distance	Pre-Final Race; 22 laps, 84.106 km (52.261 mi); Main Race; 25 laps, 95.575 km (59.388 mi)
- Pre-Final Race

Pole
Driver	(Germany) Marco Holzer	AM-Holzer Rennsport

Podium
First	(Germany) Marco Holzer	AM-Holzer Rennsport
Second	(Germany) Nico Hülkenberg	Josef Kaufmann Racing
Third	(Portugal) João Urbano	ASL Team Mücke Motorsport
- Main Race

Pole
Driver	(Germany) Marco Holzer	AM-Holzer Rennsport

Podium
First	(Germany) Marco Holzer	AM-Holzer Rennsport
Second	(Switzerland) Sébastien Buemi	ASL Team Mücke Motorsport
Third	(Germany) Nico Hülkenberg	Josef Kaufmann Racing

The 2005 Formula BMW World Final was the first Formula BMW World Final race held at Bahrain International Circuit on 16 December 2005. The race was won by AM-Holzer Rennsport GmbH's driver Marco Holzer, who finished ahead Sébastien Buemi and Nico Hülkenberg.

== Drivers and teams ==
2005 Entry List
Team	No	Driver	Main series
(Germany) 4speedmedia GmbH	2	(Lithuania) Andzej Dzikevic	Formula BMW ADAC
(Germany) 4speedmedia GmbH	3	(Latvia) Harald Schlegelmilch	Formula BMW ADAC
(Germany) AM-Holzer Rennsport GmbH	4	(Germany) Marco Holzer	Formula BMW ADAC
(Germany) AM-Holzer Rennsport GmbH	5	(Germany) Dominik Wasem	Formula BMW ADAC
(Germany) ASL Team Mücke Motorsport	6	(Switzerland) Sébastien Buemi	Formula BMW ADAC
(Germany) ASL Team Mücke Motorsport	7	(Monaco) Stefano Coletti	Formula BMW ADAC
(Germany) ASL Team Mücke Motorsport	8	(Germany) Tobias Hegewald	Formula BMW ADAC
(Germany) ASL Team Mücke Motorsport	9	(Italy) Fabio Onidi	Formula BMW ADAC
(Germany) ASL Team Mücke Motorsport	10	(United States) Jonathan Summerton	Formula BMW ADAC
(Germany) ASL Team Mücke Motorsport	11	(Portugal) João Urbano	Formula BMW ADAC
(Canada) Team Autotecnica	14	(United States) Matt Lee	Formula BMW USA
(Canada) Team Autotecnica	15	(Canada) Robert Wickens	Formula BMW USA
(United Kingdom) Mark Burdett Motorsport	16	(United Kingdom) Jonathan Legris	Formula BMW UK
(United Kingdom) Coles Racing	17	(United Kingdom) Dean Smith	Formula BMW UK
(South Korea) Team E-Rain	18	(Bahrain) Salman Al Khalifa	Formula BMW Asia
(South Korea) Team E-Rain	19	(India) Armaan Ebrahim	Formula BMW Asia
(United States) Eurointernational SRL	20	(Italy) Edoardo Piscopo	Formula BMW USA
(United Kingdom) Filsell Motorsport	21	(United Kingdom) Matt Howson	Formula BMW UK
(United Kingdom) Fortec Motorsport	22	(United Kingdom) Sam Bird	Formula BMW UK
(United Kingdom) Fortec Motorsport	23	(Norway) Stian Sørlie	Formula BMW UK
(Germany) Josef Kaufmann Racing	24	(Germany) Nico Hülkenberg	Formula BMW ADAC
(Germany) Josef Kaufmann Racing	25	(Germany) Christian Vietoris	Formula BMW ADAC
(Malaysia) Meritus	26	(Bahrain) Hamad Al Fardan	Formula BMW Asia
(Malaysia) Meritus	27	(Thailand) Robert Boughey	Formula BMW Asia
(Malaysia) Meritus	28	(Australia) James Davison	Formula BMW USA
(Malaysia) Meritus	29	(United States) Race Johnson	Formula BMW USA
(Malaysia) Meritus	30	(United States) Reed Stevens	Formula BMW USA
(United Kingdom) Motaworld Racing	31	(Australia) Nathan Antunes	Formula BMW UK
(United Kingdom) Motaworld Racing	32	(United Kingdom) Jordan Wise	Formula BMW UK
(United Kingdom) Nexa Racing	33	(United Kingdom) Ross Curnow	Formula BMW UK
(United Kingdom) Nexa Racing	34	(United Kingdom) Euan Hankey	Formula BMW UK
(United Kingdom) Promactecme/Soper Sport	35	(United Kingdom) Philip Glew	Formula BMW UK
(United Kingdom) Team SWR	36	(United Kingdom) Jack Goldstraw	Formula BMW UK
(United Kingdom) Team SWR	37	(United Kingdom) Matt Harris	Formula BMW UK
(United Kingdom) Team SWR	38	(United Kingdom) Oliver Turvey	Formula BMW UK

== Results ==
=== Qualifying ===
==== Group 1 ====
Pos	No	Name	Team	Time
1	24	(Germany) Nico Hülkenberg	Josef Kaufmann Racing	1:27.171
2	2	(Germany) Marco Holzer	AM-Holzer Rennsport GmbH	1:27.282
3	11	(Portugal) João Urbano	ASL Team Mücke Motorsport	1:27.373
4	22	(United Kingdom) Sam Bird	Fortec Motorsport	1:27.712
5	10	(United States) Jonathan Summerton	ASL Team Mücke Motorsport	1:27.825
6	23	(Norway) Stian Sørlie	Fortec Motorsport	1:27.961
7	31	(Australia) Nathan Antunes	Motaworld Racing	1:28.006
8	5	(Germany) Dominik Wasem	AM-Holzer Rennsport GmbH	1:28.087
9	38	(United Kingdom) Oliver Turvey	Team SWR	1:28.122
10	7	(Monaco) Stefano Coletti	ASL Team Mücke Motorsport	1:28.202
11	29	(United States) Race Johnson	Meritus	1:28.212
12	30	(United States) Reed Stevens	Meritus	1:28.382
13	32	(United Kingdom) Jordan Wise	Motaworld Racing	1:28.465
14	36	(United Kingdom) Jack Goldstraw	Team SWR	1:28.873
15	28	(Australia) James Davison	Meritus	1:28.888
16	25	(Germany) Christian Vietoris	Josef Kaufmann Racing	1:28.950
17	37	(United Kingdom) Matt Harris	Team SWR	1:29.058

==== Group 2 ====
Pos	No	Name	Team	Time
1	20	(Italy) Edoardo Piscopo	Eurointernational SRL	1:27.402
2	6	(Switzerland) Sébastien Buemi	ASL Team Mücke Motorsport	1:27.452
3	21	(United Kingdom) Matt Howson	Filsell Motorsport	1:27.638
4	33	(United Kingdom) Ross Curnow	Nexa Racing	1:27.810
5	14	(United States) Matt Lee	Team Autotecnica	1:27.834
6	26	(Bahrain) Hamad Al Fardan	Meritus	1:27.986
7	19	(India) Armaan Ebrahim	Team E-Rain	1:28.005
8	34	(United Kingdom) Euan Hankey	Nexa Racing	1:28.060
9	8	(Germany) Tobias Hegewald	ASL Team Mücke Motorsport	1:29.123
10	3	(Latvia) Harald Schlegelmilch	4speedmedia GmbH	1:28.209
11	17	(United Kingdom) Dean Smith	Coles Racing	1:28.391
12	35	(United Kingdom) Philip Glew	Promactecme/Soper Sport	1:28.434
13	9	(Italy) Fabio Onidi	ASL Team Mücke Motorsport	1:28.455
14	18	(Bahrain) Salman Al Khalifa	Team E-Rain	1:28.495
15	27	(Thailand) Robert Boughey	Meritus	1:28.756
16	16	(United Kingdom) Jonathan Legris	Mark Burdett Motorsport	1:28.901
17	2	(Lithuania) Andzej Dzikevic	4speedmedia GmbH	1:29.270
18	15	(Canada) Robert Wickens	Team Autotecnica	Disallowed

=== Pre-Final Race ===
Pos	No	Driver	Team	Laps	Time/Retired	Grid
1	2	(Germany) Marco Holzer	AM-Holzer Rennsport GmbH	22		1
2	24	(Germany) Nico Hülkenberg	Josef Kaufmann Racing	22	+0.519	2
3	11	(Portugal) João Urbano	ASL Team Mücke Motorsport	22	+6.891	5
4	6	(Switzerland) Sébastien Buemi	ASL Team Mücke Motorsport	22	+7.691	3
5	22	(United Kingdom) Sam Bird	Fortec Motorsport	22	+10.438	4
6	20	(Italy) Edoardo Piscopo	Eurointernational SRL	22	+16.245	10
7	19	(India) Armaan Ebrahim	Team E-Rain	22	+22.069	12
8	21	(United Kingdom) Matt Howson	Filsell Motorsport	22	+22.796	9
9	5	(Germany) Dominik Wasem	AM-Holzer Rennsport GmbH	22	+26.489	15
10	10	(United States) Jonathan Summerton	ASL Team Mücke Motorsport	22	+26.805	11
11	14	(United States) Matt Lee	Team Autotecnica	22	+31.676	14
12	32	(United Kingdom) Jordan Wise	Motaworld Racing	22	+35.664	18
13	9	(Italy) Fabio Onidi	ASL Team Mücke Motorsport	22	+40.135	22
14	7	(Monaco) Stefano Coletti	ASL Team Mücke Motorsport	22	+40.352	26
15	8	(Germany) Tobias Hegewald	ASL Team Mücke Motorsport	22	+41.534	21
16	28	(Australia) James Davison	Meritus	22	+42.394	20
17	3	(Latvia) Harald Schlegelmilch	4speedmedia GmbH	22	+44.702	23
18	31	(Australia) Nathan Antunes	Motaworld Racing	22	+46.978	28
19	35	(United Kingdom) Philip Glew	Promactecme/Soper Sport	22	+47.488	25
20	37	(United Kingdom) Matt Harris	Team SWR	22	+47.983	32
21	17	(United Kingdom) Dean Smith	Coles Racing	22	+49.383	27
22	2	(Lithuania) Andzej Dzikevic	4speedmedia GmbH	22	+53.115	33
23	27	(Thailand) Robert Boughey	Meritus	22	+54.468	30
24	16	(United Kingdom) Jonathan Legris	Mark Burdett Motorsport	22	+ 57.843	29
25	30	(United States) Reed Stevens	Meritus	22	+ 1:08.150	17
26	34	(United Kingdom) Euan Hankey	Nexa Racing	22	+ 1:13.307	16
27	15	(Canada) Robert Wickens	Team Autotecnica	22	+ 1:20.055	7
28	23	(Norway) Stian Sørlie	Fortec Motorsport	21	+1 lap	8
29	33	(United Kingdom) Ross Curnow	Nexa Racing	20	+2 laps	6
NC	38	(United Kingdom) Oliver Turvey	Team SWR	14	+8 laps	24
Ret	18	(Bahrain) Salman Al Khalifa	Team E-Rain	12	Accident	19
Ret	26	(Bahrain) Hamad Al Fardan	Meritus	0	Accident	13
DNS	25	(Germany) Christian Vietoris	Josef Kaufmann Racing	0	Did not start	35
DNS	29	(United States) Race Johnson	Meritus	0	Did not start	34
DNS	36	(United Kingdom) Jack Goldstraw	Team SWR	0	Did not start	31

=== Final Race ===
Pos	No	Driver	Team	Laps	Time/Retired	Grid
1	2	(Germany) Marco Holzer	AM-Holzer Rennsport GmbH	25		1
2	6	(Switzerland) Sébastien Buemi	ASL Team Mücke Motorsport	25	+1.579	4
3	24	(Germany) Nico Hülkenberg	Josef Kaufmann Racing	25	+6.969	2
4	22	(United Kingdom) Sam Bird	Fortec Motorsport	25	+8.880	5
5	31	(Australia) Nathan Antunes	Motaworld Racing	25	+12.845	18
6	15	(Canada) Robert Wickens	Team Autotecnica	25	+12.981	27
7	33	(United Kingdom) Ross Curnow	Nexa Racing	25	+13.100	29
8	5	(Germany) Dominik Wasem	AM-Holzer Rennsport GmbH	25	+13.511	9
9	21	(United Kingdom) Matt Howson	Filsell Motorsport	25	+13.959	8
10	28	(Australia) James Davison	Meritus	25	+13.982	16
11	2	(Lithuania) Andzej Dzikevic	4speedmedia GmbH	25	+18.730	22
12	17	(United Kingdom) Dean Smith	Coles Racing	25	+22.746	21
13	37	(United Kingdom) Matt Harris	Team SWR	25	+23.256	20
14	14	(United States) Matt Lee	Team Autotecnica	25	+25.519	11
15	27	(Thailand) Robert Boughey	Meritus	25	+25.981	23
16	35	(United Kingdom) Philip Glew	Promactecme/Soper Sport	25	+26.944	19
17	3	(Latvia) Harald Schlegelmilch	4speedmedia GmbH	25	+28.122	17
18	26	(Bahrain) Hamad Al Fardan	Meritus	25	+29.212	32
19	30	(United States) Reed Stevens	Meritus	22	+29.997	25
20	23	(Norway) Stian Sørlie	Fortec Motorsport	25	+1 lap	28
21	16	(United Kingdom) Jonathan Legris	Mark Burdett Motorsport	25	+1 lap	24
22	38	(United Kingdom) Oliver Turvey	Team SWR	25	+1 lap	30
Ret	19	(India) Armaan Ebrahim	Team E-Rain	19	Retirement	7
Ret	8	(Germany) Tobias Hegewald	ASL Team Mücke Motorsport	19	Retirement	15
Ret	7	(Monaco) Stefano Coletti	ASL Team Mücke Motorsport	10	Accident	14
Ret	10	(United States) Jonathan Summerton	ASL Team Mücke Motorsport	10	Accident	10
Ret	34	(United Kingdom) Euan Hankey	Nexa Racing	10	Retirement	26
Ret	36	(United Kingdom) Jack Goldstraw	Team SWR	2	Accident	35
Ret	18	(Bahrain) Salman Al Khalifa	Team E-Rain	2	Accident	31
Ret	11	(Portugal) João Urbano	ASL Team Mücke Motorsport	0	Retirement	3
Ret	32	(United Kingdom) Jordan Wise	Motaworld Racing	0	Retirement	12
Ret	9	(Italy) Fabio Onidi	ASL Team Mücke Motorsport	0	Retirement	13
EX	20	(Italy) Edoardo Piscopo	Eurointernational SRL	22	Excluded	6
DNS	25	(Germany) Christian Vietoris	Josef Kaufmann Racing	0	Did not start	33
DNS	29	(United States) Race Johnson	Meritus	0	Did not start	34

- ^1 Nico Hülkenberg given 10-second penalty.
- ^2 Edoardo Piscopo was excluded from race protocol.
