= 2016 6 Hours of Nürburgring =

Racing event held in 2016

(Germany) 2016 6 Hours of Nürburgring
Event information
- Round 4 of 9 in the 2016 FIA World Endurance Championship
- Date: 24 July 2016
- Location: Nürburg
- Venue: Nürburgring
- Duration: 6 Hours

Results
- Laps completed: 194
- Distance (km): 998.712
- Distance (miles): 620.5672
- LMP1

Pole position
- Time: 1:39.444
- Team: (Germany) Audi Sport Team Joest
- Drivers: (Germany) André Lotterer (Switzerland) Marcel Fässler

Winners
- Team: (Germany) Porsche Team
- Drivers: (Germany) Timo Bernhard (New Zealand) Brendon Hartley (Australia) Mark Webber
- LMP2

Winners
- Team: (France) Signatech Alpine
- Drivers: (France) Nicolas Lapierre (United States) Gustavo Menezes (Monaco) Stéphane Richelmi
- LMGTE Pro

Winners
- Team: (Italy) AF Corse
- Drivers: (United Kingdom) James Calado (Italy) Gianmaria Bruni
- LMGTE Am

Winners
- Team: (United Kingdom) Aston Martin Racing
- Drivers: (Canada) Paul Dalla Lana (Portugal) Pedro Lamy (Austria) Mathias Lauda

The 2016 6 Hours of Nürburgring (formally the WEC 6 Hours of Nürburgring) was a six-hour endurance sports car racing event held for Le Mans Prototype and Le Mans Grand Touring Endurance cars at the Nürburgring, Nürburg, Germany on 24 July 2016. The Nürburgring round served as the fourth race of the 2016 FIA World Endurance Championship, and was the second running of the event as part of the championship. A total of 58,000 people spectated the event.

The No. 7 Audi driven by André Lotterer and Marcel Fässler won the pole position by posting the fastest lap in qualifying and Fässler maintained the car's advantage throughout the race's early phase withstanding pressure from Timo Bernhard's No. 1 Porsche. Brendon Hartley took over the lead when both Audi cars had slow pit stops and held it until Marc Lieb in the sister Porsche moved past him, but later lost his advantage because he made a pit stop for dive plane repairs after damaging it while lapping a slower car. Mark Webber held the first position until Neel Jani in the sister No. 2 Porsche drew closer to him and passed him. However Jani was handed a drive-through penalty, giving the lead back to Webber. Bernhard later relieved Webber of his driving duties and held the lead for the remainder of the race to secure the victory. Audi's No. 8 car of Loïc Duval, Lucas di Grassi and Oliver Jarvis finished second and their teammates Lotterer and Fässler took third.

The Le Mans Prototype 2 (LMP2) category was won by the Signatech Alpine of Gustavo Menezes, Nicolas Lapierre and Stéphane Richelmi with Ricardo González, Filipe Albuquerque and Bruno Senna in RGR Sport's No. 36 in second. Gianmaria Bruni and James Calado's No. 51 AF Corse Ferrari took the victory in the Le Mans Grand Touring Endurance Professional (LMGTE Pro) class with Sam Bird and Davide Rigon in the sister No. 71 car second. Bruni took the class lead from Nicki Thiim in the No. 95 Aston Martin Racing car in the race's late period and held on to take his and Calado's first win of the season. The Le Mans Grand Touring Endurance Amateur (LMGTE Am) category was won by Pedro Lamy, Mathias Lauda and Paul Dalla Lana after they led the final 48 laps of the race to secure their second victory of the season, ahead of the No. 83 AF Corse of François Perrodo, Emmanuel Collard and Rui Águas.

The result meant Lieb, Jani and Romain Dumas maintained their Drivers' Championship lead with 106 points, 33 ahead of second-place finishers Duval, di Grassi and Jarvis, and a further three in front of Stéphane Sarrazin, Mike Conway and Kamui Kobayashi. Lotterer and Fässler remained in fourth place and Dominik Kraihamer, Alexandre Imperatori and Mathéo Tuscher rounded out the top five. Porsche remained in the lead of the Manufacturers' Championship but their advantage over Audi was reduced by two points and Toyota maintained third position with five races left in the season.

== Background ==
=== Entrants ===
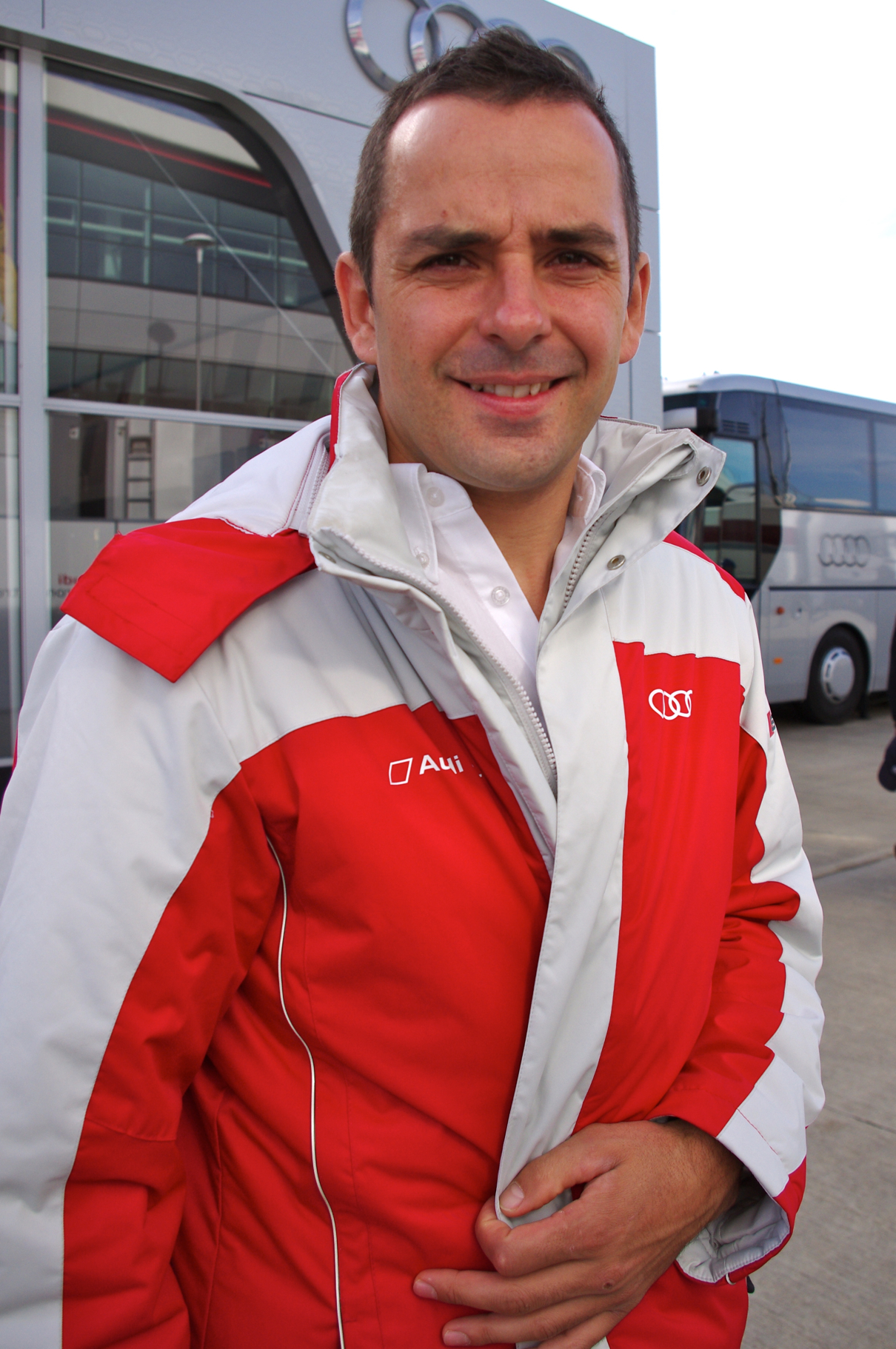
Benoît Tréluyer (pictured in 2013) missed his first World Endurance Championship race due to injury.

A total of 33 cars were officially entered for the 6 Hours of Nürburgring, with the bulk of the entries in Le Mans Prototype 1 (LMP1) and Le Mans Prototype 2 (LMP2). The 2015 race winners, Porsche, returned to defend their title. Three manufacturers, Porsche, Toyota and Audi Sport Team Joest, were represented in LMP1 by two cars each. Rebellion Racing and ByKolles Racing were the two representatives of the LMP1 privateer teams. Audi driver Benoît Tréluyer was forced to miss the race because of a spinal column injury he sustained after falling off his mountain bike in a training exercise. Audi chose not to employ a replacement which meant the team's No. 7 car would be driven by his co-drivers Marcel Fässler and André Lotterer as a two-person entry. It was the first World Endurance Championship race Tréluyer missed since he joined the series in 2012. Mathias Beche returned to the series full-time in the 2016 season, replacing Nelson Piquet Jr. who was under contract to participate in the season's first three races in Rebellion Racing's No. 12 car.

LMP2 consisted of 11 cars with 33 drivers in six different types of chassis. Following the departure of Nathanaël Berthon before the start of the 24 Hours of Le Mans, Alex Brundle was signed by G-Drive to drive the team's No. 26 Oreca 05 alongside regular drivers Roman Rusinov and René Rast for the remainder of the season. Renault Sport Trophy competitor Lewis Williamson made his début appearance in the World Endurance Championship with Strakka Racing in its No. 42 Gibson 015S alongside Nick Leventis and Jonny Kane, replacing Danny Watts who remained part of the team for the rest of the year. Will Stevens was replaced by Antônio Pizzonia in Manor's No. 44 Oreca 05 and partnered regular co-driver Tor Graves. James Jakes was replaced by Manor with Matthew Howson who was selected because of his experience driving the team's car.

The Le Mans Grand Touring Endurance Professional (LMGTE Pro) field consisted of four manufacturers (Aston Martin, Ford, Ferrari and Porsche), while the Le Mans Grand Touring Endurance Amateur (LMGTE Am) entrants consisted of six teams: Aston Martin Racing, AF Corse, KCMG, Larbre Compétition, Abu Dhabi-Proton Racing and Gulf Racing. Aston Martin Racing made changes to the driver line-ups in their No. 95 and No. 97 cars to field two drivers in line with most other teams in the category. Darren Turner was moved to the No. 97 car alongside Richie Stanaway, while Nicki Thiim and Marco Sørensen remained in the team's No. 95 vehicle as a two-person crew. The change was made to give Aston Martin an increased chance of winning the World Endurance Cup for GT Drivers. Jonny Adam and Fernando Rees remained under contract with Aston Martin but were not slated to take part in any other races in the year; Adam concentrated on sharing a TF Sport car with Derek Johnson in the British GT Championship. Paolo Ruberti returned to compete in the No. 50 Larbre Compétition car after missing the 24 Hours of Le Mans due to injury, while Billy Johnson returned to North American racing.

=== Preview ===
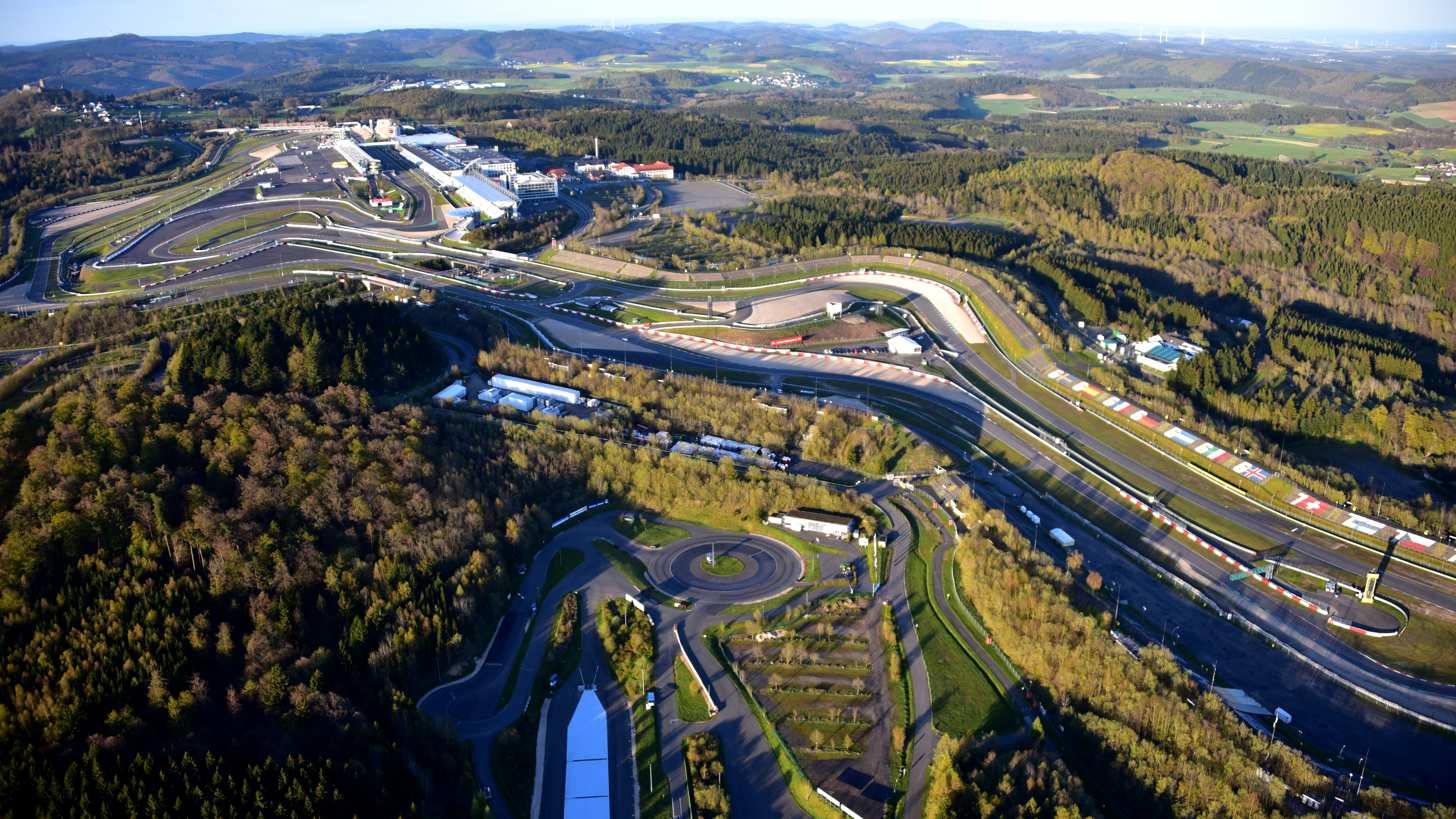
The Nürburgring GP-Strecke, where the race was held.

The 6 Hours of Nürburgring was confirmed as part of the FIA World Endurance Championship's 2016 schedule in December 2015 in a meeting of the FIA World Motor Sport Council in Paris. It was the fourth of nine scheduled endurance sports car rounds of the 2016 FIA World Endurance Championship, and the second running of the event as part of the championship. The race was held on 24 July at the Nürburgring GP-Strecke circuit with two preceding days of practice and qualifying. The Nürburgring GP-Strecke track layout, last modified in 2002, is 5.148 kilometres (3.199 mi) long and is composed of sixteen corners. The 2016 running of the event saw the first usage of the tighter Veedol Chicane on the back straight in the World Endurance Championship as was previously used in Formula One.

Before the race Porsche drivers Marc Lieb, Neel Jani and Romain Dumas led the Drivers' Championship with 94 points, 39 ahead of their nearest rivals Loïc Duval, Lucas di Grassi and Oliver Jarvis who were a further one in front of third-placed Kamui Kobayashi, Mike Conway and Stéphane Sarrazin. Lotterer, Fassler and Treulyer were fourth with 35 points and Dominik Kraihamer, Alexandre Imperatori and Mathéo Tuscher rounded out the top five on 30 points. Porsche were leading the Manufacturers' Championship with 127 points, 38 ahead of their nearest rival Audi in second while the third-placed manufacturer Toyota had accumulated 79 points. Porsche had so far dominated the championship, with Audi securing the 6 Hours of Spa-Francorchamps victory. Kobayashi, Conway and Sarrazin had finished second twice, and Kraihmer, Imperatori and Tuscher had secured third-place finishes on two consecutive occasions.

Several teams made modifications to their cars in preparation for the event. Porsche introduced a third (and final) aerodynamic configuration that produced a large amount of downforce and less drag. It was tested and evaluated in a four-day test session at the Circuit de Barcelona-Catalunya. Most of the car's modifications were covered by its bodywork, giving it a new front-end appearance. Because of the track's short and tight layout, Toyota elected to début an ultra-high downforce specification along with updates to the car's front and rear bodywork developed at the team's wind tunnel at their motor sport headquarters in Cologne. In the Balance of performance adjustments, the Porsche 911 RSR's weight was decreased by 15 kilograms (33 lb) and its engine power was lowered due to the vehicle's air restrictor being reduced in size by two millimetres (0.079 in). The Aston Martin Vantage GTE was equipped with the larger diameter restrictor it ran with at Spa-Francorchamps.

== Practice ==
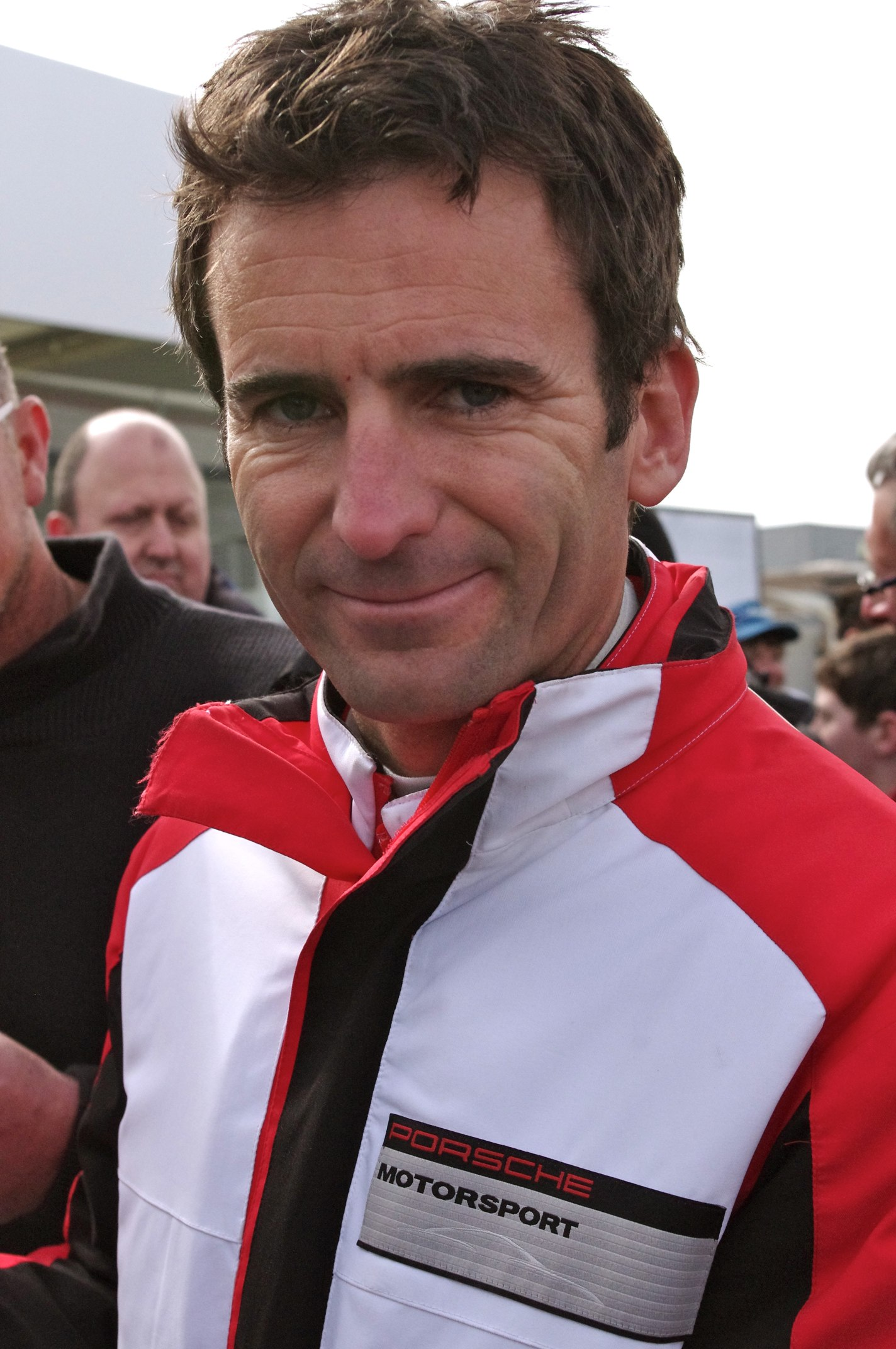
Romain Dumas (pictured in 2014) had his car damaged with a barrier collision because of a brake disc failure.

Three were three practice sessions—one 90-minute session each on Friday morning and afternoon and a one-hour session on Saturday morning—preceding Sunday's race. Lap times were not comparable to the previous year's because of the usage of the slower Veedol Chicane. Lieb's No. 2 Porsche led the 90-minute period with a fastest lap time at 1:41.703, nearly a twentieth of a second faster than teammate Brendon Hartley in the first Porsche. LMP2 was led by Brundle in the No. 26 Manor vehicle with a lap of 1:50.748 which was recorded late in the session. James Calado in the No. 51 AF Corse Ferrari was quickest in LMGTE Pro while Pedro Lamy helped Aston Martin Racing to be fastest in LMGTE Am. The session was disrupted when the rear-left suspension on Nicolas Lapierre's No. 36 Signatech Alpine failed and went off into the exit of the turn one gravel trap which prompted the deployment of the full course yellow flag. A red flag was later shown as the race control system continued to show the latter as in operation.

In the second practice session, which took place in mild weather conditions and was later affected by rain on portions of the track, Mark Webber in the No. 1 Porsche set the fastest lap time of the day at 1:40.997 20 minutes in. He finished 0.014 seconds faster than the second-placed Fässler, who, in turn, was 0.125 seconds quicker than his teammate Loïc Duval in third. Dumas' car suffered a front-left brake disc failure, causing him to drive into the turn one barriers and damage the front-end of his car. This rendered him unable to take any further part in practice and triggered a full course yellow. Stéphane Richelmi's No. 36 Signatech Alpine led LMP2 early on but Rast ended it as the fastest driver in the class with a time of 1:48.965, more than a second faster than Brundle's Strakka car. LMGTE Pro was led by Stanaway in the No. 97 Aston Martin while Rui Águas' No. 83 AF Corse Ferrari was fastest in LMGTE Am. Lamy and David Cheng were summoned by the stewards to race control after the two made contact.

The third (and final) practice session was delayed three times for 45 minutes from its original start time because foggy weather conditions prevented the medical helicopter from flying. It was initially held on a damp track and some drizzle fell towards the session's end. Cars were equipped with intermediate tyres to start the session before switching to dry slick tyres when the track dried up. Webber set the fastest timed lap at 1:41.002 with 20 minutes of practice left, and was almost three-tenths of a second faster than Anthony Davidson in Toyota's No. 5 car. Duval spun the No. 8 Audi at the second turn late in the session. Rast was the fastest LMP2 driver with a lap of 1:50.260 in the session's final minute, and was nearly seven-tenths of a second quicker than Graves in Manor's No. 44 car. Gianmaria Bruni recorded the quickest time in LMGTE Pro, driving the No. 51 AF Corse Ferrari, while David Heinemeier Hansson in the No. 88 Abu Dhabi-Proton Racing Porsche was the fastest driver in LMGTE Am, despite spinning in the session's closing minutes.

== Qualifying ==
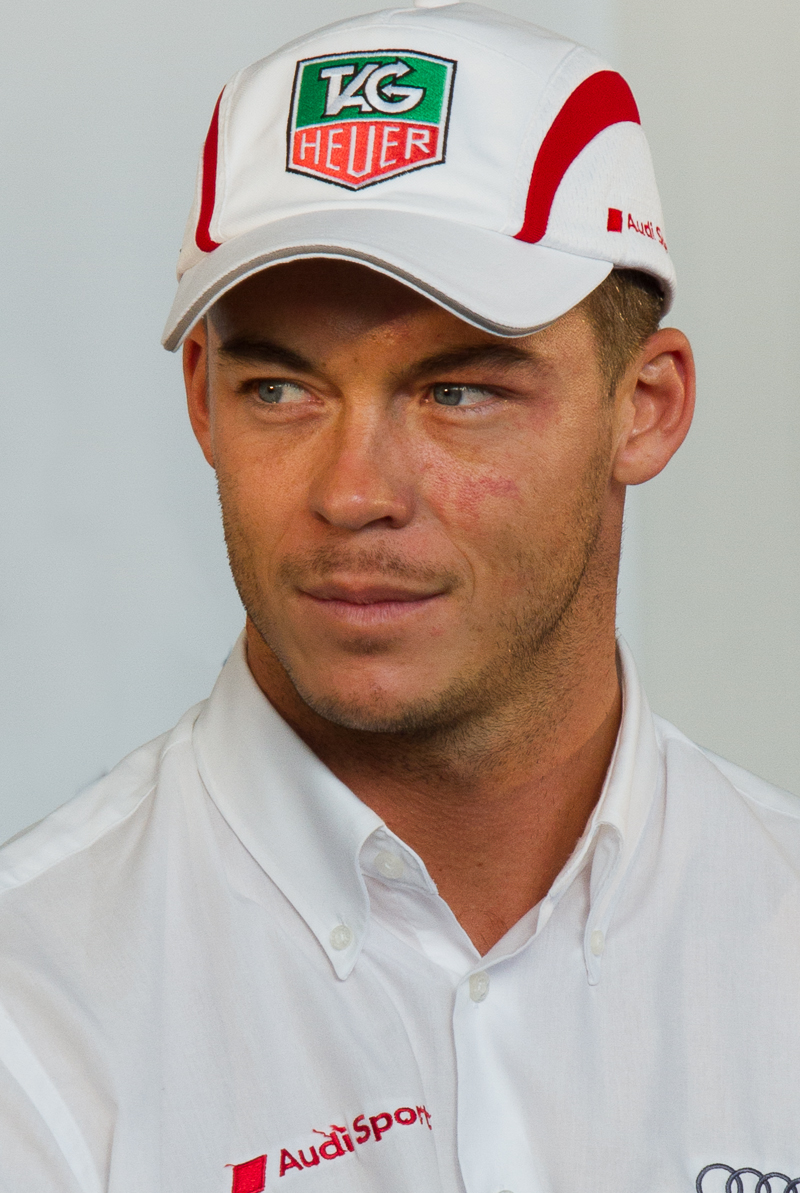
André Lotterer (pictured in 2012) secured Audi's second pole position of the season.

Friday's afternoon qualification session was divided into two groups that lasted 25 minutes each. Cars in LMGTE Pro and AM were sent out first. After a five-minute interval, LMP1 and LMP2 vehicles drove onto the track. All cars were required to be driven by two participants for one timed lap each and the starting order was determined by the competitor's fastest average times. The fastest qualifier was awarded one point which went towards the Drivers' and Manufacturers' Championships. Light rain fell before qualifying started causing teams to use intermediate tyres on their cars until a dry line emerged on the track and vehicles were equipped with dry-compound tyres. Rain later returned to the track which prevented anyone from improving on their fastest lap times. The session was marked by a battle between Audi and Porsche.

Lotterer in the No. 8 Audi was fastest on the car's first timed lap and remained quickest with an average time of 1:39.444 to clinch the team's second pole position of the season. The car was joined on the grid's front row by the sister Audi of di Grassi, Jarvis and Duval. Jarvis had his fastest time revoked after spinning at the NGK chicane late in qualifying because he had violated track limits. Porsche's No. 1 vehicle took third with Webber and Timo Bernhard behind the wheel; Webber was unable to improve on his lap time as he misjudged his braking point and went across the NGK chicane, while Bernard was delayed by LMP2 vehicles on both his laps. They were ahead of the team's second entry, driven by Lieb and Jani, and both Toyota cars took fifth and sixth. Lieb had no hybrid boost on his first lap, and braked early for the chicane on his following attempt. Davidson attributed his car's position to having one timed lap and being delayed by traffic, while Sébastien Buemi stated this was due to Toyota focusing on the race, compromising their qualifying performance. Sarrazin was unable to push hard because of the damp track. The two Rebellion cars rounded out the LMP1 qualifiers in seventh and ninth; they were separated by the No. 4 ByKolles Racing car of Simon Trummer, Oliver Webb and Pierre Kaffer.

In LMP2 the No. 26 G-Drive Oreca of Rast and Rusinov took the fastest time at 1:48,985, securing the team's fourth consecutive class pole position of the season. The car was 0.743 seconds in front of the second-placed qualifier, the No. 36 Signatech Alpine, driven by Gustavo Menezes and Richelmi. Williamson, in his first World Endurance Championship qualifying session, recorded a time of 1:49.924 with Kane setting a 1:49.600 circuit for an average lap total of 1:49.762. Thiim and Sørensen, competing in the No. 97 Aston Martin, were the fastest LMGTE Pro qualifiers with a late two-lap average of 2:01.712 which was recorded when the track was at its driest; Thiim was fastest on the intermediate tyres and had a run on dry tyres after Sørensen did one lap on the compounds. The No. 66 Ford GT of Stefan Mücke and Olivier Pla was 0.247 seconds off the place and had the class pole until the No. 97 Aston Martin's laps. Stanaway and Turner in the second Aston Martin qualified third in class, ahead of the fourth-placed Bruni and Calado in the No. 71 AF Corse Ferrari. Bruni had slick dry tyres fitted to his car and went off the track at the Mercedes Arena exit which caused his pit crew to install intermediate tyres. Abu Dhabi-Proton Racing's No. 88 Porsche driven by Patrick Long and Khaled Al Qubaisi took the LMGTE Am pole position with an average time of 2:06.011 in the first qualifying session's closing minutes. The duo were nearly two-tenths of a second ahead of Wolf Henzler's No. 88 KCMG Porsche with Paul Dalla Lana in the No. 97 Aston Martin third.

=== Post-qualifying ===
Trummer and Ed Brown failed to complete the minimum qualifying times in qualifying but were allowed to take part in the race although they were prohibited from being the starting driver for their respective entries, the No. 4 ByKolles car and the No. 30 Extreme Speed Motorsports Ligier JS P2 Nissan.

=== Qualifying results ===
Pole position winners in each class are indicated in bold.

Final qualifying classification
Pos	Class	Team	Average Time	Gap	Grid
1	**LMP1**	**No. 7 Audi Sport Team Joest**	**1:39.444**		**1**
2	LMP1	No. 8 Audi Sport Team Joest	1:39.710	+0.266	2
3	LMP1	No. 1 Porsche Team	1:39.861	+0.417	3
4	LMP1	No. 2 Porsche Team	1:39.893	+0.449	4
5	LMP1	No. 6 Toyota Gazoo Racing	1:40.639	+1.195	5
6	LMP1	No. 5 Toyota Gazoo Racing	1:40.748	+1.304	6
7	LMP1	No. 13 Rebellion Racing	1:46.081	+6.637	7
8	LMP1	No. 4 ByKolles Racing Team	1:46.907	+7.463	8
9	LMP1	No. 12 Rebellion Racing	1:47.026	+7.582	9
10	**LMP2**	**No. 26 G-Drive Racing**	**1:48.984**	**+9.540**	**10**
11	LMP2	No. 36 Signatech Alpine	1:49.727	+10.283	11
12	LMP2	No. 42 Strakka Racing	1:49.762	+10.318	12
13	LMP2	No. 43 RGR Sport by Morand	1:50.105	+10.661	13
14	LMP2	No. 44 Manor	1:50.372	+10.928	14
15	LMP2	No. 27 SMP Racing	1:50.948	+11.504	15
16	LMP2	No. 31 Extreme Speed Motorsports	1:51.194	+11.750	16
17	LMP2	No. 45 Manor	1:51.294	+11.850	17
18	LMP2	No. 37 SMP Racing	1:51.667	+12.223	18
19	LMP2	No. 35 Baxi DC Racing Alpine	1:52.506	+13.062	19
20	LMP2	No. 30 Extreme Speed Motorsports	1:56.462	+17.018	20
21	**LMGTE Pro**	**No. 95 Aston Martin Racing**	**2:01.172**	**+22.268**	**21**
22	LMGTE Pro	No. 66 Ford Chip Ganassi Team UK	2:01.959	+22.515	22
23	LMGTE Pro	No. 97 Aston Martin Racing	2:02.220	+22.776	23
24	LMGTE Pro	No. 51 AF Corse	2:02.512	+23.068	24
25	LMGTE Pro	No. 67 Ford Chip Ganassi Team UK	2:03.256	+23.812	25
26	LMGTE Pro	No. 77 Dempsey-Proton Racing	2:03.681	+24.237	26
27	**LMGTE Am**	**No. 88 Abu Dhabi-Proton Racing**	**2:06.011**	**+26.567**	**27**
28	LMGTE Am	No. 78 KCMG	2:06.197	+26.753	28
29	LMGTE Am	No. 98 Aston Martin Racing	2:06.372	+26.928	29
30	LMGTE Am	No. 83 AF Corse	2:06.589	+27.145	30
31	LMGTE Pro	No. 71 AF Corse	2:06.745	+27.301	31
32	LMGTE Am	No. 50 Larbre Compétition	2:09.127	+29.683	32
33	LMGTE Am	No. 86 Gulf Racing	2:09.820	+30.376	33

== Race ==
Weather conditions at the start were sunny and dry. The air temperature was between 20–24 °C (68–75 °F) and the track temperature ranged from 24.5–32 °C (76.1–89.6 °F); weather forecasts predicted conditions would remain consistent with a 20% chance of rain. 58,000 people attended the race. The race started at 13:00 Central European Summer Time (UTC+02:00) with the three-time Olympic gold medallist skier Maria Höfl-Riesch having the honour of waving the green flag. The No. 7 Audi maintained its pole position advantage heading into the first turn, with Bernard in Porsche's first car overtaking Audi's No. 8 vehicle around the outside for second place at the second corner. Mücke in the No. 66 Ford GT moved into the LMGTE Pro lead at turn one and Aston Martin's No. 95 car fell to third with the team's No. 97 car moving into second in class while Abu Dhabi-Proton's No. 88 Porsche maintained the LMGTE Am lead. Mücke lost the LMGTE Pro lead at the beginning of lap two when he made an error, allowing both Aston Martin cars to overtake him. The stewards investigated the start but elected to take no further action.

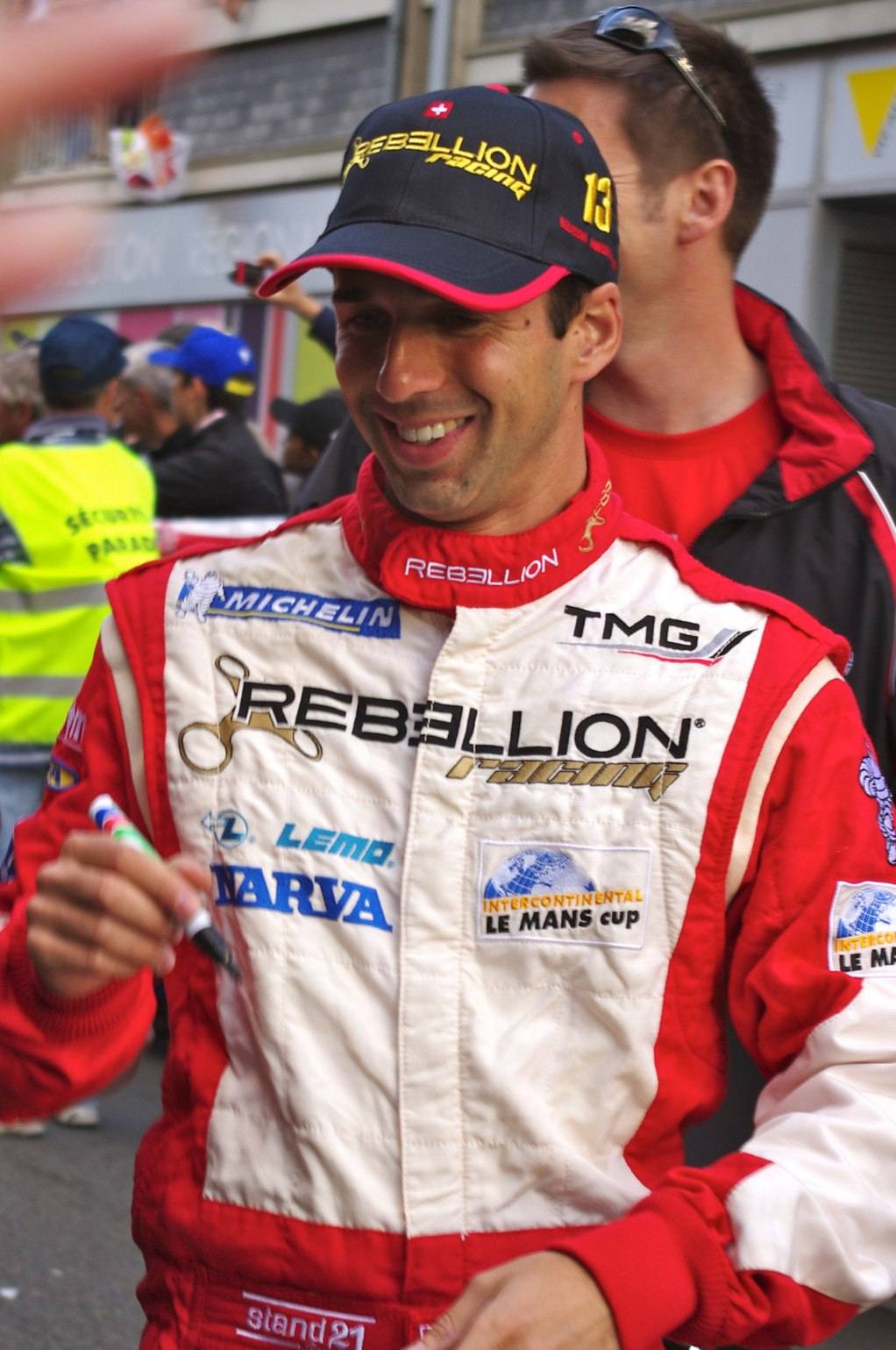
Neel Jani (pictured in 2011) battled Oliver Jarvis early in the race and eventually finished fourth overall.

Fässler extended his lead to 1.5 seconds over Jarvis while both Toyota cars were lapping one second slower than the leader's place, and the No. 4 ByKolles car moved in front of Rebellion Racing's No. 13 vehicle. Bernard lost control of his car while lapping one of the Ford GT entrants, allowing Jarvis to close up to him. Bernard attempted to pass Fässler around the outside at turn one for first position but the latter defended his line and narrowly avoided going wide off the track. It allowed Jarvis and Jani to again close the gap and made it a four-car battle for first place while lapping slower traffic. Bruni battled Mücke for third in LMGTE Pro and had Harry Tincknell in the second Ford close behind him. Bernard caught Fässler, who was held up by one of the Aston Martin cars in the final turn, and temporarily claimed the lead in the first corner before running wide. Bernhard avoided hitting the KCMG car, allowing the No. 7 Audi to retake the position at the turn's exit. Jani attempted to move in front by going around the inside of Jarvis, but after driving back onto the racing line heading into the first turn, locked his tyres. This caused Jani to drive straight, and Mücke's front-end made contact with the Porsche's left-rear corner, causing him to spin onto the run-off area.

In the battle for first Fässler held off another challenge from Bernhard, while Jani rejoined the track in fourth place narrowly ahead of Nakajima in the No. 5 Toyota. The contest for second in LMGTE Pro continued with the top four cars running closely together without any action until Tincknell overtook Bruni around the inside for fourth position at the first corner. The stewards elected not to take any action over the collision between Jani and Mücke at turn one, and Filipe Albuquerque overtook Nicolas Minassian for fifth position in LMP2. The first round of lead car pit stops for car adjustments and driver changes commenced after 50 minutes when both Audi cars made pit stops. After the pit stops, Hartley took over the No. 1 Porsche and gained the lead because both Audi entries were delayed by slower cars. Fuel went onto the hot exhaust of the second-placed No. 66 Ford GT in LMGTE Pro which did not have its breather cap closed, causing a flash fire. Andy Priaulx, who had taken over from Tincknell, exited the car and course officials and the team's crew members were required to extinguish the flames. The fire damaged the car's turbocharger, causing Priaulx to run at a reduced pace.

Lieb reported his car had a vibration while Hartley was warned about track limits. The No. 95 Aston Martin continued to lead LMGTE Pro but the team's No. 98 car required a door change after losing one of its wing mirrors, dropping it to sixth. Joël Camathias in KCMG's Porsche was now running at the front of LMGTE Am ahead of the second-placed No. 83 AF Corse Ferrari. Jarvis closed to eight-tenths of a second behind Hartley until the latter responded by going half a second quicker but later reported his car was loose under braking when entering the track's corners. Hartley lost time through traffic and Jarvis overtook him for the lead at the NGK chicane. Hartley was caught by Lotterer who passed him for second at the first turn. Porsche identified a loss in tyre pressure in Hartley's car and chose to pit him, and Webber climbed aboard the No. 1 car. Lieb made a pit stop from the lead, handing first and second positions to both Toyota cars. Buemi held it for the next few laps until their stops and ceded it to Webber. Pierre Ragues became the LMGTE Am leader after moving in front of François Perrodo and the KCMG Porsche. The first full course yellow was necessitated when Perrodo spun his car into the NGK chicane gravel trap. Marshals cleaned the track at the ninth and twelfth turns.

During the full course yellow, Abu Dhabi-Proton Racing's No. 88 car caught fire but the flames were extinguished and it was able to rejoin the event. The race resumed nine minutes later with Webber leading at the restart. Christian Ried overtook Yutaka Yamagishi for the LMGTE Am lead in the first corner before Mathias Lauda claimed the position on the following lap. Brundle drove slowly with a gearbox problem and made a pit stop from the LMP2 lead before being pushed into his garage to retire, suspected by G-Drive to be caused a dog-ring failure and effected the bevel gears built into the gearbox casing. The overall leaders made pit stops after two hours and 30 minutes which saw the deployment of the second full course yellow when one of the Toyota's dive planes was located in the sixth corner. Racing resumed four minutes later with Jani leading the field, ahead of teammate Bernhard and di Grassi. Jani held a ten-second lead over Bernhard as the race entered its halfway mark and the chance of rain decreased significantly. Webb stopped his car at the outside of the eleventh turn with smoke billowing from his car and retired, prompting the third full course yellow. During the full course yellow, several cars elected to make pit stops for fuel and driver changes.

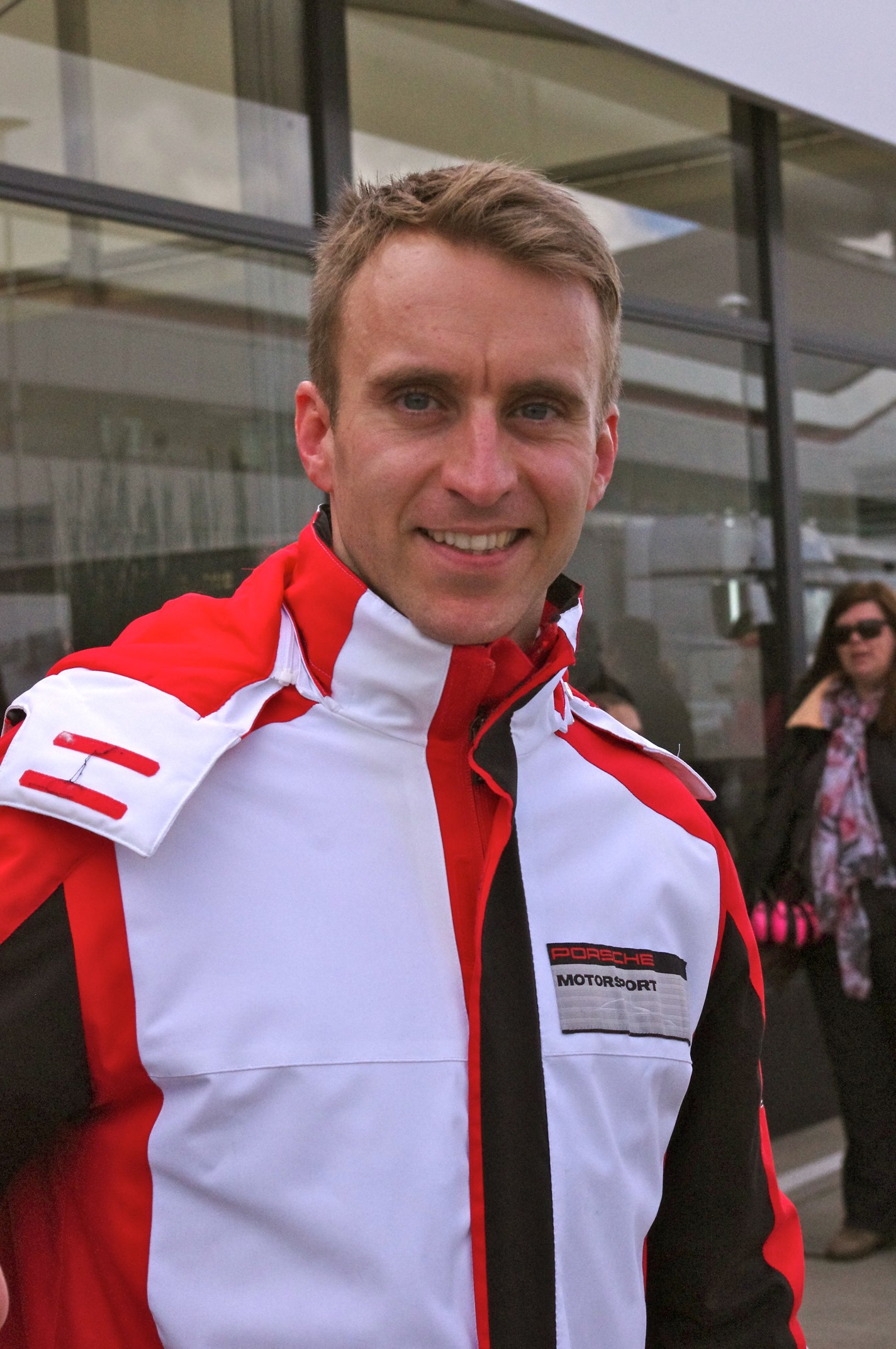
Timo Bernhard (pictured in 2014) secured the No. 1 Porsche's first victory of the season.

Racing resumed seven minutes later with Lieb maintaining the No. 2 Porsche's advantage over teammate Hartley. Thiim was overtaken by Bruni for the LMGTE Pro lead, while Hartley reduced the time deficit to teammate Lieb to 11 seconds. The No. 83 AF Corse Ferrari was issued with a 20-second time penalty after it was observed speeding in the pit lane during the full course yellow. Toyota's No. 6 car was pushed into the garage to repair a loose engine component. Sam Bird, driving the No. 71 AF Corse car, went into the turn five gravel trap but recovered to remain in third place in LMGTE Pro. Pizzonia in Manor's No. 44 vehicle passed Leventis's No. 42 Strakka Racing car for third place in LMP2; the latter fell to fifth after he was overtaken by Derani. A fourth full course yellow was triggered when Lieb attempted to lap Kahled Al-Qubaisi in the LMGTE Am-category No. 88 Abu Dhabi-Proton Racing car but hit him, sending the latter into the turn six gravel trap. Most of the LMP1 and LMP2 runners made pit stops during the full course yellow. Lieb's front-left dive plane was damaged and required repairs, Audi's No. 7 car had its front bodywork changed and the track was cleaned by marshals.

The race resumed 13 minutes later with the No. 1 Porsche driven by Webber leading teammate Jani and Duval. Jani closed the gap to teammate Webber over the next ten minutes. Webber was then instructed by Porsche to allow Jani to move ahead of him because of Jani's faster pace. Jani overtook Webber for the lead at the first corner shortly afterwards. Shortly after, Jani was issued a drive-through penalty for his collision with the No. 88 Abu Dhabi-Proton Racing car and served it four minutes later. He dropped to third overall, behind Duval. Jani was able to catch Duval and attempted to pass him around the outside but the French driver defended his position at the first turn. The two drivers continued to battle, allowing Lotterer to reduce the time distance. Lotterer attempted to overtake Jani around the outside but Jani defended his position, causing Lotterer to run wide and the two made minor contact. Lotterer reduced his speed but caught back up to Jani while moving through slower cars. Jani was overtaken by Lotterer heading into the NGK chicane but the duo drove alongside each other in the final turn and Jani reclaimed second position at turn one. Jani's car was hit at its rear-end by a LMP2-class BR01 car at the chicane as he moved to the inside of the Audi. Lotterer moved into second by passing Jani in the Mercedes Arena section.

The fifth (and final) full course yellow was shown to allow marshals to remove the debris from Jani's car. All cars elected to make pit stops during the full course yellow. Bernhard relieved Webber of his driving duties in the No. 1 Porsche and remained the leader at the restart six minutes later. The No. 2 Porsche was shown a black and orange flag, requiring it to make a pit stop for repairs to its left-rear corner, and reemerged in fourth position. Second-placed LMP2 driver Bruno Senna went into gravel and grass but rejoined without any significant damage. Throughout the remainder of the event, Bernhard kept the overall lead and took the first victory of the season for the No. 1 Porsche, and its first since the 2015 6 Hours of Shanghai. The No. 8 Audi finished in second, ahead of the team's No. 7 car in third. The No. 36 Signatech Alpine car of Menzes, Lapierre, and Richelmi secured the victory in LMP2, and their third consecutive victory of the year, 16 seconds ahead of second-placed No. 43 RGR Sport car. AF Corse's No. 51 Ferrari in LMGTE Pro clinched its first victory of the season, the first of Calado's career and the 13th for Bruni, followed 47 seconds later by teammates Bird and Rigon in second place by teammates. Upon taking the lead from KCMG and holding it for the last 48 laps, Lamy, Lauda and Dalla Lana were untroubled and clinched Aston Martin's second victory in LMGTE Am, ahead of Perrodo, Collard and Agias in the No. 83 AF Corse car. KCMG's No. 78 Porsche initially finished second but was disqualified when it was discovered that the car's minimum ride height was not compliant with the regulations.

=== Post-race ===
The top three finishers of each category appeared on the podium to collect their trophies and in a later press conference. Bernhard said the victory was "especially sweet" because Porsche's success was "hard fought" and it helped reduce the effect of his teammates poor form in the season's first three races. Hartley stated his satisfaction at finishing as the winner and was pleased with his second stint because the circuit came to his car balance wise. Webber spoke of his happiness for Porsche winning their home event, saying "It was an exceptional performance against strong competition", and was content with Porsche's performance. Di Grassi stated: "We can be happy with our second place. We made no mistakes and constantly drove at the limit. When you’re on the front row you’d obviously like to win. But today we were lacking the necessary fortune." Duval said Audi executed "a good performance" in defence but that Porsche were "simply fortunate" in winning the race. Jarvis spoke of his feeling the No. 8 Audi's second place was like "a little victory" and after the team's performance at Le Mans it was to be "an interesting season." Fässler said his team was "pleased" to finish in third but planned to perform more strongly in the next race and Lotterer stated Audi worked well as a team and was looking forward to the 6 Hours of Mexico.

The result meant Lieb, Jani and Dumas maintained their lead in the Drivers' Championship with 106 points, 33 ahead of second-place finishers Duval, di Grassi and Jarvis and a further four in front of Kobayashi, Conway and Sarrazin. Third-place finishers Fässler and Lotterer maintained fourth place on 51 points, and the seventh-place drivers Kraihamer, Imperatori and Tuscher remained in fifth position on 36 points. Porsche remained in the lead of the Manufacturers' Championship on 164 points, 35 in front of their nearest rival Audi in second, and a further 32 ahead of Toyota with five races left in the season.

=== Race results ===
The minimum number of laps for classification (70 per cent of the overall winning car's race distance) was 136 laps. Class winners are denoted in bold.

Final race classification
Pos	Class	No	Team	Drivers	Chassis	Tyre	Laps	Time/Retired
Pos	Class	No	Team	Drivers	Engine	Tyre	Laps	Time/Retired
1	**LMP1**	**1**	**(Germany) Porsche Team**	**(Germany) Timo Bernhard (Australia) Mark Webber (New Zealand) Brendon Hartley**	**Porsche 919 Hybrid**	MI	**194**	**06:01:16.183**
1	**LMP1**	**1**	**(Germany) Porsche Team**	**(Germany) Timo Bernhard (Australia) Mark Webber (New Zealand) Brendon Hartley**	**Porsche 2.0 L Turbo V4**	MI	**194**	**06:01:16.183**
2	LMP1	8	(Germany) Audi Sport Team Joest	(Brazil) Lucas di Grassi (France) Loïc Duval (United Kingdom) Oliver Jarvis	Audi R18	MI	194	+53.787
2	LMP1	8	(Germany) Audi Sport Team Joest	(Brazil) Lucas di Grassi (France) Loïc Duval (United Kingdom) Oliver Jarvis	Audi TDI 4.0 L Turbo Diesel V6	MI	194	+53.787
3	LMP1	7	(Germany) Audi Sport Team Joest	(Switzerland) Marcel Fässler (Germany) André Lotterer	Audi R18	MI	194	+54.483
3	LMP1	7	(Germany) Audi Sport Team Joest	(Switzerland) Marcel Fässler (Germany) André Lotterer	Audi TDI 4.0 L Turbo Diesel V6	MI	194	+54.483
4	LMP1	2	(Germany) Porsche Team	(France) Romain Dumas (Switzerland) Neel Jani (Germany) Marc Lieb	Porsche 919 Hybrid	MI	194	+1:37.324
4	LMP1	2	(Germany) Porsche Team	(France) Romain Dumas (Switzerland) Neel Jani (Germany) Marc Lieb	Porsche 2.0 L Turbo V4	MI	194	+1:37.324
5	LMP1	5	(Japan) Toyota Gazoo Racing	(United Kingdom) Anthony Davidson (Switzerland) Sébastien Buemi (Japan) Kazuki Nakajima	Toyota TS050 Hybrid	MI	193	+1 Lap
5	LMP1	5	(Japan) Toyota Gazoo Racing	(United Kingdom) Anthony Davidson (Switzerland) Sébastien Buemi (Japan) Kazuki Nakajima	Toyota 2.4 L Turbo V6	MI	193	+1 Lap
6	LMP1	6	(Japan) Toyota Gazoo Racing	(France) Stéphane Sarrazin (United Kingdom) Mike Conway (Japan) Kamui Kobayashi	Toyota TS050 Hybrid	MI	190	+4 Laps
6	LMP1	6	(Japan) Toyota Gazoo Racing	(France) Stéphane Sarrazin (United Kingdom) Mike Conway (Japan) Kamui Kobayashi	Toyota 2.4 L Turbo V6	MI	190	+4 Laps
7	LMP1	13	(Switzerland) Rebellion Racing	(Switzerland) Mathéo Tuscher (Austria) Dominik Kraihamer (Switzerland) Alexandre Imperatori	Rebellion R-One	D	178	+16 Laps
7	LMP1	13	(Switzerland) Rebellion Racing	(Switzerland) Mathéo Tuscher (Austria) Dominik Kraihamer (Switzerland) Alexandre Imperatori	AER 2.4 L Turbo V6	D	178	+16 Laps
8	**LMP2**	**36**	**(France) Signatech Alpine**	**(United States) Gustavo Menezes (France) Nicolas Lapierre (Monaco) Stéphane Richelmi**	**Alpine A460**	D	**178**	**+16 Laps**
8	**LMP2**	**36**	**(France) Signatech Alpine**	**(United States) Gustavo Menezes (France) Nicolas Lapierre (Monaco) Stéphane Richelmi**	**Nissan VK45DE 4.5 L V8**	D	**178**	**+16 Laps**
9	LMP2	43	(Mexico) RGR Sport by Morand	(Mexico) Ricardo Gonzalez (Portugal) Filipe Albuquerque (Brazil) Bruno Senna	Ligier JS P2	D	178	+16 Laps
9	LMP2	43	(Mexico) RGR Sport by Morand	(Mexico) Ricardo Gonzalez (Portugal) Filipe Albuquerque (Brazil) Bruno Senna	Nissan VK45DE 4.5 L V8	D	178	+16 Laps
10	LMP2	31	(United States) Extreme Speed Motorsports	(United Kingdom) Ryan Dalziel (Brazil) Pipo Derani (Canada) Chris Cumming	Ligier JS P2	MI	176	+18 Laps
10	LMP2	31	(United States) Extreme Speed Motorsports	(United Kingdom) Ryan Dalziel (Brazil) Pipo Derani (Canada) Chris Cumming	Nissan VK45DE 4.5 L V8	MI	176	+18 Laps
11	LMP2	42	(United Kingdom) Strakka Racing	(United Kingdom) Nick Leventis (United Kingdom) Jonny Kane (United Kingdom) Lewis Williamson	Gibson 015S	D	176	+18 Laps
11	LMP2	42	(United Kingdom) Strakka Racing	(United Kingdom) Nick Leventis (United Kingdom) Jonny Kane (United Kingdom) Lewis Williamson	Nissan VK45DE 4.5 L V8	D	176	+18 Laps
12	LMP2	44	(United Kingdom) Manor	(Thailand) Tor Graves (Brazil) Antônio Pizzonia (United Kingdom) Matthew Howson	Oreca 05	D	176	+18 Laps
12	LMP2	44	(United Kingdom) Manor	(Thailand) Tor Graves (Brazil) Antônio Pizzonia (United Kingdom) Matthew Howson	Nissan VK45DE 4.5 L V8	D	176	+18 Laps
13	LMP2	37	(Russia) SMP Racing	(Russia) Vitaly Petrov (Russia) Kirill Ladygin (Russia) Viktor Shaitar	BR Engineering BR01	D	175	+19 Laps
13	LMP2	37	(Russia) SMP Racing	(Russia) Vitaly Petrov (Russia) Kirill Ladygin (Russia) Viktor Shaitar	Nissan VK45DE 4.5 L V8	D	175	+19 Laps
14	LMP2	35	(China) Baxi DC Racing Alpine	(United States) David Cheng (Netherlands) Ho-Pin Tung (France) Nelson Panciatici	Alpine A460	D	175	+19 Laps
14	LMP2	35	(China) Baxi DC Racing Alpine	(United States) David Cheng (Netherlands) Ho-Pin Tung (France) Nelson Panciatici	Nissan VK45DE 4.5 L V8	D	175	+19 Laps
15	LMP2	27	(Russia) SMP Racing	(France) Nicolas Minassian (Italy) Maurizio Mediani	BR Engineering BR01	D	175	+19 Laps
15	LMP2	27	(Russia) SMP Racing	(France) Nicolas Minassian (Italy) Maurizio Mediani	Nissan VK45DE 4.5 L V8	D	175	+19 Laps
16	LMP2	30	(United States) Extreme Speed Motorsports	(United States) Scott Sharp (United States) Ed Brown (United States) Johannes van Overbeek	Ligier JS P2	MI	172	+22 Laps
16	LMP2	30	(United States) Extreme Speed Motorsports	(United States) Scott Sharp (United States) Ed Brown (United States) Johannes van Overbeek	Nissan VK45DE 4.5 L V8	MI	172	+22 Laps
17	LMP1	12	(Switzerland) Rebellion Racing	(France) Nico Prost (Germany) Nick Heidfeld (Switzerland) Mathias Beche	Rebellion R-One	D	171	+23 Laps
17	LMP1	12	(Switzerland) Rebellion Racing	(France) Nico Prost (Germany) Nick Heidfeld (Switzerland) Mathias Beche	AER P60 2.4 L Turbo V6	D	171	+23 Laps
18	**LMGTE; Pro**	**51**	**(Italy) AF Corse**	**(Italy) Gianmaria Bruni (United Kingdom) James Calado**	**Ferrari 488 GTE**	MI	**170**	**+24 Laps**
18	**LMGTE; Pro**	**51**	**(Italy) AF Corse**	**(Italy) Gianmaria Bruni (United Kingdom) James Calado**	**Ferrari F154CB 3.9 L Turbo V8**	MI	**170**	**+24 Laps**
19	LMGTE; Pro	71	(Italy) AF Corse	(Italy) Davide Rigon (United Kingdom) Sam Bird	Ferrari 488 GTE	MI	170	+24 Laps
19	LMGTE; Pro	71	(Italy) AF Corse	(Italy) Davide Rigon (United Kingdom) Sam Bird	Ferrari F154CB 3.9 L Turbo V8	MI	170	+24 Laps
20	LMGTE; Pro	95	(United Kingdom) Aston Martin Racing	(Denmark) Nicki Thiim (Denmark) Marco Sørensen	Aston Martin Vantage GTE	D	170	+24 Laps
20	LMGTE; Pro	95	(United Kingdom) Aston Martin Racing	(Denmark) Nicki Thiim (Denmark) Marco Sørensen	Aston Martin 4.5 L V8	D	170	+24 Laps
21	LMGTE; Pro	66	(United States) Ford Chip Ganassi Team UK	(Germany) Stefan Mücke (France) Olivier Pla	Ford GT	MI	169	+25 Laps
21	LMGTE; Pro	66	(United States) Ford Chip Ganassi Team UK	(Germany) Stefan Mücke (France) Olivier Pla	Ford EcoBoost 3.5 L Turbo V6	MI	169	+25 Laps
22	LMGTE; Pro	97	(United Kingdom) Aston Martin Racing	(New Zealand) Richie Stanaway (United Kingdom) Darren Turner	Aston Martin Vantage GTE	D	169	+25 Laps
22	LMGTE; Pro	97	(United Kingdom) Aston Martin Racing	(New Zealand) Richie Stanaway (United Kingdom) Darren Turner	Aston Martin 4.5 L V8	D	169	+25 Laps
23	LMGTE; Pro	77	(Germany) Dempsey-Proton Racing	(Austria) Richard Lietz (Denmark) Michael Christensen	Porsche 911 RSR	MI	169	+25 Laps
23	LMGTE; Pro	77	(Germany) Dempsey-Proton Racing	(Austria) Richard Lietz (Denmark) Michael Christensen	Porsche 4.0 L Flat-6	MI	169	+25 Laps
24	**LMGTE; Am**	**98**	**(United Kingdom) Aston Martin Racing**	**(Canada) Paul Dalla Lana (Portugal) Pedro Lamy (Austria) Mathias Lauda**	**Aston Martin Vantage GTE**	D	**166**	**+28 Laps**
24	**LMGTE; Am**	**98**	**(United Kingdom) Aston Martin Racing**	**(Canada) Paul Dalla Lana (Portugal) Pedro Lamy (Austria) Mathias Lauda**	**Aston Martin 4.5 L V8**	D	**166**	**+28 Laps**
25	LMGTE; Am	83	(Italy) AF Corse	(France) François Perrodo (France) Emmanuel Collard (Portugal) Rui Águas	Ferrari 458 Italia GT2	MI	166	+28 Laps
25	LMGTE; Am	83	(Italy) AF Corse	(France) François Perrodo (France) Emmanuel Collard (Portugal) Rui Águas	Ferrari 4.5 L V8	MI	166	+28 Laps
26	LMGTE; Am	50	(France) Larbre Compétition	(Japan) Yutaka Yamagishi (France) Pierre Ragues (Italy) Paolo Ruberti	Chevrolet Corvette C7.R	MI	165	+29 Laps
26	LMGTE; Am	50	(France) Larbre Compétition	(Japan) Yutaka Yamagishi (France) Pierre Ragues (Italy) Paolo Ruberti	Chevrolet LT5.5 5.5 L V8	MI	165	+29 Laps
27	LMGTE; Am	88	(United Arab Emirates) Abu Dhabi-Proton Racing	(United Arab Emirates) Khaled Al Qubaisi (Denmark) David Heinemeier Hansson (United States) Patrick Long	Porsche 911 RSR	MI	164	+30 Laps
27	LMGTE; Am	88	(United Arab Emirates) Abu Dhabi-Proton Racing	(United Arab Emirates) Khaled Al Qubaisi (Denmark) David Heinemeier Hansson (United States) Patrick Long	Porsche 4.0 L Flat-6	MI	164	+30 Laps
28	LMGTE; Am	86	(United Kingdom) Gulf Racing	(United Kingdom) Michael Wainwright (United Kingdom) Adam Carroll (United Kingdom) Ben Barker	Porsche 911 RSR	MI	164	+30 Laps
28	LMGTE; Am	86	(United Kingdom) Gulf Racing	(United Kingdom) Michael Wainwright (United Kingdom) Adam Carroll (United Kingdom) Ben Barker	Porsche 4.0 L Flat-6	MI	164	+30 Laps
29	LMGTE; Pro	67	(United States) Ford Chip Ganassi Team UK	(United Kingdom) Marino Franchitti (United Kingdom) Andy Priaulx (United Kingdom) Harry Tincknell	Ford GT	MI	155	+39 Laps
29	LMGTE; Pro	67	(United States) Ford Chip Ganassi Team UK	(United Kingdom) Marino Franchitti (United Kingdom) Andy Priaulx (United Kingdom) Harry Tincknell	Ford EcoBoost 3.5 L Turbo V6	MI	155	+39 Laps
DNF	LMP2	45	(United Kingdom) Manor	(United Kingdom) Matt Rao (United Kingdom) Richard Bradley (Spain) Roberto Merhi	Oreca 05	D	149	Brakes
DNF	LMP2	45	(United Kingdom) Manor	(United Kingdom) Matt Rao (United Kingdom) Richard Bradley (Spain) Roberto Merhi	Nissan VK45DE 4.5 L V8	D	149	Brakes
DNF	LMP1	4	(Austria) ByKolles Racing Team	(Switzerland) Simon Trummer (United Kingdom) Oliver Webb (Germany) Pierre Kaffer	CLM P1/01	D	98	Engine
DNF	LMP1	4	(Austria) ByKolles Racing Team	(Switzerland) Simon Trummer (United Kingdom) Oliver Webb (Germany) Pierre Kaffer	AER P60 2.4 L Turbo V6	D	98	Engine
DNF	LMP2	26	(Russia) G-Drive Racing	(Russia) Roman Rusinov (Germany) René Rast (United Kingdom) Alex Brundle	Oreca 05	D	74	Gearbox
DNF	LMP2	26	(Russia) G-Drive Racing	(Russia) Roman Rusinov (Germany) René Rast (United Kingdom) Alex Brundle	Nissan VK45DE 4.5 L V8	D	74	Gearbox
EX	LMGTE; Am	78	(Hong Kong) KCMG	(Germany) Christian Ried (Germany) Wolf Henzler (Switzerland) Joël Camathias	Porsche 911 RSR	MI	166	Disqualified (Note: The No. 78 KCMG Porsche which originally finished second in the LMGTE Am class was excluded after the race by the stewards for failing to pass the post-race ride-height check.)
EX	LMGTE; Am	78	(Hong Kong) KCMG	(Germany) Christian Ried (Germany) Wolf Henzler (Switzerland) Joël Camathias	Porsche 4.0 L Flat-6	MI	166	Disqualified

Tyre manufacturers
Key
Symbol	Tyre manufacturer
**D**	Dunlop
**MI**	Michelin

== Standings after the race ==
World Endurance Drivers' Championship standings
Pos.	+/–	Driver	Points
1		(Germany) Marc Lieb (France) Romain Dumas (Switzerland) Neel Jani	106
2		(France) Loïc Duval (Brazil) Lucas di Grassi (United Kingdom) Oliver Jarvis	73
3		(France) Stéphane Sarrazin (United Kingdom) Mike Conway (Japan) Kamui Kobayashi	62
4		(Germany) André Lotterer (Switzerland) Marcel Fässler	51
5		(Austria) Dominik Kraihamer (Switzerland) Alexandre Imperatori (Switzerland) Mathéo Tuscher	36

World Endurance Manufacturers' Championship standings
Pos.	+/–	Constructor	Points
1		(Germany) Porsche	164
2		(Japan) Toyota	129
3		(Germany) Audi	97

- Note: Only the top five positions are included for the Drivers' Championship standings.

== Notes ==
FIA World Endurance Championship
Previous race: 24 Hours of Le Mans	2016 season	Next race: 6 Hours of Mexico
