= 2005 Formula BMW UK season =

Seasons
- ← 2004 2006 →

The 2005 Formula BMW UK season was the second of four Formula BMW seasons based in United Kingdom for young drivers making the transition to car racing. The series supported every BTCC round apart from round three at Rockingham where it was part of a Kumho BMW and Miltek BMW event. Dean Smith won the championship at his second attempt with new team Nexa Racing after scoring in every round, his championship rival Sam Bird won six races but lost a lot of points with five DNFs during the season.

== Teams and drivers ==
All cars were Mygale FB02 chassis powered by BMW engines. Guest drivers in italics.

| Team | No | Driver | Class | Rounds |
|---|---|---|---|---|
| (United Kingdom) Carlin Motorsport | 1 | (United Kingdom) Simon Walker-Hansell | | All |
| (United Kingdom) Carlin Motorsport | 2 | (Portugal) Duarte Félix da Costa | | All |
| (United Kingdom) Fortec Motorsport | 4 | (Norway) Stian Sørlie | | All |
| (United Kingdom) Fortec Motorsport | 5 | (United Kingdom) Sam Bird | | All |
| (United Kingdom) Fortec Motorsport | 6 | (United Kingdom) Chris Holmes | | 1–2, 4–10 |
| (United Kingdom) Master Motorsport | 7 | (United Kingdom) Michael Meadows | R | All |
| (United Kingdom) Promatecme/Soper Sport | 8 | (United Kingdom) Ross Curnow | | All |
| (United Kingdom) Nexa Racing | 9 | (United Kingdom) Joe Osborne | R | All |
| (United Kingdom) Nexa Racing | 10 | (United Kingdom) Dean Smith | | All |
| (United Kingdom) Nexa Racing | 77 | (United Kingdom) Jordan Wise | | All |
| (United Kingdom) Motaworld Racing | 13 | (United Kingdom) James Wingfield | | 6–8, 10 |
| (United Kingdom) Motaworld Racing | 27 | (France) Dominique Cauvin | R | 2–5, 8–10 |
| (United Kingdom) Motaworld Racing | 28 | (Australia) Nathan Antunes | | All |
| (Republic of Ireland) Filcell Motorsport | 14 | (United Kingdom) Matt Howson | | All |
| (Republic of Ireland) Filcell Motorsport | 15 | (United Kingdom) Callum MacLeod | | 1–7 |
| (United Kingdom) Pegasus Motorsport Intl Ltd | 11 | (United Kingdom) Jack Goldstraw | | 4–5, 8 |
| (United Kingdom) Pegasus Motorsport Intl Ltd | 16 | (United Kingdom) Jonathan Legris | R | 1–5 |
| (United Kingdom) Formula Racing Ltd | 16 | (United Kingdom) Jonathan Legris | R | 6–7 |
| (United Kingdom) Mark Burdett Motorsport | 16 | (United Kingdom) Jonathan Legris | R | 8–10 |
| (United Kingdom) Pegasus Motorsport Intl Ltd | 18 | (United Kingdom) Ry Leon | | 1 |
| (United Kingdom) Mark Burdett Motorsport | 12 | (United Kingdom) Edward Hoy | R | 1–5 |
| (United Kingdom) Mark Burdett Motorsport | 19 | (United Kingdom) Aaron Steele | R | All |
| (United Kingdom) Mark Burdett Motorsport | 20 | (United Kingdom) Phil Glew | | 6–8 |
| (United Kingdom) Barwell Motorsport | 17 | (Republic of Ireland) Niall Breen | | All |
| (United Kingdom) Barwell Motorsport | 18 | (United Kingdom) Euan Hankey | R | All |
| (United Kingdom) Team SWR Pioneer/Loctite | 41 | (United Kingdom) Matt Harris | | All |
| (United Kingdom) Team SWR Pioneer/Loctite | 42 | (United Kingdom) Lars Viljoen | | All |
| (United Kingdom) Team SWR Pioneer/Loctite | 43 | (United Kingdom) Paul Rees | | 1–7 |
| (United Kingdom) Team SWR Pioneer/Loctite | 44 | (United Kingdom) Richard Keen | | 1–2 |
| (United Kingdom) Team SWR Pioneer/Loctite | 44 | (United Kingdom) Oliver Turvey | | 3–10 |

| Icon | Class |
|---|---|
| R | Rookie Cup |

== Results and standings ==
=== Calendar ===
| Round | Circuit | Date | Pole position | Fastest lap | Winning driver | Winning team |
|---|---|---|---|---|---|---|
| 1 | Donington Park (National) | 10 April | (Australia) Nathan Antunes | (Norway) Stian Sørlie | (United Kingdom) Matt Howson | (Republic of Ireland) Filcell Motorsport |
| 2 | Donington Park (National) | 10 April | (Australia) Nathan Antunes | (United Kingdom) Dean Smith | (Australia) Nathan Antunes | (United Kingdom) Motaworld Racing |
| 3 | Thruxton | 1 May | (United Kingdom) Sam Bird | (United Kingdom) Euan Hankey | (Norway) Stian Sørlie | (United Kingdom) Fortec Motorsport |
| 4 | Thruxton | 1 May | (United Kingdom) Sam Bird | (United Kingdom) Sam Bird | (Norway) Stian Sørlie | (United Kingdom) Fortec Motorsport |
| 5 | Rockingham (International Super Sports Car Long) | 22 May | (United Kingdom) Simon Walker-Hansell | (United Kingdom) Matt Howson | (United Kingdom) Simon Walker-Hansell | (United Kingdom) Carlin Motorsport |
| 6 | Rockingham (International Super Sports Car Long) | 22 May | (United Kingdom) Matt Howson | (United Kingdom) Matt Howson | (United Kingdom) Matt Howson | (Republic of Ireland) Filcell Motorsport |
| 7 | Brands Hatch (Indy) | 5 June | (United Kingdom) Matt Howson | (United Kingdom) Oliver Turvey | (United Kingdom) Matt Howson | (Republic of Ireland) Filcell Motorsport |
| 8 | Brands Hatch (Indy) | 5 June | (United Kingdom) Sam Bird | (United Kingdom) Jordan Wise | (United Kingdom) Sam Bird | (United Kingdom) Fortec Motorsport |
| 9 | Oulton Park (Island) | 18 June | (United Kingdom) Sam Bird | (United Kingdom) Jonathan Legris | (United Kingdom) Sam Bird | (United Kingdom) Fortec Motorsport |
| 10 | Oulton Park (Island) | 19 June | (United Kingdom) Sam Bird | (United Kingdom) Jordan Wise | (United Kingdom) Sam Bird | (United Kingdom) Fortec Motorsport |
| 11 | Croft | 16 July | (United Kingdom) Sam Bird | (United Kingdom) Sam Bird | (United Kingdom) Sam Bird | (United Kingdom) Fortec Motorsport |
| 12 | Croft | 17 July | (United Kingdom) Sam Bird | (United Kingdom) Sam Bird | (United Kingdom) Sam Bird | (United Kingdom) Fortec Motorsport |
| 13 | Mondello Park | 24 July | (United Kingdom) Dean Smith | (United Kingdom) Dean Smith | (United Kingdom) Dean Smith | (United Kingdom) Nexa Racing |
| 14 | Mondello Park | 24 July | (United Kingdom) Sam Bird | (United Kingdom) Matt Harris | (United Kingdom) Matt Harris | (United Kingdom) Carlin Motorsport |
| 15 | Knockhill | 28 August | (United Kingdom) Dean Smith | (United Kingdom) Dean Smith | (United Kingdom) Dean Smith | (United Kingdom) Nexa Racing |
| 16 | Knockhill | 28 August | (United Kingdom) Oliver Turvey | (United Kingdom) Matt Howson | (United Kingdom) Ross Curnow | (United Kingdom) Fortec Motorsport |
| 17 | Silverstone (National) | 17 September | (Norway) Stian Sørlie | (Norway) Stian Sørlie | (United Kingdom) Sam Bird | (United Kingdom) Fortec Motorsport |
| 18 | Silverstone (National) | 18 September | (Norway) Stian Sørlie | (United Kingdom) Jordan Wise | (Norway) Stian Sørlie | (United Kingdom) Fortec Motorsport |
| 19 | Brands Hatch (Grand Prix) | 2 October | (United Kingdom) Matt Howson | (United Kingdom) Dean Smith | (United Kingdom) Matt Howson | (Republic of Ireland) Filcell Motorsport |
| 20 | Brands Hatch (Grand Prix) | 2 October | (Australia) Nathan Antunes | (United Kingdom) Oliver Turvey | (United Kingdom) Dean Smith | (United Kingdom) Nexa Racing |

=== Drivers Championship ===
| Pos | Driver | DON | | THR | | ROC | | BRH | | OUL | | CRO | | MON | | KNO | | SIL | | BRH | | Pts |
|---|---|---|---|---|---|---|---|---|---|---|---|---|---|---|---|---|---|---|---|---|---|---|
| 1 | (United Kingdom) Dean Smith | 6 | 6 | 3 | 7 | 6 | 8 | 5 | 4 | 2 | 5 | 3 | 5 | 1 | 4 | 1 | 7 | 2 | 3 | 2 | 1 | 221 |
| 2 | (United Kingdom) Sam Bird | 4 | 3 | 2 | 2 | Ret | Ret | 2 | 1 | 1 | 1 | 1 | 1 | 7 | 6 | 10 | Ret | 1 | Ret | Ret | 2 | 218 |
| 3 | (United Kingdom) Matt Howson | 1 | 4 | 11 | Ret | 2 | 1 | 1 | 6 | 12 | 22 | 14 | 7 | 3 | 9 | 3 | 2 | 3 | 2 | 1 | 15 | 189 |
| 4 | (Norway) Stian Sørlie | 3 | Ret | 1 | 1 | 4 | Ret | 8 | 5 | 4 | 2 | 4 | 8 | 18 | 11 | 13 | 5 | 4 | 1 | Ret | Ret | 153 |
| 5 | (United Kingdom) Ross Curnow | 2 | 5 | 7 | 6 | 7 | 11 | 4 | 3 | NC | 12 | 9 | 9 | Ret | 5 | 4 | 1 | 13 | 14 | 4 | 4 | 127 |
| 6 | (United Kingdom) Simon Walker-Hansell | Ret | 9 | 9 | 9 | 1 | 2 | 6 | 8 | 3 | 8 | 6 | 6 | 5 | 14 | 7 | 4 | 10 | 7 | Ret | 5 | 118 |
| 7 | (Australia) Nathan Antunes | Ret | 1 | 6 | 3 | 3 | 5 | 9 | 11 | 7 | 7 | Ret | Ret | 17 | 20 | 5 | 3 | 5 | 8 | Ret | 7 | 105 |
| 8 | (United Kingdom) Oliver Turvey | | | | | 5 | Ret | 3 | 7 | 9 | 3 | Ret | 3 | 2 | 2 | 19 | 9 | 6 | 19 | 3 | 16 | 103 |
| 9 | (United Kingdom) Jordan Wise | 12 | 11 | 8 | 5 | 9 | Ret | 7 | 2 | 6 | 20 | 8 | Ret | Ret | 7 | 6 | 12 | 8 | 4 | 7 | 6 | 79 |
| 10 | (Portugal) Duarte Félix da Costa | Ret | Ret | 5 | 8 | Ret | 4 | 14 | 10 | 15 | 4 | 7 | 4 | 8 | 10 | Ret | 11 | 9 | 6 | Ret | 17 | 64 |
| 11 | (Republic of Ireland) Niall Breen | 17 | 12 | 19 | 19 | 10 | 3 | 20 | 13 | 8 | Ret | Ret | Ret | 13 | 17 | 16 | 6 | 7 | 5 | 8 | 3 | 49 |
| 12 | (United Kingdom) Euan Hankey | 10 | 8 | 4 | Ret | 8 | 9 | 10 | 14 | Ret | 6 | 15 | Ret | 4 | 13 | 17 | 10 | 14 | 18 | 11 | 10 | 38 |
| 13 | (United Kingdom) Richard Keen | 5 | 2 | Ret | 4 | | | | | | | | | | | | | | | | | 33 |
| 14 | (United Kingdom) Michael Meadows | 7 | 15 | 10 | 11 | 14 | 15 | Ret | 16 | 5 | 13 | 5 | Ret | Ret | 21 | 8 | Ret | 18 | 11 | 9 | 8 | 32 |
| 15 | (United Kingdom) Matt Harris | Ret | 7 | 12 | 12 | 12 | 10 | 12 | 18 | Ret | 15 | 13 | 11 | 9 | 1 | 14 | 15 | 16 | 16 | 13 | Ret | 29 |
| 16 | (United Kingdom) Jonathan Legris | Ret | Ret | 20 | 18 | 11 | 6 | 11 | 15 | 19 | 9 | 10 | 10 | Ret | 18 | 12 | Ret | 11 | 9 | 5 | 12 | 22 |
| 17 | (United Kingdom) Chris Holmes | Ret | 14 | DNS | DNS | | | Ret | Ret | 11 | 11 | Ret | DNS | 11 | 19 | 18 | 13 | Ret | 13 | 6 | 9 | 9 |
| 18 | (United Kingdom) Lars Viljoen | 9 | 13 | 14 | 13 | 19 | 7 | 13 | 19 | 13 | 19 | 17 | 16 | Ret | 15 | 15 | 18 | 15 | 17 | Ret | 14 | 6 |
| = | (France) Dominique Cauvin | | | 18 | 15 | 16 | 13 | Ret | 9 | 14 | 18 | | | | | 9 | 14 | 12 | 10 | 12 | Ret | 6 |
| 20 | (United Kingdom) Joe Osborne | 15 | Ret | 13 | Ret | 17 | 14 | 18 | 21 | 17 | 17 | 11 | 12 | 16 | Ret | 11 | 8 | 17 | 12 | Ret | 11 | 5 |
| 21 | (United Kingdom) Aaron Steele | 13 | 16 | 15 | 17 | 18 | Ret | 16 | Ret | 18 | 14 | Ret | DNS | 12 | 8 | Ret | 16 | Ret | 15 | DNS | DNS | 4 |
| 22 | (United Kingdom) Ry Leon | 8 | Ret | | | | | | | | | | | | | | | | | | | 3 |
| 23 | (United Kingdom) Paul Rees | 16 | Ret | 16 | 14 | Ret | Ret | 19 | 20 | 16 | 16 | Ret | 13 | 10 | 16 | | | | | | | 2 |
| = | (United Kingdom) Callum MacLeod | 11 | 10 | Ret | 10 | 13 | 12 | 15 | 12 | Ret | 21 | 12 | 14 | 15 | Ret | | | | | | | 2 |
| = | (United Kingdom) Jack Goldstraw | | | | | | | 17 | 17 | 10 | 10 | | | | | Ret | 17 | | | | | 2 |
| 26 | (United Kingdom) James Wingfield | | | | | | | | | | | 16 | 15 | 14 | 12 | Ret | Ret | | | 10 | 13 | 1 |
| | (United Kingdom) Edward Hoy | 14 | Ret | 17 | 16 | 15 | Ret | Ret | Ret | Ret | Ret | | | | | | | | | | | 0 |
Guest drivers ineligible for championship points
| | (United Kingdom) Phil Glew | | | | | | | | | | | 2 | 2 | 6 | 3 | 2 | Ret | | | | | 0 |
| Pos | Driver | DON | | THR | | ROC | | BRH | | OUL | | CRO | | MON | | KNO | | SIL | | BRH | | Pts |

== Sources ==
- tsl-timing.com
- https://www.driverdb.com/championships/standings/formula-bmw-uk/2005/ driverdb.com
