= Duarte Félix da Costa =

Portuguese racing driver

- Nationality: (Portugal) Portuguese
- Born: Duarte Maria de Ortigão Ramos Félix da Costa; 31 May 1985 (age 41) Cascais, Portugal
- Relatives: António Félix da Costa (half-brother)
- Categorisation: FIA Silver (until 2015); FIA Bronze (2016–)

Previous series
- 2012 2011 2009, 2018 2009 2008-09 2008 2008, 2010 2007-10 2006 2006 2004-05: American Le Mans Series; Blancpain Endurance Series; International GT Open; European Touring Car Cup; Portuguese Touring Car Championship; World Touring Car Championship; SEAT León Eurocup; SEAT León Supercopa; Formula Renault 2.0 NEC; Eurocup Formula Renault 2.0; Formula BMW UK

Duarte Maria de Ortigão Ramos Félix da Costa (born May 31, 1985 in Cascais) is a Portuguese auto racing driver and driving coach. He has spent the majority of his motorsport career participating in touring car racing, and would also take part in sports car racing later on in his career.

== Career history ==
Félix da Costa began his career in karting and moved into racing cars in 2004 when he competed in the Formula BMW UK championship, where he raced for two years for Carlin Motorsport, finishing 13th and tenth in the championship standings. He moved to Formula Renault in 2006, competing in the Formula Renault 2.0 Northern European Cup (which his brother Antonio won in 2009) and the Eurocup Formula Renault 2.0.

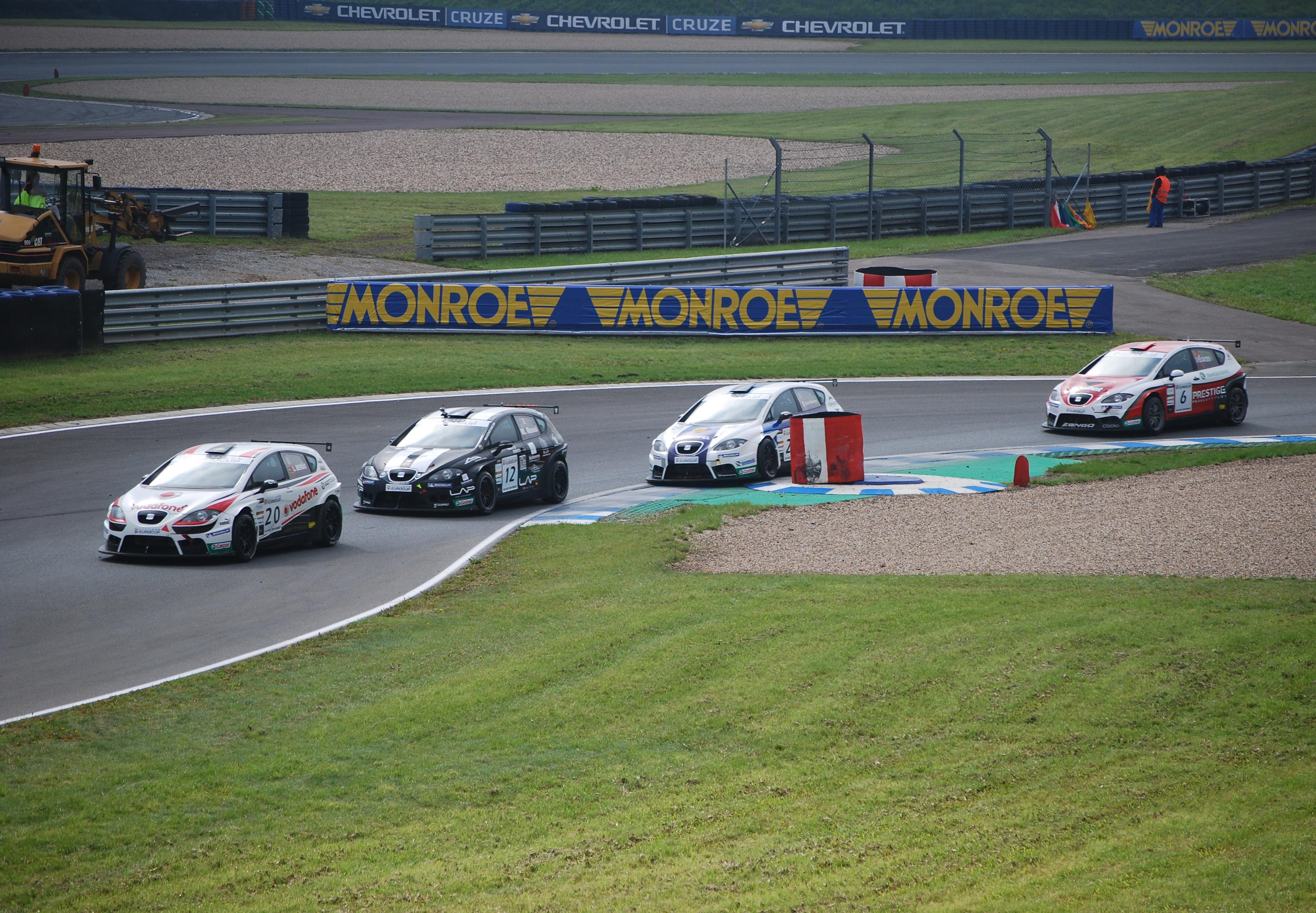
Félix da Costa formerly raced in the SEAT León Supercopa from 2007 to 2010.

Having failed to win a race in single-seaters for three years, Félix da Costa moved to touring cars, racing in the SEAT León Supercopa one-make series in 2007, finishing ninth. He would also race in the SEAT León Eurocup in 2008, also finishing the season in ninth. That same year, Félix da Costa earned a one-off guest drive in the World Touring Car Championship with Sunred Engineering after displaying strong performances at Oschersleben in the SEAT León Eurocup. He would return to the SEAT León Eurocup in 2010, finishing the season in sixth.

In 2009, Félix da Costa competed in the Portuguese Touring Car Championship and would post a strong campaign, finishing the year in second with three victories. He would also venture into sports car racing for the first time in his career, racing in the International GT Open with Escudería Roger Racing alongside Miquel Julià in a Ferrari F430 GT3. Félix da Costa also competed in the European Touring Car Cup at Braga for British Touring Car Championship team Bamboo Engineering in a Chevrolet Lacetti alongside Harry Vaulkhard. He and Vaulkhard locked out the second row of the grid during qualifying, and Félix da Costa would finish in eighth and seventh for both races.

Félix da Costa competed in the Blancpain Endurance Series for 2011 with Leipert Motorsport, driving a Lamborghini Gallardo LP600 GT3 alongside fellow countrymen Lourenço da Veiga and Ricardo Bravo. The trio completed the season third in the GT3 Pro-Am class. He would also take part in the 2012 American Le Mans Monterey race at Laguna Seca the following year, finishing 31st in LMP2.

Since 2013, Félix da Costa has dedicated his time to coaching young drivers. He co-founded Synergy Driver Performance with Rodrigo Loyo in 2015 to elevate young drivers through their careers as they go through the categories of junior formula and sports car racing.

In 2018, Félix da Costa returned to the International GT Open at the Monza round, racing with Drivex School in a Mercedes-AMG GT3 alongside Ricardo Baptista.

== Personal life ==
Félix da Costa's younger half-brother António is also a racing driver best known for competing in Formula E, also to whom Duarte serves as manager.

Félix da Costa is married to psychologist Carlota Rocha.

== Racing record ==
=== Career summary ===
Season	Series	Team	Races	Wins	Poles	F/Laps	Podiums	Points	Position
2004	Formula BMW UK Championship	Carlin M/sport - Team Portugal	18	0	0	0	0	31	13th
2005	Formula BMW UK Championship	Carlin Motorsport	20	0	0	0	1	64	10th
2005	Formula BMW UK Winter Series	Motaworld Racing	2	0	0	0	0	15	18th
2006	Eurocup Formula Renault 2.0	AR Motorsport	8	0	0	0	0	0	32nd
2006	Eurocup Formula Renault 2.0	Koiranen Bros Motorsport	2	0	0	0	0	0	32nd
2006	Formula Renault 2.0 NEC	AR Motorsport	15	0	1	1	0	140	12th
2007	SEAT León Supercopa	Bastos Sport	15	0	1	0	1	45	9th
2008	SEAT León Supercopa	Bastos Sport	3	0	0	0	0	5	25th
2008	SEAT León Eurocup	Bastos Sport	10	0	0	0	2	31	9th
2008	FIA World Touring Car Championship	SUNRED Engineering	2	0	0	0	0	0	NC
2008	FIA World Touring Car Championship – Yokohama Independents' Trophy	SUNRED Engineering	2	0	0	0	0	2	24th
2009	Portuguese Touring Car Championship	Bastos Sport	16	3	1	1	8	81	**2nd**
2009	International GT Open	Escudería Roger Racing	4	0	0	0	0	10	36th
2009	European Touring Car Cup	Bamboo Engineering	2	0	0	0	0	3	9th
2010	SEAT León Eurocup	Zengő Motorsport	12	0	0	0	3	28.5	6th
2010	SEAT León Supercopa	Zengő Motorsport	3	0	0	0	0	1	29th
2011	Blancpain Endurance Series – GT3 Pro-Am Cup	Team Rhino's Leipert	5	0	0	0	2	55	**3rd**
2012	2012 American Le Mans Series – LMP2	Project Libra	1	0	0	0	0	0	NC
2018	International GT Open	Drivex School	2	0	0	0	0	7	13th

=== Complete Eurocup Formula Renault 2.0 results ===
(key) (Races in bold indicate pole position; races in italics indicate fastest lap)

Year	Entrant	1	2	3	4	5	6	7	8	9	10	11	12	13	14	DC	Points
2006	AR Motorsport	ZOL; 1 Ret	ZOL; 2; 19	IST; 1; 20	IST; 2; 17	MIS; 1	MIS; 2	NÜR; 1 Ret	NÜR; 2; 19	DON; 1; 13	DON; 2 Ret	LMS; 1	LMS; 2			32nd	0
2006	Koiranen Bros. Motorsport													CAT; 1; 15	CAT; 2; 18	32nd	0

=== Complete Formula Renault 2.0 NEC results ===
(key) (Races in bold indicate pole position) (Races in italics indicate fastest lap)

Year	Entrant	1	2	3	4	5	6	7	8	9	10	11	12	13	14	15	16	DC	Points
2006	AR Motorsport	OSC; 1; 10	OSC; 2; 12	SPA; 1; 11	SPA; 2 DNS	NÜR; 1; 7	NÜR; 2; 9	ZAN; 1; 13	ZAN; 2; 9	OSC; 1; 11	OSC; 2; 7	ASS; 1 Ret	ASS; 2; 5	AND; 1; 10	**AND**; **2** Ret	SAL; 1 Ret	SAL; 2; 8	12th	140

=== Complete World Touring Car Championship results ===
(key) (Races in bold indicate pole position) (Races in italics indicate fastest lap)

Year	Team	Car	1	2	3	4	5	6	7	8	9	10	11	12	13	14	15	16	17	18	19	20	21	22	23	24	DC	Points
2008	SUNRED Engineering	SEAT León TFSI	BRA; 1	BRA; 2	MEX; 1	MEX; 2	ESP; 1	ESP; 2	FRA; 1	FRA; 2	CZE; 1	CZE; 2	POR; 1	POR; 2	GBR; 1	GBR; 2	GER; 1	GER; 2	EUR; 1	EUR; 2	ITA; 1 Ret	ITA; 2; 20	JPN; 1	JPN; 2	MAC; 1	MAC; 2	NC	0
