= Marco Holzer =

German professional racing driver

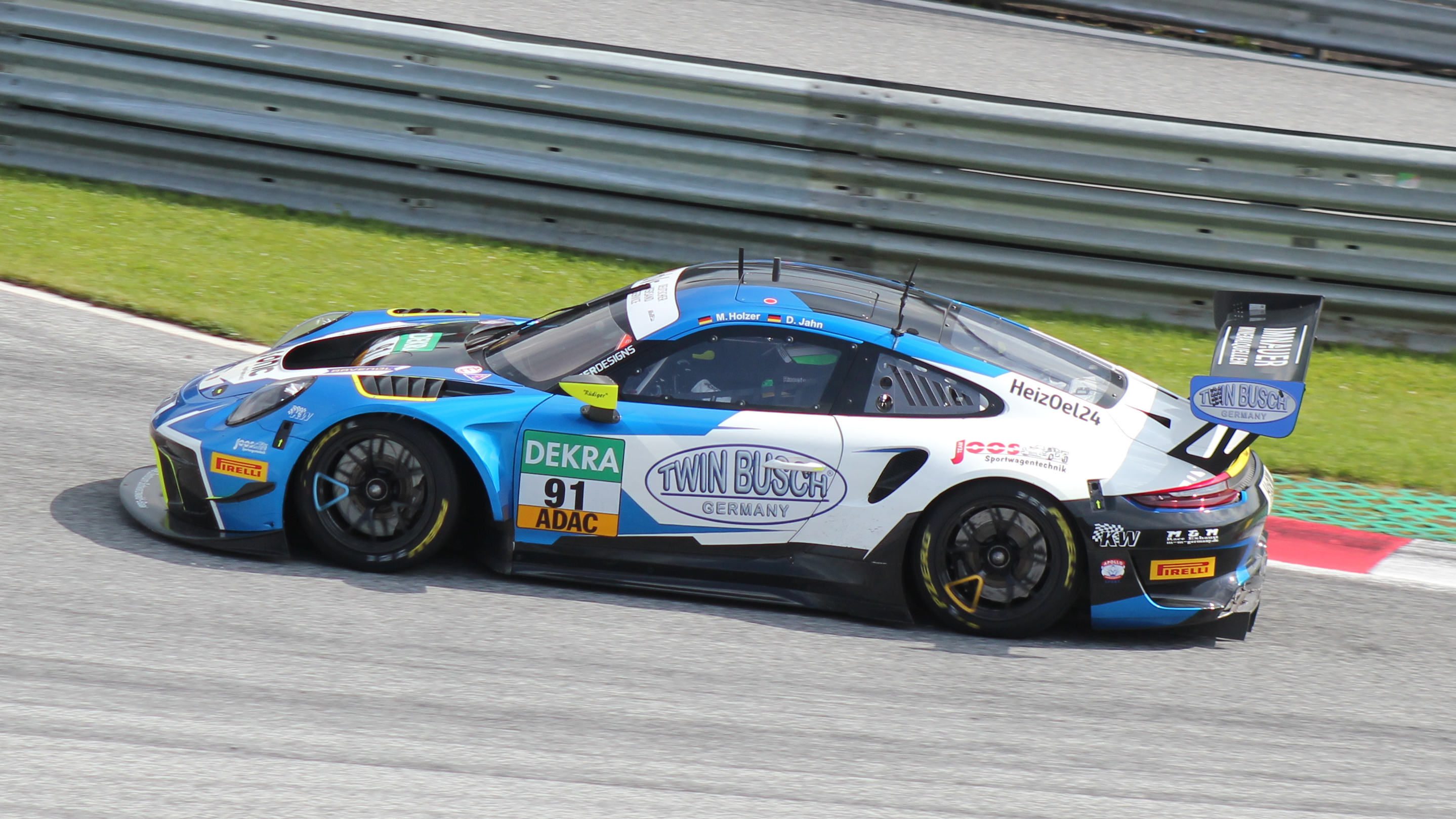
- Nationality: German
- Born: Marco Pascal Holzer; 30 July 1988 (age 38) Bobingen, Germany

FIA GT3 European Championship career
- Current team: Paul Miller Racing
- Categorisation: FIA Gold (until 2012, 2019–); FIA Platinum (2013–2018)
- Car number: 48
24 Hours of Le Mans career
- Years: 2010 –
- Teams: BMS Scuderia Italia; Prospeed Competition
- Best finish: 14th (2010)
- Class wins: 0

Marco Pascal Holzer (born 30 July 1988) is a German professional racing driver. He has competed in sports car competitions such as the 24 Hours of Le Mans, 24 Hours of Daytona, American Le Mans Series and Le Mans Series as a Porsche works driver.

== Career ==
Born in Bobingen, Bavaria, Holzer graduated from karting in 2003, and raced at the Formula BMW ADAC formula championship from 2004 to 2006. In 2006, he competed at the Formula 3 Euro Series, where he scored no points.

In 2008, Holzer switched to sports car racing, finishing fifth at the Porsche Carrera Cup Germany. He signed as Porsche junior works driver, and raced at the 2009 FIA GT Championship for Prospeed and VLN for Manthey, in both cases driving a Porsche 911.

Holzer became a Porsche works driver in 2010. That year, he resulted vice-champion at the FIA GT3 European Championship for Prospeed with two wins. Also, he raced in several endurance races, such as the VLN for Manthey, the Le Mans Series for Prospeed, Petit Le Mans for Flying Lizard, and the 24 Hours of Le Mans for BMS Scuderia Italia, resulting third in the GT2 class.

Holzer competed partial-time at the 2011 American Le Mans Series for Flying Lizard, the five rounds of the Le Mans Series for Prospeed, and the VLN, where he got an overall win with a hybrid Porsche 911.

In 2012, Holzer raced full-time at the American Le Mans Series for Flying Lizard in the GT class, collecting a best result of fifth at Virginia, and the International GT Open for Manthey, winning three races and resulting vice-champion in the Super GT class. The driver switched to Paul Miller Racing for the 2013 American Le Mans Series, still as Porsche works driver, resulting 13th in the GT class.

Holzer was dropped by Porsche in late 2014.

In 2016, Holzer joined Abt Sportsline to compete at the ADAC GT Masters with a Bentley Continental GT.

== Racing record ==
=== Career summary ===
Season	Series	Team	Races	Wins	Poles	FLaps	Podiums	Points	Position
2004	Formula BMW ADAC	AM-Holzer Rennsport	19	0	0	0	0	4	20th
2005	Formula BMW ADAC	AM-Holzer Rennsport	19	0	0	0	1	41	13th
2005	Formula BMW World Final	AM-Holzer Rennsport	1	1	0	0	1	N/A	**1st**
2006	Formula BMW ADAC	AM-Holzer Rennsport	18	3	2	3	6	129	**3rd**
2006	Formula One	BMW Sauber	Test driver						
2007	Formula 3 Euro Series	AM-Holzer Rennsport	20	0	0	0	0	0	19th
2008	Porsche Supercup	UPS Porsche Junior Team	6	0	0	0	0	0	NC†
2009	Asian Le Mans Series - GT2	Team Felbermayr-Proton	2	0	1	0	2	13	5th
2009	Rolex Sports Car Series - GT	Riegel/Stanton/The Racer's Group	1	0	0	0	0	32	55th
2009	Rolex Sports Car Series - GT	Farnbacher-Loles Racing	1	0	0	0	0	32	55th
2009	FIA GT Championship - GT2	Brixia Racing	1	0	0	0	0	23	8th
2009	FIA GT Championship - GT2	Prospeed Competition	7	1	0	0	1	23	8th
2009	FIA GT3 European Championship	Prospeed Competition	2	0	0	0	0	6	33rd
2009	24 Hours of Nürburgring - SP9	Manthey Racing	1	0	0	0	0	N/A	5th
2010	American Le Mans Series - GT	Flying Lizard Motorsports	1	0	0	0	2	13	32nd
2010	Le Mans Series - GT2	Prospeed Competition	5	0	0	0	1	19	14th
2010	FIA GT3 European Championship	Prospeed Competition	12	2	?	?	6	137	**2nd**
2010	24 Hours of Le Mans - GT2	BMS Scuderia Italia	1	0	0	0	1	N/A	**3rd**
2010	24 Hours of Nürburgring - E1-XP Hybrid	Manthey Racing	1	0	0	0	0	N/A	DNF
2011	American Le Mans Series - GT	Flying Lizard Motorsports	6	0	0	0	0	53	10th
2011	Rolex Sports Car Series - GT	Magnus Racing	1	0	0	0	0	1	63rd
2011	Le Mans Series - LMGTE Pro	Prospeed Competition	5	0	0	0	0	25	7th
2011	24 Hours of Le Mans - LMGTE Pro	Prospeed Competition	1	0	0	0	1	N/A	8th
2011	24 Hours of Nürburgring - E1-XP Hybrid	Manthey Racing	1	1	0	0	1	N/A	**1st**
2012	American Le Mans Series - GT	Flying Lizard Motorsports	9	0	0	0	0	46	11th
2012	24 Hours of Le Mans - GTE Pro	Flying Lizard Motorsports	1	0	0	0	0	N/A	DNF
2012	Rolex Sports Car Series - GT	Alex Job Racing	1	0	0	0	0	16	110th
2012	International GT Open - Super GT	Manthey Racing	16	3	?	?	?	84	**2nd**
2012	24 Hours of Nürburgring - SP9	Manthey Racing	1	0	0	0	0	N/A	DNF
2013	American Le Mans Series - GT	Paul Miller Racing	10	0	0	0	0	44	13th
2013	Rolex Sports Car Series - GT	Alex Job Racing	1	0	0	0	0	25	66th
2013	FIA GT Series - Pro	Trackspeed	2	0	0	0	0	0	NC†
2013	Blancpain Endurance Series - Pro	Prospeed Competition	1	0	0	0	0	0	NC
2013	24 Hours of Nürburgring - SP9	Manthey Racing	1	0	0	0	0	N/A	10th
2014	United SportsCar Championship - GTLM	Team Falken Tire	10	1	0	0	2	65	24th
2014	United SportsCar Championship - GTD	Alex Job Racing	1	0	0	0	0	19	84th
2014	FIA World Endurance Championship - LMGTE Pro	Porsche Team Manthey	3	1	0	1	2	53	9th
2014	24 Hours of Le Mans - GTE Pro	Porsche Team Manthey	1	0	0	0	1	N/A	**3rd**
2014	Blancpain Sprint Series - Pro	Schütz Motorsport	2	0	0	0	0	12	20th
2015	United SportsCar Championship - GTD	Flying Lizard Motorsports	1	0	0	0	0	1	63rd
2015	24 Hours of Nürburgring - SP9	Haribo Racing Team	1	0	0	0	0	N/A	DNF
2016	ADAC GT Masters	Bentley Team Abt	7	0	0	0	0	0	NC
2016	24 Hours of Nürburgring - SP9	Bentley Abt	1	0	0	0	0	N/A	16th
2019	ADAC GT Masters	IronForce Racing	8	0	0	0	0	9	33rd
2019	Blancpain GT World Challenge America - Pro	Alegra Motorsports	9	0	0	0	2	86	9th
2019-20	FIA World Endurance Championship - LMGTE Am	Dempsey-Proton Racing	1	0	0	1	1	23	21st
2020	ADAC GT Masters	Joos Sportwagentechnik	2	0	0	0	0	0	NC
2020	24 Hours of Nürburgring - SP9 Pro-Am	Huber Motorsport	1	1	0	0	1	N/A	**1st**
2021	ADAC GT Masters	Joos Sportwagentechnik	6	0	0	0	0	58	16th
2021	ADAC GT Masters	KÜS Team Bernhard	2	0	0	0	1	58	16th
2021	24 Hours of Nürburgring - SP9 Pro	KCMG	1	0	0	0	0	N/A	22nd
2022	IMSA SportsCar Championship - GTD	NTE Sport	5	0	0	0	0	1205	18th
2024	24 Hours of Nürburgring - SP9 Pro	Dinamic GT	1	0	0	0	0	N/A	12th
2025	24 Hours of Nürburgring - SP9 Pro-Am	Hankook Competition	1	0	0	0	0	N/A	4th
2026	Nürburgring Langstrecken-Serie - AT2	Manthey Racing							
2026	Nürburgring Langstrecken-Serie - SP-Pro	Manthey Racing							
2026	24 Hours of Nürburgring - SP-Pro	Manthey Team eFuel Griesemann	1	1	1	1	1	N/A	**1st**
2026	Nürburgring Langstrecken-Serie - SP7	W&S Motorsport							

† As Holzer was a guest driver, he was ineligible to score points.

=== 24 Hours of Le Mans results ===
Year	Team	Co-Drivers	Car	Class	Laps	Pos.	Class Pos.
2010	(Italy) BMS Scuderia Italia	(United Kingdom) Richard Westbrook (Germany) Timo Scheider	Porsche 997 GT3-RSR	GT2	327	14th	**3rd**
2011	(Belgium) Prospeed Competition	(Belgium) Marc Goossens (Netherlands) Jaap van Lagen	Porsche 997 GT3-RSR	GTE; Pro	293	23rd	8th
2012	(United States) Flying Lizard Motorsports	(Germany) Jörg Bergmeister (United States) Patrick Long	Porsche 997 GT3-RSR	GTE; Pro	114	DNF	DNF
2014	(Germany) Porsche Team Manthey	(France) Frédéric Makowiecki (Austria) Richard Lietz	Porsche 911 RSR	GTE; Pro	337	15th	**3rd**

=== Complete FIA World Endurance Championship results ===
Year	Team	Class	Car	Engine	1	2	3	4	5	6	7	8	Pos.	Points
2014	Porsche Team Manthey	LMGTE Pro	Porsche 911 RSR	Porsche 4.0 L Flat-6	SIL; 1	SPA; 9	LMS; 2	COA	FUJ	SHA	BHR	SÃO	9th	53
2019–20	Dempsey-Proton Racing	LMGTE Am	Porsche 911 RSR	Porsche 4.0 L Flat-6	SIL	FUJ	SHA	BHR	COA	SPA	LMS	BHR; 3	21st	23

=== Complete IMSA SportsCar Championship results ===
(key) (Races in bold indicate pole position; results in italics indicate fastest lap)

Year	Team	Class	Make	Engine	1	2	3	4	5	6	7	8	9	10	11	12	Pos.	Points
2014	Alex Job Racing	GTD	Porsche 911 GT America	Porsche 4.0 L Flat-6	DAY; 15				DET								84th	19
2014	Team Falken Tire	GTLM	Porsche 911 RSR	Porsche 4.0 L Flat-6		SEB; 5	LBH; 8	LGA; 4		WGL; 9	MOS; 8	IMS; 9	ELK; 9	VIR; 2	COA; 8	PET; 1	24th	65
2015	Flying Lizard Motorsports	GTD	Audi R8 LMS ultra	Audi DAR 5.2 L V10	DAY	SEB; 14	LGA	DET	WGL	LIM	ELK	VIR	COA	PET			63rd	1
2022	NTE Sport	GTD	Lamborghini Huracán GT3 Evo	Lamborghini DGF 5.2 L V10	DAY	SEB	LBH	LGA; 6	MDO	DET	WGL; 12	MOS	LIM	ELK; 5	VIR; 13	PET; 9	18th	1205

Sporting positions
Preceded by None	Formula BMW World Final; Winner; 2005	Succeeded by Christian Vietoris
