= Matthew Howson =

British racing driver (born 1983)

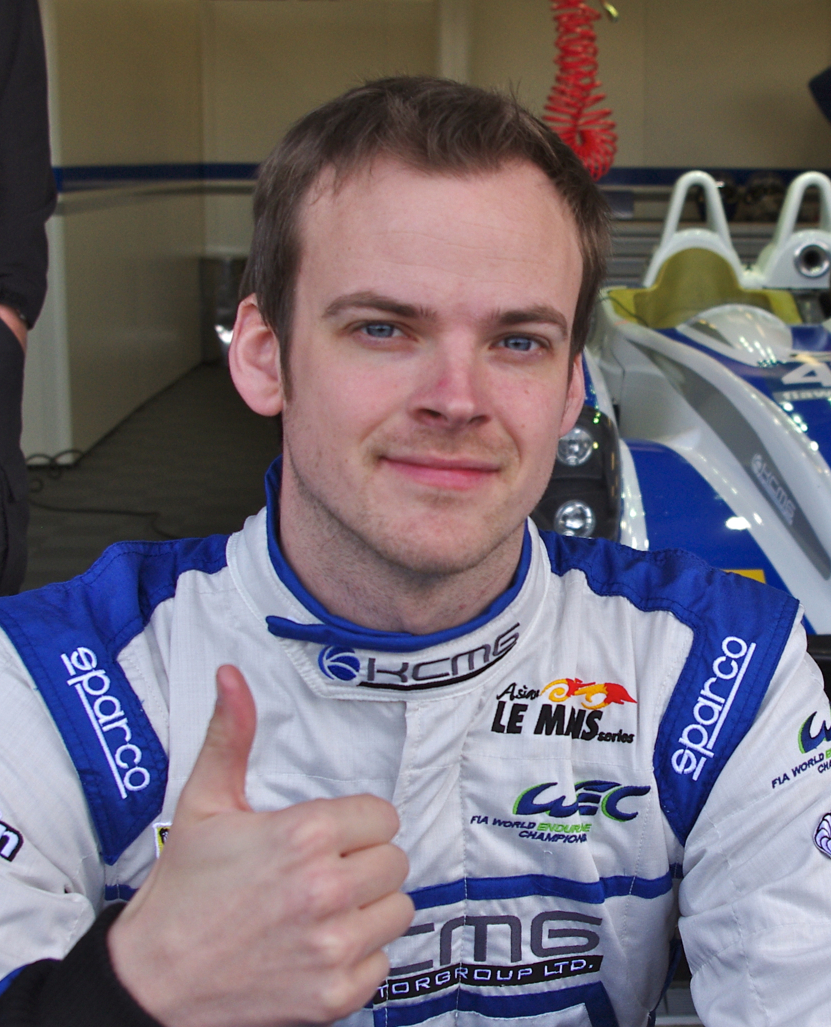
- Howson during the 2013 6 Hours of Silverstone
- Nationality: (United Kingdom) British
- Born: 25 August 1983 (age 43) Norwich, Norfolk, England
- Categorisation: FIA Silver

Matthew Graham Howson (born 25 August 1983 in Norwich, Norfolk, England) is a British racing driver. Howson won the LMP2 class at the 2015 24 Hours of Le Mans for KCMG with Richard Bradley and Nicolas Lapierre. He has been KCMG's team manager since 2020.

== Career results ==
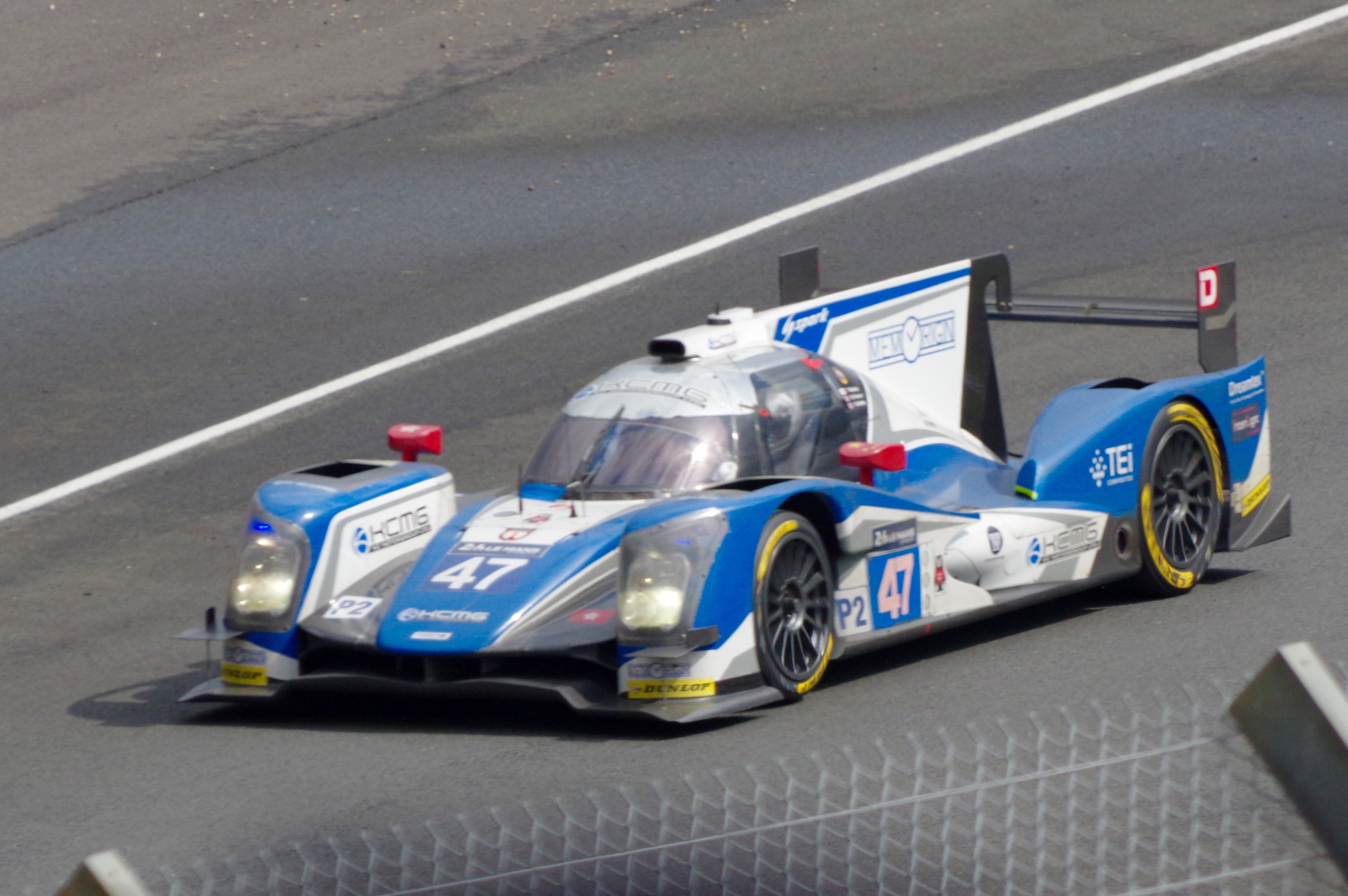
Howson racing for KCMG at the 2016 Le Mans 24 Hours.

=== 24 Hours of Le Mans results ===
Year	Team	Co-Drivers	Car	Class	Laps	Pos.	Class Pos.
2013	(China) KCMG	(Switzerland) Alexandre Imperatori (China) Ho-Pin Tung	Morgan LMP2-Nissan	LMP2	241	DNF	DNF
2014	(Hong Kong) KCMG	(United Kingdom) Richard Bradley (Switzerland) Alexandre Imperatori	Oreca 03R-Nissan	LMP2	87	DNF	DNF
2015	(Hong Kong) KCMG	(United Kingdom) Richard Bradley (France) Nicolas Lapierre	Oreca 05-Nissan	LMP2	358	9th	1st
2016	(Hong Kong) KCMG	(United Kingdom) Richard Bradley (Japan) Tsugio Matsuda	Oreca 05-Nissan	LMP2	116	DNF	DNF
