= 2008 European Touring Car Cup =

Motorsport contest

Seasons
- ← 2007 2009 →

Layout of the Salzburgring

The 2008 FIA European Touring Car Cup was the fourth running of the FIA European Touring Car Cup. It was held on 19 October 2008 at the Salzburgring near Salzburg in Austria.

== Teams and drivers ==
Super 2000 class
Team	Car	No	Drivers
(Denmark) Chevrolet Motorsport Danmark	Chevrolet Lacetti	1	(Denmark) Michel Nykjær
(Sweden) Honda Racing	Honda Accord Euro R	2	(Sweden) Tomas Engström
(Sweden) Flash Engineering	BMW 320si	3	(Sweden) Richard Göransson
(Sweden) Flash Engineering	BMW 320si	9	(Sweden) Jan Nilsson
(Russia) Golden Motors	Honda Accord Euro R	4	(Russia) Alexander Lvov
(Russia) Golden Motors	Honda Accord Euro R	5	(Russia) Andrey Smetsky
(Germany) Liqui Moly Team Engstler	BMW 320i	6	(Russia) Oleg Petrishin
(Germany) Liqui Moly Team Engstler	BMW 320si	11	(Germany) Franz Engstler
(Germany) Liqui Moly Team Engstler	BMW 320si	27	(Portugal) César Campaniço
(Spain) SUNRED Motorsport Development	SEAT León	7	(Spain) Oscar Nogués
(Denmark) Poulsen Motorsport	BMW 320si	8	(Denmark) Kristian Poulsen
(Denmark) Hartmann Honda Racing	Honda Accord Euro R	11	(Denmark) Jens Reno Møller
GTM Finland	BMW 320si	14	(Finland) Mikko Eskelinen
(Austria) Kissling Motorsport	Opel Astra GTC	15	(Austria) Wolfgang Treml
(Germany) Yaco Racing	Toyota Auris	16	(Germany) Philip Geipel
(Germany) Yaco Racing	Toyota Corolla T-Sport	17	(Germany) Charlie Geipel
(Latvia) JH Motorsport	Honda Civic Type R	18	(Latvia) Janis Horeliks
(Estonia) Saksa Auto AMK	BMW 320si	19	(Estonia) Urmas Kitsing
(Switzerland) Rikli Motorsport Equipe Bernoise	Honda Accord Euro R	20	(Switzerland) Peter Rikli
(Russia) Sport-Garage	Ford Focus	21	(Russia) Sergey Krylov
(Bulgaria) Petrol GT Racing Team	BMW 320si	22	(Bulgaria) George Tanev
Super Production class
(Latvia) Spice Racing Team	Honda Integra Type-R	52	(Latvia) Egons Lapins
(Lithuania) Zaibelis	Honda Integra Type-R	53	(Lithuania) Paulius Krukauskas
(Italy) F. Motorsport	BMW 320i	54	(Italy) Fabio Fabiani
(Italy) F. Motorsport	BMW 320i	55	(Italy) Imerio Brigliadori
(Russia) Aimol Racing	Opel Astra Coupé	56	(Russia) Dmitriy Dobrovolsky
(Russia) Sport-Garage	Volkswagen Golf IV	57	(Russia) Nikolay Karamyshev
Super 1600 class
(Germany) TLM Team Lauderbach Motorsport	Ford Fiesta ST	72	(Germany) Ralf Martin
(Germany) TLM Team Lauderbach Motorsport	Ford Fiesta ST	75	(Ukraine) Andrii Kruglik
(Germany) NK Racing Team	Ford Fiesta ST	73	(Germany) Carsten Seifert
(Germany) Roscher Racing	Citroën C2 VTS	74	(Germany) Jens Löhnig
(Germany) ETH Tuning	Peugeot 207 Sport	76	(Germany) Guido Thierfelder
(Russia) Sport-Garage	Volkswagen Polo GTi	77	(Russia) Sergey Ryabov

== Results ==
=== Race 1 ===
Pos	No	Class	Driver	Team	Car	Laps	Time/Retired	Grid	Class Points
1	1	S2000	(Denmark) Michel Nykjær	Chevrolet Motorsport Danmark	Chevrolet Lacetti	12	17:51.594	1	10
2	3	S2000	(Sweden) Richard Göransson	Flash Engineering	BMW320si	12	+0.190	2	8
3	7	S2000	(Spain) Oscar Nogués	SUNRED Motorsport Development	SEAT León	12	+11.506	6	6
4	10	S2000	(Denmark) Kristian Poulsen	Poulsen Motorsport	BMW 320si	12	+14.750	4	5
5	27	S2000	(Portugal) César Campaniço	Liqui Moly Team Engstler	BMW 320si	12	+15.096	7	4
6	11	S2000	(Denmark) Jens Reno Møller	Hartmann Honda Racing	Honda Accord Euro R	12	+29.739	8	3
7	14	S2000	(Finland) Mikko Eskelinen	GTM Finland	BMW 320si	12	+30.363	10	2
8	9	S2000	(Sweden) Jan Nilsson	Flash Engineering	BMW 320si	12	+30.703	5	1
9	22	S2000	(Bulgaria) George Tanev	Petrol GT Racing Team	BMW 320si	12	+32.502	13	
10	4	S2000	(Russia) Alexander Lvov	Golden Motors	Honda Accord Euro R	12	+36.204	11	
11	17	S2000	(Germany) Charlie Geipel	Yaco Racing	Toyota Corolla T-Sport	12	+39.535	12	
12	20	S2000	(Switzerland) Peter Rikli	Rikli Motorsport Equipe Bernoise	Honda Accord Euro R	12	+41.244	14	
13	5	S2000	(Russia) Andrey Smetsky	Golden Motors	Honda Accord Euro R	12	+50.617	17	
14	19	S2000	(Estonia) Urmas Kitsing	Saksa Auto AMK	BMW 320si	12	+1:07.408	27	
15	15	S2000	(Austria) Wolfgang Treml	Kissling Motorsport	Opel Astra GTC	12	+1:20.245	15	
16	6	S2000	(Russia) Oleg Petrishin	Liqui Moly Team Engstler	BMW 320i	12	+1:20.796	16	
17	54	SP	(Italy) Fabio Fabiani	F. Motorsport	BMW 320i	11	+ 1 Lap	18	10
18	57	SP	(Russia) Nikolay Karamyshev	Sport-Garage	Volkswagen Golf IV	11	+ 1 Lap	20	8
19	72	S1600	(Germany) Ralf Martin	TLM Team Lauderbach Motorsport	Ford Fiesta ST	11	+ 1 Lap	21	10
20	75	S1600	(Ukraine) Andrii Kruglik	TLM Team Lauderbach Motorsport	Ford Fiesta ST	11	+ 1 Lap	24	8
21	73	S1600	(Germany) Carsten Seifert	NK Racing Team	Ford Fiesta ST	11	+ 1 Lap	28	6
22	77	S1600	(Russia) Sergey Ryabov	Sport-Garage	Volkswagen Polo GTi	11	+ 1 Lap	26	5
23	52	SP	(Latvia) Egons Lapins	Spice Racing Team	Honda Integra Type-R	10	+ 2 Laps	25	6
24	76	S1600	(Germany) Guido Thierfelder	ETH Tuning	Peugeot 207 Sport	10	+ 2 Laps	23	4
NC	12	S2000	(Germany) Franz Engstler	Liqui Moly Team Engstler	BMW 320si	6	+ 6 Laps	3	
Ret	2	S2000	(Sweden) Tomas Engström	Honda Racing	Honda Accord Euro R	5	+ 7 Laps	9	
Ret	18	S2000	(Latvia) Janis Horeliks	JH Motorsport	Honda Civic Type-R	5	+ 7 Laps	19	
Ret	74	S1600	(Germany) Jens Löhnig	Roscher Racing	Citroën C2 VTS	0		22	
DNS	16	S2000	(Germany) Philip Geipel	Yaco Racing	Toyota Auris		DNS		
DNS	56	SP	(Russia) Dmitriy Dobrovolsky	Aimol Racing	Opel Astra Coupé		DNS		

== Final standings ==
Pos	Driver	Race 1	Race 2	Pts
Super 2000
1	(Denmark) Michel Nykjær	**1**	2	18
2	(Spain) Oscar Nogués	3	1	16
3	(Sweden) Richard Göransson	2	3	14
4	(Portugal) César Campaniço	5	7	6
5	(Denmark) Jens Reno Møller	6	6	6
6	(Denmark) Kristian Poulsen	4	18	5
7	(Germany) Franz Engstler	NC	4	5
8	(Sweden) Tomas Engström	Ret	5	4
9	(Finland) Mikko Eskelinen	7	8	3
10	(Sweden) Jan Nilsson	8	**Ret**	1
11	(Bulgaria) George Tanev	9	Ret	0
12	(Austria) Wolfgang Treml	15	9	0
13	(Russia) Alexander Lvov	10	11	0
14	(Russia) Oleg Petrishin	16	10	0
15	(Germany) Charlie Geipel	11	Ret	0
16	(Switzerland) Peter Rikli	12	19	0
17	(Russia) Andrey Smetsky	13	12	0
18	(Estonia) Urmas Kitsing	14	Ret	0
19	(Latvia) Janis Horeliks	Ret	DNS	0
20	(Germany) Philip Geipel	DNS	Ret	0
Super Production
1	(Italy) Fabio Fabiani	**17**	**13**	20
2	(Russia) Nikolay Karamyshev	18	17	16
3	(Latvia) Egons Lapins	23	21	12
-	(Russia) Dmitriy Dobrovolsky	DNS	DNS	0
Super 1600
1	(Germany) Ralf Martin	**19**	**14**	20
2	(Germany) Carsten Seifert	21	15	14
3	(Ukraine) Andrii Kruglik	20	16	14
4	(Russia) Sergey Ryabov	22	20	10
5	(Germany) Guido Thierfelder	24	22	8
6	(Germany) Jens Löhnig	Ret	Ret	0
Pos	Driver	Race 1	Race 2	Pts

Colour	Result
Gold	Winner
Silver	Second place
Bronze	Third place
Green	Points classification
Blue	Non-points classification
Blue	Non-classified finish (NC)
Purple	Retired, not classified (Ret)
Red	Did not qualify (DNQ)
Red	Did not pre-qualify (DNPQ)
Black	Disqualified (DSQ)
White	Did not start (DNS)
White	Withdrew (WD)
White	Race cancelled (C)
Blank	Did not practice (DNP)
Blank	Did not arrive (DNA)
Blank	Excluded (EX)

**Bold** – Pole
Italics – Fastest Lap
