= 2007 European Touring Car Cup =

Motorsport contest

Seasons
- ← 2006 2008 →

Layout of the Adria International Raceway

The 2007 FIA European Touring Car Cup was the third running of the FIA European Touring Car Cup. It was held on 28 October 2007 at the Adria International Raceway near Adria in Italy.

== Teams and drivers ==
Super 2000 class
Team	Car	No	Drivers
(Sweden) Engström Motorsport	Honda Accord Euro R	2	(Sweden) Tomas Engström
(Russia) Golden Motors	Honda Accord Euro R	4	(Russia) Alexander Lvov
(Russia) Golden Motors	Honda Accord Euro R	5	(Russia) Andrey Smetsky
(Germany) Engstler Motorsport	BMW 320i	6	(Russia) Oleg Petrishin
(Germany) Engstler Motorsport	BMW 320i	7	(United Kingdom) Richard Kaye
(Italy) Promotorsport Squadra Corse	BMW 320i	8	(Italy) Roberto Conte
(Italy) Promotorsport Squadra Corse	BMW 320i	9	(Italy) Riccardo Bianco
(Denmark) Poulsen Motorsport	BMW 320si	10	(Denmark) Kristian Poulsen
(Denmark) Poulsen Motorsport	BMW 320si	23	(Republic of Ireland) Emmet O'Brien
(Denmark) Hartmann Honda Racing	Honda Accord Euro R	11	(Denmark) Jens Reno Møller
(Italy) Arsenio Corse	BMW 320i	12	(Italy) Cesare Cremonesi
(Denmark) Chevrolet Motorsport Danmark	Chevrolet Lacetti	14	(Sweden) Pontus Mörth
(Denmark) Chevrolet Motorsport Danmark	Chevrolet Lacetti	15	(Denmark) Henrik Lundgaard
(Germany) TFS-Yaco Racing	Toyota Corolla T-Sport	16	(Germany) Philip Geipel
(Germany) TFS-Yaco Racing	Toyota Corolla T-Sport	17	(Austria) Charlie Geipel
(Latvia) JH Motorsport	Honda Civic Type R	18	(Latvia) Janis Horeliks
(Russia) Autosport Projects	Audi A4	19	(Russia) Alexander Lvov Jr.
(Russia) Autosport Projects	Ford Focus	20	(Russia) Yuriy Odud
(Czech Republic) O2 Motorsport CSMS	Alfa Romeo 156 GTA	21	(Czech Republic) Michal Matejovský
(Italy) Zerocinque Motorsport	BMW 320i	22	(San Marino) Stefano Valli
(Italy) Zerocinque Motorsport	BMW 320i	30	(Italy) Alessandro Canali
(Hong Kong) GR Asia	SEAT León	24	(Denmark) Michel Nykjær
(Hong Kong) GR Asia	SEAT León	25	(Italy) Maurizio Ceresoli
(Sweden) MB Sport	Mercedes C200	26	(Sweden) Tobias Johansson
(Portugal) Sports & You	BMW 320si	27	(Portugal) César Campaniço
(Italy) Team GPS Mercurio	Honda Civic Euro R	31	(Italy) Massimo Arduini
Super Production class
(Russia) Rostokino-Lada	Honda Civic Euro R	52	(Russia) Aleksey Basov
(Russia) Rostokino-Lada	Honda Civic Euro R	53	(Russia) Nikolay Agapov
(Italy) Gruppo Piloti Forlivesi	BMW 320i	54	(Italy) Fabio Fabiani
(Italy) Gruppo Piloti Forlivesi	BMW 320i	55	(Italy) Alessandro Revello
(Russia) Aimol Racing	Opel Astra Coupé	56	(Russia) Dmitriy Dobrovolsky
(Russia) Aimol Racing	Opel Astra Coupé	57	(Russia) Arkadiy Pavlovskiy
(Russia) SumTel Racing Dynamo Avtorsport	BMW 320i	58	(Russia) Anton Markin
Super 1600 class
(Russia) BMS Racing	Volkswagen Polo GTi	70	(Russia) Mikhail Barabin
(Russia) BMS Racing	Volkswagen Polo GTi	71	(Russia) Andrey Nikolaev
(Russia)	Volkswagen Polo GTi	72	(Russia) Maxim Tsimbalov
(Germany) Citroen Ravenol Team	Citroen C2 VTS	74	(Germany) Jens Lohnig
(Germany) Thate Motorsport	Ford Fiesta ST	75	(Germany) Jens-Guido Weimann

== Final standings ==
Pos	Driver	Race 1	Race 2	Pts
Super 2000
1	(Denmark) Michel Nykjær	2	1	18
2	(Sweden) Tomas Engström	**1**	4	15
3	(Denmark) Kristian Poulsen	6	2	11
4	(Republic of Ireland) Emmet O'Brien	3	5	10
5	(Russia) Alexander Lvov	4	6	8
6	(Sweden) Pontus Mörth	9	3	6
7	(Germany) Philip Geipel	5	Ret	4
8	(Denmark) Henrik Lundgaard	Ret	7	2
9	(Denmark) Jens Reno Møller	7	Ret	2
10	(Austria) Charlie Geipel	8	24	1
11	(Portugal) César Campaniço	Ret	8	1
12	(Italy) Maurizio Ceresoli	Ret	9	0
13	(Sweden) Tobias Johansson	10	11	0
14	(San Marino) Stefano Valli	Ret	10	0
15	(Latvia) Janis Horeliks	11	14	0
16	(United Kingdom) Richard Kaye	12	Ret	0
17	(Italy) Riccardo Bianco	13	12	0
18	(Italy) Alessandro Canali	29	13	0
19	(Italy) Cesare Cremonesi	14	DNS	0
20	(Italy) Massimo Arduini	15	Ret	0
21	(Russia) Oleg Petrishin	17	15	0
22	(Russia) Andrey Smetsky	16	21	0
23	(Italy) Roberto Conte	Ret	16	0
24	(Russia) Yuriy Odud	22	23	0
25	(Russia) Alexander Lvov Jr.	Ret	Ret	0
26	(Czech Republic) Michal Matejovský	Ret	DNS	0
Super Production
1	(Russia) Aleksey Basov	**18**	**17**	20
2	(Russia) Nikolay Agapov	21	18	13
3	(Russia) Arkadiy Pavlovskiy	19	20	13
4	(Russia) Dmitriy Dobrovolsky	25	19	10
5	(Russia) Anton Markin	20	Ret	6
6	(Italy) Fabio Fabiani	Ret	22	4
-	(Italy) Alessandro Revello	DNS	DNS	0
Super 1600
1	(Germany) Jens-Guido Weimann	**23**	**25**	20
2	(Germany) Jens Löhnig	24	26	14
3	(Russia) Maxim Tsimbalov	26	27	14
4	(Russia) Mikhail Barabin	27	28	10
5	(Russia) Andrey Nikolaev	28	29	8
Pos	Driver	Race 1	Race 2	Pts

Colour	Result
Gold	Winner
Silver	Second place
Bronze	Third place
Green	Points classification
Blue	Non-points classification
Blue	Non-classified finish (NC)
Purple	Retired, not classified (Ret)
Red	Did not qualify (DNQ)
Red	Did not pre-qualify (DNPQ)
Black	Disqualified (DSQ)
White	Did not start (DNS)
White	Withdrew (WD)
White	Race cancelled (C)
Blank	Did not practice (DNP)
Blank	Did not arrive (DNA)
Blank	Excluded (EX)

**Bold** – Pole
Italics – Fastest Lap
