= 2016 Road to Le Mans =

Automobile endurance race in France

The track layout of the Circuit de la Sarthe

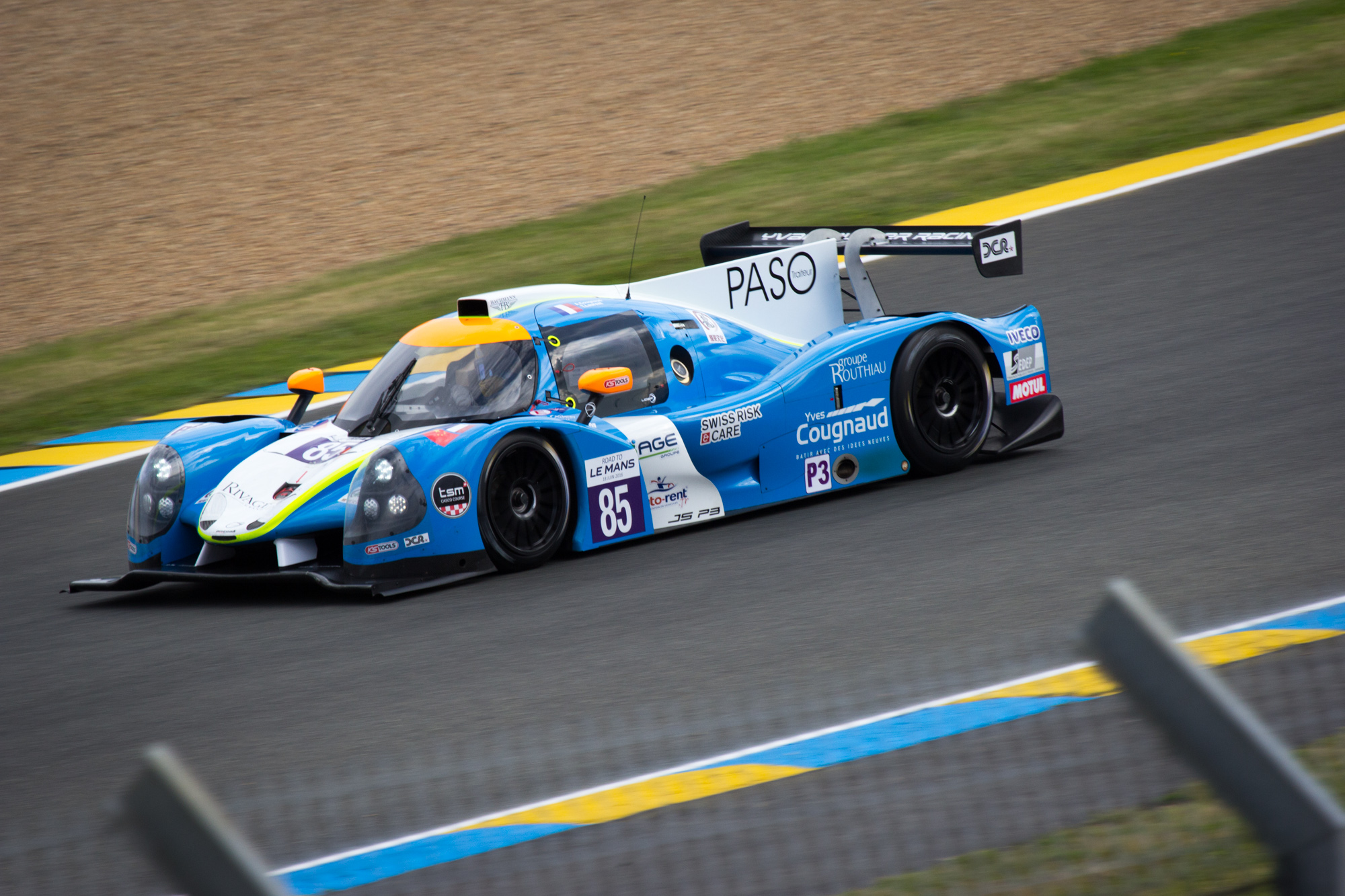
The race-winning No. 85 DC Racing Ligier JS P3-Nissan car

The 1st Road to Le Mans was an 55-minute automobile endurance event for 37 teams of one or two drivers racing Le Mans Prototype 3 (LMP3) and Group GT3 (GT3) cars. It was held on 18 June 2016 at the Circuit de la Sarthe near Le Mans, France, as a support race for the 2016 24 Hours of Le Mans and the second round of the 2016 GT3 Le Mans Cup. The Automobile Club de l'Ouest (ACO) organised the first Road to Le Mans race in partnership with the promoter Le Mans Endurance Management.

United Autosport's Martin Brundle and Christian England shared a Ligier JS P3-Nissan car and began from pole position after Brundle set the fastest overall lap time in qualifying. Brundle lost the race lead to Team LNT's Charlie Robertson and Lawrence Tomlinson at the start, which Tomlinson maintained until the mandatory pit stops. Alexandre Cougnaud and Thomas Laurent of DC Racing took the race lead following the pit stops and led the final six laps to win by 16.863 seconds over Brundle and England. The GT3 category was won by SMP Racing's Aleksey Basov and Viktor Shaytar in a Ferrari 458 Italia GT3 from FFF Racing Team by ACM's McLaren 650S GT3 shared by Hiroshi Hamaguchi and Adrian Quaife-Hobbs after Mentos Racing's Porsche 911 GT3 R of Klaus Bachler and Egidio Perfetti served a ten-second stop-and-go penalty for speeding in the pit lane.

== Background ==
A support race for the 2016 24 Hours of Le Mans was reported in October 2015, and formally announced the next month. The Automobile Club de l'Ouest (ACO) in partnership with the Le Mans Endurance Management promoter organised the 2016 Road to Le Mans event, which took place on 18 June 2016 at the Circuit de la Sarthe near Le Mans, France. It was the event's inaugural edition, the second round of the 2016 GT3 Le Mans Cup and served as a support event for the 2016 24 Hours of Le Mans.

Euan Hankey and Salih Yoluç led the Drivers' Championship with 25 championship points after winning the season-opening round at Imola in Italy, seven championship points ahead of Hiroshi Hamaguchi and Adrian Quaife-Hobbs in second and ten ahead of Nicolas Misslin and Matthieu Vaxivière in third. The No. 34 TF Sport team led the Teams' Championship with 25 championship points, seven championship points ahead of FFF Racing Team by ACM's No. 55 squad and ten ahead of the No. 26 Classic and Modern Racing team.

== Regulations and entrants ==
Entry to the event was open from 18 March to 15 April 2016. The ACO's selection committee issued invitations to Le Mans Prototype 3 (LMP3) vehicles from the ACO's continental racing series, the European Le Mans Series and/or the Asian Le Mans Series, as well as Group GT3 (GT3) cars from the GT3 Le Mans Cup (GT3 LMC). All current GT3 LMC full-season entries were automatically accepted while the ACO reserved the right to invite additional LMP3 and GT3 cars to the race. LMP3 teams could field one or two drivers; however GT3 teams could not field only one driver and was a non-championship race for them. Each team had to sign a bronze-rated driver (that is a gentleman driver). No platinum-rated driver (that is a professional driver) could participate. Each driver was permitted no more than 20 minutes to drive on the track. Michelin supplied the event's control tyres with each class receiving a single slick tyre specification.

The entry list was published on 19 May 2016. The 37-car entry list included 19 LMP3 and 18 GT3 cars, the first time such vehicles raced alongside each other in the LMC. Several of the LMP3 entries were ELMS competitors and all but two used Ligier JS P3-Nissan cars. The two non-Ligiers were a Ginetta P3-15-Nissan car and a ADESS 03-Nissan car. The GT3 LMC contributed 11 of the 17 entries in the GT3 class, and there were nine manufacturers represented in the category. AF Corse and Larbre Compétition were the only teams competing in the 24 Hours of Le Mans and the Road to Le Mans. The BMS Scuderia Italia Ferrari 458 Italia GT3 was the lone GT3 car missing from the entry list.

== Balance of performance ==
The balance of performance was modified to try to create parity within the GT3 category. Ballast was added to the No. 19 Tockwith Motorsports Audi R8 LMS ultra, the No. 26 Classic and Modern Racing Ferrari F458 Italia GT3, the No. 34 TF Sport Aston Martin V12 Vantage GT3, the No. 51 AF Corse Ferrari F458 Italia GT3 and the No. 55 FFF McLaren 650S GT3 to effect their handling while the Lamborghini Huracán GT3 was made 10 kg (22 lb) lighter. The Ferrari's power was reduced by a smaller air restrictor whilst the Lamborghini's was increased by a larger air restrictor. New entries are the No. 22 TF Sport Aston Martin, the No. 37 IDEC Sport Racing Mercedes-AMG GT3, the No. 44 DKR Engineering BMW Z4 GT3, the No. 50 Larbre Competition Mercedes-Benz, the No. 57 AF Corse Ferrari and the No. 66 Barwell Motorsport Lamborghini, each with a ballast of 10 kg (22 lb).

== Practice ==
Two one-hour practice sessions were held on the evening of 15 June and the afternoon of 16 June. During the first session, there was light rain and reportedly oil on the track, but track conditions improved. Thomas Laurent No. 85 DC Racing's car was fastest, with a lap time of 4:05.758 achieved on his sixth and last lap of the session. He was 4.128 seconds faster than James Winslow's second-placed No. 61 Graff Racing entry. Yann Ehrlacher's No. 18 M.Racing-YMR car was third. Philippe Prette's No. 48 PS Racing car stopped at the Esses with its front-left wheel detached on his out-lap. Viktor Shaytar's No. 57 AF Corse Ferrari was fastest in GT3 at 4:15.418. Shaytar was six-tenths of a second faster than Lonni Martins's No. 17 Duqueine Engineering's car. Klaus Bachler's No. 88 Mentos Racing Porsche 911 GT3 R was third in class.

Several cars went off the circuit during the second practice session and race control ended the session after 20 minutes when Jean-Claude Poirier wrecked the No. 31 Graff car into the tyre barrier at Mulsanne corner. Poirier was unhurt and exited the car unaided, but the barriers needed substantial repair and marshals removed excess oil from the circuit. Laurent's No. 85 DC Racing entry led overall at 4:21.444. John Falb's No. 77 Graff entry was 1.7 seconds slower in second. Jesus Fuster's No. 11 By Speed Factory Ligier stopped at the pit lane entry, prompting a six-minute slow zone at the Ford chicane to recover the vehicle. The fastest GT3 car was Egidio Perfetti's No. 88 Mentos Porsche, which was third overall in 4:24.020. Martins's No, 17 Duqueine Ferrari was three seconds and five overall positions behind in second in class. Tockwith's No. 19 Audi had to be driven slowly to the pit lane with a flat rear tyre.

== Qualifying ==
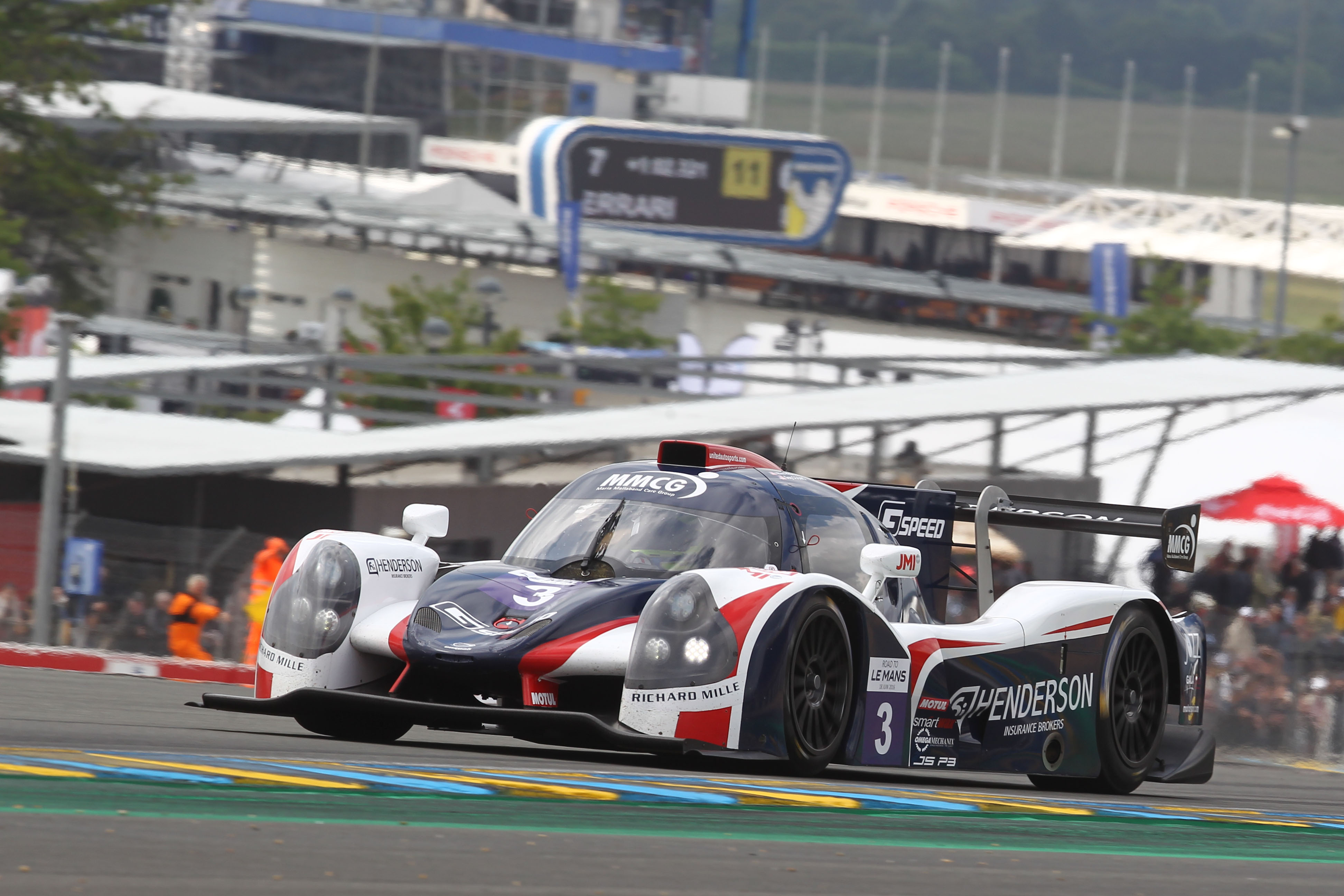
The No. 3 United Autosports Ligier as raced by Guy Cosmo and Mike Hedlund.

On the evening of 16 June, a 30-minute qualifying session was held to set the race's starting order. Qualifying was held in dry, cool weather. Martin Brundle's No. 2 United Autosports entry was second for most of the qualifying session until improving his lap time to 3:55.748 at the end for overall pole position and his second at Le Mans after the 1999 24 Hours of Le Mans. Charlie Robertson's No. 32 Team LNT entry was 0.185 seconds slower in second. Laurent's No. 85 DC Racing, Ehrlacher's No. 18 M.Racing-YMR, and Giorgio Sernagiotto's No. 7 Scuderia Villorba Corse finished third through fifth. Pierre Nicolet's No. 24 OAK Racing Ligier slid into the gravel trap at Tertre Rouge corner, crashing into the barriers midway through qualifying. Qualifying was stopped for the first time due to debris on the circuit but Nicolet returned to the pit lane. Perfetti's No. 88 Mentos Porsche took pole position in GT3 with a 4:04.494 lap. He was nearly seven-tenths of a second faster than Aleksey Basov's No. 57 SMP Racing Ferrari. Hamaguchi's No. 55 FFF Racing Team by ACM McLaren took third, ahead of Misslin's No. 26 Classic and Modern Racing Ferrari and Mads Rasmussen's No. 71 AF Corse Ferrari. A second stoppage ended qualifying two minutes early, as Hamaguchi spun into the tyre barriers at Karting Corner. Hamaguchi was unhurt.

=== Qualifying results ===
Teams who set the pole position lap time in each class are denoted in bold and by a †.

Final qualifying classification
Pos.	Class	No.	Team	Qualifying	Grid
1	**LMP3**	**2**	**United Autosports**	**3:55.748**	1†
2	LMP3	32	Team LNT	3:55.933	2
3	LMP3	85	DC Racing	3:56.247	3
4	LMP3	18	M.Racing-YMR	3:57.662	4
5	LMP3	7	Scuderia Villorba Corse	3:58.029	5
6	LMP3	61	Graff	3:58.485	6
7	LMP3	77	Graff	3:58.545	7
8	LMP3	31	Graff	3:58.547	8
9	LMP3	9	Racing Team Holland	4:00.410	9
10	LMP3	15	Duqueine Engineering	4:00.891	10
11	LMP3	3	United Autosports	4:00.891	11
12	LMP3	16	Duqueine Engineering	4:01.358	12
13	LMP3	24	OAK Racing	4:01.485	13
14	LMP3	24	360 Racing	4:02.055	14
15	**GT3**	**88**	**Mentos Racing**	**4:04.494**	15†
16	LMP3	11	By Speed Factory	4:04.856	16
17	GT3	11	SMP Racing	4:05.183	17
18	GT3	55	FFF Racing Team by ACM	4:07.168	18
19	LMP3	10	Race Performance	4:07.186	19
20	GT3	26	Classic and Modern Racing	4:08.112	20
21	GT3	71	AF Corse	4:08.790	21
22	GT3	34	TF Sport	4:10.559	22
23	LMP3	17	Duqueine Engineering	4:10.837	23
24	GT3	51	AF Corse	4:12.282	24
25	GT3	37	IDEC Sport Racing	4:12.879	25
26	LMP3	99	WinEurasia Limited	4:14.407	26
27	GT3	66	Barwell Motorsport	4:14.421	27
28	GT3	22	TF Sport	4:15.655	28
29	GT3	19	Tockwith Motorsports	4:15.860	29
30	GT3	8	Scuderia Villorba Corse	4:15.899	30
31	GT3	5	FFF Racing Team by ACM	4:19.035	31
32	LMP3	48	PS Racing Ltd.	4:20.042	32
33	GT3	25	FF Corse	4:26.129	33
34	GT3	50	Larbre Compétition	4:26.635	34
35	GT3	14	AF Corse	4:38.993	35
36	GT3	44	DKR Engineering	4:45.907	36
37	GT3	28	Delahaye Racing Team	4:45.968	37

== Race ==
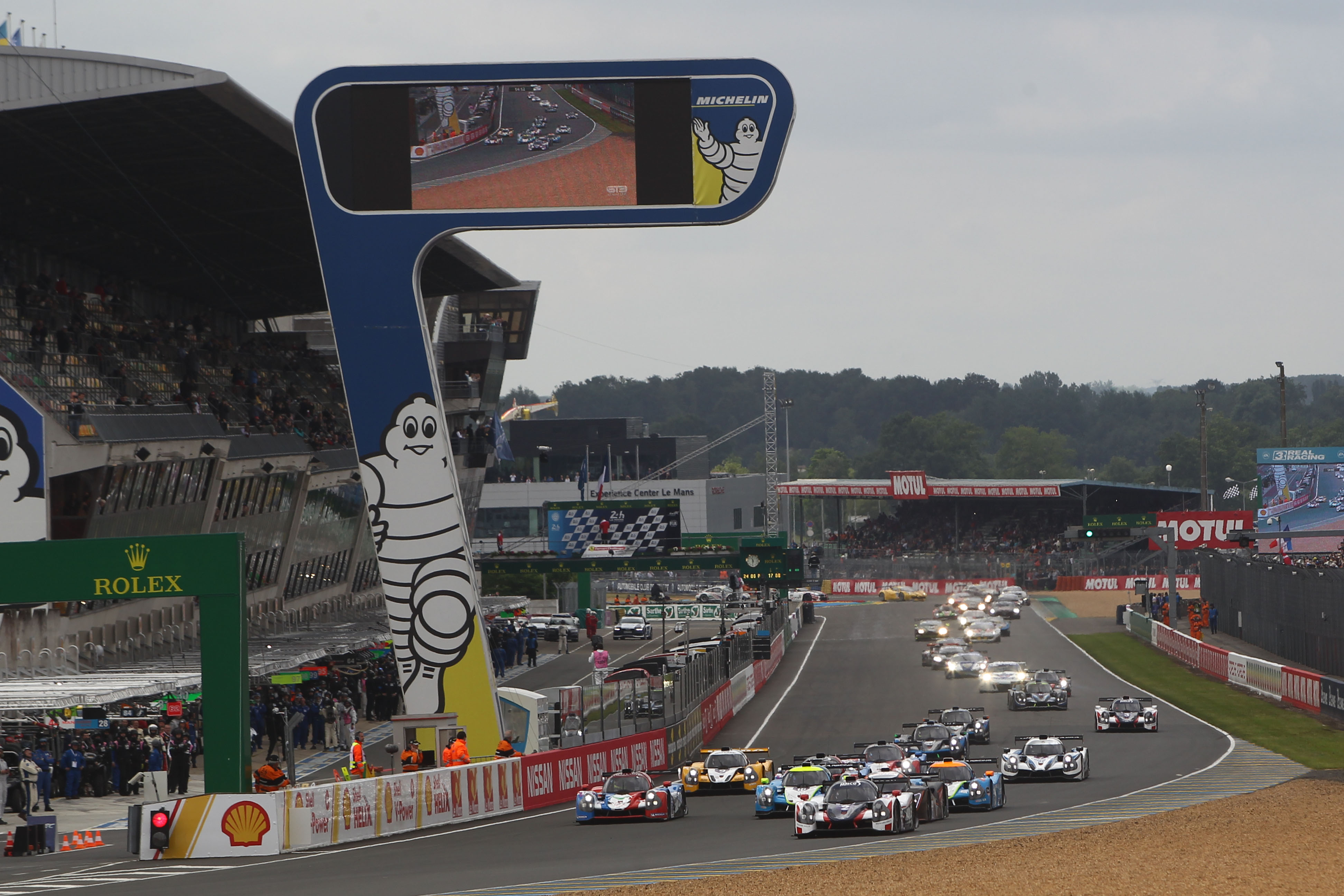
The start of the race

It was dry and overcast before the event. The air temperature was between 16.35 and 17.7 °C (61.43 and 63.86 °F) and the track temperature was between 20 and 21.75 °C (68.00 and 71.15 °F). The race commenced at 11:10 Central European Summer Time (UTC+02:00), which was led by the starting polesitter Brundle. Second-place starter Robertson battled Brundle as he crested the hill approaching the Dunlop chicane and braked later on the inside to take the race lead, despite Brundle appearing to have caught Robertson off guard when the race began. Winslow began quickly, moving from sixth to third before passing Brundle for second at the Mulsanne corner. Meanwhile, Perfetti maintained his lead in GT3 with the No. 88 Mentos Porsche, gradually pulling away from Basov's No. 57 SMP Ferrari.

During the first lap, Hamaguchi dropped from third to fifth in class, but he began duelling Misslin's No. 26 Classic and Modern Racing Ferrari for fourth while being challenged by Yoluç's No. 34 TF Sport Aston Martin until Yoluç's driver error while attempting to pass Hamaguchi at the Forza chicane gave him a temporary reprieve, allowing him to pull clear. On lap four, when Robertson began to pull away from the rest of the race, Brundle was close behind Winslow and passed him to retake second place overall. The following lap saw Phil Hanson's No. 44 Tockwith Audi driven slowly to the pit lane due to a failed front right tyre, while Martins overtook Basov for second in GT3 at the Indianapolis corner, but Basov retook the position at the same corner the following lap. Roberto Lacorte caused the race's first slow zone by going into the gravel trap at the Forza chicane. The No. 7 Scuderia Villoriba Corse car was recovered after five minutes and the slow zone was lifted.

At this point, cars began making mandatory pit stops to allow teams to change drivers. Robertson and Brundle made their pit stops on the same lap; however both drivers lost a significant amount of time to DC Racing's No. 85 team, and Laurent took the overall lead after the pit stops, having relieved his co-driver Alexandre Cougnaud who was fourth during his stint. Christian England had relieved Brundle but he spun the No. 2 United Autosports car exiting the Dunlop chicane. On his second lap, Lawrence Tomlinson lost control of the rear of the No. 32 Team LNT entry, which became stuck in the gravel at the Dunlop chicane. Tomlinson's spin activated the race's second slow zone, dropping him from second to tenth overall. The No. 88 Mentos Porsche received a ten-second stop-and-go penalty for speeding in the pit lane. Shaytar's No. 57 SMP Ferrari now led the GT3 category lead as Hankey's No. 34 TF Aston Martin, Vaxivière's No. 26 Classic and Modern Ferrari and Quaife-Hobbs's No. 55 FFF Ferrari battled for the final places on the podium in class.

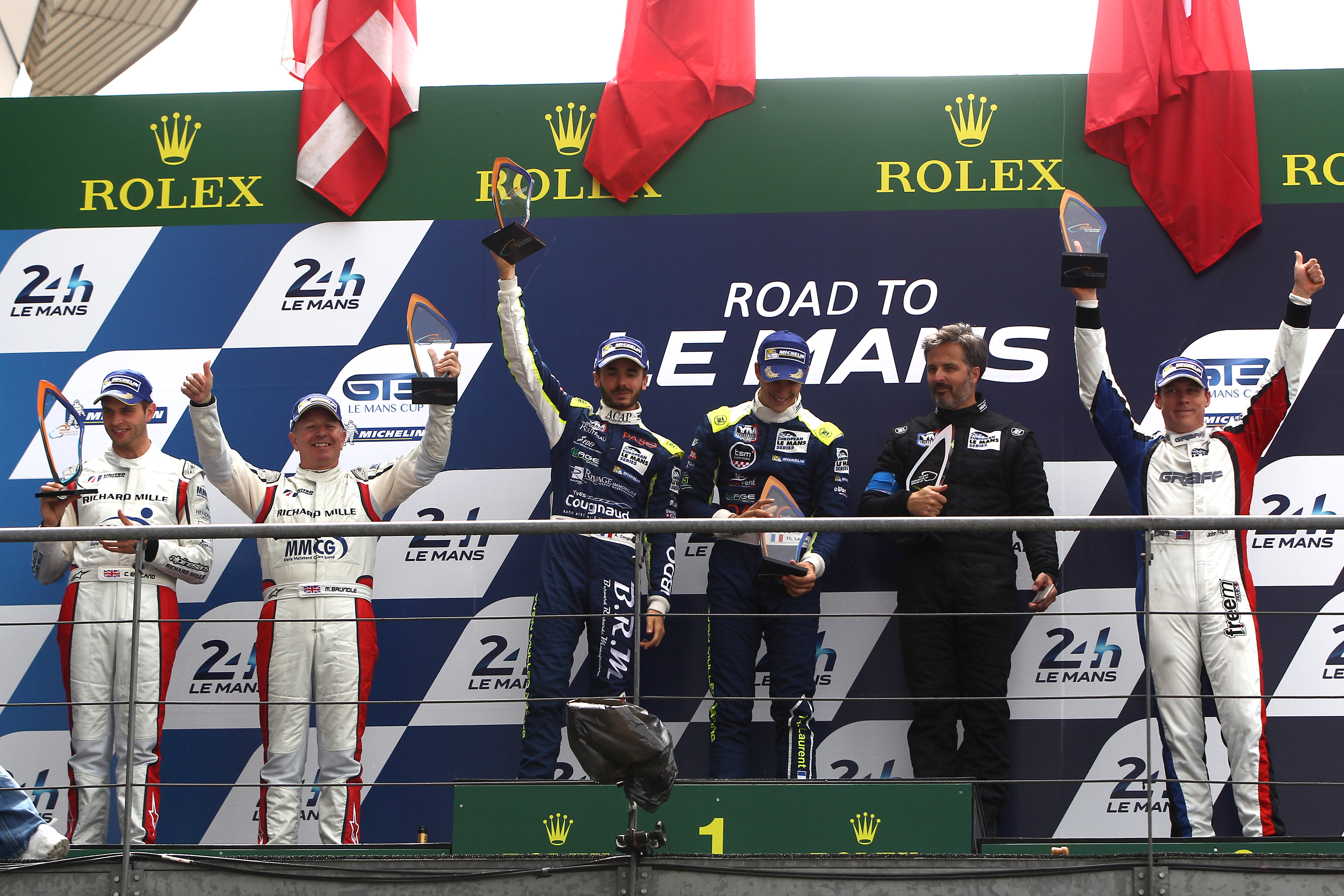
The podium ceremonies that were held following the completion of the race.

With ten minutes remaining, Hankey spun the No. 34 TF Aston Martin following the Dunlop chicane when scything his way by slower LMP3 cars. This moved Vaxivière, Quaife-Hobbs and Bachler to second, third and fourth in GT3. Romano Ricci's No. 18 M.Racing-YMR entry was third overall, but Falb's No. 77 Graff car was gaining on him and, on the suggestion of his engineer, passed him at the first chicane to take third on the final lap, having passed Dean Koutsoumidis's sister No. 61 Graff car on lap 11. Both Quaife-Hobbs and Bachler gained second and third in GT3 when Vaxiviere's Classic and Modern Ferrari sustained a puncture on the final lap. Laurent pulled away from the field and held the No. 85 DC Racing car's lead for the final six laps to win the race for himself and Cougnaud. The No. 2 United Autosports car recovered to finish second, 16.863 seconds behind. Falb competed alone in the No. 77 Graff entry, finishing third overall. The No. 57 AF Corse Ferrari won the GT3 category by 11.238 seconds over the No. 55 FFF McLaren, propelling the team and drivers Basov and Shaytar to third in the Drivers' and Teams' Championships. The No. 88 Mentos Porsche completed the class podium in third.

=== Race result ===
The minimum number of laps for classification (70% of the overall winning car's race distance) was seven laps. Class winners are in bold and ‡.

Final race classification
Pos.	Class	No.	Team	Drivers	Chassis	Laps	Time/Retired
Pos.	Class	No.	Team	Drivers	Engine	Laps	Time/Retired
1	**LMP3**	**85**	**(China) DC Racing**	**(France) Alexandre Cougnaud (France) Thomas Laurent**	**Ligier JS P3**	**13**	**55:30.230‡**
1	**LMP3**	**85**	**(China) DC Racing**	**(France) Alexandre Cougnaud (France) Thomas Laurent**	**Nissan VK50VE 5.0L V8**	**13**	**55:30.230‡**
2	LMP3	2	(United States) United Autosports	(United Kingdom) Martin Brundle (United Kingdom) Christian England	Ligier JS P3	13	+16.863
2	LMP3	2	(United States) United Autosports	(United Kingdom) Martin Brundle (United Kingdom) Christian England	Nissan VK50VE 5.0L V8	13	+16.863
3	LMP3	77	(France) Graff	(United States) John Falb	Ligier JS P3	13	+32.846
3	LMP3	77	(France) Graff	(United States) John Falb	Nissan VK50VE 5.0L V8	13	+32.846
4	LMP3	18	(France) M.Racing-YMR	(France) Yann Ehrlacher (France) Romano Ricci	Ligier JS P3	13	+35.566
4	LMP3	18	(France) M.Racing-YMR	(France) Yann Ehrlacher (France) Romano Ricci	Nissan VK50VE 5.0L V8	13	+35.566
5	LMP3	3	(United States) United Autosports	(United States) Guy Cosmo (United States) Mike Hedlund	Ligier JS P3	13	+39.428
5	LMP3	3	(United States) United Autosports	(United States) Guy Cosmo (United States) Mike Hedlund	Nissan VK50VE 5.0L V8	13	+39.428
6	LMP3	6	(United Kingdom) 360 Racing	(United Kingdom) James Swift (United Kingdom) Terrence Woodward	Ligier JS P3	13	+47.034
6	LMP3	6	(United Kingdom) 360 Racing	(United Kingdom) James Swift (United Kingdom) Terrence Woodward	Nissan VK50VE 5.0L V8	13	+47.034
7	LMP3	15	(France) Duqueine Engineering	(France) Thomas Dagoneau (United Kingdom) Alexis Kapadia	Ligier JS P3	13	+48.823
7	LMP3	15	(France) Duqueine Engineering	(France) Thomas Dagoneau (United Kingdom) Alexis Kapadia	Nissan VK50VE 5.0L V8	13	+48.823
8	LMP3	24	(France) OAK Racing	(France) Jacques Nicolet (France) Pierre Nicolet	Ligier JS P3	13	+49.204
8	LMP3	24	(France) OAK Racing	(France) Jacques Nicolet (France) Pierre Nicolet	Nissan VK50VE 5.0L V8	13	+49.204
9	**GT3**	**57**	**(Russia) SMP Racing**	**(Russia) Aleksey Basov (Russia) Viktor Shaytar**	**Ferrari 488 GT3**	**13**	**+57.918‡**
9	**GT3**	**57**	**(Russia) SMP Racing**	**(Russia) Aleksey Basov (Russia) Viktor Shaytar**	**Ferrari F154CB 3.9 L Turbo V8**	**13**	**+57.918‡**
10	LMP3	61	(France) Graff	(Australia) Dean Koutsoumidis (United Kingdom) James Winslow	Ligier JS P3	13	+1:03.281
10	LMP3	61	(France) Graff	(Australia) Dean Koutsoumidis (United Kingdom) James Winslow	Nissan VK50VE 5.0L V8	13	+1:03.281
11	GT3	55	(China) FFF Racing Team by ACM	(Japan) Hiroshi Hamaguchi (United Kingdom) Adrian Quaife-Hobbs	McLaren 650S GT3	13	+1:09.156
11	GT3	55	(China) FFF Racing Team by ACM	(Japan) Hiroshi Hamaguchi (United Kingdom) Adrian Quaife-Hobbs	McLaren M838T 3.8 L Turbo V8	13	+1:09.156
12	GT3	88	(Netherlands) Mentos Racing	(Austria) Klaus Bachler (Norway) Egidio Perfetti	Porsche 911 GT3 R	13	+1:11.384
12	GT3	88	(Netherlands) Mentos Racing	(Austria) Klaus Bachler (Norway) Egidio Perfetti	Porsche 4.0L flat-6	13	+1:11.384
13	LMP3	10	(Switzerland) Race Performance	(Switzerland) Giorgio Maggi (Switzerland) Marcello Marateotto	Ligier JS P3	13	+1:12.274
13	LMP3	10	(Switzerland) Race Performance	(Switzerland) Giorgio Maggi (Switzerland) Marcello Marateotto	Nissan VK50VE 5.0L V8	13	+1:12.274
14	GT3	34	(United Kingdom) TF Sport	(United Kingdom) Euan Hankey (Turkey) Salih Yoluç	Aston Martin V12 Vantage GT3	13	+1:27.512
14	GT3	34	(United Kingdom) TF Sport	(United Kingdom) Euan Hankey (Turkey) Salih Yoluç	Aston Martin 6.0 L V12	13	+1:27.512
15	GT3	51	(Italy) AF Corse	(Italy) Francesco Castellacci (Switzerland) Thomas Flohr	Ferrari 488 GT3	13	+1:34.373
15	GT3	51	(Italy) AF Corse	(Italy) Francesco Castellacci (Switzerland) Thomas Flohr	Ferrari F154CB 3.9 L Turbo V8	13	+1:34.373
16	LMP3	16	(France) Duqueine Engineering	(Switzerland) Antonin Borga (France) Laurent Millara	Ligier JS P3	13	+1:37.722
16	LMP3	16	(France) Duqueine Engineering	(Switzerland) Antonin Borga (France) Laurent Millara	Nissan VK50VE 5.0L V8	13	+1:37.722
17	GT3	22	(United Kingdom) TF Sport	(United Kingdom) Andrew Jarman (United Kingdom) Devon Modell	Aston Martin V12 Vantage GT3	13	+1:56.761
17	GT3	22	(United Kingdom) TF Sport	(United Kingdom) Andrew Jarman (United Kingdom) Devon Modell	Aston Martin 6.0 L V12	13	+1:56.761
18	GT3	17	(France) Duqueine Engineering	(France) Christophe Hamon (France) Lonni Martins	Ferrari 458 Italia GT3	13	+2:03.476
18	GT3	17	(France) Duqueine Engineering	(France) Christophe Hamon (France) Lonni Martins	Ferrari F136 4.5L V8	13	+2:03.476
19	GT3	66	(United Kingdom) Barwell Motorsport	(United Kingdom) James Cottingham (United Kingdom) Joe Twyman	Lamborghini Huracán GT3	13	+2:06.454
19	GT3	66	(United Kingdom) Barwell Motorsport	(United Kingdom) James Cottingham (United Kingdom) Joe Twyman	Lamborghini 5.2 L V10	13	+2:06.454
20	GT3	37	(France) IDEC Sport Racing	(France) Patrice Lafargue (France) Paul Lafargue	Mercedes-AMG GT3	13	+2:10.863
20	GT3	37	(France) IDEC Sport Racing	(France) Patrice Lafargue (France) Paul Lafargue	Mercedes-AMG M159 6.2 L V8	13	+2:10.863
21	GT3	8	(Italy) Scuderia Villorba Corse	(France) Steeve Hiesse (United Kingdom) Joe Twyman	Ferrari 458 Italia GT3	13	+2:19.659
21	GT3	8	(Italy) Scuderia Villorba Corse	(France) Steeve Hiesse (United Kingdom) Joe Twyman	Ferrari F136 4.5L V8	13	+2:19.659
22	GT3	16	(China) FFF Racing Team by ACM	(United Kingdom) Marco Attard (United Kingdom) Matt Bell	Lamborghini Huracán GT3	13	+2:23.115
22	GT3	16	(China) FFF Racing Team by ACM	(United Kingdom) Marco Attard (United Kingdom) Matt Bell	Lamborghini 5.2 L V10	13	+2:23.115
23	LMP3	99	(Hong Kong) WinEurasia Limited	(Hong Kong) William Lok	Ligier JS P3	13	+2:27.776
23	LMP3	99	(Hong Kong) WinEurasia Limited	(Hong Kong) William Lok	Nissan VK50VE 5.0L V8	13	+2:27.776
24	LMP3	31	(France) Graff	(France) Paul Petit (France) Jean Claude Poirier	Ligier JS P3	13	+2:32.467
24	LMP3	31	(France) Graff	(France) Paul Petit (France) Jean Claude Poirier	Nissan VK50VE 5.0L V8	13	+2:32.467
25	GT3	71	(Italy) AF Corse	(Portugal) Felipe Barreiros (Denmark) Mads Rasmussen	Ferrari 458 Italia GT3	13	+2:36.360
25	GT3	71	(Italy) AF Corse	(Portugal) Felipe Barreiros (Denmark) Mads Rasmussen	Ferrari F136 4.5L V8	13	+2:36.360
26	GT3	26	(France) Classic and Modern Racing	(France) Nicolas Misslin (France) Matthieu Vaxivière	Ferrari 458 Italia GT3	12	+1 Lap
26	GT3	26	(France) Classic and Modern Racing	(France) Nicolas Misslin (France) Matthieu Vaxivière	Ferrari F136 4.5L V8	12	+1 Lap
27	GT3	50	(France) Larbre Compétition	(France) Franck Labescat (France) Christian Philippon	Mercedes-Benz SLS AMG GT3	12	+1 Lap
27	GT3	50	(France) Larbre Compétition	(France) Franck Labescat (France) Christian Philippon	Mercedes-AMG M159 6.2 L V8	12	+1 Lap
28	GT3	51	(United Kingdom) FF Corse	(United Kingdom) Ivar Dunbar (United Kingdom) Johnny Mowlem	Ferrari 488 GT3	12	+1 Lap
28	GT3	51	(United Kingdom) FF Corse	(United Kingdom) Ivar Dunbar (United Kingdom) Johnny Mowlem	Ferrari F154CB 3.9 L Turbo V8	12	+1 Lap
29	LMP3	32	(United Kingdom) Team LNT	(United Kingdom) Charlie Robertson (United Kingdom) Lawrence Tomlinson	Ginetta P3-15	12	+1 Lap
29	LMP3	32	(United Kingdom) Team LNT	(United Kingdom) Charlie Robertson (United Kingdom) Lawrence Tomlinson	Nissan VK50VE 5.0L V8	12	+1 Lap
30	GT3	28	(Belgium) Delahaye Racing Team	(France) Pierre-Etienne Bordet (France) Alexandre Viron	Porsche 997 GT3-R	12	+1 Lap
30	GT3	28	(Belgium) Delahaye Racing Team	(France) Pierre-Etienne Bordet (France) Alexandre Viron	Porsche 4.0L V8	12	+1 Lap
31	GT3	44	(Luxembourg) DKR Engineering	(Netherlands) Niels Bouwhuis (Netherlands) Jan Storm	BMW Z4 GT3	12	+1 Lap
31	GT3	44	(Luxembourg) DKR Engineering	(Netherlands) Niels Bouwhuis (Netherlands) Jan Storm	BMW S65 4.4L V8	12	+1 Lap
32	LMP3	11	(Spain) By Speed Factory	(Spain) Jesus Fuster (United Kingdom) Rebecca Jackson	Ligier JS P3	12	+1 Lap
32	LMP3	11	(Spain) By Speed Factory	(Spain) Jesus Fuster (United Kingdom) Rebecca Jackson	Nissan VK50VE 5.0L V8	12	+1 Lap
33	LMP3	9	(Netherlands) Racing Team Holland	(Netherlands) Jan Lammers (Netherlands) Bernhard van Oranje	Ligier JS P3	12	+1 Lap
33	LMP3	9	(Netherlands) Racing Team Holland	(Netherlands) Jan Lammers (Netherlands) Bernhard van Oranje	Nissan VK50VE 5.0L V8	12	+1 Lap
34	LMP3	7	(Italy) Scuderia Villorba Corse	(Italy) Roberto Lacorte (Italy) Giorgio Sernagiotto	Ligier JS P3	12	+1 Lap
34	LMP3	7	(Italy) Scuderia Villorba Corse	(Italy) Roberto Lacorte (Italy) Giorgio Sernagiotto	Nissan VK50VE 5.0L V8	12	+1 Lap
35	GT3	44	(United Kingdom) Tockwith Motorsports	(United Kingdom) Phil Hanson (United Kingdom) Nigel Moore	Audi R8 LMS ultra	11	+2 Laps
35	GT3	44	(United Kingdom) Tockwith Motorsports	(United Kingdom) Phil Hanson (United Kingdom) Nigel Moore	Audi 5.2L V10	11	+2 Laps
36	GT3	14	(Italy) AF Corse	(Belgium) Adrien De Leener (Belgium) Pierre-Marie De Leener	Ferrari 458 Italia GT3	9	+4 Laps
36	GT3	14	(Italy) AF Corse	(Belgium) Adrien De Leener (Belgium) Pierre-Marie De Leener	Ferrari F136 4.5L V8	9	+4 Laps
37	LMP3	48	(Finland) PS Racing Ltd.	(Italy) Angelo Negro (Italy) Philippe Prette	ADESS-03	3	Did not finish
37	LMP3	48	(Finland) PS Racing Ltd.	(Italy) Angelo Negro (Italy) Philippe Prette	Nissan VK50VE 5.0L V8	3	Did not finish

== Championship standings after the race ==
- Note: Only the top five positions are included for the Drivers' and Teams' Championship standings.

GT3 Drivers' Championship standings
Pos.	+/–	Driver	Points
1		(United Kingdom) Euan Hankey (Turkey) Salih Yoluç	37
2		(Japan) Hiroshi Hamaguchi (United Kingdom) Adrian Quaife-Hobbs	36
3	8	(Russia) Aleksey Basov (Russia) Viktor Shaytar	25
4		(Italy) Francesco Castellacci (Switzerland) Thomas Flohr	22
5	5	(Austria) Klaus Bachler (Norway) Egidio Perfetti	16

GT3 Teams' Championship standings
Pos.	+/–	No.	Constructor	Points
1		34	(United Kingdom) TF Sport	37
2		55	(China) FFF Racing Team by ACM	36
3	8	57	(Italy) AF Corse	25
4		51	(Italy) AF Corse	22
5	5	88	(Netherlands) Mentos Racing	16
