= 2016 GT3 Le Mans Cup =

The 2016 GT3 Le Mans Cup, known as the 2016 Michelin GT3 Le Mans Cup under sponsorship, was the inaugural season of the GT3 Le Mans Cup. It began on 15 May at the Autodromo Enzo e Dino Ferrari and finished on 23 October at the Autódromo do Estoril. The series was open to grand tourer sports cars in the GT3 class.

== Calendar ==
The provisional 2016 calendar was announced at 16 December 2015. All rounds supported the European Le Mans Series (excepting Silverstone) and 24 Hours of Le Mans.

Round	Circuit	Location	Race length	Date	Supporting
1	(Italy) Autodromo Enzo e Dino Ferrari	Imola, Italy	2 hours	14 May	4 Hours of Imola, ELMS
2	(France) Circuit de la Sarthe	Le Mans, France	1 hour	18 June	24 Hours of Le Mans, WEC
3	(Austria) Red Bull Ring	Spielberg, Austria	2 hours	16 July	4 Hours of Red Bull Ring, ELMS
4	(France) Circuit Paul Ricard	Le Castellet, France	2 hours	27 August	4 Hours of Le Castellet, ELMS
5	(Belgium) Circuit de Spa-Francorchamps	Spa, Belgium	2 hours	24 September	4 Hours of Spa, ELMS
6	(Portugal) Autódromo do Estoril	Estoril, Portugal	2 hours	22 October	4 Hours of Estoril, ELMS

== Entry list ==
The full season was open to GT3 class cars.

Team	Car	No.	Drivers	Rounds
(China) FFF Racing Team by ACM	Lamborghini Huracán GT3	5	(Italy) Andrea Caldarelli	1, 3
(China) FFF Racing Team by ACM	Lamborghini Huracán GT3	5	(China) Fu Songyang	1
(China) FFF Racing Team by ACM	Lamborghini Huracán GT3	5	(United Kingdom) Marco Attard	2
(China) FFF Racing Team by ACM	Lamborghini Huracán GT3	5	(United Kingdom) Matthew Bell	2
(China) FFF Racing Team by ACM	Lamborghini Huracán GT3	5	(Japan) Taiyou Iida	3
(China) FFF Racing Team by ACM	McLaren 650S GT3	55	(Japan) Hiroshi Hamaguchi	All
(China) FFF Racing Team by ACM	McLaren 650S GT3	55	(United Kingdom) Adrian Quaife-Hobbs	All
(Italy) BMS Scuderia Italia	Ferrari 458 Italia GT3	7	(Italy) Matteo Cressoni	1, 4, 6
(Italy) BMS Scuderia Italia	Ferrari 458 Italia GT3	7	(Italy) Luigi Lucchini	1, 4, 6
(Italy) Villorba Corse	Ferrari 458 Italia GT3	8	(France) Steeve Hiesse	1–2, 4–6
(Italy) Villorba Corse	Ferrari 458 Italia GT3	8	(France) Cédric Mezard	1–2, 4–6
(Italy) AF Corse	Ferrari 458 Italia GT3	14	(Belgium) Adrien De Leener	2–6
(Italy) AF Corse	Ferrari 458 Italia GT3	14	(Belgium) Pierre Marie De Leener	2–6
(Italy) AF Corse	Ferrari 488 GT3	51	(Italy) Francesco Castellacci	All
(Italy) AF Corse	Ferrari 488 GT3	51	(Switzerland) Thomas Flohr	All
(Italy) AF Corse	Ferrari 488 GT3	57	(Russia) Aleksey Basov	2
(Italy) AF Corse	Ferrari 488 GT3	57	(Russia) Viktor Shaytar	2
(Italy) AF Corse	Ferrari 458 Italia GT3	71	(Portugal) Filipe Barreiros	All
(Italy) AF Corse	Ferrari 458 Italia GT3	71	(Denmark) Mads Rasmussen	All
(France) Duqueine Engineering	Ferrari 458 Italia GT3	17	(France) Christophe Hamon	2
(France) Duqueine Engineering	Ferrari 458 Italia GT3	17	(France) Lonni Martins	2
(United Kingdom) Tockwith Motorsport	Audi R8 LMS	19	(United Kingdom) Philip Hanson	1–3
(United Kingdom) Tockwith Motorsport	Audi R8 LMS	19	(United Kingdom) Nigel Moore	1–3
(United Kingdom) TF Sport	Aston Martin Vantage GT3	22	(United Kingdom) Andrew Jarman	2
(United Kingdom) TF Sport	Aston Martin Vantage GT3	22	(United Kingdom) Devon Modell	2
(United Kingdom) TF Sport	Aston Martin Vantage GT3	34	(United Kingdom) Euan Hankey	All
(United Kingdom) TF Sport	Aston Martin Vantage GT3	34	(Turkey) Salih Yoluç	All
(United Kingdom) FF Corse	Ferrari 488 GT3	25	(United Kingdom) Ivor Dunbar	All
(United Kingdom) FF Corse	Ferrari 488 GT3	25	(United Kingdom) Johnny Mowlem	All
(France) Classic & Modern Racing	Ferrari 458 Italia GT3	26	(France) Nicolas Misslin	1–3
(France) Classic & Modern Racing	Ferrari 458 Italia GT3	26	(France) Matthieu Vaxivière	1–3
(France) Classic & Modern Racing	Ferrari 458 Italia GT3	26	(France) Soheil Ayari	4
(France) Classic & Modern Racing	Ferrari 458 Italia GT3	26	(France) Nicolas Tardif	4
(France) Classic & Modern Racing	Ferrari 458 Italia GT3	26	(France) Éric Cayrolle	5
(France) Classic & Modern Racing	Ferrari 458 Italia GT3	26	(France) Arno Santamato	5
(Belgium) Delahaye Racing Team	Porsche 997 GT3 R	28	(France) Pierre-Étienne Bordet	2
(Belgium) Delahaye Racing Team	Porsche 997 GT3 R	28	(France) Alexandre Viron	2
(France) IDEC Sport Racing	Mercedes-AMG GT3	37	(France) Patrice Lafargue	2
(France) IDEC Sport Racing	Mercedes-AMG GT3	37	(France) Paul Lafargue	2
(Luxembourg) DKR Engineering	BMW Z4 GT3	44	(Netherlands) Niels Bouwhuis	2
(Luxembourg) DKR Engineering	BMW Z4 GT3	44	(Netherlands) Jan Storm	2
(France) Larbre Compétition	Mercedes-Benz SLS AMG GT3	50	(France) Franck Labescat	2
(France) Larbre Compétition	Mercedes-Benz SLS AMG GT3	50	(France) Christian Philippon	2
(United Kingdom) Barwell Motorsport	Lamborghini Huracán GT3	66	(United Kingdom) James Cottingham	2
(United Kingdom) Barwell Motorsport	Lamborghini Huracán GT3	66	(United Kingdom) Joe Twyman	2
(United Kingdom) Barwell Motorsport	Lamborghini Huracán GT3	66	(United Kingdom) Richard Abra	4–5
(United Kingdom) Barwell Motorsport	Lamborghini Huracán GT3	66	(United Kingdom) Mark Poole	4–5
(Russia) SMP Racing	Ferrari 488 GT3	72	(Russia) Aleksey Basov	3–6
(Russia) SMP Racing	Ferrari 488 GT3	72	(Russia) Viktor Shaytar	3–6
(United Kingdom) Optimum Motorsport	Audi R8 LMS	75	(United Kingdom) Flick Haigh	4
(United Kingdom) Optimum Motorsport	Audi R8 LMS	75	(United Kingdom) Joe Osborne	4
(Netherlands) Mentos Racing	Porsche 911 GT3 R	88	(Norway) Egidio Perfetti	All
(Netherlands) Mentos Racing	Porsche 911 GT3 R	88	(Austria) Klaus Bachler	1–3, 5–6
(Netherlands) Mentos Racing	Porsche 911 GT3 R	88	(United Kingdom) Ben Barker	4
(Belgium) Autoclub Excelsior	Aston Martin Vantage GT3	90	(Belgium) Michael Schmetz	5
(Belgium) Autoclub Excelsior	Aston Martin Vantage GT3	90	(Belgium) Tim Verbergt	5

== Race results ==
Rnd.	Circuit	Pole position	Race winner
1	(Italy) Imola	(Italy) No. 7 BMS Scuderia Italia	(United Kingdom) No. 34 TF Sport
1	(Italy) Imola	(Italy) Matteo Cressoni (Italy) Luigi Lucchini	(United Kingdom) Euan Hankey (Turkey) Salih Yoluç
2	(France) Le Mans (report)	GT3: (Netherlands) No. 88 Mentos Racing	GT3: (Italy) No. 57 AF Corse
2	(France) Le Mans (report)	(Austria) Klaus Bachler (Norway) Egidio Perfetti	(Russia) Aleksey Basov (Russia) Viktor Shaytar
2	(France) Le Mans (report)	LMP3: (United States) No. 2 United Autosports	LMP3: (China) No. 85 DC Racing
2	(France) Le Mans (report)	(United Kingdom) Martin Brundle (United Kingdom) Christian England	(France) Alexandre Cougnaud (France) Thomas Laurent
3	(Austria) Red Bull Ring	(Russia) No. 72 SMP Racing	(Russia) No. 72 SMP Racing
3	(Austria) Red Bull Ring	(Russia) Aleksey Basov (Russia) Viktor Shaytar	(Russia) Aleksey Basov (Russia) Viktor Shaytar
4	(France) Paul Ricard	(Russia) No. 72 SMP Racing	(Russia) No. 72 SMP Racing
4	(France) Paul Ricard	(Russia) Aleksey Basov (Russia) Viktor Shaytar	(Russia) Aleksey Basov (Russia) Viktor Shaytar
5	(Belgium) Spa	(Russia) No. 72 SMP Racing	(Russia) No. 72 SMP Racing
5	(Belgium) Spa	(Russia) Aleksey Basov (Russia) Viktor Shaytar	(Russia) Aleksey Basov (Russia) Viktor Shaytar
6	(Portugal) Estoril	(Netherlands) No. 88 Mentos Racing	(United Kingdom) No. 34 TF Sport
6	(Portugal) Estoril	(Austria) Klaus Bachler (Norway) Egidio Perfetti	(United Kingdom) Euan Hankey (Turkey) Salih Yoluç

=== Driver's championships (top-5) ===
Pos.	Driver	Team	IMO (Italy)	LM (France)	RBR (Austria)	LEC (France)	SPA (Belgium)	EST (Portugal)	Total
1	(Russia) Aleksey Basov	(Russia) SMP Racing		1	**1**	**1**	**1**	2	121
1	(Russia) Viktor Shaytar	(Russia) SMP Racing		1	**1**	**1**	**1**	2	121
2	(United Kingdom) Euan Hankey	(United Kingdom) TF Sport	1	4	3	3	3	1	107
2	(Turkey) Salih Yoluç	(United Kingdom) TF Sport	1	4	3	3	3	1	107
3	(Norway) Egidio Perfetti	(Netherlands) Mentos Racing	DNF	**3**	2	2	2	**3**	86
4	(Austria) Klaus Bachler	(Netherlands) Mentos Racing	**Ret**	**3**	2		2	**3**	68
5	(United Kingdom) Adrian Quaife-Hobbs	(China) FFF Racing Team by ACM	2	2	DNS	Ret	5	Ret	46
5	(Japan) Hiroshi Hamaguchi	(China) FFF Racing Team by ACM	2	2	DNS	Ret	5	Ret	46

Key
Colour	Result
Gold	Race winner
Silver	2nd place
Bronze	3rd place
Green	Points finish
Blue	Non-points finish
Blue	Non-classified finish (NC)
Purple	Did not finish (Ret)
Black	Disqualified (DSQ)
Black	Excluded (EX)
White	Did not start (DNS)
White	Race cancelled (C)
White	Withdrew (WD)
Blank	Did not participate

**Bold** – Pole

=== Teams Championship (top-5) ===
Pos.	Team	Car	IMO (Italy)	LM (France)	RBR (Austria)	LEC (France)	SPA (Belgium)	EST (Portugal)	Total
1	(United Kingdom) No. 34 TF Sport	Aston Martin Vantage GT3	1	4	3	3	3	1	107
2	(Russia) No. 72 SMP Racing	Ferrari 488 GT3			**1**	**1**	**1**	2	96
3	(Netherlands) No. 88 Mentos Racing	Porsche 911 GT3 R	DNF	**3**	2	2	2	**3**	86
4	(China) No. 55 FFF Racing Team by ACM	McLaren 650S GT3	2	2	DNS	Ret	5	Ret	46
5	(Italy) No. 8 Villorba Corse	Ferrari 458 Italia GT3	7	10		5	6	5	35

Key
Colour	Result
Gold	Race winner
Silver	2nd place
Bronze	3rd place
Green	Points finish
Blue	Non-points finish
Blue	Non-classified finish (NC)
Purple	Did not finish (Ret)
Black	Disqualified (DSQ)
Black	Excluded (EX)
White	Did not start (DNS)
White	Race cancelled (C)
White	Withdrew (WD)
Blank	Did not participate

**Bold** – Pole
