= Ralf Martin =

German racing driver

Ralf Martin (born 10 July 1967) is a German racing driver, who has most famously competed in the European Touring Car Cup, as well as the ADAC Procar Series also. He is a former ETCC Super 1600 champion, having won in 2008.

== Career ==
In 2003 and 2007, Martin was champion in Ford Fiesta Cup Germany.

In 2008, Martin became the second champion in ETCC Super 1600, that was ensured by winning both races in the class that weekend. He maintains a 100% winning record with this being his only year in the series.
