= Viktor Shaytar =

Russian racing driver (born 1983)

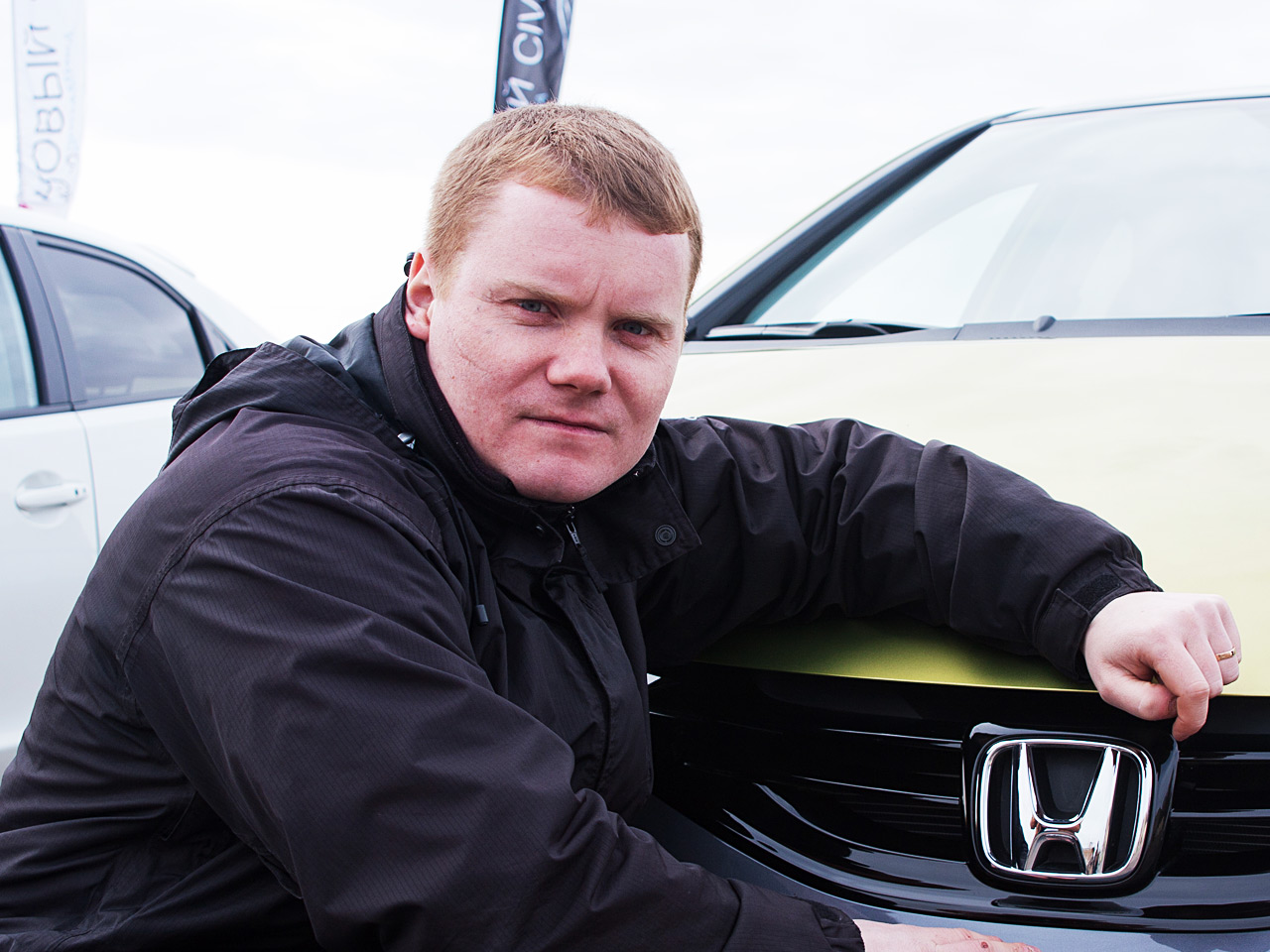
- Shaytar in 2012.
- Nationality: (Russia) Russian
- Born: Viktor Viktorovich Shaytar; 13 February 1983 (age 43) Moscow, Russian SFSR, Soviet Union

European Le Mans Series - LMP2 career
- Debut season: 2015
- Current team: SMP Racing
- Categorisation: FIA Bronze (until 2013); FIA Silver (2014–)
- Car number: 35
- Starts: 2
- Wins: 0
- Poles: 0
- Fastest laps: 0
- Best finish: 7th in 2015

Previous series
- 2013, 17 2016 2014-16 2014 2013 2011-2012 2009 2008 2008 2002-07: Blancpain GT Series Endurance Cup; GT3 Le Mans Cup; FIA World Endurance Championship; European Le Mans Series - GTE; European Le Mans Series - GTC; Legends Russia; German Formula Three Championship; Finnish Formula Three Championship; Russian Formula Three Championship; Russian Formula 1600 Championship

Championship titles
- 2016 2015 2014 2013 2002: GT3 Le Mans Cup; FIA WEC - LMGTE Am; European Le Mans Series - GTE; European Le Mans Series - GTC; Russian Formula 1600 Championship

24 Hours of Le Mans career
- Years: 2014-2017
- Teams: SMP Racing
- Best finish: 7th (2016)
- Class wins: 1 (2015)

Viktor Viktorovich Shaytar (Russian: Ви́ктор Ви́кторович Шайта́р, IPA: [ˈvʲiktər ˈvʲiktərəvʲɪtɕ ʂəjˈtar]; born 13 February 1983) is a Russian racing driver. He is a current member of the SMP Racing driver programme.

== Career ==
=== Russian Formula 1600 Championship ===
Born in Moscow, Shaytar began racing in his native Russia in 2002, winning the Russian Formula 1600 Championship from the first attempt. Shaytar remained in the championship until 2007, but wasn't able to repeat his success, finishing as runner-up in 2007.

=== Formula Three ===
Shaytar moved to the Formula Three class in 2008, racing in the Finnish and Russian Formula Three Championship for the Artline Engineering. He finished second in the standings of the Finnish championship and third in the standings of the Russian championship. In 2009, he raced in the Oschersleben round of the Trophy Class of the German Formula Three Championship.

=== Legends Russia ===
After one-year hiatus, Shaytar returned to racing in 2011, competing in the Russian Legends series. He stayed in the series for 2012 and won seven from twelve races.

=== Sportscar racing ===
In 2013, Shaytar made his sports car racing debut, participating in the 2013 Blancpain Endurance Series with SMP Racing (also he became part of SMP Racing programme). He and Kirill Ladygin finished as runner-up in the Pro-Am standings after winning the finale at Nürburgring. He also raced with Fabio Babini and Kirill Ladygin in the GTC class of the 2013 European Le Mans Series. Despite missing opening round, they won all four races that they competed in, winning the category title.

For the next year, Shaytar switched to the LM GTE category of the European Le Mans Series, joining Andrea Bertolini and Sergey Zlobin. They won two races on the way to LM GTE class win. He also raced with Kirill and Anton Ladygin in the LMP2 Class of the 2014 FIA World Endurance Championship. Shaytar raced in the LMGTE Am class of the 2014 24 Hours of Le Mans. But he crashed on the lap 196, retiring his Ferrari 458 Italia GT2.

In 2015, Shaytar moved to the LMGTE Am class of the 2015 FIA World Endurance Championship, Andrea Bertolini and Aleksey Basov joined him in the team. His squad won 2015 24 Hours of Le Mans in the LMGTE Am category. Shaytar's car was also victorious at Nürburgring and Austin. That consistency lead to the title in the LMGTE Am class.

After two races in the LMP2 class of the 2015 European Le Mans Series with BR Engineering BR01 prototype, Shaytar joined Vitaly Petrov and Kirill Ladygin in the LMP2 Class of the 2016 FIA World Endurance Championship. They had podium in the LMP2 Class of the 2016 24 Hours of Le Mans, which was their only highlight during the season. He also raced with Aleksey Basov in the 2016 GT3 Le Mans Cup and won the title after three race wins.

Shaytar returned to the Blancpain GT Series Endurance Cup in 2017, teaming up with Miguel Molina and Davide Rigon in the Pro class. Their best result was during 1000 km Paul Ricard, when they finished on podium behind the race winners Bentley M-Sport, leading to the fourth in the season standings. He again competed in the LMP2 class in the 2017 24 Hours of Le Mans alongside Mikhail Aleshin and Sergey Sirotkin.

For 2018, Shaytar raced in the LMP2 class of the 2018 European Le Mans Series and in the 2018 24 Hours of Le Mans.

== Racing record ==
=== Career summary ===
Season	Series	Team	Races	Wins	Poles	F/Laps	Podiums	Points	Position
2002	Russian Formula 1600 Championship	Formula Z	8	3	N/A	N/A	6	132	1st
2003	Russian Formula 1600 Championship	Formula Z	12	0	0	0	0	32	7th
2004	Russian Formula 1600 Championship	Unir Art-Line	14	1	0	0	1	59	6th
2005	Russian Formula 1600 Championship	Artline Engineering	9	0	0	0	0	23	7th
2006	Russian Formula 1600 Championship	Sitronics Racing	10	0	0	0	4	51	3rd
2007	Russian Formula 1600 Championship	Artline Engineering	14	5	0	2	9	181	2nd
2008	Russian Formula Three Championship	Artline Engineering	12	0	0	2	7	97.5	3rd
2008	Finnish Formula Three Championship	Artline Engineering	12	7	3	10	10	181	2nd
2008	North European Zone Formula 3 Cup	Artline Engineering	2	0	0	0	2	40	2nd
2009	German Formula 3 Championship	Stromos Art-Line	2	0	0	0	0	10	9th
2011	Legends Russia	OLSA	6	2	N/A	2	4	598	12th
2012	Legends Russia	N/A	12	7	0	7	11	N/A	N/A
2012	Legends Georgia	Aimol Racing	4	3	0	3	4	55	4th
2013	European Le Mans Series - GTC	SMP Racing	4	4	0	0	4	100	1st
2013	Blancpain Endurance Series - Pro-Am	SMP Racing	5	1	0	0	2	63	2nd
2014	European Le Mans Series - GTE	SMP Racing	5	2	0	0	3	85	1st
2014	FIA World Endurance Championship - LMP2	SMP Racing	7	0	0	0	1	60	7th
2014	24 Hours of Le Mans - GTE Am	SMP Racing	1	0	0	0	0	N/A	DNF
2015	FIA World Endurance Championship - GTE Am	SMP Racing	8	3	2	1	6	165	1st
2015	24 Hours of Le Mans - GTE Am	SMP Racing	1	1	0	0	1	N/A	1st
2015	European Le Mans Series - LMP2	AF Racing	2	0	0	0	2	33	7th
2015	Ferrari Challenge Europe - Trofeo Pirelli	AF Corse	2	0	0	0	2	28	9th
2016	GT3 Le Mans Cup	AF Corse	1	1	0	0	1	121	1st
2016	GT3 Le Mans Cup	SMP Racing	4	3	3	1	4	121	1st
2016	FIA World Endurance Championship - LMP2	SMP Racing	9	0	0	0	1	63	9th
2016	IMSA SportsCar Championship - GTLM	SMP Racing	1	0	0	0	0	22	28th
2016	24 Hours of Le Mans - LMP2	SMP Racing	1	0	0	0	1	N/A	3rd
2017	Blancpain GT Series Endurance Cup	SMP Racing	5	0	0	0	1	46	4th
2017	Intercontinental GT Challenge	SMP Racing	1	0	0	0	0	0	NC
2017	24 Hours of Le Mans - LMP2	SMP Racing	1	0	0	0	0	N/A	16th
2018	European Le Mans Series - LMP2	SMP Racing	4	0	0	0	0	6	22nd
2018	24 Hours of Le Mans - LMP2	SMP Racing	1	0	0	0	0	N/A	10th
2018	Lamborghini Super Trofeo World Final - Pro	Nefis by Target Racing	2	0	0	0	0	11	7th
2020	Ligier European Series - JS2 R	MV2S Racing	5	0	3	4	0	30	14th
2021	24H GT Series - GT3	Team Zakspeed							
2022	24H GT Series - GT3	CapitalRT-Yadro							
2023-24	Middle East Trophy - GT3	Proton Huber Competition							
2024-25	Asian Le Mans Series - GT	Winward Racing	6	0	0	0	1	33	9th
2025	Middle East Trophy - GT3	Winward Racing	2	0	0	0	0	26	4th
2026	Russian Circuit Racing Series - GT4	YADRO Motorsport							

=== 24 Hours of Le Mans results ===
Year	Team	Co-Drivers	Car	Class	Laps	Pos.	Class Pos.
2014	(Russia) SMP Racing	(Russia) Aleksey Basov (Italy) Andrea Bertolini	Ferrari 458 Italia GTC	GTE; Am	196	DNF	DNF
2015	(Russia) SMP Racing	(Russia) Aleksey Basov (Italy) Andrea Bertolini	Ferrari 458 Italia GTC	GTE; Am	332	20th	1st
2016	(Russia) SMP Racing	(Russia) Kirill Ladygin (Russia) Vitaly Petrov	BR Engineering BR01-Nissan	LMP2	353	7th	3rd
2017	(Russia) SMP Racing	(Russia) Mikhail Aleshin (Russia) Sergey Sirotkin	Dallara P217-Gibson	LMP2	330	33rd	16th
2018	(Russia) SMP Racing	(United Kingdom) Harrison Newey (France) Norman Nato	Dallara P217-Gibson	LMP2	345	14th	10th

Sporting positions
Preceded by Dmitriy Shcheglov	Russian Formula 1600 Champion; 2002	Succeeded by Alexander Tyuryumin
Preceded by None	European Le Mans Series; GTC Class Champion; 2013; With: Fabio Babini & Kirill Ladygin	Succeeded by Olivier Beretta; Anton Ladygin; Devi Markozov
Preceded by Matt Griffin; Johnny Mowlem	European Le Mans Series; GTE Class Champion; 2014; With: Andrea Bertolini & Sergey Zlobin	Succeeded by Johnny Laursen; Mikkel Mac; Andrea Rizzoli
Preceded by David Heinemeier Hansson; Kristian Poulsen	FIA World Endurance; LMGTE Am Class Champion; 2015; With: Aleksey Basov & Andrea Bertolini	Succeeded by Rui Águas; Emmanuel Collard; François Perrodo
Preceded by David Heinemeier Hansson; Kristian Poulsen; Nicki Thiim	24 Hours of Le Mans; LMGTE Am Class winner 2015; With: Aleksey Basov & Andrea Bertolini	Succeeded by Townsend Bell; Jeff Segal; Bill Sweedler
Preceded by None	Michelin Le Mans Cup winner 2016; With: Aleksey Basov	Succeeded by Fabio Babini; Emanuele Busnelli
