= Aleksandr Lvov =

Russian racing driver

Aleksandr Mikhailovich Lvov (Russian: Александр Михайлович Львов; born 27 January 1972 in Leningrad) is a Russian auto racing driver. He is a son of renowned soviet open-wheel driver Mikhail Lvov.

== Career ==
He is twice champion of the Russian Touring Car Championship. First in 2001 with an Opel Astra, and again in 2007 with a Honda Accord. In 2006 he won the Super Production class in the FIA European Touring Car Cup, in a Honda Civic at Estoril.

In 2007 he competed in two rounds of the FIA World Touring Car Championship in a Honda Accord Euro R, alongside fellow Russian Andrey Smetsky for the Golden Motors team. He returned to the WTCC in 2008 for selected rounds, his best placed finish was 16th in race two at Valencia.

=== Complete World Touring Car Championship results ===
(key) (Races in bold indicate pole position) (Races in italics indicate fastest lap)

Year	Team	Car	1	2	3	4	5	6	7	8	9	10	11	12	13	14	15	16	17	18	19	20	21	22	23	24	DC	Points
2007	Golden Motors	Honda Accord Euro R	BRA; 1	BRA; 2	NED; 1	NED; 2	ESP; 1	ESP; 2	FRA; 1	FRA; 2	CZE; 1	CZE; 2	POR; 1	POR; 2	SWE; 1; 24	SWE; 2; 26	GER; 1	GER; 2	GBR; 1	GBR; 2	ITA; 1	ITA; 2	MAC; 1	MAC; 2			NC	0
2008	Golden Motors	Honda Accord Euro R	BRA; 1	BRA; 2	MEX; 1	MEX; 2	ESP; 1; 19	ESP; 2; 16	FRA; 1	FRA; 2	CZE; 1; 23	CZE; 2; 20	POR; 1	POR; 2	GBR; 1	GBR; 2	GER; 1	GER; 2	EUR; 1	EUR; 2	ITA; 1	ITA; 2	JPN; 1	JPN; 2	MAC; 1	MAC; 2	NC	0

Sporting positions
Preceded by Mikhail Ukhov	Russian Circuit Racing Series; Champion; 2001	Succeeded by Grigoriy Komarov
Preceded by Vladimir Labazov	Russian Circuit Racing Series; Champion; 2007	Succeeded by Aleksey Basov
