= Aleksey Basov =

Russian racing driver

- Nationality: (Russia) Russian
- Born: Aleksey Mikhailovich Basov; 22 April 1977 (age 49) Kaliningrad, Soviet Union

Russian Circuit Racing Series career
- Debut season: 2017
- Current team: SMP Racing Russia
- Categorisation: FIA Bronze (until 2016, 2027–); FIA Silver (2017–2026)
- Car number: 7
- Starts: 14
- Wins: 0
- Poles: 0
- Fastest laps: 0
- Best finish: 10th in 2017

Previous series
- 2016 2015 2014 2013 2012 2010-11 2009 2007-08 2007 2003-06: GT3 Le Mans Cup; FIA World Endurance Championship; European Le Mans Series - GTC; Blancpain Endurance Series; Ferrari Challenge Europe; Italian GT Championship; Ukrainian Circuit Racing Championship; Russian Touring Car Championship; European Touring Car Cup; Lada Cup Russia

Championship titles
- 2016 2015 2012 2009 2008 2007 2007: GT3 Le Mans Cup; FIA WEC - LMGTE Am; Ferrari Challenge Europe — Coppa Shell; UCRC — Touring Light; Russian Touring Car Championship; RCRS - Super Production; European Touring Car Cup

24 Hours of Le Mans career
- Years: 2014-2015
- Teams: SMP Racing
- Best finish: 20th (2015)
- Class wins: 1 (2015)

Aleksey Mikhailovich Basov (Russian: Алексе́й Миха́йлович Ба́сов, IPA: [ɐlʲɪkˈsʲej mʲɪˈxajləvʲɪdʑ ˈbasəf]; born 22 April 1977) is a Russian former racing driver. He is a current member of the SMP Racing driver programme.

== Career ==
=== Early years ===
Born in Kaliningrad, Basov began racing in his native Russia in 1995, finishing as runner-up in the cross championship of Moscow Oblast. His highlight was third place in the 2005 Lada Cup Russia.

=== Russian Circuit Racing Series and first steps in Europe ===
In 2007, Basov moved to the Super Production class of the Russian Circuit Racing Series, driving Honda Civic Type-R for Rostokino-Lada team. He won the category after eight race wins. Also he won the two-race 2007 European Touring Car Cup in the same Super Production class.

For the next year, Basov moved into the main class — Touring, competing for the Red Wings team. He clinched the championship title. In 2009, he moved to the Ukrainian Touring Car Championship and won the Light category after winning six from eight races.

After two races behind the wheel of De Lorenzi Racing's Porsche 997 in the Italian GT Championship, Basov switched to Petricorse Motorsport for 2011, driving the same model of the car. He won one race, finishing twelfth at the end of the season.

For 2012, Basov moved to the Ferrari Challenge Europe, where he became a champion of the Coppa Shell category after seven wins in 16 races.

=== SMP Racing period ===
In 2013, Basov became part of the SMP Racing programme, joining their squad in the Blancpain Endurance Series. He finished 19th in the Pro-Am Cup class and 26th in the Pro Cup class. He also raced in the Algarve round of the GTS category in the 2013 International GT Open, winning the first race of the round.

For the next year, Basov switched to the GTC category of the European Le Mans Series, joining Kirill Ladygin and Luca Persiani. They won race on the Red Bull Ring. Basov also raced in the LMGTE Am class of the 2014 24 Hours of Le Mans, alongside Andrea Bertolini and Viktor Shaytar. But the race was ended, after Shaytar crashed their Ferrari 458 Italia GT2.

In 2015, Basov moved to the LMGTE Am class of the 2015 FIA World Endurance Championship, continuing with Bertolini and Shaytar. His squad won 2015 24 Hours of Le Mans in the LMGTE Am category. Also Basov's car was victorious at Nürburgring and Austin. That consistency lead to the title in the LMGTE Am class.

In 2016, Basov raced with Shaytar in the 2016 GT3 Le Mans Cup and won the title after three race wins.

Shaytar returned to the Russian Circuit Racing Series in 2017, driving Volkswagen Polo R2 Mk5 in the Touring Light category. He ended the season tenth with three podium finishes.

== Racing record ==
=== Career summary ===
Season	Series	Team	Races	Wins	Poles	F/Laps	Podiums	Points	Position
2003	Lada Cup Russia	Rostokino-Lada	N/A	N/A	N/A	N/A	N/A	N/A	23rd
2004	Lada Cup Russia	Rostokino-Lada	N/A	N/A	N/A	N/A	N/A	N/A	22nd
2005	Lada Cup Russia	Rostokino-Lada	N/A	N/A	N/A	N/A	N/A	N/A	3rd
2006	Lada Cup Russia	Rostokino-Lada	N/A	N/A	N/A	N/A	N/A	N/A	10th
2006	Honda Civic Cup Russia	Rostokino-Lada	N/A	N/A	N/A	N/A	N/A	N/A	3rd
2007	Russian Touring Car Championship - Super Production	Rostokino-Lada	N/A	8	N/A	N/A	N/A	N/A	1st
2007	European Touring Car Cup - Super Production	Rostokino-Lada	2	2	0	1	2	20	2nd
2008	Russian Touring Car Championship	Rostokino-Lada	N/A	8	N/A	N/A	N/A	N/A	1st
2009	Ukrainian Circuit Racing Championship - Touring Light	N/A	8	6	N/A	N/A	8	58	1st
2010	Italian GT Championship - GT3	De Lorenzi Racing	2	0	0	0	0	9	28th
2011	Italian GT Championship - GT Cup	Petricorse Motorsport	16	1	0	0	2	71	12th
2012	Ferrari Challenge Europe - Coppa Shell	Ferrari Moscow	16	7	7	5	13	265	1st
2012	FIA GT3 European Championship	Esta Motorsports	2	0	0	0	1	20	13th
2013	Blancpain Endurance Series - Pro	SMP Racing	3	0	0	0	0	10	26th
2013	Blancpain Endurance Series - Pro-Am	SMP Racing	1	0	0	0	0	24	19th
2013	International GT Open - GTS	Esta Motorsports	2	1	0	0	1	10	26th
2014	European Le Mans Series - GTC	SMP Racing	5	1	0	0	2	100	3rd
2015	FIA World Endurance Championship - LMGTE Am	SMP Racing	8	3	2	0	6	165	1st
2016	GT3 Le Mans Cup	SMP Racing	8	3	2	0	6	165	1st
2017	Russian Circuit Racing Series	SMP Racing Russia	14	0	0	0	3	120	10th

=== 24 Hours of Le Mans results ===
Year	Team	Co-Drivers	Car	Class	Laps	Pos.	Class Pos.
2014	(Russia) SMP Racing	(Italy) Andrea Bertolini (Russia) Viktor Shaytar	Ferrari 458 Italia GTC	GTE; Am	196	DNF	DNF
2015	(Russia) SMP Racing	(Italy) Andrea Bertolini (Russia) Viktor Shaytar	Ferrari 458 Italia GTC	GTE; Am	332	20th	1st

Sporting positions
Preceded by Vladimir Cherevan	Russian Circuit Racing Series; Super Production Champion; 2007	Succeeded by Pavel Fedorov
Preceded by Aleksandr Lvov	Russian Circuit Racing Series; Champion; 2008	Succeeded by Vladimir Strelchenko
Preceded by David Heinemeier Hansson; Kristian Poulsen	FIA World Endurance; LMGTE Am Class Champion; 2015; With: Andrea Bertolini & Viktor Shaytar	Succeeded by Rui Águas; Emmanuel Collard; François Perrodo
Preceded by David Heinemeier Hansson; Kristian Poulsen; Nicki Thiim	24 Hours of Le Mans; LMGTE Am Class winner 2015; With: Andrea Bertolini & Viktor Shaytar	Succeeded by Townsend Bell; Jeff Segal; Bill Sweedler
Preceded by None	Michelin Le Mans Cup winner 2016; With: Viktor Shaytar	Succeeded by Fabio Babini; Emanuele Busnelli
