= SMP Racing =

Russian endurance racing team, 2012–2022

- Founded: 2013
- Nation: Russia
- Founder(s): Boris Rotenberg
- Base: Moscow, Russia
- Website: www.smpracing.ru

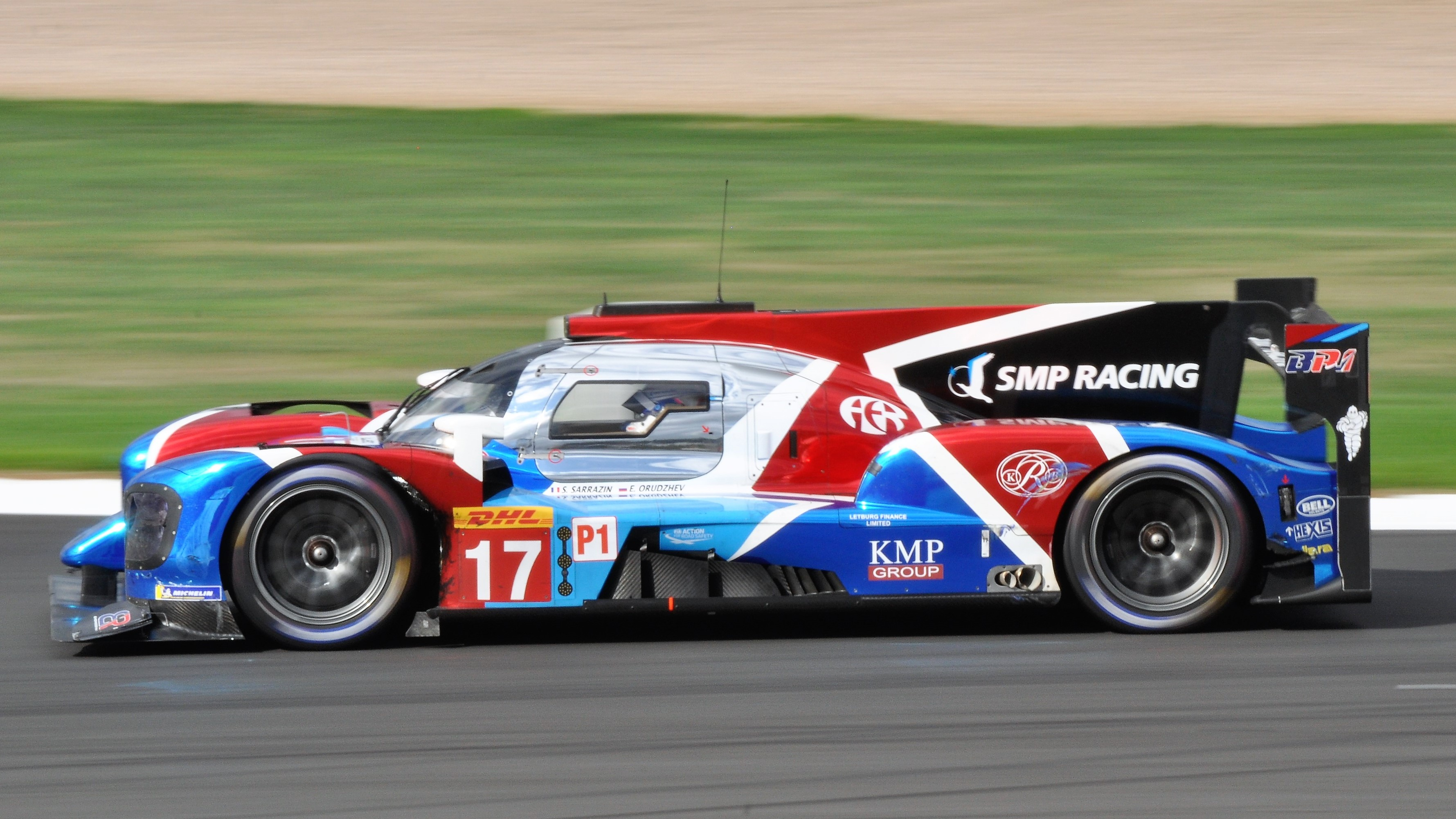
BR Engineering BR1 of SMP Racing

SMP Racing is a Russian racing team and driver academy mostly known for competing in the FIA World Endurance Championship, FIA Formula 2 Championship and FIA Formula 3 Championship with the goal of training and unveiling new talents from Russia. The team was founded in 2013 by Boris Rotenberg, co-founder of the SMP Bank of Russia.

== History ==
SMP Racing is a prominent Russian motor racing team and driver development program founded in 2013 by Boris Rotenberg, co-founder of SMP Bank. The organization was created to discover and train Russian racing talent, guiding drivers through a structured "pyramid" from domestic karting to top-tier international series like Formula 1 and the 24 Hours of Le Mans.

The team was founded in 2012 by the Russian oligarch Boris Rotenberg, co-founder of SMP Bank and CEO of Russian race car construction company BR Engineering.

They first competed in the FIA World Endurance Championship with the goal of supporting new talents from Russia and giving them the chance to compete in international motorsport.

=== Boris Rotenberg ===
Born in Saint Petersburg, Russia on 3 January 1957 (age 69), Boris Rotenberg is known as the co-founder of SMP Bank and CEO of the largest construction company for gas pipelines and electrical power supply lines in Russia (StroyGazMontazh).

In 2001 Boris and his brother founded the SMP Bank of Russia, one of the largest banks in Russia.

Boris is the CEO and founder of a race car construction company called BR Engineering. This company created the BR Engineering BR1 and BR Engineering BR01; both cars achieved podiums in their categories at the 24 Hours of Le Mans.

=== Current status ===
On 8 July 2019, SMP announced that it was withdrawing their BR1 LMP1 cars from the 2019–20 WEC season only three weeks ahead of the Prologue pre-season test session. The team said in a statement that it had achieved the best possible results as a privateer LMP1 entry "given the circumstances" after its 3rd place podium result at the 2019 24h of Le Mans ahead of all other privateer entries and only behind two works Toyota TS050 Hybrids. It continued to sponsor the AF Corse GTE Pro cars until the conclusion of the 2019–20 WEC season.

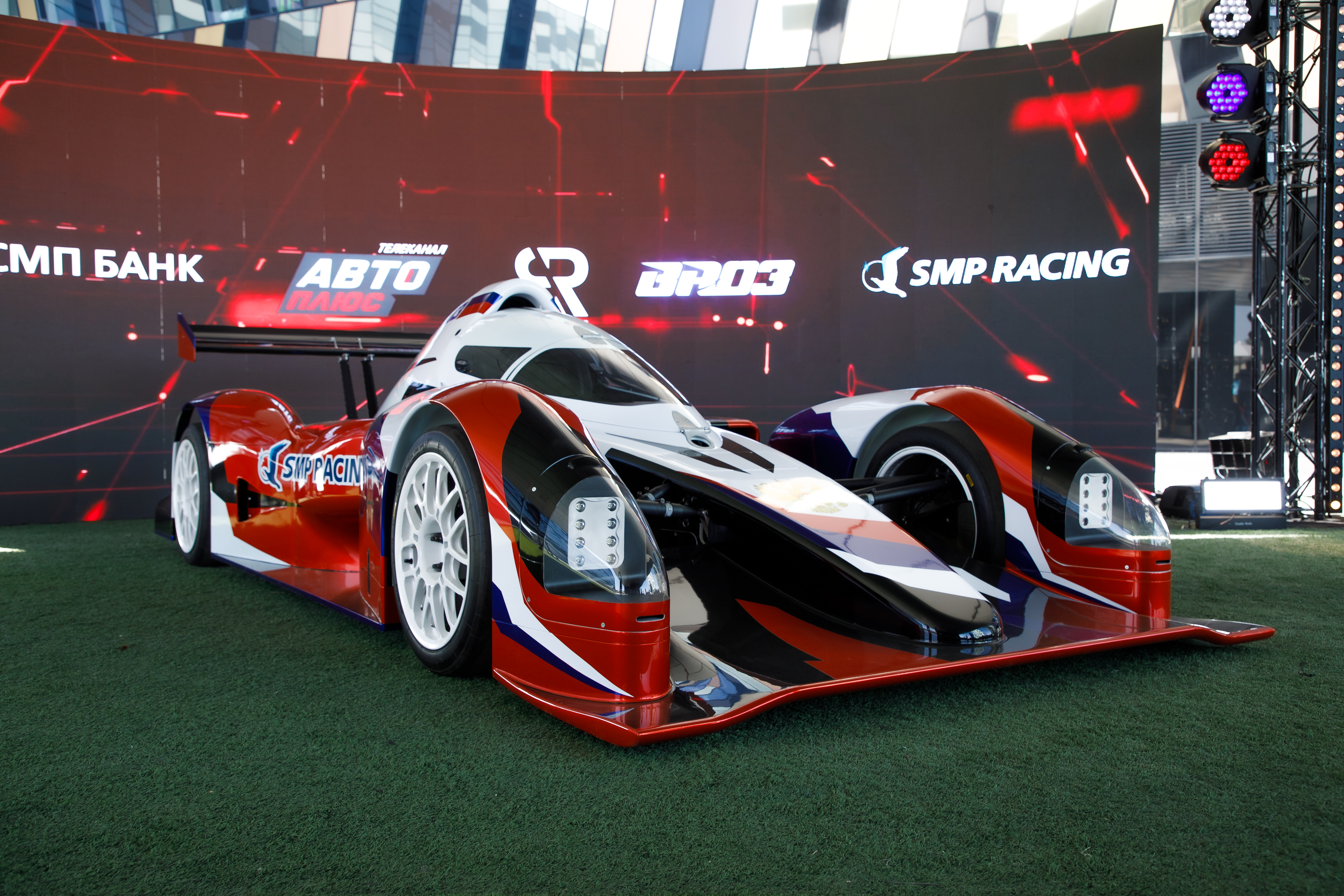
BR Engineering BR03 at launch

In May 2021, SMP and BR Engineering unveiled the BR03, a prototype sportscar intended for national-level endurance racing. It was first raced on-track at an exhibition race at Moscow Raceway in August 2025, and is planned to race as part of a monoclass in the Russian Circuit Racing Series starting in 2026.

The team went quiet across all of their social media accounts, along with a number of other Russian teams at the time which were competing in international motorsports.

The team also announced they would not return to the FIA World Endurance Championship or the European Le Mans Series.

This was expected, due to the FIA announcing new requirements for Russian drivers and teams competing in international motorsport as a response to the Russian invasion of Ukraine.

== Championships ==
=== FIA World Endurance Championship ===
SMP Racing competed in the FIA World Endurance Championship full time between the years of 2014-2016. They made one return for the 2016 24 Hours of Le Mans and returned later for the 2018–19 FIA World Endurance Championship season.

The team were mildly successful throughout their whole time in the series. Their most successful year in the Championship came in 2015, where the team collected 6 podiums, 3 wins, and finished 1st in the LMGTE AM category.

=== 24 Hours of Le Mans ===
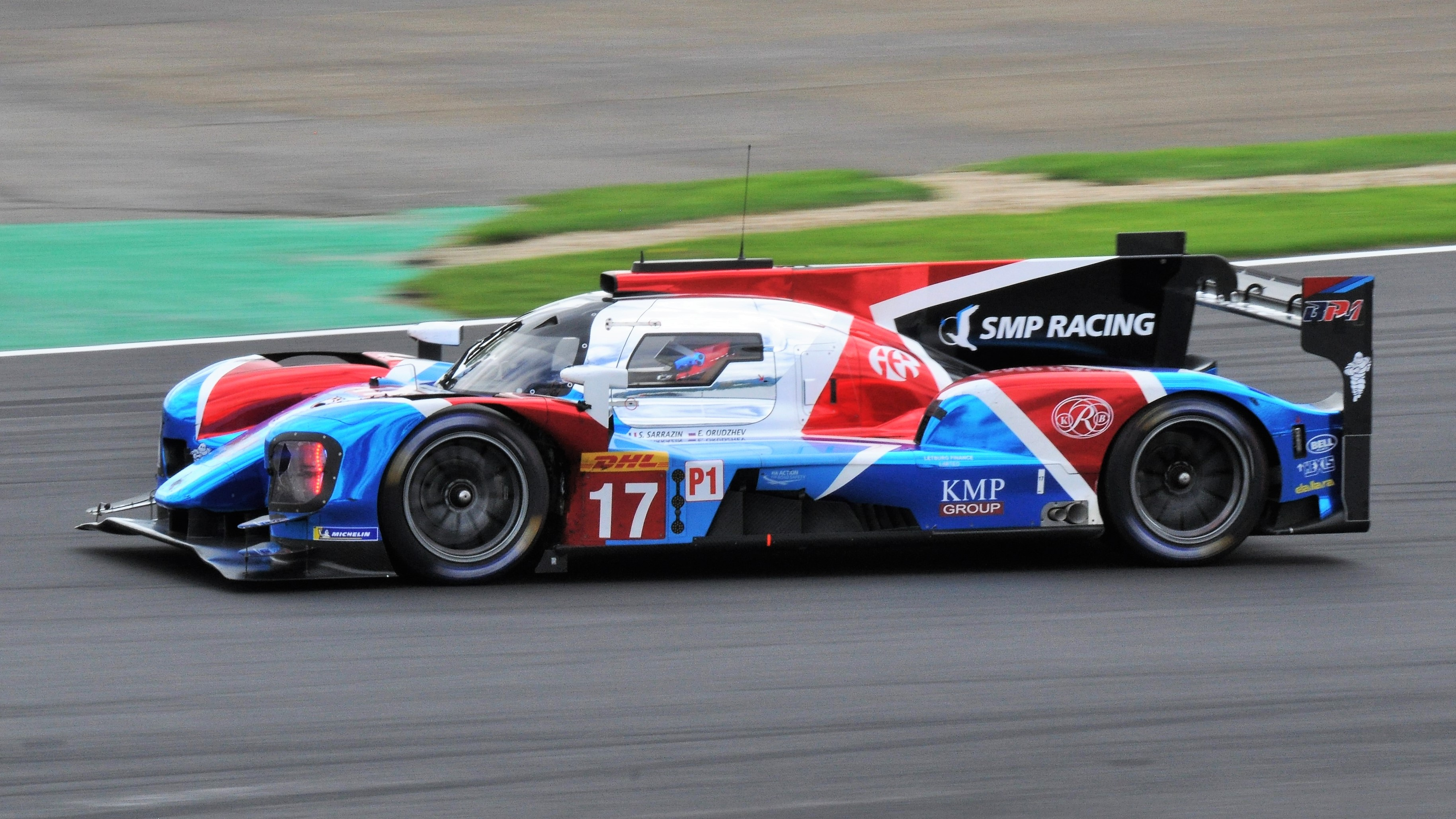
BR1 LMP1 prototype

The team again had another mildly successful career at the 24 Hours of Le Mans by finishing first with Ferrari 458 GT2 in LMGTE category in 2015 and finishing third with BR1 LMP1 prototype in overall category in 2019 only behind two Toyota's, making them the fastest non-factory team.

=== FIA Formula 2 Championship ===
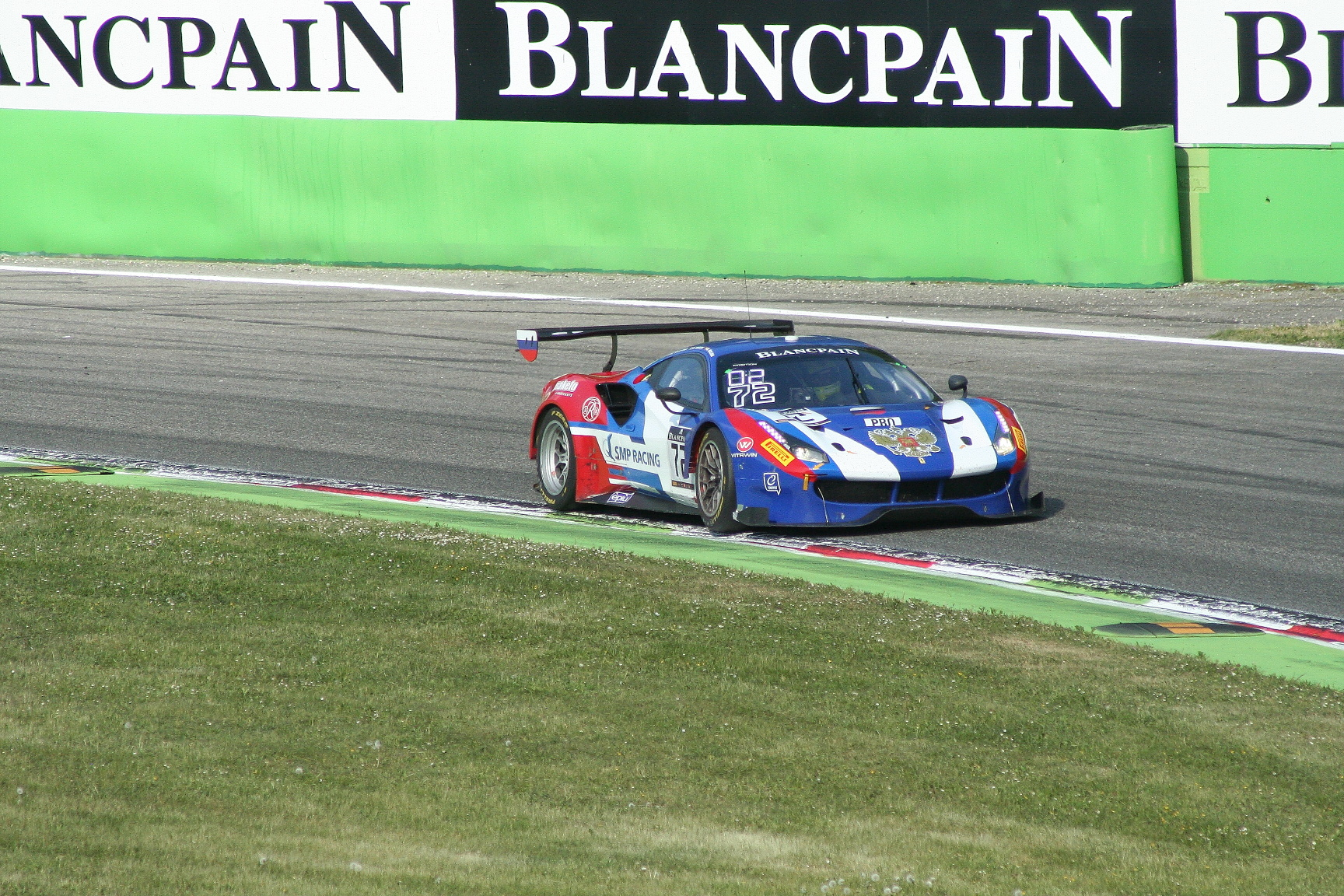
Ferrari 488 GT3 of SMP Racing at Monza

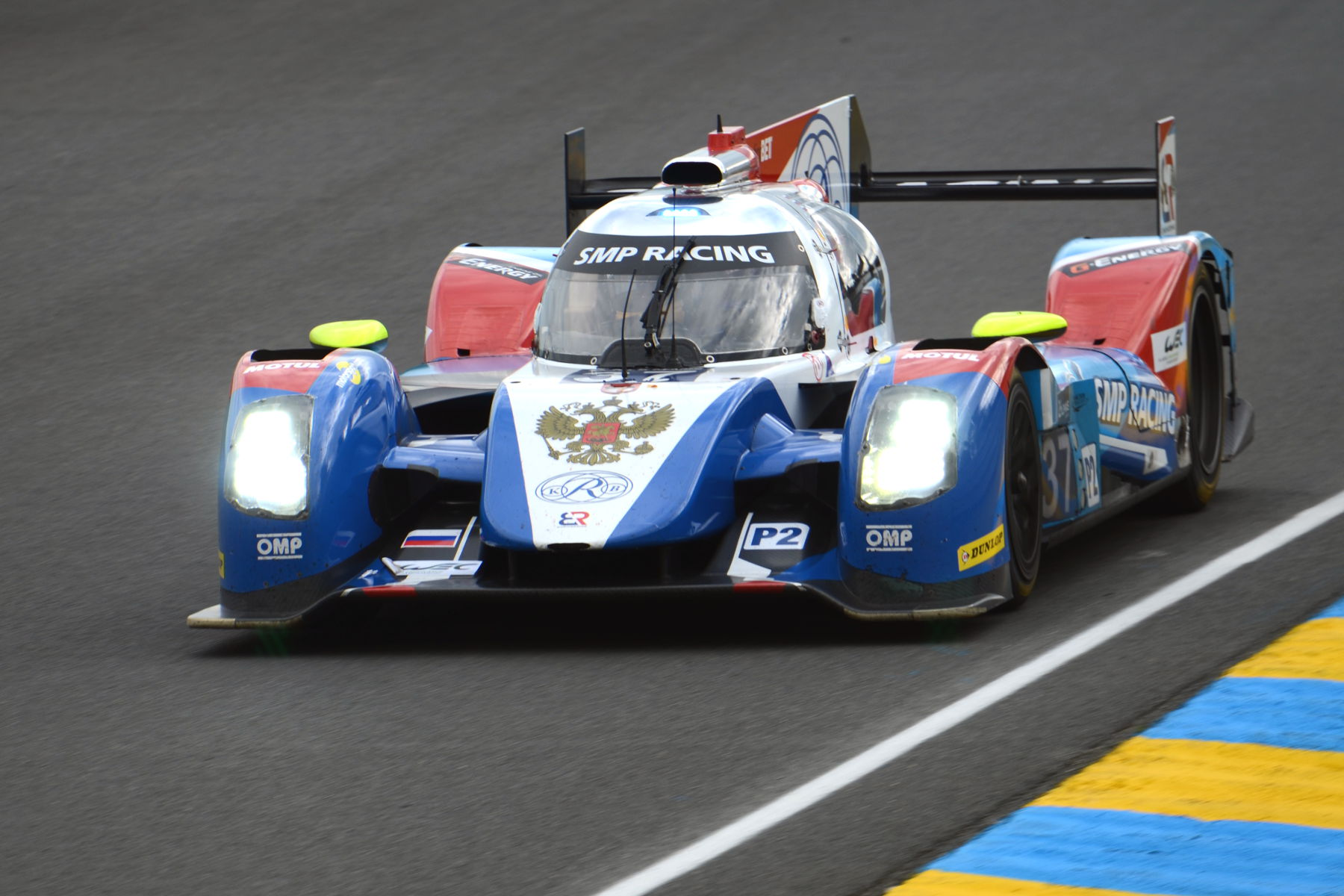
BR Engineering BR01 of SMP Racing at Le Mans

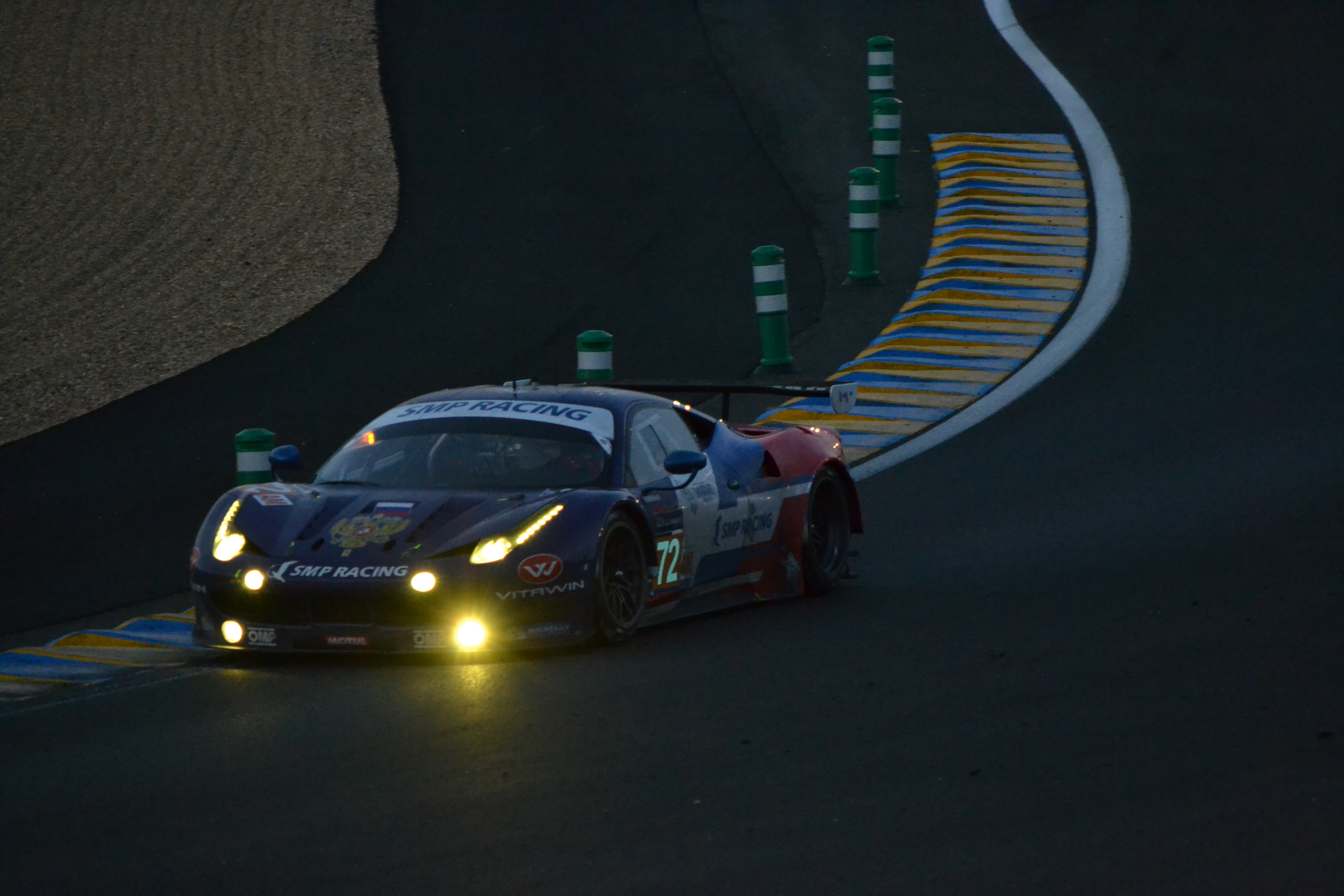
Ferrari 458 Italia GT2 of SMP Racing at Le Mans at night

SMP Racing never had their own team in the FIA Formula 2 Championship. However, they still had a young driver program for young Russian drivers such as Robert Shwartzman and Sergey Sirotkin.

The program was cancelled in May 2022 due to the FIA announcing requirements on Russian drivers competing in international motorsport. These rules were announced as a response to the Russian invasion of Ukraine.

=== Other championships ===
- FIA Formula 1 World Championship
- FIA Formula 3 Championship
- Blancpain GT Series Endurance Cup
- European Drag Racing Championship
- Eurocup Formula Renault
- SMP Formula 4 Championship
- F4 Spanish Championship
- Italian F4 Championship
- CIK-FIA Karting European Championship
- Russian Circuit Racing Series
- Russian Drag Racing Championship
- WSK Super Master Series
- Russian Karting Championship and Cup
- European Le Mans Series
- GP2 Series
- Eurocup Formula Renault 2.0
- SMP F4 Championship

== List of drivers ==
- (Russia) Mikhail Aleshin
- (Russia) Vladimir Atoev
- (Italy) Fabio Babini
- (Russia) Aleksey Basov
- (Russia) Michael Belov
- (Monaco) Olivier Beretta
- (Italy) Andrea Bertolini
- (Italy) Matteo Bobbi
- (Poland) Aleksander Bosak
- (Italy) Gianmaria Bruni
- (United Kingdom) Jenson Button
- (United Kingdom) James Calado
- (Monaco) Stefano Coletti
- (New Zealand) Mitch Evans
- (Brazil) Lucas Foresti
- (Italy) Antonio Fuoco
- (Indonesia) Sean Gelael
- (Italy) Antonio Giovinazzi
- (New Zealand) Brendon Hartley
- (Russia) Matevos Isaakyan
- (Russia) Aleksey Korneev
- (Russia) Kirill Ladygin
- (Finland) Konsta Lappalainen
- (Colombia) Julián Leal
- (Russia) Roman Mavlanov
- (United Kingdom) Michael Meadows
- (France) Nicolas Minassian
- (Spain) Miguel Molina
- (Russia) Daniil Move
- (France) Norman Nato
- (United Kingdom) Harrison Newey
- (Russia) Egor Orudzhev
- (Italy) Luca Persiani
- (Russia) Vitaly Petrov
- (Italy) Alessandro Pier Guidi
- (Italy) Davide Rigon
- (Finland) Mika Salo
- (France) Stéphane Sarrazin
- (Finland) Elias Seppänen
- (Russia) Viktor Shaytar
- (Russia) Robert Shwartzman
- (Russia) Irina Sidorkova
- (Russia) Sergey Sirotkin
- (Russia) Alexander Smolyar
- (Russia) Konstantin Tereshchenko
- (Finland) Nikita Troitskiy
- (Cyprus) Vladimiros Tziortzis
- (Belgium) Stoffel Vandoorne
- (France) Matthieu Vaxivière
- (France) Toni Vilander
- (Germany) Andreas Wirth
- (Italy) Daniel Zampieri
- (Russia) Sergey Zlobin

== Series results ==
=== Complete FIA World Endurance Championship results ===
Year	Class	Drivers	No.	1	2	3	4	5	6	7	8	9	T.C.	Points
2014	LMP2	(Russia) Sergey Zlobin (Italy) Maurizio Mediani (France) Nicolas Minassian (Russia) Anton Ladygin (Finland) Mika Salo	27	SIL; 3	SPA; 4	LMS; 1	COA; 2	FUJ; 3	SHA; 2	BHR; Ret	SÃO; 2		1st	146
2014	LMP2	(Russia) Kirill Ladygin (Russia) Viktor Shaytar (Russia) Anton Ladygin (Italy) Maurizio Mediani (France) Nicolas Minassian	37	SIL; Ret	SPA; 3	LMS; Ret	COA; Ret	FUJ; 4	SHA; 3	BHR; 2	SÃO; Ret		4th	60
2015	LMGTE; AM	(Russia) Viktor Shaytar (Russia) Aleksey Basov (Italy) Andrea Bertolini	72	SIL; 3	SPA; 3	LMS; 1	NÜR; 1	COA; 1	FUJ; 6	SHA; 3	BHR; 5		1st	165
2016	LMP2	(Italy) Maurizio Mediani (France) Nicolas Minassian (Russia) David Markozov (Russia) Mikhail Aleshin	27	SIL; 9	SPA; Ret	LMS; 5	NÜR; 8	MEX; 6	COA; 4	FUJ; 8	SHA; 6	BHR; 8	8th	62
2016	LMP2	(Russia) Vitaly Petrov (Russia) Viktor Shaytar (Russia) Kirill Ladygin	37	SIL; 7	SPA; 7	LMS; 3	NÜR; 6	MEX; Ret	COA; 6	FUJ; 10	SHA; 7	BHR; 7	6th	71
2018–19	LMP1	(Russia) Mikhail Aleshin (Russia) Vitaly Petrov (United Kingdom) Jenson Button (New Zealand) Brendon Hartley (Belgium) Stoffel Vandoorne	11	SPA; 5	LMS; Ret	SIL; Ret	FUJ; 4	SHA; 3	SEB; 3	SPA; 3	LMS; 3		4th	94
2018–19	LMP1	(France) Stéphane Sarrazin (Russia) Egor Orudzhev (Russia) Matevos Isaakyan (Russia) Sergey Sirotkin	17	SPA; Ret	LMS; Ret	SIL; 3	FUJ; Ret	SHA; Ret	SEB; NC	SPA; 4	LMS; Ret		14th	27

=== 24 Hours of Le Mans ===
Year	Entrant	No.	Car	Drivers	Class	Laps	Pos.	Class Pos.
2014	(Russia) SMP Racing	27	Oreca 03R-Nissan	(Russia) Anton Ladygin (Finland) Mika Salo (Russia) Sergey Zlobin	LMP2	303	37th	12th
2014	(Russia) SMP Racing	37	Oreca 03R-Nissan	(Russia) Kirill Ladygin (Italy) Maurizio Mediani (France) Nicolas Minassian	LMP2	9	DNF	DNF
2014	(Russia) SMP Racing	72	Ferrari 458 Italia GT2	(Russia) Aleksey Basov (Italy) Andrea Bertolini (Russia) Viktor Shaytar	LMGTE Am	196	DNF	DNF
2015	(Russia) SMP Racing	27	BR Engineering BR01-Nissan	(Russia) David Markozov (Italy) Maurizio Mediani (France) Nicolas Minassian	LMP2	340	14th	6th
2015	(Russia) SMP Racing	37	BR Engineering BR01-Nissan	(Russia) Mikhail Aleshin (Russia) Anton Ladygin (Russia) Kirill Ladygin	LMP2	322	33rd	13th
2015	(Russia) SMP Racing	72	Ferrari 458 Italia GT2	(Russia) Aleksey Basov (Italy) Andrea Bertolini (Russia) Viktor Shaytar	LMGTE Am	332	20th	1st
2016	(Russia) SMP Racing	27	BR Engineering BR01-Nissan	(Russia) Mikhail Aleshin (Italy) Maurizio Mediani (France) Nicolas Minassian	LMP2	347	11th	7th
2016	(Russia) SMP Racing	37	BR Engineering BR01-Nissan	(Russia) Kirill Ladygin (Russia) Vitaly Petrov (Russia) Viktor Shaytar	LMP2	353	7th	3rd
2017	(Russia) SMP Racing	27	Dallara P217-Gibson	(Russia) Mikhail Aleshin (Russia) Viktor Shaytar (Russia) Sergey Sirotkin	LMP2	330	33rd	16th
2018	(Russia) SMP Racing	11	BR Engineering BR1-AER	(Russia) Mikhail Aleshin (United Kingdom) Jenson Button (Russia) Vitaly Petrov	LMP1	315	DNF	DNF
2018	(Russia) SMP Racing	17	BR Engineering BR1-AER	(Russia) Matevos Isaakyan (Russia) Egor Orudzhev (France) Stéphane Sarrazin	LMP1	123	DNF	DNF
2018	(Russia) SMP Racing	35	Dallara P217-Gibson	(France) Norman Nato (United Kingdom) Harrison Newey (Russia) Viktor Shaytar	LMP2	345	14th	10th
2019	(Russia) SMP Racing	11	BR Engineering BR1-AER	(Russia) Mikhail Aleshin (Russia) Vitaly Petrov (Belgium) Stoffel Vandoorne	LMP1	379	3rd	3rd
2019	(Russia) SMP Racing	17	BR Engineering BR1-AER	(Russia) Egor Orudzhev (France) Stéphane Sarrazin (Russia) Sergey Sirotkin	LMP1	163	DNF	DNF

=== GT World Challenge Europe Endurance Cup ===
Year	Car	Drivers	No.	1	2	3	4	T.C.	Points
2020	Ferrari 488 GT3	(Russia) Sergey Sirotkin (All) (Spain) Miguel Molina (Rd. 1-3) (Italy) Davide Rigon(Rd. 1-3) (Italy) Antonio Fuoco (Rd. 4) (Finland) Toni Vilander (Rd. 4)	72	IMO; 20	SPA; 14	NUR; 19	LEC; 7	1st (Note: While SMP was awarded the teams championship, the number 51 AF Corse Ferrari scored all the points.)	80

== Branding ==
SMP Racing also was a moniker for these teams, when SMP sponsored them:

- ADM Motorsport, a motor racing team based in Italy
- AF Corse, a motor racing team based in Italy
- AV Formula, a motor racing team based in Spain
- Comtec Racing, a motor racing team based in the United Kingdom
- Euronova Racing, a motor racing team based in Italy
- Koiranen GP, a motor racing team based in Finland
- Russian Bears Motorsport, a motor racing team based in Russia
- Schmidt Peterson Motorsports, а motor racing team based in the USA

== See also ==
- Escuderia Telmex, a Mexican team founded by similar ambitions
