= Perfection Racing =

Danish auto-racing team

Perfection Racing is a Danish auto racing team, who currently compete in the Danish Touring Car Championship under the banner of Chevrolet Motorsport Denmark. They are based in Odense and managed by Kent Bo Steffensen.

In September 2009 they will enter the World Touring Car Championship at the FIA WTCC Race of Germany at Motorsport Arena Oschersleben with a Chevrolet Lacetti for Michel Nykjaer, who won the 2008 European Touring Car Cup for the team, having won it for GR Asia the previous year.

They currently run two cars in the Danish series, for Nykjaer and Henrik Lundgaard. The team will leave the Danish championship at the end of the 2009 season.
