= Golden Motors =

(Russia) Golden Motors
- Founded: 2004
- Team principal(s): Andrey Smetsky
- Current series: FTCC
- Former series: World Touring Car Championship (WTCC)
- Teams' Championships: 2007 RTCC
- Drivers' Championships: 2007 Russian Touring Car Championship (RTCC) (Lvov)

Golden Motors is a Russian auto racing team based in Saint Petersburg. They are best known for their efforts in the FIA World Touring Car Championship.

== Team history ==
The team was formed in 2004 by businessman and driver Andrey Smetsky along with Alexander Lvov, a successful driver in the Russian Touring Car Championship (RTCC). They initially ran Super Production class Honda Civic Type Rs in the RTCC, switching to the Super 2000 Honda Accord Euro R for 2007. These new cars had been prepared by the Italian World Touring Car Championship team, JAS Motorsport. Golden Motors entered one round of the WTCC at Anderstorp under the Golden Motors Honda Dealer Team banner. They returned for two rounds in 2008, at Valencia and Brno. No success was achieved and the team did not return to the WTCC in 2009. They have most recently competed in the Finnish Touring Car Championship.

The team has also competed in the European Touring Car Cup. In 2006 Lvov won the Super Production class.
