= Andrey Smetsky =

Russian auto racing driver (born 1973)

Andrey Smetsky (born 16 February 1973 in Leningrad) is a Russian auto racing driver.

== Career ==
He has competed in the Russian Volkswagen Polo Cup, Russian Super Production Championship and the Russian Lada Ice Cup. In 2007 he finished runner-up in the Russian Touring Car Championship with a touring class Honda Accord. That same year he competed in round of the FIA World Touring Car Championship for his Golden Motors team. In 2008 he returned for two rounds of the WTCC with no success. Due to budget reasons, the team switched to the Finnish Touring Car Championship and Smetsky has not returned to the WTCC since.

=== Complete WTCC results ===
(key) (Races in bold indicate pole position) (Races in italics indicate fastest lap)

| Year | Team | Car | 1 | 2 | 3 | | 4 | 5 | | 6 | 7 | | 8 | 9 | 10 | 11 | 12 | Position | Points |
| 2007 | Golden Motors | Honda Accord Euro R | CUR | ZAN | VAL | | PAU | BRN | | POR | AND | | OSC | BRA | MNZ | MAC | | - | 0 |
|---|---|---|---|---|---|---|---|---|---|---|---|---|---|---|---|---|---|---|---|
| 2007 | Golden Motors | Honda Accord Euro R | | | | | | | | | 26 | 27 | | | | | | - | 0 |
| 2008 | Golden Motors | Honda Accord Euro R | CUR | PUE | VAL | | PAU | BRN | | EST | BRA} | | OSC | IMO | MNZ | OKA | MAC | - | 0 |
| 2008 | Golden Motors | Honda Accord Euro R | | | 21 | 21 | | 24 | 22 | | | | | | | | | - | 0 |
