= Olivier Pla =

French racing driver (born 1981)

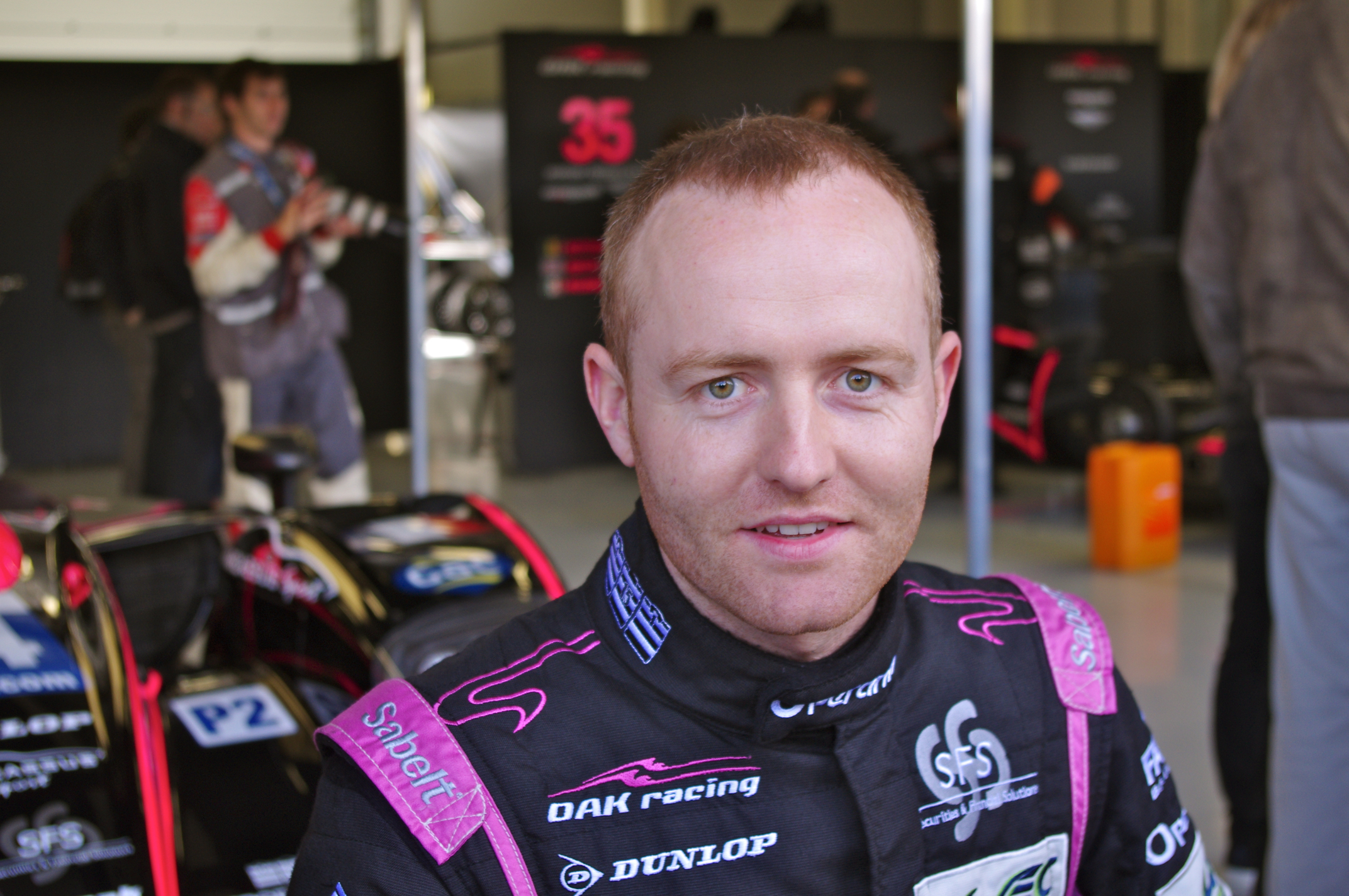
- Pla at the 2013 6 Hours of Silverstone
- Nationality: (France) French
- Born: 22 October 1981 (age 45) Toulouse (France)

Le Mans Series (LMP2) career
- Debut season: 2008
- Current team: Quifel ASM Team
- Categorisation: FIA Platinum
- Starts: 10
- Wins: 2
- Poles: 3
- Fastest laps: 5
- Best finish: 1st in 2009

Previous series
- 2007 2005–07 2004 2003 2001–02 2000: Porsche Cup Germany; GP2 Series; World Series by Nissan; Formula 3 Euro Series; French Formula Three; Formula Campus

24 Hours of Le Mans career
- Years: 2008–2016
- Teams: OAK Racing, Quifel ASM Team
- Best finish: 8th (2013)

Olivier Pla (born 22 October 1981) is a French racing driver who competed in the Asian Le Mans Series for AF Corse.

== Career ==
=== French Formula Campus and Formula Three ===
Born in Toulouse, Pla started his career in 2000 in French Formula Campus before moving on to French Formula Three Championship in 2001 with the Saulnier Racing team. He finished eighth in the series standings, taking nine points-scoring positions in eleven races, including a podium in the penultimate race of the season at Magny-Cours.

In 2002, Pla stayed in the series but switched to the ASM team. He finished third, behind Tristan Gommendy and Renaud Derlot, taking nine podium places from fourteen races, including wins at Croix-en-Ternois and Bugatti Circuit.

In 2003, Pla joined the Formula 3 Euro Series with ASM. He finished third, behind Christian Klien and Ryan Briscoe, taking nine podium places from twenty races.

=== World Series by Nissan ===
2004 saw Pla leave the Euroseries, joining the World Series by Nissan. He contested two rounds with RC Motorsport before joining Carlin Motorsport to replace Michael Keohane. He finished ninth, taking thirteen points-scoring positions in eighteen races, including a win at Estoril.

=== GP2 Series ===
In 2005, Pla raced in the inaugural GP2 Series season for David Price Racing. In the early part of the season he stalled on the grid several times — some blamed the GP2 cars for the high number of stallings, while others noticed that the same drivers seemed to be affected regularly. In another race his team mate selected reverse instead of first gear and went backwards into Pla's car. However, he took advantage of the reverse grid system to finish eighth in Race One and thus take pole for Race Two twice (at Hockenheim and Silverstone), winning both those races to finish 11th in the championship. He remained with DPR for 2006, but was dropped mid-season after running out of sponsorship, after a difficult period which saw him score no points and injure his hand in Monaco.

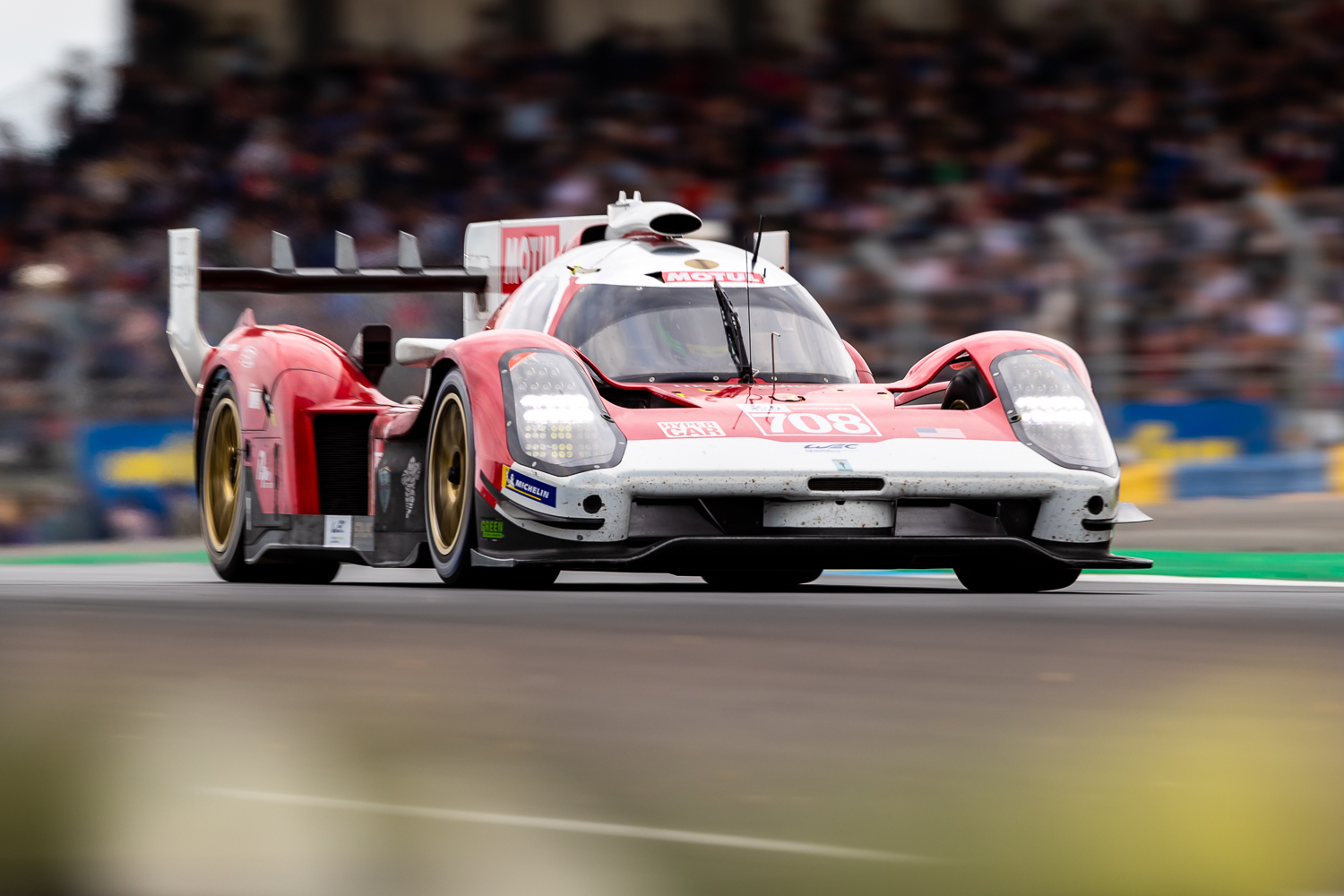
Pla at the 2021 24 Hours of Le Mans.

In 2007, Pla competed in the German Porsche Carrera Cup. However, he was recalled to DPR in the latter stages of the GP2 season to replace the injured Christian Bakkerud. In 2008, he moved to sports car racing, driving a Lola Le Mans Prototype in the Le Mans Series and 24 Hours of Le Mans.

=== WeatherTech SportsCar Championship ===
Pla joined Mazda Motorsports for part of the 2020 WeatherTech SportsCar Championship campaign and signed with Meyer Shank Racing for a full DPi season in 2021.

== Racing record ==
=== Career summary ===
Season	Series	Team	Races	Wins	Poles	F/Laps	Podiums	Points	Position
2000	Formula Renault Campus France	Formula Campus	?	?	?	?	?	391	**3rd**
2001	French Formula Three Championship	Saulnier Racing	11	0	0	0	1	74	8th
2002	French Formula Three Championship	ASM	14	2	3	1	9	159	**3rd**
2002	FIA European Formula Three Cup	ASM	1	0	0	0	0	N/A	7th
2002	Korea Super Prix	ASM	1	1	1	0	1	N/A	**1st**
2002	Masters of Formula 3	ASM	1	0	0	0	0	N/A	**2nd**
2002	Macau Grand Prix	ASM	1	0	0	0	0	N/A	DNF
2003	Formula 3 Euro Series	ASM	20	0	3	0	8	74	**3rd**
2003	Masters of Formula 3	ASM	1	0	0	0	0	N/A	7th
2004	World Series by Nissan	RC Motorsport	18	1	0	0	1	56	9th
2004	World Series by Nissan	Carlin Motorsport	18	1	0	0	1	56	9th
2005	GP2 Series	DPR	22	2	0	1	2	20	13th
2006	GP2 Series	DPR/DPR Direxiv	9	0	0	0	0	0	27th
2007	Porsche Carrera Cup Germany	MRS-Team	9	0	1	0	0	34	15th
2007	GP2 Series	DPR	2	0	0	0	0	0	35th
2008	Le Mans Series - LMP2	Quifel ASM Team	5	0	0	0	1	12	8th
2008	24 Hours of Le Mans - LMP2	Quifel ASM Team	1	0	0	0	0	N/A	4th
2008	American Le Mans Series	Team LNT	1	0	0	0	0	20	14th
2009	Le Mans Series - LMP2	Quifel ASM Team	5	2	3	5	3	33	**1st**
2009	24 Hours of Le Mans - LMP2	Quifel ASM Team	1	0	0	0	0	N/A	DNF
2010	Le Mans Series - LMP2	Quifel ASM Team	5	1	0	0	3	44	6th
2010	24 Hours of Le Mans - LMP2	Quifel ASM Team	1	0	0	0	0	N/A	7th
2011	Le Mans Series - LMP1	Quifel ASM Team	3	0	0	0	1	9	5th
2011	24 Hours of Le Mans - LMP1	Quifel ASM Team	1	0	0	0	0	N/A	DNF
2011	Blancpain Endurance Series	SOFREV ASP	1	0	0	0	0	8	29th
2011	French GT Championship	SOFREV ASP	14	0	1	3	2	58	10th
2012	FIA World Endurance Championship	OAK Racing	8	0	1	?	0	18.5	20th
2012	24 Hours of Le Mans - LMP2	OAK Racing	1	0	0	0	0	N/A	DNF
2012	European Le Mans Series - LMP2	OAK Racing	2	1	1	0	2	62	**2nd**
2012	Blancpain Endurance Series	SMG Challenge	4	0	0	0	0	9	22nd
2013	World Endurance Championship - LMP2	OAK Racing	8	0	1	0	5	132.5	**2nd**
2013	24 Hours of Le Mans - LMP2	OAK Racing	1	0	1	0	1	N/A	**2nd**
2013	Blancpain Endurance Series - Pro-Am	SMG Challenge	1	0	0	0	0	13	28th
2014	FIA World Endurance Championship - LMP2	G-Drive Racing	8	4	7	7	6	137	**2nd**
2014	24 Hours of Le Mans - LMP2	G-Drive Racing	1	0	0	0	0	N/A	DNF
2014	United SportsCar Championship - Prototype	G-Drive Racing	6	1	0	1	2	172	14th
2014	Blancpain Endurance Series - Pro-Am	TDS Racing	1	0	0	0	0	9	22nd
2014	FFSA GT Championship	TDS Racing	2	0	0	0	0	0	NC†
2015	24 Hours of Le Mans - LMP1	Nissan Motorsports	1	0	0	0	0	N/A	DNF
2015	European Le Mans Series - LMP2	Krohn Racing	2	0	0	0	0	14	15th
2015	United SportsCar Championship - Prototype	Krohn Racing	2	0	1	0	5	45	20th
2015	Blancpain Endurance Series - Pro-Am	Nissan GT Academy Team RJN	1	0	0	0	0	6	25th
2016	FIA World Endurance Championship - GTE Pro	Ford Chip Ganassi Team UK	9	1	1	0	3	118	4th
2016	24 Hours of Le Mans - GTE Pro	Ford Chip Ganassi Team UK	1	0	0	0	0	N/A	4th
2016	IMSA SportsCar Championship - Prototype	Michael Shank Racing with Curb-Agajanian	4	1	2	3	2	113	13th
2016	European Le Mans Series - LMP2	Krohn Racing	5	0	0	0	0	8	12th
2017	FIA World Endurance Championship - GTE Pro	Ford Chip Ganassi Team UK	9	0	0	1	1	95	8th
2017	24 Hours of Le Mans - GTE Pro	Ford Chip Ganassi Team UK	1	0	0	0	0	N/A	10th
2017	IMSA SportsCar Championship - GTLM	Ford Chip Ganassi Team UK	2	0	0	0	0	50	20th
2017	IMSA SportsCar Championship - Prototype	PR1/Mathiasen Motorsports	4	0	0	2	0	99	16th
2017	European Le Mans Series - LMP2	IDEC Sport Racing	3	0	0	0	0	2.5	23rd
2018	European Le Mans Series - LMP2	Racing Engineering	5	1	0	0	2	66	**3rd**
2018	IMSA SportsCar Championship - Prototype	Tequila Patrón ESM	3	0	0	0	0	43	40th
2018	Blancpain GT Series Endurance Cup	Garage 59	1	0	0	0	0	0	NC
2018	Intercontinental GT Challenge	Garage 59	1	0	0	0	0	6	22nd
2018	24 Hours of Le Mans - GTE Pro	Ford Chip Ganassi Team UK	1	0	0	0	0	N/A	6th
2018-19	FIA World Endurance Championship - GTE Pro	Ford Chip Ganassi Team UK	8	1	2	0	2	88	5th
2019	24 Hours of Le Mans - GTE Pro	Ford Chip Ganassi Team UK	1	0	0	0	0	N/A	6th
2019	European Le Mans Series - LMP2	Thunderhead Carlin Racing	1	0	0	0	0	27.5	15th
2019	European Le Mans Series - LMP2	Algarve Pro Racing	4	0	0	0	0	27.5	15th
2019	IMSA SportsCar Championship - DPi	Mazda Team Joest	4	1	1	1	1	102	14th
2020	24 Hours of Le Mans - GTE Pro	Risi Competizione	1	0	0	0	0	N/A	4th
2020	IMSA SportsCar Championship - DPi	Mazda Team Joest/Mazda Motorsports	4	0	1	1	2	110	13th
2021	IMSA SportsCar Championship - DPi	Meyer Shank Racing with Curb-Agajanian	10	0	0	0	2	2668	8th
2021	FIA World Endurance Championship - Hypercar	Glickenhaus Racing	2	0	0	0	0	24	7th
2022	FIA World Endurance Championship - Hypercar	Glickenhaus Racing	4	0	2	0	3	70	4th
2022	24 Hours of Le Mans - Hypercar	Glickenhaus Racing	1	0	0	0	0	N/A	4th
2022	IMSA SportsCar Championship - DPi	Whelen Engineering Racing	5	0	0	1	2	1508	8th
2023	FIA World Endurance Championship - Hypercar	Glickenhaus Racing	5	0	0	0	0	34	10th
2023	24 Hours of Le Mans - Hypercar	Glickenhaus Racing	1	0	0	0	0	N/A	6th
2024-25	Asian Le Mans Series - LMP2	AF Corse	6	0	0	0	0	27	9th

=== Complete French Formula Three Championship results ===
(key) (Races in bold indicate pole position) (Races in italics indicate fastest lap)

Year	Entrant	Chassis	Engine	Class	1	2	3	4	5	6	7	8	9	10	11	12	13	14	DC	Pts
2001	Saulnier Racing	Dallara F399	Renault	A	NOG; 1; 11	NOG; 2; 9	LÉD; 10	MAG; 7	VDV; 6	SPA; 1; 8	SPA; 2 Ret	CRT; 7	ALB; 6	LMS; 3	MAG; 8				8th	74
2002	ASM	Dallara F302	Renault	A	NOG; 1; 6	NOG; 2 Ret	LÉD; 1; 10	LÉD; 2; 2	DIJ; 1; 4	DIJ; 2; 3	**CRT**; **1**; 1	CRT; 2; 2	ALB; 1; 13	ALB; 2; 2	**LMS**; **1**; 1	LMS; 2; 3	MAG; 1; 2	**MAG**; **2**; 3	3rd	159

=== Complete Formula 3 Euro Series results ===
(key) (Races in bold indicate pole position) (Races in italics indicate fastest lap)

Year	Entrant	Chassis	Engine	1	2	3	4	5	6	7	8	9	10	11	12	13	14	15	16	17	18	19	20	DC	Pts
2003	ASM F3	Dallara F303/014	Mercedes	**HOC**; **1** DSQ	**HOC**; **2**; 2	ADR; 1; 8	ADR; 2; 3	PAU; 1; 2	PAU; 2; 16	NOR; 1; 3	NOR; 2 Ret	LMS; 1; 4	**LMS**; **2**; 24	NÜR; 1; 2	NÜR; 2; 9	A1R; 1; 27	A1R; 2; 4	ZAN; 1; 3	ZAN; 2; 3	HOC; 1; 10	HOC; 2; 6	MAG; 1; 2	MAG; 2; 7	3rd	74

=== Complete World Series by Nissan results ===
(key) (Races in bold indicate pole position) (Races in italics indicate fastest lap)

Year	Entrant	1	2	3	4	5	6	7	8	9	10	11	12	13	14	15	16	17	18	DC	Points
2004	Tata RC Motorsport	JAR; 1; 9	JAR; 2 Ret	ZOL; 1; 7	ZOL; 2; 7															9th	66
2004	Carlin Motorsport					MAG; 1; 10	MAG; 2; 10	VAL; 1; 4	VAL; 2; 5	LAU; 1; 8	LAU; 2; 17	EST; 1; 1	EST; 2; 9	CAT; 1; 9	CAT; 2 Ret	VAL; 1; 4	VAL; 2 Ret	JER; 1; 3	JER; 2; 15	9th	66

=== Complete GP2 Series results ===
(key) (Races in bold indicate pole position) (Races in italics indicate fastest lap)

Year	Entrant	1	2	3	4	5	6	7	8	9	10	11	12	13	14	15	16	17	18	19	20	21	22	23	DC	Points
2005	DPR	IMO; FEA; 9	IMO; SPR; 5	CAT; FEA; Ret	CAT; SPR; Ret	MON; FEA; 9	NÜR; FEA; Ret	NÜR; SPR; 8	MAG; FEA; Ret	MAG; SPR; 9	SIL; FEA; 8	SIL; SPR; 1	HOC; FEA; 8	HOC; SPR; 1	HUN; FEA; 7	HUN; SPR; Ret	IST; FEA; 9	IST; SPR; 17	MNZ; FEA; Ret	MNZ; SPR; Ret	SPA; FEA; 11	SPA; SPR; 10	BHR; FEA; Ret	BHR; SPR; DNS	13th	20
2006	DPR Direxiv	VAL; FEA; 10	VAL; SPR; 15	IMO; FEA; Ret	IMO; SPR; 20†	NÜR; FEA; 15	NÜR; SPR; Ret	CAT; FEA; DSQ	CAT; SPR; 20	MON; FEA; Ret	SIL; FEA	SIL; SPR	MAG; FEA; 16	MAG; SPR; 9	HOC; FEA	HOC; SPR	HUN; FEA	HUN; SPR	IST; FEA	IST; SPR	MNZ; FEA	MNZ; SPR			27th	0
2007	DPR	BHR; FEA	BHR; SPR	CAT; FEA	CAT; SPR	MON; FEA	MAG; FEA	MAG; SPR	SIL; FEA	SIL; SPR	NÜR; FEA	NÜR; SPR	HUN; FEA	HUN; SPR	IST; FEA	IST; SPR	MNZ; FEA; Ret	MNZ; SPR; 13	SPA; FEA	SPA; SPR	VAL; FEA	VAL; SPR			35th	0

=== Complete 24 Hours of Le Mans results ===
Year	Team	Co-Drivers	Car	Class	Laps	Pos.	Class Pos.
2008	(Portugal) Quifel ASM Team	(Portugal) Miguel Amaral (United Kingdom) Guy Smith	Lola B05/40-AER	LMP2	325	20th	4th
2009	(Portugal) Quifel ASM Team	(Portugal) Miguel Amaral (United Kingdom) Guy Smith	Ginetta-Zytek GZ09S/2	LMP2	46	DNF	DNF
2010	(Portugal) Quifel ASM Team	(Portugal) Miguel Amaral (United Kingdom) Warren Hughes	Ginetta-Zytek GZ09S/2	LMP2	318	20th	7th
2011	(Portugal) Quifel ASM Team	(Portugal) Miguel Amaral (United Kingdom) Warren Hughes	Zytek 09SC	LMP1	48	DNF	DNF
2012	(France) OAK Racing	(France) Jacques Nicolet (France) Matthieu Lahaye	Morgan LMP2-Judd	LMP2	139	DNF	DNF
2013	(France) OAK Racing	(Denmark) David Heinemeier Hansson (United Kingdom) Alex Brundle	Morgan LMP2-Nissan	LMP2	328	8th	**2nd**
2014	(Russia) G-Drive Racing	(Russia) Roman Rusinov (France) Julien Canal	Morgan LMP2-Nissan	LMP2	120	DNF	DNF
2015	(Japan) Nissan Motorsports	(United Kingdom) Jann Mardenborough (United Kingdom) Max Chilton	Nissan GT-R LM Nismo	LMP1	234	DNF	DNF
2016	(United States) Ford Chip Ganassi Team UK	(United States) Billy Johnson (Germany) Stefan Mücke	Ford GT	GTE; Pro	339	21st	4th
2017	(United States) Ford Chip Ganassi Team UK	(United States) Billy Johnson (Germany) Stefan Mücke	Ford GT	GTE; Pro	332	27th	10th
2018	(United States) Ford Chip Ganassi Team UK	(United States) Billy Johnson (Germany) Stefan Mücke	Ford GT	GTE; Pro	340	21st	6th
2019	(United States) Ford Chip Ganassi Team UK	(United States) Billy Johnson (Germany) Stefan Mücke	Ford GT	GTE; Pro	340	25th	6th
2020	(United States) Risi Competizione	(France) Sébastien Bourdais (France) Jules Gounon	Ferrari 488 GTE Evo	GTE; Pro	339	23rd	4th
2021	(United States) Glickenhaus Racing	(France) Franck Mailleux (Brazil) Pipo Derani	Glickenhaus SCG 007 LMH	Hypercar	367	4th	4th
2022	(United States) Glickenhaus Racing	(Brazil) Pipo Derani (France) Romain Dumas	Glickenhaus SCG 007 LMH	Hypercar	370	4th	4th
2023	(United States) Glickenhaus Racing	(Australia) Ryan Briscoe (France) Romain Dumas	Glickenhaus SCG 007 LMH	Hypercar	335	6th	6th

=== Complete FIA World Endurance Championship results ===
Year	Entrant	Class	Chassis	Engine	1	2	3	4	5	6	7	8	9	Rank	Pts
2012	OAK Racing	LMP2	Morgan LMP2	Judd HK 3.6 L V8	**SEB**; 2	SPA; 5	LMS; Ret							20th	18.5
2012	OAK Racing	LMP2	Morgan LMP2	Nissan VK45DE 4.5 L V8				SIL; 6	SÃO; 3	BHR; 6	FUJ; 3	SHA; 3		20th	18.5
2013	OAK Racing	LMP2	Morgan LMP2	Nissan VK45DE 4.5 L V8	SIL; 2	SPA; 2	**LMS**; 2	SÃO; 6	COA; 6	FUJ; 3	SHA; 2	BHR; 2		2nd	132.5
2014	G-Drive Racing	LMP2	Morgan LMP2	Nissan VK45DE 4.5 L V8	**SIL**; 1	SPA; 1	**LMS**; Ret							2nd	137
2014	G-Drive Racing	LMP2	Ligier JS P2	Nissan VK45DE 4.5 L V8				**COA**; 3	**FUJ**; 1	**SHA**; 1	**BHR**; 3	**SÃO**; Ret		2nd	137
2015	Nissan Motorsports	LMP1	Nissan GT-R LM Nismo	Nissan VRX30A 3.0 L Turbo V6	SIL	SPA	LMS; Ret	NÜR	COA	FUJ	SHA	BHR		34th	0
2016	Ford Chip Ganassi Team UK	LMGTE Pro	Ford GT	Ford EcoBoost 3.5 L Turbo V6	SIL; 5	SPA; Ret	LMS; 1	NÜR; 4	MEX; 11	COA; 13	**FUJ**; 2	SHA; 2	BHR; 6	4th	118
2017	Ford Chip Ganassi Team UK	LMGTE Pro	Ford GT	Ford EcoBoost 3.5 L Turbo V6	SIL; 4	SPA; 3	LMS; 6	NÜR; 6	MEX; 7	COA; 8	FUJ; 4	SHA; 4	BHR; 5	8th	95
2018–19	Ford Chip Ganassi Team UK	LMGTE Pro	Ford GT	Ford EcoBoost 3.5 L Turbo V6	SPA; 1	LMS; 3	**SIL**; 6	FUJ; 8	**SHA**; 7	SEB; 18	SPA; 10	LMS; 4		5th	88
2021	Glickenhaus Racing	Hypercar	Glickenhaus SCG 007 LMH	Glickenhaus 3.5 L Turbo V8	SPA	ALG	MNZ; Ret	LMS; 4	BHR	BHR				7th	24
2022	Glickenhaus Racing	Hypercar	Glickenhaus SCG 007 LMH	Glickenhaus 3.5 L Turbo V8	SEB; 3	**SPA**; 3	LMS; 3	**MNZ**; Ret	FUJ	BHR				4th	70
2023	Glickenhaus Racing	Hypercar	Glickenhaus SCG 007 LMH	Glickenhaus 3.5 L Turbo V8	SEB; Ret	ALG; 8	SPA; 7	LMS; 5	MNZ; 8	FUJ	BHR			10th	34

=== Complete IMSA SportsCar Championship results ===
(key) (Races in bold indicate pole position; races in italics indicate fastest lap.)

Year	Team	No.	Class	Make	Engine	1	2	3	4	5	6	7	8	9	10	11	12	Pos.	Points	Ref
2014	OAK Racing	42	P	Morgan LMP2	Nissan VK45DE 4.5 V8	DAY; 6	SEB; 4	LBH; 4	LGA	DET; 3	WGL	**MOS**; 1	IMS	ELK; 11	COA	PET		21st	172	
2015	Krohn Racing	57	P	Ligier JS P2	Judd HK 3.6 V8	DAY; 13	**SEB**; 6	LBH	LGA	DET	WGL	MOS	ELK	COA	PET			20th	45	
2016	Michael Shank Racing with Curb-Agajanian	60	P	Ligier JS P2	Honda HR35TT 3.5 Turbo V6	DAY; 11	**SEB**; 7	LBH	LGA	DET	WGL; 3	MOS	ELK	COA	**PET**; 1			13th	113	
2017	Ford Chip Ganassi Racing		GTLM	Ford GT	Ford 3.5 EcoBoost V6	DAY; 7	SEB; 5	LBH	COA				LIM		VIR			20th	50	
2017	PR1/Mathiasen Motorsports	52	P	Ligier JS P217	Gibson GK428 4.2 V8					DET	WGL; 4	MOS		ELK; 7		LGA; 7	PET; 10	16th	99	
2018	Tequila Patrón ESM	2	P	Nissan Onroak DPi	Nissan VR38DETT 3.8 Turbo V6	DAY; 19	SEB; 16	LBH	MDO	DET	WGL; 15	MOS	ELK	LGA	PET			40th	43	
2019	Mazda Team Joest	55	DPi	Mazda RT24-P	Mazda MZ-2.0T 2.0 L Turbo I4	DAY; 9	SEB; 6	LBH	MDO	DET	**WGL**; 1	MOS	ELK	LGA	PET; 11			14th	102	
2020	Mazda Team Joest	77	DPi	Mazda RT24-P	Mazda MZ-2.0T 2.0 L Turbo I4	DAY; 2	DAY	SEB	ELK									13th	110	
2020	Mazda Motorsports	77	DPi	Mazda RT24-P	Mazda MZ-2.0T 2.0 L Turbo I4					ATL; 7	MDO	PET; 7	LGA	SEB; 3				13th	110	
2021	Meyer Shank Racing with Curb-Agajanian	60	DPi	Acura ARX-05	Acura AR35TT 3.5 L Turbo V6	DAY; 4	SEB; 3	MDO; 6	DET; 6	WGL; 2	WGL; 6	ELK; 5	LGA; 4	LBH; 6	PET			8th	2668	
2022	Whelen Engineering Racing	31	DPi	Cadillac DPi-V.R	Cadillac 5.5 L V8	DAY	SEB	LBH	LGA	MDO	DET; 6	WGL; 5	MOS; 3	ELK; 6	PET; 2			8th	1508	

=== Complete Asian Le Mans Series results ===
(key) (Races in bold indicate pole position) (Races in italics indicate fastest lap)

Year	Team	Class	Car	Engine	1	2	3	4	5	6	Pos.	Points
2024–25	AF Corse	LMP2	Oreca 07	Gibson GK428 4.2 L V8	SEP; 1; 8	SEP; 2; 7	DUB; 1; 10	DUB; 2; 6	ABU; 1; 9	ABU; 2; 7	9th	27

Sporting positions
Preceded by Jonathan Cochet	Korea Super Prix; Winner; 2002	Succeeded by Richard Antinucci
Preceded by Jos Verstappen	Le Mans Series — LMP2 Champion; 2009; With Miguel Amaral	Succeeded by Thomas Erdos; Mike Newton
