= CLM P1/01 =

LMP1 race car

CLM P1/01 ENSO CLM P1/01
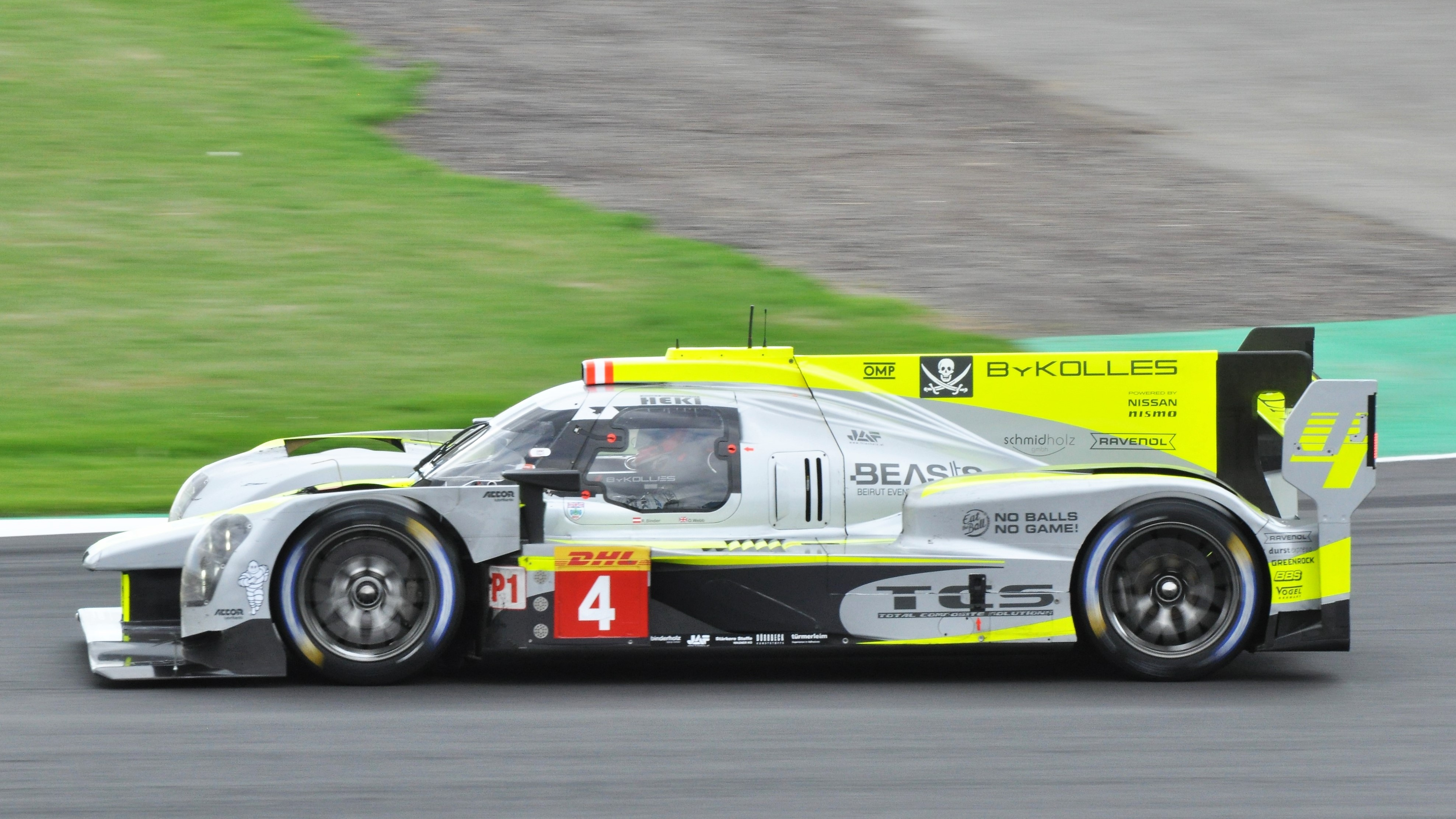
- ENSO CLM P1/01 at the 2018 6 Hours of Silverstone
- Category: Le Mans Prototype (LMP1)
- Constructor: Lotus (Kodewa)
- Designer: Paul White (chief designer)
- Successor: Vanwall Vandervell 680

Technical specifications
- Chassis: Carbon fibre composite monocoque
- Suspension (front): Independent double wishbones with adjustable dampers
- Suspension (rear): Independent double wishbones with adjustable dampers
- Wheelbase: 13 in × 18 in (330.2 mm × 457.2 mm)
- Engine: AER P60 2.4 L V6 twin-turbocharged; Nissan VRX30A 3.0 L V6 twin-turbocharged; Gibson GL458 4.5 L V8 naturally Aspirated; mid-engined, mid-mounted configuration
- Transmission: X-Trac 7-speed sequential manual
- Power: 600 bhp (447 kW; 608 PS)
- Weight: 850 kg (1,874 lb)
- Fuel: Shell
- Lubricants: Various
- Brakes: Carbon Ceramic Discs
- Tyres: Michelin (previously Dunlop)

Competition history
- Notable entrants: (Austria) ByKolles Racing (Romania) Lotus
- Notable drivers: (Switzerland) Simon Trummer (Germany) Pierre Kaffer (United Kingdom) James Rossiter (United Kingdom) Oliver Webb (France) Christophe Bouchut (Austria) Lucas Auer (France) Nathanaël Berthon (Austria) Christian Klien (Portugal) Tiago Monteiro (Italy) Vitantonio Liuzzi (Austria) Dominik Kraihamer (Italy) Marco Bonanomi (Austria) René Binder (France) Tom Dillmann (Italy) Paolo Ruberti (Canada) Bruno Spengler
- Debut: 2014 6 Hours of Circuit of the Americas
- Last event: 2020 24 Hours of Le Mans
| Races | Wins | F/Laps |
|---|---|---|
| 35 | 3 | 0 |
- Teams' Championships: 0
- Drivers' Championships: 0

The CLM P1/01, renamed ENSO CLM P1/01 in 2017, is a sports prototype racing car built for Lotus Racing in 2014. The Lotus team entered the last five rounds of the World Endurance championship in 2014, but later took name as the Austrian based team ByKolles Racing. It is designed to meet the 2014 LMP1-L regulations for Le Mans Prototypes in the FIA World Endurance Championship as well as at the 24 Hours of Le Mans. The P1/01 debuted at the 2014 6 Hours of Circuit of the Americas, round four of the FIA World Endurance Championship.

== Development ==
ByKolles Racing, previously known as Kodewa or Lotus Racing, were participating in the FIA World Endurance Championship in the LMP2 class, fielding a pair of Lotus T128 chassis. In 2014, Lotus Racing confirmed that they would enter the LMP1 class with a new chassis, provisionally named the Lotus T129. The new chassis missed the first three rounds of the season, including the 24 Hours of Le Mans, and made its racing debut, renamed as the CLM P1/01, at the 2014 6 Hours of Circuit of the Americas.

== Racing history ==
=== 2014 season ===
The car made its public debut at the 2014 24 Hours of Le Mans, renamed as the Lotus P1/01, however, the car was not able to run in any session of the event due to a change in the engine the car was going to use. The car was originally going to use a 4-litre, naturally aspirated Audi V8, but the deal collapsed for unknown reasons, and the car was fitted with a 2.4-litre twin turbo V6 from AER. The car made its racing debut at the next round of the World Endurance Championship, the 6 Hours of Circuit of the Americas, with car number #9. Although the car was not able to qualify, it finished the event in second place in the LMP1-L class, completing 140 laps, nine laps down on the class winning Rebellion R-One. At the following race in Fuji, the car burst into flames after 181 laps, after a fuel line ruptured. The driver of the car at the time, Christophe Bouchut, escaped without injury, but left the team after the race. The P1/01 claimed one more finish at the following event in Shanghai, but was unable to finish at Bahrain or São Paulo.

| Year | Nat. | Entrant | Class | Nat. | Drivers | Rds. | Rounds | | | | | | | | Points | WEP pos. |
| Year | Nat. | Entrant | Class | Nat. | Drivers | Rds. | 1 | 2 | 3 | 4 | 5 | 6 | 7 | 8 | Points | WEP pos. |
|---|---|---|---|---|---|---|---|---|---|---|---|---|---|---|---|---|
| 2014 | (Romania) | Lotus | LMP1-L | (Austria) (France) (United Kingdom) (Germany) (Switzerland) (France) | Lucas Auer; Christophe Bouchut; James Rossiter; Pierre Kaffer; Simon Trummer; Nathanaël Berthon | 4, 6, 8; 4–5; 4–5; 5–8; 7; 7 | SIL | SPA | LMN | COA; 2 | FUJ; Ret | SHA; 3 | BHR; Ret | SÃO; Ret | 33 | 3rd |

=== 2015 season ===
Minor changes were made to the P1/01 for the 2015 season, including the transmission casing and a change to the bodywork. The revised car made its debut in March, at the Paul Ricard circuit. The car's number also changed from #9 to #4 for this season. The P1/01 claimed its first two wins in the Privateer class, at the Nurburgring and at the Circuit of the Americas. However, the car was excluded from the results of the 24 Hours of Le Mans due to incorrect driver weight ballast.

| Year | Nat. | Entrant | Class | Nat. | Drivers | Rds. | Rounds | | | | | | | | Points | WEP pos. |
| Year | Nat. | Entrant | Class | Nat. | Drivers | Rds. | 1 | 2 | 3 | 4 | 5 | 6 | 7 | 8 | Points | WEP pos. |
|---|---|---|---|---|---|---|---|---|---|---|---|---|---|---|---|---|
| 2015 | (Austria) | Team ByKolles | LMP1 | (Switzerland) (Italy) (Austria) (Germany) (Portugal) | Simon Trummer; Vitantonio Liuzzi; Christian Klien; Pierre Kaffer; Tiago Monteiro | All; 1–2; 1–2; 3–8; 3 | SIL; Ret | SPA; Ret | LMN; EX | NUR; 1 | COA; 1 | FUJ; 2 | SHA; 2 | BHR; 2 | 104 | 3rd |

=== 2016 season ===
The P1/01 returned in 2016, with radically changed bodywork in order to improve the aerodynamics of the car. The car kept the same number as the previous season, #4. The gearbox was also upgraded to a 7-speed from a 6-speed, at the 24 Hours of Le Mans. The car struggled with reliability issues throughout the season, culminating in fires at the 24 Hours of Le Mans and Nürburgring. The Rebellion Racing team withdrew one of their two cars from the championship after Nürburgring, leaving only two cars in the class. The car managed to claim a win in the 2016 6 Hours of Shanghai after the competing Rebellion R-One had technical issues. The car finished 2nd in the Private LMP1 Teams championship.

At the post season rookie test in Bahrain, Former Formula One driver Robert Kubica tested the car.

| Year | Nat. | Entrant | Class | Nat. | Drivers | Rds. | Rounds | | | | | | | | | Points | WEP pos. |
| Year | Nat. | Entrant | Class | Nat. | Drivers | Rds. | 1 | 2 | 3 | 4 | 5 | 6 | 7 | 8 | 9 | Points | WEP pos. |
|---|---|---|---|---|---|---|---|---|---|---|---|---|---|---|---|---|---|
| 2016 | (Austria) | ByKolles Racing Team | LMP1 | (Switzerland) (United Kingdom) (United Kingdom) (Germany) | Simon Trummer; Oliver Webb; James Rossiter; Pierre Kaffer | 1–9; 1–9; 1–2; 3–5, 7-9 | SIL; 3 | SPA; 3 | LMN; Ret | NUR; Ret | MEX; 2 | COA; 2 | FUJ; Ret | SHA; 1 | BHR; 2 | 109 | 2nd |

=== 2017 season ===
The P1/01 was the only non-hybrid entry in the LMP1 class. Along with this, there was no longer a trophy for private LMP1 teams. As such, it was greatly outclassed by its hybrid competition from Porsche and Toyota. The car had a few upgrades coming into the season, most notably addition of the Nissan Nismo VRX30A Evo from Nissan's flopped GT-R LM program over the previous 2.4-litre twin turbo V6 designed by AER. Aerodynamics were also improved and weight of the car was reduced. At Silverstone, the P1/01 completed 155 laps but was involved in a collision with the #97 Aston Martin at the pit lane entry, causing enough damage to the front to make it unable to finish the race. At the Spa-Francorchamps round, the P1/01 managed to finish in 6th position two laps behind the #9 Toyota TS050 Hybrid and one lap ahead of the LMP2 leader, the #26 G-Drive Racing Oreca run by TDS. At Le Mans, the P1/01 driven by Oliver Webb was forced to retire after debris from the track impacted the front of the car on the opening lap, breaking the steering and damaging the bodywork. This subsequently lead to the engine overheating whenever the car was sent back out. Ultimately, the car became the first retirement of the race. In its final race of the season at Nurburgring, the P1/01 came in 14th overall and 5th in class. Following this race, Team ByKolles decided to retire for the remainder of the season to focus on improving for the 2018-2019 season due to new LMP1 entries from Rebellion, SMP and Ginetta.

| Year | Nat. | Entrant | Class | Nat. | Drivers | Rds. | Rounds | | | | | | | | | Points | WEP pos. |
| Year | Nat. | Entrant | Class | Nat. | Drivers | Rds. | 1 | 2 | 3 | 4 | 5 | 6 | 7 | 8 | 9 | Points | WEP pos. |
|---|---|---|---|---|---|---|---|---|---|---|---|---|---|---|---|---|---|
| 2017 | (Austria) | ByKolles Racing Team | LMP1 | (Austria) (United Kingdom) (United Kingdom) (Italy) | Dominik Kraihamer; Oliver Webb; James Rossiter; Marco Bonanomi | 1–4; 1–4; 1–2; 3-4 | SIL; Ret | SPA; 6 | LMN; Ret | NUR; 5 | MEX | COA | FUJ | SHA | BHR | N/A | NC |

=== 2018–2019 season ===
The P1/01 came into the 2018-2019 super season relatively unchanged. It retained the Nismo VRX30A engine. Unlike the previous season, the P1/01 was not the only LMP1 non hybrid entry, being joined by Rebellion's R-13, SMP and Dragonspeed's BR Engineering BR1s and CEFC TRSM Racing's Ginetta G60-LT-P1. Despite this, a privateer LMP1 team championship was still unavailable. At the first round of the season at Spa-Francorchamps, the P1/01 managed to finish in 4th place overall (2nd among privateer teams) after several other of the privateer LMP1s had issues affecting their ability to finish the race. At Le Mans, the P1/01 was forced to retire after Dominik Kraihamer collided with the #80 Ebimotors GTE-Am Porche while attempting to pass it at the Porsche curves. The car then made heavy impact with the wall, damaging it beyond repair for the race, continuing the car's bad luck at Le Mans. At Silverstone, the P1/01 was forced to retire again after a spin rendered the car inoperable. The P1/01 finished in 5th place overall (3rd among privateer teams) behind the #3 Rebellion Racing and #11 SMP Racing Entry at the Fuji round. At Shanghai, the car had to be retired after engine issues caused it to stop on the main straight.

In early February of 2019, it was announced that ByKolles would be missing the 1000 Miles of Sebring after a dispute with Nissan, their engine supplier, over performance and payment of the Nismo VRX30A engine. It was also implied that the team was considering a change in engine suppliers going forward. On February 15, ByKolles officially announced that they had changed engine suppliers, opting to drop the Nissan Nismo VRX30A in favor of the Gibson GL458 4.5 litre V8, the same engine powering Rebellion's R13s and DragonSpeed's BR Engineering BR1.

| Year | Nat. | Entrant | Class | Nat. | Drivers | Rds. | Rounds | | | | | | | | Points | WEP pos. |
| Year | Nat. | Entrant | Class | Nat. | Drivers | Rds. | 1 | 2 | 3 | 4 | 5 | 6 | 7 | 8 | Points | WEP pos. |
|---|---|---|---|---|---|---|---|---|---|---|---|---|---|---|---|---|
| 2018-2019 | (Austria) | ByKolles Racing Team | LMP1 | (Austria) (United Kingdom) (United Kingdom) (Austria) (France) (Italy) | Dominik Kraihamer; Oliver Webb; James Rossiter; René Binder; Tom Dillmann; Paolo Ruberti | 1–2; 1–5, 7-8; 4-5; 3; 1-2, 4-5, 7-8; 7-8 | SPA; 4 | LMN; DNF | SIL; DNF | FUJ; 5 | SHA; DNF | SEB | SPA; 7 | LMN; DNF | 22.5 | 4th |

=== 2019–2020 season ===
Ahead of the 2019 24 Hours of Le Mans, team owner Colin Kolles announced that the team would not be participating in the full WEC season, and would instead participate in selected races, including the 24 Hours of Le Mans, as the team sought to develop a new car for the Le Mans Hypercar regulations. Initially, the team's entry for the 2020 Le Mans was placed on the reserve list, before being promoted following the withdrawal of the SRT41 Garage 56 entry, and the Porsche North America GTE-Pro entries. Prior to the Automobile Club I'Ouest's confirmation of the team's promotion to the official entry list, the team resumed its testing programme with a new Le Mans aero package.

The team entered the 2020 6 Hours of Spa-Francorchamps in preparation for the 24 Hours of Le Mans, with Oliver Webb, Tom Dillmann and Bruno Spengler driving the ENSO CLM, in the car's Le Mans-style low-downforce aero kit. The team qualified 4th overall for the race, but finished in 27th overall, 14 laps down on the winning Toyota TS050 Hybrid.

| Year | Nat. | Entrant | Class | Nat. | Drivers | Rds. | Rounds | | | | | | | | Points | WEP pos. |
| Year | Nat. | Entrant | Class | Nat. | Drivers | Rds. | 1 | 2 | 3 | 4 | 5 | 6 | 7 | 8 | Points | WEP pos. |
|---|---|---|---|---|---|---|---|---|---|---|---|---|---|---|---|---|
| 2019-2020 | (Austria) | ByKolles Racing Team | LMP1 | (France) (Canada) (United Kingdom) | Tom Dillmann; Bruno Spengler; Oliver Webb | 6-7; 6-7; 6-7 | SIL | FUJ | SHA | BAH | COA | SPA; 4 | LMN; DNF | BAH | N/A | NC |

=== 2024 ===
ByKolles entered the P1/01 in the closing round of the 2024 Masters Endurance Legends season at Mugello, with Christophe Bouchut driving the car and winning the first of the two races.

== Gallery ==
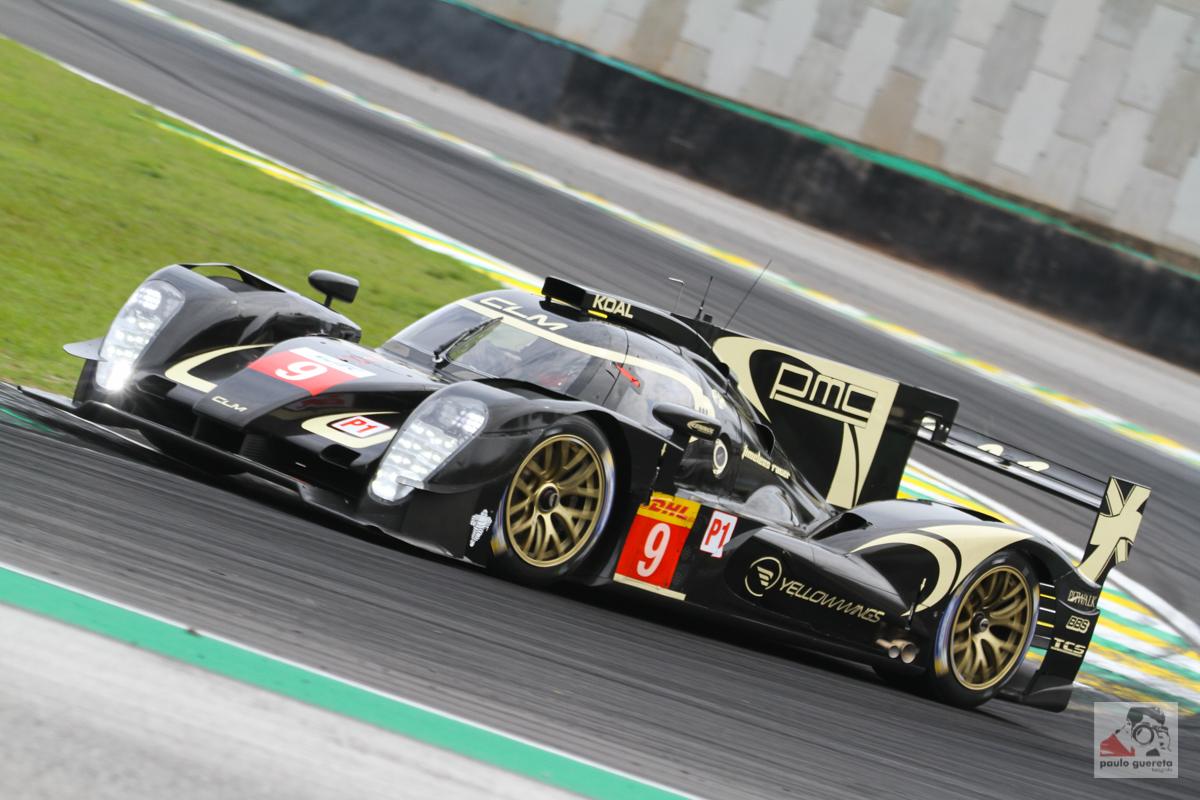
The No. 9 car entered by Lotus at the 2014 6 Hours of São Paulo

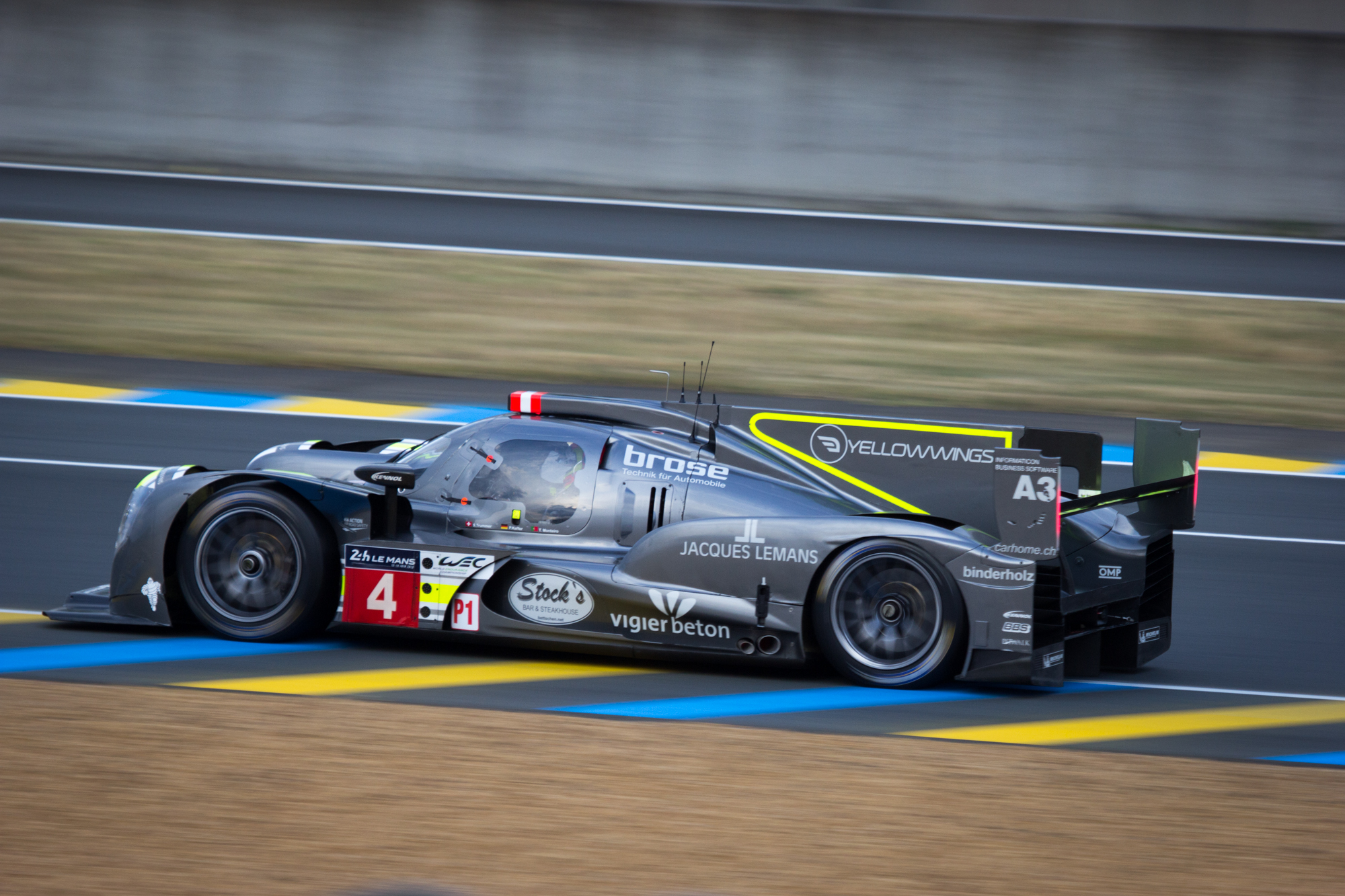
The No. 4 car entered by Team ByKolles at the 2015 24 Hours of Le Mans

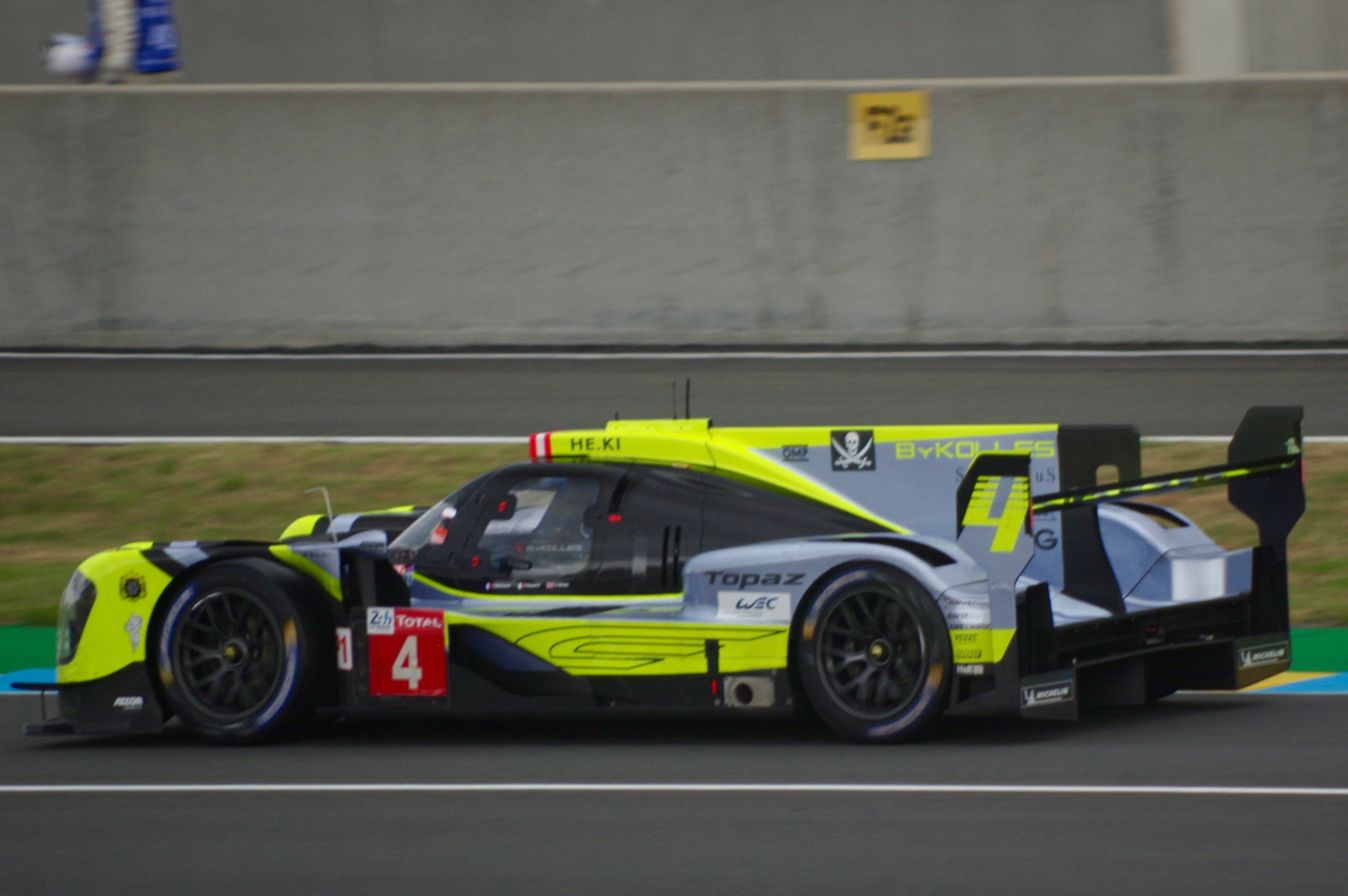
The No. 4 car entered by ByKolles Racing at the 2019 24 Hours of Le Mans

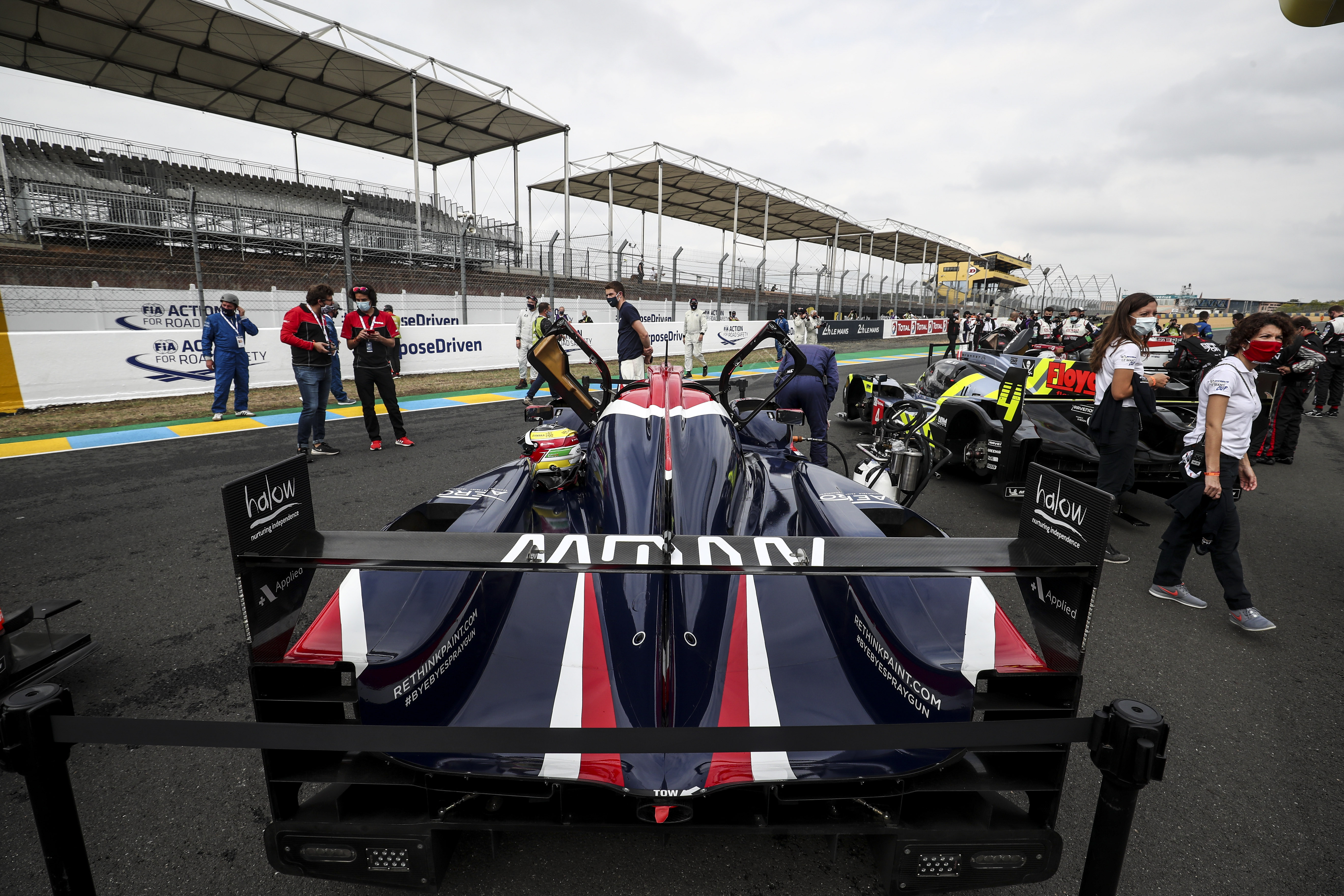
The No. 4 car at the 2020 24 Hours of Le Mans starting grid
