= Nissan VRX30A engine =

Overview
- Manufacturer: Nissan
- Production: 2015–2018

Layout
- Configuration: V6, twin-turbocharged, 60° cylinder angle
- Displacement: 3.0 L (2,998 cc)
- Cylinder bore: 88 mm (3.46 in)
- Piston stroke: 82.2 mm (3.24 in)
- Cylinder block material: Aluminium
- Cylinder head material: Aluminium
- Valvetrain: 24-valve (four-valves per cylinder), DOHC
- Valvetrain drive system: Gears

Combustion
- Fuel system: Gasoline direct injection
- Management: Cosworth
- Fuel type: Shell V-Power LM24
- Oil system: Dry sump
- Cooling system: Water cooled

Output
- Power output: 500 hp (373 kW; 507 PS)

The Nissan VRX30A engine is a twin-turbocharged, four-stroke, 3.0-liter, V6 racing engine, jointly designed and produced by Nissan and Cosworth for use in the Nissan GT-R LM Nismo, and later the CLM P1/01, from 2015 to 2018.

== Overview ==
The VRX30A was designed in partnership by Nissan and Cosworth, who used the GT-R GT500 NRE engine as a "general philosophy". The car was originally planning to produce 2,000 hp (1,500 kW; 2,000 PS), but this was reduced, with the engine pushing out roughly 500 hp (370 kW; 510 PS). The engine has a capacity of 3.0 L (2,998 cc) with a bore of 88 mm (3.46 in) and stroke of 82.2 mm (3.24 in). It is twin-turbocharged, features gasoline direct injection and is managed by a Cosworth engine control unit.

== Applications ==
- CLM P1/01
- Nissan GT-R LM Nismo
