= 2015 6 Hours of Nürburgring =

Sports car endurance race in Germany

(Germany) 2015 6 Hours of Nürburgring
Event information
- Round 4 of 8 in the 2015 FIA World Endurance Championship
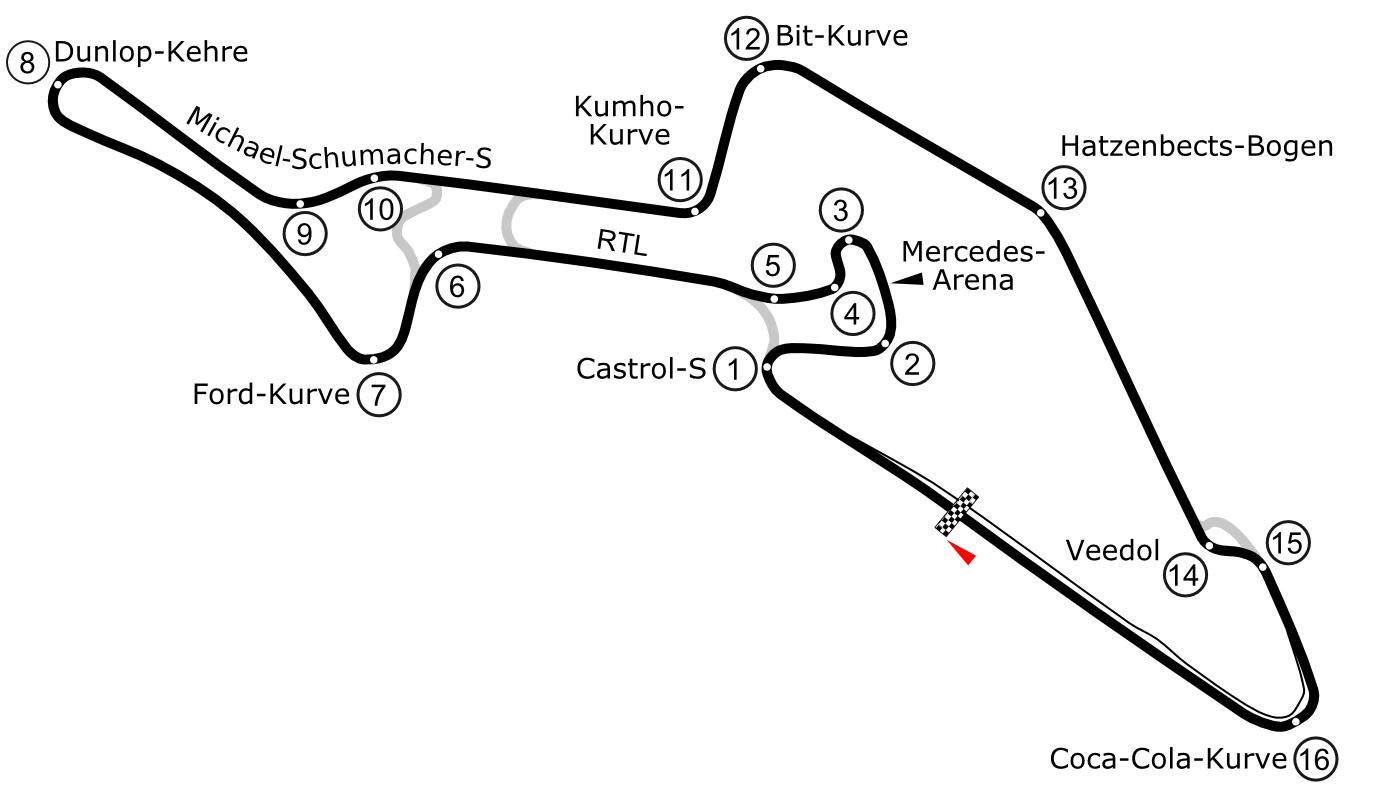
- Date: 30 August 2015
- Location: Nürburg
- Venue: Nürburgring
- Duration: 6 Hours

Results
- Laps completed: 203
- Distance (km): 1042.811
- Distance (miles): 647.976
- LMP1

Pole position
- Time: 1:36.473
- Team: (Germany) Porsche Team
- Drivers: (France) Romain Dumas (Germany) Marc Lieb

Winners
- Team: (Germany) Porsche Team
- Drivers: (Germany) Timo Bernhard (New Zealand) Brendon Hartley (Australia) Mark Webber
- LMP2

Winners
- Team: (Hong Kong) KCMG
- Drivers: (United Kingdom) Richard Bradley (United Kingdom) Matthew Howson (United Kingdom) Nick Tandy
- LMGTE Pro

Winners
- Team: (Germany) Porsche Team Manthey
- Drivers: (Denmark) Michael Christensen (Austria) Richard Lietz
- LMGTE Am

Winners
- Team: (Russia) SMP Racing
- Drivers: (Russia) Aleksey Basov (Italy) Andrea Bertolini (Russia) Viktor Shaytar

The 2015 6 Hours of Nürburgring was a six-hour endurance sports car racing event held for Le Mans Prototype and Le Mans Grand Touring Endurance cars at the Nürburgring, Nürburg, Germany on 28–30 August 2015. Nürburgring served as the fourth round of the 2015 FIA World Endurance Championship, and it marked the inaugural running of the event as part of the championship. A total of 62,000 people attended the race weekend.

The No. 18 Porsche of Marc Lieb, Romain Dumas and Neel Jani qualified in pole position by recording the fastest lap in qualifying and maintained the lead until it was issued with multiple penalties relating to excessive fuel consumption at its first pit stop and the consequence of this allowed the sister Porsche of Timo Bernhard, Brendon Hartley and Mark Webber to move to the front of the field. The car kept the lead through the following sequence of pit stops and Webber drove the Porsche across the start/finish line at the end of the race to claim his, Bernhard and Hartley's first outright victories in the World Endurance Championship. Jani and later Lieb fended off the advances from the two rival Audis to secure second and the podium was completed by the No. 7 Audi R18 e-tron quattro of André Lotterer, Marcel Fässler and Benoît Tréluyer.

The Le Mans Prototype 2 (LMP2) category was won by the No. 47 KCMG Oreca 05 of Matthew Howson, Richard Bradley and Nick Tandy . The car held the lead in the class for the majority of the race to secure its second consecutive victory of the season and was followed by the No. 26 G-Drive Racing car of Roman Rusinov, Julien Canal and Sam Bird. Richard Lietz and Michael Christensen in the No. 92 Porsche 911 RSR took the victory in the Le Mans Grand Tourer Endurance Professional (LMGTE Pro) class with the sister car driven by Patrick Pilet and Frédéric Makowiecki taking second despite the duo serving two penalties during the course of the race. The podium in the category was completed by the No. 71 AF Corse Ferrari 458 Italia GTE of Davide Rigon and James Calado. The Le Mans Grand Tourer Endurance Amateur (LMGTE Am) category was led for the final half an hour by the No. 72 SMP Racing Ferrari of Viktor Shaytar, Aleskey Bakov and Andrea Bertolini who held it to clinch the class victory, ahead of the No. 98 Aston Martin V8 Vantage GTE of Paul Dalla Lana, Pedro Lamy and Mathias Lauda.

The result of the race reduced Lotterer, Fässler and Tréluyer's Drivers' Championship by three points to the outright race winners Bernhard, Hartley and Webber who moved up three places to lie in second. Lieb, Dumas and Jani moved from fourth to third while Tandy dropped to fourth after finishing seventh in the overall classification. Earl Bamber and the absent Nico Hülkenberg rounded out the top five. Porsche increased its lead in the Manufacturers' Championship on 184 points, thirty-three ahead of Audi and a further 62 in front of Toyota with four rounds left in the season.

== Background ==
=== Entry list ===
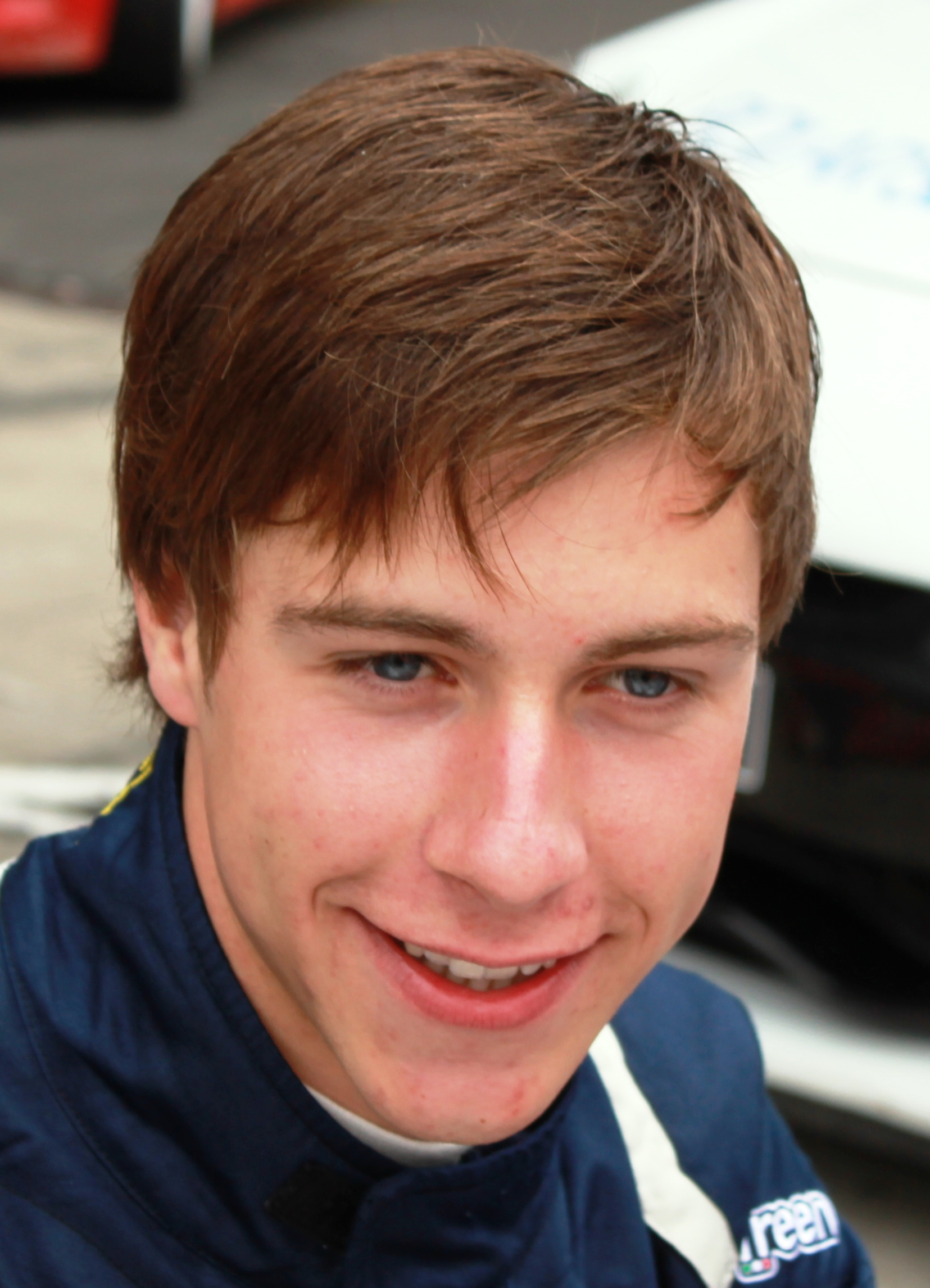
Zoël Amberg (pictured in 2012) was withdrawn on medical grounds and replaced by the International GT Open driver Archie Hamilton.

A total of thirty-one cars were officially entered for the 6 Hours of Nürburgring, with the bulk of the entries in Le Mans Prototype 1 (LMP1) and Le Mans Prototype 2 (LMP2). Three manufacturers, Porsche, Toyota and Audi Sport Team Joest, were represented in LMP1 by two cars each. Rebellion Racing and Team ByKolles were the two representatives of the privateer field. Three weeks prior, Nissan announced their decision to delay their return to the FIA World Endurance Championship (WEC) so they could address energy recovery system faults with their two GT-R LM Nismos and resume their testing programme in the United States.

LMP2 consisted of eight cars with 24 drivers. Starting at the Nürburgring, Strakka Racing switched from running a Dome S103 to a Gibson 015S for the rest of the season. This was so the team could use the Dome S103 for testing and developing in preparation for a planned entry to LMP1 in 2017. OAK Racing pulled their No. 35 Ligier JS P2 Nissan from the entry list for unspecified reasons. Zoël Amberg was withdrawn on medical grounds which were believed to be related from a crash he suffered at the Monaco GP2 Series round three months prior. Amberg's place in the No. 43 Team SARD Morand Morgan was taken by the International GT Open driver Archie Hamilton. After driving the No. 19 Porsche 919 Hybrid at Spa-Francorchamps and Le Mans, Nick Tandy returned to KCMG for the first time since the season-opening round at Silverstone.

The Le Mans Grand Touring Endurance Professional (LMGTE Pro) field consisted of three manufacturers (Aston Martin, Ferrari and Porsche), while the Le Mans Grand Touring Endurance Amateur (LMGTE Am) entrants were six teams: Aston Martin Racing, AF Corse, Larbre Compétition, Dempsey-Racing Proton, Porsche Team Manthley, and SMP Racing. British GT racer Jonny Adam made his first appearance in the season in the No. 97 Aston Martin Vantage GTE and he was paired with regular drivers Darren Turner and Stefan Mücke. Le Mans outright winner and United SportsCar Championship competitor Earl Bamber returned to the World Endurance Championship to drive the No. 88 Proton Racing Porsche 911 RSR, replacing Klaus Bachler, who had an ADAC GT Masters commitment at the Sachsenring. After fracturing two vertebrae in a heavy accident at Le Mans, Roald Goethe, the co-driver of the No. 96 Aston Martin, was declared fit to compete at the Nürburgring.

=== Preview ===
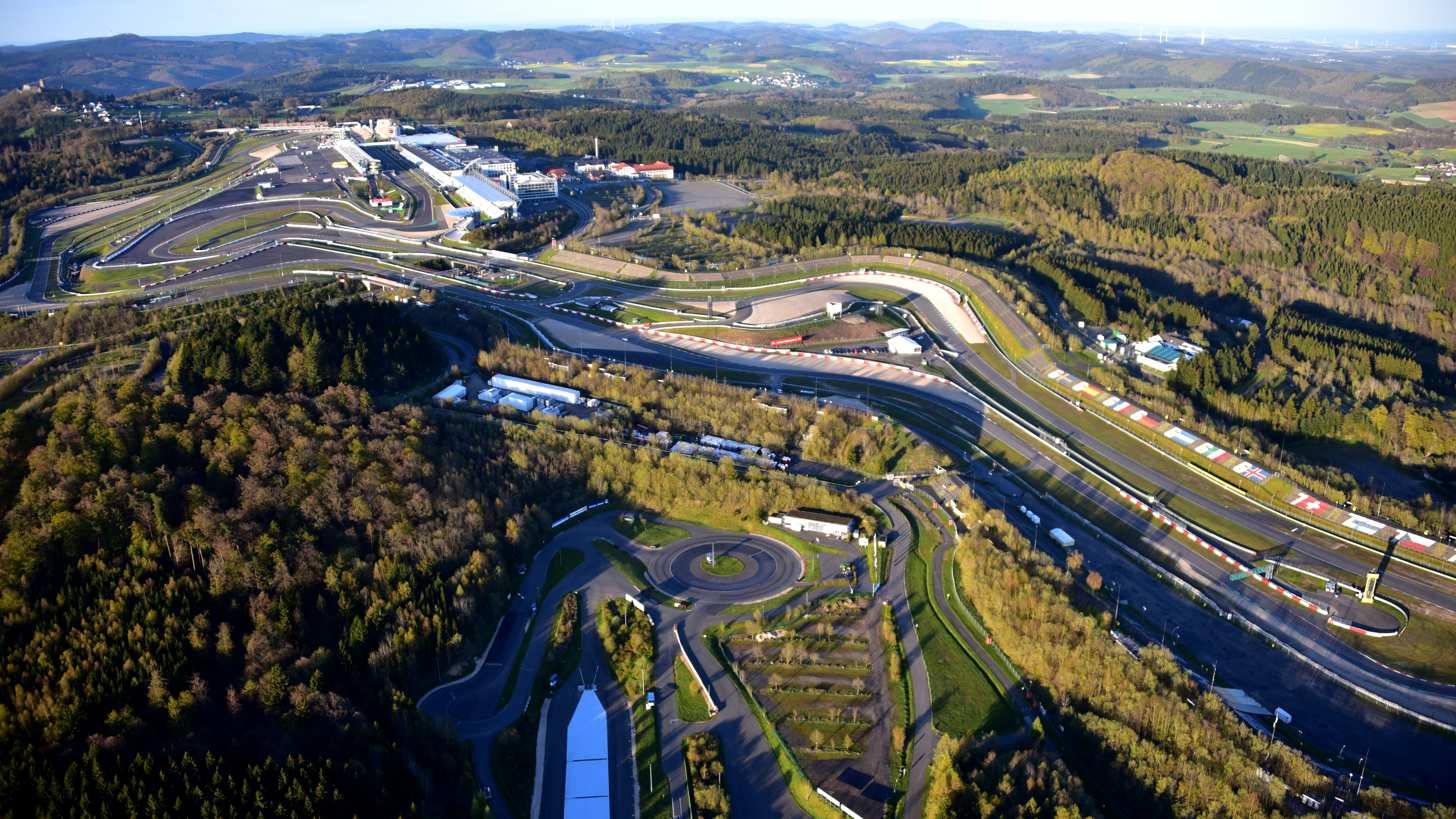
The Nürburgring GP-Strecke, where the race was held.

The 6 Hours of Nürburgring was confirmed as part of the FIA World Endurance Championship's 2015 schedule in an FIA World Motor Sport Council meeting in Doha on 3 December 2014. It was the fourth of eight scheduled endurance sports car races of the 2015 FIA World Endurance Championship, and the inaugural running of the race as part of the championship. It was held on 30 August 2015 at the Nürburgring GP-Strecke circuit in Nürburg, Germany following two days of practice and qualifying. The race was the first world sports car championship round to be held at the circuit since the 1991 430 km of Nürburgring, and took place on a modified version of the 16-turn 5.148-kilometre (3.199 mi) layout which lacked the Veedol chicane.

Before the race Audi Sport Team Joest drivers André Lotterer, Benoît Tréluyer and Marcel Fässler led the Drivers' Championship with 80 points, twenty ahead of nearest rival Tandy in second place, and a further two in front of Bamber and the non-competing Nico Hülkenberg. Marc Lieb, Romain Dumas and Neel Jani were fourth on 57 points and Timo Bernhard, Mark Webber and Brendon Hartley followed in fifth position on 53 points. Porsche led the Manufacturers' Championship with 140 points, sixteen points ahead of their rival Audi in second place. The third-placed manufacturer Toyota had scored 71 points and Nissan rounded out the top four but had yet to accumulate any points. Audi dominated the season's opening two rounds and Porsche won the 24 Hours of Le Mans. The trio of Lieb, Dumas and Jani secured two consecutive second-place finishes and their teammates Bernhard, Webber and Hartley placed second at Le Mans.

After Le Mans, the FIA Endurance Committee altered the balance of performance in the GTE categories, reducing the size of the air restrictor on the air intake of the Aston Martin Vantage engines by 0.5 millimetres (0.020 in) and lowering the weight of the Porsche 911 RSRs in LMGTE Pro by 10 kilograms (22 lb) and 15 kilograms (33 lb) was removed from the LMGTE Am version of the car. Similarly, the Chevrolet Corvette C7.R in both GTE classes had its fuel capacity increased by 5 litres (1.1 imp gal; 1.3 US gal) and were mandated to install a larger refuelling restrictor. The Ferrari 458 Italia GTEs in LMGTE Am had a weight increase of 15 kilograms (33 lb). In the LMP1 Equivalence of Technology alterations, the Porsche 919 Hybrid and Toyota TS040 Hybrid had their petrol energy lowered by 2.2% and their maximum petrol fuel load by 1.6%. In contrast, the diesel energy of the Audi R18 e-tron quattro was increased by 0.44% and its maximum diesel flow was increased by 0.63%. The LMP1 fuel capacity of petrol-powered engines was lowered from 68.3 litres (15.0 imp gal; 18.0 US gal) to 67.4 litres (14.8 imp gal; 17.8 US gal). Similarly, Audi's diesel-powered engine had its fuel capacity reduced from 54.2 litres (11.9 imp gal; 14.3 US gal) to 53.7 litres (11.8 imp gal; 14.2 US gal).

== Practice ==
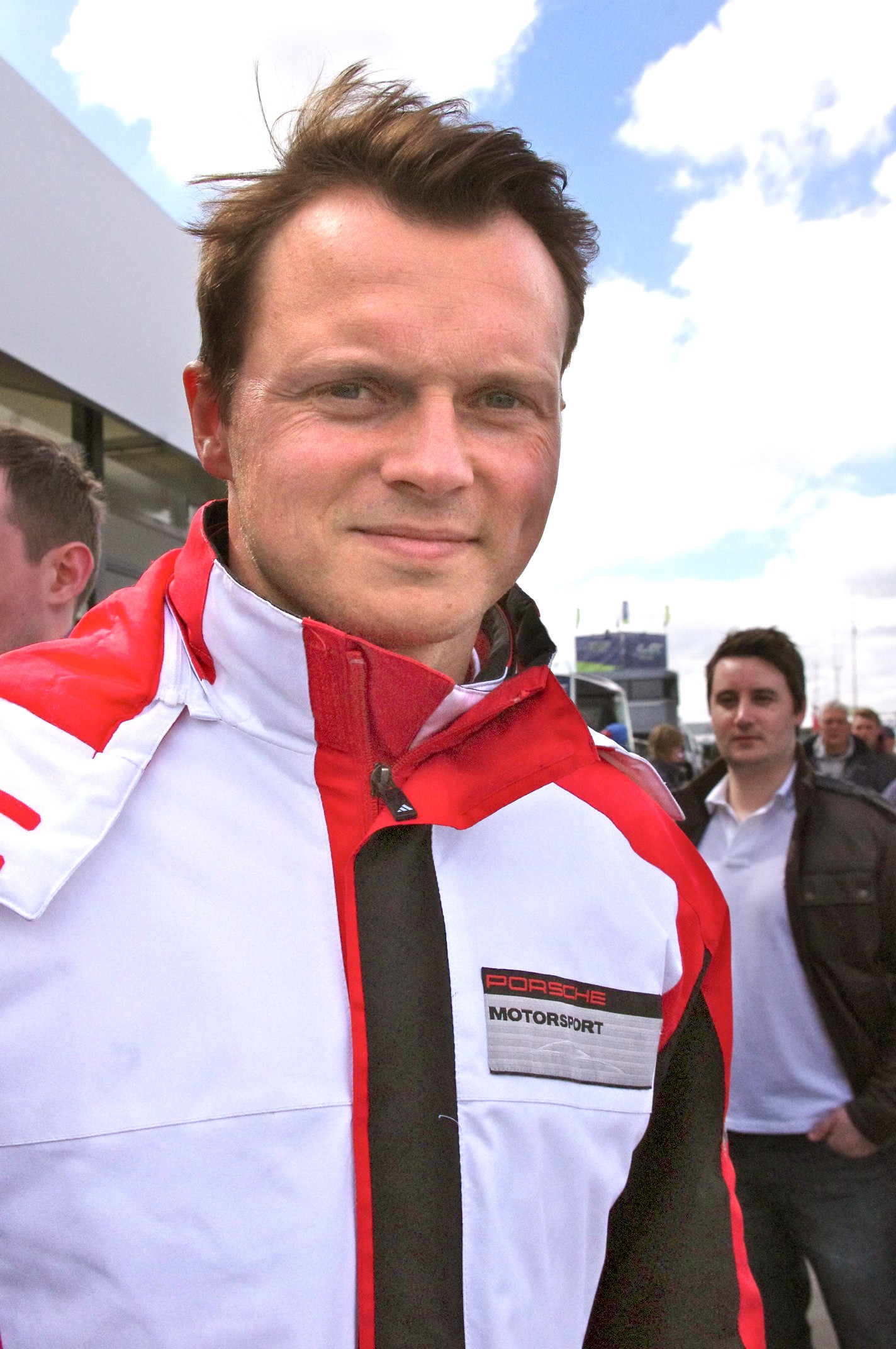
Marc Lieb (pictured in 2014) was the fastest driver in the event's three practice sessions.

There were three practice sessions—one 90-minute session each on Friday afternoon and early evening and a one-hour session on Saturday morning—preceding Sunday's race. The first practice session began on a damp track after some rain had fallen shortly before it started and this made drivers wary on their first attempts. Lap times lowered when the rain let up. The No. 7 Audi of Lotterer led the session in its latter half with the fastest lap time at 1:39.201, 0.076 seconds faster than any other car on the track. His closest challenger was Jani in the No. 18 Porsche and Loïc Duval's No. 8 Audi followed in third place. Bernhard was fourth in the other Porsche and the quickest Toyota came fifth after a lap from Stéphane Sarrazin. LMP2 was led by Gustavo Yacamán's No. 28 G-Drive Racing car with a lap of 1:46.631 set late in practice and was a second clear from teammate Sam Bird. Gianmaria Bruni's No. 51 Ferrari was quickest in LMGTE Pro while the No. 83 car of Rui Águas helped the team to the top of the time sheets in LMGTE Am. While the session passed relatively peacefully, several cars slid off on the slippery tarmac and the session was stopped when Simon Trummer spun the No. 4 ByKolles CLM P1/01 into the final turn's gravel trap.

The track was dry for the second practice session which had Tréluyer record the fastest time of the day late at 1:37.862 despite going into the turn one gravel trap. Webber finished with the second-quickest time; his teammate Jani was third and Duval placed fourth. Toyota were still off the pace with their fastest lap coming from driver Mike Conway who was three seconds adrift in fifth position. Lucas di Grassi removed the rear wing of the No. 8 Audi in an impact with the final turn tyre wall after hitting the inside kerb. Bird was the early pace setter in LMP2 and later improved on his fastest time to finish at the top of the time sheets with a lap of 1:46.299 that put him almost a second and a half clear of teammate Pipo Derani. LMGTE Pro was led by Richie Stanaway's No. 99 Aston Martin and the SMP Racing Ferrari of Viktor Shaytar was fastest in LMGTE Am with a benchmark lap.

The third (and final) practice session started with Dumas being the early pace setter and later improved on his effort. His co-driver Lieb then went faster with a lap of 1:36.036 and remained at the top of the time sheets until the end of the session. His teammate Webber followed six-tenths of a second behind in second and the quickest Audi was the No. 8 car of di Grassi in third. Fässler was fourth-fastest despite spinning at slow speed at turn two and Sébastien Buemi rounded out the top five. Dumas made contact with the left-rear section of François Perrodo's car at turn two which led to a punctured tyre; both drivers were forced to the pit lane for repairs. Derani was the early pace setter in LMP2 but Jonny Kane set the fastest class time of the weekend so far at 1:45.270, and Tandy was almost one-tenth of a second behind in second. Aston Martin and Porsche battled for the fastest time in LMGTE Pro until Bruni topped the time sheets and Bamber set an early benchmark which put him fastest in LMGTE Am. Paul Dalla Lana locked his tyres and his tyre failed but was recovered for transportation back to the pit lane.

== Qualifying ==
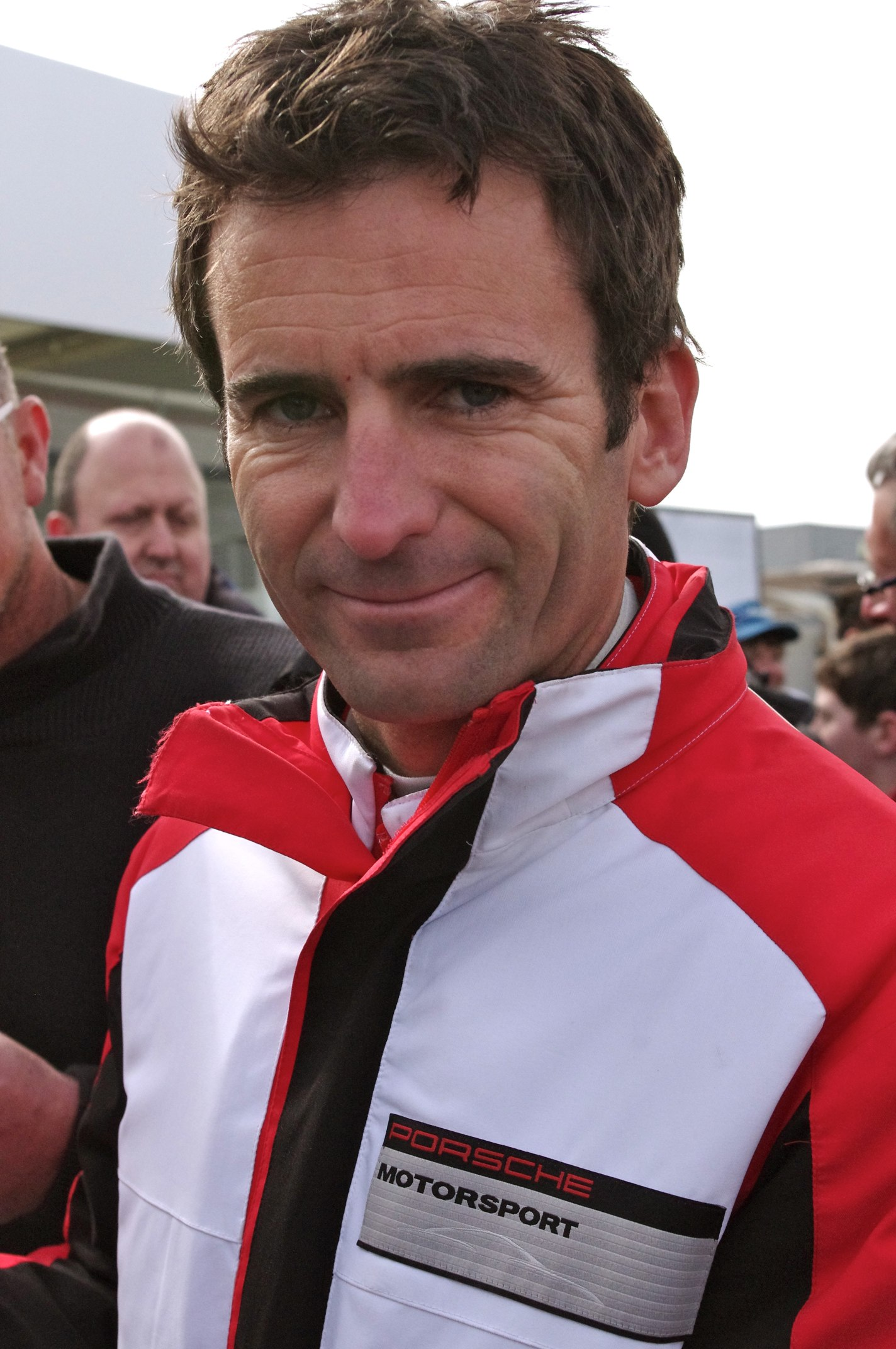
Romain Dumas (pictured in 2014) helped clinch the No. 18 Porsche's second consecutive pole position of 2015.

Saturday's afternoon qualification session was divided into two groups lasting 20 minutes each. Cars in LMGTE Pro and AM were sent out first and, after a five-minute interval, LMP1 and LMP2 vehicles drove onto the track. All cars were required to be driven by two participants for one timed lap each, with the starting order determined by the competitors' fastest average times. The fastest qualifier was awarded one point towards the Drivers' and Manufacturers' Championships. Lieb and Bernhard immediately put the two Porsches with their lap times in the low 1:36 range and the Audis of Oliver Jarvis and Fässler followed in the next two positions. Webber was delayed by slower traffic on his opening lap but recovered to improve the No. 17 car's average lap time to put it on top. Shortly after, Dumas improved to maintain Porsche's 100% pole position record and took the No. 18 car's second consecutive pole position of 2015 with a two-lap average time of 1:36.473.

They were joined on the grid's front row by the sister No. 17 car as Webber and Bernhard's combined lap times were 0.069 seconds behind Lieb and Dumas. The two Audis were third and fourth (the No. 8 car driven by di Grassi and Jarvis in front of the No. 7 vehicle of Lotterer and Fässler). Lotterer was slightly delayed by slower traffic on his fastest timed lap. Toyota was slightly closer towards the pace in qualifying and filled the third row of the grid. Anthony Davidson and Buemi were nominated to qualify the No. 1 Toyota and had no issues. In contrast, Alexander Wurz in the sister Toyota made an error and went into the gravel trap leaving the final turn. Sarrazin had new tyres installed on his car but was delayed by two slower cars and lost time as a consequence. The two Rebellion Racing cars and the No. 4 ByKolles CLM/01 rounded out the LMP1 qualifiers.

In LMP2, Tandy and Matthew Howson took the fastest two-lap average time of 1:46.505 late in the session. The duo were then three-tenths of a second faster than the No. 26 G-Drive Racing Oreca of Julien Canal and Bird with Nelson Panciatici and Vincent Capillaire putting the No. 26 Signatech Alpine car in third. The second G-Drive Racing car was fourth and the Team SARD Morand entry rounded out the top five. Ricardo González spun leaving the Dunlop hairpin but did not make contact with the barriers and was able to continue. Toni Vilander and Bruni, competing in the No. 71 Ferrari, were the fastest LMGTE Pro drivers with a two-lap average time of 1:54.275, and took AF Corse first pole position since the 2014 6 Hours of Circuit of the Americas. They qualified 0.055 seconds in front of the sister Ferrari driven by James Calado and Davide Rigon. The Danish pairing of Marco Sørensen and Christoffer Nygaard in the No. 95 Aston Martin took third and the two Porsche GTEs rounded out the top five. The Russian duo of Viktor Shaytar and Aleksey Basov took the pole position in LMGTE Am, half a second faster than the second-placed qualifier, the No. 98 Aston Martin. Dalla Lana stopped on track in the closing seconds of qualifying due to a throttle problem but was able to restart.

=== Qualifying results ===
Pole position winners in each class are denoted in bold.

Final qualifying classification
Pos	Class	Team	Average Time	Grid
**1**	**LMP1**	**No. 18 Porsche Team**	**1:36.473**	**1**
2	LMP1	No. 17 Porsche Team	1:36.542	2
3	LMP1	No. 8 Audi Sport Team Joest	1:37.476	3
4	LMP1	No. 7 Audi Sport Team Joest	1:37.783	4
5	LMP1	No. 1 Toyota Racing	1:38.689	5
6	LMP1	No. 2 Toyota Racing	1:39.371	6
7	LMP1	No. 12 Rebellion Racing	1:42.513	7
8	LMP1	No. 13 Rebellion Racing	1:42.985	8
9	LMP1	No. 4 Team ByKolles	1:44.886	9
**10**	**LMP2**	**No. 47 KCMG**	**1:46.132**	**10**
11	LMP2	No. 26 G-Drive Racing	1:46.505	11
12	LMP2	No. 36 Signatech Alpine	1:47.174	12
13	LMP2	No. 28 G-Drive Racing	1:47.179	13
14	LMP2	No. 43 Team SARD Morand	1:47.572	14
15	LMP2	No. 42 Strakka Racing	1:48.250	15
16	LMP2	No. 30 Extreme Speed Motorsports	1:48.342	16
17	LMP2	No. 31 Extreme Speed Motorsports	1:50.594	17
**18**	**LMGTE Pro**	**No. 51 AF Corse**	**1:54.275**	**18**
19	LMGTE Pro	No. 71 AF Corse	1:54.330	19
20	LMGTE Pro	No. 95 Aston Martin Racing	1:54.498	20
21	LMGTE Pro	No. 92 Porsche Team Manthey	1:54.688	21
22	LMGTE Pro	No. 91 Porsche Team Manthey	1:54.729	22
23	LMGTE Pro	No. 99 Aston Martin Racing V8	1:54.933	23
24	LMGTE Pro	No. 97 Aston Martin Racing	1:55.387	24
**25**	**LMGTE Am**	**No. 72 SMP Racing**	**1:56.528**	**25**
26	LMGTE Am	No. 98 Aston Martin Racing	1:57.060	26
27	LMGTE Am	No. 77 Dempsey Racing-Proton	1:57.232	27
28	LMGTE Am	No. 83 AF Corse	1:57.246	28
29	LMGTE Am	No. 88 Abu Dhabi-Proton Racing	1:57.563	29
30	LMGTE Am	No. 50 Larbre Compétition	1:57.647	30
31	LMGTE Am	No. 96 Aston Martin Racing	1:59.993	31

== Race ==
Weather conditions at the start were dry and sunny. The air temperature was between 28 and 30.2 °C (82.4 and 86.4 °F) and the track temperature ranged from 27 to 39 °C (81 to 102 °F). 62,000 people attended the race weekend. The race started at 13:00 Central European Summer Time (UTC+02:00). On the second formation lap, the No. 13 Rebellion R-One of Alexandre Imperatori was forced to enter the pit lane for an engine problem which necessitated repairs by team mechanics. Jani maintained his pole position advantage heading into the first corner with teammate Bernhard following in second. Shaytar made a poor getaway and fell to third in LMGTE Am behind the two Porsches of Bamber and Patrick Long. Upfront, Jani opened up his advantage to three seconds by the start of the third lap, while Frédéric Makowiecki moved in front of Sørensen for third in LMGTE Pro. Stanaway made slight contact with teammate Mücke while passing him for sixth and the latter then fell behind Long. Makowiecki was later adjudged by the stewards to have jumped the start and they handed him a drive-through penalty after eight minutes, promoting his teammate Michael Christensen into third in class. The first change of position in LMP2 came 15 minutes in when Derani overtook Panciatici on the outside for third.

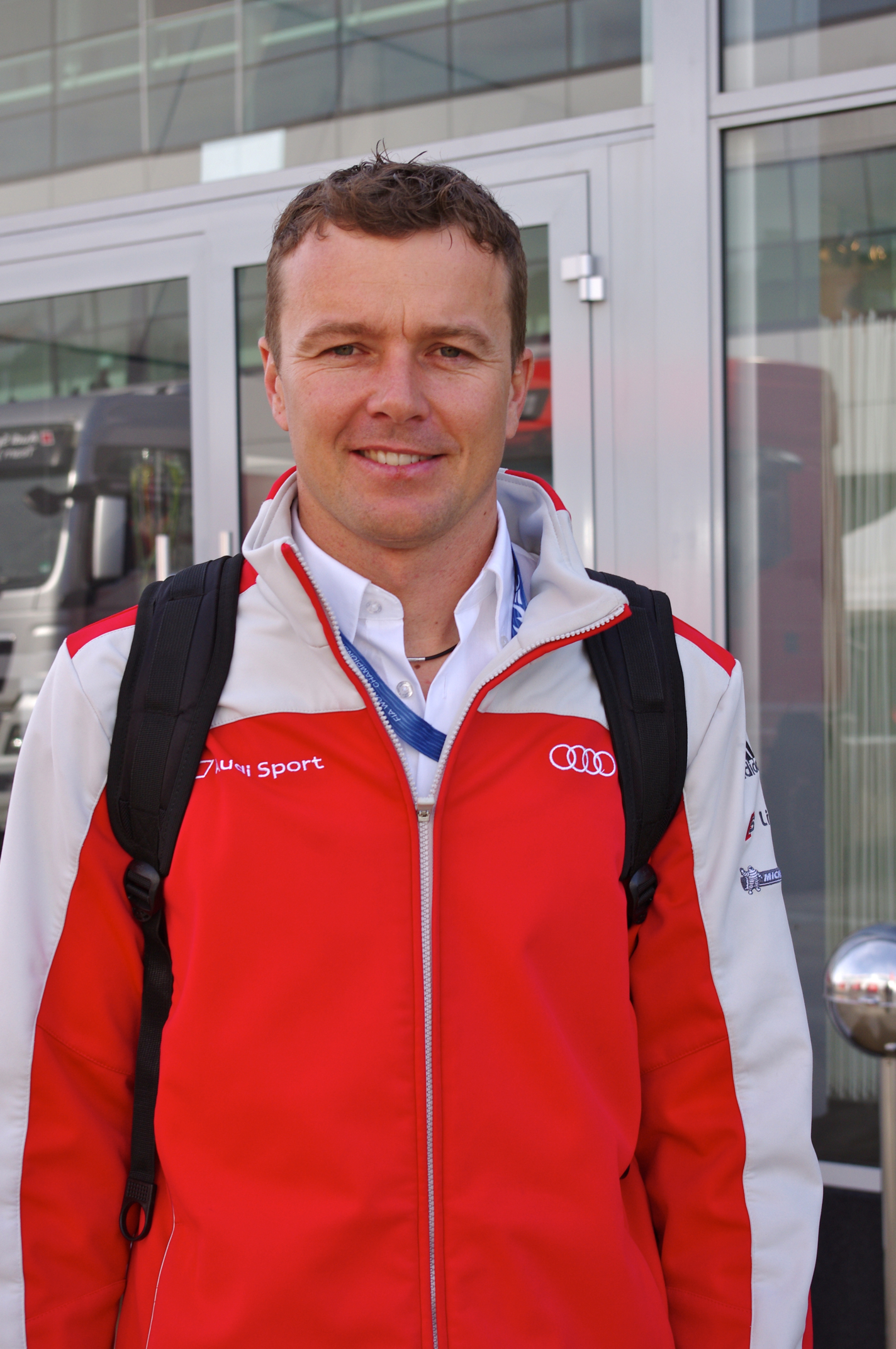
Marcel Fässler (pictured in 2013) duelled with the No..17 Porsche in the opening hours of the race.

Bruni slowed with an electrical fault and then stopped on track at the Dunlop hairpin which led to the activation of the full course yellow procedure and his teammate Calado took over the lead of LMGTE Pro. Racing resumed five minutes later after Bruni's car was extracted from the circuit by a recovery truck but he managed to restart. Both Audis of Duval and Fässler sought to close up to Jani but their challenge was halted when they negotiated their way through slower traffic. Calado had a problem with his vehicle, allowing Christensen to the front of LMGTE Pro and Stanaway moved into second. After a few laps, Duval and Fässler drew close to Bernhard, while Kane moved past Oliver Webb for fifth in LMP2 and began putting pressure on Panciatici for fourth in class. Makowiecki started to regain positions by overtaking Mücke for fifth in LMGTE Pro and Emmanuel Collard lost third to Pedro Lamy. Collard then fell to fourth when Paolo Ruberti moved in front of him. The first round of pit stops for driver changes began after 44 minutes when Bernhard and Fässler drove into the pit lane as both had slow punctures. At the start of the 23rd lap in LMGTE Am, Lamy gained another place when he overtook Shaytar around the outside at the first corner for second after minor contact between the two cars.

After the pit stops, Lieb kept the lead and Fässler moved to second after Webber relieved Bernhard and the No. 18 Porsche's front nose was replaced. The SARD Morgan of Webb got ahead of the Signatech Alpine and Strakka Gibson for fourth in LMP2 and Kane passed the Alpine for fifth in class. Nick Heidfeld had a sudden loss in power in his No. 12 Rebellion R-One due to debris becoming lodged in the master switch which shut down the car and activated the fire extinguisher on the start/finish straight. Heidfeld was able to restart the vehicle and returned to the pit lane for a change of fire extinguisher. Kane made a driving error and ploughed into the gravel trap at the final corner and fell to seventh in LMP2. Pantciatici initially capitalised on Kane's error but a power fault with his car allowed Ryan Dalziel into a race-high of fifth in class. The GTE field made their pit stops for fuel, tyres and driver changes early in the second hour which had Richard Lietz retain the lead in LMGTE Pro with Rigon benefiting from fast work by his pit crew to move him to second in class. Bamber retook the LMGTE Am lead and Dalla Lana took over second place in the category. Webber drew close to Fässler and battled him for second. This ended when Webber passed Fässler around the inside at turn four as the duo drove towards the next complex of corners.

Tandy maintained a twenty-second advantage at the front of LMP2 and his fast speed allowed him to pass the ByKolles car for seventh overall. Webber began to pull clear from Fässler and was soon less than forty seconds behind teammate Lieb. However, the stewards handed Lieb a five-second stop-and-go penalty for excess fuel consumption at his pit stop because of a faulty sensor. Lieb took the pit stop five minutes later and emerged narrowly ahead of Webber in the sister No. 17 Porsche. This meant Lieb drove defensively heading out of the pit lane and forced Webber off the circuit at the second turn. Patrick Dempsey lost third to Perrordo in LMGTE Am and Dalla Lana and Khaled-Al Qubaisi ran closely behind each other until the latter fell back due to possibly being cautioned about track limits. The second round of pit stops for all LMP cars followed soon after with Tandy being replaced by Howson and Webber being relieved by Hartley. After the pit stops, Hartley had driven quickly to take over first place and the No. 26 car of Roman Rusinov held a nine-second advantage over Howson as a result of a faster stop. A second full course yellow was necessitated when Al-Qubaisi went into the gravel trap at the Dunlop hairpin and deposited gravel on the track which was cleared by course marshals.

Most of the GTE field made their pit stops slightly earlier than planned under the full course yellow. Once racing resumed, Dumas was catching Hartley but was twice penalised with a half a minute stop-and-go penalty and a one-minute infringement that he was mandated to serve on consecutive laps. Howson caught Rusinov and moved his way past him driving towards the first corner. After serving both his penalties, Dumas was two laps behind Hartley and was narrowly in front of the two Toyotas. By this point, Lauda was now leading LMGTE Am while Agias moved into second and Christian Ried was running third. Agias went off the track and fell behind Marco Seefried. Fourth-placed Andrea Bertolini lunged at Seefried at the first turn but ran deep at the corner's exit but overtook him soon after. Ried then lost fourth to Kristan Poulsen when the two Audis lapped them and Al-Quabisi spun at turn ten after sustaining heavy frontal damage. Race organisers activated the full course yellow procedure for the third time when Pierre Kaffer's rear wing on his ByKolles CLM/01 detached itself on the start/finish straight and landed on the racing line. Just as the full course yellow was necessitated, Makowiecki and Calado made contact leaving the Dunlop hairpin which led to the Ferrari's rear bodywork rubbing against its left-rear tyre.

As the race entered the final three hours, Yacaman moved in front of teammate Rusinov for second in LMP2, and Rigon was forced into the pit lane for a replacement tyre after his left-rear was punctured from the bodywork rubbing against it. Paul-Loup Chatin and Danny Watts were engaged in a battle for fifth place in LMP2 which ended in Watts's favour when he passed Chatin heading towards the first corner. Another round of pit stops followed after three hours and 28 minutes which had several changes of driver and three of the four class leaders keeping their positions except for Long who had one of his doors replaced because of a window fault design. González was heavily delayed by slower traffic and glanced the Larbre Compétition Corvette. This enabled Canal to take advantage of the situation and take over second in LMP2. Jani caught Jarvis and overtook him on the start/finish straight. Capillaire spun after going too fast heading into the Veedol chicane and the full course yellow was shown for the fourth time so marshals could clean the track. The leading Porsche and two Audis used the opportunity to make their pit stops while the No. 42 Strakka Racing car of Nick Leventis was pushed into its garage after its rear was damaged by an Aston Martin.

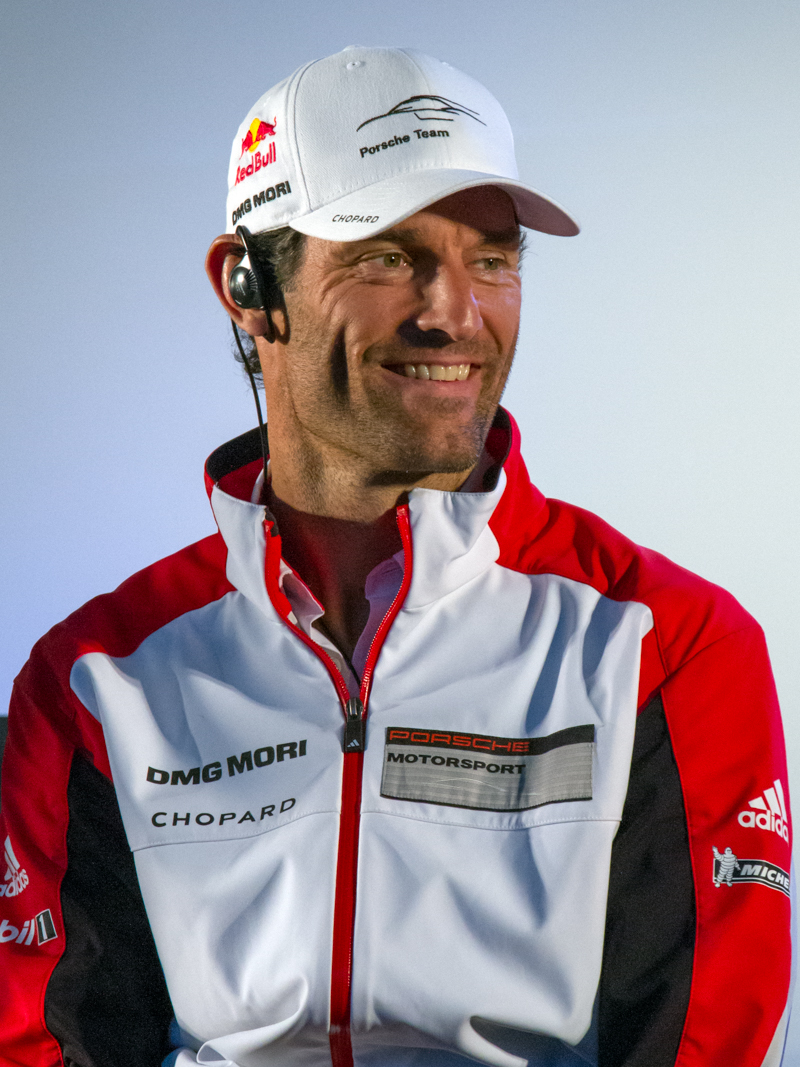
Mark Webber (pictured in 2014) helped secure his, Timo Bernhard and Brendon Hartley's first outright victory in the World Endurance Championship.

Dalla Lana went off the circuit on his 129th lap and was put under pressure from Bertolini who slipstreamed onto the back of a faster LMP2 car on the start/finish straight to pass Dalla Lana at the first corner for the lead in LMGTE Am. Jani drew up to the rear of Tréluyer who was delayed by a Porsche GTE through the final turn and defended heading towards the first turn which allowed di Grassi to get involved in the duel for second-place. Six minutes later, Jani went to the inside of Tréluyer driving into the first corner but ran deep. Tréluyer kept the place by driving alongside Jani going into the next turn. Di Grassi benefited from this and took third place from Jani at the Dunlop hairpin. Jani responded by lining up an overtaking attempt on di Grassi but was unable to reclaim third. Instead, di Grassi passed Tréluyer for second. The final round of pit stops for fuel and driver changes started four minutes later when Webber got aboard the No. 17 Porsche and Lieb took over Jani's sister car. A slow pit stop by di Grassi dropped him to fourth while Lieb lapped quickly and moved in front of Lotterer for second. Lotterer opted not to defend from the faster di Grassi who passed him for third and set about trying to close up to Lieb. The focus upfront was on di Grassi who got the gap from Lieb down to 4.2 seconds and the latter responded by increasing his advantage to five seconds but then hit the No. 36 Singatech Alpine and sustained minor front-right bodywork damage.

Pilet in the No. 92 Porsche was issued a drive-through penalty after the stewards deemed co-driver Makowiecki responsible for causing the collision with Calado. Pilet kept second place after taking his penalty as he built up a large enough gap to remain ahead of Rigon. Unhindered in the final hours of the race Webber took the chequered flag for the No. 17 Porsche to claim his, Bernhard and Hartley's maiden triumph in the World Endurance Championship, a lap ahead of Lieb's No. 18 Porsche. Lotterer in the lead Audi followed in third after di Grassi let him through in the final five minutes. Toyota, unable to match the pace of Audi and Porsche, were three laps behind for a fifth-place finish with the No. 1 car and the No. 2 entry was a further lap adrift in sixth. Tandy maintained his advantage to take KCMG's second consecutive LMP2 win of 2015, followed by the two G-Drive Racing cars of Bird and Derani. The first three positions in LMGTE Pro were unchanged in the final hour and Lietz led home teammate Pilet for a Porsche one-two finish with the podium completed by Rigon's No. 71 Ferrari. In LMGTE Am, Shaytar moved past Dalla Lana in the last half an hour to clinch the No. 72 car's first victory of the season and Agias was third despite spinning in the final ten minutes.

=== Post-race ===
The result of the race meant Lotterer, Fässler and Tréluyer were still in the lead of the Drivers' Championship with 95 points but their advantage had been reduced by three as the maiden victory of Bernhard, Hartley and Webber meant the three drivers were seventeen points behind, having moved up three positions to lie in second. Lieb, Dumas and Jani's strong result allowed the trio to move into third and Tandy fell to fourth as a result of him finishing seventh overall. Bamber and the non-competing Hülkenberg rounded out the top five. Porsche increased their advantage at the top of the Manufacturers' Championship on 184 points; Audi were thirty-three points behind their nearest rivals and Toyota remained in third place with four races left in the season.

=== Race results ===
The minimum number of laps for classification (70 per cent of the overall winning car's race distance) was 142 laps. Class winners are denoted in bold.

Final race classification
Pos	Class	No.	Team	Drivers	Chassis	Tyre	Laps	Time/Retired
Pos	Class	No.	Team	Drivers	Engine	Tyre	Laps	Time/Retired
1	**LMP1**	**17**	**(Germany) Porsche Team**	**(Germany) Timo Bernhard (New Zealand) Brendon Hartley (Australia) Mark Webber**	**Porsche 919 Hybrid**	M	**203**	**06:01.16.966**
1	**LMP1**	**17**	**(Germany) Porsche Team**	**(Germany) Timo Bernhard (New Zealand) Brendon Hartley (Australia) Mark Webber**	**Porsche 2.0 L Turbo V4**	M	**203**	**06:01.16.966**
2	LMP1	18	(Germany) Porsche Team	(Germany) Marc Lieb (France) Romain Dumas (Switzerland) Neel Jani	Porsche 919 Hybrid	M	202	+1 Lap
2	LMP1	18	(Germany) Porsche Team	(Germany) Marc Lieb (France) Romain Dumas (Switzerland) Neel Jani	Porsche 2.0 L Turbo V4	M	202	+1 Lap
3	LMP1	7	(Germany) Audi Sport Team Joest	(Germany) André Lotterer (Switzerland) Marcel Fässler (France) Benoît Tréluyer	Audi R18 e-tron quattro	M	202	+1 Lap
3	LMP1	7	(Germany) Audi Sport Team Joest	(Germany) André Lotterer (Switzerland) Marcel Fässler (France) Benoît Tréluyer	Audi TDI 4.0 L Turbo Diesel V6	M	202	+1 Lap
4	LMP1	8	(Germany) Audi Sport Team Joest	(France) Loïc Duval (Brazil) Lucas di Grassi (United Kingdom) Oliver Jarvis	Audi R18 e-tron quattro	M	202	+1 Lap
4	LMP1	8	(Germany) Audi Sport Team Joest	(France) Loïc Duval (Brazil) Lucas di Grassi (United Kingdom) Oliver Jarvis	Audi TDI 4.0 L Turbo Diesel V6	M	202	+1 Lap
5	LMP1	1	(Japan) Toyota Racing	(United Kingdom) Anthony Davidson (Switzerland) Sébastien Buemi (Japan) Kazuki Nakajima	Toyota TS040 Hybrid	M	200	+3 Laps
5	LMP1	1	(Japan) Toyota Racing	(United Kingdom) Anthony Davidson (Switzerland) Sébastien Buemi (Japan) Kazuki Nakajima	Toyota 3.7 L V8	M	200	+3 Laps
6	LMP1	2	(Japan) Toyota Racing	(Austria) Alexander Wurz (France) Stéphane Sarrazin (United Kingdom) Mike Conway	Toyota TS040 Hybrid	M	199	+4 Laps
6	LMP1	2	(Japan) Toyota Racing	(Austria) Alexander Wurz (France) Stéphane Sarrazin (United Kingdom) Mike Conway	Toyota 3.7 L V8	M	199	+4 Laps
7	**LMP2**	**47**	**(Hong Kong) KCMG**	**(United Kingdom) Matthew Howson (United Kingdom) Richard Bradley (United Kingdom) Nick Tandy**	**Oreca 05**	D	**185**	**+18 Laps**
7	**LMP2**	**47**	**(Hong Kong) KCMG**	**(United Kingdom) Matthew Howson (United Kingdom) Richard Bradley (United Kingdom) Nick Tandy**	**Nissan VK45DE 4.5 L V8**	D	**185**	**+18 Laps**
8	LMP2	26	(Russia) G-Drive Racing	(Russia) Roman Rusinov (France) Julien Canal (United Kingdom) Sam Bird	Ligier JS P2	D	185	+18 Laps
8	LMP2	26	(Russia) G-Drive Racing	(Russia) Roman Rusinov (France) Julien Canal (United Kingdom) Sam Bird	Nissan VK45DE 4.5 L V8	D	185	+18 Laps
9	LMP2	28	(Russia) G-Drive Racing	(Colombia) Gustavo Yacamán (Mexico) Ricardo González (Brazil) Pipo Derani	Ligier JS P2	D	184	+19 Laps
9	LMP2	28	(Russia) G-Drive Racing	(Colombia) Gustavo Yacamán (Mexico) Ricardo González (Brazil) Pipo Derani	Nissan VK45DE 4.5 L V8	D	184	+19 Laps
10	LMP2	43	(Switzerland) Team SARD Morand	(United Kingdom) Oliver Webb (France) Pierre Ragues (United Kingdom) Archie Hamilton	Morgan LMP2 Evo	D	184	+19 Laps
10	LMP2	43	(Switzerland) Team SARD Morand	(United Kingdom) Oliver Webb (France) Pierre Ragues (United Kingdom) Archie Hamilton	SARD (Judd) 3.6 L V8	D	184	+19 Laps
11	LMP2	36	(France) Signatech Alpine	(France) Nelson Panciatici (France) Paul-Loup Chatin (France) Vincent Capillaire	Alpine A450b	D	183	+20 Laps
11	LMP2	36	(France) Signatech Alpine	(France) Nelson Panciatici (France) Paul-Loup Chatin (France) Vincent Capillaire	Nissan VK45DE 4.5 L V8	D	183	+20 Laps
12	LMP2	30	(United States) Extreme Speed Motorsports	(United States) Scott Sharp (United Kingdom) Ryan Dalziel (Denmark) David Heinemeier Hansson	Ligier JS P2	D	183	+20 Laps
12	LMP2	30	(United States) Extreme Speed Motorsports	(United States) Scott Sharp (United Kingdom) Ryan Dalziel (Denmark) David Heinemeier Hansson	Honda HR28TT 2.8 L Turbo V6	D	183	+20 Laps
13	LMP2	42	(United Kingdom) Strakka Racing	(United Kingdom) Nick Leventis (United Kingdom) Jonny Kane (United Kingdom) Danny Watts	Gibson 015S	D	181	+23 Laps
13	LMP2	42	(United Kingdom) Strakka Racing	(United Kingdom) Nick Leventis (United Kingdom) Jonny Kane (United Kingdom) Danny Watts	Nissan VK45DE 4.5 L V8	D	181	+23 Laps
14	LMP2	31	(United States) Extreme Speed Motorsports	(United States) Ed Brown (United States) Johannes van Overbeek (United States) Jon Fogarty	Ligier JS P2	D	177	+26 Laps
14	LMP2	31	(United States) Extreme Speed Motorsports	(United States) Ed Brown (United States) Johannes van Overbeek (United States) Jon Fogarty	Honda HR28TT 2.8 L Turbo V6	D	177	+26 Laps
15	**LMGTE; Pro**	**91**	**(Germany) Porsche Team Manthey**	**(Austria) Richard Lietz (Denmark) Michael Christensen**	**Porsche 911 RSR**	M	**176**	**+27 Laps**
15	**LMGTE; Pro**	**91**	**(Germany) Porsche Team Manthey**	**(Austria) Richard Lietz (Denmark) Michael Christensen**	**Porsche 4.0 L Flat-6**	M	**176**	**+27 Laps**
16	LMGTE; Pro	92	(Germany) Porsche Team Manthey	(France) Patrick Pilet (France) Frédéric Makowiecki	Porsche 911 RSR	M	175	+28 Laps
16	LMGTE; Pro	92	(Germany) Porsche Team Manthey	(France) Patrick Pilet (France) Frédéric Makowiecki	Porsche 4.0 L Flat-6	M	175	+28 Laps
17	LMGTE; Pro	71	(Italy) AF Corse	(Italy) Davide Rigon (United Kingdom) James Calado	Ferrari 458 Italia GT2	M	175	+28 Laps
17	LMGTE; Pro	71	(Italy) AF Corse	(Italy) Davide Rigon (United Kingdom) James Calado	Ferrari 4.5 L V8	M	175	+28 Laps
18	LMP1	4	(Austria) Team ByKolles	(Switzerland) Simon Trummer (Germany) Pierre Kaffer	CLM P1/01	M	175	+28 Laps
18	LMP1	4	(Austria) Team ByKolles	(Switzerland) Simon Trummer (Germany) Pierre Kaffer	AER P60 2.4 L Turbo V6	M	175	+28 Laps
19	LMGTE; Pro	95	(United Kingdom) Aston Martin Racing	(Denmark) Christoffer Nygaard (Denmark) Marco Sørensen	Aston Martin V8 Vantage GTE	M	175	+28 Laps
19	LMGTE; Pro	95	(United Kingdom) Aston Martin Racing	(Denmark) Christoffer Nygaard (Denmark) Marco Sørensen	Aston Martin 4.5 L V8	M	175	+28 Laps
20	LMGTE; Pro	99	(United Kingdom) Aston Martin Racing V8	(Brazil) Fernando Rees (United Kingdom) Alex MacDowall (New Zealand) Richie Stanaway	Aston Martin V8 Vantage GTE	M	174	+29 Laps
20	LMGTE; Pro	99	(United Kingdom) Aston Martin Racing V8	(Brazil) Fernando Rees (United Kingdom) Alex MacDowall (New Zealand) Richie Stanaway	Aston Martin 4.5 L V8	M	174	+29 Laps
21	LMGTE; Pro	97	(United Kingdom) Aston Martin Racing	(United Kingdom) Darren Turner (Germany) Stefan Mücke (United Kingdom) Jonny Adam	Aston Martin V8 Vantage GTE	M	173	+30 Laps
21	LMGTE; Pro	97	(United Kingdom) Aston Martin Racing	(United Kingdom) Darren Turner (Germany) Stefan Mücke (United Kingdom) Jonny Adam	Aston Martin 4.5 L V8	M	173	+30 Laps
22	LMP1	12	(Switzerland) Rebellion Racing	(France) Nico Prost (Germany) Nick Heidfeld (Switzerland) Mathias Beche	Rebellion R-One	M	173	+30 Laps
22	LMP1	12	(Switzerland) Rebellion Racing	(France) Nico Prost (Germany) Nick Heidfeld (Switzerland) Mathias Beche	AER P60 2.4 L Turbo V6	M	173	+30 Laps
23	**LMGTE; Am**	**72**	**(Russia) SMP Racing**	**(Russia) Viktor Shaytar (Russia) Aleksey Basov (Italy) Andrea Bertolini**	**Ferrari 458 Italia GT2**	M	**173**	**+30 Laps**
23	**LMGTE; Am**	**72**	**(Russia) SMP Racing**	**(Russia) Viktor Shaytar (Russia) Aleksey Basov (Italy) Andrea Bertolini**	**Ferrari 4.5 L V8**	M	**173**	**+30 Laps**
24	LMGTE; Am	98	(United Kingdom) Aston Martin Racing	(Canada) Paul Dalla Lana (Portugal) Pedro Lamy (Austria) Mathias Lauda	Aston Martin V8 Vantage GTE	M	172	+31 Laps
24	LMGTE; Am	98	(United Kingdom) Aston Martin Racing	(Canada) Paul Dalla Lana (Portugal) Pedro Lamy (Austria) Mathias Lauda	Aston Martin 4.5 L V8	M	172	+31 Laps
25	LMGTE; Am	83	(Italy) AF Corse	(France) François Perrodo (France) Emmanuel Collard (Portugal) Rui Águas	Ferrari 458 Italia GT2	M	172	+31 Laps
25	LMGTE; Am	83	(Italy) AF Corse	(France) François Perrodo (France) Emmanuel Collard (Portugal) Rui Águas	Ferrari 4.5 L V8	M	172	+31 Laps
26	LMGTE; Am	77	(Germany) Dempsey Racing-Proton	(United States) Patrick Dempsey (United States) Patrick Long (Germany) Marco Seefried	Porsche 911 RSR	M	172	+31 Laps
26	LMGTE; Am	77	(Germany) Dempsey Racing-Proton	(United States) Patrick Dempsey (United States) Patrick Long (Germany) Marco Seefried	Porsche 4.0 L Flat-6	M	172	+31 Laps
27	LMGTE; Am	50	(France) Larbre Compétition	(Italy) Gianluca Roda (Italy) Paolo Ruberti (Denmark) Kristian Poulsen	Chevrolet Corvette C7.R	M	171	+32 Laps
27	LMGTE; Am	50	(France) Larbre Compétition	(Italy) Gianluca Roda (Italy) Paolo Ruberti (Denmark) Kristian Poulsen	Chevrolet 5.5 L V8	M	171	+32 Laps
28	LMGTE; Am	88	(Germany) Abu Dhabi-Proton Racing	(Germany) Christian Ried (New Zealand) Earl Bamber (United Arab Emirates) Khaled Al Qubaisi	Porsche 911 RSR	M	170	+33 Laps
28	LMGTE; Am	88	(Germany) Abu Dhabi-Proton Racing	(Germany) Christian Ried (New Zealand) Earl Bamber (United Arab Emirates) Khaled Al Qubaisi	Porsche 4.0 L Flat-6	M	170	+33 Laps
29	LMGTE; Am	96	(United Kingdom) Aston Martin Racing	(Germany) Roald Goethe (United Kingdom) Stuart Hall (Italy) Francesco Castellacci	Aston Martin V8 Vantage GTE	M	169	+34 Laps
29	LMGTE; Am	96	(United Kingdom) Aston Martin Racing	(Germany) Roald Goethe (United Kingdom) Stuart Hall (Italy) Francesco Castellacci	Aston Martin 4.5 L V8	M	169	+34 Laps
30	LMGTE; Pro	51	(Italy) AF Corse	(Italy) Gianmaria Bruni (Finland) Toni Vilander	Ferrari 458 Italia GT2	M	168	+35 Laps
30	LMGTE; Pro	51	(Italy) AF Corse	(Italy) Gianmaria Bruni (Finland) Toni Vilander	Ferrari 4.5 L V8	M	168	+35 Laps
DNF	LMP1	13	(Switzerland) Rebellion Racing	(Switzerland) Alexandre Imperatori (Austria) Dominik Kraihamer (Germany) Daniel Abt	Rebellion R-One	M	1	Engine
DNF	LMP1	13	(Switzerland) Rebellion Racing	(Switzerland) Alexandre Imperatori (Austria) Dominik Kraihamer (Germany) Daniel Abt	AER P60 2.4 L Turbo V6	M	1	Engine

Tyre manufacturers
Key
Symbol	Tyre manufacturer
**D**	Dunlop
**M**	Michelin

== Standings after the race ==
World Endurance Drivers' Championship standings
Pos.	+/–	Driver	Points
1		(Germany) André Lotterer (Switzerland) Marcel Fässler (France) Benoît Tréluyer	95
2	3	(Germany) Timo Bernhard (Australia) Mark Webber (New Zealand) Brendon Hartley	78
3	1	(Germany) Marc Lieb (France) Romain Dumas (Switzerland) Neel Jani	76
4	2	(United Kingdom) Nick Tandy	66
5	2	(Germany) Nico Hülkenberg (New Zealand) Earl Bamber	53

World Endurance Manufacturers' Championship standings
Pos.	+/–	Constructor	Points
1		(Germany) Porsche	184
2		(Germany) Audi	151
3		(Japan) Toyota	89
4		(Japan) Nissan	0

- Note: Only the top five positions are included for the Drivers' Championship standings.

FIA World Endurance Championship
Previous race: 24 Hours of Le Mans	2015 season	Next race: 6 Hours of Circuit of the Americas
