= Nissan GT-R LM Nismo =

Sports prototype racing car

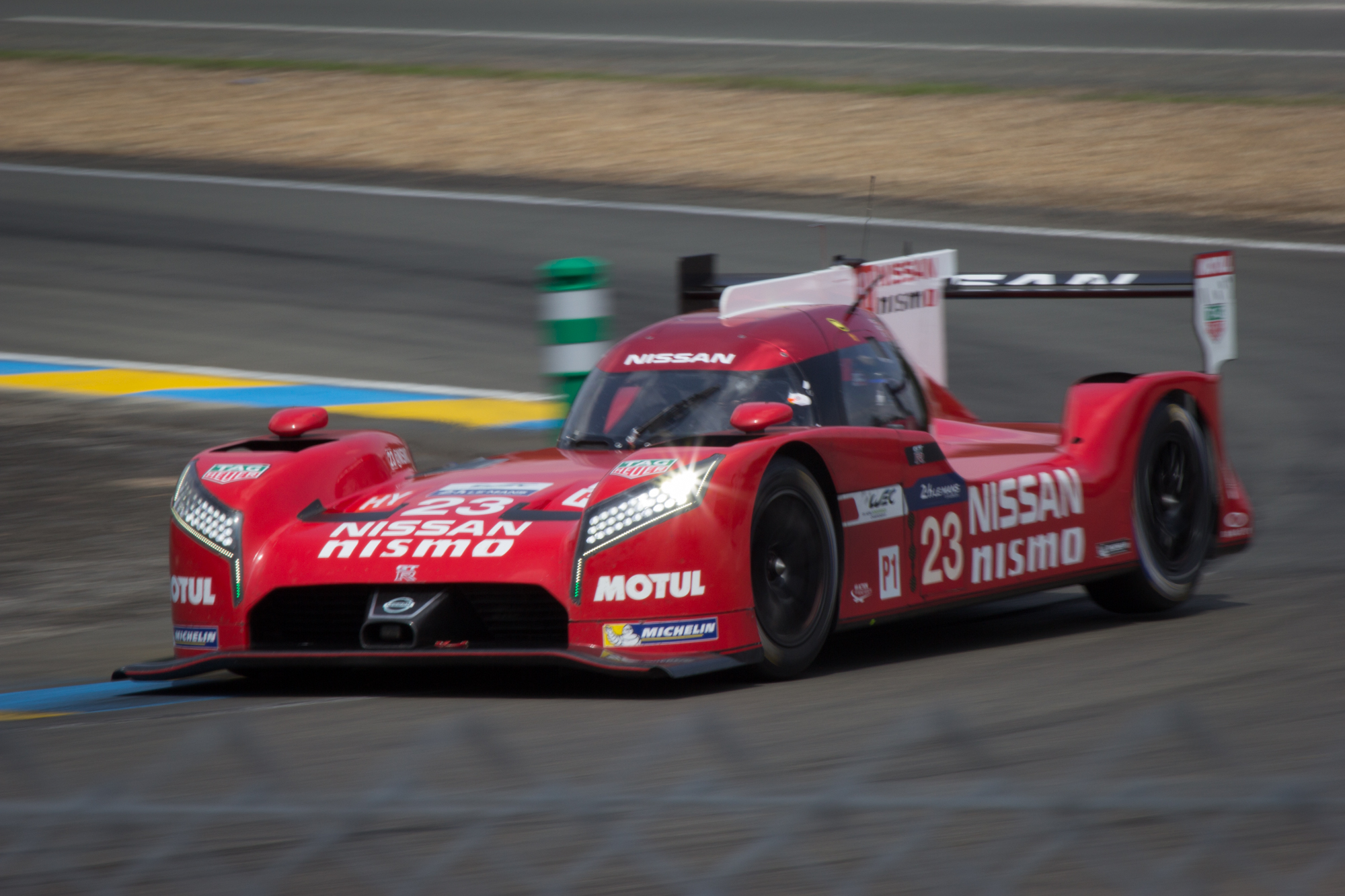
- The No. 23 GT-R LM Nismo at the 2015 24 Hours of Le Mans
- Category: LMP1
- Constructor: Nissan
- Designer: Ben Bowlby
- Predecessor: Nissan R391

Technical specifications
- Chassis: Carbon fibre
- Suspension (front): Independent multi-link pushrods
- Suspension (rear): Independent multi-link pushrods with hydraulic anti-roll bar
- Length: 4,645 mm (182.9 in)
- Width: 1,900 mm (75 in)
- Height: 1,030 mm (41 in)
- Engine: Nissan VRX30A 3.0 litres (183 cubic inches) direct-injected twin-turbocharged 60° V6 engine in a longitudinal front mid-engine configuration with front-wheel-drive system
- Transmission: Xtrac five-speed hydraulically-activated sequential gearbox and epicyclic reduction gearbox with limited-slip differential
- Weight: Appr. 880 kg (1,940 lb)
- Fuel: Shell V-Power LM24
- Lubricants: Motul
- Tires: Michelin Pilot SPORT GT 31/71-18 front, 20/71-16 rear radials

Competition history
- Notable entrants: (Japan) Nissan Motorsports
- Notable drivers: (United Kingdom) Harry Tincknell (France) Olivier Pla (Japan) Tsugio Matsuda (Germany) Michael Krumm (United Kingdom) Jann Mardenborough (United Kingdom) Alex Buncombe (United Kingdom) Max Chilton (Spain) Lucas Ordóñez (Russia) Mark Shulzhitskiy
- Debut: 2015 24 Hours of Le Mans
- Last event: 2015 24 Hours of Le Mans
Races	Wins	Poles	F/Laps
1	0	0	0

The Nissan GT-R LM Nismo is a sports prototype racing car built by the Nissan Motor Company and their motorsports division Nismo. Designed for the Le Mans Prototype 1 (LMP1) regulations of the FIA World Endurance Championship and the 24 Hours of Le Mans, the GT-R LM was unique amongst Le Mans Prototypes at the time for utilizing a front-wheel drive, front mid-engine layout for its internal combustion engine, as opposed to the rear mid-engine layout used by nearly all other competitors in the category. In addition to the engine's drive to the front wheels, a powerful flywheel-based kinetic energy recovery system regenerated energy from front wheel braking, which could be fed to a complex auxiliary rear-wheel drive system.

The GT-R LM Nismo was Nissan's first prototype chassis since the R391 in 1999, although the company had developed engines in recent years. The car was branded after the Nissan GT-R road car and shares similar engine and drivetrain configurations, but is not related to the sports car. The GT-R LM Nismo program was announced on 23 May 2014, while the car was publicly shown for the first time in a Nissan commercial during Super Bowl XLIX on 1 February 2015. It was retired from competition at the end of 2015, after having only competed unsuccessfully at the 2015 24 Hours of Le Mans.

== Design and development ==
Chief designer Ben Bowlby was given the brief from Nissan to not design an "Audi copy". Bowlby placed the GT-R LM's combustion engine in front of the cockpit, a layout that had only been used before in the Panoz LMP-1. Unlike the Panoz's rear-wheel drive powertrain, the GT-R LM powered the front axle through a gearbox located in front of the engine. This was done in the belief Nissan could construct a front-engine car that was faster and had improved stability and efficiency. When designing the car, Bowlby noted the rear-end designs of Le Mans Prototype were limited in size, resulting in poor aerodynamic efficiency and saw the front-end of such vehicles had been largely untouched, "So we thought: why not turn the rules on their head and make a car with lots of downforce at the front? Not only does this give us greater freedom within the rules, but front downforce is generated more efficiently, with less drag. Moreover, with the front end doing most of the work, we could trim out the rear wing and save even more drag, which is invaluable at Le Mans." The chassis was made from carbon fibre which helped engineers lower the weight of the car to the minimum limit of 870 kilograms (1,920 lb) as set by motorsport's governing body, the Fédération Internationale de l'Automobile (FIA).

The engine, co-developed by Nissan and Cosworth, was a 3.0 L (180 cu in) 60-degree V6 with dual turbochargers and direct injection, and was seen by Nissan as the most fuel efficient design. Behind the engine and beneath the cockpit was a kinetic energy recovery system using two flywheels developed by Torotrak. The flywheels gained energy from the use of the front brakes then discharges that energy back to the front wheels via a driveshaft running over the top of the combustion engine. The flywheels could also output power to a secondary driveshaft which was connected to a limited-slip differential at the rear of the car which fed epicyclic gearboxes located in each rear wheel hub, allowing the GT-R to be all-wheel drive if necessary. The combustion engine output approximately 500 hp (370 kW; 510 PS), while the flywheel system had an additional output of approximately 750 hp (560 kW; 760 PS). The company sought engineers from its performance division Nismo for their knowledge on the engine's development, but had problems installing the power plant into the monocoque. Engineers interpreted the regulations set by the FIA and the organiser the Automobile Club de l'Ouest (ACO) differently, causing a minor chassis redesign, and could only be inserted through the front windshield. The developers prioritised efficiency over sheer thrust since the ACO established rules that limited fuel capacity for Le Mans Prototype 1 (LMP1) hybrids to 68 litres (18 US gal).

With the weight bias of the GT-R LM heavier in the front and power primarily directed at the front axle, the wheels were offset to balance the car. The front tyres were 14 in (360 mm) wide, while the rear tyres were only 9 in (230 mm) wide. Michelin served as the team's tyre supplier and worked closely with Nissan to determine the correct compound and size for the car's front and back wheels. Cooling for the engine, gearbox and flywheel systems was located in the nose of the car, allowing the bodywork around the cockpit to be utilised as airflow tunnels. The use of the tunnels required the turbochargers to be placed on top of the engine, exhausting out of the top of the bodywork in front of the windshield. The rear drivetrain was designed without traditional halfshafts that would be required to traverse the tunnels, opting instead for the epicyclic gearing system to work around the tunnels. The suspension geometry was carefully refined and consisted of adjustable Penske rear dampers and Öhlins front dampers along with a rear hydraulic anti-roll bar system. The Xtrac five-speed hydraulically-activated sequential gearbox was cast by a Michigan-based company. Cosworth supplied the car's engine control unit for the gearbox which provided power to the wheels via the hydraulic limited-slip differential.

=== Program and testing ===
Nissan publicly announced its GT-R LM program in East London on 23 May 2014. Six months later, drivers began testing the car for the first time in a two-day roll-out session at the Nissan Technology Centre in Stanfield, Arizona. Testing continued into January 2015 at the Circuit of the Americas. Initially planned for a launch in Europe, Nissan North America chose instead to integrate the new car into their Super Bowl commercial and the film was made during the GT-R LM's testing at Circuit of the Americas. Testing resumed in February at Palm Beach International Raceway which saw the GT-R LM undertake its first running in night conditions, before travelling to Michelin Laurens Proving Grounds in South Carolina that same month for straight line speed testing. A weeks' worth of running at Sebring International Raceway in March ended prematurely after two days because of an engine mounting problem.

Nissan intended to enter two GT-R LM's in the 2015 FIA World Endurance Championship (WEC) starting in April 2015, while a third car would be entered for the 24 Hours of Le Mans. By the time of its planned debut at Silverstone, drivers had covered 3,800 kilometres (2,400 mi) with the GT-R LM in testing but its first racing appearance was delayed until Le Mans because the car twice failed its crash test and was forced to miss the WEC pre-season test session at the Circuit Paul Ricard. The first crash test ended in failure because the car's front roll hoop was damaged. Engineers were also mandated to redesign the car's door because the FIA decided they should have include an anti-burst load but failed its test first time around and the door's structure was entirely altered following its skin cracking. Testing resumed in April with four days' worth of endurance running with 2,000 kilometres (1,200 mi) amassed at the NCM Motorsports Park race track in Bowling Green, Kentucky.

The company named nine drivers to the team in early 2015. Former Le Mans winner Marc Gené was the first driver announced for the program, moving to the team from rivals Audi. Gené later announced in May 2015 that he would not race for the team but would remain in an advisory capacity. His seat was filled by Mark Shulzhitskiy. Harry Tincknell, who won the LMP2 category at Le Mans in 2014, joined former European Le Mans Series champion Olivier Pla and defending Super GT champion Tsugio Matsuda as the next set of drivers. Jann Mardenborough and Lucas Ordóñez, former winners of Nissan's GT Academy were also announced alongside former FIA GT1 World Champion Michael Krumm. Former Marussia Formula One driver Max Chilton and multiple sports car racer Alex Buncombe were the final two drivers confirmed for Nissan's program.

The car underwent further testing after Le Mans at NOLA Motorsports Park in December 2015 before the program was officially cancelled on 22 December. A second-generation GT-R LM Nismo had been designed for 2016, adapted to run an electrical hybrid system, but was never completed before the project ended.

The GT-R LM made its virtual debut in Gran Turismo 6 as downloadable content for the 2015 GT Academy competition.

== Racing history ==
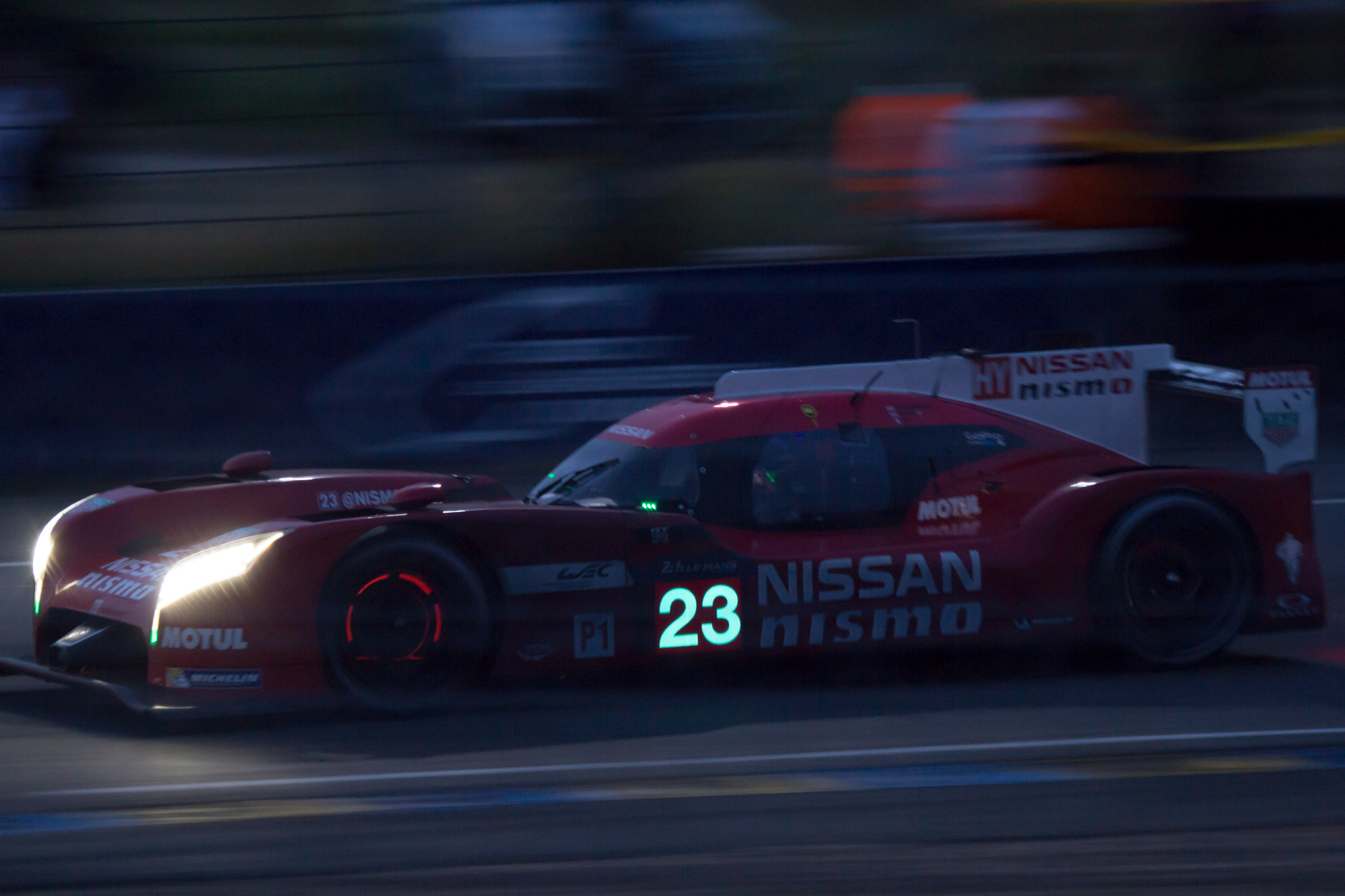
The No. 23 GT-R LM Nismo under nighttime conditions during the 2015 24 Hours of Le Mans

The car made its racing debut at the 2015 24 Hours of Le Mans. Three cars were entered for the race by Nissan Motorsports, numbered 21, 22 and 23. The cars qualified in the last three places of the LMP1 class with times over 20 seconds slower than the pole position time set by the No. 18 Porsche 919 Hybrid. The No. 21 car was even out-qualified by the fastest LMP2 car. After the three cars failed to achieve a time within 110 percent of the pole position time, they were demoted to the back of the prototype grid. The No. 21 car retired from the race after 115 laps with a suspension failure, while the No. 23 car retired on lap 234 with gearbox issues. The No. 22 car finished the race, but was not classified as it failed to complete 70 percent of the race winning car's race distance. After an unsuccessful debut at Le Mans, Nissan chose to move on from the GT-R LM Nismo campaign.

== Complete World Endurance Championship results ==
(Races in bold indicate pole position; races in italics indicate fastest lap)

Year	Entrant	Class	Drivers	No.	Rounds								Pts.	Pos.
Year	Entrant	Class	Drivers	No.	SIL (United Kingdom)	SPA (Belgium)	LMS (France)	NÜR (Germany)	COA (United States)	FUJ (Japan)	SHA (China)	BHR (Bahrain)	Pts.	Pos.
2015	Nissan Motorsports	LMP1	(Japan) Tsugio Matsuda (Spain) Lucas Ordóñez (Russia) Mark Shulzhitskiy	21			Ret						0	NC
2015	Nissan Motorsports	LMP1	(United Kingdom) Harry Tincknell (United Kingdom) Alex Buncombe (Germany) Michael Krumm	22			NC						0	NC
2015	Nissan Motorsports	LMP1	(United Kingdom) Max Chilton (United Kingdom) Jann Mardenborough (France) Olivier Pla	23			Ret						0	NC

== See also ==
- Nissan ZEOD RC
- Nissan R391
