= 2015 24 Hours of Spa =

2015 Total Spa 24 Hours

Seasons
- ← 2014 2016 →

Layout of the Circuit de Spa-Francorchamps

The 2015 Total Spa 24 Hours was the 68th running of the Spa 24 Hours. It was also the fourth round of the 2015 Blancpain Endurance Series season and was held on 25 and 26 July at the Circuit de Spa-Francorchamps, Belgium.

The race was won by BMW Sports Trophy Team Marc VDS and drivers Nick Catsburg, Lucas Luhr and Markus Palttala. The trio's No. 46 BMW Z4 GT3 finished a lap clear of Audi Sport Team WRT and their No. 2 Audi R8 LMS, driven by Nico Müller, Stéphane Ortelli and Frank Stippler. Completing the podium in third place was the No. 5 Audi Sport Phoenix Racing Audi R8 LMS ultra of Christian Mamerow, Christopher Mies and Nicki Thiim, two laps down on the winners.

In the race's other classes, the No. 47 AF Corse Ferrari 458 Italia GT3 of Gianmaria Bruni, Pasin Lathouras, Stéphane Lémeret and Alessandro Pier Guidi were the winners of the Pro-Am Cup in fourth place overall, while the Cup for amateur drivers was won by the No. 24 Audi R8 LMS ultra of Team Parker Racing, driven by Ian Loggie, Callum MacLeod, Benny Simonsen and Julian Westwood.

== Race result ==
Pos	Class	No	Team	Drivers	Car	Laps	Qual
1	Pro Cup	46	(Belgium) BMW Sports Trophy Team Marc VDS	(Finland) Markus Palttala (Germany) Lucas Luhr (Netherlands) Nick Catsburg	BMW Z4 GT3	536	
2	Pro Cup	2	(Belgium) Audi Sport Team WRT	(Germany) Frank Stippler (Switzerland) Nico Müller (Monaco) Stéphane Ortelli	Audi R8 LMS Ultra	535	
3	Pro Cup	5	(Germany) Audi Sport Phoenix Racing	(Germany) Christian Mamerow (Germany) Christopher Mies (Denmark) Nicki Thiim	Audi R8 LMS Ultra	534	
4	Pro-Am Cup	47	(Italy) AF Corse	(Italy) Alessandro Pier Guidi (Thailand) Pasin Lathouras (Belgium) Stéphane Lémeret (Italy) Gianmaria Bruni	Ferrari 458 Italia GT3	531	
5	Pro Cup	6	(Germany) Audi Sport Phoenix Racing	(Switzerland) Marcel Fässler (Germany) André Lotterer (Germany) Mike Rockenfeller	Audi R8 LMS Ultra	530	
6	Pro-Am Cup	51	(Italy) AF Corse	(Italy) Davide Rigon (United Kingdom) Duncan Cameron (Republic of Ireland) Matt Griffin (Portugal) Francisco Guedes	Ferrari 458 Italia GT3	529	
7	Pro-Am Cup	79	(United Kingdom) Ecurie Ecosse	(United Kingdom) Devon Modell (United Kingdom) Alasdair McCaig (United Kingdom) Oliver Bryant (United Kingdom) Alexander Sims	BMW Z4 GT3	527	
8	Pro-Am Cup	78	Team Russia by Barwell	(Russia) Leo Machitski (United Kingdom) Jon Minshaw (United Kingdom) Jonny Cocker (United Kingdom) Phil Keen	BMW Z4 GT3	527	
9	Pro Cup	84	(Germany) Bentley Team HTP	(Switzerland) Harold Primat (France) Vincent Abril (France) Mike Parisy	Bentley Continental GT3	527	
10	Pro-Am Cup	32	(United Kingdom) Leonard Motorsport AMR	(United Kingdom) Tom Onslow-Cole (Germany) Stefan Mücke (United Kingdom) Stuart Leonard (United Kingdom) Michael Meadows	Aston Martin Vantage GT3	523	
11	Pro-Am Cup	52	(Italy) AF Corse	(Finland) Toni Vilander (Belgium) Adrien de Leener (Monaco) Cédric Sbirrazzuoli (Italy) Raffaele Giammaria	Ferrari 458 Italia GT3	521	
12	Pro Cup	21	(Germany) Black Falcon	(Saudi Arabia) Abdulaziz Al Faisal (Germany) Hubert Haupt (Netherlands) Yelmer Buurman	Mercedes-Benz SLS AMG GT3	520	
13	Pro Cup	77	(Brazil) BMW Sports Trophy Team Brasil	(Brazil) Cacá Bueno (Brazil) Sérgio Jimenez (Brazil) Felipe Fraga	BMW Z4 GT3	516	
14	Am Cup	24	(United Kingdom) Team Parker Racing	(United Kingdom) Ian Loggie (United Kingdom) Julian Westwood (United Kingdom) Callum MacLeod (Denmark) Benny Simonsen	Audi R8 LMS Ultra	513	
15	Pro Cup	23	(Japan) Nissan GT Academy Team RJN	(United Kingdom) Alex Buncombe (Japan) Katsumasa Chiyo (Belgium) Wolfgang Reip	Nissan GT-R Nismo GT3	513	
16	Pro Cup	99	(Germany) Rowe Racing	(Spain) Daniel Juncadella (Germany) Nico Bastian (Netherlands) Stef Dusseldorp	Mercedes-Benz SLS AMG GT3	511	
17	Am Cup	56	(Germany) Attempto Racing	(Germany) Jürgen Häring (Germany) Frank Schmickler (Germany) Philipp Wlazik (Greece) Dimitrios Konstantinou	Porsche 997 GT3 R	511	
18	Pro Cup	59	(New Zealand) Von Ryan Racing	(Brazil) Bruno Senna (United Kingdom) Adrian Quaife-Hobbs (Portugal) Álvaro Parente	McLaren 650 S GT3	511	
19	Am Cup	111	(Switzerland) Kessel Racing	(Australia) Liam Talbot (United States) Stephen Earle (Italy) Marco Zanuttini (France) Marc Rostan	Ferrari 458 Italia GT3	510	
20	Am Cup	10	(France) AKKA ASP	(France) Christophe Bourret (France) Pascal Gibon (France) Philippe Polette (France) Jean-Philippe Belloc	Ferrari 458 Italia GT3	510	
21	Pro Cup	1	(Belgium) Belgian Audi Club Team WRT	(Germany) René Rast (Belgium) Laurens Vanthoor (Germany) Markus Winkelhock	Audi R8 LMS Ultra	508	
22	Am Cup	28	(France) Delahaye Racing Team	(France) Pierre-Etienne Bordet (France) Alexandre Viron (France) Emmanuel Orgeval (France) Paul-Loup Chatin	Porsche 997 GT3 R	504	
23	Am Cup	42	(France) Sport Garage	(Belgium) Christoff Corten (France) Marc Guillot (France) Tony Samon (France) Christian Beroujon	Ferrari 458 Italia GT3	504	
24	Pro-Am Cup	333	(Italy) Rinaldi Racing	(Germany) Marco Seefried (Russia) Rinat Salikhov (Belgium) Stef Vancampenhoudt (Austria) Norbert Siedler	Ferrari 458 Italia GT3	503	
25	Pro Cup	9	(Italy) ROAL Motorsport	(Germany) Timo Glock (Italy) Alex Zanardi (Canada) Bruno Spengler	BMW Z4 GT3	500	
26	Pro-Am Cup	22	(Japan) Nissan GT Academy Team RJN	(France) Olivier Pla (Mexico) Ricardo Sanchez (France) Gaëtan Paletou (Germany) Florian Strauss	Nissan GT-R Nismo GT3	499	
27	Pro-Am Cup	14	(Switzerland) Emil Frey Racing	(Switzerland) Fredy Barth (Switzerland) Lorenz Frey (Switzerland) Gabriele Gardel (Switzerland) Jonathan Hirschi	Jaguar XK Emil Frey G3	497	
28	Pro-Am Cup	41	(France) Sport Garage	(Italy) Gabriele Lancieri (France) Gilles Vannelet (France) Enzo Guibbert (France) Éric Cayrolle	Ferrari 458 Italia GT3	480	
29	Pro Cup	58	(New Zealand) Von Ryan Racing	(New Zealand) Shane van Gisbergen (United Kingdom) Rob Bell (France) Kévin Estre	McLaren 650 S GT3	457	
30	Pro-Am Cup	44	Oman Racing Team	(Oman) Ahmad Al Harthy (United Kingdom) Daniel Lloyd (United Kingdom) Jonathan Adam (Australia) Jonathan Venter	Aston Martin Vantage GT3	444	
31	Pro Cup	45	(Belgium) BMW Sports Trophy Team Marc VDS	(Brazil) Augusto Farfus, Jr. (Belgium) Maxime Martin (Germany) Dirk Werner	BMW Z4 GT3	399	
32	Am Cup	50	(Italy) AF Corse	(Italy) Riccardo Ragazzi (Russia) Alexander Moiseev (Russia) Garry Kondakov (Portugal) Rui Águas	Ferrari 458 Italia GT3	397	
Ret	Pro Cup	63	(Austria) GRT Grasser Racing Team	(Italy) Giovanni Venturini (South Africa) Adrian Zaugg (Italy) Mirko Bortolotti	Lamborghini Huracán GT3	364	
Ret	Am Cup	36	(France) Saintéloc Racing	(France) Michael Blanchemain (Italy) Beniamino Caccia (France) Philippe Haezebrouck (France) Gilles Lallement	Audi R8 LMS Ultra	361	
Ret	Pro-Am Cup	12	(France) TDS Racing	(Switzerland) Mathias Beche (France) Eric Dermont (France) Henry Hassid (France) Franck Perera	BMW Z4 GT3	353	
Ret	Pro-Am Cup	71	(Russia) GT Russian Team	(Estonia) Marko Asmer (Russia) Aleksey Vasilyev (United Kingdom) Lewis Plato (Netherlands) Indy Dontje	Mercedes-Benz SLS AMG GT3	319	
Ret	Am Cup	30	(France) Classic and Modern Racing	(Belgium) Christian Kelders (Switzerland) Pierre Hirschi (France) Jean-Luc Blanchemain (Belgium) Frederic Bouvy	BMW Z4 GT3	319	
Ret	Pro-Am Cup	100	(United States) DragonSpeed	(United Kingdom) Ryan Dalziel (Sweden) Henrik Hedman (United States) Elton Julian (United States) Anthony Lazzaro	Ferrari 458 Italia GT3	277	
Ret	Pro Cup	8	(United Kingdom) Bentley Team M-Sport	(Germany) Maximilian Buhk (Spain) Andy Soucek (Belgium) Maxime Soulet	Bentley Continental GT3	258	
Ret	Pro-Am Cup	18	(Germany) Black Falcon	(Germany) Maro Engel (Germany) Bernd Schneider (United Kingdom) Oliver Morley (United States) Sean Johnston	Mercedes-Benz SLS AMG GT3	226	
Ret	Pro-Am Cup	17	Insight Racing Denmark	(Denmark) Dennis Andersen (Denmark) Anders Fjordbach (Denmark) Martin Jensen	Ferrari 458 Italia GT3	198	
Ret	Pro Cup	35	(France) Saintéloc Racing	(France) Grégory Guilvert (Germany) Marc Basseng (Sweden) Edward Sandström	Audi R8 LMS Ultra	179	
Ret	Pro Cup	3	(Belgium) Belgian Audi Club Team WRT	(Netherlands) Robin Frijns (Monaco) Stéphane Richelmi (France) Jean-Karl Vernay	Audi R8 LMS Ultra	178	
Ret	Pro-Am Cup	4	(Belgium) Team WRT	(United Kingdom) James Nash (Netherlands) Max Koebolt (Netherlands) Pieter Schothorst (France) Sacha Bottemanne	Audi R8 LMS Ultra	157	
Ret	Pro-Am Cup	83	(Germany) Bentley Team HTP	(Germany) Fabian Hamprecht (Belgium) Louis Machiels (Austria) Clemens Schmid (Netherlands) Max van Splunteren	Bentley Continental GT3	150	
Ret	Pro Cup	19	(Austria) GRT Grasser Racing Team	(Italy) Fabio Babini (Netherlands) Jeroen Mul (United States) Andrew Palmer	Lamborghini Huracán GT3	129	
Ret	Pro Cup	7	(United Kingdom) Bentley Team M-Sport	(United Kingdom) Steven Kane (United Kingdom) Andy Meyrick (United Kingdom) Guy Smith	Bentley Continental GT3	118	
Ret	Pro Cup	29	(Germany) Black Falcon	(United Kingdom) Adam Christodoulou (Sweden) Andreas Simonsen (Belgium) Nico Verdonck	Mercedes-Benz SLS AMG GT3	106	
Ret	Pro-Am Cup	11	(Switzerland) Kessel Racing	(Italy) Andrea Piccini (Italy) Alessandro Bonacini (Poland) Michał Broniszewski (United Kingdom) Michael Lyons	Ferrari 458 Italia GT3	106	
Ret	Pro-Am Cup	888	(United Kingdom) Triple Eight Racing	(Germany) Dirk Müller (United Kingdom) Lee Mowle (United Kingdom) Joe Osborne (United Kingdom) Ryan Ratcliffe	BMW Z4 GT3	94	
Ret	Pro Cup	75	(Czech Republic) ISR	(Italy) Marco Bonanomi (Czech Republic) Filip Salaquarda (Belgium) Frédéric Vervisch	Audi R8 LMS Ultra	76	
Ret	Pro-Am Cup	70	(Russia) GT Russian Team	(France) Christophe Bouchut (Germany) Kenneth Heyer (Russia) Alexey Karachev (Spain) Miguel Toril	Mercedes-Benz SLS AMG GT3	60	
Ret	Pro-Am Cup	240	(Belgium) BMW Racing Against Cancer	(Belgium) Marc Duez (Belgium) Jean-Michel Martin (Belgium) Eric van de Poele (Belgium) Pascal Witmeur	BMW Z4 GT3	42	
Ret	Pro Cup	73	(Germany) MRS GT-Racing	(United Kingdom) Craig Dolby (United Kingdom) Martin Plowman (United Kingdom) Sean Walkinshaw	Nissan GT-R Nismo GT3	37	
Ret	Pro-Am Cup	53	(Italy) AF Corse	(Italy) Marco Cioci (Italy) Piergiuseppe Perazzini (Venezuela) Enzo Potolicchio (Italy) Michele Rugolo	Ferrari 458 Italia GT3	36	
Ret	Am Cup	15	(Belgium) Boutsen Ginion	(Luxembourg) Olivier Grotz (Saudi Arabia) Karim Ojjeh (South Africa) Jordan Grogor (Germany) Werner Hamprecht	BMW Z4 GT3	14	
Ret	Am Cup	90	(France) Duqueine Engineering	(France) Romain Brandela (France) Eric Clément (Belgium) Bernard Delhez (France) Gilles Duqueine	Ferrari 458 Italia GT3	7	
