= 2016 Bathurst 12 Hour =

Endurance motor racing event

2016 Liqui Moly Bathurst 12 Hour

Seasons
- ← 2015 2017 →

Layout of the Mount Panorama Circuit

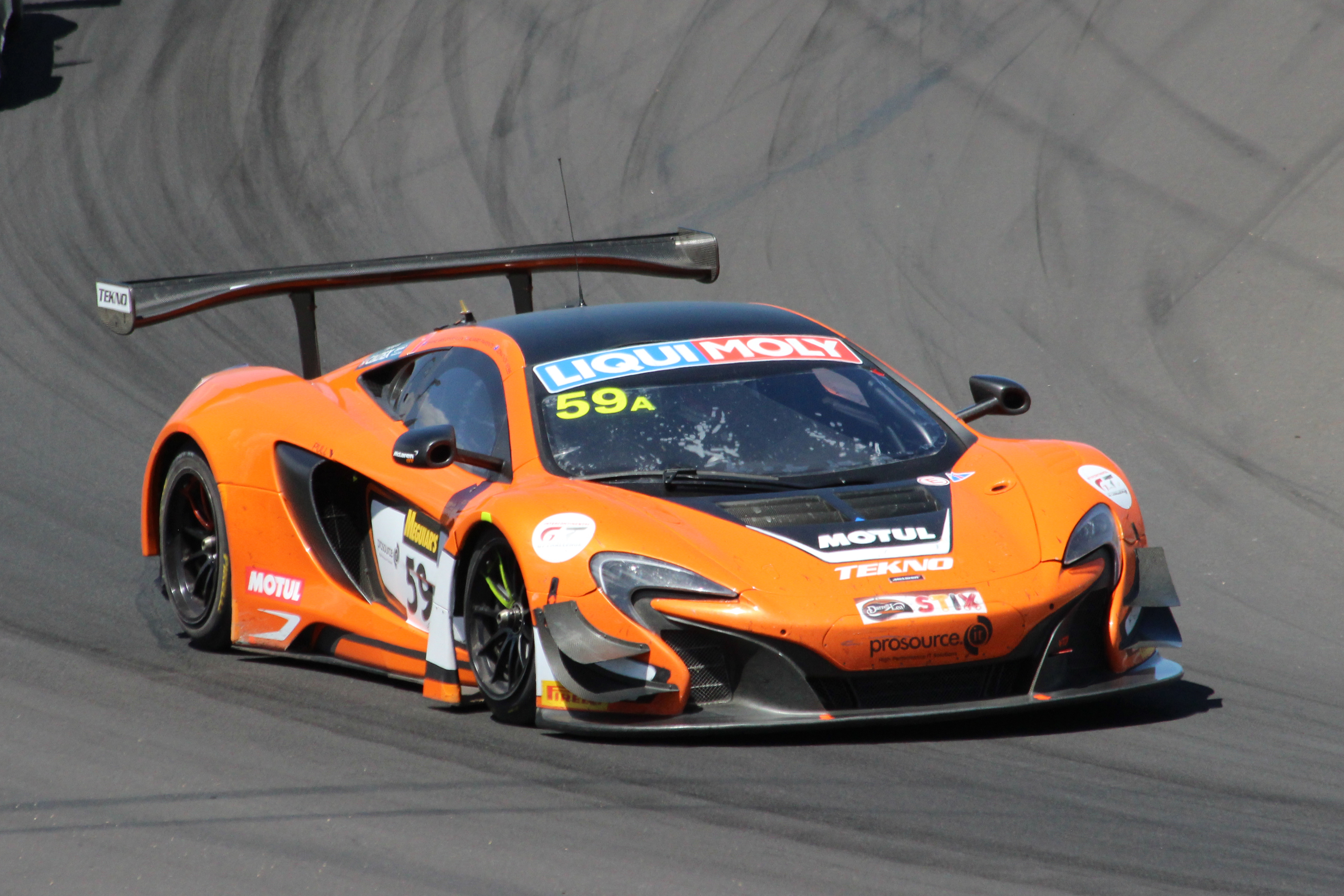
The race and Class AP-winning McLaren 650S GT3 of Álvaro Parente, Shane van Gisbergen and Jonathon Webb.

The 2016 Liqui Moly Bathurst 12 Hour was an endurance race for a variety of GT and touring car classes, including: GT3 cars, GT4 cars and Group 3E Series Production Cars. The event, which was staged at the Mount Panorama Circuit, near Bathurst, in New South Wales, Australia on 7 February 2016, was the fourteenth running of the Bathurst 12 Hour. It was also the opening round of the 2016 Intercontinental GT Challenge Series.

37 cars were entered for the race and 36 cars started the race, with one entry withdrawn following a crash in practice. Álvaro Parente, Shane van Gisbergen and Jonathon Webb won the event driving a McLaren 650S GT3. Despite 13 safety car periods, the race ended with 297 laps completed, a race record distance.

== Class structure ==
Cars competed in the following three classes.

- Class A – GT3 Outright
  - Class AP – GT3 Pro-Am, for driver combinations including one unseeded driver.
  - Class AA – GT3 Am, for driver combinations including two or three unseeded drivers.
- Class B – GT3 Cup Cars
- Class I – Invitational

Class C was also available for entry for GT4 cars, however due to lack of entries, the sole Class C car entered was merged into Class I.

== Official results ==
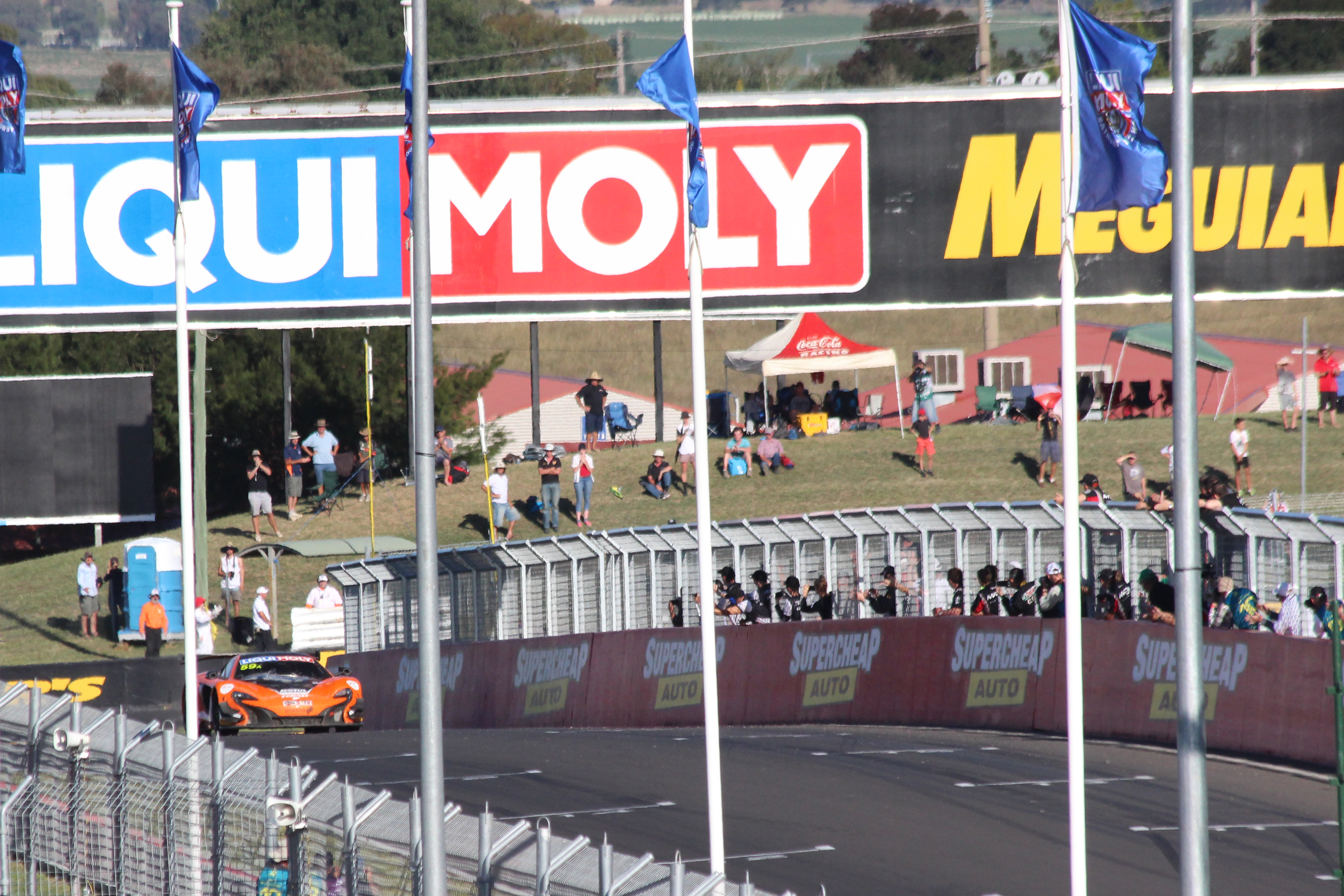
Shane van Gisbergen crosses the finish line to take victory.

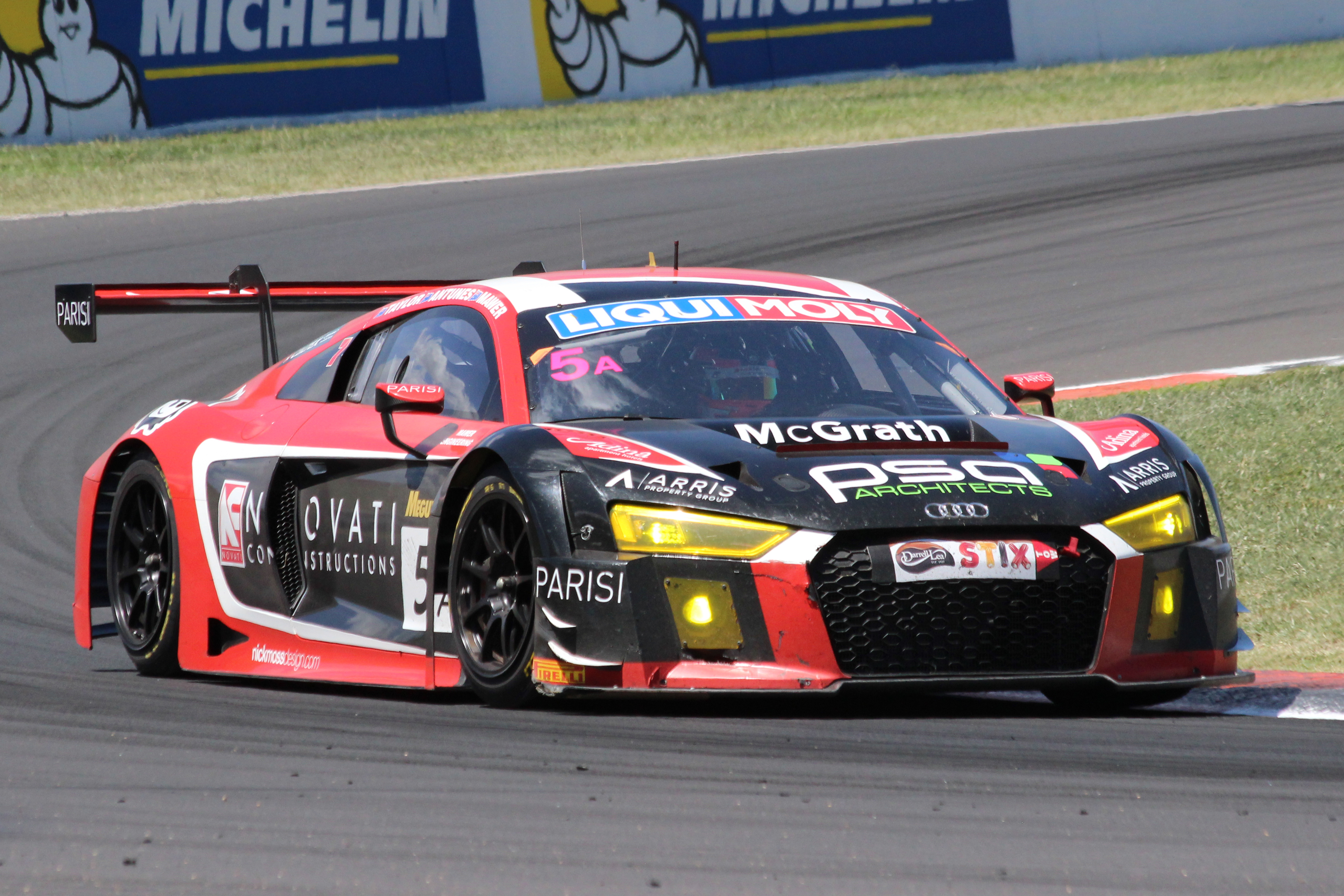
The Class AA-winning Audi R8 LMS of Nathan Antunes, Barton Mawer and Greg Taylor.

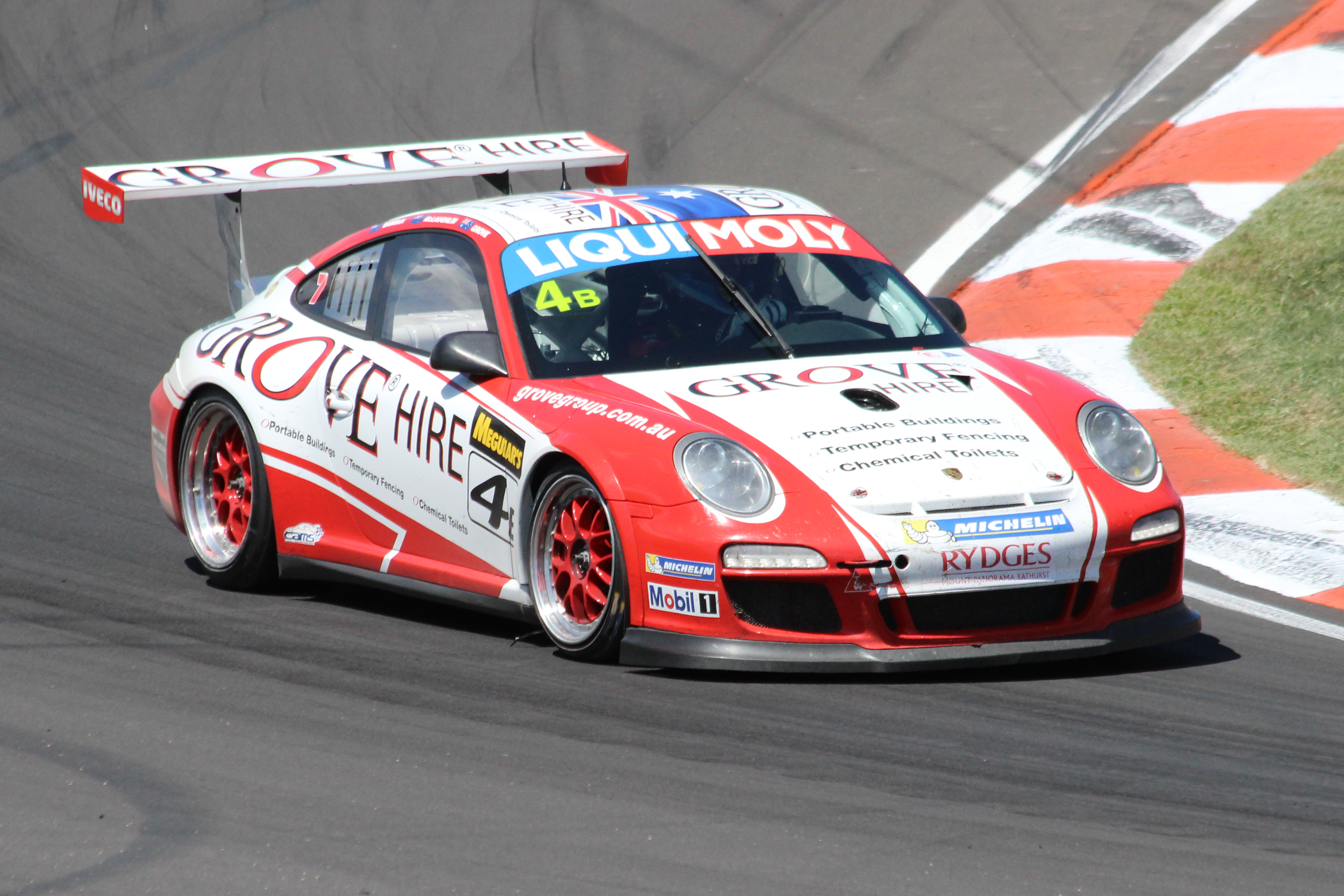
The Class B-winning Porsche 997 GT3 Cup of Earl Bamber, Stephen Grove and Scott McLaughlin

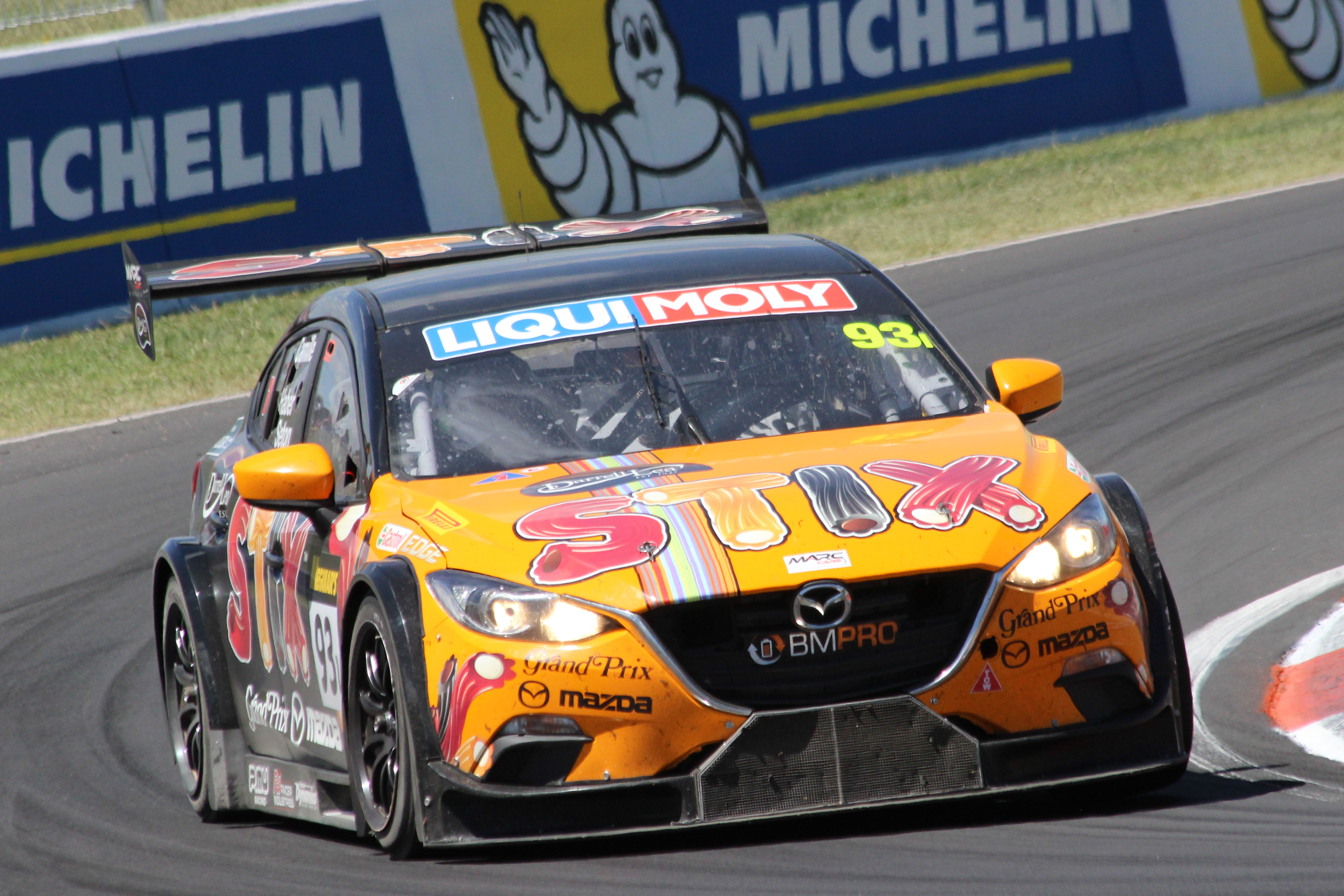
The Class I-winning MARC Mazda3 GTC of Jake Camilleri, Morgan Haber and Aaron Seton.

| Pos. | Class | No. | Team / Entrant | Drivers | Car | Laps | Time/Retired |
| Pos. | Class | No. | Team / Entrant | Drivers | Engine | Laps | Time/Retired |
|---|---|---|---|---|---|---|---|
| 1 | **AP** | **59** | **(Australia) Tekno Autosports** | **(Portugal) Álvaro Parente (New Zealand) Shane van Gisbergen (Australia) Jonathon Webb** | **McLaren 650S GT3** | **297** | **12:01:05.133** |
| 1 | **AP** | **59** | **(Australia) Tekno Autosports** | **(Portugal) Álvaro Parente (New Zealand) Shane van Gisbergen (Australia) Jonathon Webb** | **3.8 L McLaren M838T twin-turbo V8** | **297** | **12:01:05.133** |
| 2 | AP | 1 | (Japan) NISMO Athlete Global Team | (Japan) Katsumasa Chiyo (Australia) Rick Kelly (Germany) Florian Strauss | Nissan GT-R Nismo GT3 | 297 | +1.276 |
| 2 | AP | 1 | (Japan) NISMO Athlete Global Team | (Japan) Katsumasa Chiyo (Australia) Rick Kelly (Germany) Florian Strauss | 3.8 L Nissan VR38DETT twin-turbo V6 | 297 | +1.276 |
| 3 | AP | 10 | (United Kingdom) Bentley Team M-Sport | (United Kingdom) Matt Bell (United Kingdom) Steven Kane (United Kingdom) Guy Smith | Bentley Continental GT3 | 297 | +1:18.503 |
| 3 | AP | 10 | (United Kingdom) Bentley Team M-Sport | (United Kingdom) Matt Bell (United Kingdom) Steven Kane (United Kingdom) Guy Smith | 4.0 L Volkswagen twin-turbo V8 | 297 | +1:18.503 |
| 4 | AP | 2 | (Germany) Phoenix Racing | (Australia) Alex Davison (Belgium) Laurens Vanthoor (Germany) Markus Winkelhock | Audi R8 LMS | 297 | +2:05.621 |
| 4 | AP | 2 | (Germany) Phoenix Racing | (Australia) Alex Davison (Belgium) Laurens Vanthoor (Germany) Markus Winkelhock | 5.2 L FSI 2×DOHC Audi V10 | 297 | +2:05.621 |
| 5 | AP | 36 | (Australia) Erebus Motorsport | (Germany) Nico Bastian (Germany) Thomas Jäger (Australia) David Reynolds | Mercedes-Benz SLS AMG | 296 | +1 lap |
| 5 | AP | 36 | (Australia) Erebus Motorsport | (Germany) Nico Bastian (Germany) Thomas Jäger (Australia) David Reynolds | 6.2 L Mercedes-Benz M159 V8 | 296 | +1 lap |
| 6 | **AA** | **5** | **(Australia) GT Motorsport** | **(Australia) Nathan Antunes (Australia) Barton Mawer (Australia) Greg Taylor** | **Audi R8 LMS** | **294** | **+3 laps** |
| 6 | **AA** | **5** | **(Australia) GT Motorsport** | **(Australia) Nathan Antunes (Australia) Barton Mawer (Australia) Greg Taylor** | **5.2 L FSI 2×DOHC Audi V10** | **294** | **+3 laps** |
| 7 | AP | 31 | (United Kingdom) Bentley Team M-Sport | (Australia) David Russell (Spain) Andy Soucek (Belgium) Maxime Soulet | Bentley Continental GT3 | 293 | +4 laps |
| 7 | AP | 31 | (United Kingdom) Bentley Team M-Sport | (Australia) David Russell (Spain) Andy Soucek (Belgium) Maxime Soulet | 4.0 L Volkswagen twin-turbo V8 | 293 | +4 laps |
| 8 | AP | 75 | (Australia) Jamec Pem Racing | (Australia) Steve McLaughlan (Germany) René Rast (Australia) Garth Tander | Audi R8 LMS | 293 | +4 laps |
| 8 | AP | 75 | (Australia) Jamec Pem Racing | (Australia) Steve McLaughlan (Germany) René Rast (Australia) Garth Tander | 5.2 L FSI 2×DOHC Audi V10 | 293 | +4 laps |
| 9 | AP | 60 | (Australia) Tekno Autosports | (United Kingdom) Robert Bell (Australia) Will Davison (United Kingdom) Andrew Watson | McLaren 650S GT3 | 292 | +5 laps |
| 9 | AP | 60 | (Australia) Tekno Autosports | (United Kingdom) Robert Bell (Australia) Will Davison (United Kingdom) Andrew Watson | 3.8 L McLaren M838T twin-turbo V8 | 292 | +5 laps |
| 10 | AA | 32 | (Australia) Lago Racing | (Australia) Roger Lago (Australia) Steve Owen (Australia) Luke Youlden | Lamborghini Gallardo R-EX | 291 | +6 laps |
| 10 | AA | 32 | (Australia) Lago Racing | (Australia) Roger Lago (Australia) Steve Owen (Australia) Luke Youlden | 5.2 L Lamborghini V10 | 291 | +6 laps |
| 11 | AA | 82 | (New Zealand) International Motorsport | (New Zealand) Rick Armstrong (New Zealand) Andrew Bagnall (New Zealand) Matt Halliday | Audi R8 LMS Ultra | 287 | +10 laps |
| 11 | AA | 82 | (New Zealand) International Motorsport | (New Zealand) Rick Armstrong (New Zealand) Andrew Bagnall (New Zealand) Matt Halliday | 5.2 L FSI 2×DOHC Audi V10 | 287 | +10 laps |
| 12 | **B** | **4** | **(Australia) Grove Motorsport** | **(New Zealand) Earl Bamber (Australia) Stephen Grove (New Zealand) Scott McLaughlin** | **Porsche 997 GT3 Cup** | **285** | **+12 laps** |
| 12 | **B** | **4** | **(Australia) Grove Motorsport** | **(New Zealand) Earl Bamber (Australia) Stephen Grove (New Zealand) Scott McLaughlin** | **3.6 L Porsche H6** | **285** | **+12 laps** |
| 13 | **I** | **93** | **MARC Cars Australia** | **(Australia) Jake Camilleri (Australia) Morgan Haber (Australia) Aaron Seton** | **MARC Mazda3 GTC^{1}** | **280** | **+17 laps** |
| 13 | **I** | **93** | **MARC Cars Australia** | **(Australia) Jake Camilleri (Australia) Morgan Haber (Australia) Aaron Seton** | **5.0 L Ford Coyote V8** | **280** | **+17 laps** |
| 14 | I | 54 | (Australia) Donut King Racing | (Australia) Tony Alford (Australia) Mark Griffith (Australia) Beric Lynton | MARC Focus GTC | 271 | +26 laps |
| 14 | I | 54 | (Australia) Donut King Racing | (Australia) Tony Alford (Australia) Mark Griffith (Australia) Beric Lynton | 5.0 L Ford Coyote V8 | 271 | +26 laps |
| 15 | I | 92 | MARC Cars Australia | (Australia) Michael Benton (Australia) Hadrian Morrall (Australia) Angus Kennard | MARC Focus GTC | 271 | +26 laps |
| 15 | I | 92 | MARC Cars Australia | (Australia) Michael Benton (Australia) Hadrian Morrall (Australia) Angus Kennard | 5.0 L Ford Coyote V8 | 271 | +26 laps |
| 16 | B | 6 | (Australia) Wall Racing | (Australia) Richard Gartner (Australia) Michael O'Donnell (Australia) Indiran Padayachee (Australia) Aaron Zerefos | Porsche 997 GT3 Cup | 270 | +27 laps |
| 16 | B | 6 | (Australia) Wall Racing | (Australia) Richard Gartner (Australia) Michael O'Donnell (Australia) Indiran Padayachee (Australia) Aaron Zerefos | 3.6 L Porsche H6 | 270 | +27 laps |
| 17 | AA | 49 | (Australia) Vicious Rumour Racing | (Australia) Tony DeFelice (Australia) Renato Loberto (Italy) Andrea Montermini (Denmark) Benny Simonsen | Ferrari 458 GT3 | 256 | +41 laps |
| 17 | AA | 49 | (Australia) Vicious Rumour Racing | (Australia) Tony DeFelice (Australia) Renato Loberto (Italy) Andrea Montermini (Denmark) Benny Simonsen | 4.5 L Ferrari F142 V8 | 256 | +41 laps |
| 18 | I | 91 | MARC Cars Australia | (Australia) Lindsay Kearns (Australia) Rob Thomson (Australia) Jimmy Vernon | MARC Focus GTC | 228 | +69 laps |
| 18 | I | 91 | MARC Cars Australia | (Australia) Lindsay Kearns (Australia) Rob Thomson (Australia) Jimmy Vernon | 5.0 L Ford Coyote V8 | 228 | +69 laps |
| 19 | I | 94 | MARC Cars Australia | (Australia) Bryce Fullwood (Australia) Gerard McLeod (Australia) Nick Rowe | MARC Mazda3 GTC | 195 | +102 laps |
| 19 | I | 94 | MARC Cars Australia | (Australia) Bryce Fullwood (Australia) Gerard McLeod (Australia) Nick Rowe | 5.0 L Ford Coyote V8 | 195 | +102 laps |
| 20 | B | 77 | (New Zealand) Team NZ Motorsport | (Singapore) John Curran (Australia) Nick Foster (Australia) Craig Smith (New Zealand) Will Bamber^{2} (Singapore) Graeme Dowsett^{3} | Porsche 997 GT3 Cup | 79 | +218 laps |
| 20 | B | 77 | (New Zealand) Team NZ Motorsport | (Singapore) John Curran (Australia) Nick Foster (Australia) Craig Smith (New Zealand) Will Bamber^{2} (Singapore) Graeme Dowsett^{3} | 3.6 L Porsche H6 | 79 | +218 laps |
| DNF | B | 21 | (Australia) Ashley Seward Motorsport | (Australia) James Bergmuller (New Zealand) Sam Fillmore (Australia) Danny Stutterd | Porsche 997 GT3 Cup | 268 | Out of Fuel |
| DNF | B | 21 | (Australia) Ashley Seward Motorsport | (Australia) James Bergmuller (New Zealand) Sam Fillmore (Australia) Danny Stutterd | 3.6 L Porsche H6 | 268 | Out of Fuel |
| DNF | AA | 40 | (Australia) Supabarn Supermarkets Racing | (Australia) Shae Davies (Australia) James Koundouris (Australia) Theo Koundouris (Australia) Marcus Marshall | Audi R8 LMS | 251 | Tyre Failure |
| DNF | AA | 40 | (Australia) Supabarn Supermarkets Racing | (Australia) Shae Davies (Australia) James Koundouris (Australia) Theo Koundouris (Australia) Marcus Marshall | 5.2 L FSI 2×DOHC Audi V10 | 251 | Tyre Failure |
| DNF | AP | 63 | (Australia) Erebus Motorsport | (United States) Austin Cindric (Germany) Maro Engel (Germany) Bernd Schneider | Mercedes-Benz SLS AMG | 219 | Crash |
| DNF | AP | 63 | (Australia) Erebus Motorsport | (United States) Austin Cindric (Germany) Maro Engel (Germany) Bernd Schneider | 6.2 L Mercedes-Benz M159 V8 | 219 | Crash |
| DNF | AA | 37 | (Australia) Keltic Racing | (New Zealand) Craig Baird (Australia) Klark Quinn (United Kingdom) Tony Quinn | McLaren 650S GT3 | 171 | Spun out/stalled |
| DNF | AA | 37 | (Australia) Keltic Racing | (New Zealand) Craig Baird (Australia) Klark Quinn (United Kingdom) Tony Quinn | 3.8 L McLaren M838T twin-turbo V8 | 171 | Spun out/stalled |
| DNF | AA | 9 | (Australia) Hallmarc Racing | (Australia) Marc Cini (Australia) Mark Eddy (Germany) Christer Jöns | Audi R8 LMS Ultra | 157 | Crash |
| DNF | AA | 9 | (Australia) Hallmarc Racing | (Australia) Marc Cini (Australia) Mark Eddy (Germany) Christer Jöns | 5.2 L FSI 2×DOHC Audi V10 | 157 | Crash |
| DNF | B | 69 | (United Kingdom) APO Sport | (United Kingdom) James May (United Kingdom) Paul May (United Kingdom) Alex Osborne | Porsche 997 GT3 Cup | 149 | Crash |
| DNF | B | 69 | (United Kingdom) APO Sport | (United Kingdom) James May (United Kingdom) Paul May (United Kingdom) Alex Osborne | 3.6 L Porsche H6 | 149 | Crash |
| DNF | AP | 33 | (Germany) MISHUMOTORS | (United Kingdom) Alex Kapadia (Germany) Mirco Schultis (Germany) Patrick Simon (Netherlands) Renger van der Zande | Mercedes-Benz SLS AMG | 133 | Crash |
| DNF | AP | 33 | (Germany) MISHUMOTORS | (United Kingdom) Alex Kapadia (Germany) Mirco Schultis (Germany) Patrick Simon (Netherlands) Renger van der Zande | 6.2 L Mercedes-Benz M159 V8 | 133 | Crash |
| DNF | B | 38 | (Australia) Wall Racing | (Hong Kong) Daniel Bilski (Australia) Paul Tresidder (Australia) David Wall | Porsche 997 GT3 Cup S | 128 | Gearbox |
| DNF | B | 38 | (Australia) Wall Racing | (Hong Kong) Daniel Bilski (Australia) Paul Tresidder (Australia) David Wall | 3.6 L Porsche H6 | 128 | Gearbox |
| DNF | B | 12 | (New Zealand) Motorsport Services Limited | (New Zealand) Allan Dippie (New Zealand) Scott O'Donnell (New Zealand) Chris van der Drift | Porsche 997 GT3 Cup | 128 | Gearbox |
| DNF | B | 12 | (New Zealand) Motorsport Services Limited | (New Zealand) Allan Dippie (New Zealand) Scott O'Donnell (New Zealand) Chris van der Drift | 3.6 L Porsche H6 | 128 | Gearbox |
| DNF | I | 65 | (Australia) Daytona Sports Cars | (Australia) Jamie Augustine (Australia) Dean Lillie (Australia) Benjamin Schoots | Daytona Sportscar | 126 | Oil Pressure |
| DNF | I | 65 | (Australia) Daytona Sports Cars | (Australia) Jamie Augustine (Australia) Dean Lillie (Australia) Benjamin Schoots | 6.0 L GM LS1 V8 | 126 | Oil Pressure |
| DNF | I | 28 | (Australia) GWS Personnel Motorsport | (Australia) Will Cauchi (United Kingdom) David Cox (Australia) Ric Shaw (Australia) Jake Williams | BMW 335i | 107 | Not Classified (last lap too slow) |
| DNF | I | 28 | (Australia) GWS Personnel Motorsport | (Australia) Will Cauchi (United Kingdom) David Cox (Australia) Ric Shaw (Australia) Jake Williams | 3.0 L BMW N55 twin-turbo I6 | 107 | Not Classified (last lap too slow) |
| DNF | I | 16 | (Germany) PROsport Performance | (United Kingdom) Adam Christodoulou (Germany) Fabian Hamprecht (Belgium) Nico Verdonck (Germany) Jörg Viebahn | Porsche Cayman Pro 4 | 92 | Crash |
| DNF | I | 16 | (Germany) PROsport Performance | (United Kingdom) Adam Christodoulou (Germany) Fabian Hamprecht (Belgium) Nico Verdonck (Germany) Jörg Viebahn | 3.4 L Porsche H6 | 92 | Crash |
| DNF | AP | 88 | (Australia) Maranello Motorsport | (Australia) Tony D'Alberto (Australia) Grant Denyer (Finland) Mika Salo (Finland) Toni Vilander | Ferrari 458 GT3 | 63 | Crash Damage |
| DNF | AP | 88 | (Australia) Maranello Motorsport | (Australia) Tony D'Alberto (Australia) Grant Denyer (Finland) Mika Salo (Finland) Toni Vilander | 4.5 L Ferrari F142 V8 | 63 | Crash Damage |
| DNF | AP | 74 | (Australia) Jamec Pem Racing | (Germany) Christopher Haase (Italy) Marco Mapelli (Germany) Christopher Mies | Audi R8 LMS | 50 | Tyre Failure |
| DNF | AP | 74 | (Australia) Jamec Pem Racing | (Germany) Christopher Haase (Italy) Marco Mapelli (Germany) Christopher Mies | 5.2 L FSI 2×DOHC Audi V10 | 50 | Tyre Failure |
| DNF | AA | 11 | (Australia) Objective Racing | (Australia) Matt Campbell (Australia) Warren Luff (Australia) Tim Slade (Australia) Tony Walls | McLaren 650S GT3 | 49 | Crash |
| DNF | AA | 11 | (Australia) Objective Racing | (Australia) Matt Campbell (Australia) Warren Luff (Australia) Tim Slade (Australia) Tony Walls | 3.8 L McLaren M838T twin-turbo V8 | 49 | Crash |
| DNF | AA | 62 | (Australia) Performance West Motorsport | (Australia) Scott Andrews (Australia) Nick Percat (Australia) Peter Rullo | Lamborghini Gallardo LP600 | 1 | Suspension |
| DNF | AA | 62 | (Australia) Performance West Motorsport | (Australia) Scott Andrews (Australia) Nick Percat (Australia) Peter Rullo | 5.2 L Lamborghini V10 | 1 | Suspension |
| DNS | AA | 48 | (Australia) M Motorsport | (New Zealand) John McIntyre (Australia) Justin McMillan (Australia) Dale Wood (Australia) Glen Wood | Lamborghini Gallardo LP560-4 | | Crash in Practice 5 |
| DNS | AA | 48 | (Australia) M Motorsport | (New Zealand) John McIntyre (Australia) Justin McMillan (Australia) Dale Wood (Australia) Glen Wood | 5.2 L Lamborghini V10 | | Crash in Practice 5 |

^1 – The #93 MARC Cars Australia entry was listed in both the official entry list and the official results as a MARC Focus GTC but it was actually a MARC Mazda3 GTC.
^2 – Will Bamber was unable to drive in the race following a crash during the qualifying session.
^3 – Greame Dowsett was unable to drive in the race following a pre-race injury. He was replaced by Nick Foster

- Class winners are shown in bold.
- Race time of winning car: 12:01:05.1330
- Fastest race lap: 2:01.5670 – Shane van Gisbergen
