= 2015 Bathurst 12 Hour =

Endurance motor racing event

2015 Liqui Moly Bathurst 12 Hour

Seasons
- ← 2014 2016 →

Layout of the Mount Panorama Circuit

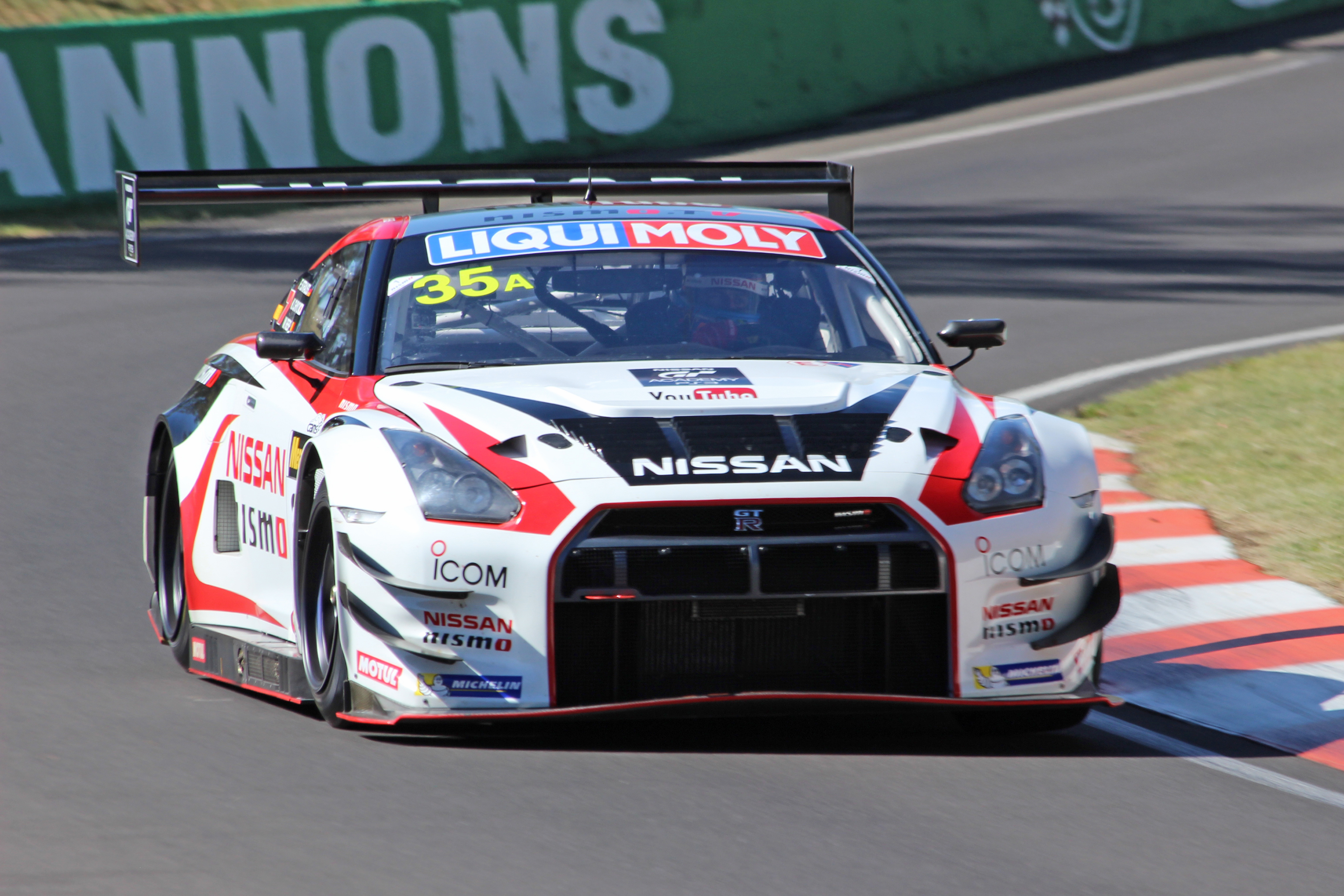
The race and Class AA-winning Nissan GT-R Nismo GT3 of Katsumasa Chiyo, Wolfgang Reip and Florian Strauss.

The 2015 Liqui Moly Bathurst 12 Hour was an endurance race for a variety of GT and touring car classes, including: GT3 cars, GT4 cars and Group 3E Series Production Cars. The event, which was staged at the Mount Panorama Circuit, near Bathurst, in New South Wales, Australia on 8 February 2015, was the thirteenth running of the Bathurst 12 Hour.

53 cars were entered for the race and 50 cars started the race, with two entries withdrawn following crashes in practice and the other due to drivers being injured in a road accident prior to the event. Katsumasa Chiyo, Wolfgang Reip and Florian Strauss won the event driving a Nissan GT-R Nismo GT3. Reip and Strauss had both come through the GT Academy programme.

The highlight of the race came in the closing laps. The Nissan had been racing conservatively all day, just staying on the lead lap and in touch with the leaders. Matt Bell led the field in one of the M-Sport Bentleys, ahead of Laurens Vanthoor in the Phoenix Racing Audi with Chiyo in third. Stefan Mucke and Dean Canto were also on the lead lap. There were a few late safety car periods, with the last leaving two laps of racing to the finish. Once racing began Chiyo took second at the first corner before taking the lead going up Mountain Straight. As Chiyo built a gap over his rivals, a battle developed for second place, with Bell ahead of Vanthoor and Mucke. Mucke passed Vanthoor for third going down Conrod Straight on the final lap before attempting to pass Bell at the final corner. Mucke made contact with Bell, sending him into a slide, while Vanthoor drove around the outside of both cars to take second place behind Chiyo. Mucke took third while Bell dropped to fourth.

== Class structure ==
Cars competed in the following five classes.

- Class A – GT3 Outright
  - Class AP – GT3 Pro-Am, for driver combinations including one unseeded driver.
  - Class AA – GT3 Am, for driver combinations including two or three unseeded drivers.
- Class B – GT3 Cup Cars
- Class C – GT4
- Class D – Invitational (Production)
- Class I – Invitational (Non Production)

== Official results ==
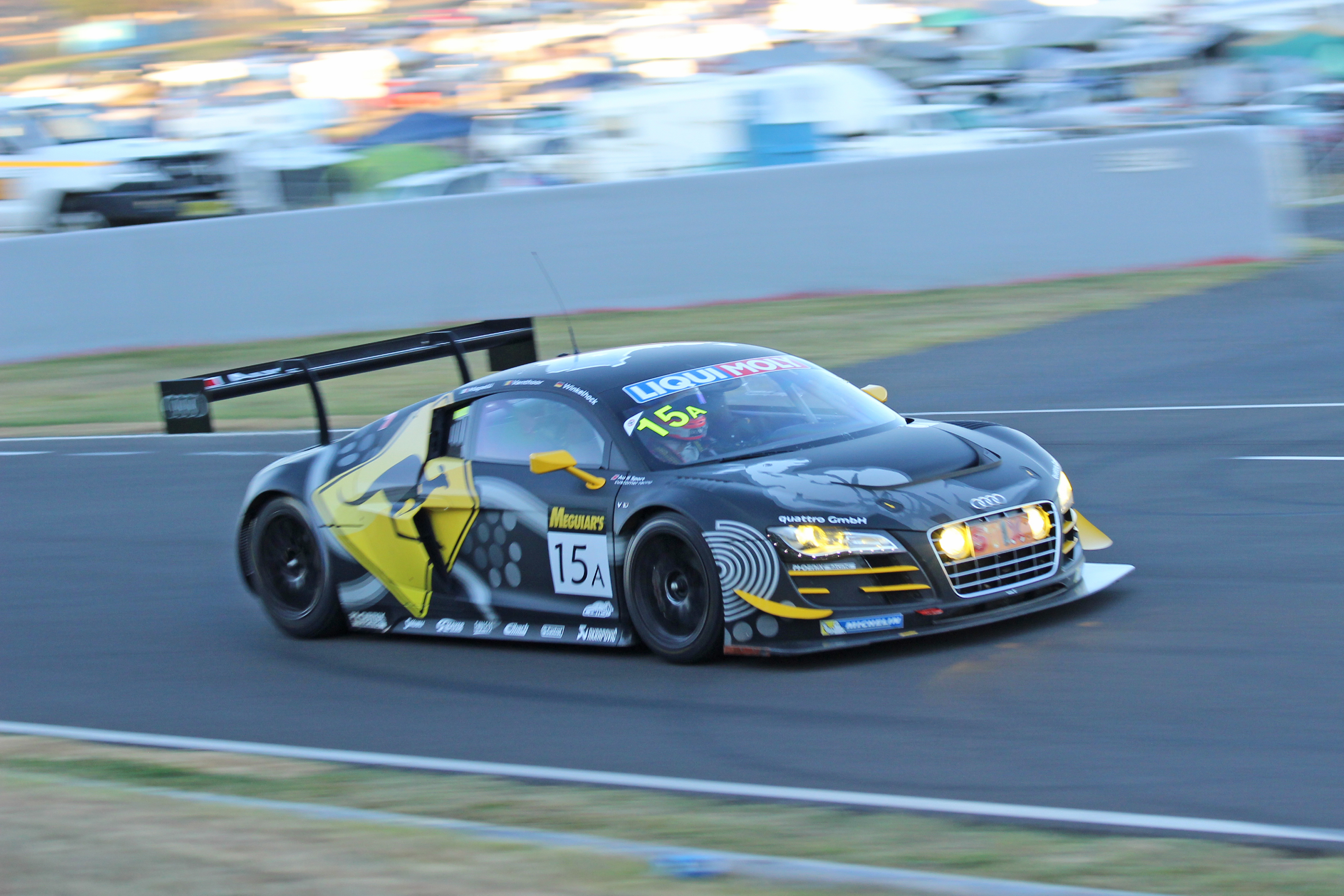
The Class AP-winning Audi R8 LMS Ultra of Marco Mapelli, Laurens Vanthoor and Markus Winkelhock.

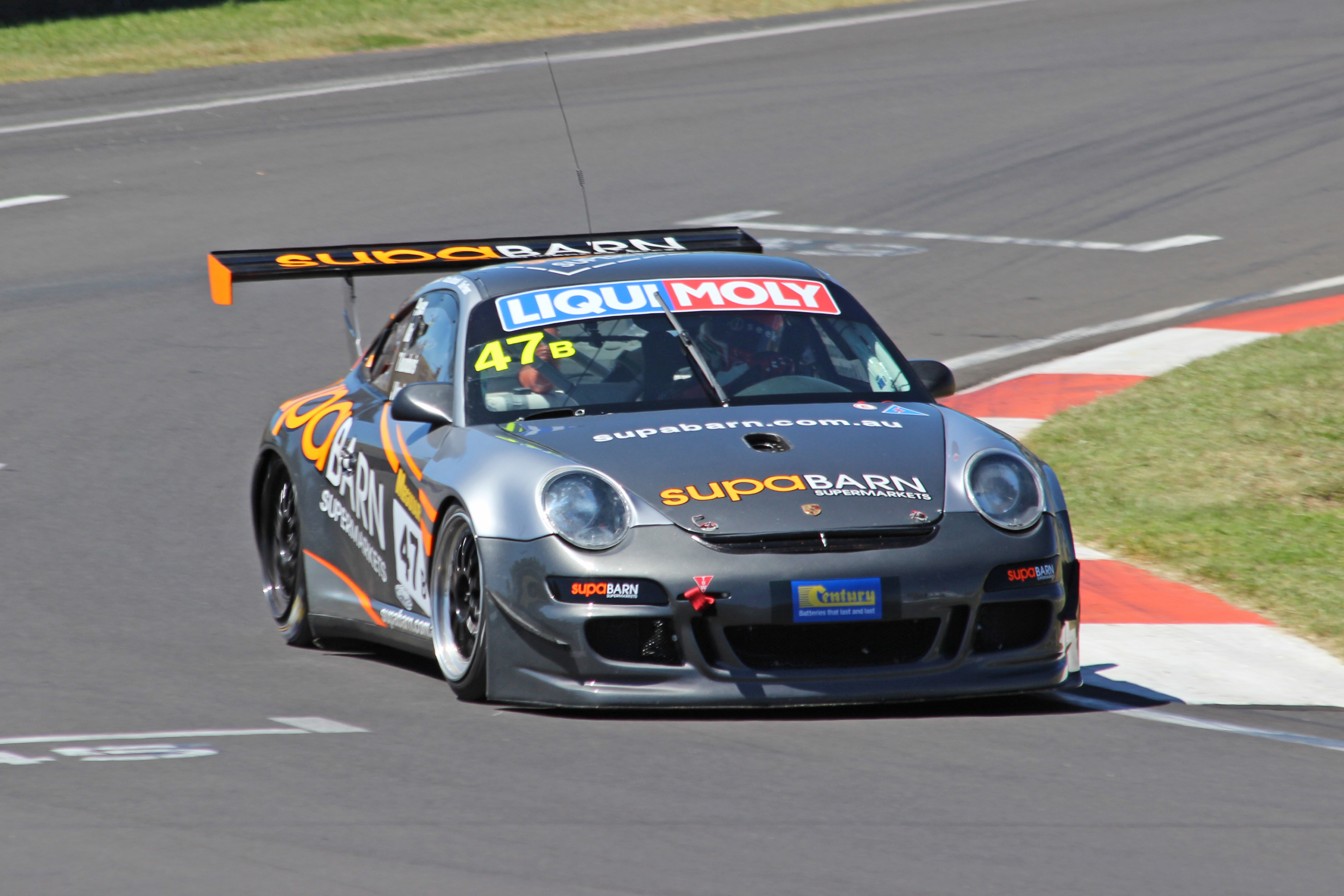
The Class B-winning Porsche 997 GT3 Cup S of James Koundouris, Theo Koundouris, Marcus Marshall and Sam Power.

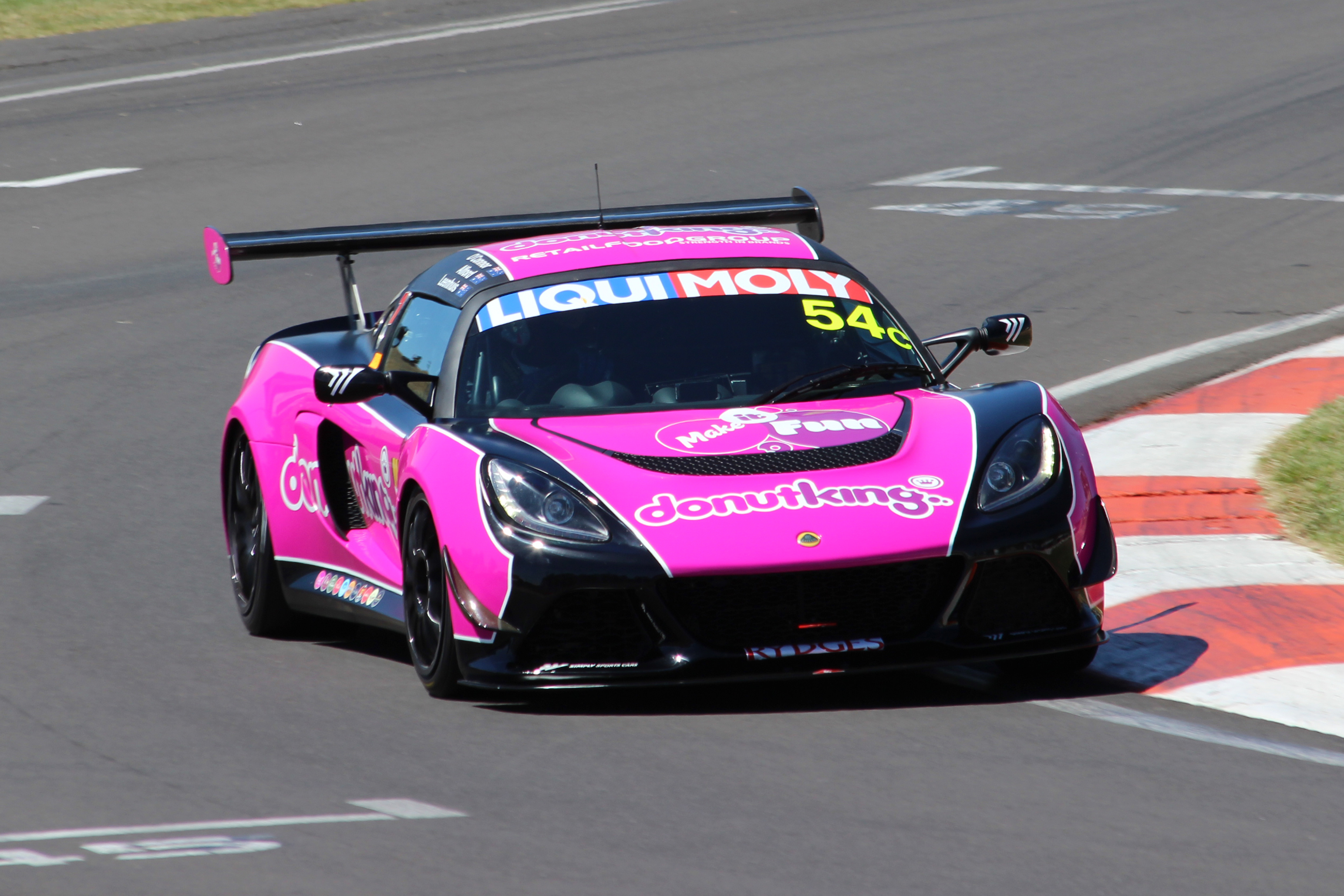
The Class C-winning Lotus Exige Cup R of Tony Alford, Peter Leemhuis and Mark O'Connor.

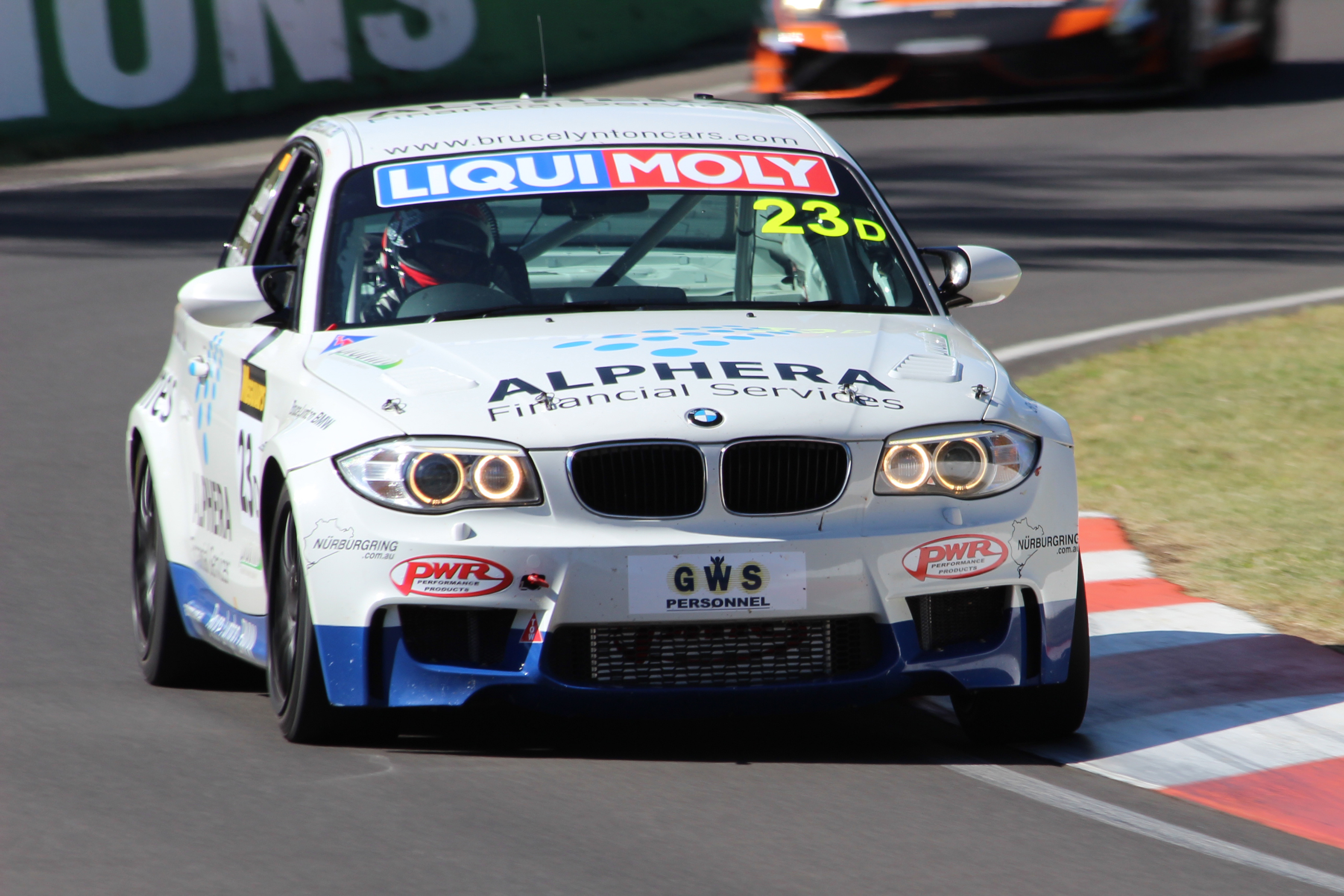
The Class D-winning BMW 1M of Beric Lynton, John Modystach and Robert Thomson.

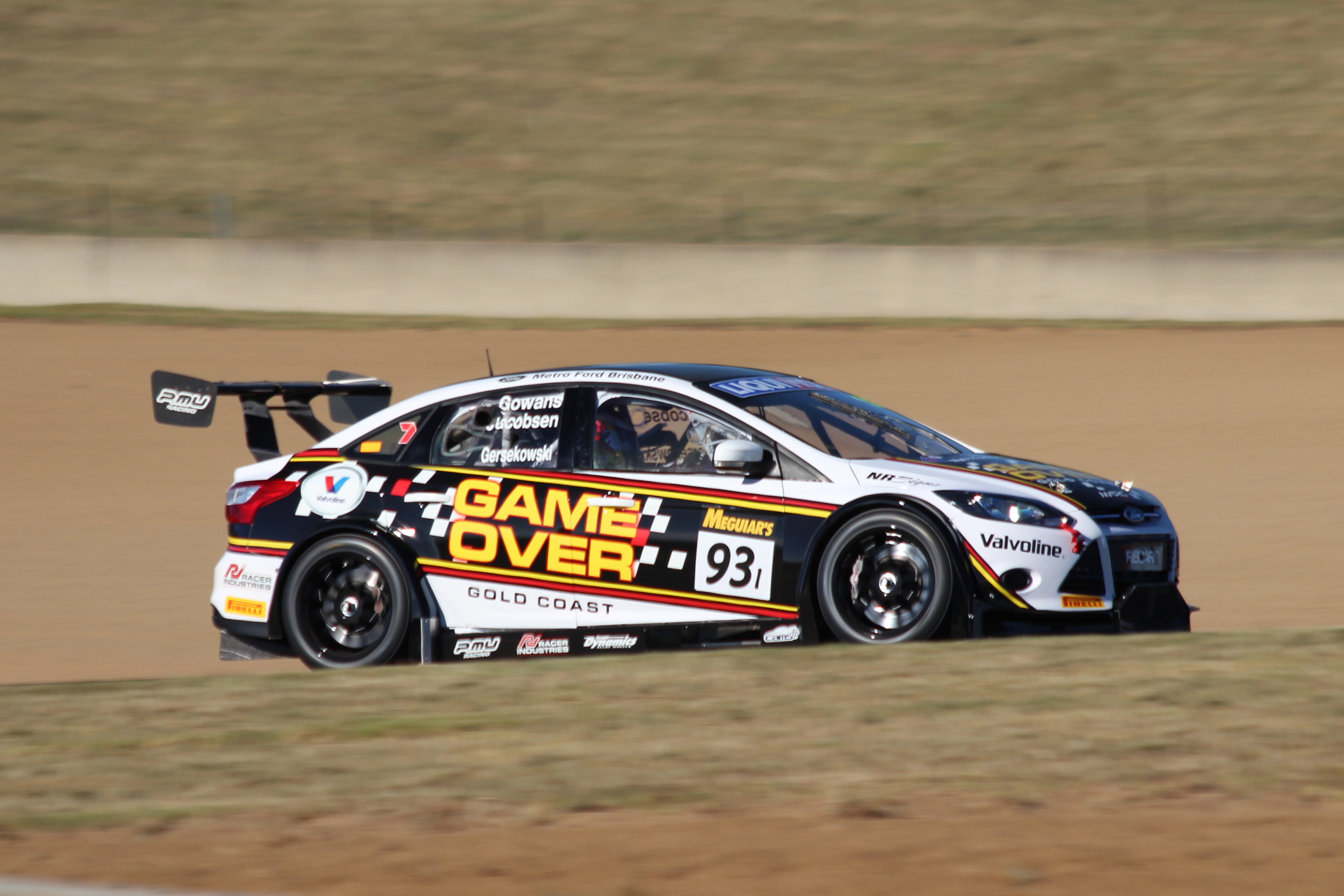
The Class I-winning MARC Focus GTC of Ben Gersekowski, Adam Gowans and Garry Jacobson.

Pos.	Class	No.	Team / Entrant	Drivers	Car	Laps	Time/Retired
Pos.	Class	No.	Team / Entrant	Drivers	Engine	Laps	Time/Retired
1	**AA**	**35**	**(Japan) NISMO Athlete Global Team**	**(Japan) Katsumasa Chiyo (Belgium) Wolfgang Reip (Germany) Florian Strauss**	**Nissan GT-R Nismo GT3**	**269**	**12:00:11.0280**
1	**AA**	**35**	**(Japan) NISMO Athlete Global Team**	**(Japan) Katsumasa Chiyo (Belgium) Wolfgang Reip (Germany) Florian Strauss**	**3.8 L Nissan VR38DETT twin-turbo V6**	**269**	**12:00:11.0280**
2	**AP**	**15**	**(Germany) Phoenix Racing**	**(Italy) Marco Mapelli (Belgium) Laurens Vanthoor (Germany) Markus Winkelhock**	**Audi R8 LMS Ultra**	**269**	**+2.4529**
2	**AP**	**15**	**(Germany) Phoenix Racing**	**(Italy) Marco Mapelli (Belgium) Laurens Vanthoor (Germany) Markus Winkelhock**	**5.2 L FSI 2×DOHC Audi V10**	**269**	**+2.4529**
3	AP	97	(Hong Kong) Craft-Bamboo Racing	(United Kingdom) Alex MacDowall (Germany) Stefan Mücke (Hong Kong) Darryl O'Young	Aston Martin Vantage GT3	269	+2.8016
3	AP	97	(Hong Kong) Craft-Bamboo Racing	(United Kingdom) Alex MacDowall (Germany) Stefan Mücke (Hong Kong) Darryl O'Young	6.0 L Aston Martin V12	269	+2.8016
4	AP	10	(United Kingdom) Bentley Team M-Sport	(United Kingdom) Matt Bell (United Kingdom) Steven Kane (United Kingdom) Guy Smith	Bentley Continental GT3	269	+3.7821
4	AP	10	(United Kingdom) Bentley Team M-Sport	(United Kingdom) Matt Bell (United Kingdom) Steven Kane (United Kingdom) Guy Smith	4.0 L Volkswagen twin-turbo V8	269	+3.7821
5	AP	36	(Australia) Erebus Motorsport	(Australia) Dean Canto (Australia) Jack Le Brocq (Australia) Richard Muscat	Mercedes-Benz SLS AMG	269	+3.9430
5	AP	36	(Australia) Erebus Motorsport	(Australia) Dean Canto (Australia) Jack Le Brocq (Australia) Richard Muscat	6.2 L Mercedes-Benz M159 V8	269	+3.9430
6	AA	49	(Australia) Vicious Rumour Racing	(Australia) Renato Loberto (Italy) Andrea Montermini (Denmark) Benny Simonsen	Ferrari 458 Italia GT3	268	+1 lap
6	AA	49	(Australia) Vicious Rumour Racing	(Australia) Renato Loberto (Italy) Andrea Montermini (Denmark) Benny Simonsen	4.5 L Ferrari F142 V8	268	+1 lap
7	AP	32	(Australia) Lago Racing	(Australia) Roger Lago (Australia) Steve Owen (Australia) David Russell	Lamborghini Gallardo LP600	268	+1 lap
7	AP	32	(Australia) Lago Racing	(Australia) Roger Lago (Australia) Steve Owen (Australia) David Russell	5.2 L Lamborghini V10	268	+1 lap
8	AP	33	(Singapore) Clearwater Racing	(Republic of Ireland) Matt Griffin (Singapore) Weng Sun Mok (Finland) Toni Vilander	Ferrari 458 Italia GT3	268	+1 lap
8	AP	33	(Singapore) Clearwater Racing	(Republic of Ireland) Matt Griffin (Singapore) Weng Sun Mok (Finland) Toni Vilander	4.5 L Ferrari F142 V8	268	+1 lap
9	AP	16	(Germany) Phoenix Racing	(Austria) Felix Baumgartner (Germany) Christopher Haase (Monaco) Stéphane Ortelli	Audi R8 LMS Ultra	268	+1 lap
9	AP	16	(Germany) Phoenix Racing	(Austria) Felix Baumgartner (Germany) Christopher Haase (Monaco) Stéphane Ortelli	5.2 L FSI 2×DOHC Audi V10	268	+1 lap
10	AA	9	(Australia) Hallmarc Racing	(Australia) Marc Cini (Australia) Mark Eddy (Germany) Christopher Mies	Audi R8 LMS Ultra	267	+2 laps
10	AA	9	(Australia) Hallmarc Racing	(Australia) Marc Cini (Australia) Mark Eddy (Germany) Christopher Mies	5.2 L FSI 2×DOHC Audi V10	267	+2 laps
11	AP	12	(United States) Competition Motorsports	(Australia) David Calvert-Jones (United States) Patrick Long (New Zealand) Chris Pither	Porsche 997 GT3-R	267	+2 laps
11	AP	12	(United States) Competition Motorsports	(Australia) David Calvert-Jones (United States) Patrick Long (New Zealand) Chris Pither	4.0 L Porsche H6	267	+2 laps
12	AA	75	(Australia) Jamec Pem Racing	(Australia) Dean Koutsoumidis (Australia) Steve McLaughlin (United Kingdom) James Winslow	Audi R8 LMS Ultra	265	+4 laps
12	AA	75	(Australia) Jamec Pem Racing	(Australia) Dean Koutsoumidis (Australia) Steve McLaughlin (United Kingdom) James Winslow	5.2 L FSI 2×DOHC Audi V10	265	+4 laps
13	AA	74	(Australia) Jamec Pem Racing	(Australia) Greg Crick (United Kingdom) Alessandro Latif (Australia) Warren Luff	Audi R8 LMS Ultra	265	+4 laps
13	AA	74	(Australia) Jamec Pem Racing	(Australia) Greg Crick (United Kingdom) Alessandro Latif (Australia) Warren Luff	5.2 L FSI 2×DOHC Audi V10	265	+4 laps
14	AA	2	(Australia) Fitzgerald Racing	(Australia) Michael Almond (Australia) Peter Fitzgerald (New Zealand) Matt Halliday	Audi R8 LMS Ultra	264	+5 laps
14	AA	2	(Australia) Fitzgerald Racing	(Australia) Michael Almond (Australia) Peter Fitzgerald (New Zealand) Matt Halliday	5.2 L FSI 2×DOHC Audi V10	264	+5 laps
15	**I**	**93**	**MARC Cars Australia**	**(Australia) Ben Gersekowski (Australia) Adam Gowans (Australia) Garry Jacobson**	**MARC Ford Focus GTC**	**262**	**+7 laps**
15	**I**	**93**	**MARC Cars Australia**	**(Australia) Ben Gersekowski (Australia) Adam Gowans (Australia) Garry Jacobson**	**5.0 L Ford Coyote V8**	**262**	**+7 laps**
16	**B**	**47**	**(Australia) Supabarn Supermarkets Racing**	**(Australia) James Koundouris (Australia) Theo Koundouris (Australia) Marcus Marshall (Australia) Sam Power**	**Porsche 997 GT3 Cup S**	**261**	**+8 laps**
16	**B**	**47**	**(Australia) Supabarn Supermarkets Racing**	**(Australia) James Koundouris (Australia) Theo Koundouris (Australia) Marcus Marshall (Australia) Sam Power**	3.8 L Porsche H6	**261**	**+8 laps**
17	B	4	(Australia) Grove Motorsport	(United Kingdom) Ben Barker (Australia) Stephen Grove (Australia) Luke Youlden	Porsche 997 GT3 Cup	259	+10 laps
17	B	4	(Australia) Grove Motorsport	(United Kingdom) Ben Barker (Australia) Stephen Grove (Australia) Luke Youlden	3.8 L Porsche H6	259	+10 laps
18	B	64	(New Zealand) Motorsport Services	(Australia) Tim Macrow (United Kingdom) Devon Modell (Australia) Peter Rullo	Porsche 997 GT3 Cup	257	+12 laps
18	B	64	(New Zealand) Motorsport Services	(Australia) Tim Macrow (United Kingdom) Devon Modell (Australia) Peter Rullo	3.8 L Porsche H6	257	+12 laps
19	B	21	(New Zealand) Motorsport Services	(New Zealand) Sam Fillmore (Australia) Ross Lilley (Australia) Danny Stutterd	Porsche 997 GT3 Cup	256	+13 laps
19	B	21	(New Zealand) Motorsport Services	(New Zealand) Sam Fillmore (Australia) Ross Lilley (Australia) Danny Stutterd	3.8 L Porsche H6	256	+13 laps
20	B	68	(New Zealand) Motorsport Services	(Australia) Angus Chapel (Australia) Xavier West (Hong Kong) Mark Whyman	Porsche 997 GT3 Cup	252	+17 laps
20	B	68	(New Zealand) Motorsport Services	(Australia) Angus Chapel (Australia) Xavier West (Hong Kong) Mark Whyman	3.8 L Porsche H6	252	+17 laps
21	AA	63	(Australia) Erebus Motorsport	(United States) Austin Cindric (Australia) Simon Hodge (Australia) Nathan Morcom	Mercedes-Benz SLS AMG	251	+18 laps
21	AA	63	(Australia) Erebus Motorsport	(United States) Austin Cindric (Australia) Simon Hodge (Australia) Nathan Morcom	6.2 L Mercedes-Benz M159 V8	251	+18 laps
22	B	50	(Australia) Team LHI	(Australia) Jeff Bobik (Australia) Nick Cresswell (Australia) John Goodacre (New Zealand) Terry Knight	Porsche 997 GT3 Cup	251	+18 laps
22	B	50	(Australia) Team LHI	(Australia) Jeff Bobik (Australia) Nick Cresswell (Australia) John Goodacre (New Zealand) Terry Knight	3.8 L Porsche H6	251	+18 laps
23	AA	52	(United Kingdom) Motionsport	(United Kingdom) Ben Gower (United Kingdom) Gordon Shedden (United Kingdom) Pete Storey	Aston Martin Vantage GT3	250	+19 laps
23	AA	52	(United Kingdom) Motionsport	(United Kingdom) Ben Gower (United Kingdom) Gordon Shedden (United Kingdom) Pete Storey	6.0 L Aston Martin V12	250	+19 laps
24	**C**	**54**	**(Australia) Donut King Racing**	**(Australia) Tony Alford (Australia) Peter Leemhuis (Australia) Mark O'Connor**	**Lotus Exige Cup R**	**249**	**+20 laps**
24	**C**	**54**	**(Australia) Donut King Racing**	**(Australia) Tony Alford (Australia) Peter Leemhuis (Australia) Mark O'Connor**	**3.5 L Toyota 2GR-FE supercharged V6**	**249**	**+20 laps**
25	AA	99	(Hong Kong) Craft-Bamboo Racing	(France) Jean-Marc Merlin (Australia) Jonathon Venter (Hong Kong) Frank Yu	Aston Martin Vantage GT3	248	+21 laps
25	AA	99	(Hong Kong) Craft-Bamboo Racing	(France) Jean-Marc Merlin (Australia) Jonathon Venter (Hong Kong) Frank Yu	6.0 L Aston Martin V12	248	+21 laps
26	C	76	(Switzerland) Aston Martin Saint Gallen	(Switzerland) Andreas Baenziger (Austria) Florian Kamelger (United Kingdom) Christopher Porritt	Aston Martin Vantage GT4	245	+24 laps
26	C	76	(Switzerland) Aston Martin Saint Gallen	(Switzerland) Andreas Baenziger (Austria) Florian Kamelger (United Kingdom) Christopher Porritt	4.7 L Aston Martin V8	245	+24 laps
27	**D**	**23**	**(Australia) Bruce Lynton BMW**	**(Australia) Beric Lynton (Australia) John Modystach (Australia) Rob Thomson**	**BMW 1M**	**242**	**+27 laps**
27	**D**	**23**	**(Australia) Bruce Lynton BMW**	**(Australia) Beric Lynton (Australia) John Modystach (Australia) Rob Thomson**	**3.0 L BMW N54 twin-turbo I6**	**242**	**+27 laps**
28	D	28	(Australia) GWS Personnel Motorsport	(Australia) Matt Chahda (Australia) Steve Devjak (Australia) Ric Shaw (Australia) Jake Williams	BMW 335i	239	+30 laps
28	D	28	(Australia) GWS Personnel Motorsport	(Australia) Matt Chahda (Australia) Steve Devjak (Australia) Ric Shaw (Australia) Jake Williams	3.0 L BMW N55 twin-turbo I6	239	+30 laps
29	I	43	(Australia) Stawell Cartage	(Australia) Shane Bradford (Australia) Phil Crompton (Australia) Michael Robinson (Australia) Shane Woodman	Mazda RX-8	234	+35 laps
29	I	43	(Australia) Stawell Cartage	(Australia) Shane Bradford (Australia) Phil Crompton (Australia) Michael Robinson (Australia) Shane Woodman	2.0 L Mazda 3-rotor	234	+35 laps
30	B	6	(Australia) Wall Racing	(Australia) Garth Duffy (Australia) Richard Gartner (Australia) Michael Hector (Australia) Aaron Zerefos	Porsche 997 GT3 Cup	206	+63 laps
30	B	6	(Australia) Wall Racing	(Australia) Garth Duffy (Australia) Richard Gartner (Australia) Michael Hector (Australia) Aaron Zerefos	3.6 L Porsche H6	206	+63 laps
31	D	18	(Australia) Sherrin Rentals Racing	(Australia) Grant Sherrin (Australia) Iain Sherrin (Australia) Mike Sherrin	BMW 135i	203	+66 laps
31	D	18	(Australia) Sherrin Rentals Racing	(Australia) Grant Sherrin (Australia) Iain Sherrin (Australia) Mike Sherrin	3.0 L BMW N55 twin-turbo I6	203	+66 laps
32	B	66	(New Zealand) Motorsport Services	(New Zealand) Chris van der Drift (United Kingdom) Frank Lyons (United Kingdom) Michael Lyons (New Zealand) Scott O'Donnell^{1} (New Zealand) Hayden Knighton^{1}	Porsche 997 GT3 Cup	192	+77 laps
32	B	66	(New Zealand) Motorsport Services	(New Zealand) Chris van der Drift (United Kingdom) Frank Lyons (United Kingdom) Michael Lyons (New Zealand) Scott O'Donnell^{1} (New Zealand) Hayden Knighton^{1}	3.8 L Porsche H6	192	+77 laps
33	D	65	(Australia) Daytona Sports Cars	(Australia) Jamie Augustine (Australia) Ray Hislop (Australia) Benjamin Schoots	Daytona Sportscar	173	+96 laps
33	D	65	(Australia) Daytona Sports Cars	(Australia) Jamie Augustine (Australia) Ray Hislop (Australia) Benjamin Schoots	6.0 L GM LS1 V8	173	+96 laps
34	I	41	(Australia) Stawell Cartage	(Australia) Ian Cowley (New Zealand) Bruce Henley (Australia) Mark King (Australia) Jason Walsh	Mazda RX-8	149	+120 laps
34	I	41	(Australia) Stawell Cartage	(Australia) Ian Cowley (New Zealand) Bruce Henley (Australia) Mark King (Australia) Jason Walsh	2.0 L Mazda 3-rotor	149	+120 laps
DNF	AA	8	(Australia) Flying B Motorsport	(Australia) John Bowe (Australia) David Brabham (Australia) Peter Edwards	Bentley Continental GT3	254	Crash
DNF	AA	8	(Australia) Flying B Motorsport	(Australia) John Bowe (Australia) David Brabham (Australia) Peter Edwards	4.0 L Volkswagen twin-turbo V8	254	Crash
DNF	AP	11	(United Kingdom) Bentley Team M-Sport	(Germany) Maximilian Buhk (Switzerland) Harold Primat (Spain) Andy Soucek	Bentley Continental GT3	245	Drivetrain
DNF	AP	11	(United Kingdom) Bentley Team M-Sport	(Germany) Maximilian Buhk (Switzerland) Harold Primat (Spain) Andy Soucek	4.0 L Volkswagen twin-turbo V8	245	Drivetrain
DNF	AA	27	(New Zealand) Trass Family Motorsport	(New Zealand) Jono Lester (New Zealand) John McIntyre (New Zealand) Graeme Smyth	Ferrari 458 Italia GT3	221	Overheating
DNF	AA	27	(New Zealand) Trass Family Motorsport	(New Zealand) Jono Lester (New Zealand) John McIntyre (New Zealand) Graeme Smyth	4.5 L Ferrari F142 V8	221	Overheating
DNF	I	91	MARC Cars Australia	(Netherlands) Ivo Breukers (Australia) Jake Camilleri (Papua New Guinea) Keith Kassulke	MARC Mazda3 GTC	203	Crash
DNF	I	91	MARC Cars Australia	(Netherlands) Ivo Breukers (Australia) Jake Camilleri (Papua New Guinea) Keith Kassulke	5.0 L Ford Coyote V8	203	Crash
DNF	AA	7	(Australia) Garth Walden Racing	(Australia) Dean Grant (Australia) Ash Samadi (Australia) Max Twigg	Mercedes-Benz SLS AMG	171	Crash
DNF	AA	7	(Australia) Garth Walden Racing	(Australia) Dean Grant (Australia) Ash Samadi (Australia) Max Twigg	6.2 L Mercedes-Benz M159 V8	171	Crash
DNF	AA	77	(Italy) AF Corse	(Italy) Michele Rugolo (Australia) Steve Wyatt (Italy) Davide Rigon	Ferrari 458 Italia GT3	163	Crash
DNF	AA	77	(Italy) AF Corse	(Italy) Michele Rugolo (Australia) Steve Wyatt (Italy) Davide Rigon	4.5 L Ferrari F142 V8	163	Crash
DNF	AP	48	(Australia) M Motorsport	(New Zealand) Craig Baird (Australia) Justin McMillan (New Zealand) Steven Richards	Lamborghini Gallardo LP560-4	129	Gearbox
DNF	AP	48	(Australia) M Motorsport	(New Zealand) Craig Baird (Australia) Justin McMillan (New Zealand) Steven Richards	5.2 L Lamborghini V10	129	Gearbox
DNF	AA	29	(Australia) Trofeo Motorsport	(Italy) Ivan Capelli (Australia) Jim Manolios (Australia) Ryan Millier	Ferrari 458 Italia GT3	114	Crash
DNF	AA	29	(Australia) Trofeo Motorsport	(Italy) Ivan Capelli (Australia) Jim Manolios (Australia) Ryan Millier	4.5 L Ferrari F142 V8	114	Crash
DNF	C	73	(Australia) TM Motorsports	(Australia) Grant Bromley (Australia) Robert Hackwood (Australia) Michael Hovey (Australia) Tony Martin	Ginetta G50 GT4	112	Bellhousing failure
DNF	C	73	(Australia) TM Motorsports	(Australia) Grant Bromley (Australia) Robert Hackwood (Australia) Michael Hovey (Australia) Tony Martin	3.5 L Ford Cyclone V6	112	Bellhousing failure
DNF	I	92	MARC Cars Australia	(Australia) Michael Benton (Australia) Tim Miles (Australia) Hadrian Morrall	MARC Ford Focus GTC	106	Crash
DNF	I	92	MARC Cars Australia	(Australia) Michael Benton (Australia) Tim Miles (Australia) Hadrian Morrall	5.0 L Ford Coyote V8	106	Crash
DNF	AA	5	(Australia) Rod Salmon Racing	(Australia) Nathan Antunes (United Kingdom) Oliver Gavin (Australia) Rod Salmon	Audi R8 LMS Ultra	103	Crash
DNF	AA	5	(Australia) Rod Salmon Racing	(Australia) Nathan Antunes (United Kingdom) Oliver Gavin (Australia) Rod Salmon	5.2 L FSI 2×DOHC Audi V10	103	Crash
DNF	D	55	(Australia) Kintyre Racing	(Australia) Matthew Cherry (Australia) Glyn Crimp (Australia) Stuart Kostera	Audi TT RS	85	Crash
DNF	D	55	(Australia) Kintyre Racing	(Australia) Matthew Cherry (Australia) Glyn Crimp (Australia) Stuart Kostera	2.5 L R5 TFSI Audi I5	85	Crash
DNF	AA	59	(Australia) Keltic Racing	(France) Kévin Estre (Australia) Klark Quinn (United Kingdom) Tony Quinn	McLaren MP4-12C GT3	80	Spun off
DNF	AA	59	(Australia) Keltic Racing	(France) Kévin Estre (Australia) Klark Quinn (United Kingdom) Tony Quinn	3.8 L McLaren M838T twin-turbo V8	80	Spun off
DNF	AA	51	(Australia) AMAC Motorsport	(Australia) Matt Campbell (Australia) Andrew Macpherson (Australia) Bradley Shiels	Porsche 997 GT3-R	41	Crash
DNF	AA	51	(Australia) AMAC Motorsport	(Australia) Matt Campbell (Australia) Andrew Macpherson (Australia) Bradley Shiels	4.0 L Porsche H6	41	Crash
DNF	B	14	(Australia) Peter Conroy Motorsport	(Australia) Tony Bates (Australia) Peter Conroy (Australia) Grant Denyer	Porsche 997 GT3 Cup	36	Crash
DNF	B	14	(Australia) Peter Conroy Motorsport	(Australia) Tony Bates (Australia) Peter Conroy (Australia) Grant Denyer	3.8 L Porsche H6	36	Crash
DNF	D	42	(Australia) Hallmark Homes	(New Zealand) Karl Begg (Australia) Jason Clements (Australia) Anthony Gilbertson	BMW M3 GTR	5	Hit Kangaroo
DNF	D	42	(Australia) Hallmark Homes	(New Zealand) Karl Begg (Australia) Jason Clements (Australia) Anthony Gilbertson	4.0 L BMW P60B40 V8	5	Hit Kangaroo
DNS	B	38	(Australia) Wall Racing	(Hong Kong) Daniel Bilski (Australia) Matt Kingsley (Australia) Paul Tresidder	Porsche 997 GT3 Cup S		Crash in Practice 2
DNS	B	38	(Australia) Wall Racing	(Hong Kong) Daniel Bilski (Australia) Matt Kingsley (Australia) Paul Tresidder	3.8 L Porsche H6		Crash in Practice 2
DNS	AP	88	(Australia) Maranello Motorsport	(United Kingdom) Ben Collins (Australia) Tony D'Alberto (Finland) Mika Salo	Ferrari 458 Italia GT3		Crash in Practice 1
DNS	AP	88	(Australia) Maranello Motorsport	(United Kingdom) Ben Collins (Australia) Tony D'Alberto (Finland) Mika Salo	4.5 L Ferrari F142 V8		Crash in Practice 1
DNS	B	69	(New Zealand) Motorsport Services	(United Kingdom) Frank Lyons (New Zealand) Phil Mauger^{1} (New Zealand) Lindsay O'Donnell^{1}	Porsche 997 GT3 Cup		Road Accident
DNS	B	69	(New Zealand) Motorsport Services	(United Kingdom) Frank Lyons (New Zealand) Phil Mauger^{1} (New Zealand) Lindsay O'Donnell^{1}	3.8 L Porsche H6		Road Accident

^1 – Scott O'Donnell, Phil Mauger, Lindsay O'Donnell & Hayden Knighton were unable to drive in the race following a car accident on the Thursday. Knighton & Scott O'Donnell were replaced by Frank Lyons (who moved from the withdrawn #69 car) and Chris van der Drift.

- Note: Class winners are shown in bold.
- Race time of winning car: 12:00:11.0280
- Fastest race lap: 2:03.3091 – Markus Winkelhock
