= Wolfgang Reip =

Belgian former racing driver (born 1986)

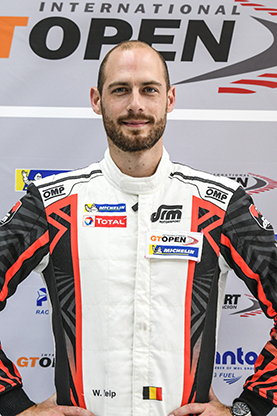
- Reip in 2018
- Nationality: (Belgium) Belgian
- Born: 1 October 1986 (age 40) Etterbeek, Belgium
- Categorisation: FIA Bronze (2013); FIA Silver (2014–2015, 2019–); FIA Gold (2016–2018)

Previous series
- 2013 2013 2014 2014 2014-2015 2015-2016 2016 2018: Dutch GT4 Cup; FIA World Endurance Championship - LMP2; Protyre Formula Renault Championship; British GT Championship - GT3; Super GT - GT300; Blancpain Endurance Series; Intercontinental GT Challenge; International GT Open

Championship titles
- 2015: Blancpain Endurance Series

Wolfgang Reip (born 1 October 1986 in Etterbeek) is a Belgian former racing driver.

== Early career ==
Racing karts from the age of six at his local indoor karting track, Reip began to develop his passion for racing and started racing in 4-stroke karting races around Belgium. Despite moving up to 2-stroke karting at 11, Reip lacked the budget to compete in races and had to wait until 2010 to get his first taste of cars, taking part in the Paris-based Pro Pulsion driving school, where he placed third at the end of the shootout.

Two years later, Reip competed in the 2012 GT Academy competition, which was a joint venture between Nissan and the developers of Gran Turismo with the goal of identifying potential racers via online racing events. Having competed in the time trials alongside 830,000 other participants, Reip advanced as one of the 36 finals to an eight day race camp at Silverstone. At the end of the race camp, Reip won the "GT Academy Race" and became the champion of the 2012 European GT Academy.

== Career ==
Making his car racing debut at the 2013 Dubai 24 Hour in the SP3 class, Reip had nowhere to go when he hit a loose wheel during his stint, which caused the car to be put into the garage for repairs mid-race.

During the rest of 2013, Reip mainly competed in both the FIA GT Series and the Blancpain Endurance Series for Team RJN. In the former, Reip scored three class podiums, two of which at the Slovakia Ring, and the third one at Navarra, on his way to fifth in the Pro-Am points. Meanwhile in the latter, Reip scored a lone class podium at the 24 Hours of Spa and finished 10th in the Pro-Am standings.

Near the end of 2013, Reip made his LMP2 debut at the 6 Hours of Bahrain for Greaves Motorsport. In his only race in prototypes, Reip came fifth overall and third in LMP2.

In 2014, Reip made his debut in the Bathurst 12 Hour and 24 Hours of Le Mans. At Bathurst, Reip was not able to finish the race as teammate Katsumasa Chiyo was involved in a crash, while at Le Mans, the Nissan ZEOD RC's gearbox failed in the first hour. Competing in British GT Championship in the second half of the year, Reip finished second in the second race at Spa.

Returning to Bathurst for 2015 alongside Alex Buncombe and Katsumasa Chiyo, they qualified third and despite a last-minute driver change, with Florian Strauss filling in for Buncombe, the trio took a historical win at the Australian enduro after Chiyo went from third to first in the last ten minutes of the race. Following his win at Bathurst, Reip returned to the Blancpain Endurance Series alongside Chiyo and Buncombe, with whom he would win at Le Castellet and take the Blancpain Endurance Series title by three points at the season-ending Nürburgring round.

Despite winning the 2015 Blancpain Endurance Series, Reip was dropped by Nissan in early 2016, and joined Bentley Team M-Sport to defend his Blancpain Endurance Series title. Scoring a lone third place finish at Monza, Reip finished third in the standings in his fourth and final season in the series.

After spending 2017 on the sidelines, Reip made a one-off appearance in the Spa round of the 2018 International GT Open. In the two races, Reip scored a best result of seventh in race one.

Having had hearing problems since 2014, Reip revealed in 2022 that he had been suffering from hyperacusis, which led to an abrupt end to his racing career four years earlier.

== Racing record ==
=== Racing career summary ===
Season	Series	Team	Races	Wins	Poles	F/Laps	Podiums	Points	Position
2013	Dutch GT4 Cup		1	0	0	0	0	0	NC
2013	Merdeka Millennium Endurance Race	Nismo Global Athlete Program	1	0	0	0	0	N/A	6th
2013	Blancpain Endurance Series – Pro-Am	Nissan GT Academy Team RJN	5	0	0	0	1	36	10th
2013	FIA GT Series – Pro-Am	Nissan GT Academy Team RJN	10	0	0	0	3	76	5th
2013	FIA World Endurance Championship – LMP2	Greaves Motorsport	1	0	0	0	1	15	21st
2014	Bathurst 12 Hour – A	Nismo Global Athlete Program	1	0	0	0	0	N/A	DNF
2014	Protyre Formula Renault Championship	Fortec Motorsports	3	0	0	0	0	41	14th
2014	VLN Series – SP9	Nissan GT Academy Team RJN	1	0	0	0	0	0	NC
2014	Blancpain Endurance Series – Pro-Am	Nissan GT Academy Team RJN	2	0	0	0	0	12	21st
2014	British GT Championship – GT3	Nissan GT Academy Team RJN	5	0	0	0	1	18	27th
2014	Super GT – GT300	NDDP Racing	1	0	0	0	0	0	NC
2015	Bathurst 12 Hour – AA	Nismo Global Athlete Program	1	1	0	0	1	N/A	**1st**
2015	Blancpain Endurance Series	Nissan GT Academy Team RJN	5	1	1	2	2	62	**1st**
2015	Renault Sport Trophy – Elite	Monlau Competición	3	0	0	0	2	45	10th
2015	Renault Sport Trophy – Endurance	Monlau Competición	2	1	0	0	1	37	8th
2015	Super GT – GT300	NDDP Racing	1	0	0	0	0	0	NC
2016	Blancpain Endurance Series	Bentley Team M-Sport	5	0	0	0	1	59	**3rd**
2016	Intercontinental GT Challenge	Bentley Team M-Sport	1	0	0	0	1	15	11th
2018	International GT Open	Aston Martin Brussels Racing	2	0	0	0	0	4	37th

=== Complete Blancpain GT Series Endurance Cup results ===
Year	Entrant	Class	Car	1	2	3	4	5	6	7	Rank	Points
2013	Nissan GT Academy Team RJN	Pro-Am	Nissan GT-R Nismo GT3	MNZ; 8	SIL; Ret	LEC; Ret	SPA; 6H; 3	SPA; 12H; 4	SPA; 24H; 3	NÜR; 8	10th	36
2014	Nissan GT Academy Team RJN	Pro-Am	Nissan GT-R Nismo GT3	MNZ	SIL	LEC	SPA; 6H; 7	SPA; 12H; 16	SPA; 24H; 12	NÜR; 6	21st	12
2015	Nissan GT Academy Team RJN	Pro	Nissan GT-R Nismo GT3	MNZ; 8	**SIL**; 13	LEC; 1	SPA; 6H; 25	SPA; 12H; 25	SPA; 24H; 15	NÜR; 3	1st	62
2016	Bentley Team M-Sport	Pro	Bentley Continental GT3	MNZ; 3	SIL; 46	LEC; 4	SPA; 6H; 5	SPA; 12H; 1	SPA; 24H; 4	NÜR; 20	3rd	59

=== Complete FIA GT Series results ===
Year	Team	Car	Class	1	2	3	4	5	6	7	8	9	10	11	12	Pos.	Points
2013	Nissan GT Academy Team RJN	Nissan GT-R Nismo GT3	Pro-Am	NOG; QR; 13	NOG; CR; 14	ZOL; QR; 15	ZOL; CR; 14	ZAN; QR; Ret	ZAN; QR; 11	SVK; QR; 12	SVK; CR; 8	NAV; QR; 11	NAV; CR; 6	BAK; QR	BAK; CR	5th	76

=== Complete FIA World Endurance Championship results ===
Year	Entrant	Class	Car	Engine	1	2	3	4	5	6	7	8	Rank	Points
2013	Greaves Motorsport	LMP2	Zytek Z11SN	Nissan VK45DE 4.5 L V8	SIL	SPA	LMS	SÃO	COA	FUJ	SHA	BHR; 3	21st	15

=== Complete Bathurst 12 Hour results ===
Year	Team	Co-Drivers	Car	Class	Laps	Pos.	Class Pos.
2014	(Japan) NISMO Athlete Global Team	(United Kingdom) Alex Buncombe (Japan) Katsumasa Chiyo	Nissan GT-R Nismo GT3	A	58	DNF	DNF
2015	(Japan) NISMO Athlete Global Team	(Japan) Katsumasa Chiyo (Germany) Florian Strauss	Nissan GT-R Nismo GT3	AA	269	**1st**	**1st**

==== Complete Protyre Formula Renault Championship results ====
(key) (Races in bold indicate pole position; races in italics indicate fastest lap)

Year	Team	1	2	3	4	5	6	7	8	9	10	11	12	13	14	15	Pos	Points
2014	Fortec Motorsports	ROC; 1; 7	ROC; 2; 6	ROC; 3; 14	DON; 1	DON; 2	DON; 3	BRH; 1	BRH; 2	SNE; 1	SNE; 2	SNE; 3	CRO; 1	CRO; 2	SIL; 1	SIL; 2	14th	41

=== Complete British GT Championship results ===
Year	Team	Car	Class	1	2	3	4	5	6	7	8	9	10	DC	Points
2014	Nissan GT Academy RJN Motorsport	Nissan GT-R Nismo GT3	GT3	OUL; 1	OUL; 2	ROC	SIL	SNE; 1; 14	SNE; 2; 16	SPA; 1; 16	SPA; 2; 2	BRH	DON; 11	27th	18

^{†} As Mardenborough was a guest driver, he was ineligible to score points.

=== Complete 24 Hours of Le Mans results ===
Year	Team	Co-Drivers	Car	Class	Laps	Pos.	Class Pos.
2014	(Japan) Nissan Motorsports Global	(Spain) Lucas Ordóñez (Japan) Satoshi Motoyama	Nissan ZEOD RC	CDNT	5	DNF	DNF

=== Complete Super GT results ===
(key) (Races in bold indicate pole position) (Races in italics indicate fastest lap)

Year	Team	Car	Class	1	2	3	4	5	6	7	8	DC	Pts
2014	NDDP Racing with B-MAX	Nissan GT-R GT3	GT300	OKA	FUJ	AUT	SUG	FUJ	SUZ; 19	BUR	MOT	NC	0
2015	NDDP Racing	Nissan GT-R NISMO GT3	GT300	OKA	FUJ	CHA	FUJ	SUZ; 14	SUG	AUT	MOT	NC	0

=== Complete International GT Open results ===
Pos.	Team	Car	Class	1	2	3	4	5	6	7	8	9	10	11	12	13	14	Pos	Points
2018	Aston Martin Brussels Racing	Aston Martin V12 Vantage GT3	Pro	EST; 1	EST; 2	LEC; 1	LEC; 2	SPA; 1; 7	SPA; 2; 17	HUN; 1	HUN; 2	SIL; 1	SIL; 2	MNZ; 1	MNZ; 2	CAT; 1	CAT; 2	37th	4
