= Katsumasa Chiyo =

Japanese racing driver (born 1986)

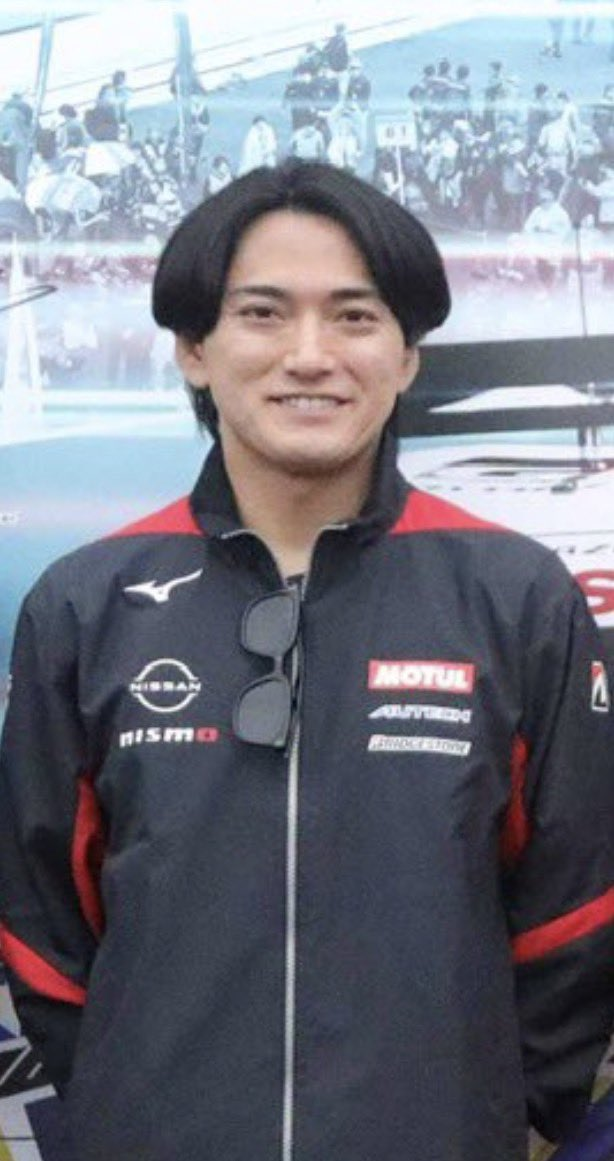
- Chiyo in 2025
- Nationality: (Japan) Japanese
- Born: 9 December 1986 (age 39) Tokyo, Japan

GT Racing career
- Current team: Nissan GT Academy Team RJN

FIA GT World Cup career
- Debut season: 2017 FIA GT World Cup
- Current team: Nissan GT Academy Team RJN
- Categorisation: FIA Silver (until 2015); FIA Gold (2016–)
- Car number: 23
- Former teams: KCMG
- Starts: 23
- Championships: 0
- Wins: 0
- Poles: 0
- Fastest laps: 2
- Best finish: 12th in 2019 FIA GT World Cup
- Finished last season: 12th

Previous series
- 2018–2019 2011–2019 2020-21 2010–2012 2008–2011 2012 2013: GT World Challenge Asia; Super Formula; All-Japan Formula Three Championship; FIA GT Championship; Deutsche Tourenwagen Masters; Various GT championships Bathurst 12 Hour

Katsumasa Chiyo (千代勝正, Chiyo Katsumasa; born 9 December 1986 in Tokyo, Japan) is a Japanese factory racing driver, currently competing in the Autobacs Super GT Series as a factory driver for Nissan. He is a graduate of the Nissan Driver Development Program (NDDP), and a past champion of the Bathurst 12 Hour race, and the GT World Challenge Europe Endurance Cup.

== Career ==
=== Early career ===
Chiyo began racing cars in 2007, competing in the Formula Challenge Japan (FCJ) series after earning a scholarship from the NDDP. He finished third in the 2008 FCJ series, before moving into the National Class of the All-Japan Formula Three Championship in 2009. Chiyo won the National Class title in 2011 with NDDP Racing, winning five races to defeat Honda prospect Tomoki Nojiri on a tie breaker.

Chiyo returned to All-Japan F3 in 2013, competing in the main class with the B-Max Racing Team. He finished third in the championship, with two victories. Chiyo took part in the 2013 Macau Grand Prix, finishing in 15th place. In 2015, Chiyo made a one off return to F3 at Fuji Speedway. In 2016, Chiyo returned to F3 to contest the full season with B-Max Racing. He won one race, and finished sixth in the championship, after missing four races over two rounds due to a back injury.

=== Super GT (2012-present) ===
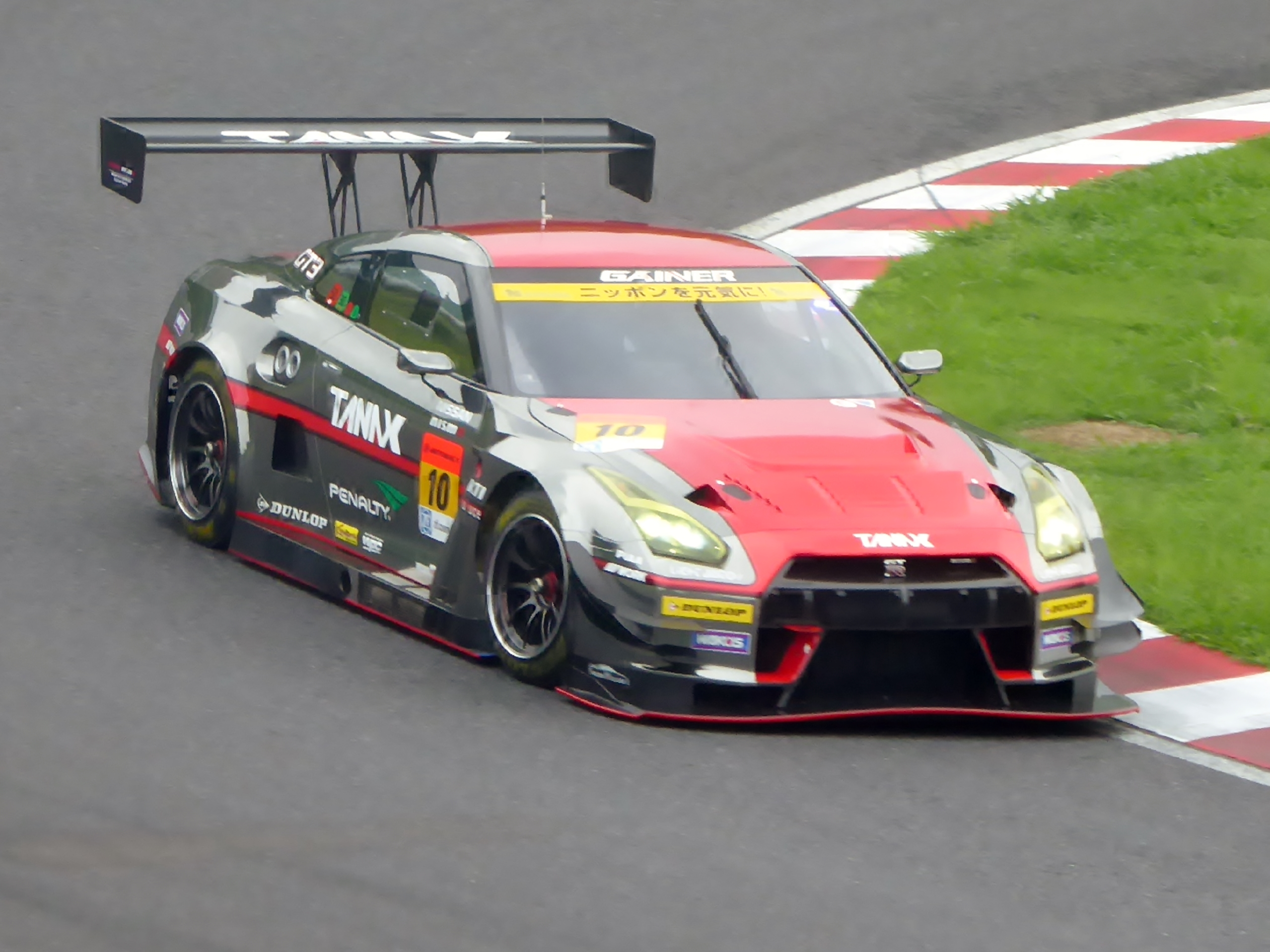
The Nissan GT-R of Chiyo, Couto and Tomita which won the GT300 class at the 2015 1000 km Suzuka.

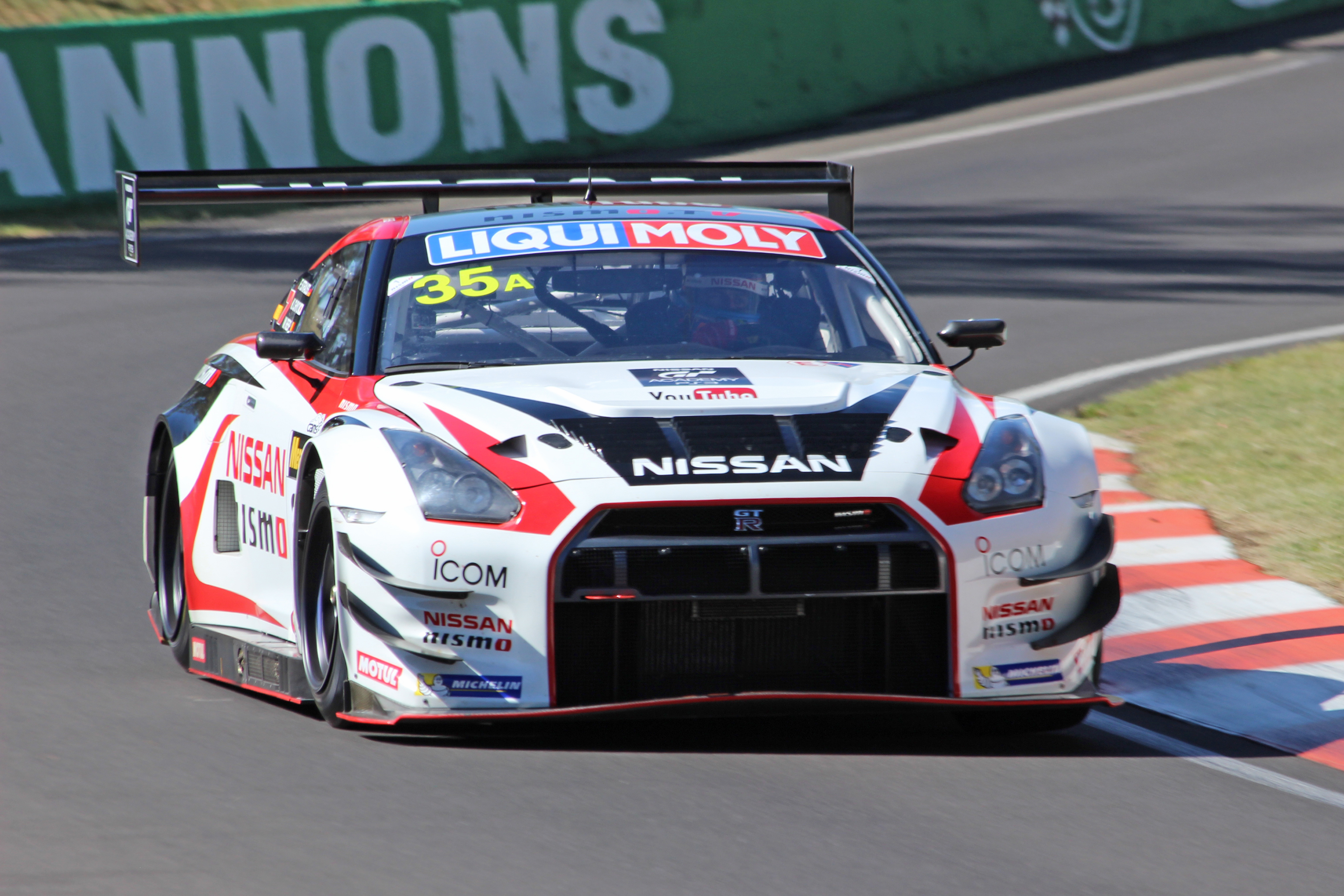
The race-winning Nissan GT-R of Chiyo, Reip and Strauss at the 2015 Liqui Moly Bathurst 12 Hour.

After winning the All-Japan F3 National Class title in 2011, Chiyo stepped up to the Autobacs Super GT Series, racing a Nissan GT-R GT3 in the GT300 class for NDDP Racing. He took his first victory at Sportsland SUGO with Yuhi Sekiguchi, and went on to finish the season in fourth place. With NDDP prospect Daiki Sasaki moving up to GT300, Chiyo moved to pro-am team Dijon Racing for the 2013 season. He finished 28th in the standings after taking just one points-scoring finish.

After missing the 2014 season due to his new commitments in Europe, Chiyo returned to Super GT in 2015, this time with Gainer in their new Nissan GT-R alongside André Couto. Chiyo and Couto won the second round of the championship, the Fuji 500km. Then in the Suzuka 1000km, Chiyo, Couto, and third driver Ryuichiro Tomita won the GT300 class, despite carrying 88 kilogrammes of Success Ballast. Chiyo finished the season second in the championship, despite missing two races due to his ongoing commitments in the GT World Challenge Europe Endurance Cup.

His performances in Japan and Europe secured a promotion to the GT500 class for the 2016 season, joining three-time GT500 champion Satoshi Motoyama at MOLA. Chiyo and Motoyama finished third at Okayama International Circuit in their first race together. Chiyo suffered a spinal injury after a crash in the summer race at Fuji, which forced him to miss over a month of competition including the Suzuka 1000km. He finished the season twelfth in the standings in 2016, and again in 2017, where Chiyo nearly took his first premier class victory at Sugo after a last-lap battle between Motoyama and Kohei Hirate.

Chiyo and Motoyama remained teammates in 2018, as MOLA were replaced in GT500 by the new NDDP Racing with B-Max team. They finished 17th in the championship that season. After the season, Chiyo was assigned to drive in the Intercontinental GT Challenge for Nissan and KC Motorgroup (KCMG), resulting in his second sabbatical from Super GT. Instead, he was appointed reserve driver for the GT500 class, and in addition to providing commentary on television programs, he accompanied the team to all rounds that did not clash with the Intercontinental GT Challenge schedule. At the sixth round of the season in Autopolis, Chiyo was called on as a last-minute replacement for James Rossiter at Calsonic Team Impul, after Rossiter was diagnosed with acute tinnitus.

Chiyo returned to full-time GT500 competition in 2020, returning to NDDP Racing with B-Max alongside Hirate. They ranked 13th in the championship in 2020, and both drivers were retained for 2021.

In 2022, Mitsunori Takaboshi, a fellow NDDP graduate, replaced Hirate at NDDP Racing alongside Chiyo, coinciding with the debut of the new Nissan Z GT500. At long last, Chiyo won for the first time as a GT500 driver when he and Takaboshi won the Suzuka GT 300km Race. It was also the first win for the new Z in GT500. Chiyo scored his second career win at Sugo in September, winning in a wet race. Chiyo and Takaboshi would finish second in the GT500 championship standings, a career-best for both drivers.

Both drivers remained at NDDP Racing for the 2023 season. Chiyo and Takaboshi were leading the Suzuka GT 450km Race on 4 June when the race was red-flagged following a severe accident involving NISMO driver Tsugio Matsuda. Because they had not made two pit stops to fulfill the sporting regulations for the event, they were dropped from first to fourth in the final classification.

=== International GT racing ===
Chiyo began racing in the Blancpain Endurance Series (now the GT World Challenge Europe Endurance Cup) in 2014, driving a Nissan GT-R Nismo GT3 for RJN Motorsport. He scored a podium finish at Circuit Paul Ricard. Along with Alex Buncombe and Wolfgang Reip, Chiyo won the 2015 series. The trio won the 1000 km Paul Ricard and finished third in the final race of the series at the Nürburgring, taking the title by three points over the Bentley M-Sport entry of Steven Kane, Andy Meyrick and Guy Smith. In doing so, Chiyo became the first Japanese driver to win a championship in a top-level sports car racing series organized by the Stéphane Ratel Organisation, and the first to win a major sports car racing championship of any kind outside of Asia.

Chiyo competed in the 2014 Bathurst 12 Hour as part of the Nismo Global Driver Exchange, driving a Nissan GT-R Nismo GT3 with Buncombe and Reip. Chiyo was involved in a crash in the early stages of the race, ending the team's chances after 58 laps. Chiyo returned to the race in 2015, this time paired with Reip and Florian Strauss. The trio won the race after Chiyo took the lead with two laps remaining. In the 2016 race, Chiyo finished a close second driving with Kelly and Strauss.

In 2017, Chiyo participated in the Blancpain Endurance Series with Alex Buncombe and Lucas Ordonez with RJN who retired the Nissan GT Academy program to run a new program with Motul forming Motul Team RJN Nissan. Chiyo, Buncombe and Ordóñez withdrew the first race after Bentley Team M-Sport's driver Guy Smith caused a severe multi-car pileup accident which involved Chiyo. The team went on to finish twenty-third in the championship talley. Chiyo returned to the sport in 2019, driving for KCMG after RJN Motorsport withdrew the Nissan marque. He was teamed with Tsugio Matsuda and Josh Burdon. Chiyo was set to debut the 2020 Bathurst 12 Hour with Burdon and Matsuda but withdrew the race after he crashed in the first practice which caused major damage to the Nissan GT-R Nismo GT3.

=== Super Formula (2018) ===
Chiyo competed for one season in the Japanese Super Formula Championship, driving for B-Max Racing Team in 2018. His best finish was tenth place at the season-ending JAF Grand Prix Suzuka.

== Racing record ==
=== Career summary ===
Season	Series	Team	Races	Wins	Poles	FLaps	Podiums	Points	Position
2007	Formula Challenge Japan	?	12	0	0	0	0	28	15th
2008	Formula Challenge Japan	NDDP	16	3	1	1	6	136	**3rd**
2009	Japanese Formula 3 Championship - National	Team Nova	16	0	0	0	5	48	6th
2010	Japanese Formula 3 Championship - National	Denso Team Le Beausset	16	1	1	1	7	66	**3rd**
2011	Japanese Formula 3 Championship - National	NDDP Racing	14	5	5	3	10	89	**1st**
2012	Super GT - GT300	NDDP Racing	8	1	0	0	2	53	4th
2013	Super GT - GT300	Dijon Racing	8	0	0	0	0	2	28th
2013	Japanese Formula 3 Championship	B-MAX Engineering	15	2	1	2	8	72	**3rd**
2013	Macau Grand Prix	B-MAX Engineering	1	0	0	0	0	N/A	15th
2014	Blancpain Endurance Series - Pro-Am	Nissan GT Academy Team RJN	5	0	0	0	1	25	12th
2014	24 Hours of Nürburgring - SP9	Nissan GT Academy Team RJN	1	0	0	0	0	N/A	DNF
2014	GT Asia Series	B-Max Racing Team	3	0	0	0	0	11	46th
2015	Super GT - GT300	Gainer	6	2	1	0	3	74	**2nd**
2015	Japanese Formula 3 Championship	B-MAX Racing Team	2	0	0	0	0	4	10th
2015	Blancpain Endurance Series - Pro	Nissan GT Academy Team RJN	5	1	0	1	2	62	**1st**
2016	Super GT - GT500	MOLA	7	0	0	0	1	23	12th
2016	Japanese Formula 3 Championship	B-MAX Racing Team with NDDP	13	1	0	2	3	34	6th
2017	Super GT - GT500	MOLA	8	0	0	0	1	29	12th
2017	Blancpain GT Series Endurance Cup	Motul Team RJN Nissan	5	0	0	0	0	12	23rd
2017	Intercontinental GT Challenge	Nissan Motorsport	1	0	0	0	0	0	NC
2017	Intercontinental GT Challenge	Motul Team RJN Nissan	1	0	0	0	0	0	NC
2018	Super GT - GT500	NDDP by B-Max Racing	8	0	0	0	0	14	17th
2018	Super Formula	B-MAX Racing Team	6	0	0	0	0	0	18th
2019	Super GT - GT500	Team Impul	1	0	0	0	0	0	NC
2019	Super GT - GT500	Nismo	Reserve Driver						
2019	Blancpain GT Series Endurance Cup	KCMG	5	0	0	0	0	0	NC
2019	Intercontinental GT Challenge	KCMG	5	0	0	2	0	8	31st
2019	24H GT Series - A6-Pro	KCMG	1	0	0	0	0	0	NC
2019	Super Taikyu - ST-TCR	Waimarama Kizuna Racing Team	5	0	0	1	2	78.5‡	5th‡
2020	Super GT - GT500	NDDP Racing with B-Max	8	0	0	0	0	29	13th
2020	Super Taikyu - ST-TCR	Waimarama Kizuna Racing Team	5	2	0	1	4	102.5‡	**2nd‡**
2021	Super GT - GT500	NDDP Racing with B-Max	8	0	0	0	1	39	10th
2021	Super Taikyu - ST-Z	Porsche Team EBI Waimarama	6	1	0	0	1	52.5‡	7th‡
2022	Super GT - GT500	NDDP Racing	8	2	0	1	2	66	**2nd**
2022	Super Taikyu - ST-Z	Porsche Team EBI Waimarama	5	0	0	2	1	80‡	5th‡
2023	Super GT - GT500	NDDP Racing	7	1	0	0	3	63	**2nd**
2023	Super Taikyu - ST-Z	Porsche Team EBI Waimarama	6	0	2	2	1	50‡	8th‡
2024	Super GT - GT500	NISMO	8	0	0	1	2	45	8th
2024	Super Taikyu - ST-Q	NISMO							
2025	Super GT - GT500	NISMO	8	1	0	1	2	49	6th
2025	Super Taikyu ST-TCR	Waimarama Racing	6	2	1	NA	5	122‡	**1st**‡
2026	Super GT - GT500	NISMO	7	0	0	0	2	37	11th
2026	Super Taikyu - ST-TCR	Waimarama Racing							

^{*} Season still in progress.

‡ Team standings.

=== Complete Super GT results ===
(key) (Races in bold indicate pole position) (Races in italics indicate fastest lap)

Year	Team	Car	Class	1	2	3	4	5	6	7	8	9	DC	Pts
2012	NDDP Racing	Nissan GT-R	GT300	OKA; 19	FUJ; 18	SEP; 4	SUG; 1	SUZ; 2	FUJ; 9	AUT; 19	MOT; 6		4th	53
2013	Dijon Racing	Nissan GT-R	GT300	OKA; 9	FUJ; 11	SEP; 13	SUG; 11	SUZ; 16	FUJ; Ret	AUT; 17	MOT; 18		28th	2
2015	GAINER	Nissan GT-R	GT300	**OKA**; 7	FUJ; 1	CHA	FUJ; 6	SUZ; 1	SUG	AUT; 2	MOT; 6		**2nd**	**74**
2016	MOLA	Nissan GT-R NISMO GT500	GT500	OKA; 3	FUJ; 7	AUT; 13	SUG; Ret	FUJ	SUZ; 12	CHA; 8	MOT; 7		12th	23
2017	MOLA	Nissan GT-R NISMO GT500	GT500	OKA; Ret	FUJ; 11	AUT; 4	SUG; 2	FUJ; 11	SUZ; 14	CHA; 10	MOT; 6		12th	29
2018	NDDP by B-Max Racing	Nissan GT-R NISMO GT500	GT500	OKA; 7	FUJ; 10	SUZ; 7	CHA; 13	FUJ; 15	SUG; 8	AUT; 13	MOT; 9		17th	14
2019	Team Impul	Nissan GT-R NISMO GT500	GT500	OKA	FUJ	SUZ	CHA	FUJ	AUT; 12	SUG	MOT		NC	0
2020	NDDP Racing with B-Max	Nissan GT-R NISMO GT500	GT500	FUJ; 7	FUJ; 8	SUZ; 6	MOT; 7	FUJ; Ret	SUZ; 4	MOT; 15	FUJ; 6		13th	29
2021	NDDP Racing with B-Max	Nissan GT-R NISMO GT500	GT500	OKA; 9	FUJ; 5	MOT; 6	SUZ; 2	SUG; Ret	AUT; 4	MOT; 14	FUJ; 8		10th	39
2022	NDDP Racing	Nissan Z NISMO GT500	GT500	OKA; 5	FUJ; 15	SUZ; 1	FUJ; 12	SUZ; 4	SUG; 1	AUT; 7	MOT; 4		2nd	66
2023	NDDP Racing	Nissan Z NISMO GT500	GT500	OKA; 2	FUJ; 5	SUZ; 4	FUJ; 1	SUZ; 12	SUG; 9	AUT; 3	**MOT**; **13**		2nd	63
2024	NISMO	Nissan Z NISMO GT500	GT500	OKA; 5	FUJ; 2	SUZ; 10	FUJ; 13	SUG; 12	AUT; 2	MOT; 9	SUZ; 8		8th	45
2025	NISMO	Nissan Z NISMO GT500	GT500	OKA; 6	FUJ; 8	SEP; 13	FS1 (11)	FS2; 9	SUZ; 1	SUG; 13	AUT; 6	MOT; 2	6th	49
2026	NISMO	Nissan Z NISMO GT500	GT500	OKA; 8	FUJ; 3	FUJ; Ret	SUZ; 4	SUG; WD	AUT; 3	MOT; 7	MOT; 11		11th	37

^{‡} Half points awarded as less than 75% of race distance was completed.
^{(Number)} Driver did not take part in this sprint race, points are still awarded for the teammate's result.
^{*} Season still in progress.

=== Complete Super Formula results ===
(key) (Races in bold indicate pole position) (Races in italics indicate fastest lap)

Year	Entrant	1	2	3	4	5	6	7	DC	Pts
2018	B-Max Racing Team	SUZ; 14	AUT; C	SUG; Ret	FUJ; 17	MOT; 19	OKA; 15	SUZ; 10	18th	0

=== Complete Intercontinental GT Challenge results ===
Year	Manufacturer	Car	1	2	3	4	Pos.	Points
2016	Nissan	Nissan GT-R Nismo GT3 (2016)	BAT; 3	SPA; 2	SEP; 1		1st	58
2017	Nissan	Nissan GT-R Nismo GT3 (2017)	BAT; Ret	SPA; 4	LAG; DNS		10th	12
2018	Nissan	Nissan GT-R Nismo GT3 (2018)	BAT; 5	SPA; Ret	SUZ; 10	LAG	19th	12

^{*} Season still in progress.

=== Complete Bathurst 12 Hour results ===
Year	Team	Co-Drivers	Car	Class	Laps	Pos.	Class Pos.
2014	(Japan) NISMO Athlete Global Team	(United Kingdom) Alex Buncombe (Belgium) Wolfgang Reip	Nissan GT-R Nismo GT3	A	58	DNF	DNF
2015	(Japan) NISMO Athlete Global Team	(Belgium) Wolfgang Reip (Germany) Florian Strauss	Nissan GT-R Nismo GT3	AA	269	1st	1st
2016	(Japan) NISMO Athlete Global Team	(Australia) Rick Kelly (Germany) Florian Strauss	Nissan GT-R Nismo GT3	AP	297	2nd	2nd
2017	(Japan) Nissan Motorsport	(United Kingdom) Alex Buncombe (Australia) Michael Caruso	Nissan GT-R Nismo GT3	APP	174	32nd	8th
2019	(Hong Kong) KCMG	(Australia) Josh Burdon (Japan) Tsugio Matsuda	Nissan GT-R Nismo GT3	APP	301	15th	10th

Sporting positions
Preceded by Peter Edwards; John Bowe; Craig Lowndes; Mika Salo	Winner of the Bathurst 12 Hour; 2015 (with Wolfgang Reip & Florian Strauss)	Succeeded by Álvaro Parente; Shane van Gisbergen; Jonathon Webb
Preceded by Laurens Vanthoor	Blancpain Endurance Series; Champion; 2015 with: Alex Buncombe; Wolfgang Reip	Succeeded by Incumbent
