= Nismo Global Driver Exchange =

Initiative from Nissan and Nismo

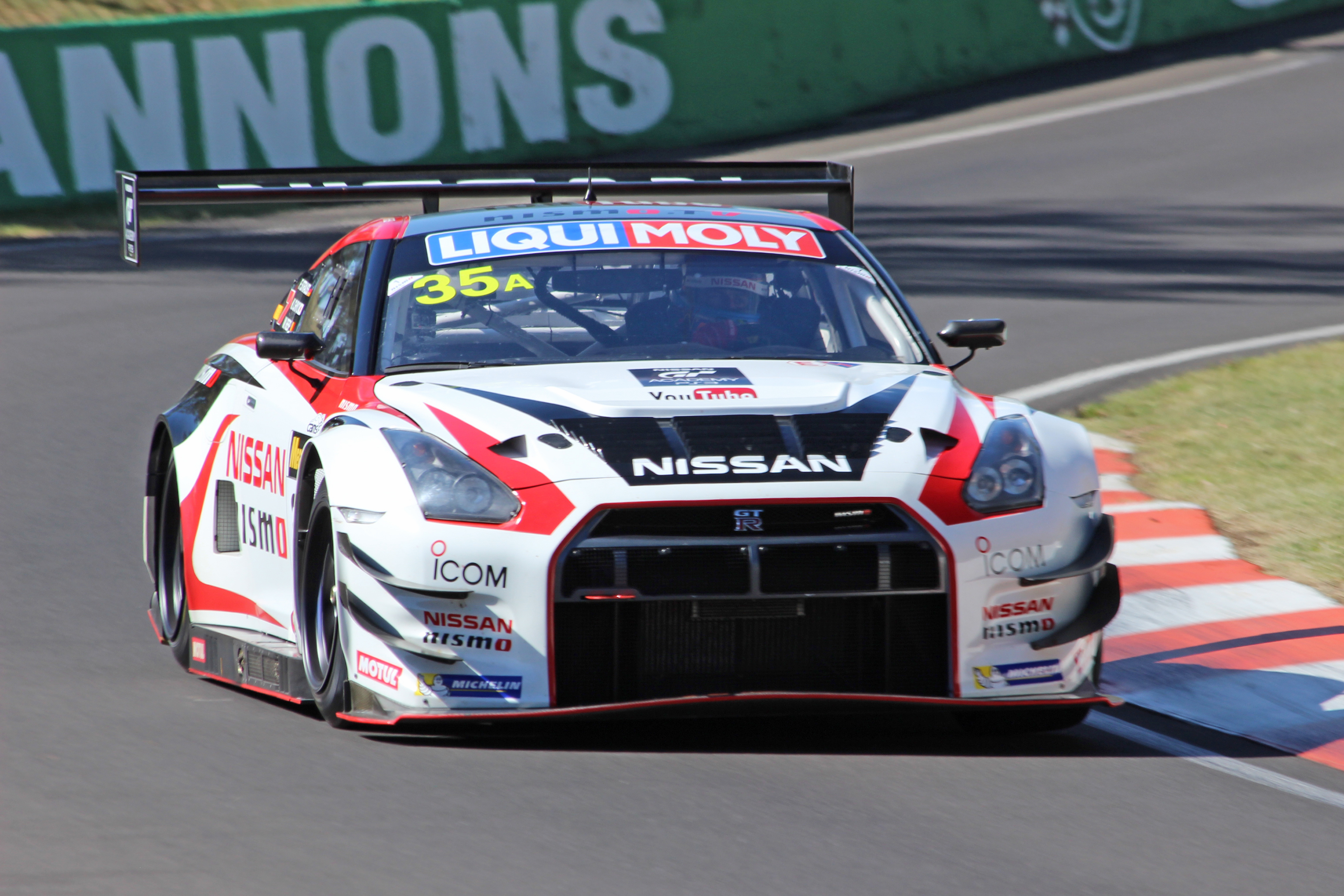
The race-winning Nissan GT-R of Katsumasa Chiyo, Wolfgang Reip and Florian Strauss at the 2015 Bathurst 12 Hour.

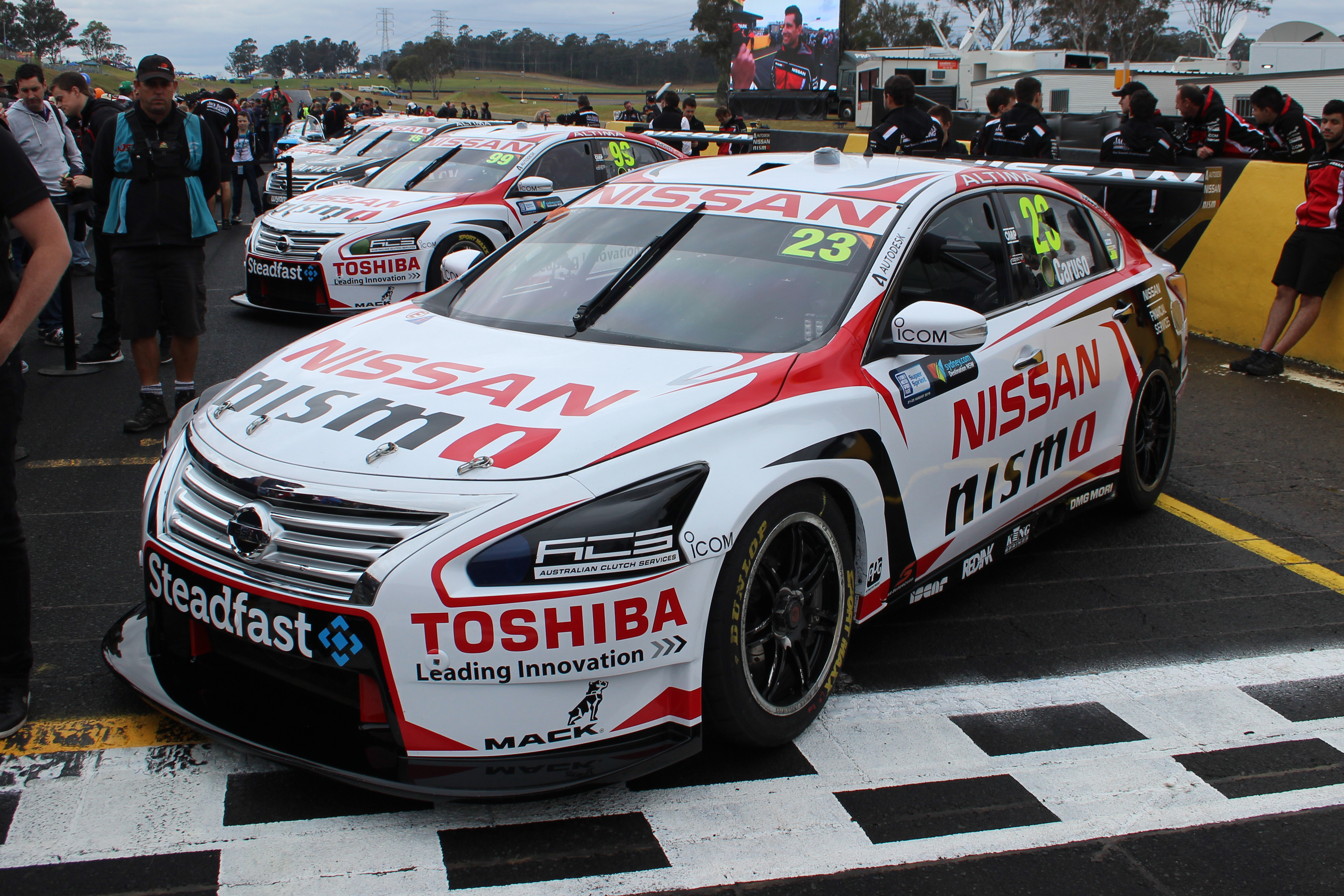
Nissan Altimas from the International V8 Supercars Championship.

The Nismo Global Driver Exchange (also known as the Nismo Global Athlete Program) was an initiative from Nissan and Nismo to share driving experience from various motor racing categories around the world.

The program was launched in February 2013 and consisted of drivers racing in the All-Japan Formula Three Championship, Blancpain Endurance Series, FIA World Endurance Championship, GP3 Series, Super GT and V8 Supercars. Drivers from the program have also raced Nissan cars in various endurance races, including the 24 Hours of Le Mans, Dubai 24 Hour, 24 Hours Nürburgring, Spa 24 Hours, Bathurst 12 Hour and the Sepang 12 Hours. Examples of driver exchanges include Michael Krumm and Lucas Ordóñez testing a V8 Supercar in 2013 and James Moffat racing in the 2014 Dubai 24 Hour.

In February 2015, Katsumasa Chiyo, Wolfgang Reip and Florian Strauss drove their Nissan GT-R Nismo GT3 to victory in the 2015 Liqui Moly Bathurst 12 Hour, after Chiyo took the lead with four minutes remaining. Chiyo and Reip also won the 2015 Blancpain Endurance Series along with Alex Buncombe.

== Former drivers ==
Driver	Series
(Saudi Arabia) Ahmed Bin Khanen	Jaguar I-Pace eTrophy
(United Kingdom) Alex Buncombe	GT World Challenge Europe Endurance Cup
(Japan) Katsumasa Chiyo	GT World Challenge Europe Endurance Cup
(Portugal) Miguel Faísca	GT World Challenge Europe Endurance Cup
(United States) Nicolas Hammann	Nissan Micra Cup
(Germany) Michael Krumm	Super GT
(United Kingdom) Jann Mardenborough	GP3 Series, FIA World Endurance Championship
(Japan) Tsugio Matsuda	Super GT, FIA World Endurance Championship
(United States) Nick McMillen	GT World Challenge Europe Endurance Cup
(Japan) Satoshi Motoyama	Super GT
(Spain) Lucas Ordóñez	All-Japan Formula Three Championship, Super GT
(France) Gaëtan Paletou	GT World Challenge Europe Endurance Cup
(Mexico) Ricardo Sanchez	GT World Challenge Europe Endurance Cup
(Russia) Mark Shulzhitskiy	GT World Challenge Europe Endurance Cup
(Australia) Matthew Simmons	GT World Challenge Europe Endurance Cup

– denotes a driver who came through the Gran Turismo Academy program.
