= Darren Cox =

British businessman and automotive (born 1974)

- Born: Darren Paul Cox; 1974 (age 51–52); Newmarket, Suffolk, England,
- Education: Royal Holloway, University of London
- Occupation: Businessman
- Organizations: Renault; Nissan
- Known for: Developing the GT Academy

Darren Paul Cox (born 1974) is a British businessman and automotive and motorsport executive who is known as the creator and director of GT Academy. A character based on Cox is portrayed by Orlando Bloom in the film Gran Turismo.

Cox is currently serving as the chief executive officer (CEO) of The Race Media after co-founding the business in 2020.

== Early life and education ==
Born in Newmarket, Suffolk, England in 1974, Cox attended the Royal Holloway, University of London and graduated with a bachelor's degree in modern history, economic history, and politics. His father worked in automotive industry, including as a stunt driver in television ads.

== Career ==
Cox started his career with Renault in the United Kingdom (UK), and after 10 years joined its sister marque, Nissan. Two years later, he joined Nissan Europe.

In 2005, Cox, as a general manager of Nissan Europe, introduced an idea of establishing an academy that would help PlayStation racing gamers become professional racing drivers. His idea was implemented in 2008 when Nissan GT Academy was founded as a joint venture between Sony and Nissan and was named after Gran Turismo game. The 23 graduates include Jann Mardenborough and Lucas Ordóñez, who both achieved podiums in the 24 Hours of Le Mans after receiving training from the academy. Cox spent nearly a decade working for Nissan in Paris and Geneva creating and leading several projects, including GT Academy, GT-R Launch, Juke, and Qashqai.

Due to his success in Europe overseeing motorsport as part of larger roles, Cox was promoted to Global Head of Motorsport and later took on an additional role as global head of sales, marketing, and brand for NISMO in 2012.

In October 2015, Cox left Nissan. During his tenure he instigated and led projects such as GT Academy, Nissan Deltawing, Nissan ZEOD electric Le Mans record, Juke R prototype, LMP2 and LMP3 engine programmes, and the Nissan LMP1 programme. After his departure, Nissan abandoned GT Academy and closed down the Le Mans and WEC race programmes.

In 2016, he founded the first professional esports racing team, eSPORTS+CARS.

His notable achievements as a race driver includes winning the Silverstone 24 hours overall in 2015 as well as a class win in the same event in 2014. He has also returned to racing in classic Minis in the Mini Seven Racing Club national series.

Gran Turismo the film, was produced by Columbia Pictures. The film was released in August 2023. The character Danny Moore, portrayed by Orlando Bloom, is based on Cox.

== Filmography ==
- Le Mans: Racing Is Everything (2017)
