= RJN Motorsport =

British motorsport team

(United Kingdom) RJN Motorsport
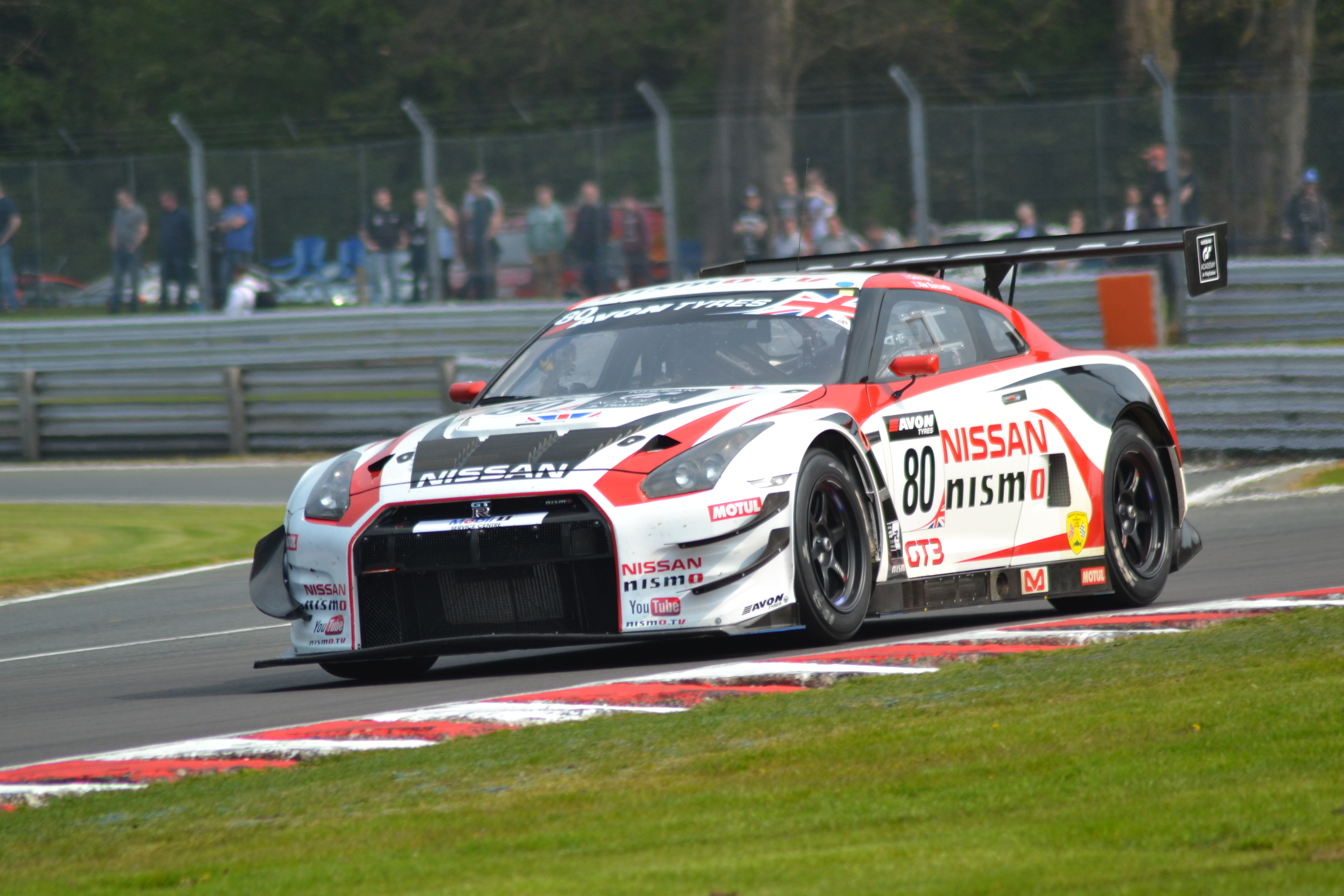
- Founded: 1999
- Team principal(s): Robert James Neville
- Current series: GT World Challenge Europe Endurance Cup; FIA World Endurance Championship; GT World Challenge Europe
- Former series: European Super Touring Championship; European Touring Car Championship; FIA GT Championship; FIA GT1 World Championship; GT4 European Series; British GT Championship; Blancpain GT Series; Dakar Rally
- Current drivers: (United Kingdom) Alex Buncombe (Germany) Ben Dörr
- Teams' Championships: 2009 GT4 European Cup
- Drivers' Championships: 2009 GT4 European Cup
- Website: https://www.teamrjn.com/

RJN Motorsport is a British sports car racing team. The team was founded by Bob Neville in 1999 who is still the team principal and has successfully competed internationally in Touring Cars, GT Racing, Dakar Rally Raid and Extreme E. Named after their founder's initials (Robert James Neville) RJN Motorsport are based in Didcot, Oxfordshire. The team was created after Nissan Motorsports Europe closed their Didcot facility and Bob who was Nissan's team principal decided to create his own motorsports outfit. RJN Motorsports have enjoyed a close and lengthy partnership with Nissan since their inception which lasted until the end of 2018 and have raced Nissans in Blancpain GT Series, FIA World Endurance Championship, 24 Hours of Le Mans, Dakar Rally and British GT Championship among other racing series.

== History ==
Bob Neville began his career in motorsports after completing his engineering apprenticeship at MG in Abingdon, when he was promoted to the racing and competitions department and subsequently the development department. After running his own company in the 1980s and early 1990s Bob moved into a position at Nissan Motorsports Europe based in Didcot until Nissan closed the facility in 1999. After this Bob decided to start his own team building and preparing cars to race themselves.

Some of RJN's earliest success came in the 2001 European Super Touring Championship where the team achieved fourth place in the teams championship of the super production class. From 2002-2004 RJN Motorsports was incorporated into Nissan's rally raid team, competing in the Paris-Dakar Rally with drivers such as Colin McRae and Ari Vatanen. After Nissan decided to pull out of rallying ahead of the 2005 season RJN was tasked with developing the Nissan 350Z for racing in the GT2 category of the British GT Championship. RJN enjoyed some success with the 350Z during the 2005 season, achieving a third place finish at Silverstone.

From 2008 RJN Motorsport was heavily involved with Nissan's GT Academy programme, provided skilled Gran Turismo players an opportunity to earn a real-life professional racing career with Nissan. This helped give rise to the career of notable racing drivers such as Lucas Ordóñez and Jann Mardenborough.

During the 2010s RJN Motorsport raced the Nissan GT-R Nismo GT3 on behalf on Nissan in various racing series across Europe including Blancpain GT Series, British GT Championship and FIA GT Championship.

Ahead of the 2019 Season RJN Motorsport agreed a partnership with 2009 Formula 1 World Champion Jenson Button to run a Honda NSX GT3 Evo in the 2019 Blancpain GT Series Endurance Cup under the team name Jenson Team Rocket RJN. In 2020 they returned to British GT for the first time since 2018 this time racing a McLaren 720S GT3. For the 2021 season a McLaren 570S GT4 was added to the team. In 2022 Jenson Team Rocket RJN continued in British GT with a Mclaren 720S GT3 entry.

In 2023 the team undertook no racing activities as they were involved with the production of the Gran Turismo feature film before they returned for another season of racing with McLaren in 2024 in British GT and at the Spa 24 Hours.
