= Mark Shulzhitskiy =

Russian racing driver (born 1989)

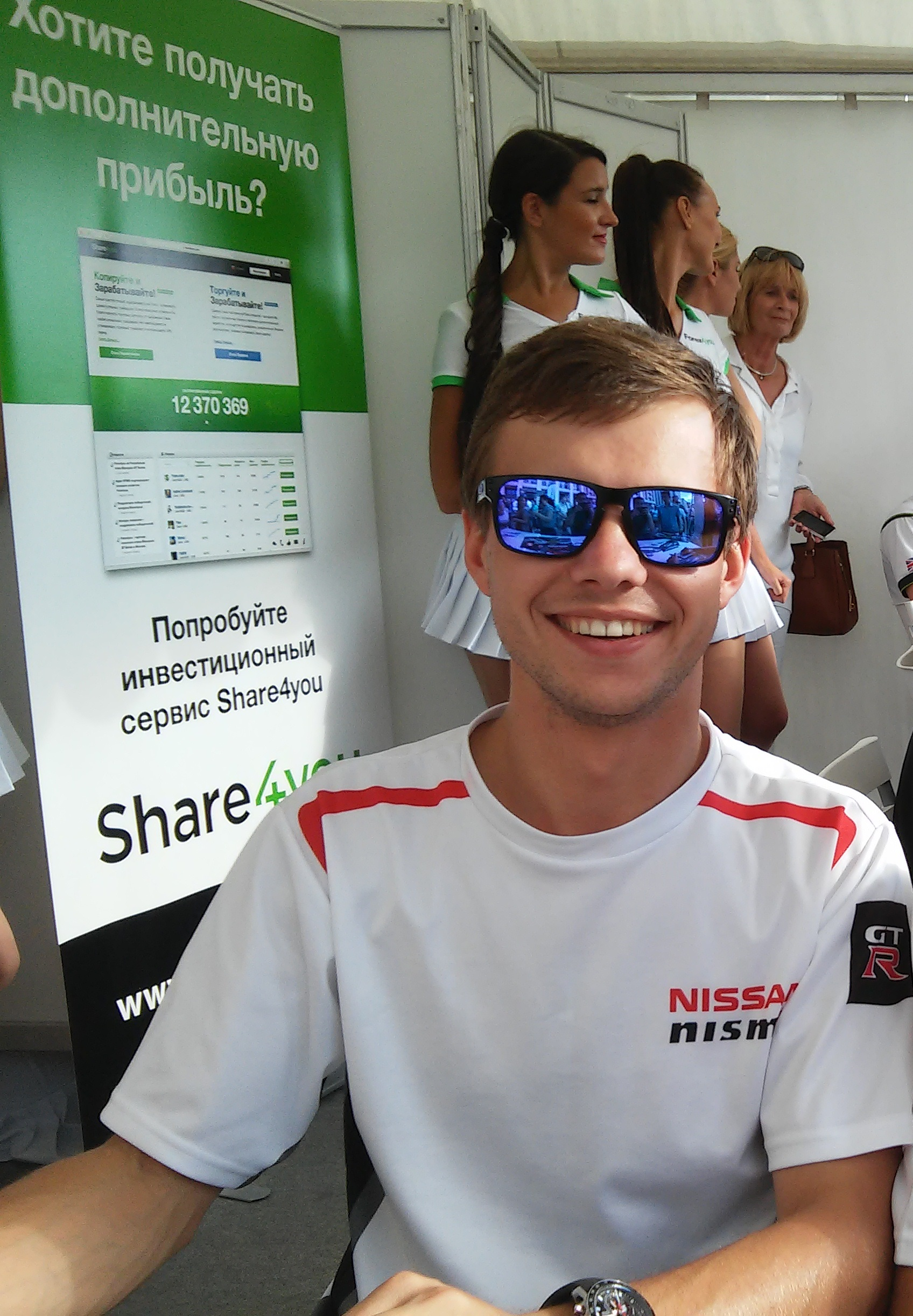
- Shulzhitskiy in 2015
- Nationality: (Russia) Russian
- Born: Mark Olegovich Shulzhitskiy; 11 July 1989 (age 37) Vladivostok, Russian SFSR, Soviet Union

Blancpain Endurance Series career
- Debut season: 2013
- Current team: Nissan GT Academy Team RJN
- Categorisation: FIA Bronze (2013); FIA Silver (2014–2015); FIA Gold (2016–)
- Car number: 32
- Starts: 5
- Wins: 0
- Poles: 0
- Fastest laps: 0
- Best finish: 18th in 2013

Previous series
- 2013: FIA GT Series

Mark Olegovich Shulzhitskiy (Russian: Марк Оле́гович Шульжи́цкий, IPA: [ˈmark ɐˈlʲeɡəvʲɪtɕ ʂʊlˈʐɨtskʲɪj]; born 11 July 1989) is a Russian racing driver, who entered professional racing by winning a spot in a PlayStation 3 GT Academy competition.

== Career ==
=== GT Academy ===
Born in Vladivostok, Shulzhitskiy's racing career began in karting, but stalled at the age of sixteen, as there were no major racing circuits within the local area. After graduating from Far Eastern Federal University in 2011 with a degree in oriental studies, Shulzhitskiy became Nissan PlayStation GT Academy champion for Russia, winning the competition at Silverstone in 2012. In order to acquire an international race licence, Shulzhitskiy and the three other regional winners – Peter Pyzera, Steve Doherty and Wolfgang Reip – were put through a three-month driver training programme, including race events in the United Kingdom, in order to compete in the Dubai 24 Hour race in January 2013. With the assistance of Roman Rusinov and Lucas Ordóñez – as well as Doherty and Reip – Shulzhitskiy was able to finish the race in 21st overall, and second in the SP3 class.

=== Blancpain Endurance Series and FIA GT Series ===
After his appearance in Dubai, Shulzhitskiy began competing in both the Blancpain Endurance Series and the FIA GT Series with Nissan GT Academy Team RJN. He scored his first class podium in the Blancpain Endurance Series at Le Castellet.

=== FIA World Endurance Championship ===
In 2013, Shulzitskiy made his prototype endurance racing début, competing in the FIA World Endurance Championship with Greaves Motorsport.

== Racing record ==
=== Career summary ===
Season	Series	Team	Races	Wins	Poles	F/Laps	Podiums	Points	Position
2012	Britcar Endurance Championship - Class 4I	Nissan GT Academy Team RJN	1	0	0	0	0	0	NC
2013	Blancpain Endurance Series - Pro-Am	Nissan GT Academy Team RJN	5	0	0	0	1	24	18th
2013	FIA GT Series - Pro-Am	Nissan GT Academy Team RJN	6	0	0	0	0	35	12th
2013	FIA World Endurance Championship - LMP2	Greaves Motorsport	1	0	0	0	0	10	24th
2014	Blancpain Endurance Series - Pro-Am	Nissan GT Academy Team RJN	2	0	0	0	0	0	NC
2014	European Le Mans Series - LMP2	Greaves Motorsport	3	0	0	0	0	22	13th
2014	24 Hours of Le Mans - LMP2	OAK Racing	1	0	0	0	0	N/A	5th
2015	Blancpain Endurance Series - Pro-Am	Nissan GT Academy Team RJN	1	0	1	0	0	0	NC
2015	Blancpain GT Sprint Series - Pro-Am	Nissan GT Academy Team RJN	2	0	0	0	1	15	9th
2015	European Le Mans Series - LMP3	Lanan Racing	1	0	0	0	1	30	8th
2015	European Le Mans Series - LMP3	Team LNT	1	0	0	0	1	30	8th
2015	FIA World Endurance Championship	Nissan Motorsports	1	0	0	0	0	0	34th
2015	24 Hours of Le Mans - LMP1	Nissan Motorsports	1	0	0	0	0	N/A	DNF
2016	24 Hours of Nürburgring - SP8T	Schulze Motorsport	1	0	?	?	0	N/A	DNF

=== 24 Hours of Le Mans results ===
Year	Team	Co-Drivers	Car	Class	Laps	Pos.	Class Pos.
2014	(France) OAK Racing	(United Kingdom) Alex Brundle (United Kingdom) Jann Mardenborough	Ligier JS P2-Nissan	LMP2	354	9th	5th
2015	(Japan) Nissan Motorsports	(Japan) Tsugio Matsuda (Spain) Lucas Ordóñez	Nissan GT-R LM Nismo	LMP1	115	DNF	DNF
