= Gran Turismo (film) =

2023 film by Neill Blomkamp

- Theatrical release poster
- Directed by: Neill Blomkamp
- Screenplay by: Jason Hall; Zach Baylin
- Story by: Jason Hall; Alex Tse
- Based on: Gran Turismo by Polyphony Digital
- Produced by: Doug Belgrad; Asad Qizilbash; Carter Swan; Dana Brunetti
- Starring: David Harbour; Orlando Bloom; Archie Madekwe; Darren Barnet; Geri Halliwell Horner; Djimon Hounsou
- Cinematography: Jacques Jouffret
- Edited by: Colby Parker Jr.; Austyn Daines
- Music by: Lorne Balfe; Andrew Kawczynski
- Production companies: Columbia Pictures; PlayStation Productions; 2.0 Entertainment
- Distributed by: Sony Pictures Releasing
- Release dates: July 30, 2023 (Circuit de Spa-Francorchamps); August 25, 2023 (United States)
- Running time: 134 minutes
- Countries: United States; Japan
- Language: English
- Budget: $60 million
- Box office: $122 million

Gran Turismo (Note: Later marketed as Gran Turismo: Based on a True Story) is a 2023 biographical sports drama film based on the sim racing video game series developed by Polyphony Digital. Produced by Columbia Pictures, PlayStation Productions, and 2.0 Entertainment, the film was directed by Neill Blomkamp from a screenplay by Jason Hall and Zach Baylin. It depicts a sensationalized account of real life British driver Jann Mardenborough, a teenage Gran Turismo player who became a professional racing car driver. Archie Madekwe stars as Mardenborough, alongside David Harbour, Orlando Bloom, Darren Barnet, Geri Halliwell Horner, and Djimon Hounsou.

Development of a film based on Gran Turismo was revealed in July 2013, with Michael De Luca and Dana Brunetti producing and Alex Tse writing the script. Joseph Kosinski was set to direct the film in June 2015 from a new screenplay by Jon and Erich Hoeber, but the Kosinski version was no longer moving forward as of February 2018. In May 2022, it was announced the film was again in development, with Blomkamp attached in June to direct. The main cast were announced in September 2022, with other cast signed in November. Filming began in Hungary that month and wrapped in December. The score was composed by Lorne Balfe and Andrew Kawczynski.

Gran Turismo premiered at the Circuit de Spa-Francorchamps in Belgium on July 30, 2023, and was released in the United States on August 25 by Columbia Pictures via Sony Pictures Releasing. It has grossed $122 million worldwide against its $60 million budget and received mixed reviews from critics, who praised Blomkamp's direction and racing sequences, but criticized its writing and use of Mardenborough's crash at the Nürburgring Nordschleife as a narrative element.

The film was nominated for "Best Adaptation" at The Game Awards 2023.

== Plot ==
Following a pitch by marketing executive Danny Moore, Nissan establishes the GT Academy to recruit skilled players of the racing simulator Gran Turismo and transform them into real racing drivers. Danny enlists former driver-turned-mechanic Jack Salter to train the players. Initially reluctant, Jack accepts after growing tired of the arrogance of his team's driver, Nicholas Capa. Meanwhile, Jann Mardenborough, a teenage gamer from Cardiff, dreams of becoming a racing driver despite his father Steve's disapproval.

Jann learns he is eligible for the GT Academy after setting a time record. The night before his race, Jann and his brother Coby attend a party, where Jann sees Audrey, his crush. However, the police arrive, the party breaks up, and as they are driving away, the police pull the two cars of parties over. As the police start talking to the people in the other car, Jann decides not to get taken in by the police, and drives off, leading the police on a chase, and finally getting away. Upon arriving home, Jann & Coby's dad is waiting outside, and Jann tells Coby he'll take the fall. As punishment, Jann is taken to his father's workplace but leaves early to participate in the qualifying race, which he wins, securing a spot in the GT Academy.

At the academy camp, Jack subjects the competitors to various tests, narrowing them down from ten to five. Jann impresses Jack by correctly diagnosing a wreck caused by glazed brakes. The final five compete in a race to determine who will represent Nissan. Jann narrowly wins against American competitor Matty Davis, but Danny prefers Matty for his commercial appeal. Jack insists on selecting Jann, who ultimately becomes the representative.

Jann is informed that finishing at least fourth in any qualifying race will earn him a professional license and a contract with Nissan. In his first professional race in Austria, he finishes last after being spun by Capa. Despite improving over subsequent races, he fails to finish the penultimate race in Spain. In Dubai, during his final qualifying race, Capa crashes, and despite debris damage, Jann finishes fourth, earning his license. He travels to Tokyo with Danny and Jack to sign his contract and uses his bonus to fly Audrey to Tokyo, starting a relationship.

Jann's first race post-signing is at the Nürburgring Nordschleife. He maintains a high position until his car lifts at the Flugplatz corner, crashes, and kills a spectator. Horrified, Jann is reluctant to race again and blames himself for the spectator's death. Jack, who experienced a similar accident at the 24 Hours of Le Mans, encourages Jann to return. An inquiry clears Jann, but professional sentiment turns against sim drivers. Danny decides a sim driver team must compete at Le Mans and finish on the podium to prove their worth.

Danny recruits Matty and fellow GT Academy participant Antonio Cruz to join Jann. On race day, Jann's father apologizes for not supporting him. Shaken by Frederik Schulin's crash, Jann is motivated by Jack playing his training music. Matty and Antonio complete their shifts, but Antonio is brought in early due to cramps. A dropped wheel nut during a pit stop causes Jann to lose positions. Using racing lines learned from the video game, he regains his position, breaking the lap record. On the final lap, Jann narrowly beats Capa, securing third place and a podium finish for Nissan.

An epilogue shows the real Jann Mardenborough, having competed in over 200 races and serving as his own stunt double in the film.

== Cast ==
- Archie Madekwe as Jann Mardenborough, a young retail worker and a fan of the Gran Turismo video games aspiring to become a professional racer.
  - Jann Mardenborough also portrays himself, serving as Madekwe's stunt double.
- David Harbour as Jack Salter, a former professional racer turned mechanic who becomes Jann's trainer for the GT Academy.
- Orlando Bloom as Danny Moore, a marketing executive at Nissan.
- Takehiro Hira as Kazunori Yamauchi, the creator of Gran Turismo.
  - The real Yamauchi cameos as a sushi chef in Tokyo.
- Darren Barnet as Matty Davis, a top American GT Academy driver and Jann's rival, later friend and co-driver for Jann at Le Mans.
- Geri Halliwell-Horner as Lesley Mardenborough, Jann's mother.
- Djimon Hounsou as Steve Mardenborough, a former footballer turned miner and Jann's father.
- Josha Stradowski as Nicholas Capa, a hot-headed and underhanded Dutch racing driver who rivals Jann and drives for Team CAPA. He is the main antagonist in the film. He is based on and named after Williams F1 driver Nicholas Latifi.
- Daniel Puig as Coby Mardenborough, Jann's brother.
- Maeve Courtier-Lilley as Audrey, Jann's love interest.
- Pepe Barroso as Antonio Cruz, a Spanish GT Academy student driver, one of Jann's friends and later co-driver for Jann at Le Mans. Loosely based on Lucas Ordóñez.
- Emelia Hartford as Leah Vega, an American female GT Academy student driver and race candidate.
- Sang Heon Lee as Joo-Hwan Lee, a Korean GT Academy student driver and race candidate.
- Max Mundt as Klaus Hoffman, a German GT Academy student driver and race candidate.
- Mariano González as Henry Evas, an Argentinian GT Academy student driver and race candidate.
- Harki Bhambra as Avi Bhatt, a British-Indian GT Academy driver and race candidate.
- Lindsay Pattison as Chloe McCormick, a British female GT Academy student driver and race candidate.
- Théo Christine as Marcel Durand, a French GT Academy student driver and race candidate.
- Niall McShea as Frederik Schulin, a professional German racing driver and second rival of Jann who drives for Audi.
- Jamie Kenna as Jack Man Jones, Jann's pit crew member.
- Thomas Kretschmann as Patrice Capa, Nicholas' father who is the founder and owner of Team CAPA.
- Richard Cambridge as Felix, a mechanic
- Nikhil Parmar as Persol, one of Jann's friends from the video game arcade where Jann would race.

== Production ==
=== Development ===
In July 2013, it was announced that Sony Pictures was developing a Gran Turismo film with Michael De Luca and Dana Brunetti producing it and a script by Alex Tse. In 2015, Joseph Kosinski was set to direct the film, with a new screenplay by Jon and Erich Hoeber. By 2018, the Kosinski version was no longer moving forward.

In May 2022, it was announced that a film adaptation of Polyphony Digital's Gran Turismo video games was in early development at Sony Pictures and PlayStation Productions. Shortly afterward, Neill Blomkamp was hired to direct a screenplay written by Jason Hall, and Sony set a release date of August 11, 2023. The lead roles were cast in September 2022 with David Harbour as a veteran race car driver who mentors Archie Madekwe as the teenage trainee, with the film being confirmed to also be a biographical film based on the story of Jann Mardenborough. Orlando Bloom was cast as a motorsport marketing executive and Darren Barnet as a threatened GT Academy racer. Additional cast additions were announced while filming in November included Djimon Hounsou, Geri Halliwell-Horner, Daniel Puig, Josha Stradowski, Thomas Kretschmann, Maeve Courtier-Lilley, Emelia Hartford, Pepe Barroso, and Sang Heon Lee. Max Mundt, Mariano González, Harki Bhambra, Lindsay Pattison, Théo Christine, and Nikhil Parmar were added to the cast in December 2022.

=== Filming ===
Filming began in Hungary in November, and wrapped in December 2022, with Jacques Jouffret serving as cinematographer. Jouffret took advantage of the Rialto extension/detachment system of Sony Venice 2 cameras in order to place sensors in tight locations of cars, away from the main camera body. Jann Mardenborough himself is a co-producer on the film and served as the racing stunt double for Madekwe, who portrayed him.

=== Music ===
In September 2022, it was reported that Stephen Barton would compose the score for the film. But on April 24, 2023, Lorne Balfe was announced to take over by scoring the film instead. The soundtrack album, also composed by Andrew Kawczynski, was released on August 11, 2023, the same day as the limited theatrical release.

== Release ==
Gran Turismo premiered at the Circuit de Spa-Francorchamps on July 30, 2023, following the Formula One 2023 Belgian Grand Prix. Gran Turismo held several preview screenings beginning on August 11, 2023, before being released in the United States on August 25, by Sony Pictures Releasing. It was originally scheduled for a wide release on August 11, but plans changed due to the SAG-AFTRA strike. Despite the delay in the United States, the film's release date remains unchanged in various international markets such as the United Kingdom, where the film was released on August 9, 2023.

An update to Gran Turismo 7 added a livery for the 2018 Nissan GT-R NISMO GT3 that was inspired by the film, and was given for free to all players who watched the movie trailer in-game.

Gran Turismo was released on digital platforms on September 26, 2023 and, in selected markets, was one of the first early-access titles on the Sony Pictures Core platform; it was later released on Blu-ray and DVD on November 7.

== Reception ==
=== Box office ===
Gran Turismo has grossed $44.4 million in the United States and Canada, and $77.7 million in other territories, for a worldwide total of $122.1 million.

In the United States and Canada, Gran Turismo was released alongside The Hill, Retribution, and Golda, and was projected to gross $12–15 million from 3,856 theaters in its opening weekend. The film made $8.5 million on its first day, including $5.3 million from several preview screenings in the weeks leading up to its release. It went on to debut to $17.4 million, finishing first at the box office, though Warner Bros. claimed its holdover Barbie actually won the weekend with $15.1 million, disputing Sony's inclusion of the $5.3 million from weeks of previews; other studios and trade publications sided with Sony, noting lumping preview screenings into opening day figures is standard practice, though typically limited to a single day of previews. The film made $6.6 million in its second weekend (a drop of 64%) and finishing fourth, then grossed $3.5 million in its third weekend.

=== Critical response ===
The film received mixed reviews. (Note: Multiple references:) On the review aggregator website Rotten Tomatoes, 65% of 225 critics' reviews are positive, with an average rating of 6.1/10. The website's consensus reads: "Gran Turismo's brisk action and feel-good underdog drama are undermined by its loose telling of the fact-based story, but this is still a generally solid racing movie." Metacritic, which uses a weighted average, assigned the film a score of 48 out of 100, based on 47 critics, indicating "mixed or average" reviews. Audiences surveyed by CinemaScore gave the film an average grade of "A" on an A+ to F scale, while those polled at PostTrak gave it a 90% overall positive score.

The racing sequences and Blomkamp's direction, especially during the climactic 24-hour race in France, were praised by most critics, who noted that, while transitioning from its video game origins to a standard race car film, Gran Turismo also serves as a cautionary example of adapting source material that may not align with a cohesive narrative. Owen Gleiberman of Variety said of the film: "There's an innocence to this one, and a surprise authenticity," commenting, "It's like a Fast and Furious movie made without cynicism, and it gets to you", finding the climax "satisfying". Kristen Lopez of TheWrap said: "Gran Turismo works best because it eschews its video game origins quickly before settling into a standard race car film. It's unknown how fans of the game will respond to the movie — no one watching the movie in this critic's theater pointed out any specific game Easter eggs — but on the whole fans of racecar films should be in for a good time."

Conversely, Ryan Gilbey's negative review for the Guardian called the film "a simulation of cinema, with scarcely a human fingerprint anywhere on its chassis." Tim Robey of the Telegraph called the film "a purringly complacent insult to a great video-game". Oli Welsh of Polygon gave the film a negative review, saying that "Gran Turismo could have used this inspiring true story to show how video games open up possibilities and remove barriers in the real world. Instead, it just uses it to score points."

=== Accolades ===
The film was nominated for "Best Adaptation" at The Game Awards 2023.

=== Criticism of crash depiction ===
The film was widely criticized for its use of Mardenborough's crash at the Nürburgring Nordschleife as a narrative element. This segment faithfully re-enacted a March 2015 crash during which his Nissan GT-R Nismo became airborne at the notorious Flugplatz turn and cartwheeled over the fence into spectators. One spectator was killed almost immediately and others were taken to the hospital with serious and severe injuries. This crash was depicted in Gran Turismo as a traumatic event for Mardenborough that impacted his racing performance during his debut at the 24 Hours of Le Mans.

The film combines two real races into one event: Jann's debut in LMP2 at Le Mans racing a Zytek Z11SN-Nissan for Greaves Motorsport happened roughly two years before the crash (the team finished 3rd, as depicted in the film); his debut in LMP1 at Le Mans racing a GT-R LM Nismo for Nissan Motorsports came roughly 3 months after the crash (the team did not finish due to a car failure in the 23rd hour).

The use of a dead spectator to enhance the plot was negatively received by critics, with the film being labeled as "tasteless" and "reprehensible". Mardenborough felt "it would have been a disservice for the audience for that not to be in there" and said "...it needed to be correct, because somebody lost their life in this accident.
