= 2019 CTECH Manufacturing 180 =

Race details
- Race 23 of 33 in the 2019 NASCAR Xfinity Series season
- Date: August 24, 2019
- Location: Road America in Elkhart Lake, Wisconsin
- Course: Permanent racing facility
- Course length: 4.048 miles (6.515 km)
- Distance: 45 laps, 182.16 mi (293.16 km)

Pole position
Driver	A. J. Allmendinger	Kaulig Racing
- Time: 2:12.731

Most laps led
Driver	Matt DiBenedetto	Joe Gibbs Racing
- Laps: 18

Winner
No. 20	Christopher Bell	Joe Gibbs Racing

Television in the United States
- Network: NBCSN

Radio in the United States
- Radio: MRN

The 2019 CTECH Manufacturing 180 is a NASCAR Xfinity Series race held on August 24, 2019, at Road America in Elkhart Lake, Wisconsin. Contested over 45 laps on the 4.048-mile (6.515 km) road course, it was the 23rd race of the 2019 NASCAR Xfinity Series season.

== Background ==
=== Track ===
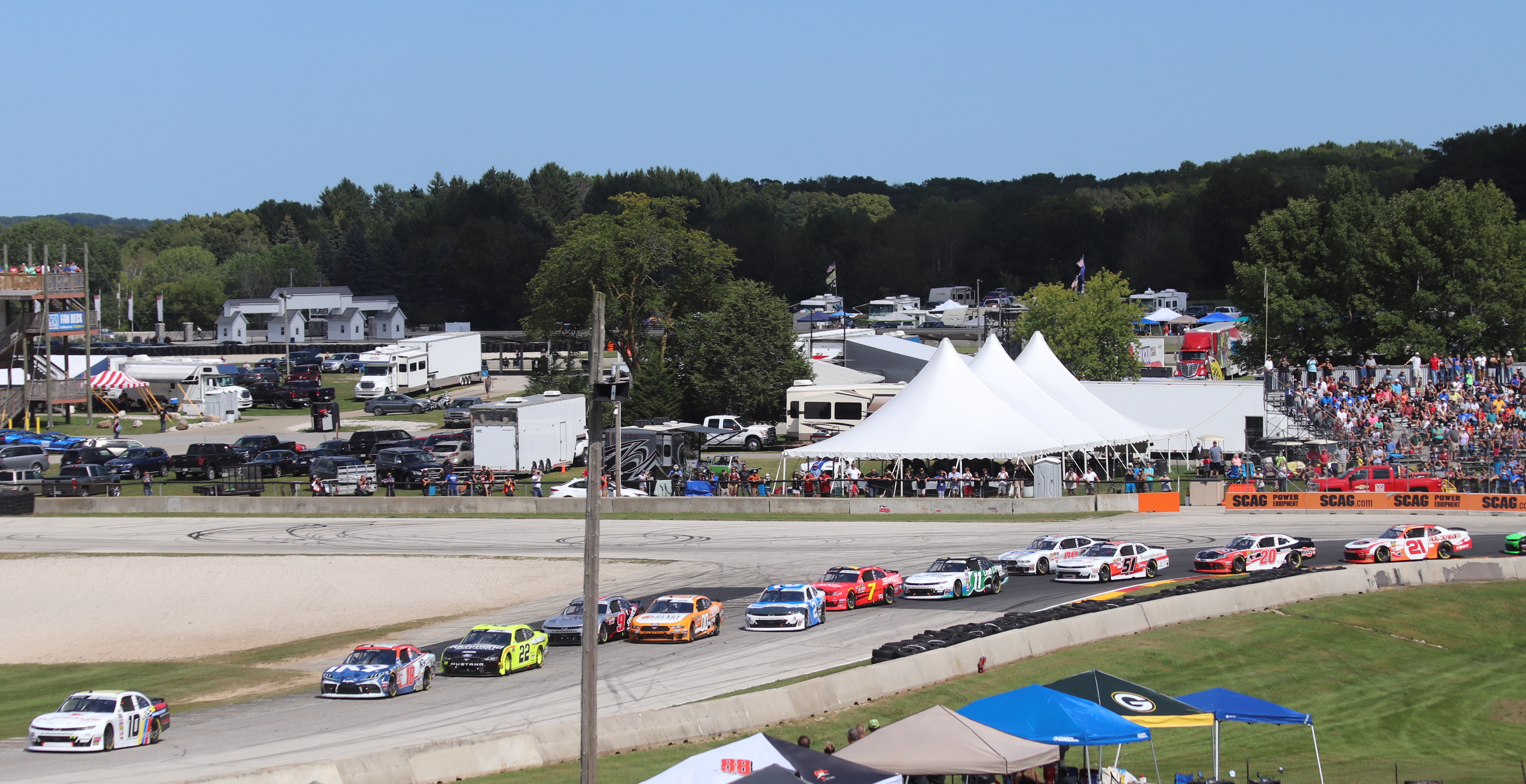
Cars in Turn 5 on the first lap

Road America is a motorsport road course located near Elkhart Lake, Wisconsin on Wisconsin Highway 67. It has hosted races since the 1950s and currently hosts races in the NASCAR Xfinity Series, NTT Indycar Series, NTTWeatherTech SportsCar Championship, SCCA Pirelli World Challenge, ASRA, AMA Superbike series, IndyCar Series, and SCCA Pro Racing's Trans-Am Series.

== Entry list ==
No.	Driver	Team	Manufacturer
00	Cole Custer	Stewart-Haas Racing with Biagi-DenBeste Racing	Ford
0	Garrett Smithley	JD Motorsports	Chevrolet
01	Stephen Leicht	JD Motorsports	Chevrolet
1	Michael Annett	JR Motorsports	Chevrolet
2	Tyler Reddick	Richard Childress Racing	Chevrolet
4	Ryan Vargas	JD Motorsports	Chevrolet
5	Vinnie Miller	B. J. McLeod Motorsports	Chevrolet
07	Ray Black Jr.	SS-Green Light Racing	Chevrolet
7	Justin Allgaier	JR Motorsports	Chevrolet
08	Gray Gaulding (R)	SS-Green Light Racing	Chevrolet
8	Regan Smith	JR Motorsports	Chevrolet
9	Noah Gragson (R)	JR Motorsports	Chevrolet
10	A. J. Allmendinger	Kaulig Racing	Chevrolet
11	Justin Haley (R)	Kaulig Racing	Chevrolet
13	Chad Finchum	MBM Motorsports	Toyota
15	B. J. McLeod	JD Motorsports	Chevrolet
18	Matt DiBenedetto (i)	Joe Gibbs Racing	Toyota
19	Brandon Jones	Joe Gibbs Racing	Toyota
20	Christopher Bell	Joe Gibbs Racing	Toyota
21	Kaz Grala	Richard Childress Racing	Chevrolet
22	Austin Cindric	Team Penske	Ford
23	John Hunter Nemechek (R)	GMS Racing	Chevrolet
35	Joey Gase	MBM Motorsports	Toyota
36	Josh Williams	DGM Racing	Chevrolet
38	J. J. Yeley	RSS Racing	Chevrolet
39	Ryan Sieg	RSS Racing	Chevrolet
43	Preston Pardus	Pardus Racing Inc.	Chevrolet
51	Jeremy Clements	Jeremy Clements Racing	Chevrolet
52	David Starr	Jimmy Means Racing	Chevrolet
61	Dick Karth	MBM Motorsports	Toyota
66	Tommy Joe Martins	MBM Motorsports	Toyota
74	Nicolas Hammann	Mike Harmon Racing	Chevrolet
78	Ryan Ellis	B. J. McLeod Motorsports	Toyota
86	Brandon Brown (R)	Brandonbilt Motorsports	Chevrolet
89	Morgan Shepherd	Shepherd Racing Ventures	Chevrolet
90	Dexter Bean	DGM Racing	Chevrolet
93	Josh Bilicki	RSS Racing	Chevrolet
98	Chase Briscoe (R)	Stewart-Haas Racing with Biagi-DenBeste Racing	Ford
99	Loris Hezemans	B. J. McLeod Motorsports	Chevrolet

== Practice ==
=== First practice ===
Christopher Bell was the fastest in the first practice session with a time of 134.239 seconds and a speed of 108.559 mph (174.709 km/h).

Pos	No.	Driver	Team	Manufacturer	Time	Speed
1	20	Christopher Bell	Joe Gibbs Racing	Toyota	2:14.239	108.559
2	7	Justin Allgaier	JR Motorsports	Chevrolet	2:14.274	108.530
3	22	Austin Cindric	Team Penske	Ford	2:14.503	108.346

=== Final practice ===
Christopher Bell was the fastest in the final practice session with a time of 134.235 seconds and a speed of 108.562 mph (174.714 km/h).

Pos	No.	Driver	Team	Manufacturer	Time	Speed
1	20	Christopher Bell	Joe Gibbs Racing	Toyota	2:14.235	108.562
2	18	Matt DiBenedetto (i)	Joe Gibbs Racing	Toyota	2:14.801	108.106
3	10	A. J. Allmendinger	Kaulig Racing	Chevrolet	2:14.820	108.091

== Qualifying ==
A. J. Allmendinger scored the pole for the race with a time of 132.731 seconds and a speed of 109.792 mph (176.693 km/h).

=== Qualifying results ===
Pos	No	Driver	Team	Manufacturer	Time
1	10	A. J. Allmendinger	Kaulig Racing	Chevrolet	2:12.731
2	18	Matt DiBenedetto (i)	Joe Gibbs Racing	Toyota	2:13.229
3	22	Austin Cindric	Team Penske	Ford	2:13.286
4	00	Cole Custer	Stewart-Haas Racing with Biagi-DenBeste Racing	Ford	2:13.648
5	9	Noah Gragson (R)	JR Motorsports	Chevrolet	2:13.907
6	2	Tyler Reddick	Richard Childress Racing	Chevrolet	2:13.948
7	11	Justin Haley (R)	Kaulig Racing	Chevrolet	2:14.117
8	7	Justin Allgaier	JR Motorsports	Chevrolet	2:14.203
9	51	Jeremy Clements	Jeremy Clements Racing	Chevrolet	2:14.411
10	98	Chase Briscoe (R)	Stewart-Haas Racing with Biagi-DenBeste Racing	Ford	2:14.551
11	21	Kaz Grala	Richard Childress Racing	Chevrolet	2:14.573
12	20	Christopher Bell	Joe Gibbs Racing	Toyota	2:15.881
13	8	Regan Smith	JR Motorsports	Chevrolet	2:14.624
14	23	John Hunter Nemechek (R)	GMS Racing	Chevrolet	2:14.843
15	43	Preston Pardus	Pardus Racing Inc.	Chevrolet	2:14.940
16	93	Josh Bilicki	RSS Racing	Chevrolet	2:15.069
17	39	Ryan Sieg	RSS Racing	Chevrolet	2:15.138
18	1	Michael Annett	JR Motorsports	Chevrolet	2:15.384
19	08	Gray Gaulding (R)	SS-Green Light Racing	Chevrolet	2:15.577
20	19	Brandon Jones	Joe Gibbs Racing	Toyota	2:15.797
21	0	Garrett Smithley	JD Motorsports	Chevrolet	2:16.048
22	78	Ryan Ellis	B. J. McLeod Motorsports	Toyota	2:16.464
23	66	Tommy Joe Martins	MBM Motorsports	Toyota	2:17.023
24	99	Loris Hezemans	B. J. McLeod Motorsports	Chevrolet	2:17.062
25	01	Stephen Leicht	JD Motorsports	Chevrolet	2:17.389
26	86	Brandon Brown (R)	Brandonbilt Motorsports	Chevrolet	2:18.131
27	74	Nicolas Hammann	Mike Harmon Racing	Chevrolet	2:18.135
28	36	Josh Williams	DGM Racing	Chevrolet	2:18.380
29	07	Ray Black Jr.	SS-Green Light Racing	Chevrolet	2:18.526
30	38	J. J. Yeley	RSS Racing	Chevrolet	2:19.522
31	35	Joey Gase	MBM Motorsports	Toyota	2:19.647
32	52	David Starr	Jimmy Means Racing	Chevrolet	2:20.102
33	4	Ryan Vargas	JD Motorsports	Chevrolet	2:20.694
34	15	B. J. McLeod	JD Motorsports	Chevrolet	2:22.713
35	13	Chad Finchum	MBM Motorsports	Toyota	2:22.894
36	90	Dexter Bean	DGM Racing	Chevrolet	2:24.424
37	5	Vinnie Miller	B. J. McLeod Motorsports	Chevrolet	2:27.801
38	61	Dick Karth	MBM Motorsports	Toyota	2:30.590

== Race ==
=== Summary ===
A. J. Allmendinger started on pole and remained in the lead until Stage 1, where he won the stage. Justin Allgaier had locked up the brakes in turn 1 in the gravel, but kept his car away from the tire barrier. The team had to make lengthy repairs to the vehicle. Cole Custer's car took some damage after he mowed down some banners, and Chase Briscoe took the stage 2 win when the leaders pitted.

Brandon Jones, who had to start the race at the rear in a backup car, blew a tire and damaged his right front. With 2 laps left, Gray Gaulding lost his brakes and spun out of control in the gravel. His rear-end got damaged, but track officials towed him out and his team made repairs to return to the race. Matt DiBenedetto (who led the most laps) lost control on the final turn while running second and ultimately finished one lap down. Christopher Bell (who struggled with handling issues during Stage 1) took the lead and managed to hold off Austin Cindric (who weaved his way through from 20th to second) to win the race.

=== Stage results ===
Stage One Laps: 10

Pos	No	Driver	Team	Manufacturer	Points
1	10	A. J. Allmendinger	Kaulig Racing	Chevrolet	10
2	22	Austin Cindric	Team Penske	Ford	9
3	00	Cole Custer	Stewart-Haas Racing with Biagi-DenBeste	Ford	8
4	2	Tyler Reddick	Richard Childress Racing	Chevrolet	7
5	11	Justin Haley (R)	Kaulig Racing	Chevrolet	6
6	98	Chase Briscoe (R)	Stewart-Haas Racing with Biagi-DenBeste	Ford	5
7	9	Noah Gragson (R)	JR Motorsports	Chevrolet	4
8	51	Jeremy Clements	Jeremy Clements Racing	Chevrolet	3
9	39	Ryan Sieg	RSS Racing	Chevrolet	2
10	1	Michael Annett	JR Motorsports	Chevrolet	1

Stage Two Laps: 10

Pos	No	Driver	Team	Manufacturer	Points
1	98	Chase Briscoe (R)	Stewart-Haas Racing with Biagi-DenBeste	Ford	10
2	11	Justin Haley (R)	Kaulig Racing	Chevrolet	9
3	8	Regan Smith	JR Motorsports	Chevrolet	8
4	51	Jeremy Clements	Jeremy Clements Racing	Chevrolet	7
5	9	Noah Gragson (R)	JR Motorsports	Chevrolet	6
6	39	Ryan Sieg	RSS Racing	Chevrolet	5
7	08	Gray Gaulding	SS-Green Light Racing	Chevrolet	4
8	19	Brandon Jones	Joe Gibbs Racing	Toyota	3
9	23	John Hunter Nemechek (R)	GMS Racing	Chevrolet	2
10	93	Josh Bilicki	RSS Racing	Chevrolet	1

=== Final stage results ===
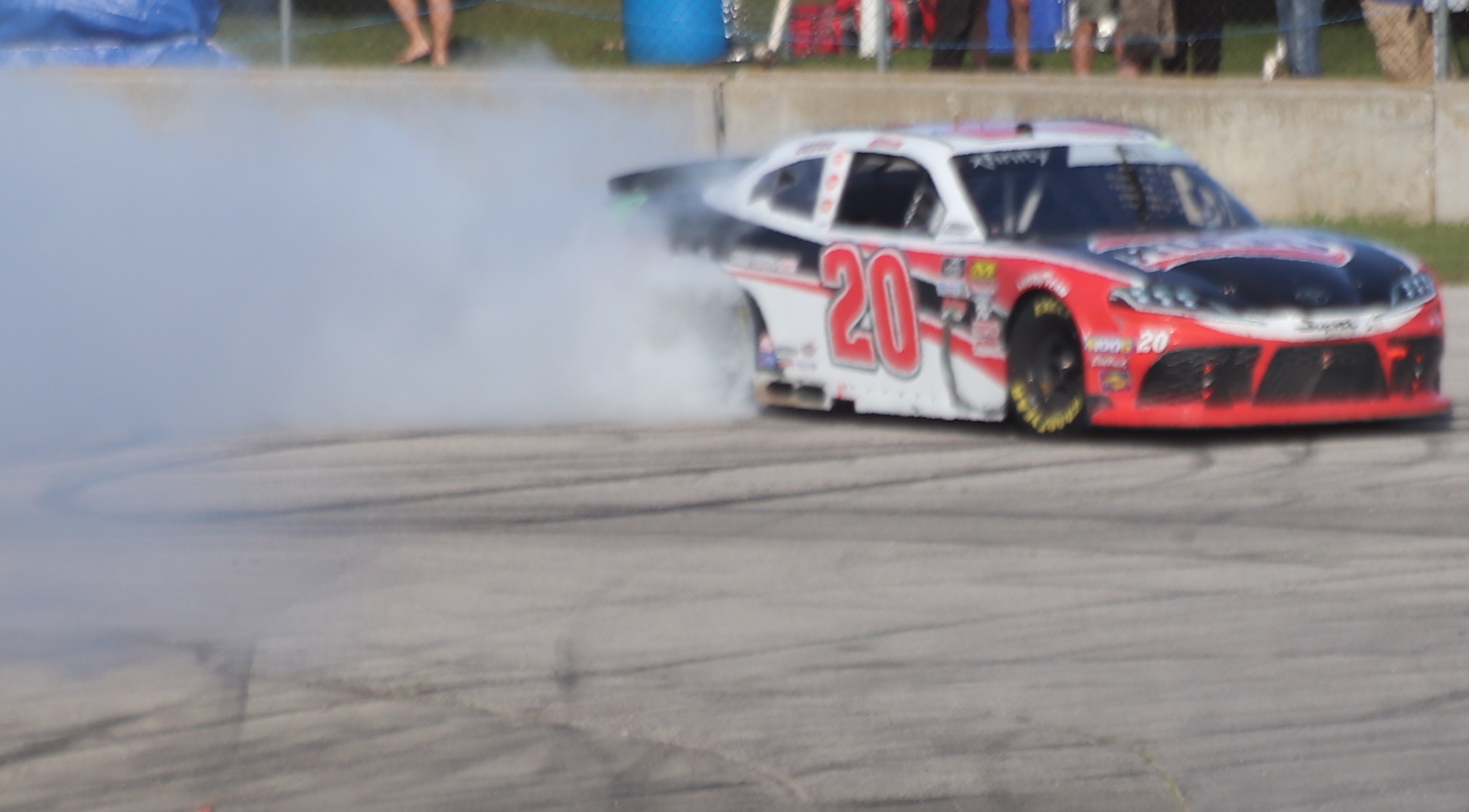
Christopher Bell does a burnout after winning the race

Stage Three Laps: 25

Pos	Grid	No	Driver	Team	Manufacturer	Laps	Points
1	12	20	Christopher Bell	Joe Gibbs Racing	Toyota	45	40
2	3	22	Austin Cindric	Team Penske	Ford	45	44
3	6	2	Tyler Reddick	Richard Childress Racing	Chevrolet	45	41
4	5	9	Noah Gragson (R)	JR Motorsports	Chevrolet	45	43
5	11	21	Kaz Grala	Richard Childress Racing	Chevrolet	45	32
6	7	11	Justin Haley (R)	Kaulig Racing	Chevrolet	45	46
7	10	98	Chase Briscoe (R)	Stewart-Haas Racing with Biagi-DenBeste	Ford	45	45
8	9	51	Jeremy Clements	Jeremy Clements Racing	Chevrolet	45	39
9	8	7	Justin Allgaier	JR Motorsports	Chevrolet	45	28
10	4	00	Cole Custer	Stewart-Haas Racing with Biagi-DenBeste	Ford	45	35
11	17	39	Ryan Sieg	RSS Racing	Chevrolet	45	33
12	18	1	Michael Annett	JR Motorsports	Chevrolet	45	26
13	13	8	Regan Smith	JR Motorsports	Chevrolet	45	32
14	29	07	Ray Black Jr.	SS-Green Light Racing	Chevrolet	45	23
15	27	74	Nicolas Hammann	Mike Harmon Racing	Chevrolet	45	22
16	20	19	Brandon Jones	Joe Gibbs Racing	Toyota	45	24
17	32	52	David Starr	Jimmy Means Racing	Chevrolet	45	20
18	33	4	Ryan Vargas	JD Motorsports	Chevrolet	45	19
19	31	35	Joey Gase	MBM Motorsports	Toyota	45	18
20	16	93	Josh Bilicki	RSS Racing	Chevrolet	45	18
21	22	78	Ryan Ellis	B. J. McLeod Motorsports	Toyota	45	16
22	24	99	Loris Hezemans	B. J. McLeod Motorsports	Chevrolet	45	15
23	34	15	B. J. McLeod	JD Motorsports	Chevrolet	45	14
24	1	10	A. J. Allmendinger	Kaulig Racing	Chevrolet	45	23
25	23	66	Tommy Joe Martins	MBM Motorsports	Toyota	45	12
26	14	23	John Hunter Nemechek (R)	GMS Racing	Chevrolet	45	13
27	2	18	Matt DiBenedetto (i)	Joe Gibbs Racing	Toyota	44	0
28	37	5	Vinnie Miller	B. J. McLeod Motorsports	Chevrolet	44	9
29	19	08	Gray Gaulding	SS-Green Light Racing	Chevrolet	44	12
30	38	61	Dick Karth	MBM Motorsports	Toyota	43	7
31	28	36	Josh Williams	DGM Racing	Chevrolet	41	6
32	36	90	Dexter Bean	DGM Racing	Chevrolet	39	5
33	21	0	Garrett Smithley	JD Motorsports	Chevrolet	37	4
34	25	01	Stephen Leicht	JD Motorsports	Chevrolet	36	3
35	35	13	Chad Finchum	MBM Motorsports	Toyota	15	2
36	15	43	Preston Pardus	Pardus Racing Inc.	Chevrolet	14	1
37	26	86	Brandon Brown (R)	Brandonbilt Motorsports	Chevrolet	10	1
38	30	38	J. J. Yeley	RSS Racing	Chevrolet	2	1

- After being lapped and struggling early on in the race in his Xfinity Series debut, Dick Karth did not complete the race and around lap 15, he was replaced by Timmy Hill. Since Karth started the race, he is officially credited with the 30th-place finish.

Previous race: 2019 Food City 300	NASCAR Xfinity Series; 2019 season	Next race: 2019 Sport Clips Haircuts VFW 200
