= Nicolas Hammann =

American professional road racing driver

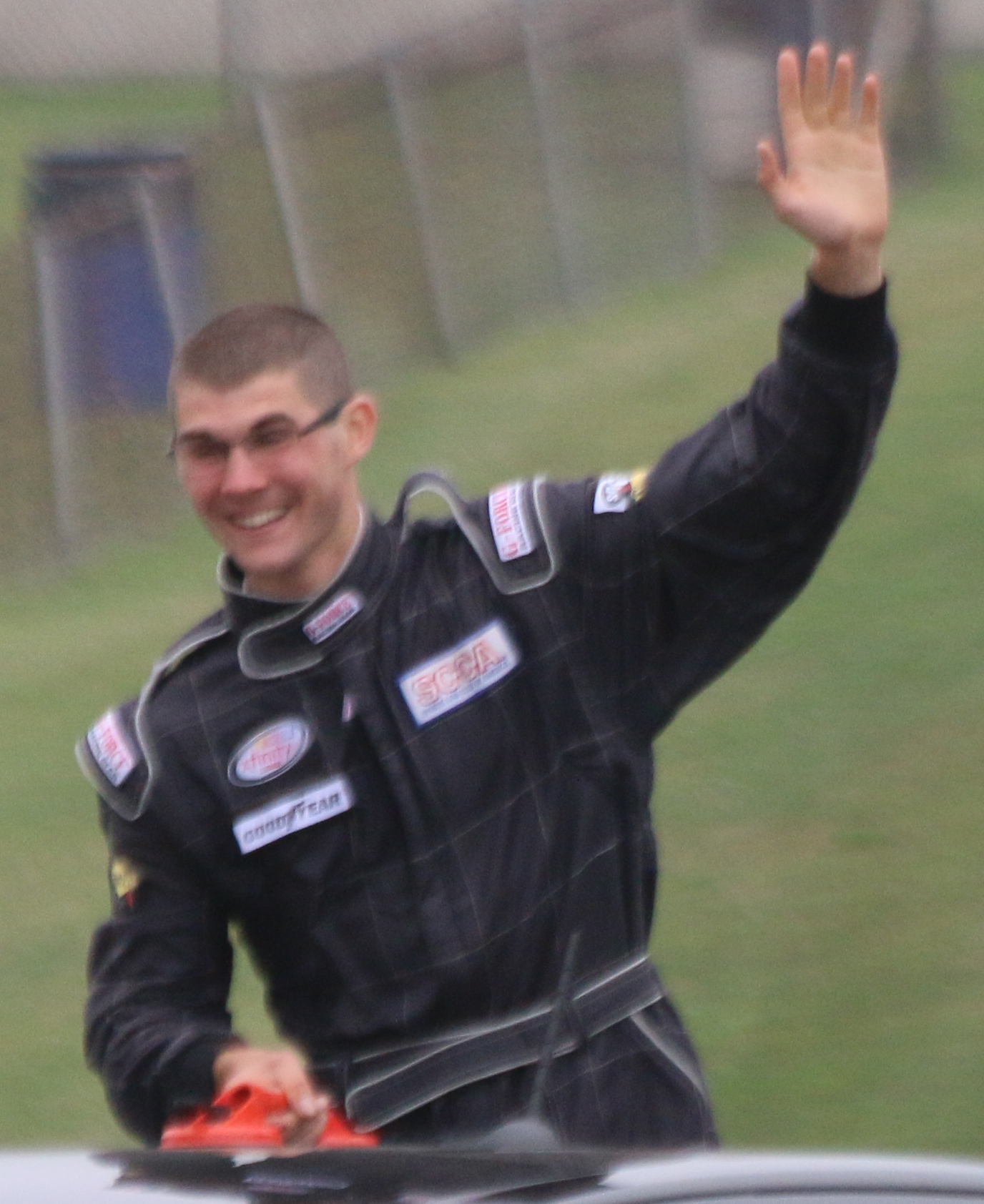
- Hammann at Road America in 2016
- Nationality: (United States) American
- Born: Nicolas J. Hammann; July 26, 1993 (age 33) Elkhart Lake, Wisconsin, U.S.
- Categorisation: FIA Bronze (until 2015); FIA Silver (2016–)
- Achievements: 2014 GT Academy winner

NASCAR O'Reilly Auto Parts Series career
- 4 races run over 3 years
- 2019 position: 65th
- Best finish: 65th (2019)
- First race: 2016 Zippo 200 at The Glen (Watkins Glen)
- Last race: 2019 CTECH Manufacturing 180 (Road America)
Wins	Top tens	Poles
0	0	0
- Statistics up to date as of November 18, 2019.

Nicolas J. Hammann (born July 26, 1993) is an American professional road racing driver. He won the 2014 U.S. GT Academy television show. Hammann made his first NASCAR start at Watkins Glen International in 2016.

== Background ==
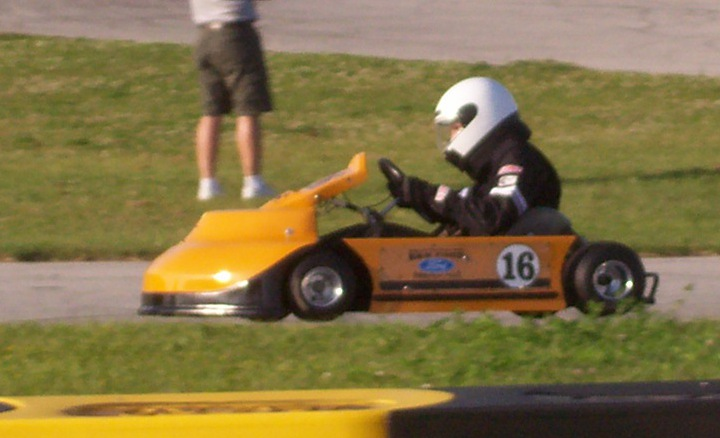
Hammann's 2008 kart at the Briggs & Statton Motorplex

Hammann helped at his family's garage in Elkhart Lake. The village is the home of Road America. After his father quit racing, Hammann began racing karts as a six-year-old on the Karting Kettle (now the Briggs & Stratton Motorplex) at Road America. He won track championships in 2007, 2008, and 2009. In 2010, the 16-year-old got an SCCA license to race cars and competed in the STU and STL classes. He raced at Road America's June Sprints SCCA, along with Blackhawk Farms, Gingerman Raceway, and the Mid-Ohio Sports Car Course. Hammann set the Kiel High School track and field record in the 800 meters and qualified for the state competition. After graduating from high school, he went to college to study mechanical engineering at the University of North Carolina at Charlotte, hoping to become a test driver. He graduated in May 2018 with an concentration in motorsports.

== GT Academy ==
As he was finishing high school, Hammann heard about a racing competition on television show called GT Academy. The show gives PlayStation Gran Turismo video game drivers a chance to compete in a variety of scenarios on real racing tracks. Only the fastest 32 drivers on a specified course advance to the following round. He finished in the top-100 in high school then top-60 in his first year of college. At a Road America race, he met one of the previous winners of the show who was racing professionally after beginning his career as a parts delivery driver. The experience caused Hammann to see the potential of show and he began to take the competition very seriously; he studied other top competitors' lap times and frequently practiced. His mother gave him improved steering equipment as a Christmas present. Hammann raced over 3,400 miles (5,500 km) to obtain his best lap time and averaged nearly 300 miles (480 km) per day; his best time was in the fastest 20 (within the top 32 positions out of 450,000 competitors)) to advance to the next round in New York City. He took a break from college to compete 2014 show. Judges, including Danny Sullivan, interviewed Hammann to see how well he would represent Nissan, his fitness, and his skills. He made the top 12 and was entered in a week-long competition at Silverstone, England. Hammann won the competition.

== Racing career ==
After winning the show, Hammann was signed as a Nissan factory driver. He earned an International license and competed in the 2015 Dubai 24 Hour endurance race. His team of five drivers finished 5th overall (and second in the GT3 class) in a Nissan GTR GT3 car. He competed in several different classes at different tracks throughout the world including the Blancpain Sprint Series, IMSA Continental Tire SportsCar Challenge, and Pirelli World Challenge. For 2016, Hammann raced in the NISSAN MicraCup series in Quebec.

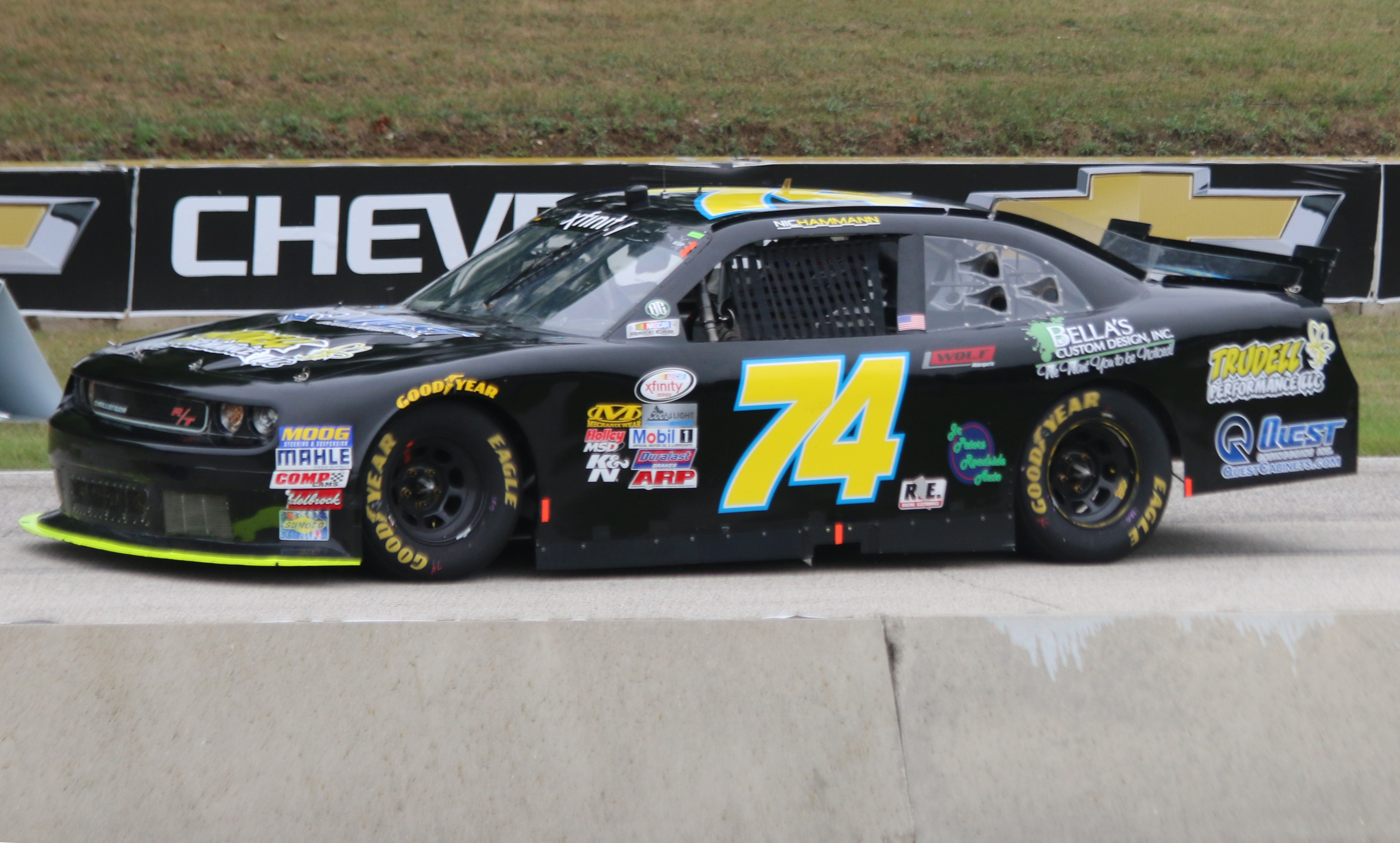
Hammann's NASCAR Xfinity Series car at Road America, 2016

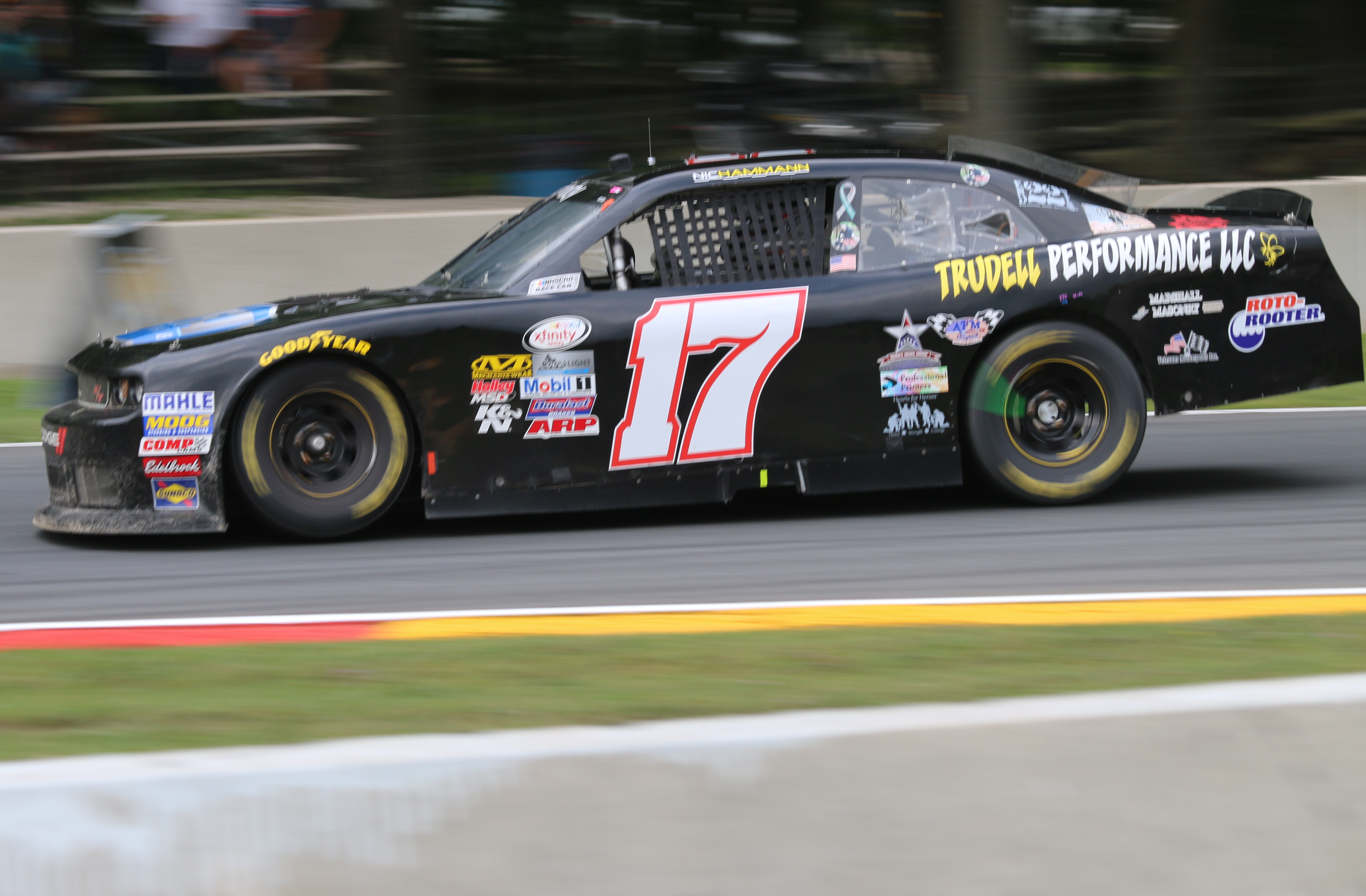
Hammann's 2017 No. 17 Xfinity Series car at Road America, 2017

Hammann made his first NASCAR Xfinity Series start as a road course ringer at Watkins Glen International on August 6, 2016. Hammann had been working at his family garage when Mike Harmon came in to have a tire serviced for the 2015 Road America 180. He asked Harmon to let him know if he ever needs a driver and Harmon called the following year. He qualified to start 36th in the Mike Harmon Racing No. 74 for the Zippo 200 at the Glen. His car was involved with a Kyle Busch spin; he recovered until his race ended with an oil leak after completing 67 of 82 laps for a 28th-place finish. Hammann made his second start at the 2016 Road America 180 in his hometown. He qualified 33rd and passed several cars during the race. He completed a total of 22 (of the 48) laps with his race ending early with mechanical issues.

== Personal life ==
Hammann's parents are Gary and Debbie Hammann; he has two older sisters.

== Motorsports career results ==
=== NASCAR ===
(key) (Bold – Pole position awarded by qualifying time. Italics – Pole position earned by points standings or practice time. * – Most laps led.)

==== Xfinity Series ====
NASCAR Xfinity Series results
Year	Team	No.	Make	1	2	3	4	5	6	7	8	9	10	11	12	13	14	15	16	17	18	19	20	21	22	23	24	25	26	27	28	29	30	31	32	33	NXSC	Pts	Ref
2016	Mike Harmon Racing	74	Dodge	DAY	ATL	LVS	PHO	CAL	TEX	BRI	RCH	TAL	DOV	CLT	POC	MCH	IOW	DAY	KEN	NHA	IND	IOW	GLN; 28	MOH	BRI	ROA; 36	DAR	RCH	CHI	KEN	DOV	CLT	KAN	TEX	PHO	HOM	68th	18	
2017	Mike Harmon Racing	17	Dodge	DAY	ATL	LVS	PHO	CAL	TEX	BRI	RCH	TAL	CLT	DOV	POC	MCH	IOW	DAY	KEN	NHA	IND	IOW	GLN	MOH	BRI	ROA; 29	DAR	RCH	CHI	KEN	DOV	CLT	KAN	TEX	PHO	HOM	72nd	8	
2019	Mike Harmon Racing	74	Chevy	DAY	ATL	LVS	PHO	CAL	TEX	BRI	RCH	TAL	DOV	CLT	POC	MCH	IOW	CHI	DAY	KEN	NHA	IOW	GLN	MOH	BRI	ROA; 15	DAR	IND	LVS	RCH	CLT	DOV	KAN	TEX	PHO	HOM	65th	22	

^{*} Season still in progress
^{1} Ineligible for series points
