= Jann Mardenborough =

British racing driver (born 1991)

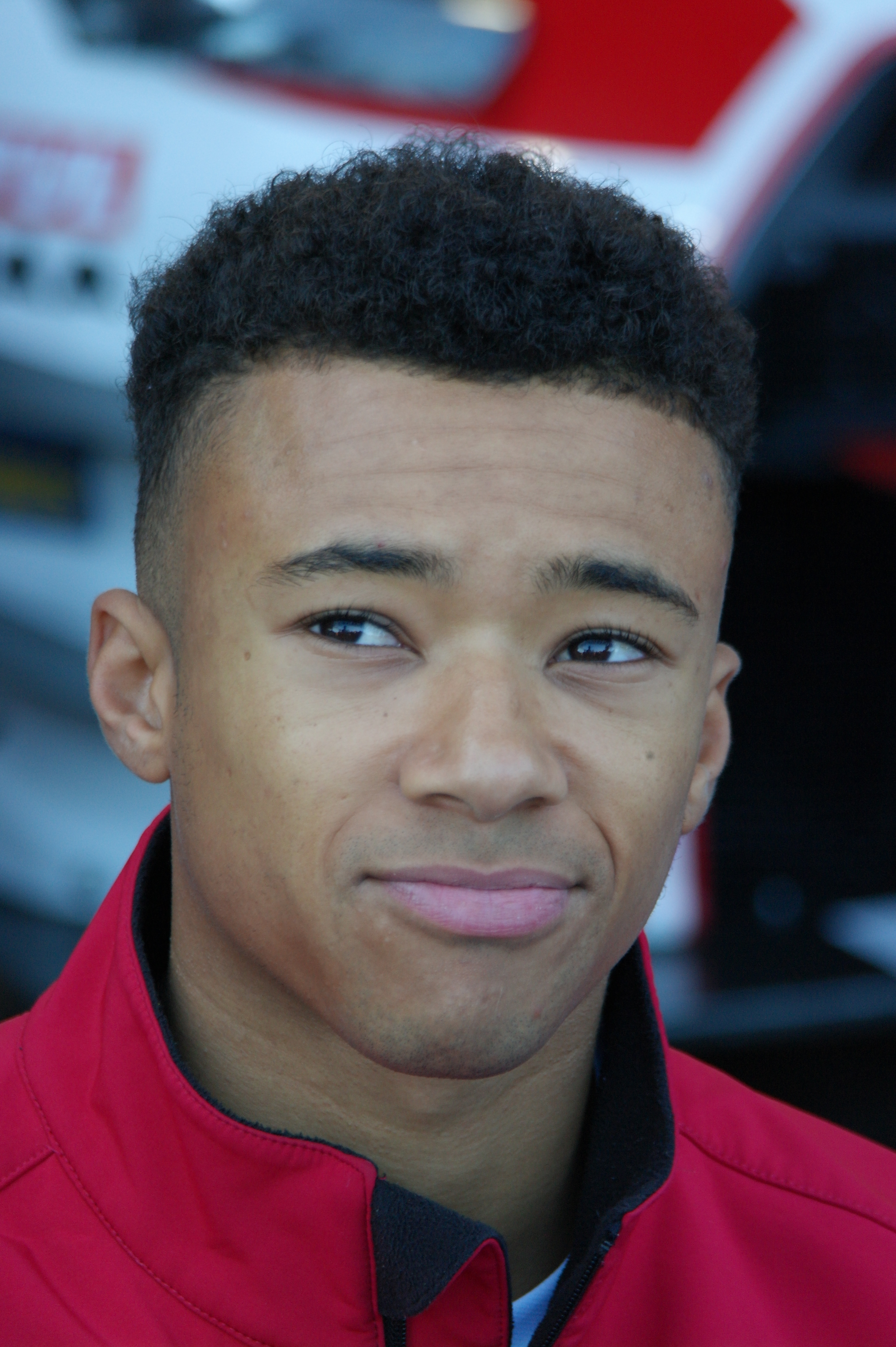
- Mardenborough in 2014
- Nationality: (United Kingdom) British
- Born: Jann Alexander Mardenborough; 9 September 1991 (age 35) Darlington, County Durham, England

GTWC Europe Endurance Cup career
- Debut season: 2012
- Current team: HRT Ford Performance
- Categorisation: FIA Bronze (2012); FIA Silver (2013); FIA Gold (2014, 2023–); FIA Platinum (2015–2022)
- Car number: 64
- Former teams: Nissan GT Academy Team RJN
- Starts: 10
- Wins: 0
- Podiums: 3
- Poles: 0
- Fastest laps: 1
- Best finish: 14th in 2014

Previous series
- 2016–2020 2017 2016 2015 2015 2014–2015 2013–2014 2013 2013 2012 2011 2011: Super GT; Super Formula; Japanese Formula 3 FIA WEC; GP2 Series; GP3 Series; Toyota Racing Series; British Formula 3 FIA European Formula 3 British GT Championship; GT4 European Cup; Britcar 24hr

24 Hours of Le Mans career
- Years: 2013–2015
- Teams: Greaves Motorsport, OAK Racing, Nissan Motorsports
- Best finish: Overall: 9th (2013, 2014); In class: 3rd (2013)

Jann Alexander Mardenborough (/ˈjɑːn ˈmɛnbərə/ YAHN men-buh-ruh; born 9 September 1991) is a British professional racing driver. He currently competes in the 2025 GT World Challenge Europe Endurance Cup for HRT Ford Performance. In 2011, he became the third and youngest winner of the GT Academy competition, beating 90,000 entrants to earn a professional racing contract with Nissan. He had no motorsport experience, having played sim racing video games instead. During his career, he has finished on the podium in his class at the 24 Hours of Le Mans, won races and contended for titles in GT3 and junior formula cars, and competed at the highest level in Super GT, Super Formula and the FIA World Endurance Championship.

Following his GT Academy win, Mardenborough was rewarded with a drive for Nissan at the Dubai 24 Hour race in 2012, finishing third in class. Subsequently, he competed full-time in the British GT Championship, scoring a race victory and challenging for the title. In 2013, he competed in the European and British Formula 3 championships, before moving to the GP3 Series for 2014 and 2015. He was a race winner in GP3, and also finished second overall in the Toyota Racing Series in 2014. He also competed in the 24 Hours of Le Mans, finishing third in the LMP2 class on his debut in 2013 and helping his team lead the category for 14 hours the following year. He competed for Nissan Motorsports in the top LMP1 class of the 2015 FIA World Endurance Championship, but the team withdrew from the series after one race because of a very uncompetitive car.

In 2016, Mardenborough moved to race in Japan, where he competed in the top-level Super GT and Super Formula championships. In the 2016 season, he won a race and was a title contender in the lower GT300 class of Super GT, while also finishing runner-up in the Japanese Formula 3 Championship. In 2017, he moved up to the top GT500 class, where he raced until the end of 2020, scoring a single podium finish and contending for wins on multiple occasions. 2017 was his only season in Super Formula, where he took a pole position.

In 2015, Mardenborough was named as one of the 50 most marketable athletes in the world by Sports Pro Media. The 2023 film Gran Turismo is loosely based on his career.

== Personal life ==
Mardenborough was born in Darlington to English footballer Steve Mardenborough during the three years his father played for Darlington F.C. He spent most of his childhood in Cardiff, Wales.

Mardenborough is portrayed by Archie Madekwe in the 2023 racing film Gran Turismo. Mardenborough serves as a co-producer, stunt driver and consultant on the movie, which depicts his early career and personal life. He gave permission for the filmmakers to include his 2015 crash at the Nürburgring Nordschleife, which killed one spectator. He felt it "would have been a disservice for the audience for that not to be in there".

== Career ==
=== Early life and GT Academy ===
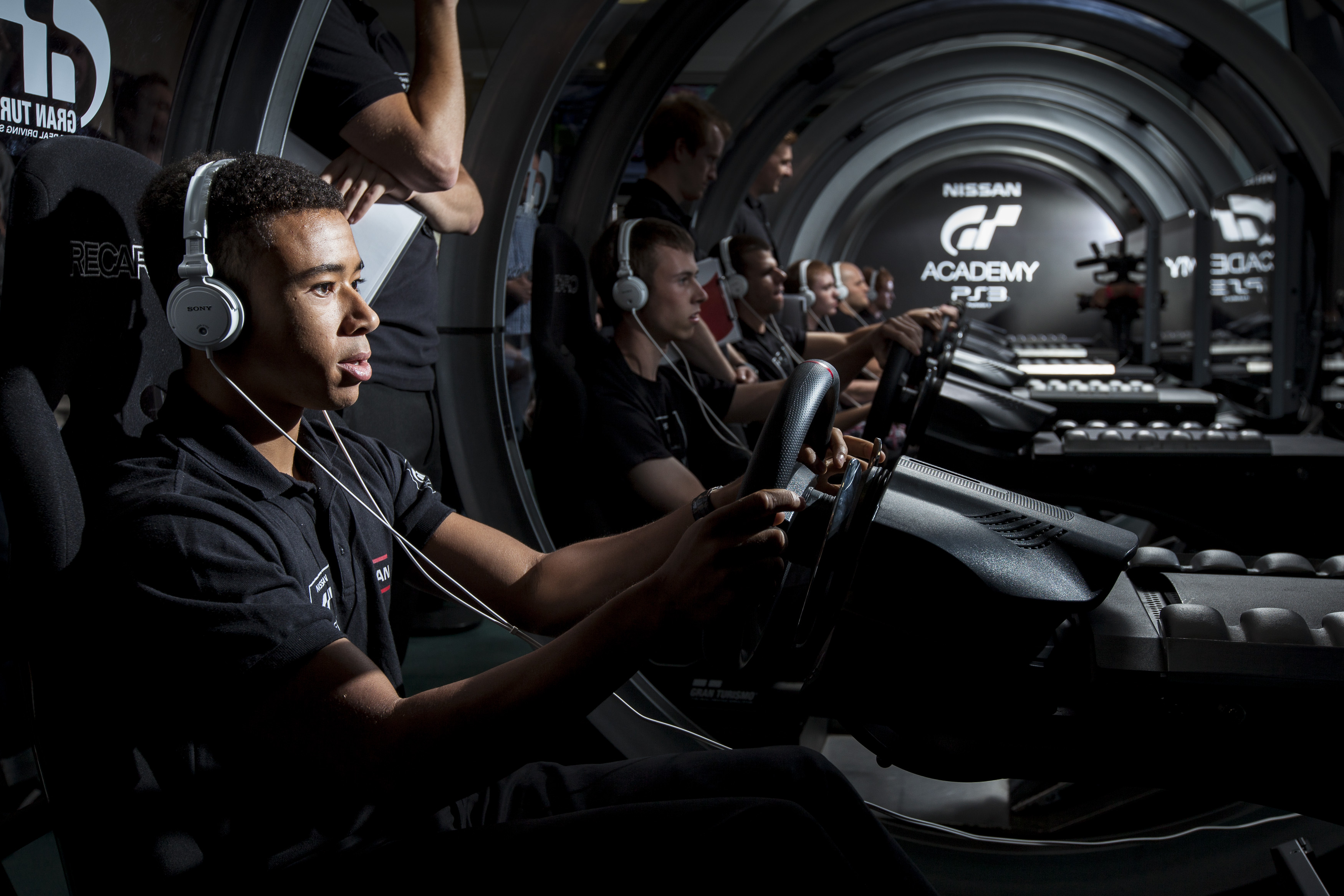
Mardenborough playing Gran Turismo 5 on a sim racing rig in 2013

Mardenborough became interested in cars and dreamed of becoming a professional racing driver from the age of five or six, having learnt that it could be a job. He shelved the idea as he got older as his family did not have the money to start a career in motorsport, and he did not know anyone who could sponsor him. He began playing racing video games at the age of eight, when his friend had Gran Turismo on the original PlayStation. He visited to play the game so often he was eventually given the console and game to play at home. Mardenborough played the game almost constantly, including subsequent Gran Turismo titles on the PlayStation 2 and PlayStation 3, later with a force feedback steering wheel and pedals.

In 2010, Mardenborough went to university to study motorsport engineering but dropped out after three weeks as it was too maths-based for his liking. During a gap year, he entered an online time trial for the GT Academy competition on Gran Turismo 5, which offered a professional racing contract with Nissan to the overall winner. Among over 90,000 contestants, Mardenborough scored in the top 20 in his region required to qualify for the next stages. He then underwent training and a series of physical and racing challenges, culminating as one of four contenders left for the final - a real-life 20-minute race at the Silverstone National Circuit in Nissan 370Z sports cars. Mardenborough won by eight seconds to be crowned GT Academy winner, and earn the Nissan professional contract.

Mardenborough had never driven a high-performance car or been on a racetrack before GT Academy.

=== Early racing career (2011–2015) ===
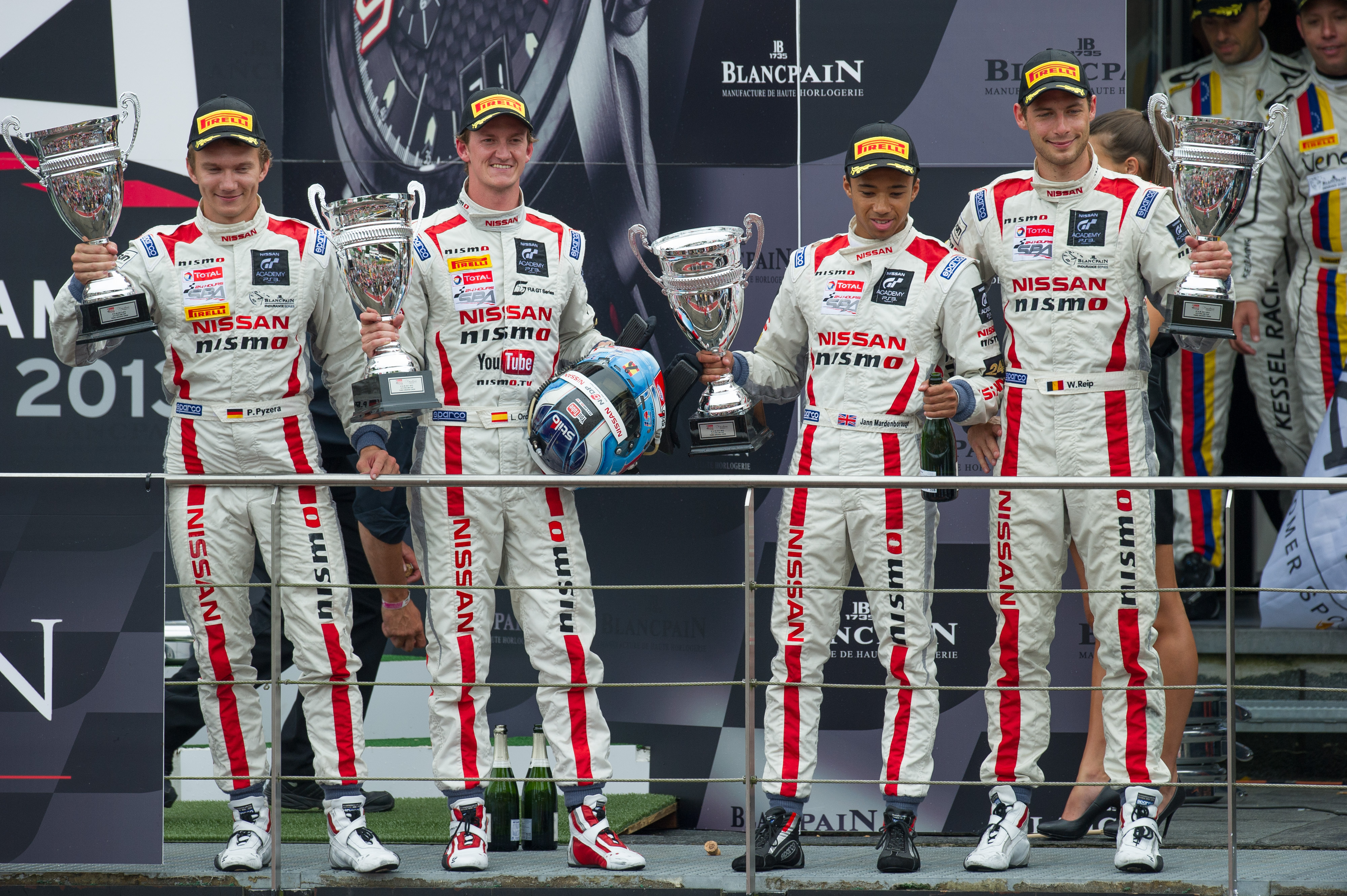
Peter Pyzera, Lucas Ordóñez, Jann Mardenborough and Wolfgang Reip on the podium after the Spa 24 Hours 2013

Mardenborough took part in the 2011 GT Academy competition, a joint venture between Nissan and "Gran Turismo" developers to identify potential racers via online racing events. Mardenborough won the competition despite having no prior professional racing experience.

Following his GT Academy victory, Mardenborough began a driver training programme and competed in several national races, qualifying for an international racing licence. He was rewarded with a drive in a factory-backed Nissan 370Z GT4 at the Dubai 24 Hour race in January 2012. Driving alongside fellow GT Academy winners Lucas Ordóñez, Jordan Tresson and Bryan Heitkotter, he finished third in his class and 26th overall. During the rest of 2012, Mardenborough competed for RJN Motorsport in the British GT Championship with a Nissan GT-R GT3. Together with Alex Buncombe, he won a race at Brands Hatch and ended the season in sixth place in the GT3 championship. The pair had been on course to win the title in the final race until damper issues forced them outside the points. He also took part in four rounds of the Blancpain Endurance Series.

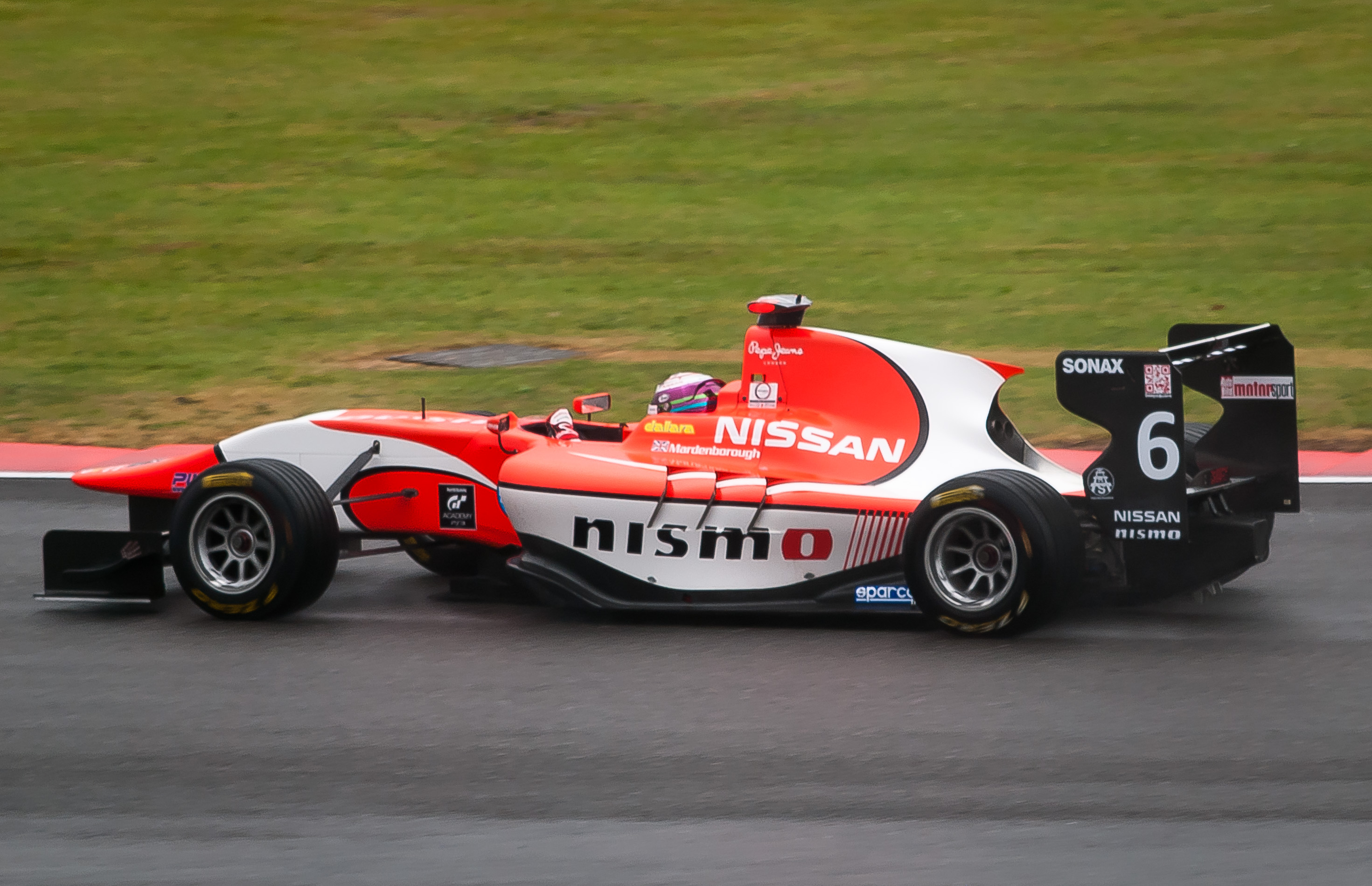
Mardenborough driving for Arden International during the 2014 GP3 Series season

In 2013, Mardenborough switched to formula racing. At the beginning of the year, he contested the 2013 season of the Toyota Racing Series in New Zealand. He was the best-placed rookie and finished the season in tenth place in the championship. After that, he returned to Europe and secured a seat with Carlin Motorsport in the 2013 campaign of the FIA European Formula Three Championship, as well as the British Formula 3 Championship. He scored two podium results and finished sixth overall in the British series, while he was 21st out of 36 drivers in the European championship. In 2014, Mardenborough again competed in New Zealand's Toyota Racing Series at the start of the year, finishing second in the championship, only eight points behind the champion. He then joined Arden International to compete in the 2014 GP3 Series, the third-tier feeder series to Formula One, and was also signed by Red Bull Racing for a driver development programme. He won his first GP3 race in Germany after starting from pole position and setting the fastest lap in the reversed-grid sprint race. An additional podium and seven further points finishes during the season placed him ninth in the overall standings out of 36 competitors, ahead of his two teammates.

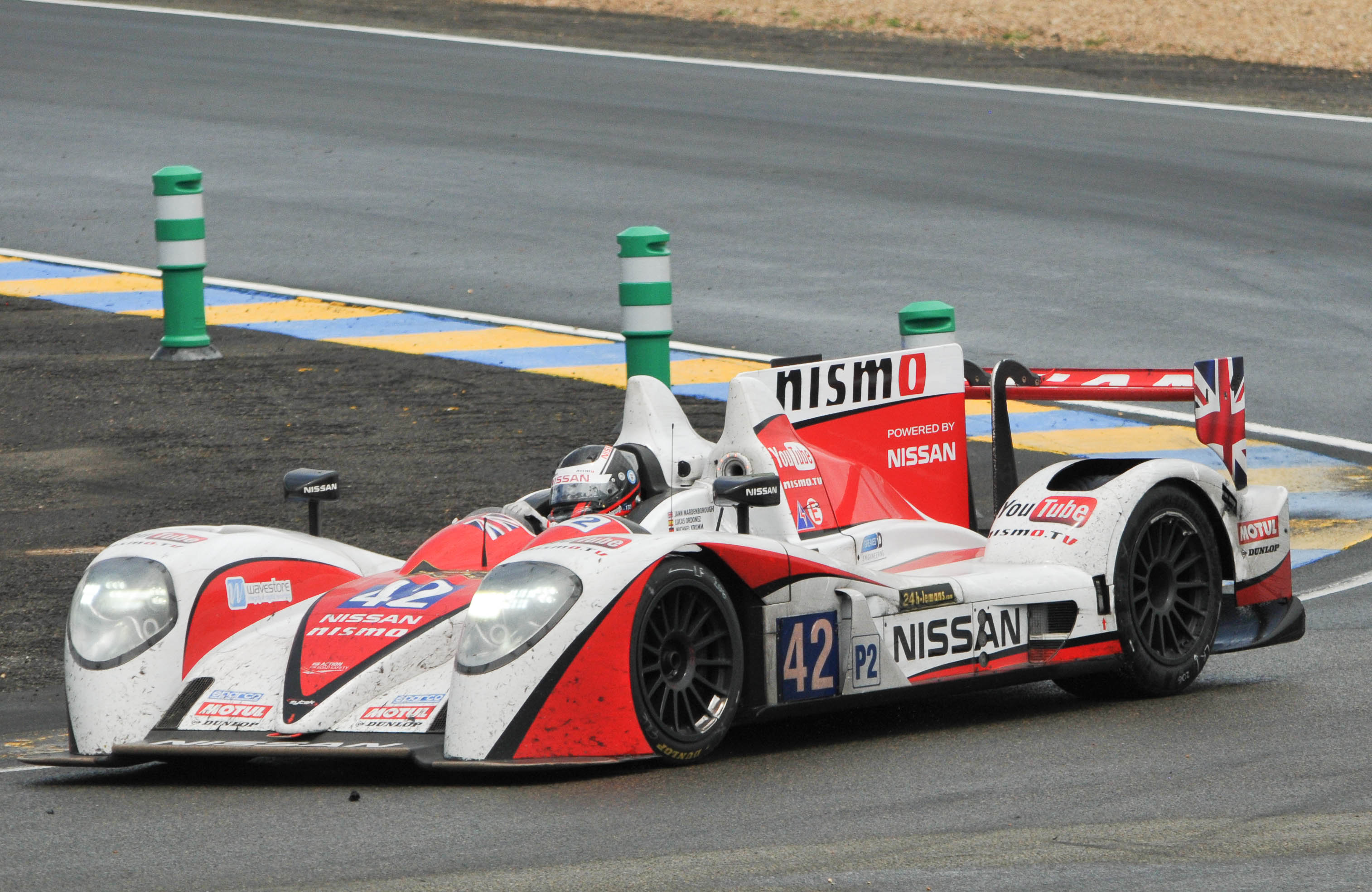
Mardenborough driving at the 2013 24 Hours of Le Mans, where he achieved a podium finish in the LMP2 class

Mardenborough made his debut at the 24 Hours of Le Mans in 2013, driving a Zytek Z11SN-Nissan for Greaves Motorsport alongside Lucas Ordóñez and Michael Krumm in the LMP2 class. Throughout a wet/dry race, the crew fought for a podium finish despite losing time due to untimely safety car periods, and ultimately achieved the feat by finishing third in class and ninth overall after a car ahead of them was disqualified post-race. Later during the summer, he took part in the Spa 24 Hours in a Nissan GT-R GT3 together with Wolfgang Reip, Lucas Ordóñez and Peter Pyzera. This full GT Academy lineup claimed third position in the Pro-Am class and seventh overall. Mardenborough returned to Le Mans in 2014 with OAK Racing, whose Ligier-Nissan LMP2 car he shared with Alex Brundle and Mark Shulzhitskiy. The trio led the LMP2 category for 14 hours and were in contention for the win until a spark plug issue with two hours remaining dropped them to fifth in class and ninth overall at the finish.

At the 2014 Goodwood Festival of Speed, Mardenborough set the fastest-ever supercar time up the famous "Goodwood Hill" whilst piloting the Nismo Nissan GT-R with the optional 'Time Attack' package.

In 2015, Mardenborough was selected as one of the drivers for Nissan Motorsports' entry into the top LMP1 class of the FIA World Endurance Championship (WEC), which includes the 24 Hours of Le Mans. He also continued racing in GP3, switching to Carlin for the 2015 season. Nissan entered the WEC with an unconventional front-engined car, named the GT-R LM Nismo. The team missed the first two races of the season while trying to improve the car, before making their debut at Le Mans. The GT-R LM Nismo proved highly uncompetitive during the race and Mardenborough's No. 23 car broke down terminally with an hour remaining, but he was consistently the quickest of the three drivers in his car. Nissan withdrew from the remainder of the season and eventually cancelled the programme at the end of the year. In GP3, he claimed two podiums and scored points on six occasions to finish ninth overall ahead of future IndyCar champion Álex Palou. He missed four races during the season as he took part in a round of the GP2 Series as a substitute for another driver at Carlin and had a testing commitment at the end of the year.

On 28 March 2015, during a one-off outing in the VLN series, his GT3-class Nissan GT-R Nismo caught air at the Flugplatz section of the Nürburgring Nordschleife. It cartwheeled over the fence into spectators. One person was killed and several were injured, while Mardenborough was not seriously injured.

Mardenborough's achievements and growing global profile led to Sports Pro Media naming him 50th on their 2015 list of the 50 most marketable athletes in the world.

=== Full-time career in Japan (2016–2020) ===
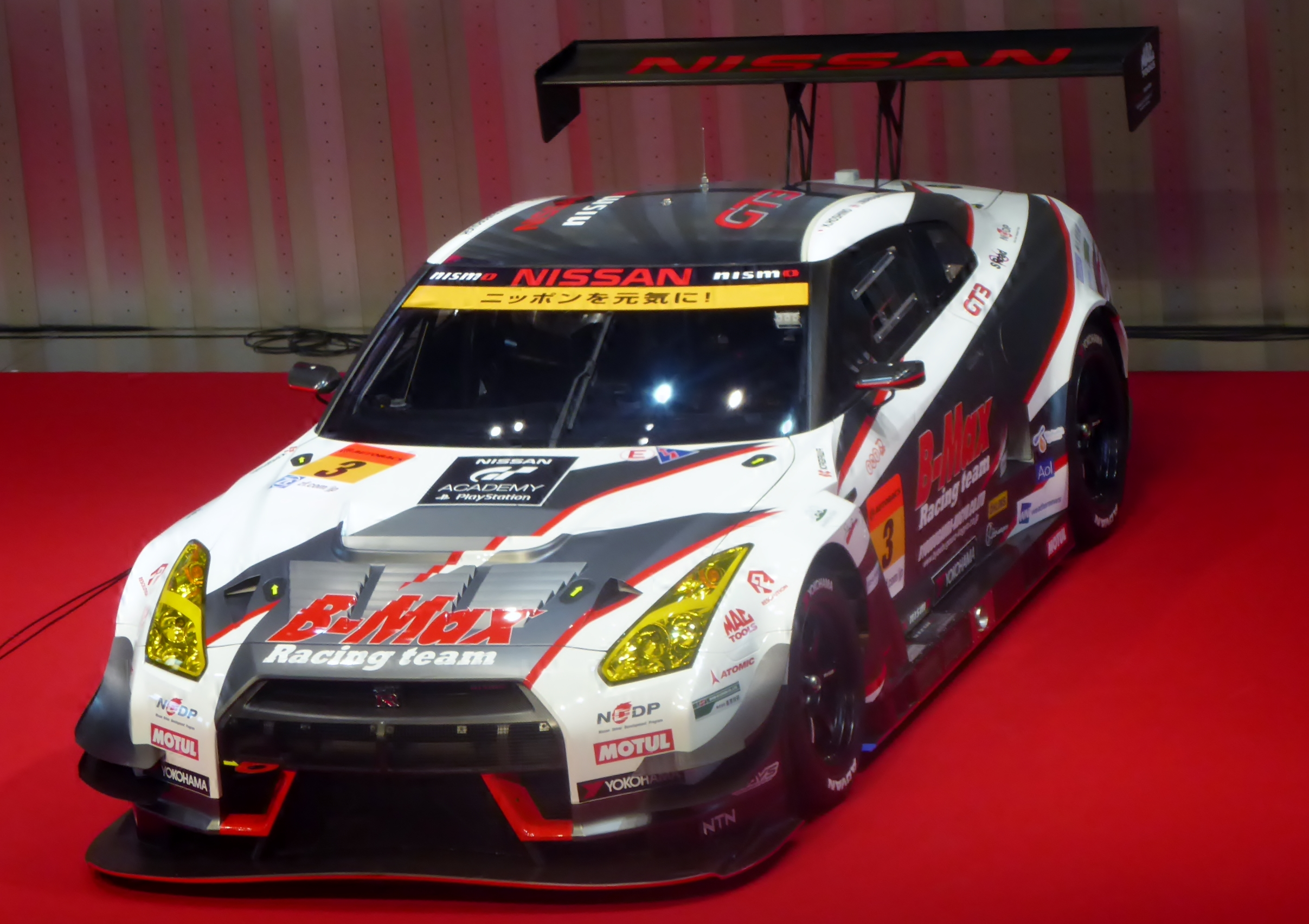
The Nissan GT-R GT3 in which Mardenborough took his first Super GT win in the GT300 class in 2016

In 2016, Mardenborough moved to Japan to compete in the GT300 class of Super GT and the Japanese Formula 3 Championship. In Super GT, driving a Nissan GT-R GT3 for NDDP Racing alongside co-driver Kazuki Hoshino, he scored a maiden win in the second round of the season, the Fuji 500 km, and a further podium finish at Buriram saw the pair enter the season-ending double-header at Motegi just two points off the championship lead, although they ultimately finished fourth overall. His Japanese F3 campaign with B-Max Racing saw him claim four wins and eight additional podiums to finish runner-up to future Super GT GT500 champion Kenta Yamashita by three points. Mardenborough felt he had enough experience by then to fight for the prominent F3 title.

For 2017, Mardenborough moved up to Super GT's top GT500 class with Nissan, joining the Calsonic-sponsored Impul team. His move to the GT500 class coincided with a downturn in form for Nissan, whose GT-R car often lagged behind its rivals from Honda and Toyota over the following years. He and teammate Hironobu Yasuda finished 15th in the 2017 GT500 standings, with a best result of fifth, but they had been in contention for victory at the penultimate round at Buriram until a slow pit stop dropped them to third and then car problems with two laps to go forced them to retire. Nissan also gave him permission to compete for the Toyota-powered Impul team in Super Formula, Japan's top-level single-seater series. With three top-eight finishes in seven races, he finished 14th overall in his only season in the series. He took pole position for the second race of the season-ending Suzuka double-header, a race in which the grid was determined by the second fastest time of each driver in a damp, red flag-affected qualifying session, but both races were cancelled due to Typhoon Lan.

Mardenborough remained at Impul for the 2018 Super GT season, now with Daiki Sasaki being his co-driver. After scoring three top-six finishes in the first four races, Mardenborough looked set to claim his first GT500 win at the Fuji 500 mile race, but a loose intercooler pipe while leading by 25 seconds forced the team out of the points. At the following race at Sugo, Mardenborough broke through for his first podium finish in GT500. He had passed the Team Kunimitsu Honda NSX-GT of Naoki Yamamoto and Jenson Button for the lead during the opening stint, but overheating issues caused by grass picked up in an off-track excursion by Sasaki limited the pair to third. Scoring no points in the final two races, the duo finished 12th in the standings.

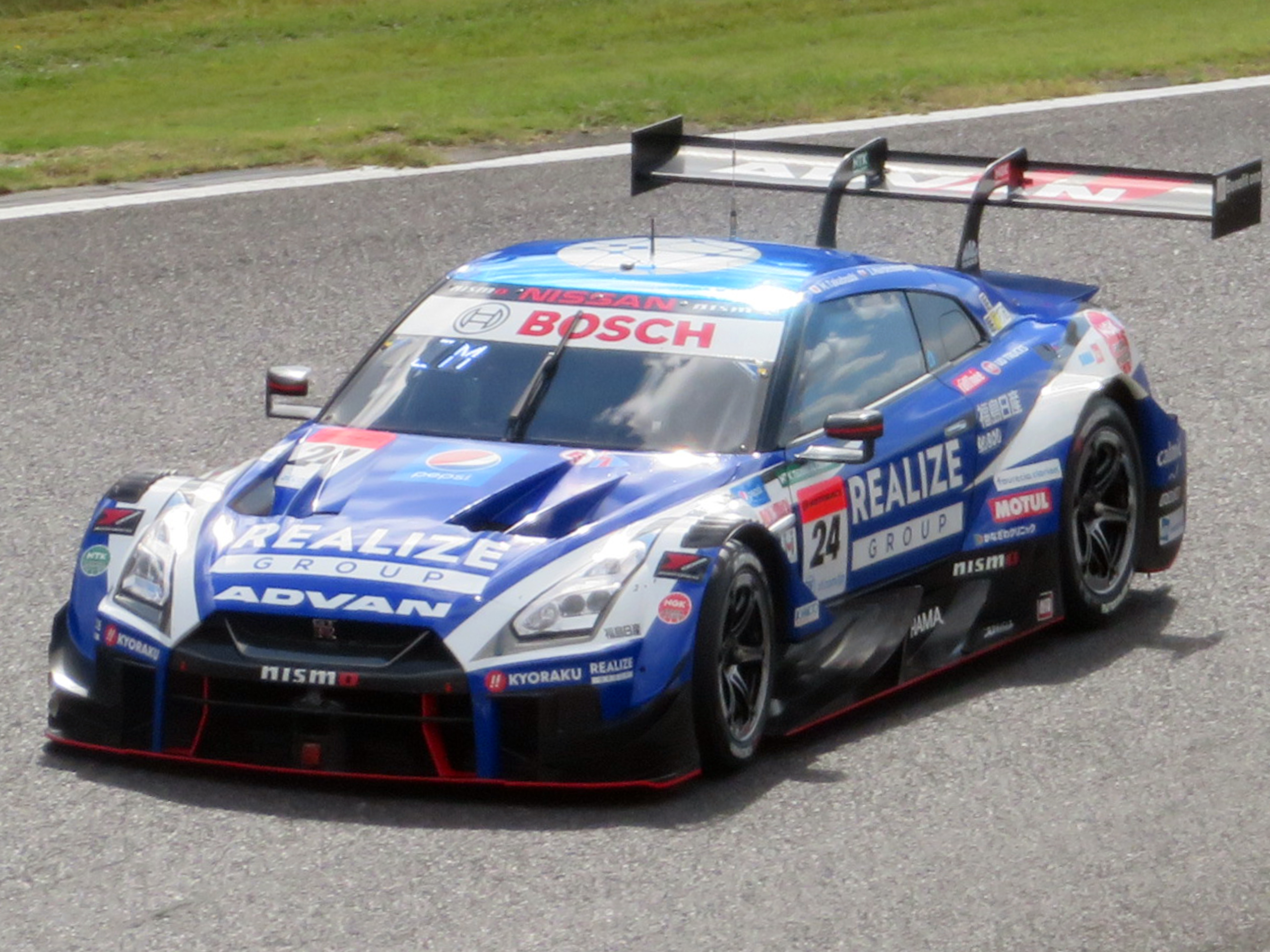
Mardenborough driving for Kondo Racing during the 2020 Super GT season

For 2019, Mardenborough was moved to the Kondo Racing team in Nissan's GT500 lineup, partnering Mitsunori Takaboshi. Unlike Impul, who used the benchmark Bridgestone tyres, Kondo Racing ran the often uncompetitive Yokohama tyres. Despite this disadvantage, Mardenborough and Takaboshi finished just half a point behind the Impul crew in the championship, with five points finishes and a best result of fourth placing them 14th overall. In 2020, they finished 19th with just four points as both the new GT-R built for the updated GT500 regulations and the Yokohama rubber proved uncompetitive. Mardenborough had qualified fourth for round five at Fuji, but a gear selector problem in the race denied the team a potential podium finish. Despite often being faster than his teammate, Mardenborough was not retained by Nissan for the 2021 season, making way for seven-time Formula 2/GP2 race winner and former Honda junior Nobuharu Matsushita.

=== Activities after 2020 ===
After leaving Nissan's GT500 lineup following the end of the 2020 season, Mardenborough was offered race seats in Super GT's GT300 class and Super Formula but these required him to bring a budget, which he was unable to do. In 2021 and 2022, he worked as a simulator and car development driver for Nissan e.dams and its customer team McLaren in Formula E. He also worked as a stunt driver and assisted in the production of the Gran Turismo film that is based on his career. In May 2023, he made a return to racing at the Fuji 24 Hours round of the Super Taikyu Series, driving Helm Motorsports' Nissan GT-R Nismo GT3. He and his crew scored pole position for the event and led significant portions of it, but ultimately finished fourth after encountering brake issues. Mardenborough contested the Silverstone 500 round of the 2024 British GT Championship with the McLaren 720S GT3 Evo of Team RJN, claiming a win in the Pro-Am class and an overall podium alongside Chris Buncombe. For 2025, Mardenborough was signed by HRT Ford Performance to drive a Ford Mustang GT3 at the GT World Challenge Europe Endurance Cup.

== Racing record ==
=== Career summary ===
Season	Series	Team	Races	Wins	Poles	F/Laps	Podiums	Points	Position
2011	GT4 European Cup	RJN Motorsport	1	0	0	0	0	0	NC
2012	British GT Championship	RJN Motorsport	10	1	1	0	3	108.5	6th
2012	Blancpain Endurance Series - Pro-Am	GT Academy Team RJN	4	0	0	0	0	?	?
2013	FIA Formula 3 European Championship	Carlin	30	0	0	0	0	12	21st
2013	British Formula 3 Championship	Carlin	12	0	0	0	1	85	6th
2013	Masters of Formula 3	Carlin	1	0	0	0	0	0	13th
2013	Toyota Racing Series	ETEC Motorsport	15	0	0	0	0	491	10th
2013	Blancpain Endurance Series - Pro-Am	Nissan GT Academy Team RJN	2	0	0	0	1	30	14th
2013	24 Hours of Le Mans - LMP2	Greaves Motorsport	1	0	0	0	1	N/A	**3rd**
2014	GP3 Series	Arden International	18	1	0	2	2	77	9th
2014	Toyota Racing Series	Giles Motorsport	15	3	1	2	7	782	**2nd**
2014	24 Hours of Le Mans - LMP2	OAK Racing	1	0	0	0	0	N/A	5th
2014	British GT Championship - GT3	Nissan GT Academy RJN Motorsport	1	0	0	0	0	0	42nd
2014	United SportsCar Championship - Prototype	Muscle Milk Pickett Racing	1	0	0	0	0	19	64th
2015	GP3 Series	Carlin	14	0	0	0	2	58	9th
2015	GP2 Series	Carlin	2	0	0	0	0	0	35th
2015	Blancpain Endurance Series - Pro-Am	Nissan GT Academy RJN Motorsport	1	0	0	0	1	18	18th
2015	FIA World Endurance Championship - LMP1	Nissan Motorsports	1	0	0	0	0	0	34th
2015	24 Hours of Le Mans - LMP1	Nissan Motorsports	1	0	0	0	0	N/A	DNF
2016	Super GT - GT300	NDDP Racing with B-MAX	8	1	0	1	2	52	4th
2016	Japanese Formula 3 Championship	B-MAX Racing Team with NDDP	17	4	6	6	11	110	**2nd**
2016	Macau Grand Prix	B-MAX Racing Team with NDDP	1	0	0	0	0	N/A	20th
2017	Super GT - GT500	Team Impul	8	0	0	1	0	17	15th
2017	Super Formula	Team Impul	7	0	1	1	0	4.5	14th
2017	Intercontinental GT Challenge	Nissan Motorsport	1	0	0	0	0	6	13th
2017	24H Series - SP3-GT4	Nissan GT Academy Team RJN	1	0	0	1	0	16	8th
2018	Super GT - GT500	Team Impul	8	0	0	0	1	29	12th
2018	Blancpain GT Series Endurance Cup	GT SPORT MOTUL Team RJN	1	0	0	0	0	0	NC
2018–19	Formula E	Nissan e.dams	Test driver						
2019	Super GT - GT500	Kondō Racing	8	0	0	0	0	17	14th
2019–20	Formula E	Nissan e.dams	Simulator driver						
2020	Super GT - GT500	Kondō Racing	8	0	0	0	0	4	19th
2020–21	Formula E	Nissan e.dams	Simulator driver						
2021–22	Formula E	Nissan e.dams	Simulator driver						
2023	Super Taikyu - ST-X	HELM Motorsports	1	0	1	0	0	117‡	**3rd‡**
2024	British GT Championship - GT3	Team RJN	1	0	0	0	1	0	NC†
2024	GT World Challenge Europe Endurance Cup	Team RJN	1	0	0	0	0	0	NC
2025	GT World Challenge Europe Endurance Cup	HRT Ford Performance	5	0	0	0	0	8	20th
2025	Nürburgring Langstrecken-Serie - SP9	HRT Ford Performance	1	0	0	0	1	4	NC
2025	Nürburgring Langstrecken-Serie - V5		2	0	0	0	2	6	NC

^{‡} Team standings. ^{†} As Mardenborough was a guest driver, he was ineligible to score points. * Season still in progress.

=== Complete British GT Championship results ===
Year	Team	Car	Class	1	2	3	4	5	6	7	8	9	10	DC	Points
2012	RJN Motorsport	Nissan GT-R Nismo GT3	GT3	OUL; 1; 5	OUL; 2; 11	**NUR**; **1**; 3	NUR; 2; 5	ROC; 1; 5	BRH; 1; 1	SNE; 1 Ret	SNE; 2; 3	SIL; 1; 8	DON; 1; 16	6th	108.5
2014	Nissan GT Academy RJN Motorsport	Nissan GT-R Nismo GT3	GT3	OUL; 1	OUL; 2	ROC; 1	SIL; 1	SNE; 1	SNE; 2	SPA; 1	SPA; 2	BRH; 1; 11	DON; 1	42nd	0
2024	Team RJN	McLaren 720S GT3 Evo	GT3	OUL; 1	OUL; 2	SIL; 1; 3	DON; 1	SPA; 1	SNE; 1	SNE; 2	DON; 1	BRH; 1		NC†	0†

^{†} As Mardenborough was a guest driver, he was ineligible to score points.

=== Complete FIA Formula 3 European Championship results ===
(key)

Year	Entrant	Engine	1	2	3	4	5	6	7	8	9	10	11	12	13	14	15	16	17	18	19	20	21	22	23	24	25	26	27	28	29	30	Pos.	Points
2013	Carlin	Volkswagen	MNZ; 1 Ret	MNZ; 2; 11	MNZ; 3; 14	SIL; 1; 16	SIL; 2 DNS	SIL; 3; 8	HOC; 1; 16	HOC; 2 Ret	HOC; 3; 22	BRH; 1; 13	BRH; 2; 10	BRH; 3 Ret	RBR; 1; 13	RBR; 2; 21	RBR; 3 Ret	NOR; 1; 7	NOR; 2; 27	NOR; 3; 12	NÜR; 1; 15	NÜR; 2 Ret	NÜR; 3; 11	ZAN; 1; 16	ZAN; 2; 23†	ZAN; 3; 14	VAL; 1; 18	VAL; 2 Ret	VAL; 3; 11	HOC; 1; 16	HOC; 2; 18	HOC; 3; 11	21st	12

=== 24 Hours of Le Mans results ===
Year	Team	Co-Drivers	Car	Class	Laps	Pos.	Class Pos.
2013	(United Kingdom) Greaves Motorsport	(Germany) Michael Krumm (Spain) Lucas Ordóñez	Zytek Z11SN-Nissan	LMP2	327	9th	**3rd**
2014	(France) OAK Racing	(United Kingdom) Alex Brundle (Russia) Mark Shulzhitskiy	Ligier JS P2-Nissan	LMP2	354	9th	5th
2015	(Japan) Nissan Motorsports	(France) Olivier Pla (United Kingdom) Max Chilton	Nissan GT-R LM Nismo	LMP1	234	DNF	DNF

=== Complete GP3 Series results ===
(key) (Races in bold indicate pole position) (Races in italics indicate fastest lap)

Year	Entrant	1	2	3	4	5	6	7	8	9	10	11	12	13	14	15	16	17	18	Pos.	Points
2014	Arden International	CAT; FEA; 14	CAT; SPR; 14	RBR; FEA; 11	RBR; SPR; Ret	SIL; FEA; 9	SIL; SPR; 15	HOC; FEA; 8	HOC; SPR; 1	HUN; FEA; 7	HUN; SPR; 3	SPA; FEA; 4	SPA; SPR; 4	MNZ; FEA; 11	MNZ; SPR; Ret	SOC; FEA; 6	SOC; SPR; 4	YMC; FEA; 13	YMC; SPR; Ret	9th	77
2015	Carlin	CAT; FEA; 4	CAT; SPR; 3	RBR; FEA; 5	RBR; SPR; 13	SIL; FEA; 17	SIL; SPR; 15	HUN; FEA; Ret	HUN; SPR; 17	SPA; FEA; Ret	SPA; SPR; 12	MNZ; FEA	MNZ; SPR	SOC; FEA; 5	SOC; SPR; 3	BHR; FEA; 7	BHR; SPR; Ret	YMC; FEA	YMC; SPR	9th	58

=== Complete IMSA SportsCar Championship results ===
(key) (Races in bold indicate pole position) (Races in italics indicate fastest lap)

Year	Team	Class	Make	Engine	1	2	3	4	5	6	7	8	9	10	11	Pos.	Pts	Ref
2014	Muscle Milk Pickett Racing	P	Oreca 03	Nissan VK45DE 4.5 L V8	DAY	SEB; 13	LBH	LAG	DET	WGL	MOS	IMS	ROA	COA	PET	51st	19	

=== Complete FIA World Endurance Championship results ===
Year	Entrant	Class	Chassis	Engine	1	2	3	4	5	6	7	8	Rank	Points
2015	Nissan Motorsports	LMP1	Nissan GT-R LM Nismo	Nissan VRX30A 3.0 L Turbo V6	SIL	SPA	LMS; Ret	NÜR	COA	FUJ	SHA	BHR	34th	0

=== Complete GP2 Series results ===
(key) (Races in bold indicate pole position) (Races in italics indicate fastest lap)

Year	Entrant	1	2	3	4	5	6	7	8	9	10	11	12	13	14	15	16	17	18	19	20	21	22	DC	Points
2015	Carlin	BHR; FEA	BHR; SPR	CAT; FEA	CAT; SPR	MON; FEA	MON; SPR	RBR; FEA	RBR; SPR	SIL; FEA	SIL; SPR	HUN; FEA	HUN; SPR	SPA; FEA	SPA; SPR	MNZ; FEA; 19	MNZ; SPR; 20	SOC; FEA	SOC; SPR	BHR; FEA	BHR; SPR	YMC; FEA	YMC; SPR	35th	0

=== Complete Macau Grand Prix results ===
Year	Team	Car	Qualifying	Quali Race	Main race
2016	(United Kingdom) B-Max Racing Team	Dallara F312	25th	20th	20th

=== Complete Japanese Formula 3 Championship results ===
(key) (Races in bold indicate pole position) (Races in italics indicate fastest lap)

Year	Team	Engine	1	2	3	4	5	6	7	8	9	10	11	12	13	14	15	16	17	DC	Points
2016	B-Max Racing Team with NDDP	Volkswagen	SUZ; 2	SUZ; 3	**FUJ**; 2	FUJ; 4	**OKA**; 8	**OKA**; 1	SUZ; 10	SUZ; 3	**FUJ**; 1	**FUJ**; 2	MOT; 1	**MOT**; 1	OKA; 4	OKA; 8	SUG; 2	SUG; 2	SUG; 2	**2nd**	**110**

=== Complete Super GT results ===
(key) (Races in bold indicate pole position) (Races in italics indicate fastest lap)

Year	Team	Car	Class	1	2	3	4	5	6	7	8	DC	Points
2016	NDDP Racing	Nissan GT-R GT3	GT300	OKA; 10	FUJ; 1	SUG; 5	FUJ; 6	SUZ; 10	CHA; 2	MOT; 13	MOT; 6	4th	52
2017	Team Impul	Nissan GT-R	GT500	OKA; 8	FUJ; 14	AUT; 7	SUG; 11	FUJ; 5	SUZ; 11	CHA; 14	MOT; 7	15th	17
2018	Team Impul	Nissan GT-R	GT500	OKA; 14	FUJ; 6	SUZ; 4	CHA; 6	FUJ; 12	SUG; 3	AUT; 11	MOT; 11	12th	29
2019	Kondō Racing	Nissan GT-R	GT500	OKA; 5‡	FUJ; 14	SUZ; 8	CHA; 4	FUJ; Ret	AUT; 9	SUG; 15	MOT; 10	14th	17
2020	Kondō Racing	Nissan GT-R	GT500	FUJ; 10	FUJ; 12	SUZ; 11	MOT; 13	FUJ; 14	SUZ; 8	MOT; 14	FUJ; 13	19th	4

^{‡} Half points awarded as less than 75% of race distance was completed.

=== Complete Super Formula Results ===
(key) (Races in bold indicate pole position) (Races in italics indicate fastest lap)

Year	Entrant	Engine	1	2	3	4	5	6	7	8	9	DC	Points
2017	Itochu Enex Team Impul	Toyota	SUZ; 18	OKA; 6	OKA; 17	FUJ; 8	MOT; 14	AUT; 8	SUG; 9	SUZ; C	**SUZ**; C	14th	4.5
