= GT Academy =

Television programme

Tournament information
- Sport: Gran Turismo
- Established: 2008
- Defunct: n/a
- Number of tournaments: 4
- Teams: Nissan GT

GT Academy (also known as Nissan PlayStation GT Academy and NISMO PlayStation GT Academy as part of the Nissan partnership) was a television programme that was produced by Grand Central Entertainment and funded by Nissan and Sony Interactive Entertainment from 2008 to 2016. GT Academy provided skilled Gran Turismo players an opportunity to earn a real-life professional racing career with Nissan.

== History ==
GT Academy was conceived by Darren Cox, former Nissan Europe executive, in 2006 to help Sony PlayStation racing gamers become professional racing drivers. A small event was held in 2006 in a partnership with Sony, where participants competed in the Gran Turismo game and on an actual track for a Nissan 350Z prize. Cox saw the speed of the gamers in real cars and his idea of 'Gamer to Racer' was born.

In 2008, Darren Cox's concept materialized with the founding of Nissan GT Academy, a joint venture between Sony and Nissan, which took its name from the well-known Gran Turismo video game series. In the same year, inaugural GT Academy competition took place, with Spain's Lucas Ordóñez claiming victory. Following a commendable performance at the 2009 Dubai 24 Hours, Nissan enlisted Ordóñez for its works racing team. Cox is portrayed by Orlando Bloom in a film named after the game Gran Turismo, released in 2023.

From 2010 to 2016, the Nissan PlayStation GT Academy program saw twenty-one additional winners, many of whom had success on track including Championship wins, Podiums and international races, such as the 2015 Bathurst 12 Hours in Australia.

GT Academy continued in 2010, expanding to 17 countries, including New Zealand and Australia. A GT Academy-oriented DLC for Gran Turismo 5 was released to the public, and was the prerequisite required for participants to qualify for the programme. The DLC was downloaded by participants more than 1.3 million times during its active period. In 2011, the competition expanded to the United States, where Bryan Heitkotter became the first GT Academy Winner outside of Europe. The European competition in 2011 began at the 24 Hours of Le Mans in Le Mans, France, as inaugural GT Academy Winner Lucas Ordoñez made his Le Mans race debut. 2012 saw the beginning of live events, offering a way into GT Academy for those without access to a PlayStation 3 console or Gran Turismo game.

In 2013, GT Academy included competitions in Europe, the United States, Germany, Russia, the Middle East and South Africa, each entering the competition for the first time on Gran Turismo 6. In 2014, a new International competition was introduced, broadening GT Academy again to Australia and the Middle East, and for the first time to India, Mexico, and Thailand. The sixth season in 2014 grew to include separate competitions for Europe (France, Italy, United Kingdom, Spain, Portugal, Belgium, Netherlands, Luxembourg, Russia, Sweden, Poland, and Czech Republic), Germany, North America (United States and Canada) and an International group (Australia, India, Middle East, Mexico and Thailand). In the 2015 Dubai 24 Hour race, four new GT Academy winners finished second in the GT3 Pro-Am class and fifth overall out of 95 cars, just months after winning their respective GT Academy competitions. The round in Malaysia was planned in 2015, together with new countries such as Japan and Indonesia.

== Format ==
Developed for television by Executive Producers Andrew Hill and Rabin Mukerjea, the contest comprised different phases. Players began with virtual racing on Polyphony Digital's Gran Turismo games and progressed to National Finals before the winners of each region competed for real in actual Nissan cars at Race Camp. This experience involved week-long testing and challenges that also involved elimination. Throughout all seasons of the programme, 'Race Camp' was based at Silverstone Circuit in the United Kingdom where the winner was crowned to whoever demonstrated the highest potential to transition from Gran Turismo gamer to a real racer. Nissan's Driver Development Program was included to try and assist GT Academy winners to develop the skills needed to compete against those with years of car racing experience. Over six seasons, more than five million people had entered GT Academy via PlayStation 3. GT Academy winners who qualified to compete in the international race or series were also considered for a potential future racing career with Nissan as a Nismo Athlete.

=== Entrance Requirements ===
According to the GT Academy site on the Gran Turismo website, GT Academy required entrants to be over the age of 18 and hold a valid driver's license, and never have a racing license equivalent to Motor Sport Association UK A class license or higher. Any contestant who made it to Race Camp in any of the previous GT Academy competitions was generally restricted to the Online Qualification stage of the GT Academy.

=== Phase One: Qualification ===
Players qualified for GT Academy through Gran Turismo 6 on PlayStation 3. Gamers in the participating territories signed in with their PSN (PlayStation Network) ID and entered the competition via a free automatic update on the game. They then had to compete against each other to set the fastest lap time possible in four consecutive rounds, each with a different track and Nissan vehicle, before the final round determined whether or not the player qualified for the next phase of GT Academy.

Nissan and PlayStation hosted Live Events for the qualifying rounds in the participating territories. These events allowed those who did not have a PlayStation 3 or copy of Gran Turismo 6 to enter the competition on gaming pods set up at public venues or events, such as motor shows and gaming conventions. The fastest gamers at the Live Events were granted a spot at the National Finals.

=== Phase Two: National Finals ===
National Finals identified which gamers had real-life racing potential and determined the top selection of competitors who would progress to the next phase of GT Academy. In addition to onsite Gran Turismo 6 time trials, competitors were also tested on real driving in Nissan vehicles. Additionally, players underwent a personality test, and regular assessments of physical fitness, vision and general health.

=== Phase Three: Race Camp ===
Winners from the National Finals received a place at Race Camp, a week-long selection process that determined the GT Academy Winner. Headquartered at Stowe Circuit in the premises of Silverstone Circuit, UK, Race Camp assessed competitors both on and off the real-world track. Competitors were split into regional groups where they competed against each other and also against other territories. They were allocated a judge - each with a professional background in auto racing – responsible for mentoring and eliminating all but one of their group based on various eliminatory challenges. A head judge also oversaw the eliminations and had the ultimate responsibility of naming the GT Academy Winner. On the last day, the remaining competitors - one from each group – competed in a final race against each other, where the results of the race, along with their development over Race Camp, were taken into account, so as for the judges to determine the winner.

All activities took place within Silverstone Circuit and a number of other neighbouring venues to accommodate numerous types of challenges. On the track, these included pit stop challenge, gymkhana, dogfight, stock car racing, traffic challenge, and more, with competitors driving in buggies, single seaters, and Caterham cars, as well as actual Nissan cars such as the 370Z, Juke, GT-R, Leaf, and Pulsar. Off-track challenges typically involved an assault course, triathlon, laser challenge, written tests, interviews and more.

=== Phase Four: Driver Development Program ===
GT Academy Winners were invited to take part in Nissan's Driver Development Programme. Headquartered at Silverstone Circuit, UK, the Driver Development Program consisted of two-to-four months of training and racing at club and national level with the GT Academy Nissan RJN Motorsport Team in order for drivers to qualify for an International Racing License, a process that normally takes three years. This was a requirement to compete at an international endurance race – the final prize for the majority of the GT Academy Winners – which for most had been the Dubai 24 Hours. rFactor 2 is also used for the training.

RJN Motorsport was the racing team for GT Academy Winners for the Driver Development Programme for the entirety of GT Academy, starting from when inaugural winner Lucas Ordoñez upgraded his National B racing license to an International C racing licence after six weekends of racing.

In addition to building fitness, racing experience and theory, the Driver Development Programme also included training in the NISMO Lab, where technological equipment included Nissan's In-Body machine, which analysed body composition; a brainwave monitor, which trained the mind to simultaneously focus and relax; a BATAK console to improve peripheral vision and reaction times; a racing simulator which allowed simulated racing practice on any track in the world; a biometric harness and the JukeRide which measured biometric and telemetry data respectively.

== Competitions ==
For 2015, there were three GT Academy competitions based on region. These were:

- GT Academy Europe: France, Italy, Germany, UK, Iberia (Spain, Portugal), Benelux (Belgium, Netherlands) and CEE (Poland, Czech Republic, Hungary)
- GT Academy Asia: Japan, India, Thailand, Philippines, Indonesia
- GT Academy International: USA, Australia, Mexico, Egypt, Morocco, Algeria, Turkey

== Graduates ==
GT Academy has turned 23 video gamers out of approximately 5 million tested to racing drivers over the period, and NISMO Athletes have competed at international car racing competitions since 2009.

At the 24 Hours of Le Mans, Lucas Ordoñez finished second in the LM P2 category in 2011, and in 2013 he finished third alongside Jann Mardenborough (2011 European winner). In 2014, Wolfgang Reip recorded the first-ever all-electric lap of the Le Mans circuit, driving the Nissan ZEOD RC.

In the Blancpain Endurance Series, Jordan Tresson was winner of the GT4 class in 2011. In 2013, the Pro-Am cup was won by Lucas Ordoñez, while the Pro-Am team cup was won by Nissan GT Academy Team RJN, which included Jann Mardenborough, Wolfgang Reip (2012 European winner), Mark Shulzhitskiy (2012 Russia winner), Peter Pyzera (2012 Germany winner) and Steve Doherty (2012 USA winner). In 2015, Wolfgang Reip became a joint Drivers' Championship Pro Cup winner.

GT Academy Winners have also competed in the Dubai 24 Hours, FIA GT Series, FIA World Endurance Championship, British GT Championship, FIA Formula 3 European Championships, British Formula Three Championship, TRS Single-Seater Series, IMSA Continental Tire Sports Car Challenge, SCCA Solo National Championship and the United SportsCar Championship. In 2012, Lucas Ordoñez competed at the Petit Le Mans in the Nissan DeltaWing race car, and in 2014 began racing in the Super GT Series, class GT300, with NDDP Racing. In the same year, Jann Mardenborough began racing in the GP3 Series with Arden International, and at Motorland Aragon raced for the first time in a Formula Renault 3.5 test. In September 2014, Nissan announced that former US GT Academy Winners and finalists would be considered for Nissan's new LM P1 Le Mans 24 Hours and FIA World Endurance Championship Team.

On 8 February 2015, GT Academy graduates Wolfgang Reip (2012) and Florian Strauss (2013) teamed with Super GT driver Katsumasa Chiyo to compete in the Bathurst 12 Hour at the famous Mount Panorama Circuit in Australia. Driving a Nissan GT-R Nismo GT3 for the NISMO Athlete Global Team in the Class AA, they completed 269 laps to claim the overall race win.

Mardenborough's achievements since winning GT Academy saw him named as one of the 50 most marketable athletes in the world by Sports Pro Media in 2015.

In 2016, Wolfgang Reip was the first and only graduate to sign a professional contract with another manufacturer than Nissan as he signed a contract with Bentley Motorsport for the Blancpain Endurance Series Cup. Nicolas Hammann became the first GT Academy graduate to compete in stock car racing (both Gran Turismo 5 and Gran Turismo 6 had featured NASCAR Cup Series cars), where he made two starts (all on road courses) for Mike Harmon Racing in the NASCAR Xfinity Series. Hammann made further road course starts in the Xfinity Series in 2017 and 2019.

Season	Driver	Region	Source
2008	(Spain) Lucas Ordóñez (Germany) Lars Schlömer	Europe	
2010	(France) Jordan Tresson	Europe	
2011	(United Kingdom) Jann Mardenborough	Europe	
2011	(United States) Bryan Heitkotter	USA	
2012	(Belgium) Wolfgang Reip	Europe	
2012	(United States) Steve Doherty	USA	
2012	(Germany) Peter Pyzera	Germany	
2012	(Russia) Mark Shulzhitskiy	Russia	
2013	(South Africa) Ashley Oldfield	Africa	
2013	(Portugal) Miguel Faisca	Europe	
2013	(United States) Nick McMillen	USA	
2013	(Germany) Florian Strauss	Germany	
2013	(Russia) Stanislav Aksenov	Russia	
2013	(Qatar) Salman Al Khater	Middle East	
2014	(France) Gaëtan Paletou	Europe	
2014	(United States) Nicolas Hammann	USA	
2014	(Germany) Marc Gassner	Germany	
2014	(Mexico) Ricardo Sanchez	International	
2014	(Saudi Arabia) Ahmed Bin Khanen	Middle East	
2015	(France) Romain Sarazin	Europe	
2015	(Australia) Matthew Simmons	International	
2015	(Philippines) Jose Gerard Policarpio	Asia	
2016	(Mexico) Johnny Guindi Hamui	International	

== Impact ==
A fictionalized account of the GT Academy driving academy and gamer-driver Mardenborough was made into the 2023 dramatic biopic film Gran Turismo.

=== Recognition ===
- 2013 AUTOSPORT Awards, Pioneering and Innovation Award
- 2012 Cannes Lions International Festival of Creativity, Bronze Lion, Best Use of Branded Content
- 2011 Cannes Lions International Festival of Creativity, Gold Lion, Best Use of Branded Content
- 2011 ‘Campaign’ magazine Media Awards, Best Transport Campaign
- 2011 ‘Campaign’ magazine Media Awards, Best Media and Entertainment Campaign
- 2011 Media Week Awards, Best International Campaign

== See also ==
- Category:GT Academy participants
- Gran Turismo (film), 2023 drama film
- Gran Turismo (series), videogame series
