= Lucas Ordóñez =

Spanish racing driver

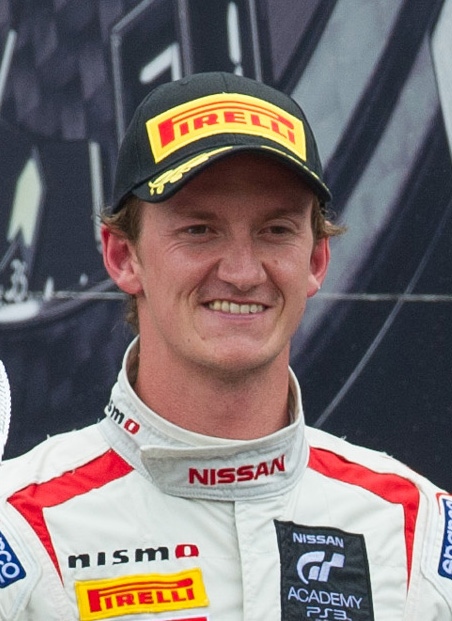
- Ordóñez in 2013
- Nationality: (Spain) Spanish
- Full name: Lucas Ordóñez Martín-Esperanza
- Born: May 1, 1985 (age 41)
- Categorisation: FIA Silver (until 2012); FIA Gold (2013–)
24 Hours of Le Mans career
- Years: 2011–2015
- Teams: Signatech Nissan, Greaves Motorsport
- Best finish: 9th (2011)
- Class wins: 0

Lucas Ordóñez Martín-Esperanza (born May 1, 1985) is a Spanish former racecar driver, who entered professional racing by winning a spot in a PlayStation 3 Gran Turismo competition. Racing for Nissan in the 2009 GT4 European Cup season, he secured a podium finish in his first event. Two race wins towards the end of the season secured him joint second place overall.

In 2011, Ordóñez and his team came in second in their class in the 24 Hours of Le Mans.

Ordóñez began 2012 by taking the role of lead driver in Nissan's 'all-gamer car' at the Dubai 24 Hours. The team finished on the podium. He competed in the European Le Mans Series and Le Mans 24 Hours for Greaves Motorsport.

For the 2012 24 Hours Nürburgring race, driving the No. 123 car with Kazunori Yamauchi, Ordóñez finished first in the SP 8T class, and 30th overall.

== Racing record ==
=== 24 Hours of Le Mans results ===
Year	Team	Co-Drivers	Car	Class	Laps	Pos.	Class Pos.
2011	(France) Signatech-Nissan	(France) Soheil Ayari (France) Franck Mailleux	Oreca 03-Nissan	LMP2	320	9th	**2nd**
2012	(United Kingdom) Greaves Motorsport	(United Kingdom) Alex Brundle (United Kingdom) Martin Brundle	Zytek Z11SN-Nissan	LMP2	340	15th	8th
2013	(United Kingdom) Greaves Motorsport	(Germany) Michael Krumm (United Kingdom) Jann Mardenborough	Zytek Z11SN-Nissan	LMP2	327	9th	**3rd**
2014	(Japan) Nissan Motorsports Global	(Belgium) Wolfgang Reip (Japan) Satoshi Motoyama	Nissan ZEOD RC	UNC	5	DNF	DNF
2015	(Japan) Nissan Motorsports	(Japan) Tsugio Matsuda (Russia) Mark Shulzhitskiy	Nissan GT-R LM Nismo	LMP1	115	DNF	DNF

=== FIA GT Series results ===
Year	Class	Team	Car	1	2	3	4	5	6	7	8	9	10	11	12	Pos.	Points
2013	Pro-Am	Nissan GT Academy Team RJN	Nissan	NOG; QR; 19	NOG; CR; 7	ZOL; QR; 18	ZOL; CR; Ret	ZAN; QR; 13	ZAN; QR; 8	SVK; QR	SVK; CR	NAV; QR; 13	NAV; CR; 11	TBA; QR	TBA; CR	10th	49

* Season still in progress.

=== Complete Super GT results ===
(key) (Races in bold indicate pole position) (Races in italics indicate fastest lap)

Year	Team	Car	Class	1	2	3	4	5	6	7	8	9	DC	Pts
2013	NDDP Racing	Nissan GT-R GT3	GT300	OKA	FUJ	SEP	SUG	SUZ; 9	FUJ	FUJ	AUT	MOT	27th	3
2014	NDDP Racing with B-MAX	Nissan GT-R GT3	GT300	OKA; 4	**FUJ**; 5	AUT; 4	SUG; 9	FUJ; 10	SUZ; 19	BUR; 1	MOT; 8		4th	48
2015	Kondo Racing	Nissan GT-R GT500	GT500	OKA; 11	FUJ; 11	BUR; Ret	FUJ	SUZ	SUG	AUT	MOT		NC	0
