= Romain Dumas =

French racing driver (born 1977)

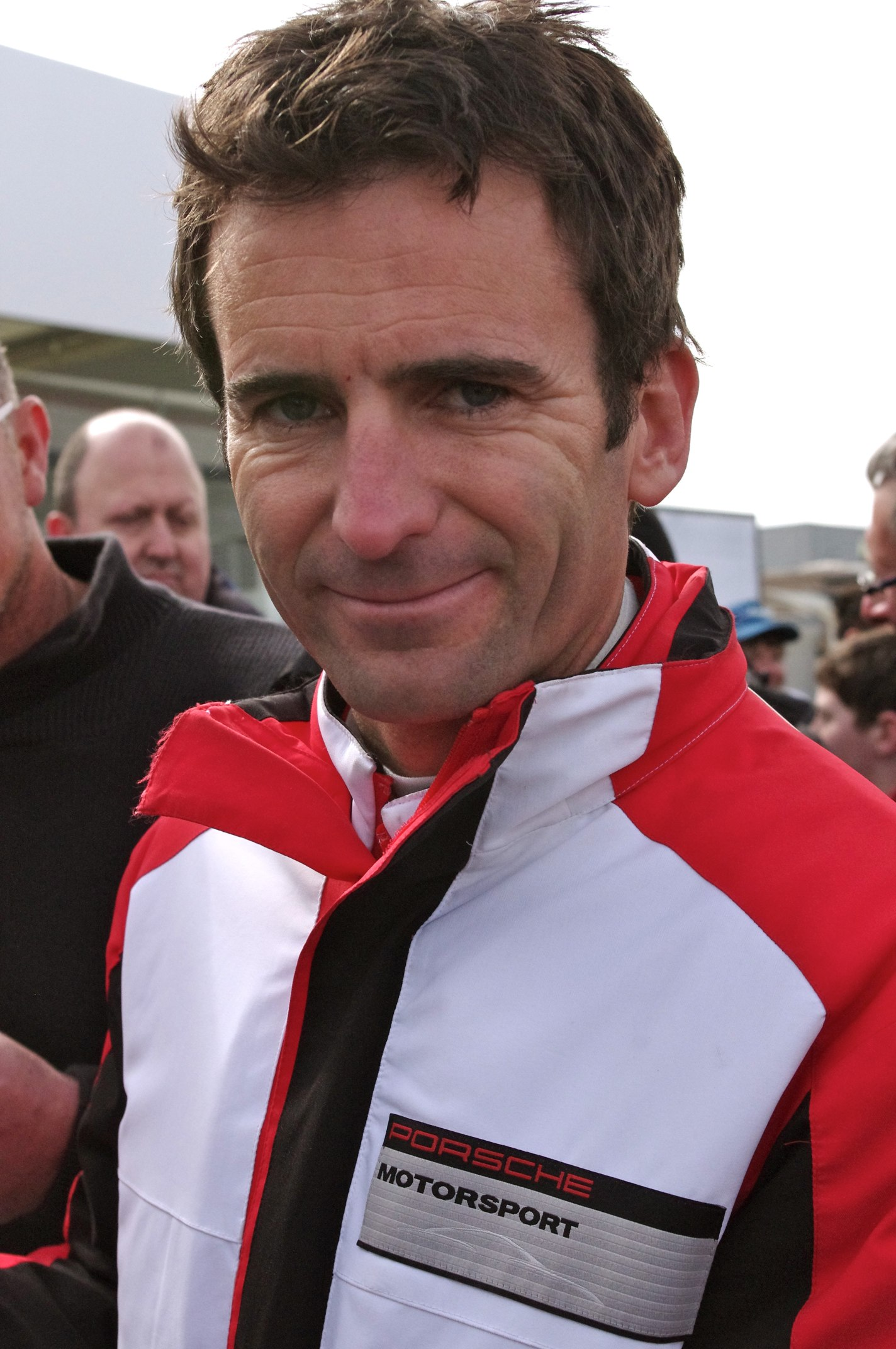
- Dumas in 2014
- Nationality: (France) French
- Born: 14 December 1977 (age 48) Alès, France
- Categorisation: FIA Platinum
24 Hours of Le Mans career
- Years: 2001–
- Teams: Freisinger Motorsport, IMSA Performance, Pescarolo Sport, Audi Sport Team Joest, Porsche Motorsport, Glickenhaus
- Best finish: 1st (2010, 2016)
- Class wins: 3 (2010, 2013, 2016)

Romain Dumas (born 14 December 1977) is a French racing driver in endurance racing, GT and sport-prototype. He has won the greatest races of the discipline, such as the 24 Hours of Le Mans, the 24 Hours of Spa, the Nürburgring 24 Hours, and the 12 Hours of Sebring. He has been one of Porsche's factory drivers since 2004. He's also been contracted to Audi from 2009 to 2012, Volkswagen from 2017 to 2019, and Ford Performance since 2022, setting records in mostly electric prototypes at Pikes Peak and other places.

== Biography ==
Born in Alès, Dumas started karting in 1992, in 1996 he competed in the French Formula Renault Championship. In 1998, he joined the French Formula 3 Championship.

Dumas tested a Formula 3000 car for Oreca in 1999, a Renault F1 in 2002, and in 2004 a Conquest Racing Champ Car, but he did not proceed to race in these formulas. Two years after his F3000 test, though, he competed in Euro Formula 3000, in 2001 and 2002.

From 2001 to 2023, Dumas has participated in every 24 Hours of Le Mans race, and from 2002 to 2013 he competed in American Le Mans Series. He was a Porsche factory driver for Penske Racing, and also driven in the FIA GT Championship.

In 2007, Dumas won first overall in the 24 Hours Nürburgring, 1st American Le Mans Series (LMP2 Class — Penske Porsche RS Spyder with eight wins, four pole positions), 3rd Le Mans 24 Hours (LMP1 Class — Pescarolo Sport, 5th 1000 km Valencia LMS (LMP1 Class — Pescarolo Sport ), four races VLN championship with Manthey Racing (two wins, one pole position), 18th Daytona 24H (12th DP)

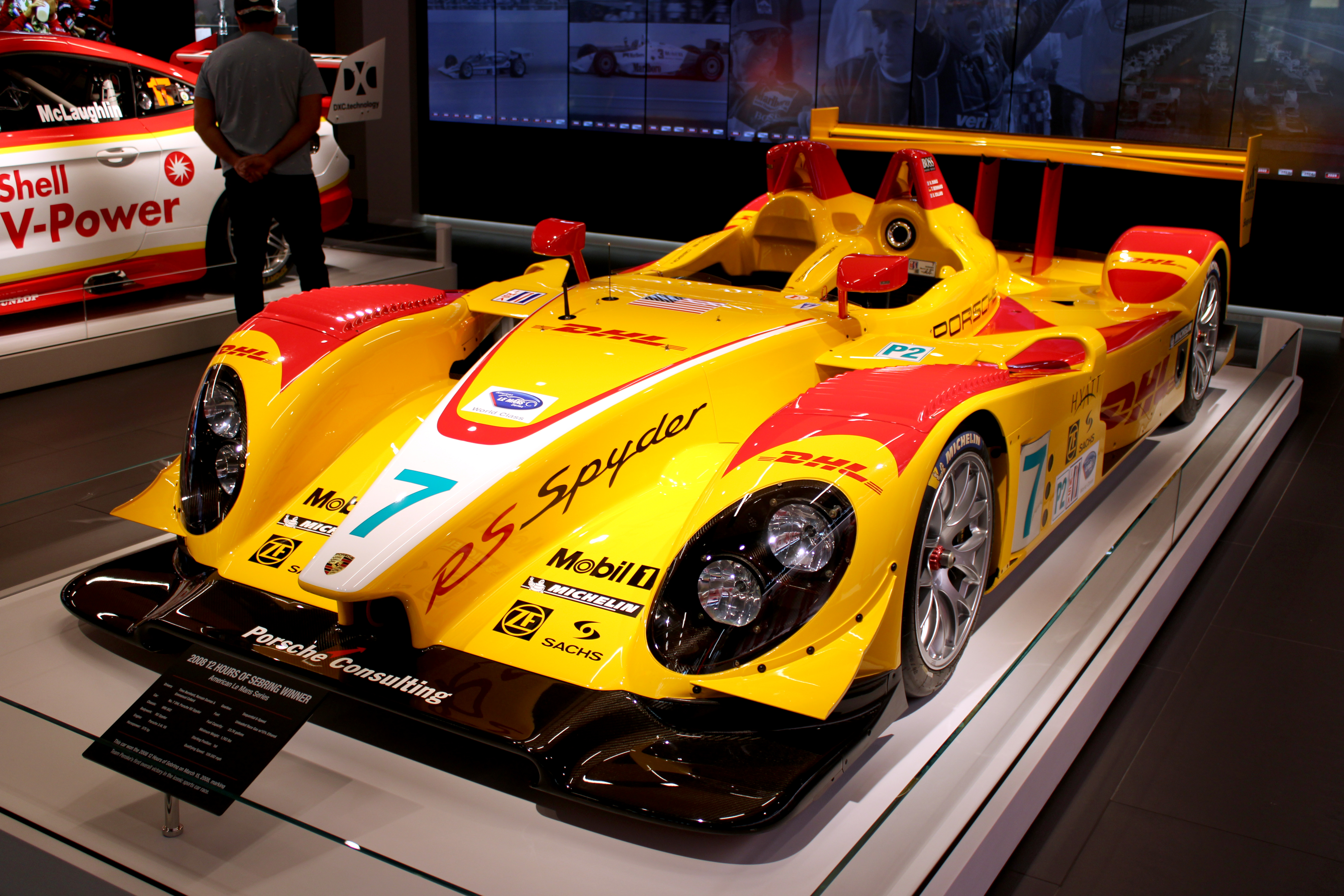
Romain Dumas' 2008 Porsche RS Spyder on display at the Indianapolis Motor Speedway Museum

Dumas started 2008 with the P2 class and overall win at the 2008 12 Hours of Sebring in the Penske Porsche RS Spyder.

Dumas was invited to test an Indycar for Team Penske at the end of the 2008 season, at Sonoma Raceway (named Infineon Raceway at the time).

As of 2009, Roger Penske lost sponsorship for the sports car program, Dumas and Timo Bernhard raced on loan to the Audi Sport Team Joest, finishing 17 overall and 13 in class in the 2009 24 Hours of Le Mans.

Dumas, together with Timo Bernhard and Mike Rockenfeller won the 2010 24 Hours of Le Mans in an Audi R15 TDI plus. He also won the 2010 24 Hours of Spa in a Porsche 911 GT3 RSR. Dumas also won with partner Klaus Graf in the CytoSport Porsche RS Spyder at the ALMS event at Mosport.

Dumas developed and drove the Porsche 919 Hybrid in the FIA World Endurance Championship in 2014.

In 2014, Dumas won the Pikes Peak International Hill Climb in a Norma M20 "RD Limited" prototype developed specifically for the event.

In 2015, Dumas raced a Porsche 997 GT3 Cup Car in the RGT class of the WRC Monte Carlo Rally, placing second behind class winner François Delecour. Later he claimed a class win at the Rallye Deutschland.

Dumas continued as a Porsche LMP1 works driver for the 2016 FIA WEC season. Dumas and teammates Neel Jani and Marc Lieb achieved victory at the 6 Hours of Silverstone (after the original winners were excluded for a technical infraction) and the 24 Hours of Le Mans en route to winning the driver's championship. A week after winning the 24 Hours of Le Mans, Dumas claimed victory at the Pikes Peak International Hill Climb with a Norma prototype, earning his second overall win at the event.

In 2017, Dumas did not return as a Porsche LMP1 works driver. He earned a third overall victory at the Pikes Peak International Hill Climb, again with a Norma prototype.

In 2018, Dumas won the Pikes Peak International Hill Climb again, driving the Volkswagen I.D. R and setting a new overall record of 7:57.148, with an average speed of 150.9 km/h. He was interviewed in his house in Geneva about training methods, which include using an old Arai helmet modified for neck weight training.

In 2019, Dumas set a new lap record for an electric vehicle at the Nürburgring Nordschleife, completing the circuit in 6:05.336 driving the Volkswagen ID R. The same year, he set a lap record at the Goodwood Festival of Speed, completing the hill climb in 0:39.90 driving the Volkswagen I.D. R, beating Nick Heidfeld in the McLaren MP4/13 Formula One car. In September, Dumas and the Volkswagen I.D. R set the official benchmark for hill climbing the Tianmen Mountain, completing the 10,906 metres (35,781 ft) Shan Big Gate Road in 07:38.585.

In 2021, Dumas took another Time Attack class win at the Pikes Peak International Hill Climb, with the Porsche 911 GT2 RS Clubsport of Champion Racing.

In 2023, Dumas drove the Ford SuperVan 4.2 at the Pikes Peak International Hill Climb, finishing 1st in the division (Pikes Peak Open) and 2nd overall, with a time of 8:47.682. He also set the lap record at the Mount Panorama Circuit in 2024 with the SuperVan, setting a time of 1:56.3247.

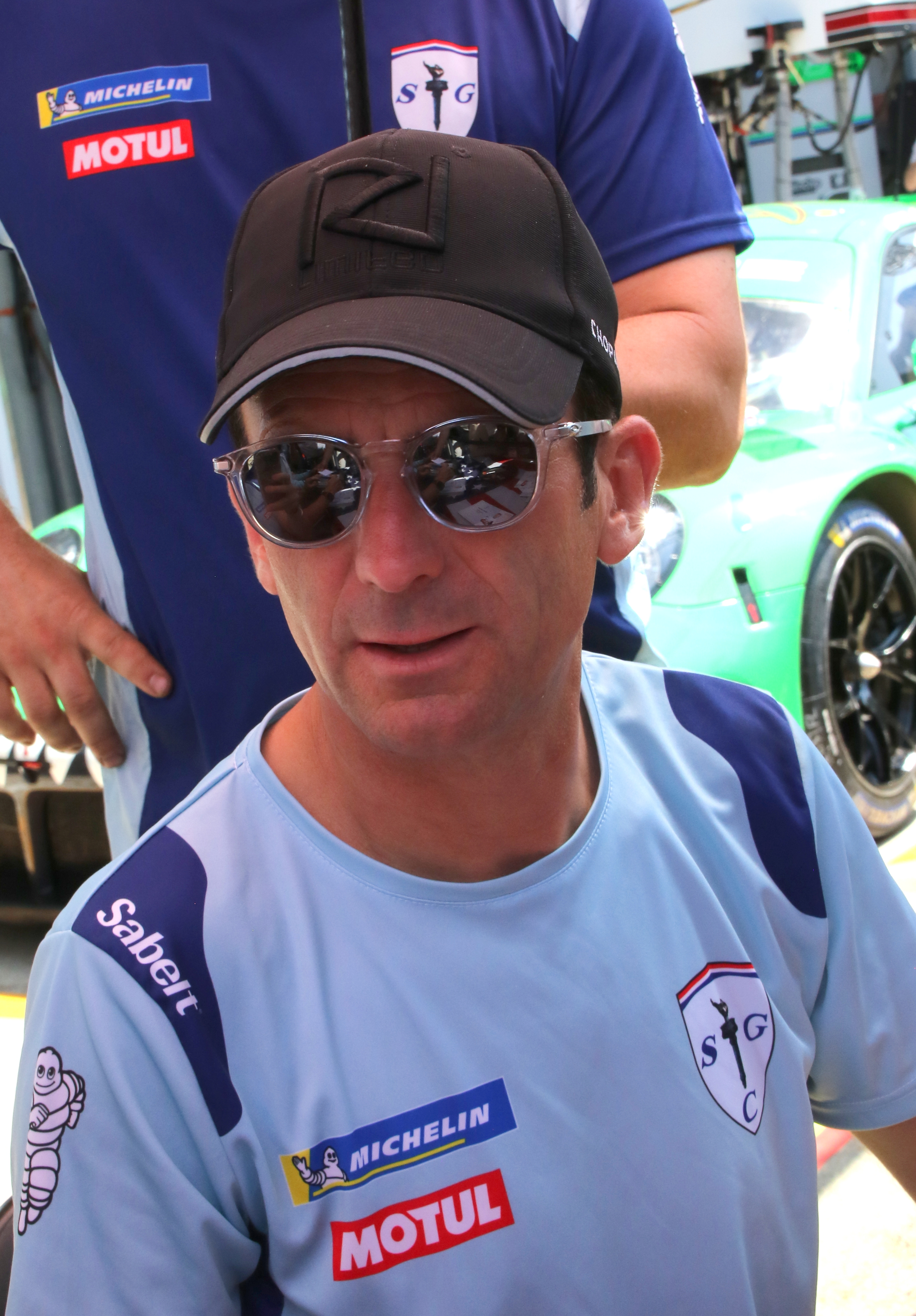
Dumas at the 2023 24 Hours of Le Mans

In December, 2023, Dumas set the world record for land vehicle altitude, driving a Porsche 911 to the peak of the west ridge of the Ojos del Salado volcano in Chile, 6,734 metres (22,093 ft) above sea level.

In 2024, Dumas earned his fifth overall Pikes Peak International Hill Climb victory, while driving a Ford F-150 Lightning SuperTruck in the Pikes Peak Open class. Dumas set a time of 8:53.563, just under seven seconds clear of second place.

Endurance remains his main program. He raced with Alpine at the 24 Hours of Le Mans in 2017, and then with Rebellion Racing and Scuderia Cameron Glickenhaus in the top class, with a podium-finish at the 2022 1000 Miles of Sebring and a pole position at the 2022 6 Hours of Monza in FIA World Endurance Championship.

== Career results ==
=== Complete Euro Formula 3000 results ===
(key) (Races in bold indicate pole position; races in italics indicate fastest lap)

Year	Entrant	1	2	3	4	5	6	7	8	9	DC	Points
2001	B & C Competition	VLL; 6	PER; Ret	MNZ; 3	DON; 5	ZOL; 14	IMO	NÜR	VAL; 2		7th	13
2002	John Village Automotive	VLL; 1	PER; Ret	MOZ; 1	SPA; 1	DON; 10	BRN; 2	DIJ; 6	JER; 4	CAG; 5	**2nd**	**42**

=== Complete JGTC results ===
(key) (Races in bold indicate pole position) (Races in italics indicate fastest lap)

Year	Team	Car	Class	1	2	3	4	5	6	7	DC	Pts
2001	Toyota Team SARD	Toyota Supra	GT500	TAI	FUJ	SUG; 9	FUJ; 13	MOT; Ret	SUZ; 9	MIN; 4	17th	14

=== Complete 24 Hours of Le Mans results ===
Year	Team	Co-Drivers	Car	Class	Laps	Pos.	Class Pos.
2001	(Germany) Freisinger Motorsport	(United States) Gunnar Jeannette (France) Philippe Haezebrouck	Porsche 911 GT3-RS	GT	282	7th	**2nd**
2002	(Germany) Freisinger Motorsport	(Germany) Sascha Maassen (Germany) Jörg Bergmeister	Porsche 911 GT3-RS	GT	321	17th	**2nd**
2003	(United Kingdom) Team Nasamax (United Kingdom) McNeil Engineering	(Canada) Robbie Stirling (South Africa) Werner Lupberger	Reynard 01Q-Cosworth	LMP900	138	DNF	DNF
2004	(Germany) Freisinger Motorsport	(France) Stéphane Ortelli (Germany) Ralf Kelleners	Porsche 911 GT3-RSR	GT	321	13th	**3rd**
2005	(France) IMSA Performance	(France) Raymond Narac (France) Sébastien Dumez	Porsche 911 GT3-RS	GT2	322	15th	4th
2006	(France) IMSA Performance Matmut	(France) Raymond Narac (Italy) Luca Riccitelli	Porsche 911 GT3-RSR	GT2	211	DNF	DNF
2007	(France) Pescarolo Sport	(France) Emmanuel Collard (France) Jean-Christophe Boullion	Pescarolo 01-Judd	LMP1	358	**3rd**	**3rd**
2008	(France) Pescarolo Sport	(France) Emmanuel Collard (France) Jean-Christophe Boullion	Pescarolo 01-Judd	LMP1	238	DNF	DNF
2009	(Germany) Audi Sport Team Joest	(Germany) Timo Bernhard (France) Alexandre Prémat	Audi R15 TDI	LMP1	333	17th	13th
2010	(Germany) Audi Sport North America	(Germany) Timo Bernhard (Germany) Mike Rockenfeller	Audi R15 TDI plus	LMP1	397	**1st**	**1st**
2011	(Germany) Audi Sport Team Joest	(Germany) Timo Bernhard (Germany) Mike Rockenfeller	Audi R18 TDI	LMP1	116	DNF	DNF
2012	(Germany) Audi Sport Team Joest	(Spain) Marc Gené (France) Loïc Duval	Audi R18 ultra	LMP1	366	5th	5th
2013	(Germany) Porsche AG Team Manthey	(Germany) Marc Lieb (Austria) Richard Lietz	Porsche 911 RSR	GTE; Pro	315	15th	**1st**
2014	(Germany) Porsche Team	(Germany) Marc Lieb (Switzerland) Neel Jani	Porsche 919 Hybrid	LMP1-H	348	11th	4th
2015	(Germany) Porsche Team	(Germany) Marc Lieb (Switzerland) Neel Jani	Porsche 919 Hybrid	LMP1	391	5th	5th
2016	(Germany) Porsche Team	(Germany) Marc Lieb (Switzerland) Neel Jani	Porsche 919 Hybrid	LMP1	384	**1st**	**1st**
2017	(France) Signatech Alpine Matmut	(United States) Gustavo Menezes (United Kingdom) Matt Rao	Alpine A470-Gibson	LMP2	351	10th	8th
2018	(United States) Porsche GT Team	(Germany) Timo Bernhard (Germany) Sven Müller	Porsche 911 RSR	GTE; Pro	92	DNF	DNF
2019	(France) Duqueine Engineering	(France) Nico Jamin (France) Pierre Ragues	Oreca 07-Gibson	LMP2	363	12th	7th
2020	(Switzerland) Rebellion Racing	(France) Nathanaël Berthon (Switzerland) Louis Delétraz	Rebellion R13-Gibson	LMP1	381	4th	4th
2021	(United States) Glickenhaus Racing	(Australia) Ryan Briscoe (United Kingdom) Richard Westbrook	Glickenhaus SCG 007 LMH	Hypercar	364	5th	5th
2022	(United States) Glickenhaus Racing	(Brazil) Pipo Derani (France) Olivier Pla	Glickenhaus SCG 007 LMH	Hypercar	370	4th	4th
2023	(United States) Glickenhaus Racing	(Australia) Ryan Briscoe (France) Olivier Pla	Glickenhaus SCG 007 LMH	Hypercar	335	6th	6th
2026	(France) RD Limited	(United States) Fred Poordad (France) Tristan Vautier	Oreca 07-Gibson	LMP2	353	30th	16th
2026	(France) RD Limited	(United States) Fred Poordad (France) Tristan Vautier	Oreca 07-Gibson	LMP2 Pro-Am	353	30th	8th

=== 24 Hours of Daytona results ===
Year	Team	Co-drivers	Car	Class	Laps	Pos.	Class Pos.
2002	(Germany) Freisinger Motorsport	(Portugal) Ni Amorim (Monaco) Stéphane Ortelli (Germany) Hans Fertl	Porsche 996 GT3-RS	GT	303	10th	**3rd**
2005	(United States) Brumos Racing	(United States) J.C. France (United States) Hurley Haywood (Germany) Timo Bernhard (Germany) Mike Rockenfeller	Fabcar FDSC/03-Porsche	DP	432	DNF	DNF
2007	(United States) Ruby Tuesday Championship Racing	(Germany) Jörg Bergmeister (United States) Patrick Long	Crawford DP03-Porsche	DP	615	18th	12th
2008	(United States) The Racer's Group	(United States) Tim George Jr. (United States) Spencer Pumpelly (United States) Bryan Sellers (France) Emmanuel Collard	Porsche 997 GT3 Cup	GT	657	11th	**3rd**
2009	(United States) Penske Racing	(Germany) Timo Bernhard (Australia) Ryan Briscoe	Riley MkXX-Porsche	DP	717	6th	6th
2010	(United States) The Racer's Group	(Germany) Timo Bernhard (United States) Tim George Jr. (United States) Bobby Labonte (United States) Spencer Pumpelly	Porsche 997 GT3 Cup	GT	668	16th	9th
2013	(United States) The Racer's Group	(France) Emmanuel Collard (Sweden) Niclas Jönsson (United States) Tracy Krohn	Porsche 911 GT3 Cup	GT	451	DNF	DNF
2018	(United States) CORE Autosport	(United States) Jon Bennett (United States) Colin Braun (France) Loïc Duval	Oreca 07-Gibson	P	808	**3rd**	**3rd**
2019	(United States) CORE Autosport	(United States) Jon Bennett (United States) Colin Braun (France) Loïc Duval	Nissan DPi	DPi	589	4th	4th

=== American Le Mans Series results ===
(key) (Races in bold indicate pole position; results in italics indicate fastest lap)

Year	Team	Class	Make	Engine	1	2	3	4	5	6	7	8	9	10	11	12	Pos.	Points	Ref
2002	Freisinger Motorsport	GT	Porsche 911 GT3-RS	Porsche M96/77 3.6 L Flat-6	SEB; DNF	SON	MID	AME	WAS	TRO	MOS	MON	MIA	PET					
2003	Team Nasamax	LMP900	Reynard 01Q	Cosworth XDE 2.7 L Turbo V8 (Bio-ethanol)	SEB; DNF	ATL	SON	TRO	MOS	AME	MON	MIA							
2003	Alex Job Racing	GT	Porsche 911 GT3-RS	Porsche M96/77 3.6 L Flat-6									PET; 1						
2004	Alex Job Racing	GT	Porsche 911 GT3-RSR	Porsche M96/79 3.6 L Flat-6	SEB; 2	MID; 7	LIM; 3	SON; 3	POR; 1	MOS; 11	AME; DNF	PET; 2	MON; 1						
2005	Alex Job Racing	GT2	Porsche 911 GT3-RSR	Porsche M96/79 3.6 L Flat-6	SEB; DNF	ATL; 2	MID; 1	LIM; 1	SON; 1	POR; 1	AME; 2	MOS; 6	PET; 4	MON; 5					
2006	Penske Racing	LMP2	Porsche RS Spyder	Porsche MR6 3.4 L V8	SEB; DNF	TEX; 5†	MID; 1	LIM; 1	UTA; 3	POR; 3	AME; 2	MOS; 1	PET; 2	MON; 1			6th	155	
2007	Penske Racing	LMP2	Porsche RS Spyder Evo	Porsche MR6 3.4 L V8	SEB; 3	STP; 2	LNB; 1	TEX; 1	UTA; 2	LIM; 2	MID; 1	AME; 1	MOS; 1	DET; 1	PET; 1	MON; 1	1st	239	
2008	Penske Racing	LMP2	Porsche RS Spyder Evo	Porsche MR6 3.4 L V8	SEB; 1	STP; 1	LBH; 2	UTA; 1	LRP; 2	MDO; 1	ELK; 2	MOS; 6†	DET; 4	PET; 2	LAG; 3		1st	203	
2009	Team Oreca Matmut AIM	LMP1	Oreca 01	AIM YS5.5 5.5 L V10	SEB	STP	LBH	UTA	LRP	MDO	ELK	MOS	PET; 5	LAG			26th	18	
2010	Muscle Milk Team Cytosport	LMP	Porsche RS Spyder Evo	Porsche MR6 3.4 L V8	SEB	LBH	LAG	UTA	LRP	MDO	ELK	**MOS**; **1**					20th	20	
2010	Porsche Motorsports North America	GTH	Porsche 911 GT3-R Hybrid	Porsche M97/79 4.0 L Flat-6 (Hybrid)									**PET**; **1**				NC	-	
2011	Audi Sport Team Joest	LMP1	Audi R15 TDI plus	Audi TDI 5.5 L Turbo V10 (Diesel)	SEB; 5	LNB	LIM	MOS	MID	AME	BAL						NC	-	
2011	Audi Sport Team Joest	LMP1	Audi R18 TDI	Audi TDI 3.7 L Turbo V6 (Diesel)									PET; Ret				NC	-	
2011	Porsche Motorsports North America	UNC	Porsche 911 GT3-R Hybrid	Porsche M97/79 4.0 L Flat-6 (Hybrid)								**MON**; **1**					NC	-	
2012	Audi Sport Team Joest	P1	Audi R18 TDI	Audi TDI 3.7 L Turbo V6 (Diesel)	SEB; 2												8th	20	
2012	Muscle Milk Pickett Racing	P1	HPD ARX-03a	Honda LM-V8 3.4 L V8		LBH	LAG	LRP	MOS	MDO	ELK	BAL	VIR	PET; 3			8th	20	
2013	Muscle Milk Pickett Racing	P1	HPD ARX-03a	Honda LM-V8 3.4 L V8	SEB; 4	LBH	LAG	LRP	MOS	ELK	BAL	COA	VIR				8th	20	
2013	Muscle Milk Pickett Racing	P1	HPD ARX-03c	Honda LM-V8 3.4 L V8										PET; DNF			8th	20	

^{†} Did not finish the race but was classified as his car completed more than 70% of the overall winner's race distance.

=== Complete FIA World Endurance Championship results ===
Year	Entrant	Class	Chassis	Engine	1	2	3	4	5	6	7	8	9	Rank	Points
2012	Audi Sport Team Joest	LMP1	Audi R18 TDI	Audi TDI 3.7 L Turbo V6 (Diesel)	SEB; 2									6th	67
2012	Audi Sport Team Joest	LMP1	Audi R18 ultra	Audi TDI 3.7 L Turbo V6 (Diesel)		SPA; 1	LMS; 4	SIL	SÃO	BHR	FUJ	SHA		6th	67
2013	Porsche AG Team Manthey	LMGTE Pro	Porsche 911 RSR	Porsche M97/82 4.0 L Flat-6	SIL; 4	SPA; 5	LMS; 1	SÃO	COA	FUJ	SHA	BHR		10th	72
2014	Porsche Team	LMP1	Porsche 919 Hybrid	Porsche 9R9 2.0 L Turbo V4 (Hybrid)	SIL; Ret	**SPA**; 4	LMS; 5	COA; 4	FUJ; 4	**SHA**; 3	**BHR**; 2	SÃO; 1		3rd	117
2015	Porsche Team	LMP1	Porsche 919 Hybrid	Porsche 9R9 2.0 L Turbo V4 (Hybrid)	SIL; 2	SPA; 2	**LMS**; 5	**NÜR**; 2	**COA**; 12	FUJ; 2	SHA; 2	BHR; 1		3rd	138.5
2016	Porsche Team	LMP1	Porsche 919 Hybrid	Porsche 9R9 2.0 L Turbo V4 (Hybrid)	SIL; 1	SPA; 2	**LMS**; 1	NÜR; 4	MEX; 4	COA; 4	FUJ; 5	SHA; 4	BHR; 6	1st	160
2017	Signatech Alpine Matmut	LMP2	Alpine A470	Gibson GK428 4.2 L V8	SIL	SPA; 5	LMS; 5	NÜR	MEX	COA	FUJ	SHA	BHR	21st	30
2021	Glickenhaus Racing	Hypercar	Glickenhaus SCG 007 LMH	Glickenhaus P21 3.5 L Turbo V8	SPA	ALG; 4	MNZ; 3	LMS; 5	BHR	BHR				4th	53
2022	Glickenhaus Racing	Hypercar	Glickenhaus SCG 007 LMH	Glickenhaus P21 3.5 L Turbo V8	SEB; 3	**SPA**; 3	LMS; 3	**MNZ**; Ret	FUJ	BHR				4th	70
2023	Glickenhaus Racing	Hypercar	Glickenhaus SCG 007 LMH	Glickenhaus P21 3.5 L Turbo V8	SEB; Ret	ALG; 8	SPA; 7	LMS; 5	MNZ; 8	FUJ	BHR			10th	34

=== Complete WRC results ===
Year	Entrant	Car	1	2	3	4	5	6	7	8	9	10	11	12	13	WDC	Points
2012	Romain Dumas	Mini John Cooper Works WRC	MON	SWE	MEX	POR	ARG	GRE	NZL	FIN	GER	GBR	FRA; 16	ITA	ESP	NC	0
2013	Romain Dumas	Ford Fiesta RS WRC	MON	SWE	MEX	POR	ARG	GRE	ITA	FIN	GER	AUS	FRA; 10	ESP	GBR	31st	1
2014	Romain Dumas	Porsche 997 GT3 RS 4.0	MON	SWE	MEX	POR	ARG	ITA	POL	FIN	GER	AUS	FRA; 19	ESP	GBR	NC	0
2015	Romain Dumas	Porsche 997 GT3 RS 4.0	MON; 26	SWE	MEX	ARG	POR	ITA	POL	FIN	GER; 26	AUS	FRA; Ret	ESP	GBR	NC	0
2017	Romain Dumas	Porsche 997 GT3 RS 4.0	MON; 26	SWE	MEX	FRA; 18	ARG	POR	ITA	POL	FIN	GER	ESP	GBR	AUS	NC	0

=== FIA R-GT Cup results ===
Year	Entrant	Car	1	2	3	4	5	Pos.	Points
2015	Romain Dumas	Porsche 997 GT3 RS 4.0	MON; 2	BEL; Ret	GER; 1	FRA; Ret	SUI	2nd	43
2017	Romain Dumas	Porsche 997 GT3 RS 4.0	MON; 1	FRA; 1	CZE; 1	ITA; 4	SUI; 1	1st	112

=== Dakar Rally results ===
Year	Class	Vehicle	Position	Stages won
2015	Cars	(France) Peugeot	DNF	0
2016	Cars	(France) Peugeot	20th	0
2017	Cars	(France) Peugeot	8th	0
2020	Cars	(France) Peugeot	DNF	0
2021	Cars	(Switzerland) Rebellion	DNF	0
2022	Cars	(Japan) Toyota	DNF	0
2023	Cars	(Japan) Toyota	22nd	0
2024	Cars	(Japan) Toyota	14th	0

=== Complete IMSA SportsCar Championship results ===
Year	Entrant	Class	Chassis	Engine	1	2	3	4	5	6	7	8	9	10	Rank	Points
2018	CORE Autosport	P	Oreca 07	Gibson GK428 4.2 L V8	DAY; 3	SEB; 4	LBH	MOH	BEL	WGL; 2	MOS	ELK	LGA	ATL; 7	20th	114
2019	CORE Autosport	DPi	Nissan Onroak DPi	Nissan VR38DETT 3.8 L Turbo V6	DAY; 4	SEB; 5	LBH	MOH	BEL	WGL; 11	MOS	ELK	LGA	ATL; 8	16th	97
2024	Proton Competition Mustang Sampling	GTP	Porsche 963	Porsche 9RD 4.6 L Turbo V8	DAY; 5	SEB	LBH	LGA	DET	WGL	ELK	IMS	PET		30th	281

== RD Limited ==
RD Limited was founded in 2008 as the RD Rally Team, initially serving as a rally motorsport team for Romain Dumas; in 2009, it was renamed RD Limited. Since 2008, the team has designed numerous Group R-GT cars (including the Cayman RGT), as well as the Norma M20 hill climb prototype and the RD Limited DXX Dakar buggy. Since 2024, the team has competed in endurance races in the Asian Le Mans Series and made its debut at the 24 Hours of Le Mans in 2026.

=== Complete Asian Le Mans Series results ===
(key) (Races in bold indicate pole position; races in italics indicate fastest lap)

Year	Entrant	Class	No	Chassis	Engine	Drivers	1	2	3	4	5	6	Pos.	Pts
2024–25	(France) RD Limited	LMP2	30	Oreca 07	Gibson GK428 4.2 L V8	(Australia) James Allen (United States) Fred Poordad (France) Tristan Vautier	SEP; 1	SEP; 2	DUB; 6	DUB; 2	ABU; 8	ABU; 3	2nd	88
2025–26	(France) RD Limited	LMP2	30	Oreca 07	Gibson GK428 4.2 L V8	(Australia) James Allen (United States) Fred Poordad (France) Tristan Vautier (United Kingdom) James Sweetnam	SEP; 6	SEP; 8	DUB; 3	DUB; 5	ABU; 3	ABU; 12	5th	52

=== Complete 24 Hours of Le Mans results ===
Year	Entrant	No	Car	Drivers	Class	Laps	Pos.	Class Pos.
2026	(France) RD Limited	48	Oreca 07-Gibson	(France) Romain Dumas (United States) Fred Poordad (France) Tristan Vautier	LMP2 (Pro-Am)	353	30th	8th

Sporting positions
Preceded by David Brabham; Marc Gené; Alexander Wurz	Winner of the 24 Hours of Le Mans; 2010; With: Timo Bernhard & Mike Rockenfeller	Succeeded by Marcel Fässler; André Lotterer; Benoît Tréluyer
Preceded by Earl Bamber; Nico Hülkenberg; Nick Tandy	Winner of the 24 Hours of Le Mans; 2016; With: Neel Jani & Marc Lieb	Succeeded by Earl Bamber; Timo Bernhard; Brendon Hartley
Preceded by Mark Webber; Timo Bernhard; Brendon Hartley	FIA World Endurance Champion; 2016; With: Neel Jani & Marc Lieb	Succeeded by Brendon Hartley; Earl Bamber; Timo Bernhard
Preceded by Marc Valliccioni	FIA R-GT Cup; Champion; 2017	Succeeded by Raphaël Astier
Records
Preceded by Sébastien Loeb; 8:13.878 (2013)	Pikes Peak Hillclimb; 7:57.148; 2018	Succeeded by Incumbent
