= 2015 24 Hours of Le Mans =

| Previous: 2014 | Next: 2016 |
Index: Races | Winners

The 83rd 24 Hours of Le Mans (French: 83^{e} 24 Heures du Mans) was a 24-hour automobile endurance event for teams of three drivers each entering Le Mans Prototype and Le Mans Grand Touring Endurance cars held from 10 to 14 June 2015 at the Circuit de la Sarthe, close to Le Mans, France. It was the 83rd running of the 24 Hour race organised by the Automobile Club de l'Ouest as well as the third round of the 2015 FIA World Endurance Championship. A test day was held two weeks prior to the race on 31 May. A record-breaking 263,500 people attended the event.

A Porsche 919 Hybrid driven by Neel Jani, Romain Dumas, and Marc Lieb started from pole position after Jani broke the circuit's lap record in qualifying. The race was won by the sister Porsche of Nick Tandy and Le Mans rookies Earl Bamber and Nico Hülkenberg, followed a lap behind by a third Porsche shared by Mark Webber, Brendon Hartley and Timo Bernhard. Audi's best car, driven by the title defenders Benoît Tréluyer, Marcel Fässler, and André Lotterer, finished third, a further lap behind the two Porsche vehicles. This was the seventeenth overall victory for Porsche, their first since 1998.

The LMP2 category was won by the KCMG Oreca-Nissan driven by Richard Bradley, Matthew Howson, and Nicolas Lapierre. The trio led all but nine laps of the race but only held a 48-second lead over the Jota Sport Gibson-Nissan at the race's end. Corvette Racing won their first class victory since 2011 despite one of their two cars being withdrawn after an accident in qualifying. Oliver Gavin, Tommy Milner, and Jordan Taylor held a five-lap margin in LMGTE Pro over the AF Corse Ferrari in second, after breaking away from the rest of the field in the second half of the race. The LMGTE Am class was led for most of the time by the No. 98 Aston Martin until driver Paul Dalla Lana crashed in the Ford Chicane in the final hour of the race, handing the victory to the SMP Racing Ferrari of Viktor Shaytar, Aleksey Basov, and Andrea Bertolini.

The result meant Lotterer, Tréluyer and Fässler remained the leaders of the Drivers' Championship on 80 points, 20 ahead of Tandy, and a further two in front of his co-drivers Bamber and Hülkenberg. Dumas, Jani and Lieb dropped from second to fourth and Bernhard, Hartley and Webber stood in fifth place. Porsche became the new leaders of the Manufacturers' Championship with 140 points; Audi were 16 points behind their nearest rivals with Toyota 69 points adrift in third with five races left in the season.

== Schedule and pre-championship standings ==
The 2015 Le Mans schedule was confirmed in an FIA World Motor Sport Council meeting in Munich on 26 June 2014. It was the 83rd running of the event, and the third of eight scheduled rounds of the 2015 FIA World Endurance Championship. Before the race Audi Sport Team Joest drivers André Lotterer, Benoît Tréluyer and Marcel Fässler led the Drivers' Championship with 50 points, 14 ahead of their nearest rivals Romain Dumas, Neel Jani and Marc Lieb and a further 14 in front of third-placed Mike Conway, Stéphane Sarrazin and Alexander Wurz. Anthony Davidson and Sébastien Buemi were fourth on 19 points, and Timo Bernhard, Brendon Hartley and Mark Webber stood in fifth place with 17 points. Audi were leading the Manufacturers' Championship with 70 points, 17 ahead of their rival Porsche in second; the third-place manufacturer Toyota had scored 47 points. Audi had so far dominated the season by winning the first two races of the campaign. Dumas, Jani and Lieb had twice finished in second while Davidson and Buemi along with Bernhard, Hartley and Webber had achieved third-place results.

== Circuit and regulation changes ==
Layout of the Circuit de la Sarthe

Following the introduction of slow zones during the 2014 24 Hours of Le Mans, the race's organiser, the Automobile Club de l'Ouest (ACO) revised the system for 2015. The limited speed in the zones was increased from 60 km/h (37 mph) to 80 km/h (50 mph). The number of zones around the circuit had also increased from 19 to 35, with a new lighting system to assist marshals added to each zone. Le Mans Prototype (LMP) teams were also required to carry additional flashing rain lights from Le Mans onward following a collision between two prototype cars in the rain at 6 Hours of Spa-Francorchamps caused by low visibility.

Modifications were made to the circuit from Mulsanne Corner to the Corvette Curves. The circuit was widened on the road connecting Mulsanne to Indianapolis, and again from Indianapolis to the Porsche Curves, although the kerbs remained in their previous locations. The first corner of the Porsche Curves had a larger run-off area on the outside while SAFER barriers had been installed on the inside wall. The Corvette corner also now featured a gravel run-off.

== Entries ==
=== Automatic invitations ===
Automatic entry invitations were earned by teams that won their class in the previous running of the 24 Hours of Le Mans, or won championships in other Le Mans-based series such as the IMSA SportsCar Championship (IMSA), the European Le Mans Series (ELMS), and the Asian Le Mans Series (ALMS). Some championship runners-up were also granted automatic invitations in certain series. All current FIA World Endurance Championship (FIA WEC) full-season entries also automatically earned invitations. As invitations were granted to teams, they were allowed to change their cars from the previous year to the next, but not allowed to change their category. In the ELMS, the "Le Mans" Grand Touring Endurance (LMGTE) class champion and runner-up were allowed to choose between the Pro and Am categories, while the GTC class champion was limited solely to an Am entry. The 2014 ALMS GTC competitors were also limited to the LMGTE Am class.

The ACO announced its initial list of automatic entries on 15 December 2014.

Automatic entries for the 2015 24 Hours of Le Mans
| Reason invited | LMP1 | LMP2 | LMGTE Pro | LMGTE Am |
|---|---|---|---|---|
| 1st in the 24 Hours of Le Mans | (Germany) Audi Sport Team Joest | (United Kingdom) Jota Sport | (Italy) AF Corse | (United Kingdom) Aston Martin Racing |
| 1st in the European Le Mans Series | | (France) Signatech Alpine | (Russia) SMP Racing | |
| 2nd in the European Le Mans Series | | | (Italy) AF Corse | |
| 1st in the European Le Mans Series GTC category | | | | (Russia) SMP Racing |
| IMSA SportsCar Championship at-large entries | | (United States) Wayne Taylor Racing | | (United States) Scuderia Corsa |
| 1st in the Asian Le Mans Series | | (France) OAK Racing Team Total | | (Taiwan) Team AAI |
| 2nd in the Asian Le Mans Series | | | | (Taiwan) Team AAI |

=== Entry list ===
In conjunction with the announcement of entries for the 2015 FIA WEC and the ELMS seasons, the ACO announced the full 56 car entry list for Le Mans, plus seven reserves. In addition to the 35 guaranteed entries from the FIA WEC, 13 entries came from the ELMS, three from IMSA, two from the ALMS, while the rest of the field was filled with one-off entries only competing at Le Mans.

=== Reserves ===
Seven reserves were initially nominated by the ACO, limited to the LMP2 and LMGTE Am categories. Algarve Pro Racing withdrew their reserve LMP2 entry, while Riley Motorsports was promoted from the reserve list when the second SARD-Morand entry withdrew from the FIA WEC. Five reserves remained on the list: A second KCMG LMP2, a second Ibañez LMP2, a third Proton Porsche, and the Formula Racing Ferrari and Gulf Racing Porsche.

== Testing and practice ==
A pre-Le Mans testing day was held at the circuit on 31 May, involving all 56 entries as well as the KCMG Oreca-Nissan, Ibañez Oreca-Nissan, Gulf Racing Porsche, and Formula Racing Ferrari reserve entries. Two LMP3 class Ginetta vehicles and two additional AF Corse Ferrari cars also participated. The two four-hour sessions were held under mixed weather conditions as rain swept through the area several times. Neel Jani set the fastest time in the early session with a 3:21.945 for the No. 18 Porsche, but Hartley improved to a 3:21.061 in the sister No. 17 Porsche. Audi's best time was a 3:22.307 lap for Marco Bonanomi in the No. 9 car, while Toyota could only muster a 3:25.321 lap. Laurens Vanthoor was the fastest LMP2 driver in the No. 34 OAK Ligier-Honda. Darren Turner's No. 97 Aston Martin was quickest in LMGTE Pro while Pedro Lamy helped Aston Martin also lead in LMGTE Am. The session served as the first appearance for the trio of Nissan GT-R LM Nismo amongst its World Endurance Championship competitors, although the cars were not on pace with the LMP1 field. After the test several prototype teams, including all Audi, Porsche, Toyota and Nissan cars participated in an unofficial test on the shorter Bugatti Circuit the following day to ensure car components were working efficiently before the race.

Four hours of practice were held for the field on Wednesday afternoon, but again suffered from variable wet-weather throughout. The No. 17 Porsche once again led the session although Webber was the fastest driver to set the 3:21.362 lap time. Audi closed to within half a second with Loïc Duval's 3:21.950 lap. The LMP2 category had only a single car manage a lap under three minutes and 40 seconds when Richard Bradley set a 3:39.897 lap, a full second ahead of the No. 34 OAK Ligier-Honda. The KCMG car had earlier caused the session to be red flagged when the car came to a stop at the first Mulsanne Straight chicane. The Murphy Prototypes Oreca-Nissan later caused a second stoppage when Mark Patterson spun in the Porsche Curves entry and heavily impacted the safety barrier. Patterson was unhurt. The LMGTE Pro category was again led by Aston Martin, Richie Stanaway's No. 99 car setting a 3:55.895 lap, followed by the No. 64 Corvette and the No. 97 Aston Martin. Mathias Lauda kept the No. 98 Aston Martin ahead in LMGTE Am, nearly two seconds ahead of the two Proton Porsche cars.

== Qualifying ==
The first dry session of the week occurred on Wednesday night in the first of three qualifying sessions to set the race's starting order with the fastest lap times set by each team's quickest driver. The first timed laps of the session immediately saw the qualifying record for the track, in its current configuration, broken. Bernhard's first timed lap of 3:17.767 in the No. 17 Porsche broke the 2008 record by nearly a second, only to be followed by Jani in the No. 18 Porsche with a 3:16.887 lap time. Neither driver improved their times over the rest of the session, giving the No. 18 Porsche provisional pole position, followed in third by the remaining Porsche 919. The Audi trio followed, with Duval leading the group but nearly three seconds off the pole pace. Toyota's best effort came from Sarrazin in the No. 2 car, nearly two seconds adrift of the Audi's lap times. Nissan's lap times improved to a 3:38.468, but were over twenty seconds off the pole position time.

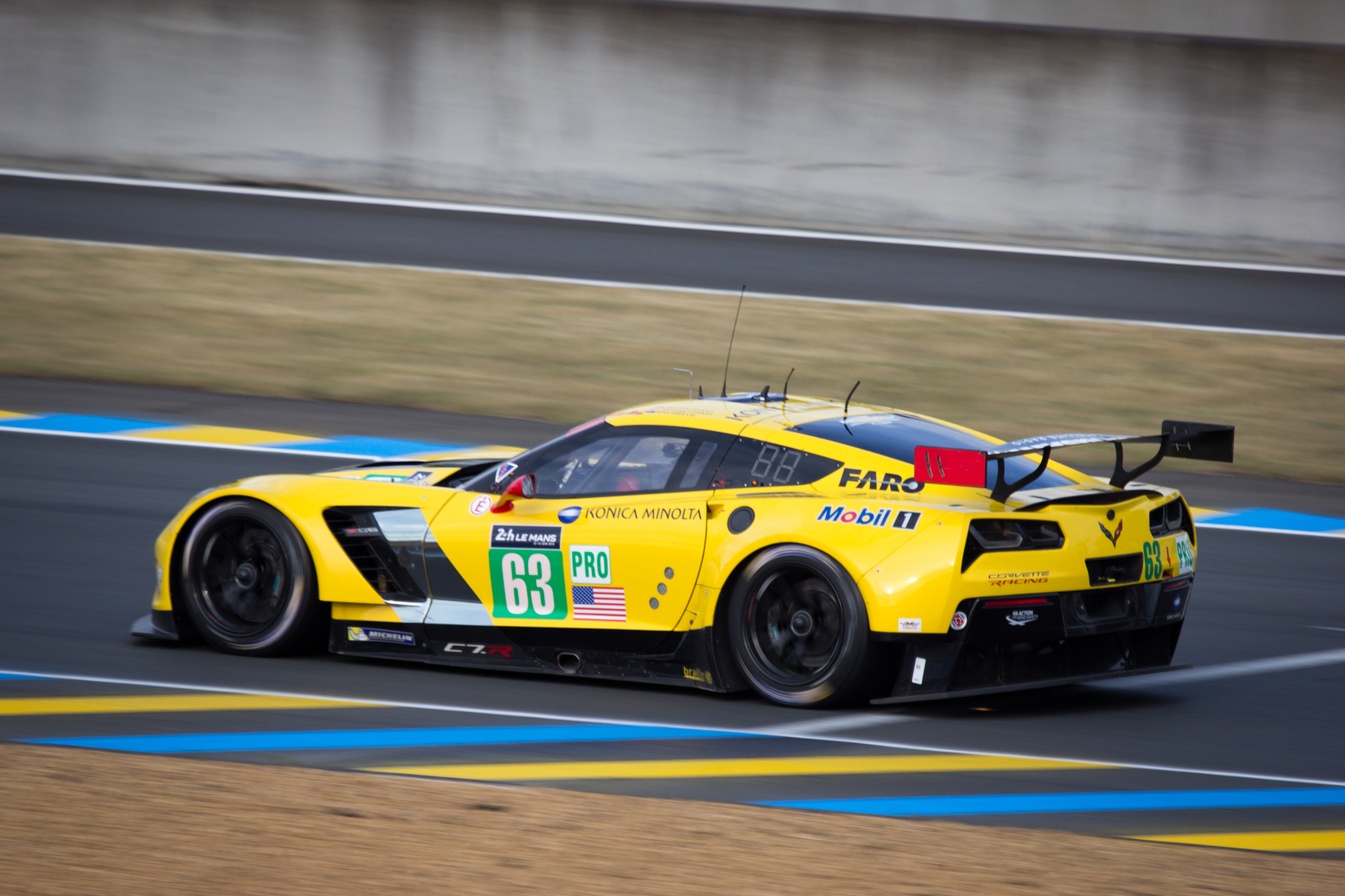
The No. 63 Chevrolet Corvette C7.R was withdrawn after it was heavily damaged in qualifying.

The fastest LMP2 lap time was also set early in the session, with Richard Bradley recording a 3:38.032 time in the KCMG Oreca-Nissan, nearly a full second ahead of the Greaves Motorsport Gibson-Nissan. The Greaves car, driven by rookie Gaëtan Paletou, later caused the session's only stoppage when it collided with the safety barriers at Mulsanne Corner and had to be towed back to the garage. Aston Martin dominated the LMGTE categories in the first qualifying session, with four of their five entries leading the overall positions in the category. Stanaway set the fastest time of 3:54.928 in the No. 99 car, while Pedro Lamy was the fastest Amateur category entry with a 3:55.102 lap to be second fastest among all LMGTE cars. Gianmaria Bruni's AF Corse Ferrari was third amongst LMGTEs before ACO officials disallowed their fastest lap times for going beyond the track limits, demoting the car down the grid. The two remaining LMGTE Pro Aston Martin drivers followed the dual class pole sitters, with Corvette the first car from another marque.

Initial weather forecasts predicted rain for the Thursday qualifying sessions, but it failed to materialise. The teams had two full sessions of clear but hot and humid weather. Porsche opted to use the day to prepare for the race. Nick Tandy's Porsche led the session with a 3:18.862 lap, but remained in third position on the provisional grid after Porsche allowed him another run. Audi No. 7 was the only other car to put in an improved lap time amongst the top ten cars. TDS Racing was the fastest LMP2 car in the session with a 3:40.441 yet still over two seconds behind the pole time of KCMG. The LMGTE categories also remained much the same, as Aston Martin still occupied the top four qualifying positions. Twice the session was stopped for heavy accidents, first for the No. 55 AF Corse Ferrari of Duncan Cameron who became stuck in a gravel trap for about 15 minutes. The second stoppage occurred when Jan Magnussen suffered a stuck throttle from debris lodged in the throttle-return linkage that closes the throttle when the driver lifts off the accelerator pedal in his No. 63 Chevrolet Corvette C7.R and hit the barriers twice in the Porsche Curves. Repairs to the barriers forced the cancellation of the remainder of the session, although half an hour was added to the final qualifying session. Magnussen was transported to the track's medical centre for a check-up and later released by the race organiser's medical staff. The Corvette was unable to be repaired and the team was forced to withdraw from the race because they did not bring a spare chassis to Le Mans.

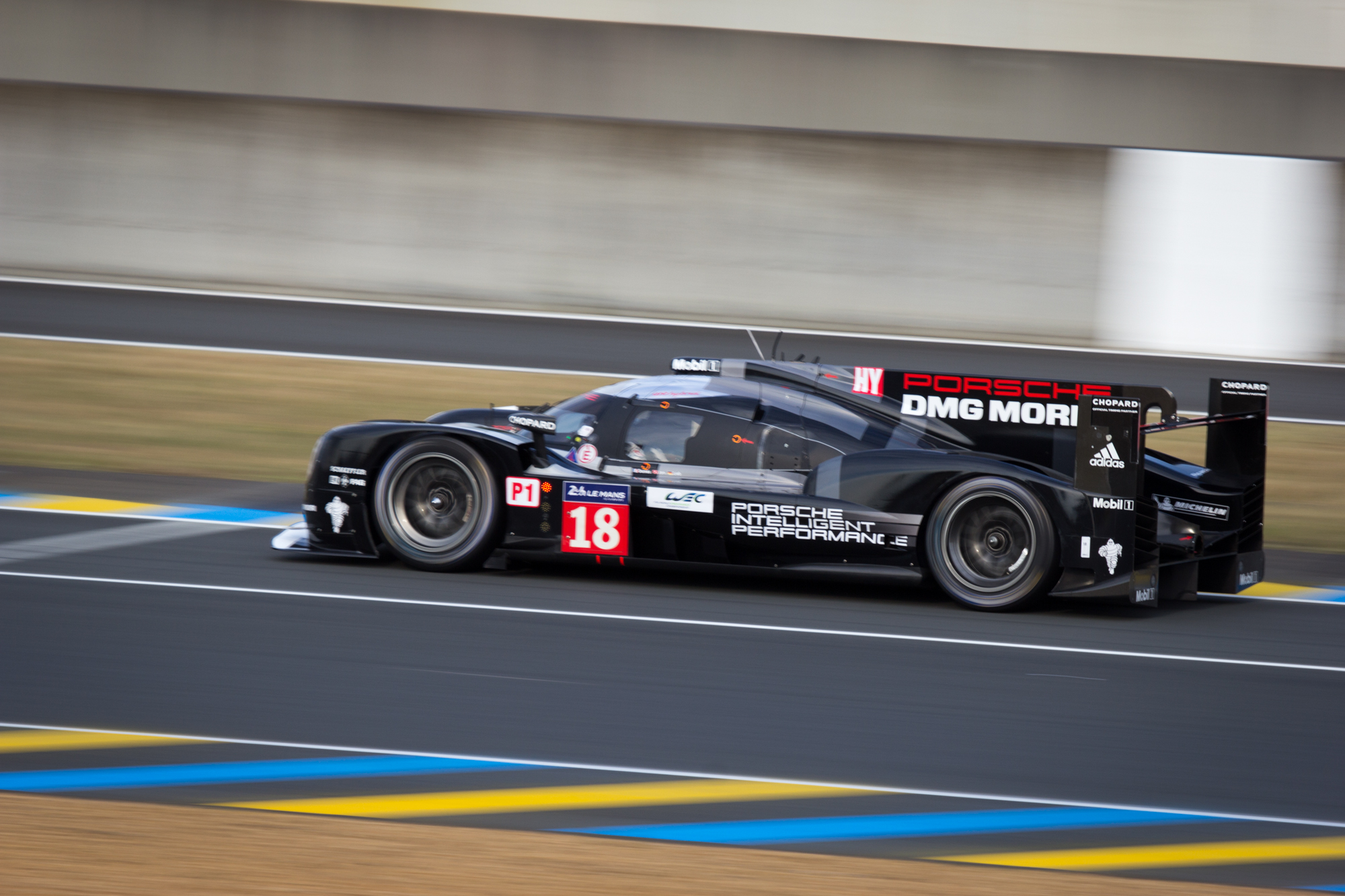
Neel Jani secured Porsche's first pole position at Le Mans since 1997.

As temperatures cooled in the final qualifying session, over a third of the field improved their fastest laps, but Jani's pole position time was unchallenged. Audi No. 7 led the session with a 3:20.967 lap time, still over four seconds shy of pole position. Nissan improved all three of their cars during the session, closing to within a second of the closest LMP1 competitor. The No. 26 G-Drive Ligier-Nissan closed to within a second of KCMG to take the second grid position in LMP2, while Greaves remained in third. In LMGTE Pro the No. 51 AF Corse Ferrari rebounded from the loss of their qualifying times in the first session to lead the final session and come within a tenth of a second of Aston Martin. The sister AF Corse Ferrari also improved to fourth in the category to split the top of the grid in the class amongst the two manufacturers. The lead in LMGTE Am remained with the No. 98 Aston Martin, a second and a half ahead of the No. 83 AF Corse Ferrari. SMP Racing improved their time by leading both of the day's qualifying sessions to take second place on the grid, splitting the Aston Martin cars. The No. 67 AAI Porsche suffered a fire during the session which halted qualifying for nearly half an hour.

Porsche's pole position was their sixth consecutive in the FIA World Endurance Championship, extending back to the 2014 6 Hours of Shanghai. It was also the company's first pole position at Le Mans since 1997.

=== Qualifying results ===
Provisional pole positions in each class are denoted in bold. The fastest time set by each entry is denoted with a grey background.

Final qualifying classification
| Pos. | Class | No. | Team | Qualifying 1 | Qualifying 2 | Qualifying 3 | Gap | Grid |
|---|---|---|---|---|---|---|---|---|
| 1 | **LMP1** | **18** | **Porsche Team** | **3:16.887** | 3:20.974 | 3.21.119 | | 1 |
| 2 | LMP1 | 17 | Porsche Team | 3:17.767 | 3:20.980 | 3:21.065 | +0.880 | 2 |
| 3 | LMP1 | 19 | Porsche Team | 3:19.297 | **3:18.862** | 3:22.097 | +1.975 | 3 |
| 4 | LMP1 | 8 | Audi Sport Team Joest | 3:19.866 | 3:21.681 | 3:22.678 | +2.979 | 4 |
| 5 | LMP1 | 7 | Audi Sport Team Joest | 3:21.839 | 3:20.561 | **3:20.967** | +3.674 | 5 |
| 6 | LMP1 | 9 | Audi Sport Team Joest | 3:21.081 | 3:22.494 | 3:20.997 | +4.110 | 6 |
| 7 | LMP1 | 2 | Toyota Racing | 3:23.543 | 3:26.380 | 3:23.738 | +6.656 | 7 |
| 8 | LMP1 | 1 | Toyota Racing | 3:23.767 | 3:25.233 | 3:24.562 | +6.880 | 8 |
| 9 | LMP1 | 12 | Rebellion Racing | 3:26.874 | 3:28.745 | 3:28.053 | +9.987 | 9 |
| 10 | LMP1 | 13 | Rebellion Racing | 3:31.933 | 3:38.044 | 3:28.930 | +12.043 | 10 |
| 11 | LMP1 | 4 | Team ByKolles | 3:40.368 | 3:36.825 | 3:37.167 | +19.938 | 29 (Note: The No. 4 ByKolles CLM-AER, the No. 21, No. 22, and No. 23 Nissans, and the No. 45 Ibañez Oreca-Nissan were all demoted to the back of the LMP grid for failing to set lap times within 110% of their respective class pole position times with all their respective drivers.) |
| 12 | LMP1 | 22 | Nissan Motorsports | 3:41.400 | 3:42.230 | 3:36.995 | +20.108 | 30 |
| 13 | LMP1 | 23 | Nissan Motorsports | 3:38.468 | 3:38.954 | 3:37.291 | +20.404 | 31 |
| 14 | **LMP2** | **47** | **KCMG** | **3:38.032** | 3:40.624 | 3:39.147 | **+21.145** | 11 |
| 15 | LMP1 | 21 | Nissan Motorsports | 3:51.289 | 3:39.992 | 3:38.691 | +21.804 | 32 |
| 16 | LMP2 | 26 | G-Drive Racing | 3:39.867 | 3:47.713 | **3:38.939** | +22.052 | 12 |
| 17 | LMP2 | 41 | Greaves Motorsport | 3:38.958 | 3:44.123 | 3:41.722 | +22.071 | 13 |
| 18 | LMP2 | 38 | Jota Sport | 3:39.004 | 3:45.770 | 3:40.920 | +22.117 | 14 |
| 19 | LMP2 | 36 | Signatech Alpine | 3:40.438 | 3:41.477 | 3:39.699 | +22.812 | 15 |
| 20 | LMP2 | 46 | Thiriet by TDS Racing | 3:39.923 | **3:40.441** | 3:39.805 | +23.036 | 16 |
| 21 | LMP2 | 34 | OAK Racing | 3:40.058 | 3:43.853 | 3:40.078 | +23.171 | 17 |
| 22 | LMP2 | 48 | Murphy Prototypes | 3:44.513 | 3:41.827 | 3:40.690 | +23.803 | 18 |
| 23 | LMP2 | 28 | G-Drive Racing | 3:40.967 | 3:46.504 | 3:42.053 | +24.080 | 19 |
| 24 | LMP2 | 43 | Team SARD Morand | 3:42.015 | No Time | 3:41.250 | +24.363 | 20 |
| 25 | LMP2 | 29 | Pegasus Racing | 3:42.023 | 3:43.824 | 3:43.850 | +25.136 | 21 |
| 26 | LMP2 | 27 | SMP Racing | 3:42.077 | 3:54.065 | 3:43.729 | +25.190 | 22 |
| 27 | LMP2 | 42 | Strakka Racing | 3:42.237 | 3:44.704 | 3:43.750 | +25.350 | 23 |
| 28 | LMP2 | 37 | SMP Racing | 3:42.417 | 3:52.383 | 3:43.549 | +25.530 | 24 |
| 29 | LMP2 | 30 | Extreme Speed Motorsports | 3:44.675 | 3:42.862 | 3:42.453 | +25.566 | 25 |
| 30 | LMP2 | 31 | Extreme Speed Motorsports | 3:46.165 | 3:44.631 | 3:46.585 | +27.744 | 26 |
| 31 | LMP2 | 40 | Krohn Racing | 3:44.899 | 3:44.854 | 3:45.491 | +27.967 | 27 |
| 32 | LMP2 | 45 | Ibañez Racing | 3:45.450 | No Time | 3:48.220 | +28.463 | 33 |
| 33 | LMP2 | 35 | OAK Racing | 3:52.843 | 3:59.244 | 3:53.995 | +35.956 | 28 |
| 34 | **LMGTE Pro** | **99** | **Aston Martin Racing V8** | **3:54.928** | 3:59.263 | 3:57.041 | **+38.041** | 34 |
| 35 | LMGTE Pro | 51 | AF Corse | 3:59.815 | 3:57.503 | **3:55.025** | +38.138 | 35 |
| 36 | **LMGTE Am** | **98** | **Aston Martin Racing** | **3:55.102** | 4:00.110 | 3:59.081 | **+38.215** | 36 |
| 37 | LMGTE Pro | 97 | Aston Martin Racing | 3:55.466 | **3:57.447** | 3:57.219 | +38.579 | 37 |
| 38 | LMGTE Pro | 71 | AF Corse | 3:57.216 | 3:58.398 | 3:55.582 | +38.695 | 54 (Note: The No. 71 AF Corse Ferrari was demoted to the back of the LMGTE grid for failing to set lap times within 120% of the overall pole position time with all three of its drivers.) |
| 39 | LMGTE Pro | 95 | Aston Martin Racing | 3:55.783 | 3:58.983 | 3:55.848 | +38.896 | 38 |
| 40 | LMGTE Pro | 63 | Corvette Racing – GM | 3:55.963 | 3:59.754 | No Time | +39.076 | WD |
| 41 | LMGTE Pro | 91 | Porsche Team Manthey | 3:57.192 | 3:57.843 | 3:56.618 | +39.731 | 39 |
| 42 | LMGTE Am | 83 | AF Corse | 3:56.723 | 4:03.641 | 3:57.844 | +39.836 | 40 |
| 43 | LMGTE Am | 72 | SMP Racing | 3:57.271 | **3:58.837** | **3:56.877** | +39.990 | 41 |
| 44 | LMGTE Pro | 92 | Porsche Team Manthey | 3:57.667 | 3:58.721 | 3:56.922 | +40.035 | 42 |
| 45 | LMGTE Pro | 64 | Corvette Racing – GM | 3:57.081 | 4:00.025 | 3:58.689 | +40.194 | 43 |
| 46 | LMGTE Am | 53 | Riley Motorsport-TI Auto | 3:59.054 | 4:01.501 | 3:57.836 | +40.949 | 44 |
| 47 | LMGTE Am | 77 | Dempsey-Proton Racing | 3:58.822 | 4:08.157 | 3:57.842 | +40.955 | 45 |
| 48 | LMGTE Am | 88 | Abu Dhabi-Proton Racing | 3:58.259 | 4:02.361 | 3:58.771 | +41.372 | 46 |
| 49 | LMGTE Am | 55 | AF Corse | 3:59.091 | 4:03.765 | 3:58.433 | +41.546 | 47 |
| 50 | LMGTE Am | 61 | AF Corse | 4:02.544 | 4:00.311 | 3:58.695 | +41.808 | 48 |
| 51 | LMGTE Am | 62 | Scuderia Corsa | 3:58.946 | 4:05.332 | 4:03.162 | +42.059 | 49 |
| 52 | LMGTE Am | 50 | Larbre Compétition | 3:59.522 | 4:02.871 | 3:59.566 | +42.635 | 50 |
| 53 | LMGTE Am | 66 | JMW Motorsport | 4:00.551 | 4:03.881 | 3:59.612 | +42.725 | 51 |
| 54 | LMGTE Am | 96 | Aston Martin Racing | 4:01.160 | 4:04.193 | 4:01.146 | +44.259 | 52 |
| 55 | LMGTE Am | 68 | Team AAI | 4:03.117 | 4:02.789 | 4:01.243 | +44.356 | 55 (Note: The No. 68 AAI Porsche was demoted to the back of the LMGTE grid for failing to set lap times within 110% of its class pole position time with all three of its drivers.) |
| 56 | LMGTE Am | 67 | Team AAI | 4:04.827 | 4:05.137 | 4:01.270 | +44.383 | 53 |

== Warm-up ==
The cars took to the circuit on Saturday morning for a 45-minute warm-up session in dry and clear weather. The No. 9 Audi driven by Filipe Albuquerque set the fastest time with a lap of 3:19.423. The sister Audi cars of Jarvis and Fässler were second and third overall. Dumas was fourth-fastest. His teammate Bernhard was fifth quickest and had the fastest lap before Albuquerque set his time. The fastest LMP2 lap was set by Mitch Evans with a time of 3:39.559. Stefan Mücke, driving the No. 97 Aston Martin, was the quickest driver in the LMGTE Pro category with the No. 88 Proton Porsche driven by Klaus Bachler the fastest of the LMGTE Am drivers. Gianluca Roda damaged the front-right corner of his No. 50 Larbre Compétition Corvette in a heavy crash at the Porsche Curves.

== Race ==
=== Start ===
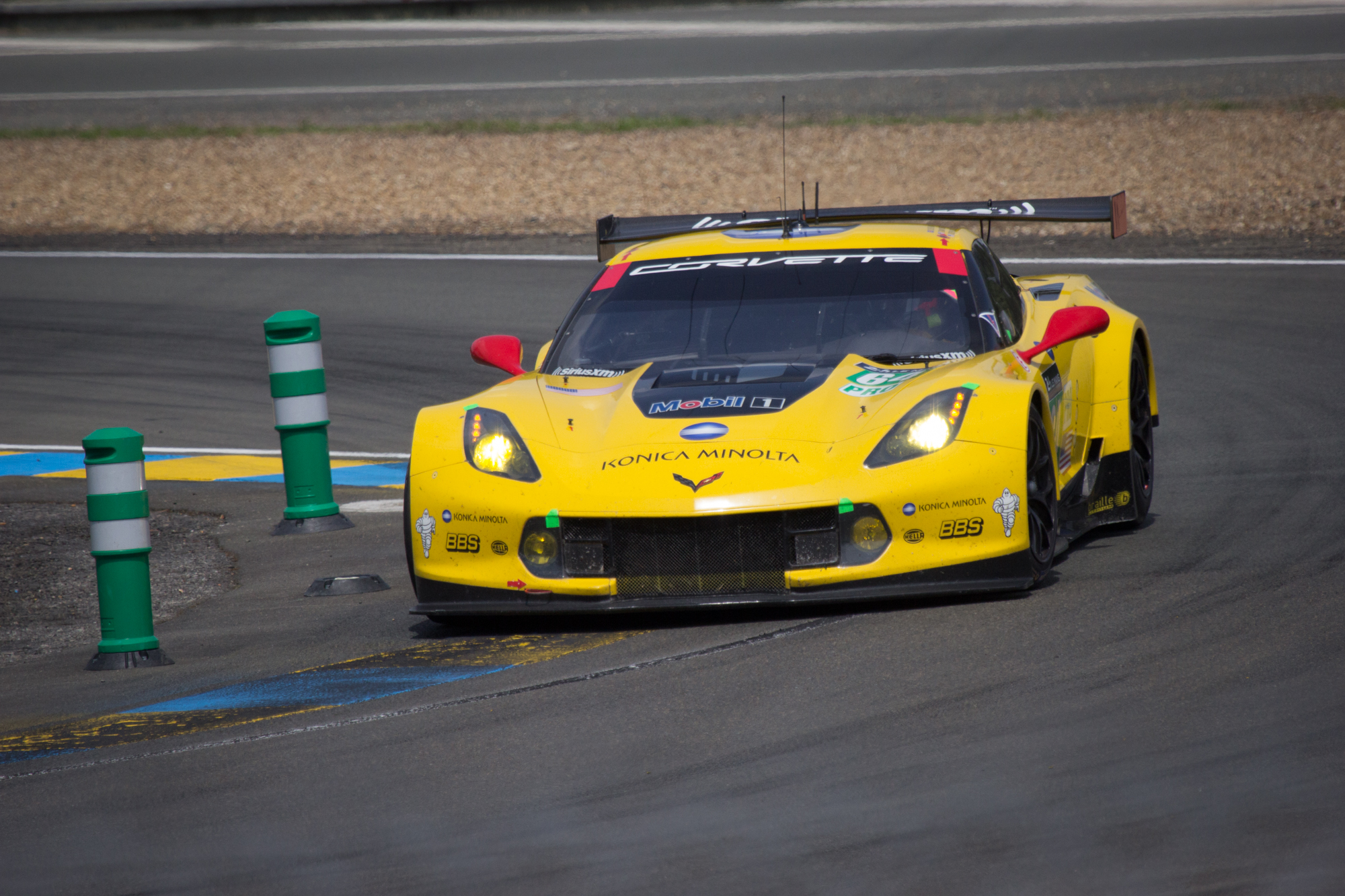
The GTE-Pro race-winning No. 64 Chevrolet Corvette C7.R

The conditions on the grid were dry and sunny before the race with an air temperature between 19 and 22 °C (66 and 72 °F) and a track temperature ranging from 23 to 25 °C (73 to 77 °F). A record-breaking 263,500 people attended the race. The French tricolour was waved at 15:00 Central European Summer Time (UTC+02:00), by the executive chairman of the Ford Motor Company Bill Ford to start the race, led by starting pole sitter Jani. Fifty five cars planned to take the start following the withdrawal of the No. 63 Chevrolet Corvette, but the No. 23 Nissan missed the opening laps while undergoing repairs to its clutch. Bernhard overtook Jani on the first lap while the trio of Audi cars were able to pass the No. 19 Porsche by the end of the second lap. The top six cars remained within a few seconds of each other as the group pulled away from the Toyota drivers. Duval lost third place to teammate Lotterer after battling with Jani through traffic for second position. The first hour of the race ended with the first retirement as the No. 92 Manthey Porsche began leaking oil and spun at the first chicane of the Mulsanne Straight. Despite resuming driver Patrick Pilet pulled to the side of the track further down the Mulsanne Straight as the engine compartment soon caught fire. The No. 42 Strakka Dome-Nissan of Jonny Kane and Alexandre Imperatori in the No. 13 Rebellion car were caught off guard by Pilet's oil and collided with one another in the chicane, stranding the Rebellion in the gravel trap while the Dome returned to the pit lane for repairs.

The safety cars were deployed to slow the race as marshals worked for 22 minutes to dry the spilled oil along the Mulsanne Straight. As the safety cars were recalled, Lotterer in the No. 7 Audi used slower traffic to pass both Porsche drivers in front of him and take over the race lead, just as Nico Hülkenberg moved to fourth place by passing the remaining Audi cars. In the LMP2 category the safety car had split the field up, leaving the TDS Racing and KCMG Oreca-Nissan cars forty seconds ahead of their class rivals. Richard Bradley for KCMG was able to fight with TDS Racing's Tristan Gommendy on the restart and eventually retake the class lead it had lost at the race start. Lotterer was later forced to give up the race lead as a puncture on one of the No. 7's tyres required an extra pit stop, allowing Hartley's No. 17 Porsche to the front of the race. Duval was caught on an approach to a phantom 60 km/h (37 mph) slow zone (which was enforced to allow a marshal to retrieve debris at Indianapolis but Duval had been told was cleared) by a group of slowed LMGTE cars and took avoiding action by steering right into the grass off track. The No. 8 Audi clipped the No. 51 AF Corse Ferrari's (Giancarlo Fisichella) right-hand section and was thrown back sideways across the track, impacting the outside barriers head on heavily driving into the right-hand turn before Indianapolis corner and ripping the car's front bodywork off. Safety cars were required once again as the barriers needed lengthy repairs, while Duval was able to drive the damaged Audi back to the garage. Repairs took less than five minutes and the car resumed in eighth place.

Several cars suffered issues during the second safety car period that went on for 45 minutes. Nicki Thiim brought the No. 95 Aston Martin from the LMGTE Pro lead straight to the team's garage with a leaking power steering system, handing the class lead to its sister No. 99 Aston Martin driven by Fernando Rees. Christian Ried in the No. 88 Proton Porsche suffered an engine fire in the second Mulsanne Straight chicane, extending the safety car period as it was tended to. KCMG retained their LMP2 class lead ahead of the TDS Racing car while behind the safety car, while the sole Corvette, No. 71 AF Corse Ferrari, and two circulating Aston Martin vehicles were nose to tail in LMGTE Pro, continuing their battle after the safety car period ended. Oliver Gavin's Corvette eventually pulled away from the rest of the LMGTE Pro field. The Riley Viper relinquished its lead in LMGTE Am to the No. 98 Aston Martin of Paul Dalla Lana and the SMP Ferrari driven by François Perrodo. As the safety car period ended the No. 17 Porsche of Hartley held the race lead, but Albuquerque was in pursuit in the No. 9 Audi, breaking the Le Mans lap record with a time of 3:17.647. The No. 9 Audi was able to mount a better challenge to the leading Porsche, and René Rast was able to take the race lead after pit stops.

=== Night and morning ===
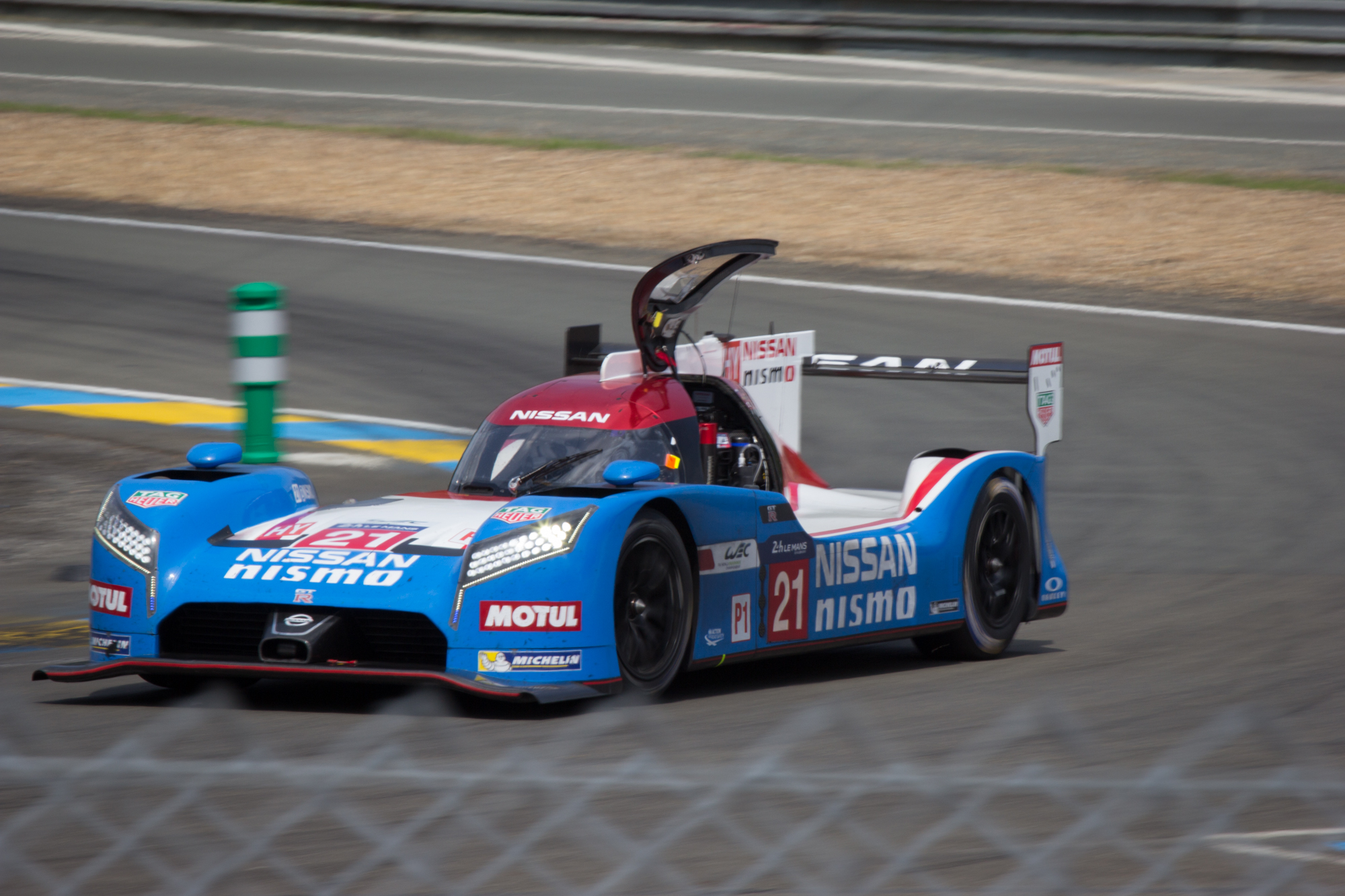
Nissan's No. 21 entry retired after its front suspension failed and lost the front-left tyre.

During the sixth hour of the race Gary Hirsch lost power in his Greaves Gibson-Nissan through the Esses and came to a halt; the car would later be abandoned after Hirsch was unable to repair a broken battery terminal. The No. 71 Ferrari was forced to the garage to fix starter motor problems, bowing out of its battle with Corvette and Aston Martin in LMGTE Pro. As dusk settled on the circuit, the No. 18 Porsche of Dumas braked too late for Mulsanne Corner and hit a tyre barrier early in the seventh hour. The car was able to return to the pit lane, only requiring new front bodywork, but the car fell to fifth position as the drivers had to move the brake bias to the rear that negatively affected the car's performance. Not long after Paul-Loup Chatin crashed his Signatech Alpine at Mulsanne Corner, bringing the safety cars out for the third time of the race. During this slow period Rob Bell pulled the No. 97 Aston Martin off course and onto the inside run-off area at the Mulsanne Straight and retired with a broken oil feed after striking the kerbing. When racing resumed, Hülkenberg was able to attack the leaders, first overtaking Webber's Porsche around the outside on the opening lap then passing Rast when he made a scheduled pit stop. Webber was later given a one-minute stop and go penalty for passing in a yellow flag zone, dropping him to fourth place. Nissan lost one of their three LMP1 entries when Tsugio Matsuda's No. 21 car stopped at Arnage with a suspension failure that caused its front-left wheel to detach from the vehicle and was unable to continue. The No. 22 Nissan also suffered a setback when it hit a loose wheel out on the Mulsanne Straight at 299 km/h (186 mph) and required a lengthy repair to its front-end.

As the race approached its halfway point, Lotterer gained on the No. 9 Audi and moved into second place, becoming Audi's lead challenger to Porsche. Several LMGTE cars took the opportunity to change brake discs at this point in the morning, including Rees in the No. 99 Aston Martin. Returning to the track Rees' car failed to stop in time for the first Mulsanne Straight chicane and hit the rear of the TDS Racing Oreca-Nissan of Gommendy. The Oreca, which had held second place in the LMP2 category, was abandoned in the gravel at the chicane while Rees limped the damaged Aston Martin back to the garage for repairs to its front-left corner. The No. 26 G-Drive Ligier took over second place in LMP2, although still a lap behind the leading KCMG Oreca while the lead in LMGTE Pro was now left to Jordan Taylor's No. 64 Corvette and the No. 51 AF Corse Ferrari of Bruni on the same lap. After leaving the pit lane, Pierre Ragues's No. 43 Morand car billowed smoke because of an oil pressure sensor failure and his vehicle caught fire, causing him to retire at Arnage corner. In the early morning the No. 7 Audi's hold on second place was relinquished when the right-rear bodywork of the car came apart on the circuit and littered debris at the Porsche Curves, requiring a seven-minute stop in the garage for repairs and dropping the car down the race order.

Roald Goethe was caught off guard as Hülkenberg lapped his No. 96 Aston Martin in Corvette Corner, causing Goethe to spin and heavily impact a concrete barrier leaving the turn. Goethe was conscious but needed aid in getting out of the Aston Martin requiring the intervention of a fourth safety car period. He was transported to a local hospital by ambulance where he remained for several days and underwent surgery to two vertebra which had been fractured. Oliver Turvey had been the fastest driver in LMP2 at the time, bringing the Jota Gibson-Nissan into third place. The No. 64 Corvette of Gavin came to the pit lane during the safety car period to change brakes, but was unable to get back out of pit lane in time before the exit was closed, forfeiting the class lead to Toni Vilander's No. 51 AF Corse Ferrari. When racing resumed Webber was able to attack the No. 9 Audi after driving through traffic and take second position. Nick Leventis' No. 42 Strakka Dome pulled off the track on the front stretch with gearbox issues and fluids leaked from his car, requiring a local slow zone. The No. 7 Audi of Lotterer made contact with Tandy's leading Porsche while both cars were in the slow zone, earning Lotterer a drive-through penalty. Viktor Shaytar overran the Indianapolis corner and became stuck in the gravel, losing two laps as it was extracted by recovery vehicles and went into the pit lane but remaining in second place in LMGTE Am.

The No. 9 Audi began to fall off the race pace after multiple visits to the garage for repairs to its hybrid system resulting in a new front-left drive shaft that took 17 minutes to install, but the No. 7 Audi kept fighting as Lotterer reset the fastest lap of the race with a 3:17.476 time. KCMG had an anxious moment in the 22nd hour when Lapierre missed the Indianapolis corner and ran into the gravel trap, but recovered with marshal assistance without losing the LMP2 class lead. The No. 51 AF Corse Ferrari of Bruni slowed on course and came to the garage with gearbox issues, handing the LMGTE Pro lead back to Corvette and allowing the No. 71 AF Corse Ferrari to climb to second place after recovering from its earlier issues. Vanthoor drove his car into his pitbox with gearbox problems but his team were unable to repair it before the race's conclusion and retired. Jann Mardenborough's Nissan came to a halt at the Porsche Curves after smoke bellowed out of the front of the car as the gearbox failed, leaving Nissan with a single car left circulating. Light rain began to fall on portions of the circuit in the final hour, but it was not heavy enough to affect the race. Dalla Lana, having led the previous 125 laps in LMGTE Am and within 45 minutes of the race finish, went straight on at the Ford Chicane and crashed heavily into an outside tyre barrier, ending the car's run and promoting the SMP Ferrari to the class lead which it held to the finish. Dalla Lana was unhurt.

=== Finish ===
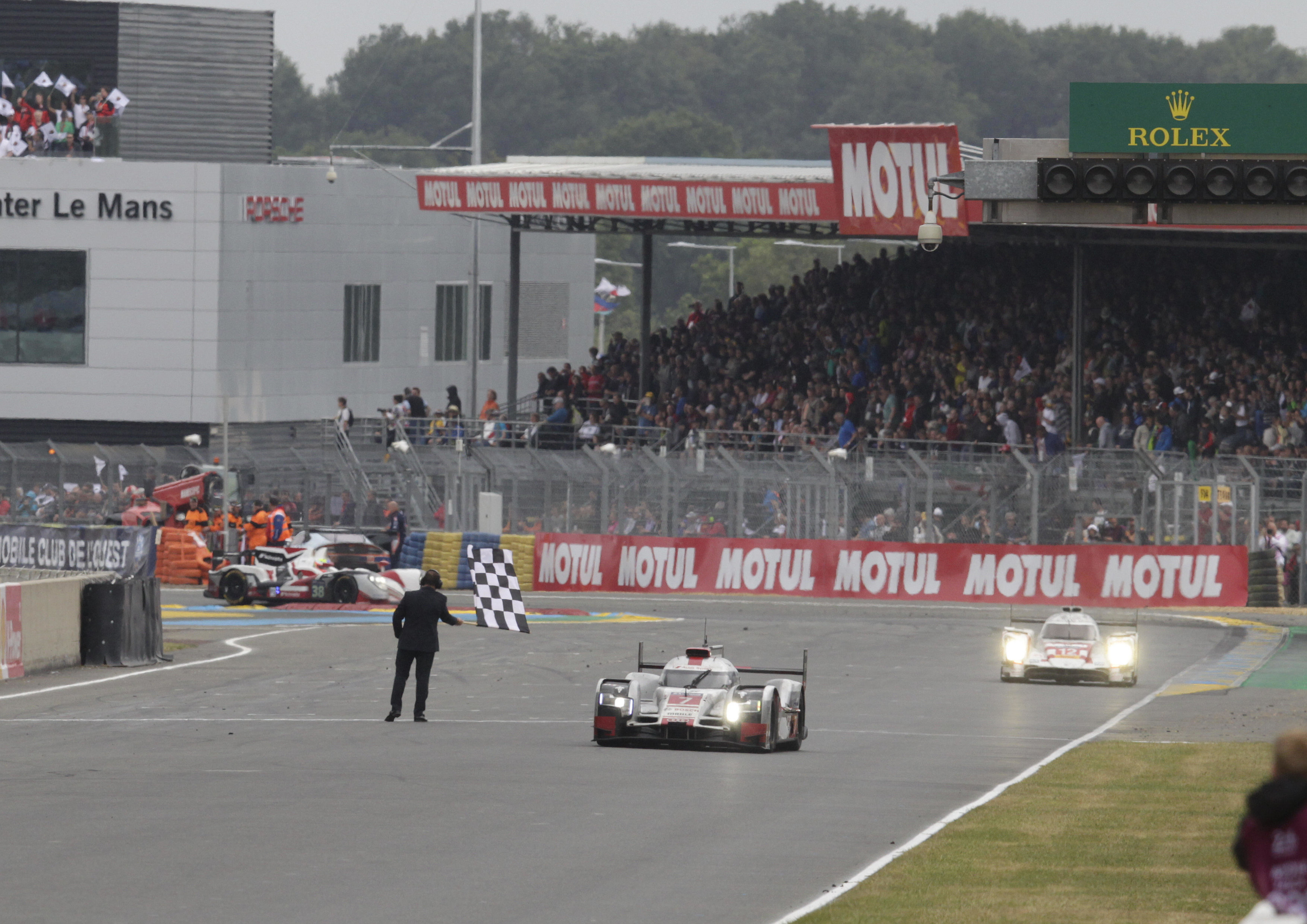
The No. 7 Audi finishing the race in third position.

Unhindered in the final hours of the race, Hülkenberg took the chequered flag for the No. 19 Porsche, a lap ahead of Hartley's No. 17 Porsche. Audi, in only their third defeat at Le Mans since 2000, were a further lap behind in third place with the No. 7 car. Toyota, unable to match the pace of Audi and Porsche, were twelve laps behind for a seventh-place finish, while debutants Nissan successfully finished the race with one of their cars, although it failed to complete enough laps for classification. Hülkenberg became the first active Formula One driver to win Le Mans since Johnny Herbert and Bertrand Gachot in 1991 and the first rookie to clinch overall victory since Laurent Aïello in 1998. Tandy became the 32nd British driver to win the event as well as the first Englishman since Guy Smith in 2003, and co-driver Earl Bamber was the third New Zealander after Bruce McLaren and Chris Amon to achieve the overall win. It was also Porsche's seventeenth overall victory in the 24-hour race. KCMG, unchallenged since the early hours of the race, were victorious in the LMP2 class after leading all but nine laps of the race, while Jota Sport was able to take second place from G-Drive Racing in the final hours. Corvette Racing held their five lap lead in LMGTE Pro, earning Gavin his fifth class victory, while AF Corse completed the class podium with the No. 71 ahead of No. 51. Following the loss of the No. 98 Aston Martin in the final hour, actor Patrick Dempsey's team moved into second place behind the winning SMP Ferrari, while Scuderia Corsa, in their first appearance at Le Mans, finished third. There were 28 outright lead changes during the race; four cars reached the front of the field. The No. 19 Porsche led seven times for a total of 243 laps, more than any other car.

== Post-race ==
The top three finishers in all four categories appeared on the podium to collect their trophies and in a later press conference. Hülkenberg revealed that Porsche's objective was to have one car featured on the podium and was astonished over the team's first and second-place results. He said that he was proud and delighted at his team's achievement: "We had a flawless race with a great pace and we didn't make any mistake. The last lap was a bit weird because it was drizzling and people got nervous in the garage. After the finish line, it is amazing to see thousands and thousands of people cheering up." Bamber stated that the win was "beyond my dreams" and hoped to return to the event in future years with Porsche. Tandy described his success as "surreal": "I can't think of two better people to share the car with. We haven't put a wheel wrong all race and we've just won the biggest race in the world."

Webber did not believe that his one-minute stop and go penalty prevented him from winning the event, saying he was not fast enough but praised the race victors on their success. Hartley stated it felt special to stand on the Le Mans podium and felt it would be a day that would be looked back in New Zealand motor racing history. Bernhard said that while the overall victory was his dream, he was proud of the Porsche team, and felt it was motor racing at the highest quality. Hülkenberg's success attracted praise from fellow Formula One drivers. During the Thursday pre-race press conference at the Austrian Grand Prix held one week later, Red Bull Racing driver Daniel Ricciardo thought Hülkenberg's victory made it more possible for Formula One participants to compete in other forms of motor racing and believed that they would receive praise for taking part in such events. Four-time World Champion Sebastian Vettel said that the driver made the victory "look easy" and it was a positive in improving the reputation of Formula One drivers.

The result meant Lotterer, Tréluyer and Fässler remained the leaders of the Drivers' Championship with 80 points, 20 ahead of second-placed Tandy, who in turn, was a further two in front of his co-drivers Bamber and Hülkenberg in third. Dumas, Jani and Lieb's performance saw them fall from second to fourth place and Bernhard, Hartley and Webber's second-place result allowed them to move into fifth on 53 points. Porsche were the new leaders in the Manufacturers' Championship with 140 points; Audi were 16 points behind their nearest rivals and Toyota maintained third place on 71 points with five races left in the season.

== Official results ==
The minimum number of laps for classification (70 per cent of the overall winning car's race distance) was 276 laps. Class winners are denoted in bold.

Final race classification
| Pos | Class | No. | Team | Drivers | Chassis | Tyre | Laps | Time/Retired |
| Pos | Class | No. | Team | Drivers | Engine | Tyre | Laps | Time/Retired |
|---|---|---|---|---|---|---|---|---|
| 1 | **LMP1** | **19** | **(Germany) Porsche Team** | **(New Zealand) Earl Bamber (United Kingdom) Nick Tandy (Germany) Nico Hülkenberg** | **Porsche 919 Hybrid** | M | **395** | **24:00:42.784** |
| 1 | **LMP1** | **19** | **(Germany) Porsche Team** | **(New Zealand) Earl Bamber (United Kingdom) Nick Tandy (Germany) Nico Hülkenberg** | **Porsche 9R9 2.0 L Turbo V4** | M | **395** | **24:00:42.784** |
| 2 | LMP1 | 17 | (Germany) Porsche Team | (Germany) Timo Bernhard (New Zealand) Brendon Hartley (Australia) Mark Webber | Porsche 919 Hybrid | M | 394 | +1 Lap |
| 2 | LMP1 | 17 | (Germany) Porsche Team | (Germany) Timo Bernhard (New Zealand) Brendon Hartley (Australia) Mark Webber | Porsche 9R9 2.0 L Turbo V4 | M | 394 | +1 Lap |
| 3 | LMP1 | 7 | (Germany) Audi Sport Team Joest | (Germany) André Lotterer (Switzerland) Marcel Fässler (France) Benoît Tréluyer | Audi R18 e-tron quattro | M | 393 | +2 Laps |
| 3 | LMP1 | 7 | (Germany) Audi Sport Team Joest | (Germany) André Lotterer (Switzerland) Marcel Fässler (France) Benoît Tréluyer | Audi 4.0 L Turbo Diesel V6 | M | 393 | +2 Laps |
| 4 | LMP1 | 8 | (Germany) Audi Sport Team Joest | (France) Loïc Duval (Brazil) Lucas di Grassi (United Kingdom) Oliver Jarvis | Audi R18 e-tron quattro | M | 392 | +3 Laps |
| 4 | LMP1 | 8 | (Germany) Audi Sport Team Joest | (France) Loïc Duval (Brazil) Lucas di Grassi (United Kingdom) Oliver Jarvis | Audi 4.0 L Turbo Diesel V6 | M | 392 | +3 Laps |
| 5 | LMP1 | 18 | (Germany) Porsche Team | (Germany) Marc Lieb (France) Romain Dumas (Switzerland) Neel Jani | Porsche 919 Hybrid | M | 391 | +4 Laps |
| 5 | LMP1 | 18 | (Germany) Porsche Team | (Germany) Marc Lieb (France) Romain Dumas (Switzerland) Neel Jani | Porsche 9R9 2.0 L Turbo V4 | M | 391 | +4 Laps |
| 6 | LMP1 | 2 | (Japan) Toyota Racing | (Austria) Alexander Wurz (France) Stéphane Sarrazin (United Kingdom) Mike Conway | Toyota TS040 Hybrid | M | 387 | +8 Laps |
| 6 | LMP1 | 2 | (Japan) Toyota Racing | (Austria) Alexander Wurz (France) Stéphane Sarrazin (United Kingdom) Mike Conway | Toyota 3.7 L V8 | M | 387 | +8 Laps |
| 7 | LMP1 | 9 | (Germany) Audi Sport Team Joest | (Italy) Marco Bonanomi (Portugal) Filipe Albuquerque (Germany) René Rast | Audi R18 e-tron quattro | M | 387 | +8 Laps |
| 7 | LMP1 | 9 | (Germany) Audi Sport Team Joest | (Italy) Marco Bonanomi (Portugal) Filipe Albuquerque (Germany) René Rast | Audi 4.0 L Turbo Diesel V6 | M | 387 | +8 Laps |
| 8 | LMP1 | 1 | (Japan) Toyota Racing | (United Kingdom) Anthony Davidson (Switzerland) Sébastien Buemi (Japan) Kazuki Nakajima | Toyota TS040 Hybrid | M | 386 | +9 Laps |
| 8 | LMP1 | 1 | (Japan) Toyota Racing | (United Kingdom) Anthony Davidson (Switzerland) Sébastien Buemi (Japan) Kazuki Nakajima | Toyota 3.7 L V8 | M | 386 | +9 Laps |
| 9 | **LMP2** | **47** | **(Hong Kong) KCMG** | **(United Kingdom) Matthew Howson (United Kingdom) Richard Bradley (France) Nicolas Lapierre** | **Oreca 05** | D | **358** | **+37 Laps** |
| 9 | **LMP2** | **47** | **(Hong Kong) KCMG** | **(United Kingdom) Matthew Howson (United Kingdom) Richard Bradley (France) Nicolas Lapierre** | **Nissan VK45DE 4.5 L V8** | D | **358** | **+37 Laps** |
| 10 | LMP2 | 38 | (United Kingdom) Jota Sport | (United Kingdom) Simon Dolan (United Kingdom) Oliver Turvey (New Zealand) Mitch Evans | Gibson 015S | D | 358 | +37 Laps |
| 10 | LMP2 | 38 | (United Kingdom) Jota Sport | (United Kingdom) Simon Dolan (United Kingdom) Oliver Turvey (New Zealand) Mitch Evans | Nissan VK45DE 4.5 L V8 | D | 358 | +37 Laps |
| 11 | LMP2 | 26 | (Russia) G-Drive Racing | (Russia) Roman Rusinov (France) Julien Canal (United Kingdom) Sam Bird | Ligier JS P2 | D | 358 | +37 Laps |
| 11 | LMP2 | 26 | (Russia) G-Drive Racing | (Russia) Roman Rusinov (France) Julien Canal (United Kingdom) Sam Bird | Nissan VK45DE 4.5 L V8 | D | 358 | +37 Laps |
| 12 | LMP2 | 28 | (Russia) G-Drive Racing | (Colombia) Gustavo Yacamán (Mexico) Ricardo González (Brazil) Pipo Derani | Ligier JS P2 | D | 354 | +41 Laps |
| 12 | LMP2 | 28 | (Russia) G-Drive Racing | (Colombia) Gustavo Yacamán (Mexico) Ricardo González (Brazil) Pipo Derani | Nissan VK45DE 4.5 L V8 | D | 354 | +41 Laps |
| 13 | LMP2 | 48 | (Republic of Ireland) Murphy Prototypes | (France) Nathanaël Berthon (India) Karun Chandhok (United States) Mark Patterson | Oreca 03R | D | 347 | +48 Laps |
| 13 | LMP2 | 48 | (Republic of Ireland) Murphy Prototypes | (France) Nathanaël Berthon (India) Karun Chandhok (United States) Mark Patterson | Nissan VK45DE 4.5 L V8 | D | 347 | +48 Laps |
| 14 | LMP2 | 27 | (Russia) SMP Racing | (Italy) Maurizio Mediani (Russia) David Markozov (France) Nicolas Minassian | BR Engineering BR01 | M | 340 | +55 Laps |
| 14 | LMP2 | 27 | (Russia) SMP Racing | (Italy) Maurizio Mediani (Russia) David Markozov (France) Nicolas Minassian | Nissan VK45DE 4.5 L V8 | M | 340 | +55 Laps |
| 15 | LMP2 | 31 | (United States) Extreme Speed Motorsports | (United States) Ed Brown (United States) Johannes van Overbeek (United States) Jon Fogarty | Ligier JS P2 | D | 339 | +56 Laps |
| 15 | LMP2 | 31 | (United States) Extreme Speed Motorsports | (United States) Ed Brown (United States) Johannes van Overbeek (United States) Jon Fogarty | Honda HR28TT 2.8 L Turbo V6 | D | 339 | +56 Laps |
| 16 | LMP2 | 45 | (San Marino) Ibañez Racing | (France) José Ibañez (France) Pierre Perret (Italy) Ivan Bellarosa | Oreca 03R | D | 337 | +58 Laps |
| 16 | LMP2 | 45 | (San Marino) Ibañez Racing | (France) José Ibañez (France) Pierre Perret (Italy) Ivan Bellarosa | Nissan VK45DE 4.5 L V8 | D | 337 | +58 Laps |
| 17 | **LMGTE; Pro** | **64** | **(United States) Corvette Racing – GM** | **(United Kingdom) Oliver Gavin (United States) Tommy Milner (United States) Jordan Taylor** | **Chevrolet Corvette C7.R** | M | **337** | **+58 Laps** |
| 17 | **LMGTE; Pro** | **64** | **(United States) Corvette Racing – GM** | **(United Kingdom) Oliver Gavin (United States) Tommy Milner (United States) Jordan Taylor** | **Chevrolet 5.5 L V8** | M | **337** | **+58 Laps** |
| 18 | LMP1 | 13 | (Switzerland) Rebellion Racing | (Switzerland) Alexandre Imperatori (Austria) Dominik Kraihamer (Germany) Daniel Abt | Rebellion R-One | M | 336 | +59 Laps |
| 18 | LMP1 | 13 | (Switzerland) Rebellion Racing | (Switzerland) Alexandre Imperatori (Austria) Dominik Kraihamer (Germany) Daniel Abt | AER P60 2.4 L Turbo V6 | M | 336 | +59 Laps |
| 19 | LMP2 | 29 | (Germany) Pegasus Racing | (France) Léo Roussel (Netherlands) Ho-Pin Tung (China) David Cheng | Morgan LMP2 | M | 334 | +61 Laps |
| 19 | LMP2 | 29 | (Germany) Pegasus Racing | (France) Léo Roussel (Netherlands) Ho-Pin Tung (China) David Cheng | Nissan VK45DE 4.5 L V8 | M | 334 | +61 Laps |
| 20 | **LMGTE; Am** | **72** | **(Russia) SMP Racing** | **(Russia) Viktor Shaytar (Russia) Aleksey Basov (Italy) Andrea Bertolini** | **Ferrari 458 Italia GT2** | M | **332** | **+63 Laps** |
| 20 | **LMGTE; Am** | **72** | **(Russia) SMP Racing** | **(Russia) Viktor Shaytar (Russia) Aleksey Basov (Italy) Andrea Bertolini** | **Ferrari 4.5 L V8** | M | **332** | **+63 Laps** |
| 21 | LMGTE; Pro | 71 | (Italy) AF Corse | (Italy) Davide Rigon (United Kingdom) James Calado (Monaco) Olivier Beretta | Ferrari 458 Italia GT2 | M | 332 | +63 Laps |
| 21 | LMGTE; Pro | 71 | (Italy) AF Corse | (Italy) Davide Rigon (United Kingdom) James Calado (Monaco) Olivier Beretta | Ferrari 4.5 L V8 | M | 332 | +63 Laps |
| 22 | LMGTE; Am | 77 | (Germany) Dempsey-Proton Racing | (United States) Patrick Dempsey (United States) Patrick Long (Germany) Marco Seefried | Porsche 911 RSR | M | 331 | +64 Laps |
| 22 | LMGTE; Am | 77 | (Germany) Dempsey-Proton Racing | (United States) Patrick Dempsey (United States) Patrick Long (Germany) Marco Seefried | Porsche 4.0 L Flat-6 | M | 331 | +64 Laps |
| 23 | LMP1 | 12 | (Switzerland) Rebellion Racing | (France) Nicolas Prost (Germany) Nick Heidfeld (Switzerland) Mathias Beche | Rebellion R-One | M | 330 | +65 Laps |
| 23 | LMP1 | 12 | (Switzerland) Rebellion Racing | (France) Nicolas Prost (Germany) Nick Heidfeld (Switzerland) Mathias Beche | AER P60 2.4 L Turbo V6 | M | 330 | +65 Laps |
| 24 | LMGTE; Am | 62 | (United States) Scuderia Corsa | (United States) Bill Sweedler (United States) Townsend Bell (United States) Jeff Segal | Ferrari 458 Italia GT2 | M | 330 | +65 Laps |
| 24 | LMGTE; Am | 62 | (United States) Scuderia Corsa | (United States) Bill Sweedler (United States) Townsend Bell (United States) Jeff Segal | Ferrari 4.5 L V8 | M | 330 | +65 Laps |
| 25 | LMGTE; Pro | 51 | (Italy) AF Corse | (Italy) Gianmaria Bruni (Italy) Giancarlo Fisichella (Finland) Toni Vilander | Ferrari 458 Italia GT2 | M | 330 | +65 Laps |
| 25 | LMGTE; Pro | 51 | (Italy) AF Corse | (Italy) Gianmaria Bruni (Italy) Giancarlo Fisichella (Finland) Toni Vilander | Ferrari 4.5 L V8 | M | 330 | +65 Laps |
| 26 | LMGTE; Am | 83 | (Italy) AF Corse | (France) François Perrodo (France) Emmanuel Collard (Portugal) Rui Águas | Ferrari 458 Italia GT2 | M | 330 | +65 Laps |
| 26 | LMGTE; Am | 83 | (Italy) AF Corse | (France) François Perrodo (France) Emmanuel Collard (Portugal) Rui Águas | Ferrari 4.5 L V8 | M | 330 | +65 Laps |
| 27 | LMGTE; Pro | 95 | (United Kingdom) Aston Martin Racing | (Denmark) Christoffer Nygaard (Denmark) Nicki Thiim (Denmark) Marco Sørensen | Aston Martin V8 Vantage GTE | M | 330 | +65 Laps |
| 27 | LMGTE; Pro | 95 | (United Kingdom) Aston Martin Racing | (Denmark) Christoffer Nygaard (Denmark) Nicki Thiim (Denmark) Marco Sørensen | Aston Martin 4.5 L V8 | M | 330 | +65 Laps |
| 28 | LMP2 | 30 | (United States) Extreme Speed Motorsports | (United States) Scott Sharp (United Kingdom) Ryan Dalziel (Denmark) David Heinemeier Hansson | Ligier JS P2 | D | 329 | +66 Laps |
| 28 | LMP2 | 30 | (United States) Extreme Speed Motorsports | (United States) Scott Sharp (United Kingdom) Ryan Dalziel (Denmark) David Heinemeier Hansson | Honda HR28TT 2.8 L Turbo V6 | D | 329 | +66 Laps |
| 29 | LMP2 | 35 | (France) OAK Racing | (France) Jacques Nicolet (France) Jean-Marc Merlin (France) Erik Maris | Ligier JS P2 | D | 328 | +67 Laps |
| 29 | LMP2 | 35 | (France) OAK Racing | (France) Jacques Nicolet (France) Jean-Marc Merlin (France) Erik Maris | Nissan VK45DE 4.5 L V8 | D | 328 | +67 Laps |
| 30 | LMGTE; Pro | 91 | (Germany) Porsche Team Manthey | (Austria) Richard Lietz (Denmark) Michael Christensen (Germany) Jörg Bergmeister | Porsche 911 RSR | M | 327 | +68 Laps |
| 30 | LMGTE; Pro | 91 | (Germany) Porsche Team Manthey | (Austria) Richard Lietz (Denmark) Michael Christensen (Germany) Jörg Bergmeister | Porsche 4.0 L Flat-6 | M | 327 | +68 Laps |
| 31 | LMGTE; Am | 61 | (Italy) AF Corse | (United States) Peter Ashley Mann (Italy) Raffaele Giammaria (Italy) Matteo Cressoni | Ferrari 458 Italia GT2 | M | 326 | +69 Laps |
| 31 | LMGTE; Am | 61 | (Italy) AF Corse | (United States) Peter Ashley Mann (Italy) Raffaele Giammaria (Italy) Matteo Cressoni | Ferrari 4.5 L V8 | M | 326 | +69 Laps |
| 32 | LMP2 | 40 | (United States) Krohn Racing | (United States) Tracy Krohn (Sweden) Niclas Jönsson (Portugal) João Barbosa | Ligier JS P2 | M | 323 | +72 Laps |
| 32 | LMP2 | 40 | (United States) Krohn Racing | (United States) Tracy Krohn (Sweden) Niclas Jönsson (Portugal) João Barbosa | Judd HK 3.6 L V8 | M | 323 | +72 Laps |
| 33 | LMP2 | 37 | (Russia) SMP Racing | (Russia) Mikhail Aleshin (Russia) Kirill Ladygin (Russia) Anton Ladygin | BR Engineering BR01 | M | 322 | +73 Laps |
| 33 | LMP2 | 37 | (Russia) SMP Racing | (Russia) Mikhail Aleshin (Russia) Kirill Ladygin (Russia) Anton Ladygin | Nissan VK45DE 4.5 L V8 | M | 322 | +73 Laps |
| 34 | LMGTE; Pro | 99 | (United Kingdom) Aston Martin Racing V8 | (Brazil) Fernando Rees (United Kingdom) Alex MacDowall (New Zealand) Richie Stanaway | Aston Martin V8 Vantage GTE | M | 320 | +75 Laps |
| 34 | LMGTE; Pro | 99 | (United Kingdom) Aston Martin Racing V8 | (Brazil) Fernando Rees (United Kingdom) Alex MacDowall (New Zealand) Richie Stanaway | Aston Martin 4.5 L V8 | M | 320 | +75 Laps |
| 35 | LMGTE; Am | 68 | (Taiwan) Team AAI | (Taiwan) Han-Chen Chen (France) Gilles Vannelet (France) Mike Parisy | Porsche 911 RSR | M | 320 | +75 Laps |
| 35 | LMGTE; Am | 68 | (Taiwan) Team AAI | (Taiwan) Han-Chen Chen (France) Gilles Vannelet (France) Mike Parisy | Porsche 4.0 L Flat-6 | M | 320 | +75 Laps |
| 36 | LMGTE; Am | 66 | (United Kingdom) JMW Motorsport | (Poland) Kuba Giermaziak (United States) Michael Avenatti (Saudi Arabia) Abdulaziz al Faisal | Ferrari 458 Italia GT2 | D | 320 | +75 Laps |
| 36 | LMGTE; Am | 66 | (United Kingdom) JMW Motorsport | (Poland) Kuba Giermaziak (United States) Michael Avenatti (Saudi Arabia) Abdulaziz al Faisal | Ferrari 4.5 L V8 | D | 320 | +75 Laps |
| 37 | LMGTE; Am | 67 | (Taiwan) Team AAI | (Taiwan) Jun-San Chen (Netherlands) Xavier Maassen (United Kingdom) Alex Kapadia | Porsche 997 GT3 RSR | M | 316 | +79 Laps |
| 37 | LMGTE; Am | 67 | (Taiwan) Team AAI | (Taiwan) Jun-San Chen (Netherlands) Xavier Maassen (United Kingdom) Alex Kapadia | Porsche 4.0 L Flat-6 | M | 316 | +79 Laps |
| NC | LMGTE; Am | 98 | (United Kingdom) Aston Martin Racing | (Canada) Paul Dalla Lana (Portugal) Pedro Lamy (Austria) Mathias Lauda | Aston Martin V8 Vantage GTE | M | 321 | Incomplete final lap |
| NC | LMGTE; Am | 98 | (United Kingdom) Aston Martin Racing | (Canada) Paul Dalla Lana (Portugal) Pedro Lamy (Austria) Mathias Lauda | Aston Martin 4.5 L V8 | M | 321 | Incomplete final lap |
| NC | LMP1 | 22 | (Japan) Nissan Motorsports | (United Kingdom) Harry Tincknell (United Kingdom) Alex Buncombe (Germany) Michael Krumm | Nissan GT-R LM Nismo | M | 242 | Insufficient distance |
| NC | LMP1 | 22 | (Japan) Nissan Motorsports | (United Kingdom) Harry Tincknell (United Kingdom) Alex Buncombe (Germany) Michael Krumm | Nissan VRX30A 3.0 L Turbo V6 | M | 242 | Insufficient distance |
| DNF | LMP2 | 34 | (France) OAK Racing | (Canada) Chris Cumming (France) Kévin Estre (Belgium) Laurens Vanthoor | Ligier JS P2 | D | 329 | Gearbox |
| DNF | LMP2 | 34 | (France) OAK Racing | (Canada) Chris Cumming (France) Kévin Estre (Belgium) Laurens Vanthoor | Honda HR28TT 2.8 L Turbo V6 | D | 329 | Gearbox |
| DNF | LMGTE; Am | 53 | (United States) Riley Motorsports-TI Auto | (Netherlands) Jeroen Bleekemolen (United States) Ben Keating (United States) Marc Miller | Dodge Viper SRT GTS-R | M | 304 | Gearbox |
| DNF | LMGTE; Am | 53 | (United States) Riley Motorsports-TI Auto | (Netherlands) Jeroen Bleekemolen (United States) Ben Keating (United States) Marc Miller | Dodge 8.0 L V10 | M | 304 | Gearbox |
| DNF | LMP2 | 42 | (United Kingdom) Strakka Racing | (United Kingdom) Nick Leventis (United Kingdom) Jonny Kane (United Kingdom) Danny Watts | Strakka-Dome S103 | M | 264 | Gearbox |
| DNF | LMP2 | 42 | (United Kingdom) Strakka Racing | (United Kingdom) Nick Leventis (United Kingdom) Jonny Kane (United Kingdom) Danny Watts | Nissan VK45DE 4.5 L V8 | M | 264 | Gearbox |
| DNF | LMGTE; Am | 55 | (Italy) AF Corse | (United Kingdom) Duncan Cameron (United Kingdom) Alex Mortimer (Republic of Ireland) Matt Griffin | Ferrari 458 Italia GT2 | M | 241 | Power |
| DNF | LMGTE; Am | 55 | (Italy) AF Corse | (United Kingdom) Duncan Cameron (United Kingdom) Alex Mortimer (Republic of Ireland) Matt Griffin | Ferrari 4.5 L V8 | M | 241 | Power |
| DNF | LMP1 | 23 | (Japan) Nissan Motorsports | (United Kingdom) Max Chilton (United Kingdom) Jann Mardenborough (France) Olivier Pla | Nissan GT-R LM Nismo | M | 234 | Gearbox |
| DNF | LMP1 | 23 | (Japan) Nissan Motorsports | (United Kingdom) Max Chilton (United Kingdom) Jann Mardenborough (France) Olivier Pla | Nissan VRX30A 3.0 L Turbo V6 | M | 234 | Gearbox |
| DNF | LMP2 | 46 | (France) Thiriet by TDS Racing | (France) Pierre Thiriet (France) Ludovic Badey (France) Tristan Gommendy | Oreca 05 | D | 204 | Crash |
| DNF | LMP2 | 46 | (France) Thiriet by TDS Racing | (France) Pierre Thiriet (France) Ludovic Badey (France) Tristan Gommendy | Nissan VK45DE 4.5 L V8 | D | 204 | Crash |
| DNF | LMGTE; Am | 96 | (United Kingdom) Aston Martin Racing | (Germany) Roald Goethe (United Kingdom) Stuart Hall (Italy) Francesco Castellacci | Aston Martin V8 Vantage GTE | M | 187 | Accident |
| DNF | LMGTE; Am | 96 | (United Kingdom) Aston Martin Racing | (Germany) Roald Goethe (United Kingdom) Stuart Hall (Italy) Francesco Castellacci | Aston Martin 4.5 L V8 | M | 187 | Accident |
| DNF | LMP2 | 43 | (Switzerland) Team SARD Morand | (France) Pierre Ragues (United Kingdom) Oliver Webb (Switzerland) Zoël Amberg | Morgan LMP2 Evo | D | 162 | Engine |
| DNF | LMP2 | 43 | (Switzerland) Team SARD Morand | (France) Pierre Ragues (United Kingdom) Oliver Webb (Switzerland) Zoël Amberg | SARD 3.6 L V8 | D | 162 | Engine |
| DNF | LMP1 | 21 | (Japan) Nissan Motorsports | (Japan) Tsugio Matsuda (Spain) Lucas Ordóñez (Russia) Mark Shulzhitskiy | Nissan GT-R LM Nismo | M | 115 | Suspension |
| DNF | LMP1 | 21 | (Japan) Nissan Motorsports | (Japan) Tsugio Matsuda (Spain) Lucas Ordóñez (Russia) Mark Shulzhitskiy | Nissan VRX30A 3.0 L Turbo V6 | M | 115 | Suspension |
| DNF | LMP2 | 36 | (France) Signatech Alpine | (France) Nelson Panciatici (France) Paul-Loup Chatin (France) Vincent Capillaire | Alpine A450b | D | 110 | Accident |
| DNF | LMP2 | 36 | (France) Signatech Alpine | (France) Nelson Panciatici (France) Paul-Loup Chatin (France) Vincent Capillaire | Nissan VK45DE 4.5 L V8 | D | 110 | Accident |
| DNF | LMGTE; Pro | 97 | (United Kingdom) Aston Martin Racing | (United Kingdom) Darren Turner (Germany) Stefan Mücke (United Kingdom) Rob Bell | Aston Martin V8 Vantage GTE | M | 110 | Engine |
| DNF | LMGTE; Pro | 97 | (United Kingdom) Aston Martin Racing | (United Kingdom) Darren Turner (Germany) Stefan Mücke (United Kingdom) Rob Bell | Aston Martin 4.5 L V8 | M | 110 | Engine |
| DNF | LMGTE; Am | 50 | (France) Larbre Compétition | (Italy) Gianluca Roda (Italy) Paolo Ruberti (Denmark) Kristian Poulsen | Chevrolet Corvette C7.R | M | 94 | Gearbox |
| DNF | LMGTE; Am | 50 | (France) Larbre Compétition | (Italy) Gianluca Roda (Italy) Paolo Ruberti (Denmark) Kristian Poulsen | Chevrolet 5.5 L V8 | M | 94 | Gearbox |
| DNF | LMP2 | 41 | (United Kingdom) Greaves Motorsport | (Switzerland) Gary Hirsch (United Kingdom) Jon Lancaster (France) Gaëtan Paletou | Gibson 015S | D | 71 | Power |
| DNF | LMP2 | 41 | (United Kingdom) Greaves Motorsport | (Switzerland) Gary Hirsch (United Kingdom) Jon Lancaster (France) Gaëtan Paletou | Nissan VK45DE 4.5 L V8 | D | 71 | Power |
| DNF | LMGTE; Am | 88 | (Germany) Abu Dhabi-Proton Racing | (Germany) Christian Ried (Austria) Klaus Bachler (United Arab Emirates) Khaled Al Qubaisi | Porsche 911 RSR | M | 44 | Fire |
| DNF | LMGTE; Am | 88 | (Germany) Abu Dhabi-Proton Racing | (Germany) Christian Ried (Austria) Klaus Bachler (United Arab Emirates) Khaled Al Qubaisi | Porsche 4.0 L Flat-6 | M | 44 | Fire |
| DNF | LMGTE; Pro | 92 | (Germany) Porsche Team Manthey | (France) Patrick Pilet (France) Frédéric Makowiecki (Germany) Wolf Henzler | Porsche 911 RSR | M | 14 | Fire |
| DNF | LMGTE; Pro | 92 | (Germany) Porsche Team Manthey | (France) Patrick Pilet (France) Frédéric Makowiecki (Germany) Wolf Henzler | Porsche 4.0 L Flat-6 | M | 14 | Fire |
| EX | LMP1 | 4 | (Austria) Team ByKolles | (Switzerland) Simon Trummer (Germany) Pierre Kaffer (Portugal) Tiago Monteiro | CLM P1/01 | M | 260 | Excluded (Note: The No. 4 ByKolles CLM-AER was excluded from the race for not having the correct driver weight ballast. Prior to the exclusion, the car was not classified in the race results for failing to complete 70 per cent of the overall winner's distance.) |
| EX | LMP1 | 4 | (Austria) Team ByKolles | (Switzerland) Simon Trummer (Germany) Pierre Kaffer (Portugal) Tiago Monteiro | AER P60 2.4 L Turbo V6 | M | 260 | Excluded |
| WD | LMGTE; Pro | 63 | (United States) Corvette Racing – GM | (Denmark) Jan Magnussen (Spain) Antonio García (Australia) Ryan Briscoe | Chevrolet Corvette C7.R | M | – | Withdrawn (Note: The No. 63 Corvette withdrew prior to the race due to damage caused by a crash in the second qualifying session that could not be repaired in time.) |
| WD | LMGTE; Pro | 63 | (United States) Corvette Racing – GM | (Denmark) Jan Magnussen (Spain) Antonio García (Australia) Ryan Briscoe | Chevrolet 5.5 L V8 | M | – | Withdrawn |

Tyre manufacturers
Key
| Symbol | Tyre manufacturer |
|---|---|
| **D** | Dunlop |
| **M** | Michelin |

== Standings after the race ==
World Endurance Drivers' Championship standings
| Pos. | +/– | Driver | Points |
|---|---|---|---|
| 1 | | (Germany) André Lotterer (Switzerland) Marcel Fässler (France) Benoît Tréluyer | 80 |
| 2 | 7 | (United Kingdom) Nick Tandy | 60 |
| 3 | 8 | (Germany) Nico Hülkenberg (New Zealand) Earl Bamber | 58 |
| 4 | 2 | (Germany) Marc Lieb (France) Romain Dumas (Switzerland) Neel Jani | 57 |
| 5 | | (Germany) Timo Bernhard (Australia) Mark Webber (New Zealand) Brendon Hartley | 53 |

World Endurance Manufacturers' Championship standings
| Pos. | +/– | Constructor | Points |
|---|---|---|---|
| 1 | 1 | (Germany) Porsche | 140 |
| 2 | 1 | (Germany) Audi | 124 |
| 3 | | (Japan) Toyota | 71 |
| 4 | | (Japan) Nissan | 0 |

- Note: Only the top five positions are included for the Drivers' Championship standings.

FIA World Endurance Championship
| Previous race: 6 Hours of Spa-Francorchamps | 2015 season | Next race: 6 Hours of Nürburgring |
