= Porsche V4 engine =

Porsche 9R9 V4 engine
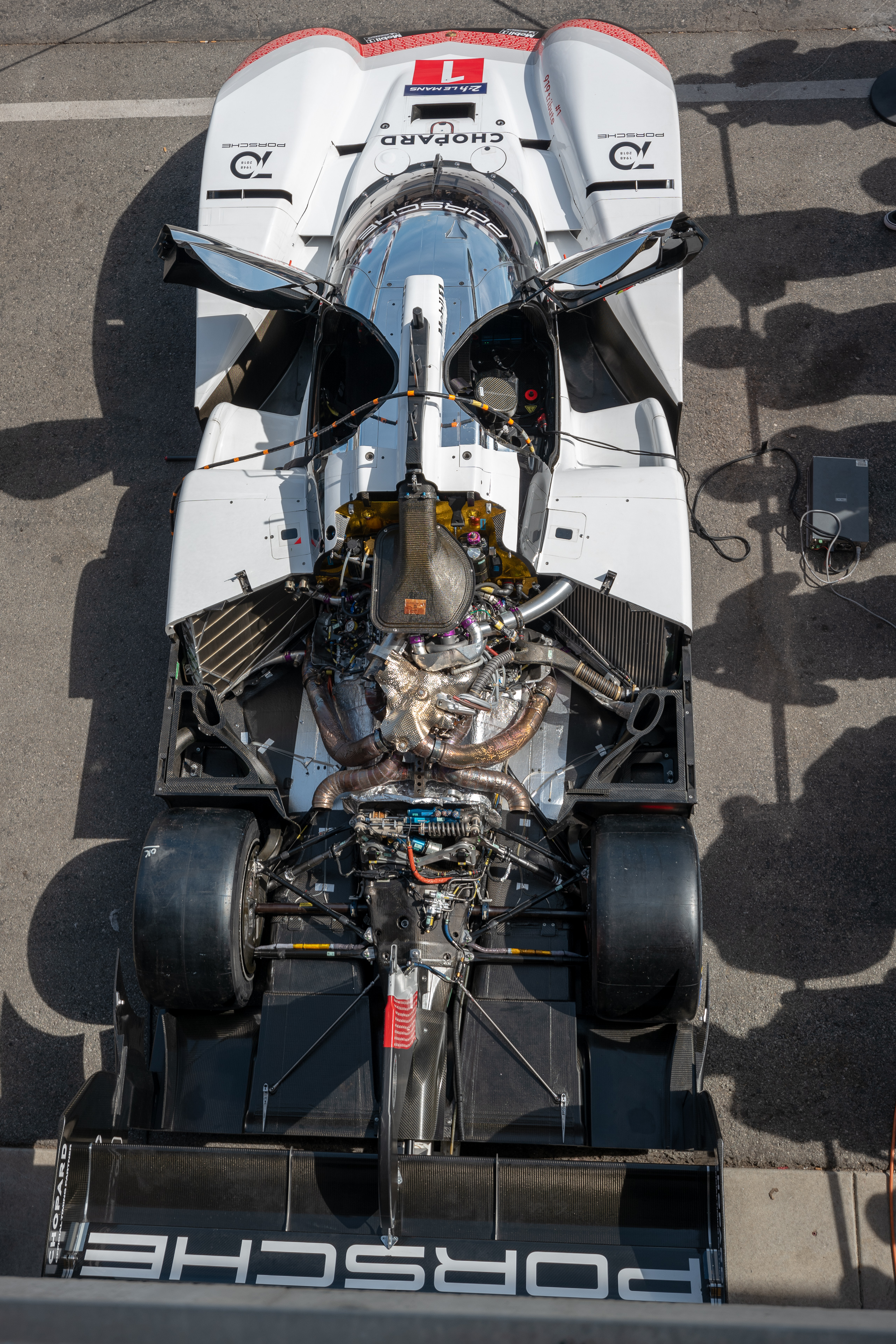
- The V4 engine visible on the 919 Evo in 2018

Overview
- Manufacturer: Porsche
- Production: 2014-2017

Layout
- Configuration: 90° V4
- Displacement: 1,994 cc (122 cu in)
- Cylinder bore: 92 mm (3.62 in)
- Piston stroke: 75 mm (2.95 in)
- Valvetrain: 16-valve, DOHC, four-valves per cylinder

Combustion
- Fuel system: Direct fuel injection
- Management: Bosch MS5
- Fuel type: 80% Gasoline with E20 Ethanol by Shell V-Power (WEC-mandated)
- Oil system: Dry sump. Mobil 1 lubrication
- Cooling system: Water-cooled

Output
- Power output: 500–720 hp (373–537 kW)

The Porsche 9R9 V4 engine is a two-liter, four-stroke, mono-turbocharged, V-4, racing engine, designed, developed and built by German manufacturer Porsche, for their 919 Hybrid sports car prototype, between 2014 and 2017.

== Background ==
The compact and lightweight engine was a two-litre (120 cu in) 90-degree V4 cylinder bank mid-mounted mono-turbocharged petrol engine. It ran at 9,000 rpm, with performance coming from a direct fuel-injection system and a single Garrett-designed turbocharger with a dual overhead camshaft. It produced approximately 500 hp (370 kW) and acted as a chassis load-bearing member. Due to the small size of the engine, the transmission casing was fitted to the rear suspension and was almost a third of the car's length. Engine air ingestion was achieved through a carbon-fiber-and-gold thermal wrapped airbox in its center. Front airflow was enabled by louvers along its flank, and a single curved roll-hoop intake was mounted on its roof to feed the carbon-fiber airbox.

== Applications ==
- Porsche 919 Hybrid
