= Jean-Christophe Boullion =

French racing driver (born 1969)

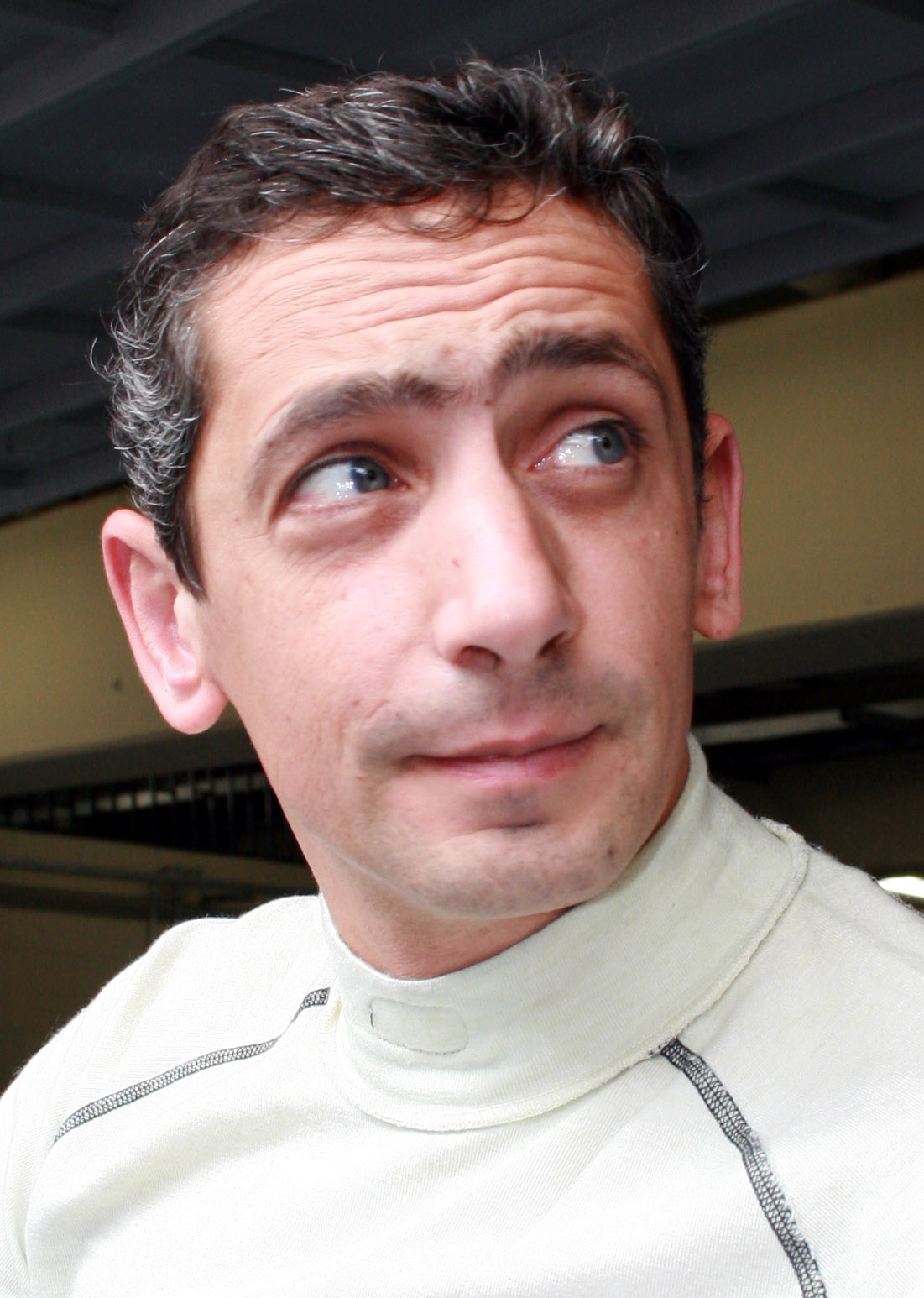
- Boullion in 2007
- Born: Jean-Christophe Joël Louis Boullion; 27 December 1969 (age 56) Saint-Brieuc, France
- Categorisation: FIA Platinum

Formula One World Championship career
- Nationality: (France) French
- Active years: 1995
- Team: Sauber
- Entries: 11
- Championships: 0
- Wins: 0
- Podiums: 0
- Career points: 3
- Pole positions: 0
- Fastest laps: 0
- First entry: 1995 Monaco Grand Prix
- Last entry: 1995 Pacific Grand Prix

24 Hours of Le Mans career
- Years: 1994, 1997–1998, 2000–2003, 2005, 2007–2011
- Teams: Michel Hommell, DAMS, JB Racing, Racing Organisation Course (ROC), Pescarolo Sport, Rebellion Racing
- Best finish: 2nd (2005)
- Class wins: 0

Championship titles
- 2005–06 1994: Le Mans Series; International F3000

Jean-Christophe Joël Louis "Jules" Boullion (born 27 December 1969) is a French former racing driver. He won the 1994 International Formula 3000 Championship with DAMS, took two Le Mans Series titles with the Pescarolo Sport outfit in 2005 and 2006, and took two podium finishes at the 24 Hours of Le Mans. Boullion also competed in 11 Formula One races for the Sauber team.

== Career ==
=== Junior formulae ===
Born in Saint-Brieuc, near Côtes d'Armor, Boullion started karting in 1982 and moved to cars in 1988 after attending a racing school outside Paris. He started racing in his national Formula Ford 1600 series in 1989, finishing third overall. The following year, he won the French title in dominant fashion. Boullion then moved to French Formula 3, placing sixth in 1991 and fourth (with three victories) in 1992. In 1993, Boullion entered the International Formula 3000 Championship. Racing for Apomatox, Boullion placed eighth in the standings after finishing the season with a pair of second places. Heading into the 1994 season, Boullion switched to DAMS. After a slow start to the campaign, Boullion went on a streak of four podiums at the end of the year, which included winning the final three races — allowing him to narrowly beat Franck Lagorce and Gil de Ferran to the title.

=== Formula One stint ===
Boullion signed for Williams to become a test driver ahead of the 1995 Formula One season. However, Boullion would be loaned out to Sauber to replace Karl Wendlinger for a majority of the season, starting with the Monaco Grand Prix. Despite crashing at the Nouvelle Chicane during practice and at Massenet in qualifying, Boullion finished the race in eighth, having spun off with two laps to go. He spun out of the next race in Canada, before retiring from the French Grand Prix with a gearbox issue. In Britain, Boullion finished tenth. At the German Grand Prix meanwhile, Boullion profited from several engine-related retirements ahead of him to score his first points in Formula One, finishing fifth. After two scoreless races, Boullion placed sixth in Italy, having overtaken Max Papis on the final lap. His final two races ended in retirement; Boullion collided with Mika Salo at the Nürburgring and spun out at the Pacific Grand Prix, which Boullion blamed on Pedro Lamy weaving ahead of him.

In 1996, Boullion returned to his Williams testing role, having been overlooked for a full-time Sauber seat in favour of Johnny Herbert due to his relative inexperience. At the end of 1996, Boullion tested for the Jordan team. He remained the Williams test driver in 1997. Boullion then became Tyrrell's test driver for the 1998 season.

=== Touring car racing and first Le Mans ventures ===
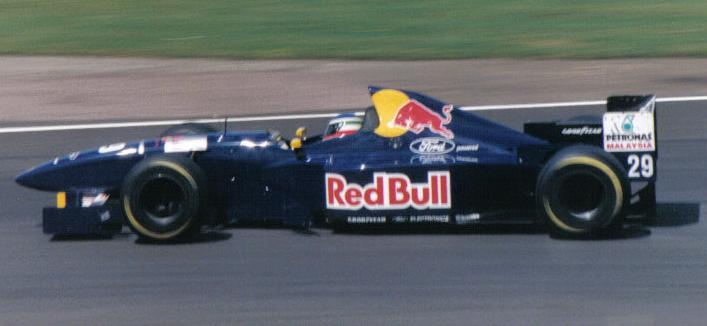
Boullion driving for Sauber at the 1995 British Grand Prix.

In 1997, Boullion raced in the Renault Spider Eurocup, finishing fourth with two wins. Having made his 24 Hours of Le Mans debut in 1994, Boullion joined his former F3000 team DAMS in the GT1 class in 1997; he retired from both events. Boullion raced for JB Racing in the LMP1 category in 1998, though he and his teammates retired with a gearbox failure. During 1999, Boullion contested the British Touring Car Championship. Driving for Williams at the wheel of a Renault Laguna, Boullion scored a lone podium at Silverstone and finished tenth in the standings.

=== Endurance prototype success ===
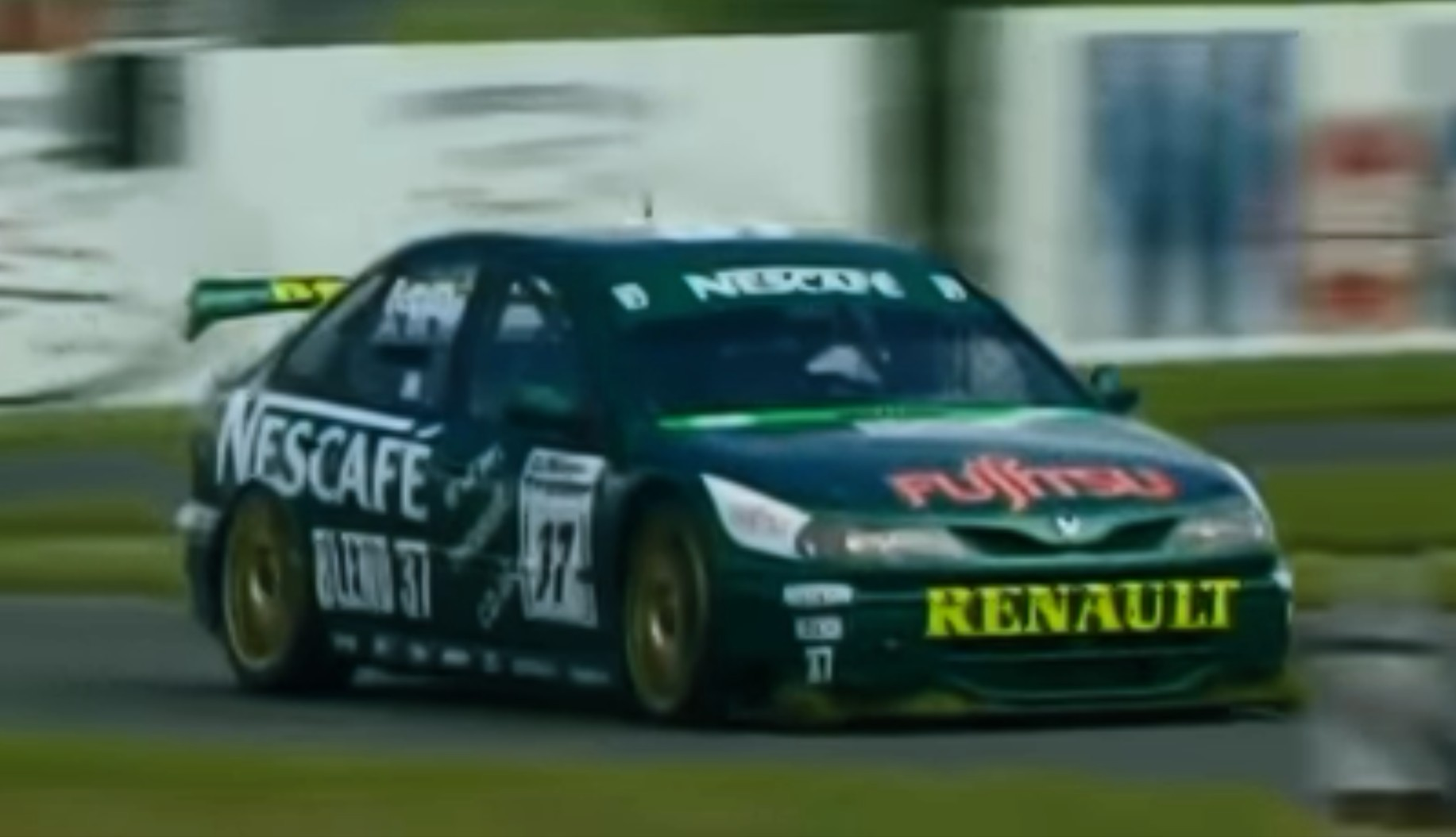
Boullion competing in the 1999 British Touring Car Championship

From 2000 onward, Boullion would turn his focus to prototype racing. Having raced at Le Mans with Racing Organisation Course in 2000, the Frenchman moved to the Pescarolo Sport outfit the following year, taking a first success with a win at Magny-Cours in the FIA Sportscar Championship. He remained in the series for the 2002 season, winning the opening and final race respectively alongside Sébastien Bourdais, though Boullion missed out on the title to Racing for Holland after missing the round at Brno. After returning for two races in 2003 to take a victory at Estoril, Boullion did not race at all in 2004 as a result of the FIA Sportscar Championship's demise. In 2005, he returned to race in the newer Le Mans Endurance Series, partnering Emmanuel Collard at Pescarolo. The duo ended up as title winners with two victories to their names, beating Zytek Motorsport by just two points. In the same year, Boullion and Collard, along with endurance-race teammate Érik Comas finished second overall at the Le Mans 24 Hours. The 2006 season proved to be a particular highlight for Boullion despite not racing at Le Mans, as he would win all five races in the Le Mans Series together with Collard on their way to a successful title defence.

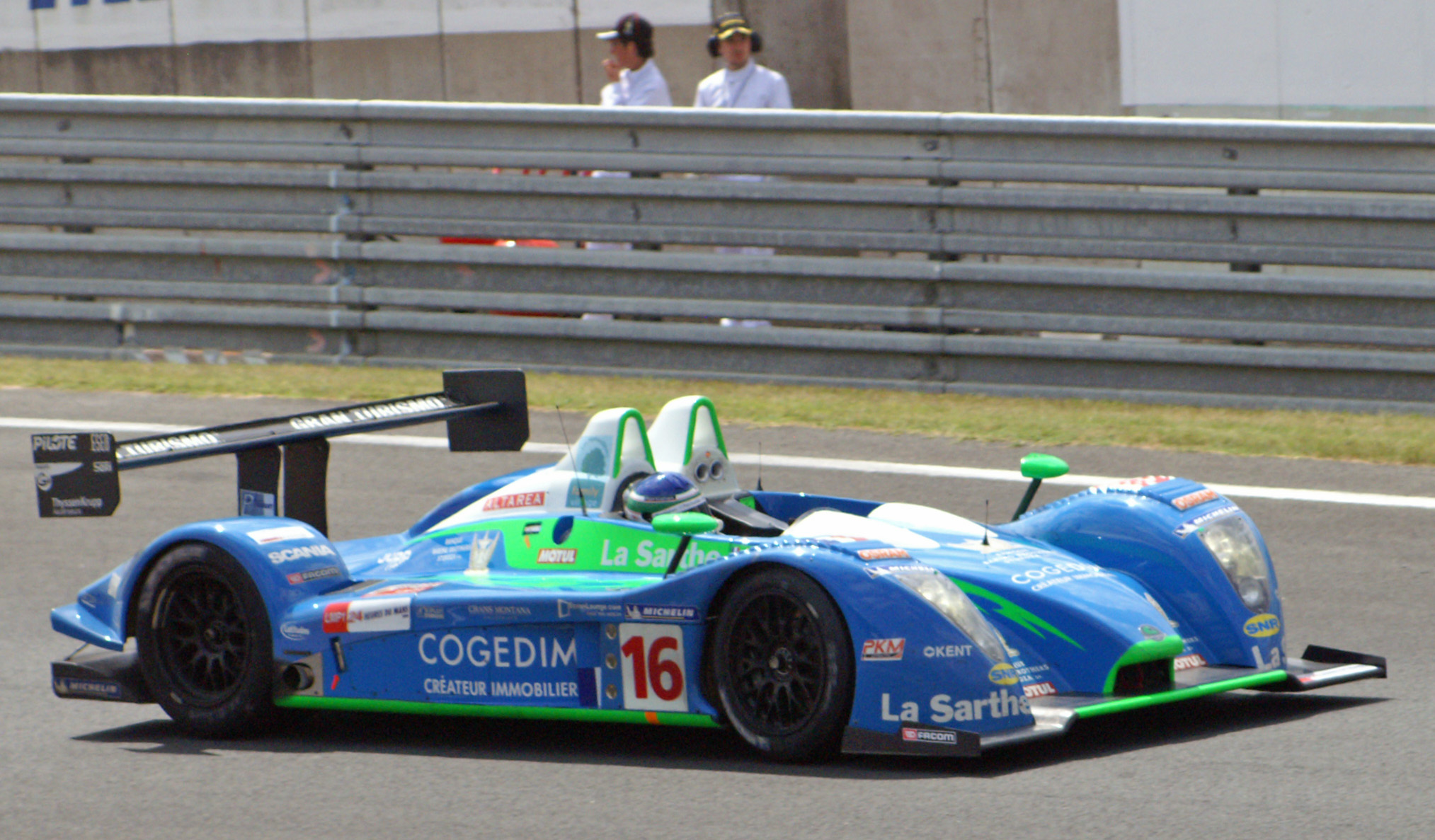
Boullion driving at the 2008 24 Hours of Le Mans

From the 2007 season, things would become more difficult for Boullion and Pescarolo, as they would now have to compete as a privateer against their factory outfit in Team Peugeot. Though the title battle lasted until the final round owing to Peugeot's non-participation at Silverstone, the factory team came out victorious, with Boullion having to settle for the runner-up spot with four podiums from six events. At Le Mans, Boullion scored his second and final podium at the Sarthe, coming third behind the Audi and Peugeot works entries. The former would pose a further threat in the Le Mans Series in 2008, as Audi entered two cars into the championship, with Boullion still driving for the Pescarolo privateer. Having scored one podium at the end of the year, Boullion ended up sixth in the points battle.

In 2009, Boullion was joined by Christophe Tinseau, with whom he would take two second places at the start of the campaign before winning at the Algarve. However, a retirement at the Nürburgring would cost the pair dearly, as it handed the title advantage to Aston Martin Racing, who would take the championship at the final round, leaving Boullion and his teammate in second.

Boullion moved to Rebellion Racing ahead of the 2010 season, where he and Andrea Belicchi scored a sole podium. The pair remained together for 2011 as a pair of podiums landed them second in the standings, just three points behind the title-winning Pescarolo squad. Subsequently, Boullion would return there for 2012, driving in the opening round of the FIA World Endurance Championship at Sebring. He was later slated to race at Le Mans, but a practice crash which damaged his ribs would sideline him from the race.

== Racing record ==
=== Complete International Formula 3000 results ===
(key) (Races in bold indicate pole position) (Races in italics indicate fastest lap)

Year	Entrant	Chassis	Engine	1	2	3	4	5	6	7	8	9	DC	Points
1993	Apomatox	Reynard 93D	Ford Cosworth	DON; 7	SIL; Ret	PAU; Ret	PER; Ret	HOC; Ret	NÜR; 9	SPA; Ret	MAG; 2	NOG; 2	8th	12
1994	DAMS	Reynard 94D	Ford Cosworth	SIL; 8	PAU; 4	CAT; Ret	PER; 14	HOC; 2	SPA; 1	EST; 1	MAG; 1		1st	36

=== Complete Formula One results ===
(key)

Year	Entrant	Chassis	Engine	1	2	3	4	5	6	7	8	9	10	11	12	13	14	15	16	17	WDC	Points
1995	Red Bull Sauber Ford	Sauber C14	Ford V8	BRA	ARG	SMR	ESP	MON; 8†	CAN; Ret	FRA; Ret	GBR; 9	GER; 5	HUN; 10	BEL; 11	ITA; 6	POR; 12	EUR; Ret	PAC; Ret	JPN	AUS	16th	3

† Driver did not finish the race, but was still classified as they completed 90% of the race distance.

=== Complete British Touring Car Championship results ===
(key) (Races in bold indicate pole position – 1 point awarded all races) (Races in italics indicate fastest lap) (* signifies that driver lead feature race for at least one lap – 1 point awarded)

Year	Team	Car	1	2	3	4	5	6	7	8	9	10	11	12	13	14	15	16	17	18	19	20	21	22	23	24	25	26	Pos	Pts
1999	Blend 37 Williams Renault	Renault Laguna	DON; 1 Ret	DON; 2; 6	SIL; 1; 8	SIL; 2; 3	THR; 1; 9	THR; 2; 7*	BRH; 1; 5	BRH; 2; 7	OUL; 1; 6	OUL; 2; 6	DON; 1; 8	DON; 2; 10	CRO; 1; 11	CRO; 2 Ret	SNE; 1; 5	SNE; 2; 4	THR; 1; 13	THR; 2; 11	KNO; 1; 5	KNO; 2; 4	BRH; 1; 7	BRH; 2; 6	OUL; 1; 7	OUL; 2; 7	SIL; 1; 8	SIL; 2 Ret	10th	97

=== 24 Hours of Le Mans results ===
Year	Team	Co-Drivers	Car	Class	Laps	Pos.	Class Pos.
1994	(France) Michel Hommell	(France) Alain Cudini (France) Éric Hélary	Bugatti EB110 SS	GT1	230	DNF	DNF
1997	(France) DAMS	(France) Franck Lagorce (France) Éric Bernard	Panoz Esperante GTR-1	GT1	149	DNF	DNF
1998	(France) JB Racing	(Italy) Vincenzo Sospiri (France) Jérôme Policand	Ferrari 333 SP	LMP1	187	DNF	DNF
2000	(France) Racing Organisation Course	(Spain) Jordi Gené (France) Jérôme Policand	Reynard 2KQ-LM-Volkswagen	LMP675	72	DNF	DNF
2001	(France) Pescarolo Sport	(France) Sébastien Bourdais (France) Laurent Rédon	Courage C60-Peugeot	LMP900	271	13th	4th
2002	(France) Pescarolo Sport	(France) Sébastien Bourdais (France) Franck Lagorce	Courage C60-Peugeot	LMP900	343	10th	9th
2003	(France) Pescarolo Sport	(France) Stéphane Sarrazin (France) Franck Lagorce	Courage C60-Peugeot	LMP900	356	8th	6th
2005	(France) Pescarolo Sport	(France) Emmanuel Collard (France) Érik Comas	Pescarolo C60 Hybrid-Judd	LMP1	368	**2nd**	**2nd**
2007	(France) Pescarolo Sport	(France) Emmanuel Collard (France) Romain Dumas	Pescarolo 01-Judd	LMP1	358	**3rd**	**3rd**
2008	(France) Pescarolo Sport	(France) Emmanuel Collard (France) Romain Dumas	Pescarolo 01-Judd	LMP1	238	DNF	DNF
2009	(France) Pescarolo Sport	(France) Simon Pagenaud (France) Benoît Tréluyer	Peugeot 908 HDi FAP	LMP1	210	DNF	DNF
2010	(Switzerland) Rebellion Racing	(Italy) Andrea Belicchi (United Kingdom) Guy Smith	Lola B10/60-Rebellion	LMP1	143	DNF	DNF
2011	(Switzerland) Rebellion Racing	(Italy) Andrea Belicchi (United Kingdom) Guy Smith	Lola B10/60-Toyota	LMP1	190	DNF	DNF

=== Complete European Le Mans Series results ===
(key) (Races in bold indicate pole position; races in italics indicate fastest lap)

Year	Entrant	Class	Car	Engine	1	2	3	4	5	6	7	Pos.	Points
2001	Pescarolo Sport	LMP900	Courage C60	Peugeot A32 3.2L Turbo V6	SEB; Ret	DON; 4	JAR	EST; 1	MOS	VAL		7th	66
2001	Petersen Motorsports	GT	Porsche 911 GT3-R	Porsche 3.6L Flat-6							PET; 6	NC	0
2005	Pescarolo Sport	LMP1	Pescarolo C60 Hybrid	Judd GV5 5.0L V10	**SPA**; 2	MNZ; 1	SIL; 8	NÜR; 4	**IST**; 1			1st	34
2006	Pescarolo Sport	LMP1	Pescarolo C60 Hybrid	Judd GV5 S2 5.0L V10	**IST**; 1	SPA; 1	NÜR; 1	DON; 1	**JAR**; 1			1st	50
2007	Pescarolo Sport	LMP1	Pescarolo 01	Judd GV5.5 S2 5.5 L V10	MNZ; 2	VAL; 5	NÜR; 3	SPA; 2	SIL; 2	INT; 4		3rd	36.5
2008	Pescarolo Sport	LMP1	Pescarolo 01	Judd GV5.5 S2 5.5 L V10	CAT; 4	MNZ; Ret	SPA; 5	NÜR; Ret	SIL; 3			11th	15
2009	Pescarolo Sport	LMP1	Pescarolo 01	Judd GV5.5 S2 5.5 L V10	CAT; 2	SPA; 2	ALG; 1	NÜR; Ret	SIL; 10			4th	26
2010	Rebellion Racing	LMP1	Lola B10/60	Rebellion (Judd) 5.5 L V10	LEC; 3	SPA; 6	ALG; 4	HUN; Ret	SIL; 10			10th	44
2011	Rebellion Racing	LMP1	Lola B10/60	Toyota RV8KLM 3.4 L V8	LEC; 2	SPA; 9	IMO; 5	SIL; 4	EST; 2			2nd	47

=== Complete FIA World Endurance Championship results ===
Year	Entrant	Class	Chassis	Engine	1	2	3	4	5	6	7	8	Rank	Points
2012	Pescarolo Team	LMP1	Pescarolo 01	Judd GV5 S2 5.0 L (V8)	SEB; 5	SPA	LMS; DNS	SIL	SAO	BHR	FUJ	SHA	28th	10

Sporting positions
Preceded by Olivier Panis	International Formula 3000; Champion; 1994	Succeeded by Vincenzo Sospiri
Preceded by Johnny Herbert; Jamie Davies	Le Mans Series; Champion; 2005-2006; With: Emmanuel Collard	Succeeded by Stéphane Sarrazin; Pedro Lamy
