= Andrea Belicchi =

Italian professional racing driver

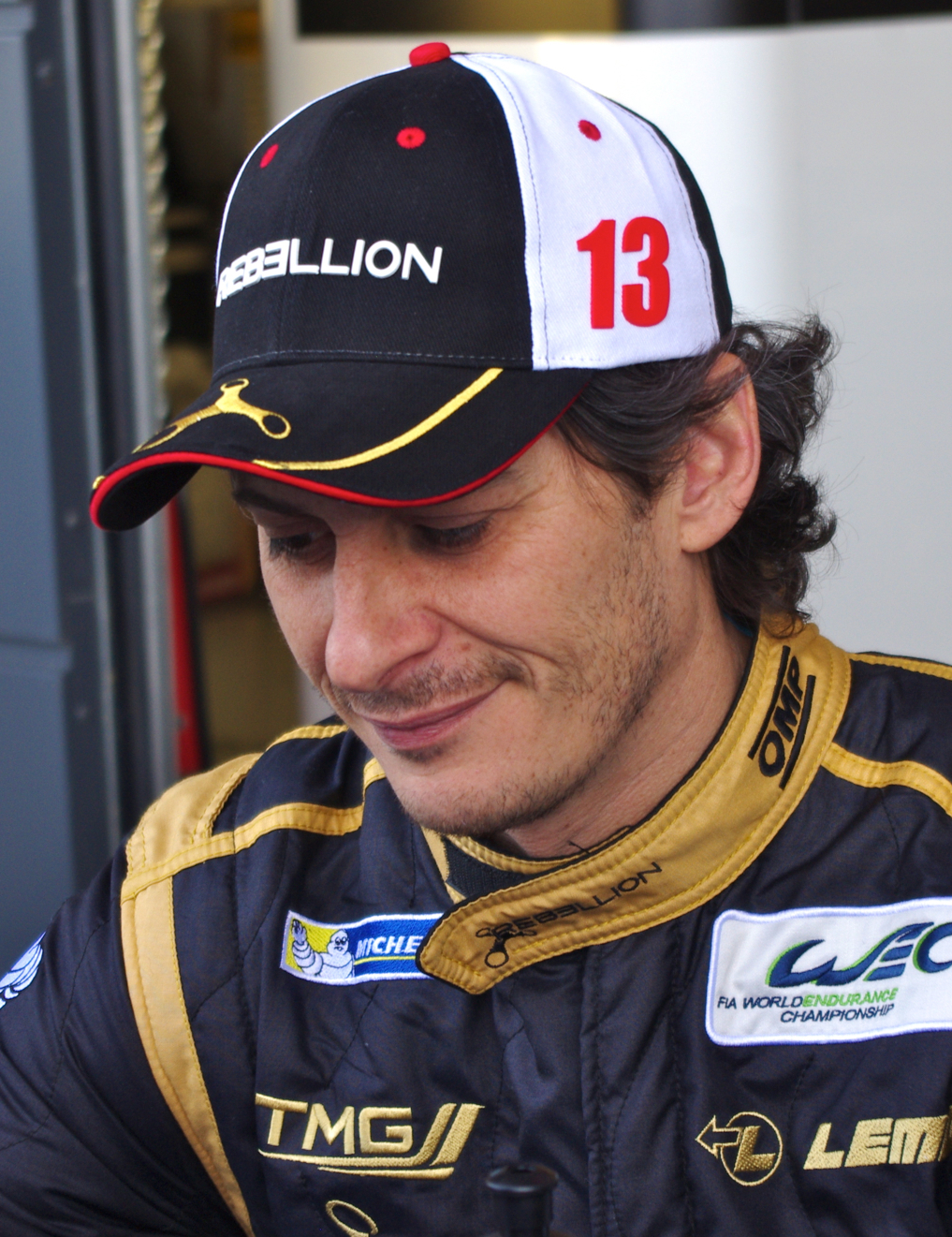
- Belicchi at the 2013 6 Hours of Silverstone
- Nationality: ITA
- Born: 18 December 1976 (age 49) Parma, Italy

Porsche Supercup career
- Current team: Centro Porsche Padova
- Categorisation: FIA Platinum (until 2016); FIA Gold (2017–)
- Car number: 30

Championship titles
- 1998 2002 2003: Renault Sport Spider Elf Trophy; Russian Formula 3 Finnish Formula 3
24 Hours of Le Mans career
- Years: 2007 –
- Teams: Spyker Squadron, Speedy Racing Team Sebah, Rebellion Racing
- Best finish: 11th (2012)
- Class wins: 0

Andrea Belicchi (born 18 December 1976) is an Italian professional racing driver. He has competed in such series as the Porsche Supercup, Le Mans Series and FIA World Endurance Championship.

Belicchi won the Russian Formula Three Championship in 2002 and Finnish Formula Three Championship in 2003 with Lukoil Racing and previously the Renault Sport Spider Elf Trophy in 1998. He also competed in Italian Formula 3000 and Formula Renault V6 Eurocup before switching to sports car racing.

Belicchi was the GTS class champion in 2006 International GT Open along with Stefano Zonca. Also in 2006, he got a GT2 class win at the 2006 1000 km of Nürburgring on a GPC Ferrari. In 2007, he drove a Spyker at the Le Mans Series. In 2008, he switched to the LMP2 class, finishing second in class at the 1000 km of Catalunya. In 2009, he progressed to the LMP1 class, where he took a second overall finish at the 1000 km of Silverstone.

For the 2010 Le Mans Series, Belicchi switched to Rebellion Racing. Driving a Lola-Judd, he finished third overall at the 2010 8 Hours of Castellet. After several teams defected to the Intercontinental Le Mans Cup, Belicchi took two second-place finishes in the Le Mans Series with Jean-Christophe Boullion as partner, and was runner-up in the LMP1 class.

As the LMP1 class was dropped from the 2012 Le Mans Series program, Belicchi stayed with Rebellion at the new FIA World Endurance Championship, driving a Lola-Toyota with Harold Primat. With two fourth-place finishes at Silverstone and Shanghai, he was 16th in the drivers standings. In 2013, he continued with Rebellion at the LMP1 class, finishing third at Fuji and fourth at Shanghai. In 2014, he finished sixth overall at Bahrain and eighth at Shanghai. With three class wins, he ended as LMP1 Private Teams runner-up behind his teammates.

In 2015, Belicchi switched to touring cars, as he joined the TCR International Series with a SEAT León.

== Racing record ==
=== Complete 24 Hours of Le Mans results ===
| Year | Team | Co-Drivers | Car | Class | Laps | Pos. | Class Pos. |
|---|---|---|---|---|---|---|---|
| 2007 | (Netherlands) Spyker Squadron b.v. | (Switzerland) Andrea Chiesa (Italy) Alex Caffi | Spyker C8 Spyder GT2-R | GT2 | 145 | DNF | DNF |
| 2008 | (Switzerland) Speedy Racing Team (United Kingdom) Sebah Automotive | (Switzerland) Steve Zacchia (France) Xavier Pompidou | Lola B08/80-Judd | LMP2 | 194 | DNF | DNF |
| 2009 | (Switzerland) Speedy Racing Team (United Kingdom) Sebah Automotive | (France) Nicolas Prost (Switzerland) Neel Jani | Lola B08/60-Aston Martin | LMP1 | 342 | 14th | 12th |
| 2010 | (Switzerland) Rebellion Racing | (France) Jean-Christophe Boullion (United Kingdom) Guy Smith | Lola B10/60-Rebellion | LMP1 | 143 | DNF | DNF |
| 2011 | (Switzerland) Rebellion Racing | (France) Jean-Christophe Boullion (United Kingdom) Guy Smith | Lola B10/60-Toyota | LMP1 | 190 | DNF | DNF |
| 2012 | (Switzerland) Rebellion Racing | (Netherlands) Jeroen Bleekemolen (Switzerland) Harold Primat | Lola B12/60-Toyota | LMP1 | 350 | 11th | 7th |
| 2013 | (Switzerland) Rebellion Racing | (Switzerland) Mathias Beche (China) Congfu Cheng | Lola B12/60-Toyota | LMP1 | 275 | 40th | 8th |
| 2014 | (Switzerland) Rebellion Racing | (Austria) Dominik Kraihamer (Switzerland) Fabio Leimer | Rebellion R-One-Toyota | LMP1-L | 73 | DNF | DNF |
| 2017 | (Italy) Cetilar Villorba Corse | (Italy) Roberto Lacorte (Italy) Giorgio Sernagiotto | Dallara P217-Gibson | LMP2 | 353 | 9th | 7th |
| 2019 | (Italy) Cetilar Villorba Corse | (Italy) Roberto Lacorte (Italy) Giorgio Sernagiotto | Dallara P217-Gibson | LMP2 | 352 | 18th | 13th |
| 2020 | (Italy) Cetilar Racing | (Italy) Roberto Lacorte (Italy) Giorgio Sernagiotto | Dallara P217-Gibson | LMP2 | 363 | 14th | 10th |

=== Complete European Le Mans Series results ===
| Year | Entrant | Class | Chassis | Engine | 1 | 2 | 3 | 4 | 5 | 6 | Rank | Points |
|---|---|---|---|---|---|---|---|---|---|---|---|---|
| 2006 | GPC Sport | GT2 | Ferrari F430GT | Ferrari 4.0L V8 | IST | SPA | **NÜR**; 1 | DON; Ret | JAR | | 13th | 10 |
| 2007 | Speedy Racing Team | GT2 | Spyker C8 Spyder GT2-R | Audi 3.8 L V8 | MNZ; 7 | VAL; Ret | NÜR; 5 | SPA; 8 | SIL; 4 | INT; 7 | 13th | 14 |
| 2008 | Speedy Racing Team | LMP2 | Lola B08/80 | Judd DB 3.4 L V8 | CAT; 2 | MNZ; 9 | SPA; NC | NÜR; 9 | SIL; Ret | | 15th | 8 |
| 2009 | Speedy Racing Team Sebah Automotive | LMP1 | Lola B08/60 | Aston Martin 6.0 L V12 | CAT; 7 | SPA; 8 | ALG; Ret | NÜR; 6 | SIL; 2 | | 10th | 14 |
| 2010 | Rebellion Racing | LMP1 | Lola B10/60 | Rebellion (Judd) 5.5 L V10 | LEC; 3 | SPA; 6 | ALG; 4 | HUN; Ret | SIL; 10 | | 10th | 44 |
| 2011 | Rebellion Racing | LMP1 | Lola B10/60 | Toyota RV8KLM 3.4 L V8 | LEC; 2 | SPA; 9 | IMO; 5 | SIL; 4 | EST; 2 | | 2nd | 47 |
| 2017 | Cetilar Villorba Corse | LMP2 | Dallara P217 | Gibson GK428 4.2 L V8 | SIL; 6 | MNZ; 5 | RBR; Ret | LEC; 10 | SPA; 7 | ALG; 5 | 14th | 35 |
| 2018 | Cetilar Villorba Corse | LMP2 | Dallara P217 | Gibson GK428 4.2 L V8 | LEC; 14 | MNZ | RBR | SIL | SPA | ALG | 32nd | 0.5 |
| 2019 | Cetilar R. Villorba Corse | LMP2 | Dallara P217 | Gibson GK428 4.2 L V8 | LEC | MNZ; Ret | CAT | SIL | SPA | ALG | 36th | 0 |

=== Complete FIA World Endurance Championship results ===
| Year | Entrant | Class | Chassis | Engine | 1 | 2 | 3 | 4 | 5 | 6 | 7 | 8 | Rank | Points |
|---|---|---|---|---|---|---|---|---|---|---|---|---|---|---|
| 2012 | Rebellion Racing | LMP1 | Lola B12/60 | Toyota RV8KLM 3.4 L V8 | SEB; 19 | SPA; 5 | LMS; 9 | SIL; 4 | SÃO; 6 | BHR; 5 | FUJ; 7 | SHA; 4 | 8th | 62.5 |
| 2013 | Rebellion Racing | LMP1 | Lola B12/60 | Toyota RV8KLM 3.4 L V8 | SIL; 5 | SPA; 5 | LMS; 13 | SÃO | COA | FUJ; 3 | SHA; 4 | BHR; Ret | 13th | 36.5 |
| 2014 | Rebellion Racing | LMP1 | Lola B12/60 | Toyota RV8KLM 3.4 L V8 | SIL; Ret | SPA; Ret | LMS; Ret | COA; Ret | FUJ; 10 | SHA; 8 | BHR; 6 | SÃO; 7 | 17th | 19 |
| 2019–20 | Cetilar Racing | LMP2 | Dallara P217 | Gibson GK428 4.2 L V8 | SIL; 6 | FUJ; 7 | SHA; 7 | BHR; 8 | COA; 8 | SPA; 5 | LMS; 5 | BHR; 6 | 12th | 72 |

=== Complete TCR International Series results ===
(key) (Races in bold indicate pole position) (Races in italics indicate fastest lap)

| Year | Team | Car | 1 | 2 | 3 | 4 | 5 | 6 | 7 | 8 | 9 | 10 | 11 | 12 | 13 | 14 | 15 | 16 | 17 | 18 | 19 | 20 | 21 | 22 | DC | Points |
|---|---|---|---|---|---|---|---|---|---|---|---|---|---|---|---|---|---|---|---|---|---|---|---|---|---|---|
| 2015 | Target Competition | SEAT León Cup Racer | SEP; 1; 5 | SEP; 2; 5 | SHA; 1; 5 | **SHA**; **2**; 1 | VAL; 1; 4 | VAL; 2 DSQ | ALG; 1; 12 | ALG; 2; 10 | MNZ; 1; 3 | MNZ; 2; 5 | SAL; 1; 3 | SAL; 2; 5 | SOC; 1; 3 | SOC; 2 Ret | RBR; 1; 2 | RBR; 2; 11† | MRN; 1 | MRN; 2 | CHA; 1 | CHA; 2 | MAC; 1; 8 | MAC; 2; 2 | 6th | 186 |
| 2016 | Target Competition | Opel Astra TCR | BHR; 1; 14 | BHR; 2 Ret | EST; 1 | EST; 2 | SPA; 1 | SPA; 2 | IMO; 1 | IMO; 2 | SAL; 1 | SAL; 2 | OSC; 1 | OSC; 2 | SOC; 1 | SOC; 2 | CHA; 1 | CHA; 2 | MRN; 1 | MRN; 2 | SEP; 1 | SEP; 2 | | | 28th | 4 |
| 2016 | Mulsanne Racing | Alfa Romeo Giulietta TCR | | | | | | | | | | | | | | | | | | | | | MAC; 1; 8 | MAC; 2; 9 | 28th | 4 |

^{†} Driver did not finish the race, but was classified as he completed over 75% of the race distance.

=== Complete WeatherTech SportsCar Championship results ===
(key) (Races in bold indicate pole position; races in italics indicate fastest lap)

| Year | Entrant | Class | Make | Engine | 1 | 2 | 3 | 4 | 5 | 6 | 7 | Rank | Points | Ref |
|---|---|---|---|---|---|---|---|---|---|---|---|---|---|---|
| 2021 | Cetilar Racing | LMP2 | Dallara P217 | Gibson GK428 4.2 L V8 | DAY; 6† | SEB | WGL | WGL | ELK | LGA | PET | NC† | 0† | |

^{†} Points only counted towards the Michelin Endurance Cup, and not the overall LMP2 Championship.

=== Complete Le Mans Cup results ===
(key) (Races in bold indicate pole position) (Races in italics indicate the fastest lap)

| Year | Entrant | Car | Class | 1 | 2 | 3 | 4 | 5 | 6 | 7 | DC | Points | Ref |
|---|---|---|---|---|---|---|---|---|---|---|---|---|---|
| 2020 | Kessel Racing | Ferrari 488 GT3 | GT3 | LEC1 | SPA | LEC2; 4 | LMS; 1 | LMS; 2 | MNZ | ALG | NC† | 0† | |
| 2025 | Kessel Racing | Ferrari 296 GT3 | GT3 | BAR; 3 | **LEC**; 3 | LMS; 1; 4 | LMS; 2; 9 | **SPA**; 6 | SIL; 4 | ALG | 3rd* | 67* | |

^{†} Even though Belicchi was eligible to score championship points, he does not appear in the official final championship classification after Portimão.
^{*} Season still in progress.

Sporting positions
| Preceded by Tommy Rustad | Renault Sport Spider Elf Trophy; Champion; 1998 | Succeeded by Jérôme Policand (Renault Sport Clio Trophy) |
