= Guy Smith (racing driver) =

British racing driver (born 1974)

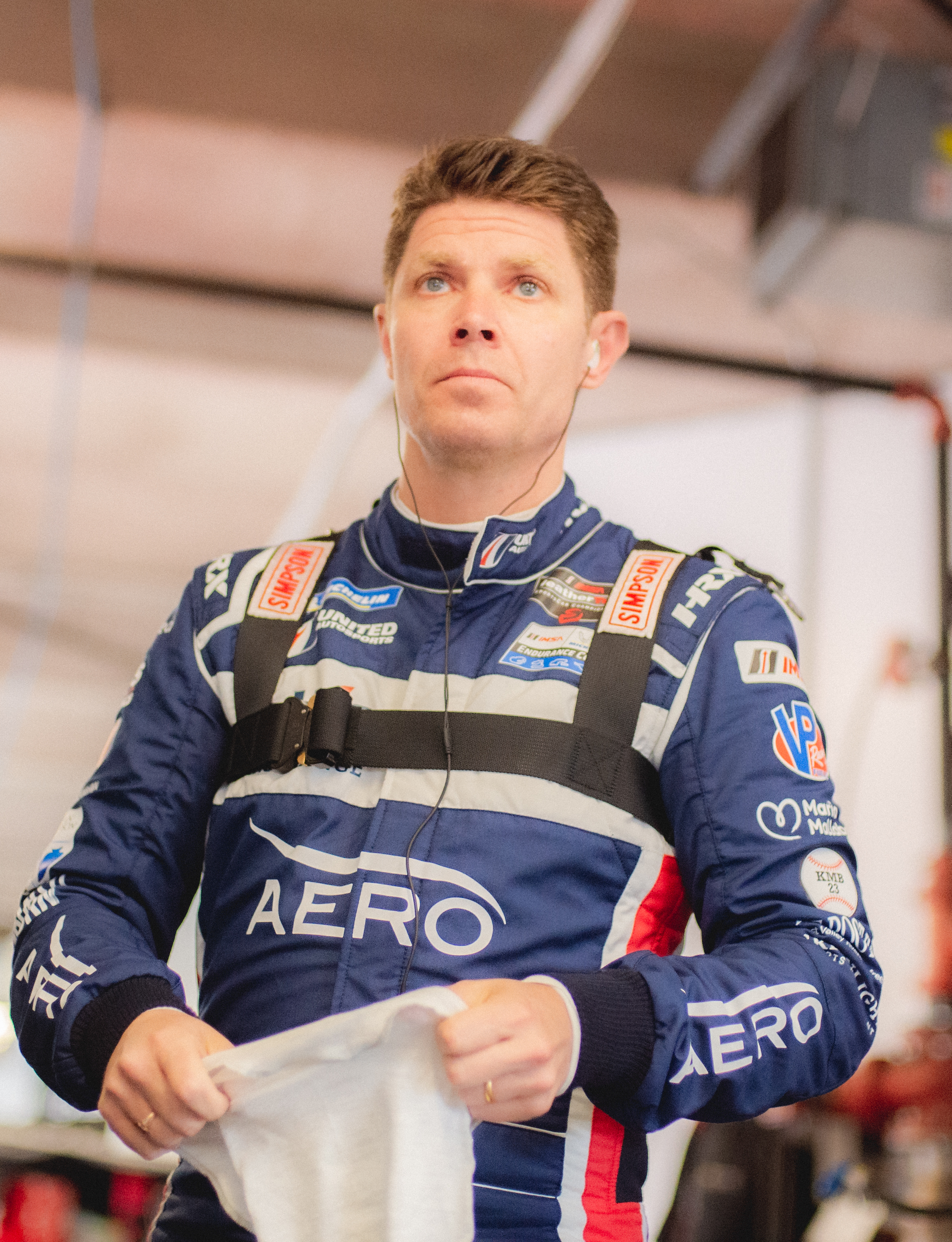
- Smith at the 2022 24 Hours of Daytona.
- Nationality: (United Kingdom) British
- Born: Guy James Mutlow Smith; 12 September 1974 (age 52) Beverley, Yorkshire, England
- Categorisation: FIA Platinum (until 2018); FIA Gold (2019–)

24 Hours of Le Mans career
- Years: 2000, 2001, 2003, 2004, 2008, 2009, 2010, 2011
- Teams: Johansson-Matthews Racing, Team Bentley, Audi Sport UK Team Veloqx, Quifel ASM Team, Rebellion Racing
- Best finish: 1st (2003)
- Class wins: 1 (2003)

Guy James Mutlow Smith (born 12 September 1974) is a British professional racing driver, who has competed in various levels of motorsport, most notably the 24 Hours of Le Mans, which he won in 2003, and the American Le Mans Series, which he won in 2011.

== Racing career ==
=== Early career ===
Born in Beverley, Smith started racing karts in 1986, becoming champion in the British Junior, Protrain Junior, and Scottish Open series a year later. In 1988, he was crowned Belgian Junior kart champion and in 1991 finished second in the Senior World Championship. In 1991, he entered his first car race, competing in the Formula First Winter Series, finishing second overall, competed in the New Zealand Formula Ford Championship, was CRG Factory Driver in karting, and was named McLaren Autosport Young Kartist of the Year. In 1992 he entered Formula Vauxhall Junior, finishing second overall in the championship, with five wins, and in 1993, he entered the British Formula Ford series, once again finishing runner-up whilst also finishing fourth in the Formula Ford Festival, driving for the works Swift Racing Cars team in both series.

For 1994, Smith moved to the British Formula Vauxhall Championship, finishing fourth overall, whilst also managing to finish sixth overall in the Formula Opel Lotus Nations Cup. 1995 proved to be a breakthrough year, with Smith winning the British Formula Renault Championship, finishing fourth overall in the Formula Renault Eurocup (both times driving for Manor Motorsport) and as prize he received a day of testing a Williams FW17 Formula 1 car at Silverstone. In 1996, he made the switch to the British Formula 3, driving for Fortec Motorsport and winning his first race in the series, eventually finishing sixth overall. He also entered that year's Macau Grand Prix, finishing tenth for the TOM's team, and entered the Masters of Formula 3 race, failing to finish.

Smith remained in the British Formula 3 Championship for 1997, but had a less successful year, finishing ninth overall, with an eighteenth place in the Masters of Formula 3, driving in both for DC Cook Motorsports. He also made his debut in the FIA GT Championship, driving for the Cirtek Motorsport team in their GT2-class Saleen Mustang at the Spa 4 Hours, finishing 25th overall and 13th in class. In 1998 he moved to America to contest the Indy Lights series, driving for Johansson Motorsports, where he finished third in the Championship and was crowned 'Rookie of the Year' after taking two victories. He remained in the series for 1999, moving to Forsythe Racing, finishing fifth in the championship and testing a Champ Car for the first time.

=== 2000–2002 ===
In 2000, Smith made the switch to the American Le Mans Series, entering ten events for Johansson-Matthews Racing in LMP1, finishing fifteenth in class. He also competed in the then-new Rolex Sports Car Series, entering the 24 Hours of Daytona finishing fourth in class, and made his 24 Hours of Le Mans debut, driving once more for Johansson-Matthews Racing. The team would fail to finish due to engine failure, with some consolation for Smith coming from being awarded the "Rookie of the Year" title.

For 2001, Smith moved to the new IMSA-run European Le Mans Series, once more racing for Johansson Racing, in an Audi R8. He competed in the first three races, finishing ninth overall in the championship. Smith also entered the FIA Sportscar Championship race at Monza for Redman Bright, qualifying on pole, but eventually finishing last of the four finishers, and took part in the 24 Hours of Le Mans once more, this time driving for the works Team Bentley. The race was not successful, with the car catching fire with Smith at the wheel, and being forced to retire.

Smith was less active in 2002, scoring a second place at that year's Daytona 24 Hours and finishing third at the Sebring 12 Hours, both with Jim Matthews Racing. He spent the majority of the year with Team Bentley as its official test driver, due to its decision to only enter one car at that year's 24 Hours of Le Mans race.

=== 2003–2005 ===
Smith was more active in 2003, competing for Bentley in the 12 Hours of Sebring, part of the American Le Mans Series, finishing fourth overall in Bentley's first North American race for over 70 years. This was followed by an overall win at the 24 Hours of Le Mans, with co-drivers Tom Kristensen and Rinaldo Capello, once more driving the Bentley Speed 8. Following his Le Mans 24 Hours victory, Smith entered the Spa 24 Hours, part of the FIA GT Championship, driving for Team Maranello Concessionaires in an N-GT class Ferrari 360 Modena. He also drove for the team in the Donington Park round of the championship. He also entered his first, and to date only, Race of Champions event. Towards the end of the year, Smith drove a Peugeot 206 XS rally car at a test session, held by ProSpeed Motorsport at the RallyDrive School in Lincolnshire.

In 2004, Smith once more only entered two prototype races, finishing third at the 12 Hours of Sebring, driving for Audi Sport UK Team Veloqx. He also finished second overall at Le Mans, driving once more for Audi, with Johnny Herbert and Jamie Davies as his co-drivers. However, that year Smith made his Champ Car World Series debut, during the second half of the season, driving for Paul Gentilozzi's Rocketsports team. His best finishes were a pair of ninth places, and he finished 18th overall.

For 2005, Smith competed in the first seven races of the Grand Am Rolex Series, finishing 36th in class, driving a Riley Mk XI Pontiac entered by Orbit Racing. His best result was an eighth placing at the 6 Hours of Watkins Glen race. He also competed in both the 12 Hours of Sebring, and the Petit Le Mans, driving a Dyson Racing Team-entered MG-Lola EX257, both races being part of the American Le Mans Series, with a second placing overall at the latter race being his best result. His other entry that year came as part of the Le Mans Endurance Series, where he finished second in the LMP2 class for Chamberlain Synergy Motor, driving a Lola B05/40 AER at the 1000km of Istanbul.

=== 2006–2008 ===
Smith opened up his 2006 season with a 14th place overall (10th in class) at the Daytona 24 Hours, driving for Howard - Boss Motorsports in its Crawford DP03 Pontiac. He competed in ten further races for the team that year, which ran under the HBM banner in the Rolex Sports Car Series (four races total in this series), and the Dyson Racing banner in ALMS races (seven races total). His best finish of the RSCS season was a seventh place at the Linder-Komatsu Grand Prix of Miami, whilst his best finish of the ALMS season was a second place at the Grand Prix of Mosport. Despite only competing in 70% of the races, Smith finished sixth overall in the ALMS that year.

Like in 2006, Smith started his 2007 season at the Daytona 24 Hours, driving for Howard Motorsports. However, it would not prove to be a successful race, with the team retiring after 295 laps. For the first time, he entered a full ALMS season, once more for Dyson Racing, who were now running the Porsche RS Spyder. His best overall finish was a third at the Petit Le Mans, with the second in the LMP2 class also being his best result of the season. He finished fourth in the class championship.

Smith remained with Dyson Racing for 2008, still running the Porsche RS Spyders. Although prior to the start of the season he had hoped to take the team's first win, the season would prove to be less successful, with one class podium at the 12 Hours of Sebring, only being enough for a sixth place championship finish. For the first time in four years, Smith returned to Le Mans, driving the Quifel ASM Team's Lola B05/40 AER, alongside Miguel Amaral and Olivier Pla. Although only finishing 20th overall, the trio did manage to finish fifth in class.

=== 2009–2011 ===
For 2009, Smith once more remained with Dyson Racing, who were now entering the new Lola B09/86 Mazda LMP2-class cars. He finished fourth overall, and drove a biofuel-powered version of the car in the last two races, which rendered him ineligible for points in those events. He made his first appearance in the Le Mans Series, and a LMP1-spec car, for several years at the 1000 km of Spa, driving the Team LNT-entered Ginetta-Zytek GZ09S, and finishing sixteenth overall, eleventh in class. Smith also returned to the 24 Hours of Le Mans, once more driving for the Quifel ASM Team alongside Miguel Amaral and Olivier Pia, but this time the team had entered the Ginetta-Zytek GZ09S/2 LMP2-class car. The race proved to be fruitless, with a fuel line failure, plus Amaral crashing out, forcing the team to retire the car.

Smith remained with Dyson Racing for the 2010 ALMS. He entered eight of the nine races, finishing sixth overall, and taking his, and the team's, first victory in ALMS at the Mid-Ohio Sports Car Challenge. It was announced on 15 February 2010 that Smith would be competing in the 2010 24 Hours of Le Mans with the Rebellion Racing Team driving a Lola B10/60 in the LMP1 class. Although targeting an overall victory, the team were forced to retire, after Jean-Christophe Boullion crashed the Lola B10/60-Rebellion out of eleventh place. He also drove for Rebellion in the 8 Hours of Castellet, part of the Le Mans Series, where he finished third overall and took part in the RAC Rally alongside Patrick Walsh in a Ford Escort Mk 1, but didn't finish.

For the seventh successive year, Smith remained with Dyson Racing in the American Le Mans Series, driving with Chris Dyson. The team took the title with one race to go, at the American Le Mans Monterey, where they finished second overall. They had also been involved in a very close race at the Road Race Showcase, held at the Road America track, losing by just 0.112 seconds to the Muscle Milk Racing of Klaus Graf and Lucas Luhr. He also entered the 24 Hours of Le Mans with Rebellion Racing, for the second time in a row, but the events of the previous year repeated themselves, with Boullion crashing out of the race, forcing the team to retire the car, raced in the Nurburgring 24 Hours with RJN Motorsport, and returned to the RAC Rally.

=== 2012–2013 ===
For 2012, Smith continued with Dyson Racing, now driving a new Lola B12/60 Mazda to defend his ALMS title, but came up nine points short, finishing in second place. Smith was involved in the series' closest ever finish, at the Road Race Showcase, winning by just 0.083 seconds from Muscle Milk Racing. Although initially signed up to drive for Dyson in its first ever 24 Hours of Le Mans race, the team withdrew from the event due to financial reasons, and Smith did not compete. Smith did, however, make an appearance at the Goodwood Festival of Speed, driving several Bentleys, including the new Continental GT Speed. He had also driven one of the parade Continental GT Speeds at the 24 Hours of Nürburgring, and made his third straight appearance in the RAC Rally.

For the ninth successive season, Smith remained with Dyson Racing for the 2013 American Le Mans Series. Electrical and mechanical gremlins forced him out of the 12 Hours of Sebring, after just 81 laps. He also raced in the 24H Dubai with Ram Racing in a Ferrari 458 GT3.

=== 2014–2018 ===
A factory driver for Bentley, in 2014, Smith competed in the Blancpain GT Series Endurance Cup as part of Bentley Team M-Sport alongside Steven Kane and Andy Meyrick, finishing second in the championship and taking victory on home soil at Silverstone. In 2015, the trio returned to the series, once again coming second in the championship standings, while he also raced in the Bathurst 12 Hours, crossing the line in fourth position.

In 2016, Smith remained with Bentley in the Blancpain GT Series, finished third at the Bathurst 12 Hours, and seventh at the Nurburgring 24 Hours, while in 2017 he added a third place at the Bathurst 12 Hours, before retiring as a factory driver in 2018. That year he entered a number of single stage rallies, taking wins at the Cadwell Park Stages and Dukeries Rally.

=== 2019–2022 ===
For the 2019–20 season, Smith returned to the FIA World Endurance Championship with Team LNT in a Ginetta G60-LT-P1, completing the first four rounds of the series. In 2021 he joined United Autosports in the IMSA Sportscar Championship, finishing third in LMP2 at the 6 Hours of Watkins Glen, and fourth at Petit Le Mans, and raced in the Road to Le Mans contests in LMP3.

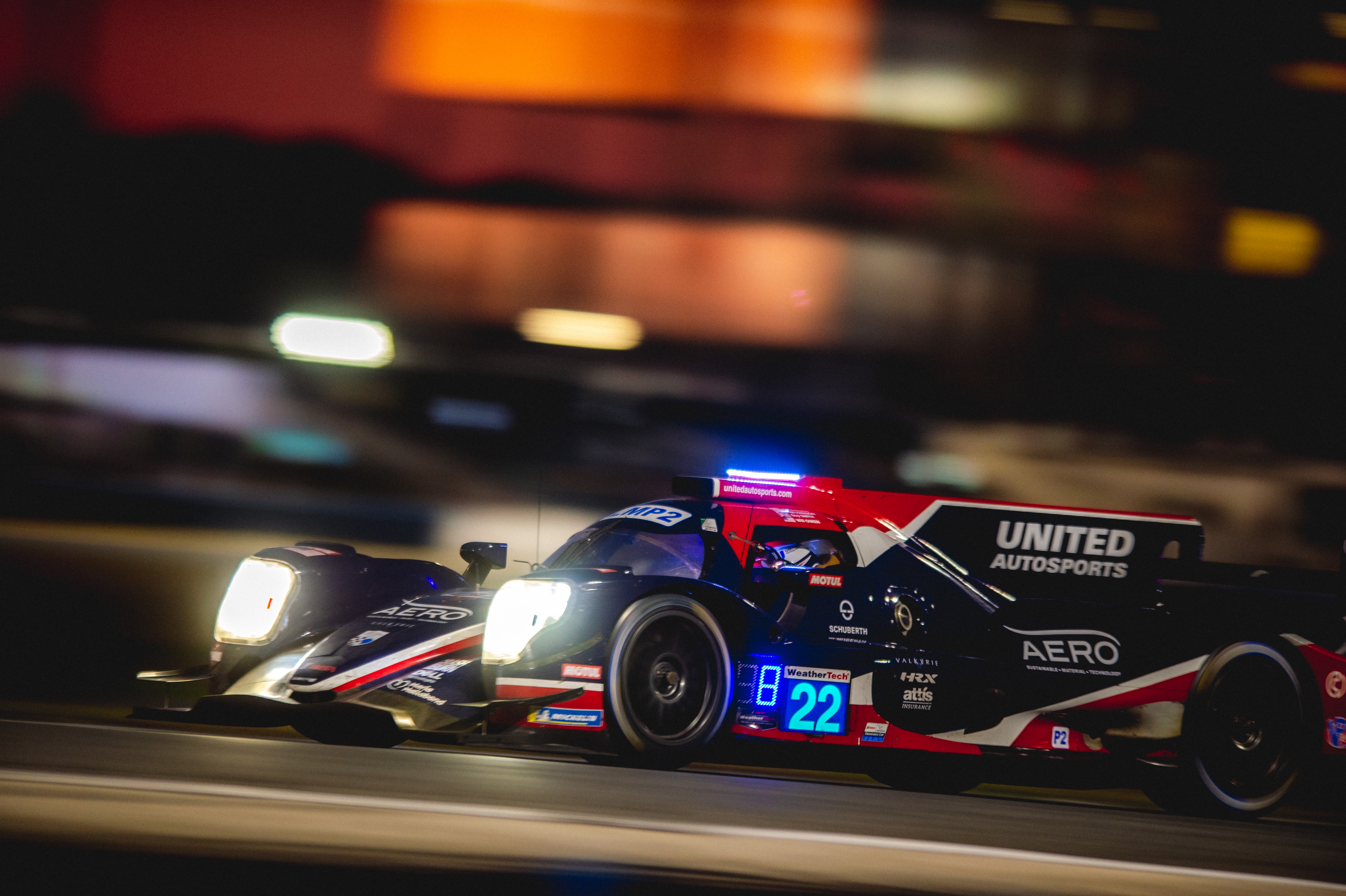
Smith competing in the 2022 24 Hours of Daytona.

Smith founded Greenlight Sports Management with Andy Meyrick in 2020, working with racing drivers to identify and manage the best opportunities and prepare development programmes to further their careers.

In 2022, Smith remained with United Autosports in LMP2, racing at the 24 Hours of Daytona, where he finished sixth, and the 12 Hours of Sebring, finishing fifth, and claimed victory in the Donington Park Rally alongside Patrick Walsh in a Ford Fiesta R5. The same year, he was interviewed about his work for Greenlight Sports by the mental health awareness platform, Wobbling About And Rocking Out.

== Motorsports career results ==
=== Complete American open–wheel racing results ===
(key) (Races in bold indicate pole position; races in italics indicate fastest lap)

==== Indy Lights ====
| Year | Team | 1 | 2 | 3 | 4 | 5 | 6 | 7 | 8 | 9 | 10 | 11 | 12 | 13 | 14 | Rank | Points |
|---|---|---|---|---|---|---|---|---|---|---|---|---|---|---|---|---|---|
| 1998 | Johansson Motorsports | MIA; 3 | LBH; 8 | NAZ; 21 | GAT; 11 | MIL; 22 | DET; 8 | **POR**; 1 | CLE; 4 | **TOR**; 1 | MCH; 6 | TRO; 4 | VAN; 8 | LAG; 15 | FON; 10 | 3rd | 110 |
| 1999 | Forsythe Championship Racing | MIA; 11 | LBH; 18 | NAZ; 10 | MIL; 8 | POR; 3 | CLE; 11 | TOR; 6 | MCH; 6 | DET; 13 | CHI; 2 | **LAG**; 4 | FON; 19 | | | 9th | 71 |

==== Champ Car World Series ====
(key)

| Year | Team | No. | Chassis | Engine | 1 | 2 | 3 | 4 | 5 | 6 | 7 | 8 | 9 | 10 | 11 | 12 | 13 | 14 | Rank | Pts | Ref |
|---|---|---|---|---|---|---|---|---|---|---|---|---|---|---|---|---|---|---|---|---|---|
| 2004 | Rocketsports | 17 | Lola B02/00 | Ford XFE V8 t | LBH | MTY | MIL | POR | CLE | TOR | VAN | ROA; 10 | DEN; 18 | MTL; 16 | LAG; 9 | LVS; 17 | SRF; 9 | MXC; 17 | 18th | 53 | |

=== Complete American Le Mans Series results ===
(key) (Races in bold indicate pole position; results in italics indicate fastest lap)

| Year | Entrant | Class | Chassis | Engine | 1 | 2 | 3 | 4 | 5 | 6 | 7 | 8 | 9 | 10 | 11 | 12 | Rank | Points | Ref |
|---|---|---|---|---|---|---|---|---|---|---|---|---|---|---|---|---|---|---|---|
| 2000 | Johansson-Matthews Racing | LMP | Reynard 2KQ | Judd GV4 4.0 L V10 | SEB; Ret | CHA | SIL; Ret | NÜR; 12 | SON; 7 | MOS; 4† | TEX; 7 | ROS; 5 | PET; Ret | MON; 5 | LSV; 5 | ADE | | | |
| 2001 | Johansson Motorsport Arena Motorsport | LMP900 | Audi R8 | Audi 3.6L Turbo V8 | TEX | SEB; 4 | DON; 3 | JAR; 3 | SON | POR | MOS | MID | MON | PET | | | | | |
| 2002 | Riley & Scott Racing Jim Matthews Racing | LMP900 | Riley & Scott Mk III C | Élan 6L8 6.0 L V8 | SEB; 3 | SON | MID | AME | WAS | TRO | MOS | MON | MIA | PET | | | | | |
| 2003 | Team Bentley | LMGTP | Bentley Speed 8 | Bentley 4.0 L Turbo V8 | SEB; 2 | ATL | SON | TRO | MOS | AME | MON | MIA | PET | | | | | | |
| 2004 | Audi Sport UK Team Veloqx | LMP1 | Audi R8 | Audi 3.6 L Turbo V8 | SEB; 3 | MID | LIM | SON | POR | MOS | AME | PET | MON | | | | | | |
| 2005 | Dyson Racing | LMP1 | MG-Lola EX257 | MG (AER) XP20 2.0 L Turbo I4 | SEB; 4† | ATL | MID | LIM | SON | POR | AME | MOS | PET; 2 | MON | | | | | |
| 2006 | Dyson Racing | LMP1 | Lola B06/10 | AER P32T 3.6L Turbo V8 | SEB; Ret | TEX; 3 | MID; Ret | LIM; Ret | UTA; 4 | POR; 3 | AME; 5 | MOS; 2 | PET; Ret | MON | | | 7th | 60 | |
| 2007 | Dyson Racing | LMP2 | Porsche RS Spyder Evo | Porsche MR6 3.4 L V8 | SEB; 6 | STP; 6† | LNB; 5 | TEX; 5 | UTA; 4 | LIM; 4 | MID; 5 | AME; 4 | MOS; 5 | DET; 5 | PET; 2 | MON; 5 | 7th | 124 | |
| 2008 | Dyson Racing | LMP2 | Porsche RS Spyder Evo | Porsche MR6 3.4 L V8 | SEB; 3 | STP; 4 | LNB; 7 | UTA; 6 | LIM; Ret | MID; 5 | AME; 6 | MOS; 7 | DET; 6 | PET; 6 | MON; 5 | | 9th | 101 | |
| 2009 | Dyson Racing Team | LMP2 | Lola B09/86 | Mazda MZR-R 2.0 L Turbo I4 | SEB; Ret | STP; 2 | LBH; 2 | UTA; 3 | LRP; Ret | MDO; Ret | ELK; 4† | MOS; Ret | | | | | 6th | 55 | |
| 2009 | Dyson Racing Team | UNC | Lola B09/86 | Mazda MZR-R 2.0 L Turbo I4 | | | | | | | | | PET; 1 | LAG; 1 | | | NC | - | |
| 2010 | Dyson Racing Team | LMP2 | Lola B09/86 | Mazda MZR-R 2.0 L Turbo I4 | SEB; 3 | | | | | | | | PET; Ret | | | | 6th | 92 | |
| 2010 | Dyson Racing Team | LMP | Lola B09/86 | Mazda MZR-R 2.0 L Turbo I4 | | LNB; 4 | MON; 3 | UTA; 6† | LIM; Ret | MID; 1 | AME; 4 | MOS; 5 | | | | | 6th | 92 | |
| 2011 | Dyson Racing Team | LMP1 | Lola B09/86 | Mazda MZR-R 2.0 L Turbo I4 | SEB; 6 | LNB; 2 | LIM; 1 | MOS; 2 | MID; 2 | AME; 2 | BAL; 2 | MON; 2 | PET; 8† | | | | 1st | 186 | |
| 2012 | Dyson Racing Team | P1 | Lola B12/60 | Mazda MZR-R 2.0 L Turbo I4 (Isobutanol) | SEB; 4 | LBH; 2 | LAG; 2 | LRP; 2 | MOS; 2 | MDO; 2 | ELK; 1 | BAL; 2 | VIR; 2 | PET; 2 | | | 2nd | 186 | |
| 2013 | Dyson Racing Team | P1 | Lola B12/60 | Mazda MZR-R 2.0 L Turbo I4 (Isobutanol) | SEB; Ret | LBH; Ret | LAG; Ret | LRP; 2 | MOS | ELK | BAL; 2 | COA | VIR; 2 | PET | | | 6th | 48 | |

^{†} Did not finish the race but was classified as his car completed more than 70% of the overall winner's race distance.

=== Complete 24 Hours of Le Mans results ===
| Year | Team | Co-Drivers | Car | Class | Laps | Pos. | Class Pos. |
|---|---|---|---|---|---|---|---|
| 2000 | (United States) Johansson-Matthews Racing | (Sweden) Stefan Johansson (United States) Jim Matthews | Reynard 2KQ-LM-Judd | LMP900 | 133 | DNF | DNF |
| 2001 | (United Kingdom) Team Bentley | (United Kingdom) Martin Brundle (Monaco) Stéphane Ortelli | Bentley EXP Speed 8 | LMGTP | 56 | DNF | DNF |
| 2003 | (United Kingdom) Team Bentley | (Denmark) Tom Kristensen (Italy) Rinaldo Capello | Bentley Speed 8 | LMGTP | 377 | **1st** | **1st** |
| 2004 | (United Kingdom) Audi Sport UK Team Veloqx | (United Kingdom) Johnny Herbert (United Kingdom) Jamie Davies | Audi R8 | LMP1 | 379 | **2nd** | **2nd** |
| 2008 | (Portugal) Quifel ASM Team | (Portugal) Miguel Amaral (France) Olivier Pla | Lola B05/40-AER | LMP2 | 325 | 20th | 4th |
| 2009 | (Portugal) Quifel ASM Team | (Portugal) Miguel Amaral (France) Olivier Pla | Ginetta-Zytek GZ09S/2 | LMP2 | 46 | DNF | DNF |
| 2010 | (Switzerland) Rebellion Racing | (Italy) Andrea Belicchi (France) Jean-Christophe Boullion | Lola B10/60-Judd | LMP1 | 143 | DNF | DNF |
| 2011 | (Switzerland) Rebellion Racing | (Italy) Andrea Belicchi (France) Jean-Christophe Boullion | Lola B10/60-Toyota | LMP1 | 190 | DNF | DNF |

=== Complete WeatherTech SportsCar Championship results ===
(key) (Races in bold indicate pole position; results in italics indicate fastest lap)

| Year | Team | Class | Make | Engine | 1 | 2 | 3 | 4 | 5 | 6 | 7 | Pos. | Points | Ref |
|---|---|---|---|---|---|---|---|---|---|---|---|---|---|---|
| 2021 | United Autosports | LMP2 | Oreca 07 | Gibson GK428 V8 | DAY | SEB; 5 | WGL; 3 | WGL | ELK | LGA | PET; 4 | 8th | 920 | |
| 2022 | United Autosports | LMP2 | Oreca 07 | Gibson GK428 V8 | DAY; 6† | SEB; 5 | LGA | MDO | WGL | ELK | PET | 20th | 284 | |

^{†} Points only counted towards the Michelin Endurance Cup, and not the overall LMP2 Championship.

=== Complete FIA World Endurance Championship results ===
(key) (Races in bold indicate pole position; results in italics indicate fastest lap)

| Year | Entrant | Class | Chassis | Engine | 1 | 2 | 3 | 4 | 5 | 6 | 7 | 8 | Rank | Points |
|---|---|---|---|---|---|---|---|---|---|---|---|---|---|---|
| 2019–20 | Team LNT | LMP1 | Ginetta G60-LT-P1 | AER P60C 2.4 L Turbo V6 | SIL; 12 | FUJ; 9 | SHA; 5 | BHR; Ret | COA | SPA | LMS | BHR | 19th | 12.5 |

Awards
| Preceded by James Matthews | Autosport; British Club Driver of the Year; 1995 | Succeeded by Peter Dumbreck |
Sporting positions
| Preceded by James Matthews | British Formula Renault; UK series champion 1995 | Succeeded by David Cook |
| Preceded by Frank Biela; Tom Kristensen; Emanuele Pirro | Winner of the 24 Hours of Le Mans; 2003 with: Tom Kristensen; Rinaldo Capello | Succeeded by Seiji Ara; Tom Kristensen; Rinaldo Capello |
| Preceded by David Brabham; Simon Pagenaud | American Le Mans Series champion 2011 with Chris Dyson | Succeeded by Klaus Graf; Lucas Luhr |
