= Xavier Pompidou =

French racing driver (born 1972)

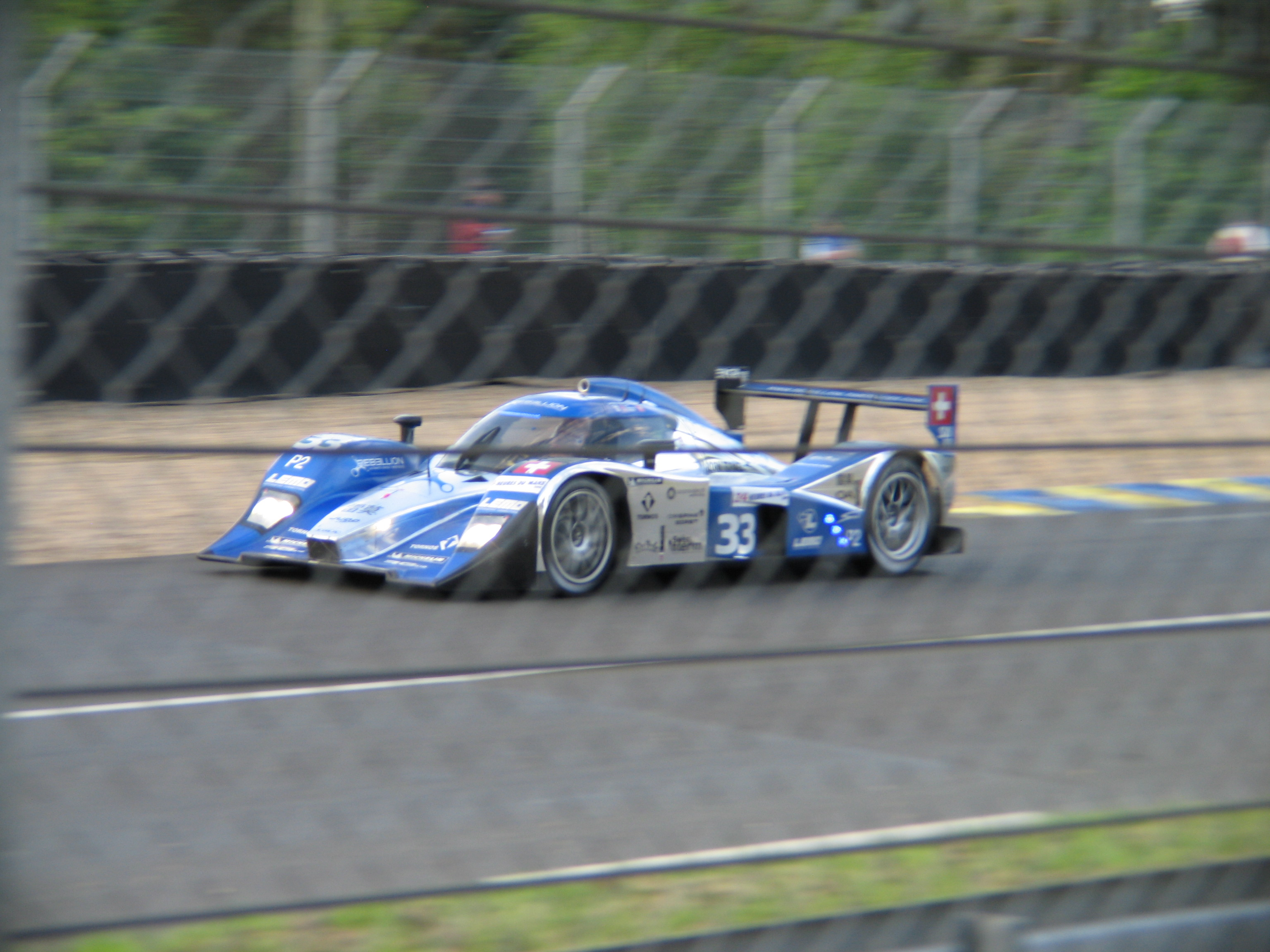
- Pompidou in 2009
- Nationality: (France) French
- Born: 27 July 1972 (age 54) Meulan-en-Yvelines, France
- Categorisation: FIA Platinum (until 2012); FIA Gold (2013–2014); FIA Silver (2015–)

Xavier Pompidou (born 27 July 1972) is a French racing driver.

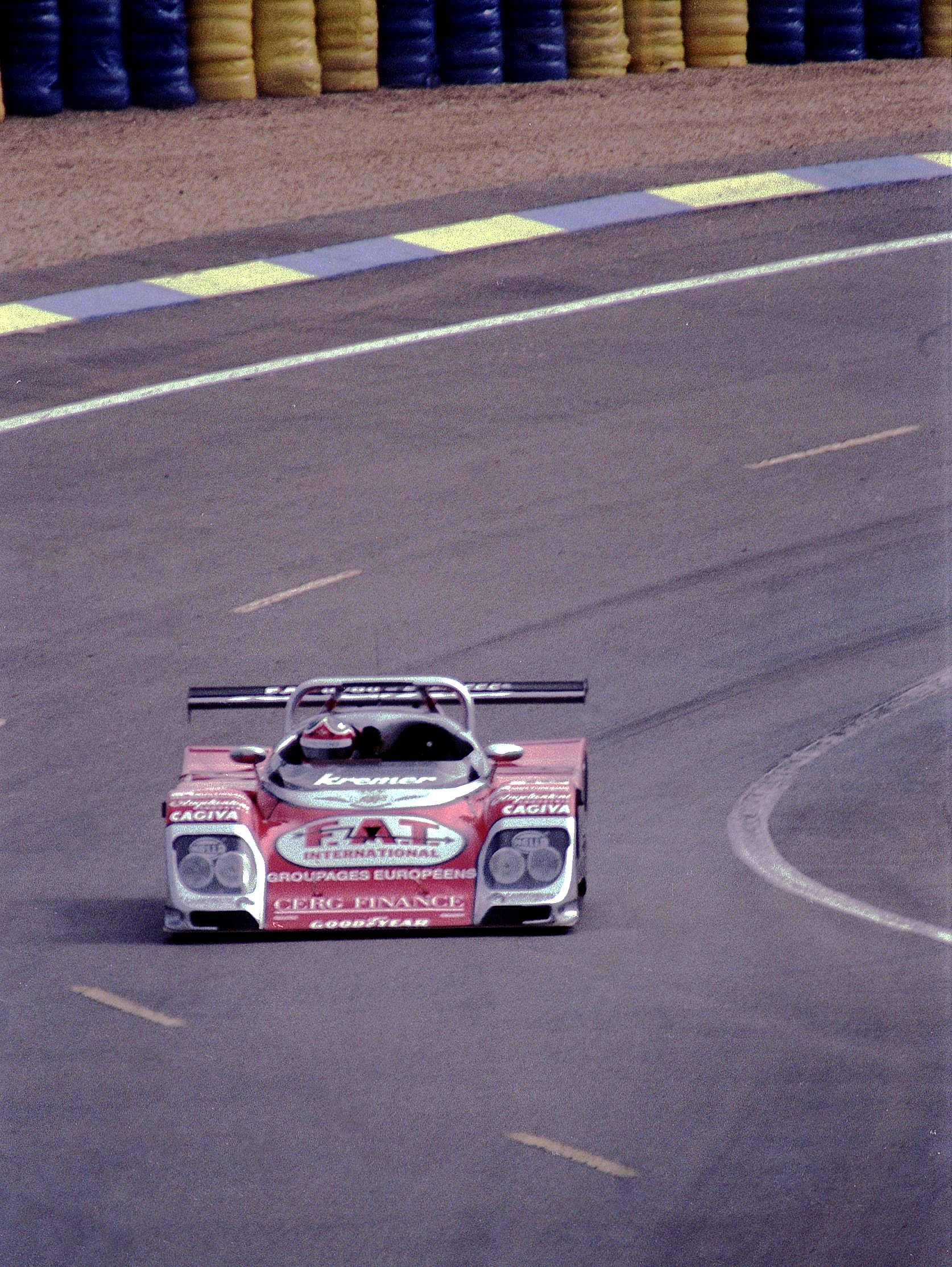
Pompidou raced for Kremer in LMP1 on his Le Mans debut.

In 2009, Pompidou drove for Speedy Racing Team Sebah in the European Le Mans Series. The team entered the 24 hours of Le Mans and finished second in class and 12th overall.

== Racing record ==
=== 24 Hours of Le Mans results ===
Year	Team	Co-Drivers	Car	Class	Laps	Pos.	Class Pos.
1998	(Germany) Kremer Racing	(Italy) Rocky Agusta (Italy) Almo Coppelli	Kremer K8/2 Spyder-Porsche	LMP1	314	12th	2nd
2000	(France) Gerard Welter	(France) Jean-Bernard Bouvet (Italy) Stéphane Daoudi	WR LMP-Peugeot	LMP675	169	DNF	DNF
2001	(United Kingdom) Team Ascari	(Canada) Scott Maxwell (Netherlands) Klaas Zwart	Ascari A410-Judd	LMP900	66	DNF	DNF
2005	(Japan) T2M Motorsport	(France) Jean-Luc Blanchemain (Japan) Yutaka Yamagishi	Porsche 911 GT3-RS	GT2	183	DNF	DNF
2006	(United Kingdom) Sebah Automotive Ltd.	(Germany) Christian Ried (Denmark) Thorkild Thyrring	Porsche 911 GT3-RSR	GT2	256	DNF	DNF
2008	(Switzerland) Speedy Racing Team (United Kingdom) Sebah Automotive	(Italy) Andrea Belicchi (Switzerland) Steve Zacchia	Lola B08/80-Judd	LMP2	194	DNF	DNF
2009	(Switzerland) Speedy Racing Team (United Kingdom) Sebah Automotive	(United Kingdom) Jonny Kane (Switzerland) Benjamin Leuenberger	Lola B08/80-Judd	LMP2	343	12th	2nd
