= Steve Zacchia =

Swiss racing driver (born 1982)

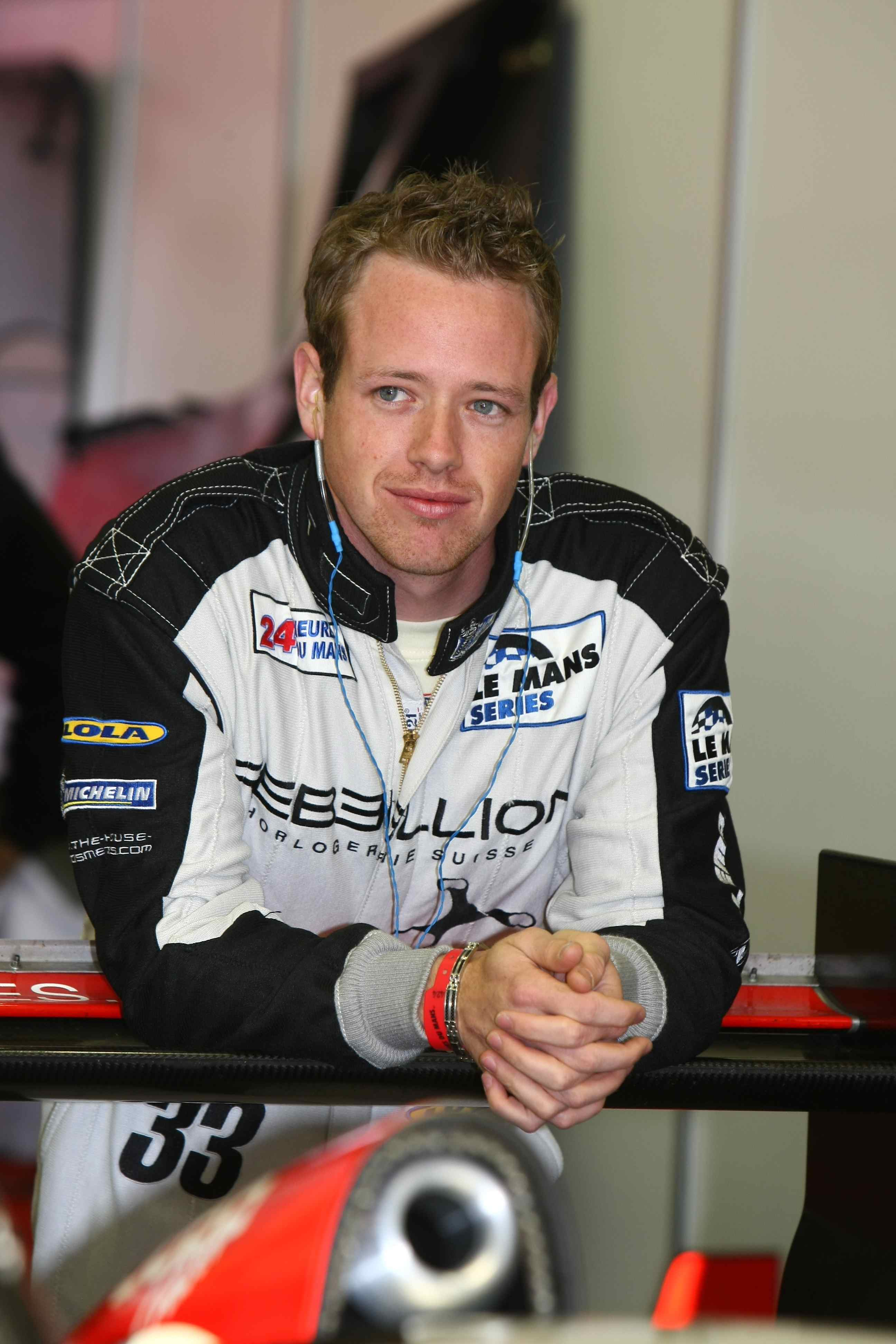
- Nationality: (Switzerland) Swiss
- Born: 15 August 1982 (age 44) Yverdon-les-Bains, Switzerland

Intercontinental Le Mans Cup career
- Debut season: 2011
- Current team: Hope Racing
- Categorisation: FIA Gold (until 2019); FIA Silver (2020–)
- Best finish: 7th in 2011

24 Hours of Le Mans career
- Years: 2003, 2008
- Teams: Larbre Compétition, Speedy Racing Team Sebah
- Best finish: 16th (2003)
- Class wins: 0

Previous series
- 2001 2002, 06 2003, 05-07 2004, 08-10 2006 2007 2008 2009: Formula Renault 2.0 Eurocup; Porsche Carrera Cup France; FIA GT Championship; Le Mans Series; FIA GT3 European Championship; French GT Championship; Belgian GT Championship; International GT Open

Championship titles
- 2004: Le Mans Series (GTS)

Steve Zacchia (born 15 August 1982 in Yverdon-les-Bains) is a Swiss racing driver, currently competing in the Intercontinental Le Mans Cup for Hope Racing.

== Early career ==
Zacchia began go-karting in 1998 when he finished fourth in the Swiss Regional Championship in Category B. He raced in Category A in 1999 finishing third in the standings. In 2000, he started competing in European Championships and getting into the finals of the Winfield World Challenge. His single-seater career only lasted a year, when he began competing in the 2001 Formula Renault 2000 Eurocup season. He competed in every race weekend but did not score a point. In 2002, he started competing in sports car racing by racing in Porsche Carrera Cup France. He picked up one win and three podiums.

== GT Racing ==
2003 saw Zacchia compete in the FIA GT Championship. The 2003 season saw Zacchia team up with ex-Formula One driver Philippe Alliot and French singer David Hallyday for Force One Racing Festina. He raced five of the ten races, picking up 14 points, including a podium at Donington. After racing in Le Mans Series in 2004, he returned to FIA GT in 2005 with Larbre Compétition He teamed up with Swiss compatriots Lilian Bryner and Enzo Calderari He earned 16 points during the season. In 2006, he competed in the newly formed FIA GT3 European Championship. He raced in all events during the season, racing for French team Racing Logistic alongside Olivier Dupard. Zacchia and Dupard earned 14 points finishing 20th in the drivers standings. He participated in one round of the 2006 FIA GT Championship season at the 2006 FIA GT Dubai 500km. He raced for Larbre Compétition and their evolution of Prodrive's Ferrari 550-GTS Maranello in the G2 class as it was an unhomologated GT1 car. He finished seventh along with Gabriele Gardel and Frédéric Makowiecki. He returned to the Porsche Carrera Cup France for two events for Larbre, picking up three points. 2007 saw Zacchia race in the French GT Championship for Solution F earning 18 points with co-driver Jean-Yves Adam. He raced in the 2007 FIA GT Championship season for one event in the French circuit of Nogaro. François Jakubowski was his team mate for the Solution F Ferrari 550 finishing 20th overall. Zacchia was more focused on Le Mans Series afterwards but did compete in a round of the Belgian GT Championship in 2008 and two rounds of the International GT Open in 2009.

== Le Mans Series/24 Hours of Le Mans ==
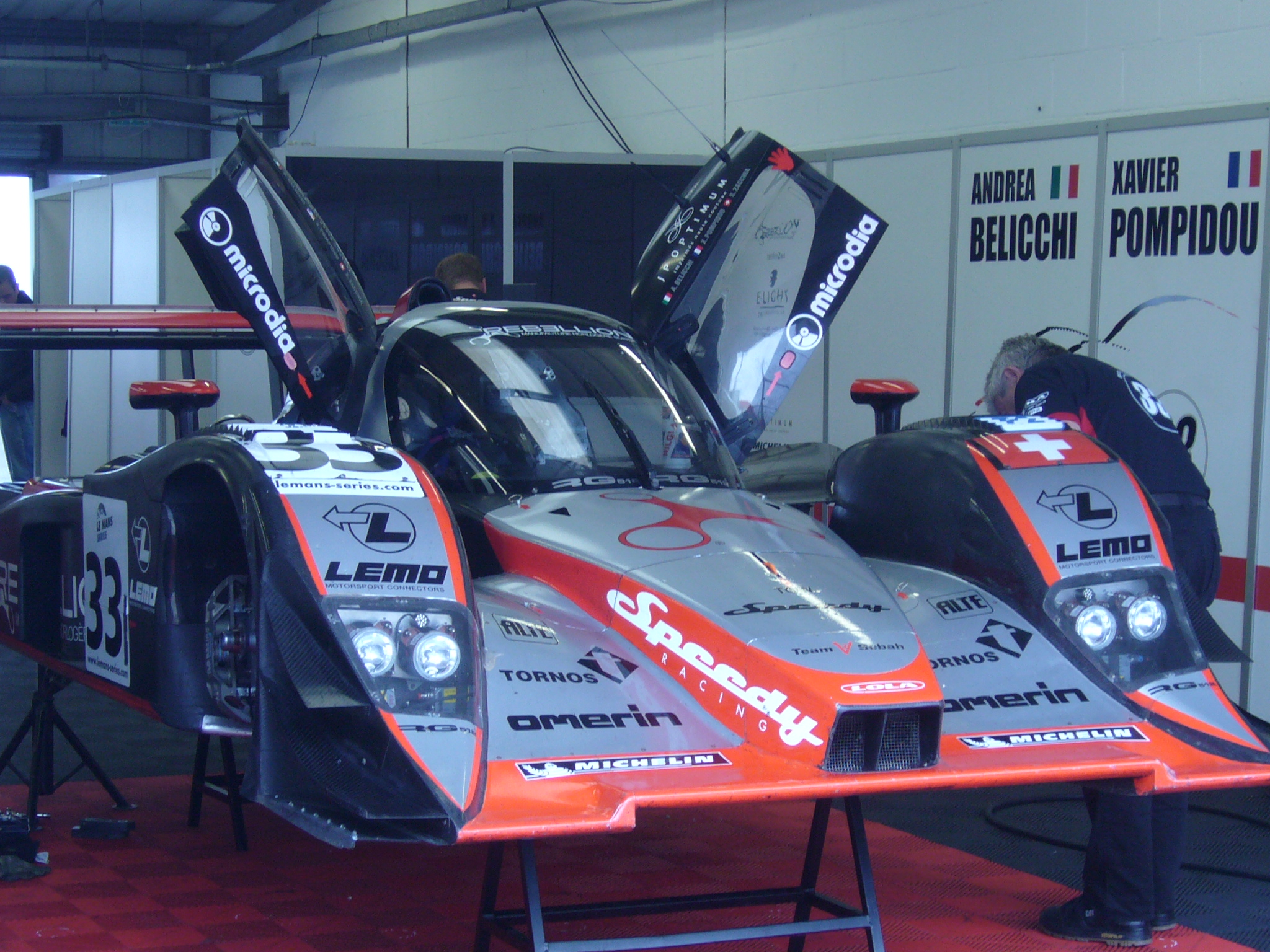
Zacchia's Lola B08/80-Judd in the pits at the 2008 1000 km of Silverstone.

Zacchia got his first taste of endurance racing at the 2003 24 Hours of Le Mans. He raced for Larbre Compétition in the GTS class using a Chrysler Viper GTS-R. His team mates were Patrice Goueslard and 1993 24 Hours of Le Mans winner Christophe Bouchut. They finished 16th overall and fourth in class. Larbre signed Zacchia prior to the 2004 Le Mans Series season. He reunited with 2003 Le Mans team mate Bouchut, his other team mate was ex-F1 driver Pedro Lamy. The trio won every race in the GTS class with their Ferrari 550-GTS Maranello, thus winning the championship. Zacchia focused on FIA GT for the next two seasons before returning to LMS in 2007, once again with Larbe with support from Aston Martin Racing as Larbre ran their DBR9. His team mate for the majority of the season was Gregor Fisken. For the final round, the 2007 Mil Milhas Brasil, the duo were joined by Roland Bervillé and Brazilian racer Fernando Rees. It was the final round at Interlagos that he won in the GT1 class but only half points were awarded due to less than five cars competing in that particular class. Zacchia and Fisken finished eighth in the GT1 standings, with their No. 51 car finishing sixth in the teams championship. In 2008, he was signed by Swiss team Speedy Racing Team Sebah (now Rebellion Racing) for the Le Mans Series season. Zacchia raced a Lola B08/80-Judd in the LMP2 class along with team mates Andrea Belicchi and Xavier Pompidou The trio picked up points in only the first event of the season, the 1000 km of Catalunya where they finished second in class Zacchia and co. finished tenth in the drivers championship and seventh in the teams. Zacchia returned to the 24 Hours of Le Mans in 2008 for Speedy, teaming up with LMS team mates Belicchi and Pompidou. Their LMP2-spec Lola-Judd retired after 194 laps.

2009 was a quiet year for Zacchia, racing only on a couple of occasions in the International GT Open but also raced one round of the 2009 Le Mans Series season, reuniting with Larbre Compétition in the 1000 km of Catalunya. Only four cars competed in the GT1 class in which Zacchia raced in with a Saleen S7-R. Zacchia along with Roland Bervillé and Sébastien Dumez finished third in class and 22nd overall. 2010 saw another year of Le Mans Series racing for Zacchia, this time for Swiss team Hope Polevision Racing. He competed a full season in the one-make Formula Le Mans (FLM) class along with Luca Moro and Wolfgang Kaufmann. The trio took their only class victory of the season at the 100 km of Spa. Zacchia and Moro finished runners-up in the drivers and teams championships. In 2011, Zacchia once again raced for Hope Racing in the Intercontinental Le Mans Cup driving an Oreca 01 Hybrid chassis. It would be powered by a two-litre four cylinder petrol engine from Volkswagen modified by Lehmann Motoren, badged as Swiss HyTech. It also featured KERS, an automotive system whereby the kinetic energy of a moving vehicle is recovered under braking and stored in the flywheel for later use under acceleration, developed by Flybrid. Zacchia competed with this car in the LMP1 class in the ILMC and at that year's 24 Hours of Le Mans alongside French driver Nicolas Marroc and Le Mans veteran and 1988 winner Jan Lammers.

== 24 Hours of Le Mans results ==
Year	Team	Co-Drivers	Car	Class	Laps	Pos.	Class Pos.
2003	(France) Larbre Compétition	(France) Patrice Goueslard (France) Christophe Bouchut	Chrysler Viper GTS-R	GTS	317	16th	4th
2008	(Switzerland) Speedy Racing Team (United Kingdom) Sebah Automotive	(Italy) Andrea Belicchi (France) Xavier Pompidou	Lola B08/80-Judd	LMP2	194	DNF	DNF
2011	(Switzerland) Hope Racing	(Netherlands) Jan Lammers (Denmark) Casper Elgaard	Oreca 01-Swiss HyTech	LMP1	115	DNF	DNF
