= Rebellion Racing =

Sports car endurance racing team in the World Endurance Championship

(Switzerland) Rebellion Racing
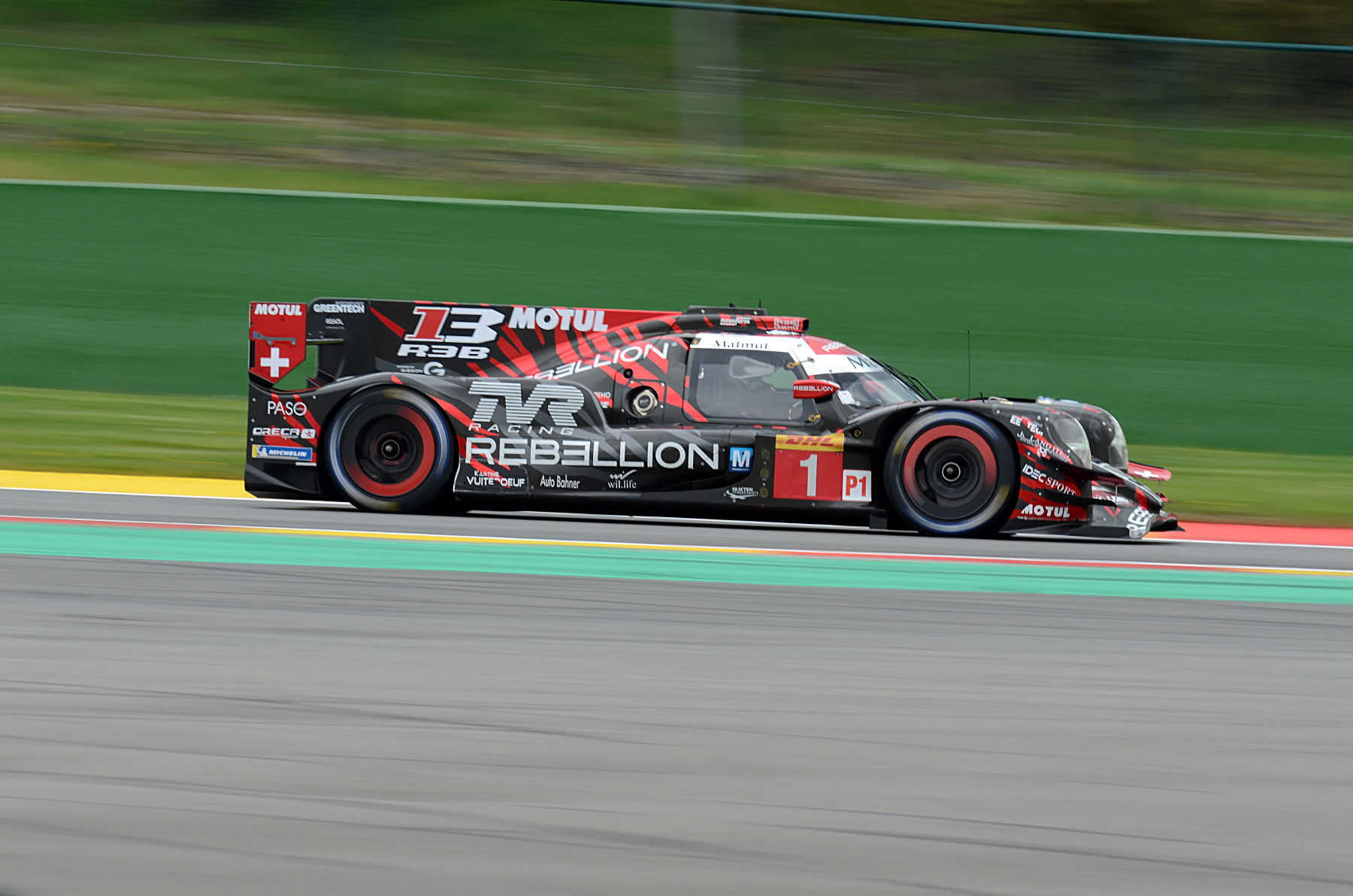
- Founded: 2010
- Folded: 2020
- Team principal(s): Alexandre Pesci
- Former series: FIA World Endurance Championship; European Le Mans Series; American Le Mans Series; WeatherTech SportsCar Championship; Intercontinental Le Mans Cup; Dakar Rally; Formula One
- Noted drivers: (Germany) André Lotterer (Switzerland) Neel Jani (Brazil) Bruno Senna (Switzerland) Mathias Beche (France) Thomas Laurent (United States) Gustavo Menezes (France) Nathanael Berthon (France) Norman Nato (Switzerland) Louis Delétraz (France) Romain Dumas (France) Nico Prost (United States) Marco Andretti (France) Jean-Christophe Boullion (Italy) Andrea Belicchi (United Kingdom) Guy Smith (Netherlands) Jeroen Bleekemolen (Switzerland) Harold Primat (China) Congfu Cheng (Switzerland) Fabio Leimer (Austria) Dominik Kraihamer (Switzerland) Alexandre Imperatori (Germany) Daniel Abt (Brazil) Nelson Piquet Jr. (Denmark) David Heinemeier Hansson (France) Julien Canal (France) Thomas Laurent (Switzerland) Steve Zacchia (France) Xavier Pompidou (Switzerland) Andrea Chiesa (Switzerland) Iradj Alexander (Switzerland) Benjamin Leuenberger (United Kingdom) Jonny Kane
- Teams' Championships: 7 (2011 LMS, (2012 FIA WEC, 2013 FIA WEC, 2014 FIA WEC, 2015 FIA WEC, 2016 FIA WEC FIA Endurance Trophy for Private LMP1 Teams), 2017 FIA WEC FIA Endurance Trophy for LMP2 Teams)
- Drivers' Championships: 4 (2014 FIA WEC, 2015 FIA WEC, 2016 FIA WEC FIA LMP1 Private Teams Drivers Trophy), 2017 FIA WEC FIA Endurance Trophy for LMP2 Drivers)

Rebellion Racing was a Swiss racing team that competed in endurance racing. The team competed in the 2011 Intercontinental Le Mans Cup season and won the LMP1 teams' title in the 2011 Le Mans Series season. The team started as an association between Speedy Racing and Sebah Racing, which began in 2008. Rebellion Racing's last team principal was Alexandre Pesci and the team manager was Bart Hayden.

From 2012 to 2016 the team participated in the FIA World Endurance Championship in the LMP1 category as a privateer, with two Lola B12/60 cars from 2012 to 2013, and two Rebellion R-One cars from 2014 to 2016. In 2017 the team moved to the LMP2 category with two Oreca 07 cars. Rebellion Racing would move back up to the LMP1 class in the 2018–19 FIA WEC & 2019–20 FIA WEC seasons with its R13 Gibson 4.5L V8 powered prototype until ending its operations after the 2020 24 Hours of Le Mans.

On 4 December 2019, it was announced that from the 2022-23 Season onwards, the team would be set to become the factory team of Peugeot Sport, and will run Le Mans Hypercars in the FIA World Endurance Championship as Rebellion Peugeot. However, on 13 February 2020, it was announced by the team's parent company, Rebellion Corporation, that following a strategic committee meeting, it was decided that the firm would cease its motorsport business operations after the 2020 24 Hours of Le Mans.

== Racing history ==
=== 2011–2013: Early years with Lola and WEC focus ===
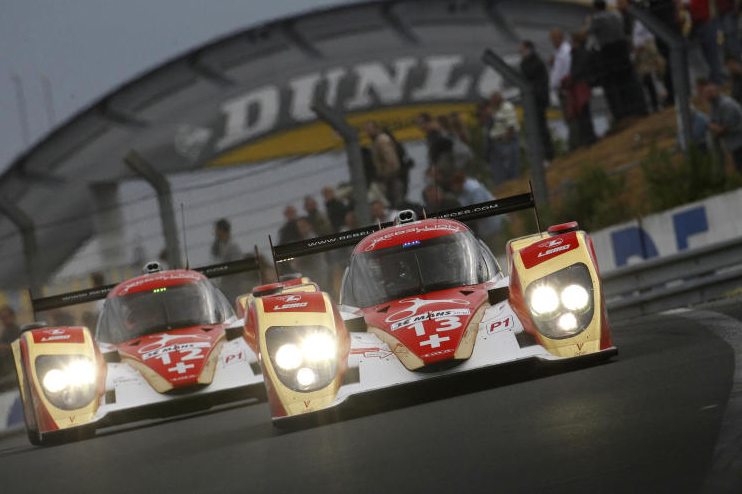
Rebellion Racing's Lola B10/60 cars during the 2011 24 Hours of Le Mans

In 2011, Rebellion Racing and Toyota Motorsport GmbH confirmed their plans for a Le Mans Prototype LMP1 engine supply partnership. Two Rebellion Racing Lola LMP1 cars powered by Toyota engines in LMP1. At the end of October 2010, Rebellion Racing and Toyota Motorsport engineers conducted an evaluation test programme at Portimao, Portugal and Monteblanco, Spain. The team have renewed the contracts of its regular 2010 drivers. Neel Jani / Nico Prost and Andrea Belicchi /Jean-Christophe Boullion spearheaded the Rebellion Racing attack.

At the 24 Hours of Le Mans, the No. 12 car of Nico Prost/Neel Jani/Jeroen Bleekemolen qualified 8th and finished 6th overall. It was the first gasoline finisher. The no. 13 car of Andrea Belicchi/Jean-Christophe Boullion and Guy Smith retired after 190 laps.

In the Le Mans Series, Rebellion won the LMP1 teams' title with 51 points, 1 point more than Pescarolo Team, which came courtesy of Neel Jani's pole position.

In the season finale of the Intercontinental Le Mans Cup in Zhuhai, the top gasoline-powered LMP1 car was the Rebellion team's Toyota-engined Lola coupe driven by Neel Jani and Nico Prost. It came back from an unscheduled stop to change front and rear bodywork, after Jani ran into the back of Allan McNish's Audi R18, to overhaul the OAK Racing OAK-Pescarolo driven by Alexandre Premat, Olivier Pla and Jacques Nicolet for fourth position and scored the points needed to secure third place in the Team classification in LM P1 of the Intercontinental Le Mans Cup, behind the turbo diesels of the Peugeot and Audi factory teams.

==== 2012–2013 ====
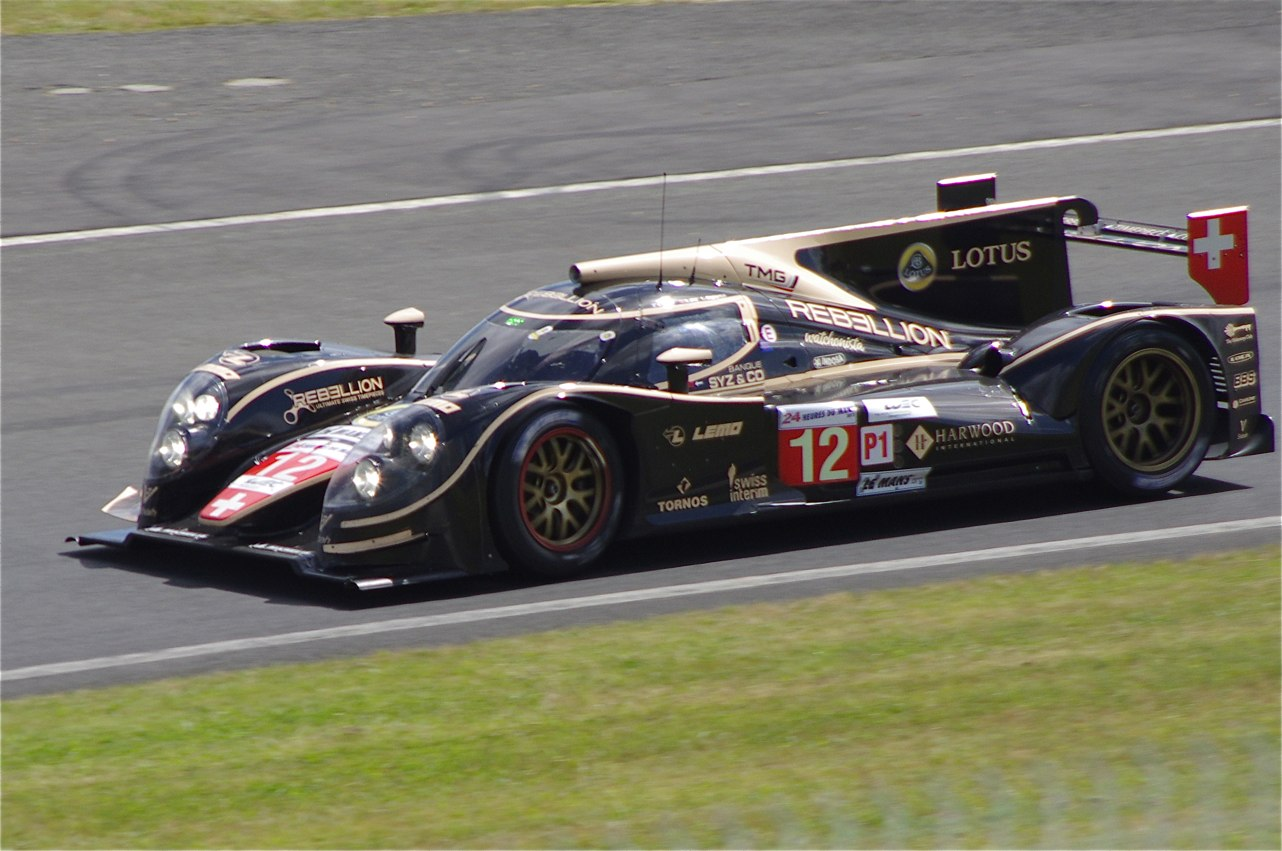
Rebellion's No. 13 Lola B12/60 during the 2012 24 Hours of Le Mans

On 1 February 2012, it was announced that German driver Nick Heidfeld would drive a Rebellion Lola-Toyota in select rounds of the FIA World Endurance Championship. Heidfeld will share the wheel of the Anglo-Swiss squad's No. 12 LMP1 entry with Neel Jani and Nico Prost at the Twelve Hours of Sebring, Six Hours of Spa and 24 Hours of Le Mans. He completes Rebellion's lineup, with Jeroen Bleekemolen having been announced on 31 January as the third driver in the No. 13 Lola-Toyota with Andrea Belicchi and Harold Primat.

Rebellion Racing entered the 2012 Petit Le Mans to attempt to score an overall victory at the race since Audi chose to not enter the race. After early battling with Muscle Milk Pickett Racing, the latter crashed when attempting to pass a GT car, allowing Rebellion to lead the rest of the race and win Petit Le Mans.

The team contested both the 2013 FIA World Endurance Championship and 2013 American Le Mans Series. But in July, midway through the season, the team decided to end its ALMS programme and focus on the WEC. After that, it only contested the Petit Le Mans series finale at Road Atlanta in October. Rebellion Racing took their second consecutive overall victory at Petit Le Mans, after Muscle Milk Pickett Racing again retired halfway through the race.

=== 2014–2016: Class victories with the R-One ===
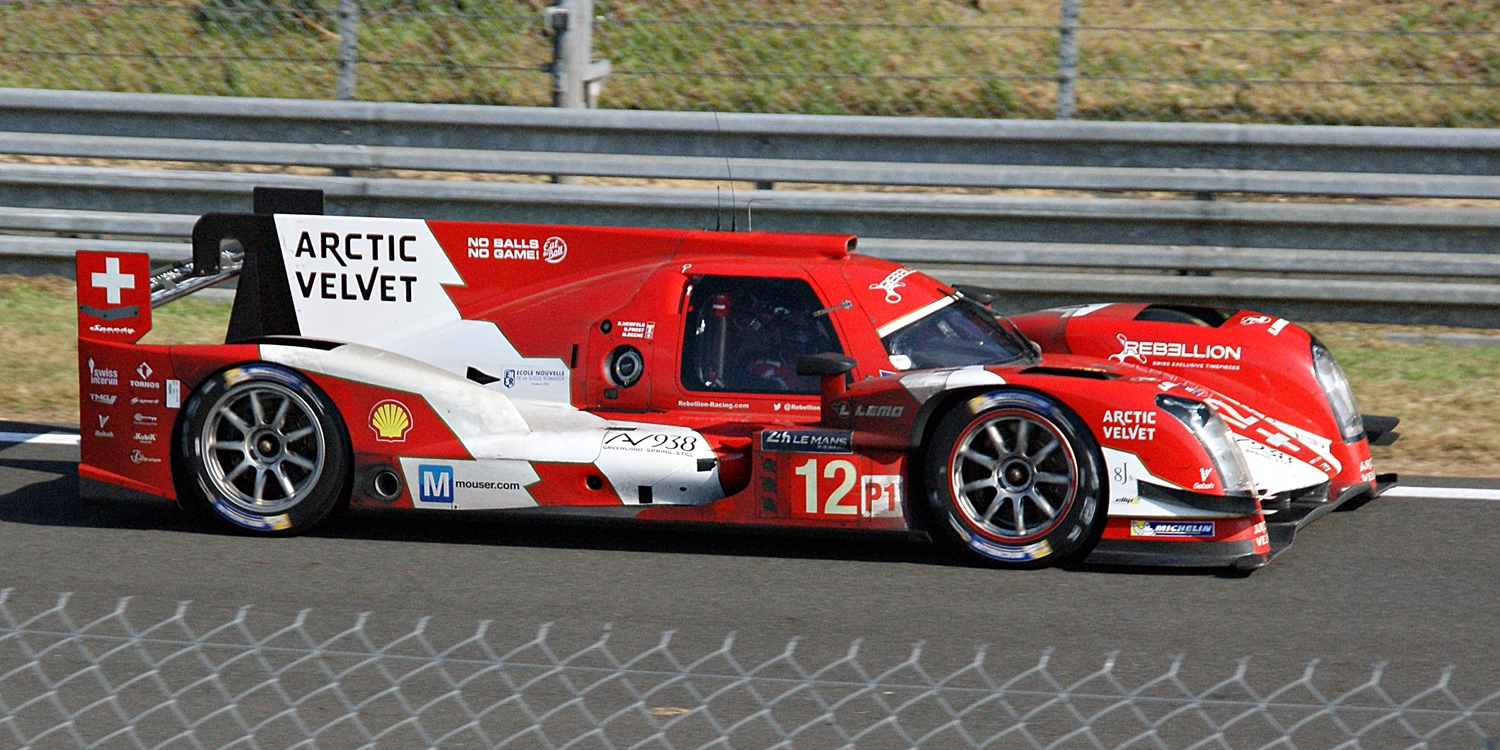
Rebellion took the LMP1-L class victory with Rebellion R-One during the 2014 24 Hours of Le Mans

On 8 June 2013, Rebellion confirmed they have entered a partnership with Oreca to design and build their own LMP1 car, the Rebellion R-One. The car debuted at the 6 Hours of Spa-Francorchamps in the 2014 FIA World Endurance Championship and continues to use Toyota engines.

On 3 February 2015, Rebellion Racing announced a new engine partnership for the 2015 FIA World Endurance Championship season. The Rebellion R-One LMP-1 cars will be powered by twin-turbo engines from Advanced Engine Research. Rebellion Racing will use AER P60 V6 GDI twin-turbocharged power units.

On 25 March 2015, it was announced that Alexandre Imperatori and Daniel Abt had signed up with the team to pilot the squad's second car alongside Dominik Kraihamer.

In 2016, The R-One LMP1 cars continued to be powered by AER P60 V6 GDI twin-turbo engines from Advanced Engine Research while also using Dunlop Tyres after previously using Michelin tyres. Their driver line-up would be Nick Heidfeld, Nico Prost and Nelson Piquet Jr. with Mathias Beche in round 4 in the No. 12 entry car. The No. 13 entry car's drivers were Dominik Kraihamer, Alexandre Imperatori and Mathéo Tuscher.

=== 2017–2020: Later years with R13, overall wins, and closure ===
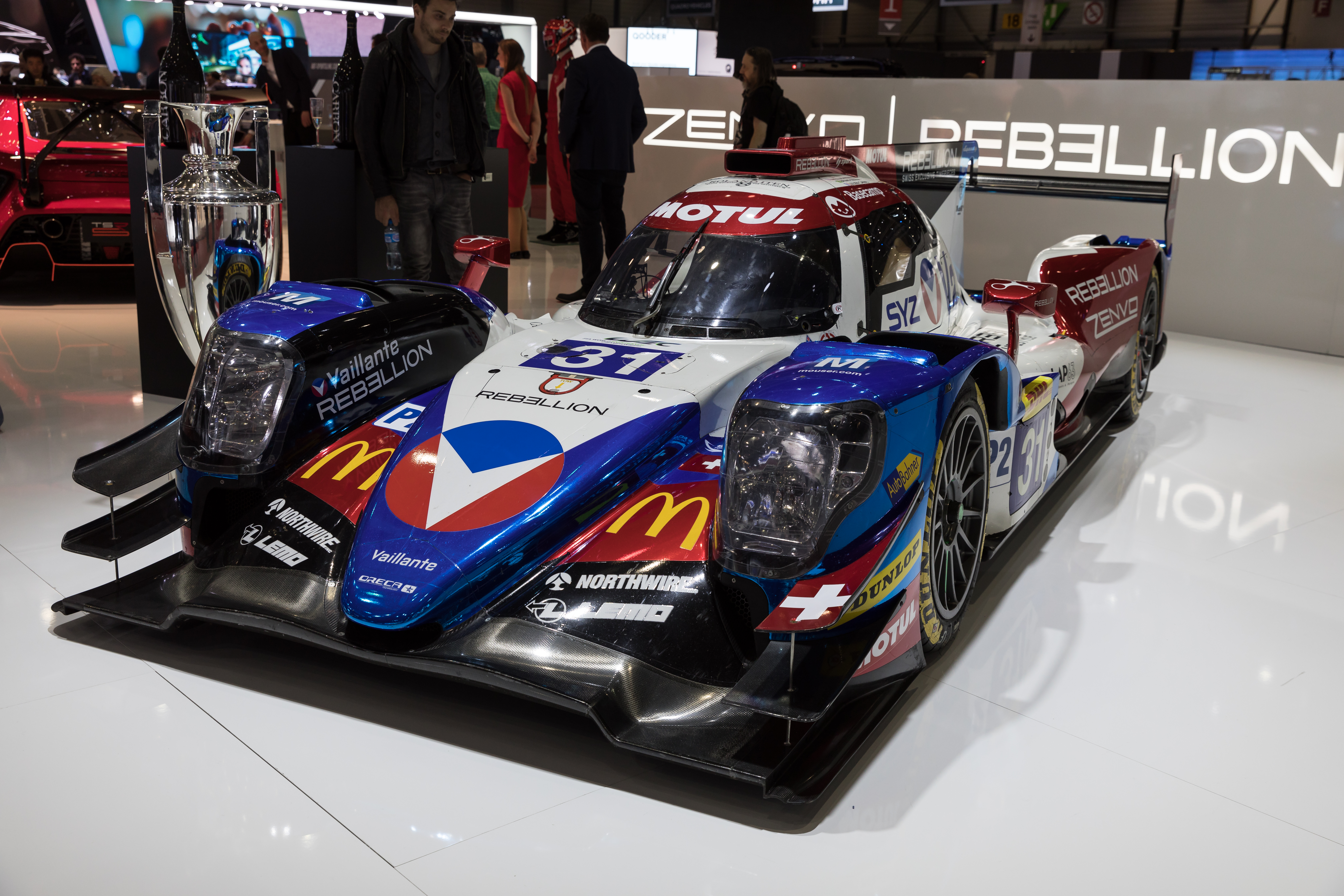
Rebellion Oreca 07 with LMP2 Endurance Trophy

After a four-year hiatus, Rebellion Racing participated in the WeatherTech SportsCar Championship which started at the 24 Hours of Daytona in January. The team also decided to switch to the LMP2-class in the 2017 FIA World Endurance Championship. The team was renamed Vaillante Rebellion, following a partnership with Editions Graton, the publishers of the French comic Vaillante.

In 2018, Rebellion returned to the LMP1 class with the new Rebellion R13 prototype, and two full season entries. They competed in both the 2018 and 2019 24 Hours of Le Mans, achieving a 3rd place in the 2018 edition. This season the team also achieved their first overall win in the WEC at the 6 Hours of Silverstone, after the two Toyota cars were disqualified after the race. The team finished 2nd in the teams' championship.

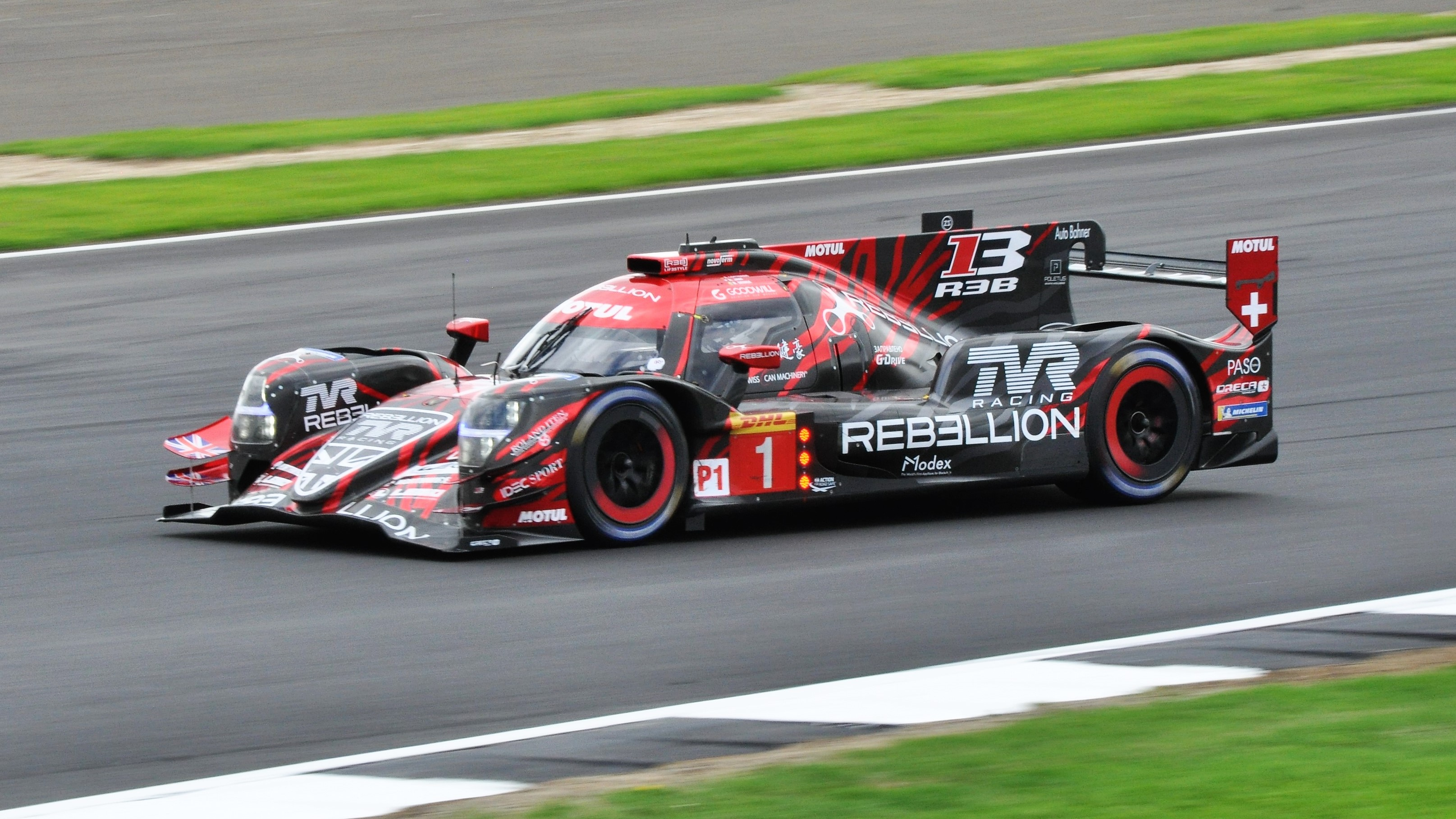
Rebellion's No. 1 R13 car took the team's first overall victory during the 2018 6 Hours of Silverstone

Rebellion Racing announced a single full-season entry for the 2019–20 FIA World Endurance Championship, with another entry set to be entered on a race-by-race basis depending on sponsorships. The second entry was raced at Silverstone, Spa and Le Mans. The team took their first "on track" victory at the 4 Hours of Shanghai, with the #1 car qualifying in 1st place and winning the race, becoming the first privateer team to do so in the WEC's history.

The same happened at that year's Lone Star Le Mans, where the team took their last win. Rebellion Racing's last race was that year's 24 Hours of Le Mans, the second to last race on the calendar, after which the team retired from motorsports following a decision taken by its parent company, Rebellion Corporation.

== Racing record ==
=== 24 Hours of Le Mans results ===
| Year | Entrant | No. | Car | Drivers | Class | Laps | Pos. | Class Pos. |
|---|---|---|---|---|---|---|---|---|
| 2008 | (Switzerland) Speedy Racing Team (United Kingdom) Sebah Automotive | 33 | Lola B08/80-Judd | (Italy) Andrea Belicchi (France) Xavier Pompidou (Switzerland) Steve Zacchia | LMP2 | 194 | DNF | DNF |
| 2008 | (Switzerland) Speedy Racing Team | 94 | Spyker C8 Laviolette GT2-R | (Switzerland) Iradj Alexander (Switzerland) Andrea Chiesa (Switzerland) Benjamin Leuenberger | GT2 | 72 | DNF | DNF |
| 2009 | (Switzerland) Speedy Racing Team (United Kingdom) Sebah Automotive | 13 | Lola B08/60-Aston Martin | (Italy) Andrea Belicchi (Switzerland) Neel Jani (France) Nico Prost | LMP1 | 342 | 14th | 12th |
| 2009 | (Switzerland) Speedy Racing Team (United Kingdom) Sebah Automotive | 33 | Lola B08/80-Judd | (United Kingdom) Jonny Kane (Switzerland) Benjamin Leuenberger (France) Xavier Pompidou | LMP2 | 343 | 12th | 2nd |
| 2010 | (Switzerland) Rebellion Racing | 12 | Lola B10/60-Rebellion | (United States) Marco Andretti (Switzerland) Neel Jani (France) Nico Prost | LMP1 | 175 | DNF | DNF |
| 2010 | (Switzerland) Rebellion Racing | 13 | Lola B10/60-Rebellion | (Italy) Andrea Belicchi (France) Jean-Christophe Boullion (United Kingdom) Guy Smith | LMP1 | 143 | DNF | DNF |
| 2011 | (Switzerland) Rebellion Racing | 12 | Lola B10/60-Toyota | (Netherlands) Jeroen Bleekemolen (Switzerland) Neel Jani (France) Nico Prost | LMP1 | 338 | 6th | 6th |
| 2011 | (Switzerland) Rebellion Racing | 13 | Lola B10/60-Toyota | (Italy) Andrea Belicchi (France) Jean-Christophe Boullion (United Kingdom) Guy Smith | LMP1 | 190 | DNF | DNF |
| 2012 | (Switzerland) Rebellion Racing | 12 | Lola B12/60-Toyota | (Germany) Nick Heidfeld (Switzerland) Neel Jani (France) Nico Prost | LMP1 | 367 | 4th | 4th |
| 2012 | (Switzerland) Rebellion Racing | 13 | Lola B12/60-Toyota | (Italy) Andrea Belicchi (Netherlands) Jeroen Bleekemolen (Switzerland) Harold Primat | LMP1 | 350 | 11th | 7th |
| 2013 | (Switzerland) Rebellion Racing | 12 | Lola B12/60-Toyota | (Germany) Nick Heidfeld (Switzerland) Neel Jani (France) Nico Prost | LMP1 | 275 | 39th | 7th |
| 2013 | (Switzerland) Rebellion Racing | 13 | Lola B12/60-Toyota | (Switzerland) Mathias Beche (Italy) Andrea Belicchi (China) Congfu Cheng | LMP1 | 275 | 40th | 8th |
| 2014 | (Switzerland) Rebellion Racing | 12 | Rebellion R-One-Toyota | (Switzerland) Mathias Beche (Germany) Nick Heidfeld (France) Nico Prost | LMP1-L | 360 | 4th | 1st |
| 2014 | (Switzerland) Rebellion Racing | 13 | Rebellion R-One-Toyota | (Italy) Andrea Belicchi (Austria) Dominik Kraihamer (Switzerland) Fabio Leimer | LMP1-L | 73 | DNF | DNF |
| 2015 | (Switzerland) Rebellion Racing | 12 | Rebellion R-One-AER | (Switzerland) Mathias Beche (Germany) Nick Heidfeld (France) Nico Prost | LMP1 | 330 | 23rd | 10th |
| 2015 | (Switzerland) Rebellion Racing | 13 | Rebellion R-One-AER | (Germany) Daniel Abt (Switzerland) Alexandre Imperatori (Austria) Dominik Kraihamer | LMP1 | 336 | 18th | 9th |
| 2016 | (Switzerland) Rebellion Racing | 12 | Rebellion R-One-AER | (Germany) Nick Heidfeld (Brazil) Nelson Piquet Jr. (France) Nico Prost | LMP1 | 330 | 29th | 6th |
| 2016 | (Switzerland) Rebellion Racing | 13 | Rebellion R-One-AER | (Switzerland) Alexandre Imperatori (Austria) Dominik Kraihamer (Switzerland) Mathéo Tuscher | LMP1 | 200 | DNF | DNF |
| 2017 | (Switzerland) Vaillante Rebellion | 13 | Oreca 07-Gibson | (Switzerland) Mathias Beche (Denmark) David Heinemeier Hansson (Brazil) Nelson Piquet Jr. | LMP2 | 364 | DSQ | DSQ |
| 2017 | (Switzerland) Vaillante Rebellion | 31 | Oreca 07-Gibson | (France) Julien Canal (France) Nico Prost (Brazil) Bruno Senna | LMP2 | 340 | 16th | 14th |
| 2018 | (Switzerland) Rebellion Racing | 1 | Rebellion R13-Gibson | (Switzerland) Neel Jani (Germany) André Lotterer (Brazil) Bruno Senna | LMP1 | 375 | 4th | 4th |
| 2018 | (Switzerland) Rebellion Racing | 3 | Rebellion R13-Gibson | (Switzerland) Mathias Beche (France) Thomas Laurent (United States) Gustavo Menezes | LMP1 | 376 | 3rd | 3rd |
| 2019 | (Switzerland) Rebellion Racing | 1 | Rebellion R13-Gibson | (Switzerland) Neel Jani (Germany) André Lotterer (Brazil) Bruno Senna | LMP1 | 376 | 4th | 4th |
| 2019 | (Switzerland) Rebellion Racing | 3 | Rebellion R13-Gibson | (France) Nathanaël Berthon (France) Thomas Laurent (United States) Gustavo Menezes | LMP1 | 370 | 5th | 5th |
| 2020 | (Switzerland) Rebellion Racing | 1 | Rebellion R13-Gibson | (United States) Gustavo Menezes (France) Norman Nato (Brazil) Bruno Senna | LMP1 | 382 | 2nd | 2nd |
| 2020 | (Switzerland) Rebellion Racing | 3 | Rebellion R13-Gibson | (France) Nathanaël Berthon (Switzerland) Louis Delétraz (France) Romain Dumas | LMP1 | 381 | 4th | 4th |

=== Le Mans Series results ===
Le Mans Series results
| Year | Class | Car | No. | Drivers | Races | Wins | Poles | Fast laps | Points | T.C. |
|---|---|---|---|---|---|---|---|---|---|---|
| 2007 | GT2 | Spyker C8 Spyder GT2-R | 94 | (United Kingdom) Jonny Kane (Switzerland) Andrea Chiesa (Italy) Andrea Belicchi | 5 | 0 | 0 | 0 | 14 | 6th |
| 2008 | LMP2 | Lola B08/80-Judd | 33 | (Italy) Andrea Belicchi (France) Xavier Pompidou (Switzerland) Steve Zacchia | 1 | 0 | 0 | 0 | 8 | 7th |
| 2008 | GT2 | Spyker C8 Laviolette GT2-R | 94 | (Switzerland) Andrea Chiesa (Switzerland) Benjamin Leuenberger (Switzerland) Iradj Alexander | 5 | 0 | 0 | 0 | 11 | 7th |
| 2009 | LMP1 | Lola B08/60-Aston Martin | 13 | (Switzerland) Marcel Fässler (Italy) Andrea Belicchi (France) Nico Prost | 5 | 0 | 0 | 0 | 14 | 5th |
| 2009 | LMP2 | Lola B08/80-Judd | 33 | (France) Xavier Pompidou (United Kingdom) Jonny Kane (Switzerland) Benjamin Leuenberger | 5 | 1 | 0 | 0 | 24 | 2nd |
| 2010 | LMP1 | Lola B10/60-Rebellion | 12 | (Switzerland) Neel Jani (France) Nico Prost | 5 | 0 | 0 | 0 | 53 | 3rd |
| 2010 | LMP1 | Lola B10/60-Rebellion | 13 | (Italy) Andrea Belicchi (France) Jean-Christophe Boullion (United Kingdom) Guy Smith | 5 | 0 | 1 | 0 | 44 | 5th |
| 2011 | LMP1 | Lola B10/60-Toyota | 12; 13 | (Switzerland) Neel Jani (France) Nico Prost (Italy) Andrea Belicchi (France) Jean-Christophe Boullion | 5 | 0 | 2 | 2 | 51 | 1st |
