= Lola B10/60 =

British sports prototype race car

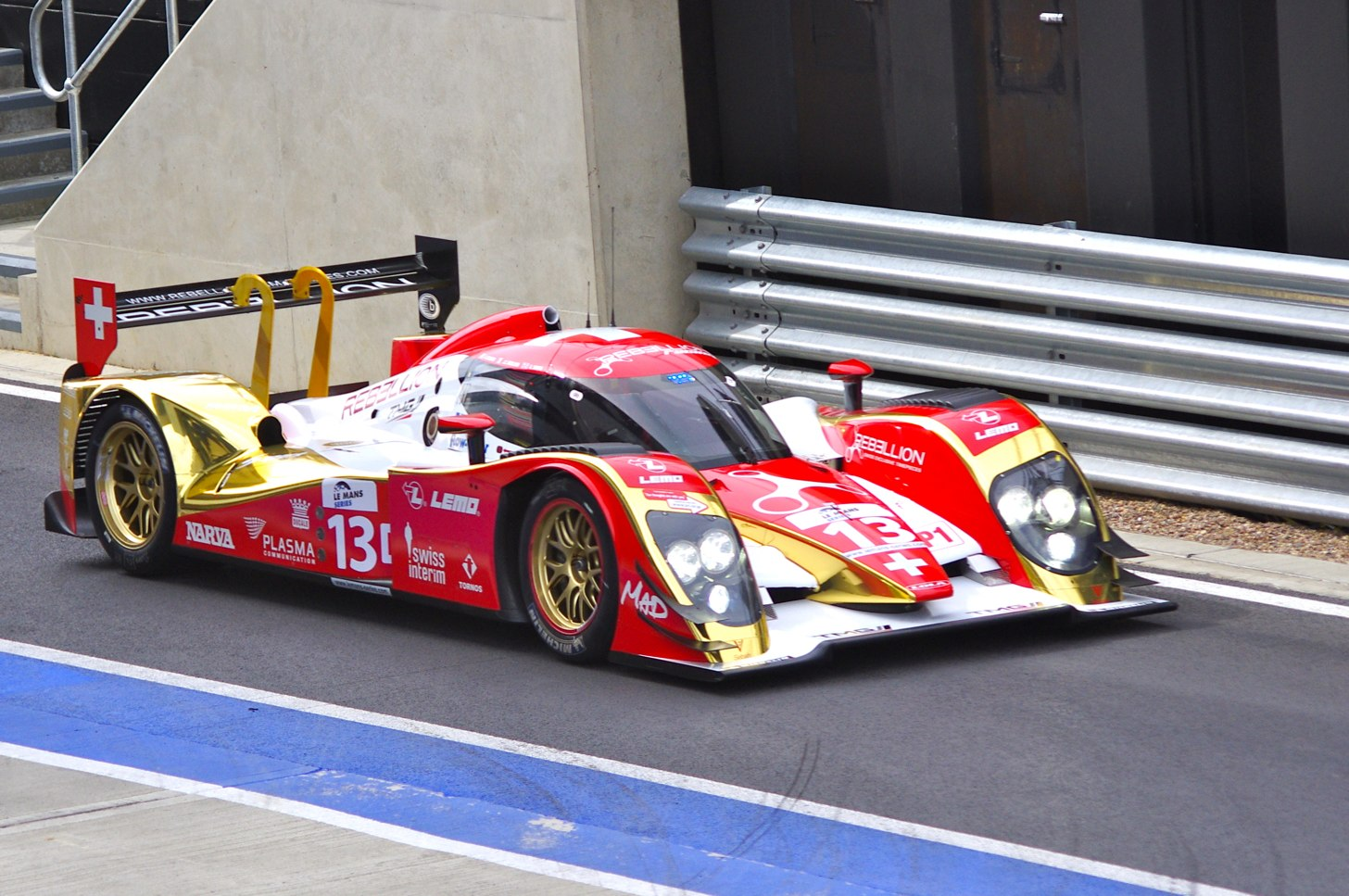
- The No. 13 B10/60 of Rebellion Racing during the 2011 6 Hours of Silverstone
- Category: LMP1
- Constructor: Lola
- Designer: Julian Sole
- Predecessor: Lola B09/60
- Successor: Lola B11/60

Technical specifications
- Chassis: Carbon-fiber monocoque with semi-stressed engine, carbon fiber composite body
- Suspension (front): Double wishbones, push-rod actuated coil springs and shock absorbers
- Suspension (rear): Double wishbones, push-rod actuated coil springs and shock absorbers
- Length: 4,634 mm (182 in)
- Width: 1,990 mm (78 in)
- Wheelbase: 2,890 mm (114 in)
- Engine: Judd GV5.5 5.5 L (336 cu in) 90° DOHC V10 naturally-aspirated mid-engined Toyota RV8KLM 3.4 L (207 cu in) 90° DOHC V8 naturally-aspirated mid-engined
- Torque: 290 lb⋅ft (390 N⋅m) (Toyota engine); 550 lb⋅ft (750 N⋅m) (Judd engine)
- Transmission: Xtrac #P259 6-speed sequential
- Power: 525 hp (391 kW) (Toyota engine); 650–700 hp (480–520 kW) (Judd engine)
- Weight: 900 kg (1,984 lb)

Competition history
- Notable entrants: (Switzerland) Rebellion Racing (United Kingdom) Drayson Racing
- Debut: 2010 8 Hours of Castellet
- Last event: 2011 6 Hours of Zhuhai
Entries	Podiums
33	4
- Teams' Championships: 1: Rebellion Racing (2011)

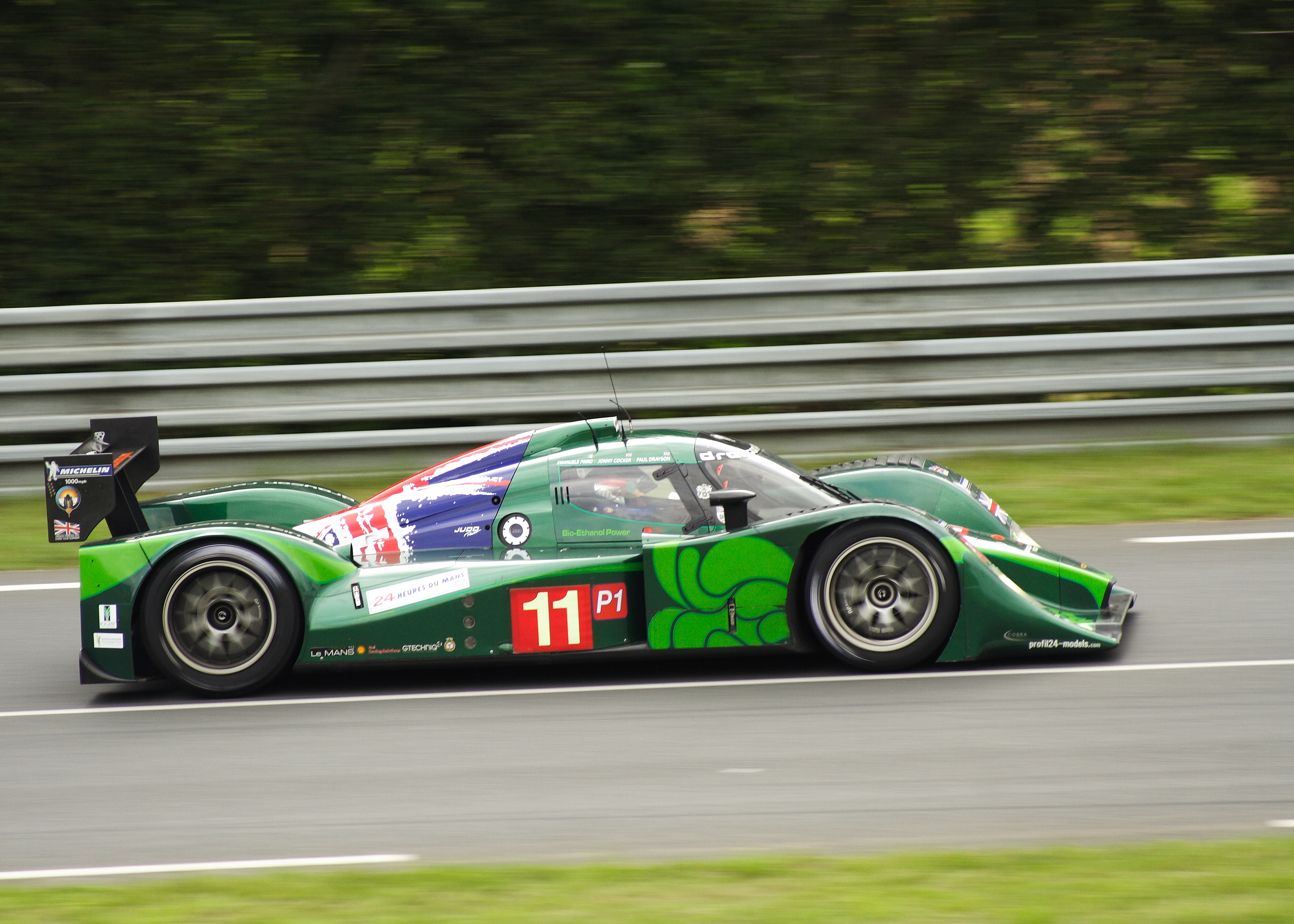
24 Hours of Le Mans 2010 - Drayson Racing #11.

Lola B10/60 is a sports prototype race car, designed, developed, and produced by British manufacturer Lola, and built to LMP1 rules and regulations, in 2010. It was Lola's attempt to compete in the European Le Mans Series, American Le Mans Series, and Intercontinental Le Mans Cup. It was entered by the Rebellion Racing team for the 2010 Le Mans Series season, and Drayson Racing for the 2010 American Le Mans Series season.

== Racing history ==
=== 24 Hours of Le Mans ===
Three Judd-powered Lola B10/60's were entered in the 2010 24 Hours of Le Mans; one by Drayson Racing, a team also participating in the American Le Mans Series, and two by Rebellion Racing, a team also entered in the Le Mans Series.

None of these three cars were classified at the end of the race.

== Awards ==
=== American Le Mans Series ===
- Winner at Road America in 2010

=== European Le Mans Series ===
- 3rd in the LMP1 category in 2010 with Rebellion Racing
- Champion in the LMP1 category in 2011 with Rebellion Racing
