= 2005 Petit Le Mans =

Sportscar endurance race in Georgia, US

The Track map of Road Atlanta

The 2005 Petit Le Mans was the ninth race for the 2005 American Le Mans Series season held at Road Atlanta. It took place on October 1, 2005.

== Official results ==
Class winners in bold. Cars failing to complete 70% of winner's distance marked as Not Classified (NC).

Pos	Class	No	Team	Drivers	Chassis	Tyre	Laps
Pos	Class	No	Team	Drivers	Engine	Tyre	Laps
1	**LMP1**	**2**	**(United States) ADT Champion Racing**	**(Germany) Frank Biela (Italy) Emanuele Pirro**	**Audi R8**	M	**394**
1	**LMP1**	**2**	**(United States) ADT Champion Racing**	**(Germany) Frank Biela (Italy) Emanuele Pirro**	**Audi 3.6L Turbo V8**	M	**394**
2	LMP1	20	(United States) Dyson Racing	(United States) Chris Dyson (United Kingdom) Guy Smith	MG-Lola EX257	M	382
2	LMP1	20	(United States) Dyson Racing	(United States) Chris Dyson (United Kingdom) Guy Smith	MG (AER) XP20 2.0L Turbo I4	M	382
3	**GT1**	**4**	**(United States) Corvette Racing**	**(United Kingdom) Oliver Gavin (Monaco) Olivier Beretta (Denmark) Jan Magnussen**	**Chevrolet Corvette C6.R**	M	**379**
3	**GT1**	**4**	**(United States) Corvette Racing**	**(United Kingdom) Oliver Gavin (Monaco) Olivier Beretta (Denmark) Jan Magnussen**	**Chevrolet 7.0L V8**	M	**379**
4	GT1	57	(United Kingdom) Aston Martin Racing	(Australia) David Brabham (United Kingdom) Darren Turner (United Kingdom) Jonny Kane	Aston Martin DBR9	M	378
4	GT1	57	(United Kingdom) Aston Martin Racing	(Australia) David Brabham (United Kingdom) Darren Turner (United Kingdom) Jonny Kane	Aston Martin 6.0L V12	M	378
5	**LMP2**	**37**	**(United States) Intersport Racing**	**(United States) Jon Field (United States) Clint Field (United Kingdom) Liz Halliday**	**Lola B05/40**	G	**375**
5	**LMP2**	**37**	**(United States) Intersport Racing**	**(United States) Jon Field (United States) Clint Field (United Kingdom) Liz Halliday**	**AER P07 2.0L Turbo I4**	G	**375**
6	GT1	63	(United States) ACEMCO Motorsports	(United States) Terry Borcheller (United Kingdom) Johnny Mowlem (Germany) Ralf Kelleners	Saleen S7-R	M	373
6	GT1	63	(United States) ACEMCO Motorsports	(United States) Terry Borcheller (United Kingdom) Johnny Mowlem (Germany) Ralf Kelleners	Ford 7.0L V8	M	373
7	LMP1	1	(United States) ADT Champion Racing	(Germany) Marco Werner (Finland) JJ Lehto	Audi R8	M	372
7	LMP1	1	(United States) ADT Champion Racing	(Germany) Marco Werner (Finland) JJ Lehto	Audi 3.6L Turbo V8	M	372
8	GT1	35	(Italy) Maserati Corse (United States) Risi Competizione	(Italy) Andrea Bertolini (Italy) Fabio Babini (Italy) Fabrizio de Simone	Maserati MC12	P	371
8	GT1	35	(Italy) Maserati Corse (United States) Risi Competizione	(Italy) Andrea Bertolini (Italy) Fabio Babini (Italy) Fabrizio de Simone	Maserati 6.0L V12	P	371
9	**GT2**	**31**	**(United States) Petersen Motorsports (United States) White Lightning Racing**	**(United States) Patrick Long (Germany) Jörg Bergmeister**	**Porsche 911 GT3-RSR**	M	**364**
9	**GT2**	**31**	**(United States) Petersen Motorsports (United States) White Lightning Racing**	**(United States) Patrick Long (Germany) Jörg Bergmeister**	**Porsche 3.6L Flat-6**	M	**364**
10	GT2	24	(United States) Alex Job Racing	(United States) Ian Baas (Germany) Marcel Tiemann (France) Emmanuel Collard	Porsche 911 GT3-RSR	M	363
10	GT2	24	(United States) Alex Job Racing	(United States) Ian Baas (Germany) Marcel Tiemann (France) Emmanuel Collard	Porsche 3.6L Flat-6	M	363
11	GT1	58	(United Kingdom) Aston Martin Racing	(Portugal) Pedro Lamy (Czech Republic) Tomáš Enge (Netherlands) Peter Kox	Aston Martin DBR9	M	359
11	GT1	58	(United Kingdom) Aston Martin Racing	(Portugal) Pedro Lamy (Czech Republic) Tomáš Enge (Netherlands) Peter Kox	Aston Martin 6.0L V12	M	359
12	GT1	3	(United States) Corvette Racing	(Canada) Ron Fellows (United States) Johnny O'Connell (Italy) Max Papis	Chevrolet Corvette C6.R	M	357
12	GT1	3	(United States) Corvette Racing	(Canada) Ron Fellows (United States) Johnny O'Connell (Italy) Max Papis	Chevrolet 7.0L V8	M	357
13	GT2	45	(United States) Flying Lizard Motorsports	(United States) Johannes van Overbeek (United States) Jon Fogarty (United States) Darren Law	Porsche 911 GT3-RSR	M	356
13	GT2	45	(United States) Flying Lizard Motorsports	(United States) Johannes van Overbeek (United States) Jon Fogarty (United States) Darren Law	Porsche 3.6L Flat-6	M	356
14	LMP2	8	(United States) B-K Motorsports	(United States) Guy Cosmo (United States) Jamie Bach (United States) Elliot Forbes-Robinson	Courage C65	G	354
14	LMP2	8	(United States) B-K Motorsports	(United States) Guy Cosmo (United States) Jamie Bach (United States) Elliot Forbes-Robinson	Mazda R20B 2.0L 3-Rotor	G	354
15	LMP1	12	(United States) Autocon Motorsports	(United States) Michael Lewis (United States) Bryan Willman	Riley & Scott Mk III C	D	350
15	LMP1	12	(United States) Autocon Motorsports	(United States) Michael Lewis (United States) Bryan Willman	Elan 6L8 6.0L V8	D	350
16	LMP2	7	(United States) BAT Competition	(United States) Bob Woodman (United States) Mike Johnson (France) Georges Forgeois	Lola B2K/40	Y	350
16	LMP2	7	(United States) BAT Competition	(United States) Bob Woodman (United States) Mike Johnson (France) Georges Forgeois	Nissan (AER) 3.0L V6	Y	350
17	GT2	23	(United States) Alex Job Racing	(Germany) Timo Bernhard (France) Romain Dumas	Porsche 911 GT3-RSR	M	349
17	GT2	23	(United States) Alex Job Racing	(Germany) Timo Bernhard (France) Romain Dumas	Porsche 3.6L Flat-6	M	349
18	GT2	43	(United States) BAM!	(Germany) Mike Rockenfeller (Germany) Wolf Henzler (Denmark) Martin Jensen	Porsche 911 GT3-RSR	Y	343
18	GT2	43	(United States) BAM!	(Germany) Mike Rockenfeller (Germany) Wolf Henzler (Denmark) Martin Jensen	Porsche 3.6L Flat-6	Y	343
19	GT2	79	(United States) J3 Racing	(United States) Justin Jackson (Sweden) Niclas Jönsson (United Kingdom) Tim Sugden	Porsche 911 GT3-RSR	P	324
19	GT2	79	(United States) J3 Racing	(United States) Justin Jackson (Sweden) Niclas Jönsson (United Kingdom) Tim Sugden	Porsche 3.6L Flat-6	P	324
20	GT1	71	(United States) Carsport America	(Italy) Michele Rugolo (United States) Tom Weickardt (France) Jean-Philippe Belloc	Dodge Viper GTS-R	P	304
20	GT1	71	(United States) Carsport America	(Italy) Michele Rugolo (United States) Tom Weickardt (France) Jean-Philippe Belloc	Dodge 8.0L V10	P	304
21 NC	GT2	51	(United States) Panoz Motor Sports	(United States) Bryan Sellers (United Kingdom) Marino Franchitti (United States) Gunnar Jeannette	Panoz Esperante GT-LM	P	258
21 NC	GT2	51	(United States) Panoz Motor Sports	(United States) Bryan Sellers (United Kingdom) Marino Franchitti (United States) Gunnar Jeannette	Ford (Elan) 5.0L V8	P	258
22 DNF	GT2	78	(United States) J3 Racing	(United States) Michael Cawley (United States) Leh Keen (Canada) Andy Burgess	Porsche 911 GT3-RS	P	253
22 DNF	GT2	78	(United States) J3 Racing	(United States) Michael Cawley (United States) Leh Keen (Canada) Andy Burgess	Porsche 3.6L Flat-6	P	253
23 DNF	LMP2	30	(Germany) Barazi-Kruse Motorsport	(Denmark) Juan Barazi (United Kingdom) Philipp Bennett (United States) Elton Julian	Courage C65	P	225
23 DNF	LMP2	30	(Germany) Barazi-Kruse Motorsport	(Denmark) Juan Barazi (United Kingdom) Philipp Bennett (United States) Elton Julian	AER P07 2.0L Turbo I4	P	225
24 DNF	LMP2	10	(United States) Miracle Motorsports	(United States) Jeff Bucknum (United States) Chris McMurry (United States) James Gue	Courage C65	K	197
24 DNF	LMP2	10	(United States) Miracle Motorsports	(United States) Jeff Bucknum (United States) Chris McMurry (United States) James Gue	AER P07 2.0L Turbo I4	K	197
25 DNF	LMP2	41	(United States) Binnie Motorsports	(United States) William Binnie (United Kingdom) Alan Timpany (United Kingdom) Sam Hancock	Lola B05/40	P	195
25 DNF	LMP2	41	(United States) Binnie Motorsports	(United States) William Binnie (United Kingdom) Alan Timpany (United Kingdom) Sam Hancock	Nicholson-McLaren 3.3L V8	P	195
26 DNF	LMP1	16	(United States) Dyson Racing	(United States) Butch Leitzinger (United Kingdom) Andy Wallace (United Kingdom) James Weaver	MG-Lola EX257	M	164
26 DNF	LMP1	16	(United States) Dyson Racing	(United States) Butch Leitzinger (United Kingdom) Andy Wallace (United Kingdom) James Weaver	MG (AER) XP20 2.0L Turbo I4	M	164
27 NC	GT2	50	(United States) Panoz Motor Sports	(United States) Bill Auberlen (United Kingdom) Robin Liddell (Canada) Scott Maxwell	Panoz Esperante GT-LM	P	90
27 NC	GT2	50	(United States) Panoz Motor Sports	(United States) Bill Auberlen (United Kingdom) Robin Liddell (Canada) Scott Maxwell	Ford (Elan) 5.0L V8	P	90
28 DNF	GT2	44	(United States) Flying Lizard Motorsports	(United States) Lonnie Pechnik (United States) Seth Neiman (United States) David Murry	Porsche 911 GT3-RSR	M	89
28 DNF	GT2	44	(United States) Flying Lizard Motorsports	(United States) Lonnie Pechnik (United States) Seth Neiman (United States) David Murry	Porsche 3.6L Flat-6	M	89
29 DNF	LMP2	19	(United States) Van der Steur Racing	(United States) Gunnar van der Steur (United States) Eric van der Steur (United Kingdom) Ben Devlin	Lola B2K/40	D	7
29 DNF	LMP2	19	(United States) Van der Steur Racing	(United States) Gunnar van der Steur (United States) Eric van der Steur (United Kingdom) Ben Devlin	Nissan (AER) 3.0L V6	D	7
30 DNF	LMP1	15	(United Kingdom) Zytek Engineering	(United Kingdom) Tom Chilton (Japan) Hayanari Shimoda	Zytek 04S	M	0
30 DNF	LMP1	15	(United Kingdom) Zytek Engineering	(United Kingdom) Tom Chilton (Japan) Hayanari Shimoda	Zytek ZG348 3.4L V8	M	0

== Statistics ==
- Pole Position - #15 Zytek Engineering - 1:10.781
- Fastest Lap - #1 ADT Champion Racing - 1:12.958
- Average Speed - 107.929 mph (173.695 km/h)

American Le Mans Series
Previous race: 2005 Grand Prix of Mosport	2005 season	Next race: 2005 Monterey Sports Car Championships
