= 2000 12 Hours of Sebring =

Sports car endurance race

Sebring International Raceway

The 2000 Exxon Superflo 12 Hours of Sebring was the 48th running of the 12 Hours of Sebring as well as the opening round of the 2000 American Le Mans Series season. It took place at Sebring International Raceway, Florida, on March 18, 2000. This was the first time ever the 12 Hours was covered flag-to-flag on television with Speedvision doing the honors.

== Race results ==
Class winners in bold.

Pos	Class	No	Team	Drivers	Chassis	Tyre	Laps
Pos	Class	No	Team	Drivers	Engine	Tyre	Laps
1	**LMP**	**78**	**(Germany) Audi Sport North America**	**(Germany) Frank Biela (Italy) Emanuele Pirro (Denmark) Tom Kristensen**	**Audi R8**	MI	**360**
1	**LMP**	**78**	**(Germany) Audi Sport North America**	**(Germany) Frank Biela (Italy) Emanuele Pirro (Denmark) Tom Kristensen**	**Audi 3.6 L Turbo V8**	MI	**360**
2	LMP	77	(Germany) Audi Sport North America	(Italy) Rinaldo Capello (Italy) Michele Alboreto (United Kingdom) Allan McNish	Audi R8	MI	360
2	LMP	77	(Germany) Audi Sport North America	(Italy) Rinaldo Capello (Italy) Michele Alboreto (United Kingdom) Allan McNish	Audi 3.6 L Turbo V8	MI	360
3	LMP	42	(Germany) BMW Motorsport (Germany) Schnitzer Motorsport	(Germany) Jörg Müller (Finland) JJ Lehto	BMW V12 LMR	MI	359
3	LMP	42	(Germany) BMW Motorsport (Germany) Schnitzer Motorsport	(Germany) Jörg Müller (Finland) JJ Lehto	BMW S70 6.0 L V12	MI	359
4	LMP	43	(Germany) BMW Motorsport (Germany) Schnitzer Motorsport	(France) Jean-Marc Gounon (United Kingdom) Steve Soper (United States) Bill Auberlen	BMW V12 LMR	MI	358
4	LMP	43	(Germany) BMW Motorsport (Germany) Schnitzer Motorsport	(France) Jean-Marc Gounon (United Kingdom) Steve Soper (United States) Bill Auberlen	BMW S70 6.0 L V12	MI	358
5	LMP	27	(United States) Doran Lista Racing	(Belgium) Didier Theys (Italy) Mauro Baldi (Switzerland) Fredy Lienhard	Ferrari 333 SP	MI	337
5	LMP	27	(United States) Doran Lista Racing	(Belgium) Didier Theys (Italy) Mauro Baldi (Switzerland) Fredy Lienhard	Judd GV4 4.0 L V10	MI	337
6	LMP	19	(United States) Team Cadillac	(South Africa) Wayne Taylor (Belgium) Eric van de Poele (Italy) Max Angelelli	Cadillac Northstar LMP	P	331
6	LMP	19	(United States) Team Cadillac	(South Africa) Wayne Taylor (Belgium) Eric van de Poele (Italy) Max Angelelli	Cadillac Northstar 4.0 L Turbo V8	P	331
7	**GTS**	**91**	**(France) Viper Team Oreca**	**(France) Dominique Dupuy (Monaco) Olivier Beretta (Austria) Karl Wendlinger**	**Dodge Viper GTS-R**	MI	**327**
7	**GTS**	**91**	**(France) Viper Team Oreca**	**(France) Dominique Dupuy (Monaco) Olivier Beretta (Austria) Karl Wendlinger**	**Dodge 8.0 L V10**	MI	**327**
8	GTS	92	(France) Viper Team Oreca	(United States) David Donohue (United States) Tommy Archer (Belgium) Marc Duez	Dodge Viper GTS-R	MI	326
8	GTS	92	(France) Viper Team Oreca	(United States) David Donohue (United States) Tommy Archer (Belgium) Marc Duez	Dodge 8.0 L V10	MI	326
9	GTS	93	(France) Viper Team Oreca	(France) Jean-Philippe Belloc (France) Anthony Beltoise (Portugal) Ni Amorim	Dodge Viper GTS-R	MI	321
9	GTS	93	(France) Viper Team Oreca	(France) Jean-Philippe Belloc (France) Anthony Beltoise (Portugal) Ni Amorim	Dodge 8.0 L V10	MI	321
10	**GT**	**5**	**(United States) Dick Barbour Racing**	**(Germany) Dirk Müller (Germany) Lucas Luhr**	**Porsche 911 GT3-R**	MI	**313**
10	**GT**	**5**	**(United States) Dick Barbour Racing**	**(Germany) Dirk Müller (Germany) Lucas Luhr**	**Porsche 3.6 L Flat-6**	MI	**313**
11	GT	70	(Australia) Skea Racing International	(United Kingdom) Johnny Mowlem (United States) David Murry	Porsche 911 GT3-R	P	308
11	GT	70	(Australia) Skea Racing International	(United Kingdom) Johnny Mowlem (United States) David Murry	Porsche 3.6 L Flat-6	P	308
12	GTS	33	(Germany) Konrad Motorsport	(Austria) Franz Konrad (United States) Charles Slater (United States) John Paul Jr.	Porsche 911 GT2	D	307
12	GTS	33	(Germany) Konrad Motorsport	(Austria) Franz Konrad (United States) Charles Slater (United States) John Paul Jr.	Porsche 3.8 L Turbo Flat-6	D	307
13	GT	03	(United States) Reiser Callas Rennsport	(United States) Hurley Haywood (United States) Craig Stanton (United States) Joel Reiser	Porsche 911 GT3-R	Y	306
13	GT	03	(United States) Reiser Callas Rennsport	(United States) Hurley Haywood (United States) Craig Stanton (United States) Joel Reiser	Porsche 3.6 L Flat-6	Y	306
14	GT	07	(Germany) RWS Motorsport	(Austria) Dieter Quester (Austria) Philipp Peter (Italy) Luca Riccitelli	Porsche 911 GT3-R	MI	302
14	GT	07	(Germany) RWS Motorsport	(Austria) Dieter Quester (Austria) Philipp Peter (Italy) Luca Riccitelli	Porsche 3.6 L Flat-6	MI	302
15	GT	41	(Switzerland) Team LR Organization	(France) Christophe Bouchut (Italy) Angelo Zadra	Porsche 911 GT3-R	Y	302
15	GT	41	(Switzerland) Team LR Organization	(France) Christophe Bouchut (Italy) Angelo Zadra	Porsche 3.6 L Flat-6	Y	302
16	GTS	4	(United States) Corvette Racing	(United States) Andy Pilgrim (United States) Kelly Collins (France) Franck Fréon	Chevrolet Corvette C5-R	G	300
16	GTS	4	(United States) Corvette Racing	(United States) Andy Pilgrim (United States) Kelly Collins (France) Franck Fréon	Chevrolet 7.0 L V8	G	300
17	GT	71	(Australia) Skea Racing International	(Australia) Rohan Skea (United States) Grady Willingham (United States) Lloyd Hawkins	Porsche 911 GT3-R	P	284
17	GT	71	(Australia) Skea Racing International	(Australia) Rohan Skea (United States) Grady Willingham (United States) Lloyd Hawkins	Porsche 3.6 L Flat-6	P	284
18	GT	87	(United States) Michael Colucci Racing (United States) Nygmatech	(United States) Tim Robertson (United Kingdom) Ian James (Portugal) João Barbosa	Porsche 911 Carrera RSR	P	276
18	GT	87	(United States) Michael Colucci Racing (United States) Nygmatech	(United States) Tim Robertson (United Kingdom) Ian James (Portugal) João Barbosa	Porsche 3.8 L Flat-6	P	276
19	GT	66	(United States) The Racer's Group	(United States) Kevin Buckler (United States) Robert Nagel (United States) Mike Fitzgerald	Porsche 911 GT3-R	G	266
19	GT	66	(United States) The Racer's Group	(United States) Kevin Buckler (United States) Robert Nagel (United States) Mike Fitzgerald	Porsche 3.6 L Flat-6	G	266
20	GT	89	(United States) Michael Colucci Racing (United States) Nygmatech	(United States) Dave Dullum (United States) James McCormick (United States) Kurt Baumann	Porsche 911 GT3-R	P	258
20	GT	89	(United States) Michael Colucci Racing (United States) Nygmatech	(United States) Dave Dullum (United States) James McCormick (United States) Kurt Baumann	Porsche 3.6 L Flat-6	P	258
21 DNF	GT	51	(United States) Dick Barbour Racing	(Germany) Sascha Maassen (France) Bob Wollek	Porsche 911 GT3-R	MI	251
21 DNF	GT	51	(United States) Dick Barbour Racing	(Germany) Sascha Maassen (France) Bob Wollek	Porsche 3.6 L Flat-6	MI	251
22 DNF	LMP	1	(United States) Panoz Motor Sports	(Australia) David Brabham (Denmark) Jan Magnussen (France) Pierre-Henri Raphanel	Panoz LMP-1 Roadster-S	MI	249
22 DNF	LMP	1	(United States) Panoz Motor Sports	(Australia) David Brabham (Denmark) Jan Magnussen (France) Pierre-Henri Raphanel	Élan 6L8 6.0 L V8	MI	249
23 DNF	GT	21	(United States) MCR Aspen Knolls	(United States) Shane Lewis (United States) Cort Wagner (United States) Bob Mazzuoccola	Porsche 911 GT3-R	P	229
23 DNF	GT	21	(United States) MCR Aspen Knolls	(United States) Shane Lewis (United States) Cort Wagner (United States) Bob Mazzuoccola	Porsche 3.6 L Flat-6	P	229
24 DNF	GTS	3	(United States) Corvette Racing	(United States) Chris Kneifel (Canada) Ron Fellows (United Kingdom) Justin Bell	Chevrolet Corvette C5-R	G	201
24 DNF	GTS	3	(United States) Corvette Racing	(United States) Chris Kneifel (Canada) Ron Fellows (United Kingdom) Justin Bell	Chevrolet 7.0 L V8	G	201
25	LMP	37	(United States) Intersport Racing	(United States) Jon Field (United States) Don Whittington (United States) Dale Whittington	Lola B98/10	G	181
25	LMP	37	(United States) Intersport Racing	(United States) Jon Field (United States) Don Whittington (United States) Dale Whittington	Ford 5.1 L V8	G	181
26 DNF	LMP	38	(United States) Champion Racing	(United States) Dorsey Schroeder (United Kingdom) James Weaver (Germany) Ralf Kelleners	Lola B2K/10	MI	165
26 DNF	LMP	38	(United States) Champion Racing	(United States) Dorsey Schroeder (United Kingdom) James Weaver (Germany) Ralf Kelleners	Porsche 3.6 L Turbo Flat-6	MI	165
27 DNF	LMP	31	(France) Motorola DAMS	(France) Emmanuel Collard (France) Éric Bernard	Cadillac Northstar LMP	P	163
27 DNF	LMP	31	(France) Motorola DAMS	(France) Emmanuel Collard (France) Éric Bernard	Cadillac Northstar 4.0 L Turbo V8	P	163
28	GT	88	(United States) Michael Colucci Racing (United States) Nygmatech	(United States) Leo Hindery (United States) Peter Baron (United States) Tony Kester	Porsche 911 GT3-R	P	147
28	GT	88	(United States) Michael Colucci Racing (United States) Nygmatech	(United States) Leo Hindery (United States) Peter Baron (United States) Tony Kester	Porsche 3.6 L Flat-6	P	147
29 DNF	GT	30	(United States) White Lightning Racing	(United States) Gunnar Jeannette (United States) Rod McLeod (Germany) Michael Lauer	Porsche 911 GT3-R	P	143
29 DNF	GT	30	(United States) White Lightning Racing	(United States) Gunnar Jeannette (United States) Rod McLeod (Germany) Michael Lauer	Porsche 3.6 L Flat-6	P	143
30 DNF	GT	6	(United States) Prototype Technology Group	(United States) Boris Said (United States) Johannes van Overbeek (Germany) Hans-Joachim Stuck	BMW M3	Y	141
30 DNF	GT	6	(United States) Prototype Technology Group	(United States) Boris Said (United States) Johannes van Overbeek (Germany) Hans-Joachim Stuck	BMW 3.2 L I6	Y	141
31 DNF	GTS	08	(United States) Roock Motorsport North America	(Germany) Claudia Hürtgen (Germany) Hubert Haupt (United States) Vic Rice	Porsche 911 GT2	Y	125
31 DNF	GTS	08	(United States) Roock Motorsport North America	(Germany) Claudia Hürtgen (Germany) Hubert Haupt (United States) Vic Rice	Porsche 3.8 L Turbo Flat-6	Y	125
32 DNF	LMP	06	(Canada) Multimatic Motorsports	(Canada) Scott Maxwell (Canada) John Graham (Canada) David Empringham	Lola B98/10	P	124
32 DNF	LMP	06	(Canada) Multimatic Motorsports	(Canada) Scott Maxwell (Canada) John Graham (Canada) David Empringham	Ford Cosworth XD 2.6 L Turbo V8	P	124
33 DNF	GT	10	(United States) Prototype Technology Group	(United States) Peter Cunningham (United States) Brian Cunningham (United States) Darren Law	BMW M3	Y	106
33 DNF	GT	10	(United States) Prototype Technology Group	(United States) Peter Cunningham (United States) Brian Cunningham (United States) Darren Law	BMW 3.2 L I6	Y	106
34 DNF	GT	52	(Germany) Seikel Motorsport	(United States) Philip Collin (United States) Kurt Mathewson (Canada) Tony Burgess	Porsche 911 GT3-R	D	105
34 DNF	GT	52	(Germany) Seikel Motorsport	(United States) Philip Collin (United States) Kurt Mathewson (Canada) Tony Burgess	Porsche 3.6 L Flat-6	D	105
35 DNF	LMP	9	(United States) Team Cadillac	(United Kingdom) Andy Wallace (France) Franck Lagorce	Cadillac Northstar LMP	P	87
35 DNF	LMP	9	(United States) Team Cadillac	(United Kingdom) Andy Wallace (France) Franck Lagorce	Cadillac Northstar 4.0 L Turbo V8	P	87
36 DNF	LMP	2	(United States) Panoz Motor Sports	(United States) Johnny O'Connell (Japan) Hiroki Katou	Panoz LMP-1 Roadster-S	MI	79
36 DNF	LMP	2	(United States) Panoz Motor Sports	(United States) Johnny O'Connell (Japan) Hiroki Katou	Élan 6L8 6.0 L V8	MI	79
37 DNF	GTS	09	(United States) Roock Motorsport North America	(United States) Zak Brown (United States) Stephen Earle (Austria) Manfred Jurasz	Porsche 911 GT2	Y	76
37 DNF	GTS	09	(United States) Roock Motorsport North America	(United States) Zak Brown (United States) Stephen Earle (Austria) Manfred Jurasz	Porsche 3.8 L Turbo Flat-6	Y	76
38 DNF	LMP	36	(United States) Johansson-Matthews Racing	(Sweden) Stefan Johansson (United Kingdom) Guy Smith (United States) Jim Matthews	Reynard 2KQ	Y	65
38 DNF	LMP	36	(United States) Johansson-Matthews Racing	(Sweden) Stefan Johansson (United Kingdom) Guy Smith (United States) Jim Matthews	Judd GV4 4.0 L V10	Y	65
39 DNF	GT	23	(United States) Alex Job Racing	(United States) Randy Pobst (United States) Mike Conte (Belgium) Bruno Lambert	Porsche 911 GT3-R	MI	59
39 DNF	GT	23	(United States) Alex Job Racing	(United States) Randy Pobst (United States) Mike Conte (Belgium) Bruno Lambert	Porsche 3.6 L Flat-6	MI	59
40 DNF	LMP	0	(Italy) Team Rafanelli SRL	(Italy) Mimmo Schiattarella (Italy) Pierluigi Martini (Belgium) Didier de Radiguès	Lola B2K/10	MI	52
40 DNF	LMP	0	(Italy) Team Rafanelli SRL	(Italy) Mimmo Schiattarella (Italy) Pierluigi Martini (Belgium) Didier de Radiguès	Judd (Rafanelli) GV4 4.0 L V10	MI	52
41 DNF	LMP	74	(United States) Robinson Racing	(United States) George Robinson (United States) Irv Hoerr (United States) Jack Baldwin	Reynard 2KQ	G	48
41 DNF	LMP	74	(United States) Robinson Racing	(United States) George Robinson (United States) Irv Hoerr (United States) Jack Baldwin	Judd GV4 4.0 L V10	G	48
42 DNF	LMP	02	(Germany) Pole Team	(Germany) Norman Simon (Germany) Günther Blieninger (United States) Mark Simo	Riley & Scott Mk III	MI	8
42 DNF	LMP	02	(Germany) Pole Team	(Germany) Norman Simon (Germany) Günther Blieninger (United States) Mark Simo	Judd GV4 4.0 L V10	MI	8

== Statistics ==
- Pole Position LMP - #78 Audi Sport North America (Frank Biela) - 1:48.825
- Pole Position GTS - Ron Fellows #3 Corvette Racing - 1:59.646
- Pole Position GT - Dirk Muller #5 Dick Barbour Racing - 2:07.064
- Fastest Lap - #78 Audi Sport North America (Emanuele Pirro) - 1:50.287
- Distance - 2143.646 km
- Average Speed - 178.141 km/h

American Le Mans Series
Previous race: None	2000 season	Next race: 2000 Grand Prix of Charlotte
