= Frank Biela =

German racing driver (born 1964)

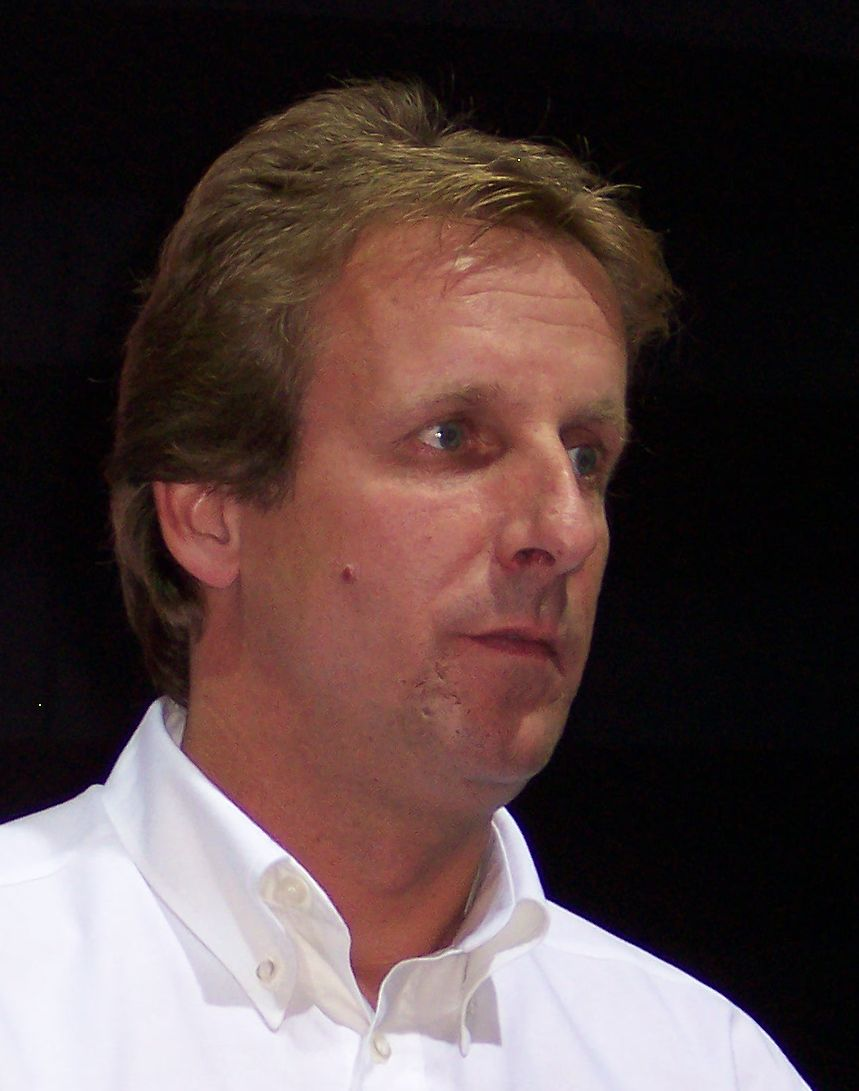
- Biela in 2006
- Nationality: (Germany) German
- Born: Frank Stanley Biela; 2 August 1964 (age 62); Neuss, West Germany

24 Hours of Le Mans career
- Years: 1999–2008
- Teams: Audi Sport Joest, Audi Sport UK, Champion Racing
- Best finish: 1st (2000, 2001, 2002, 2006, 2007)
- Class wins: 5 (2000, 2001, 2002, 2006, 2007)

Frank Stanley Biela (born 2 August 1964) is a German auto racing driver, mainly competing in touring cars and sportscar racing. He has raced exclusively in cars manufactured by the Audi marque since 1990. Biela notably won the 1991 Deutsche Tourenwagen Miesterschaft and the 1996 British Touring Car Championship, as well as the 24 Hours of Le Mans five times (Note: Specific years: 2000, 2001, 2002, 2006, 2007) and the 12 Hours of Sebring four times between 2000 and 2007. (Note: Specific years: 2000, 2003, 2004, 2007) Biela also won the 1996 Macau Guia Race in the Super Touring class.

== Career ==
Biela started his career in 1983 in karting before joining the Ford Youngster Team programme in 1987 alongside Manuel Reuter and Bernd Schneider. He drove for the team in Formula Ford and the Deutsche Tourenwagen Meisterschaft (the German touring car championship), where he won the race at AVUS in 1987. Biela continued to compete in the DTM in 1988, and also raced a limited season in German Formula Three, scoring two wins.

In 1990, Biela moved to Audi, winning the DTM race at the Nürburgring and the DTM championship in 1991 before Audi left the DTM in mid-season of 1992. Biela stayed with the company, and with the rise of the two-litre Class 2 (Super Touring) rules in other series across Europe, he was entered in various European touring car series over the following few seasons such as the French Supertouring Championship in 1993 driving the Audi 80 (in which he won the championship in) entered by Audi into the championship pairing alongside Marc Sourd. Since his French Supertouring Championship victory in 1993, he is the only standing non-French driver to win it. In 1995, he won the Touring Car World Cup race at Paul Ricard in the new Audi A4, which quickly became one of the dominant touring cars of the mid-1990s.

Biela also competed in the Super Tourenwagen Cup in his native Germany during 1994 and 1995; however his home championship would bring only frustration as in both years he dominated the first half of the season, only for late-season misfortunes to derail his title challenge, losing him the crown to BMW drivers Johnny Cecotto and Joachim Winkelhock respectively. During the AVUS Berlin race in September 1995, Biela's Audi struck Kieth O'dor's already accident-stranded Nissan Primera squarely on the driver's side, fatally injuring O'dor, who died later that day in a Berlin hospital.

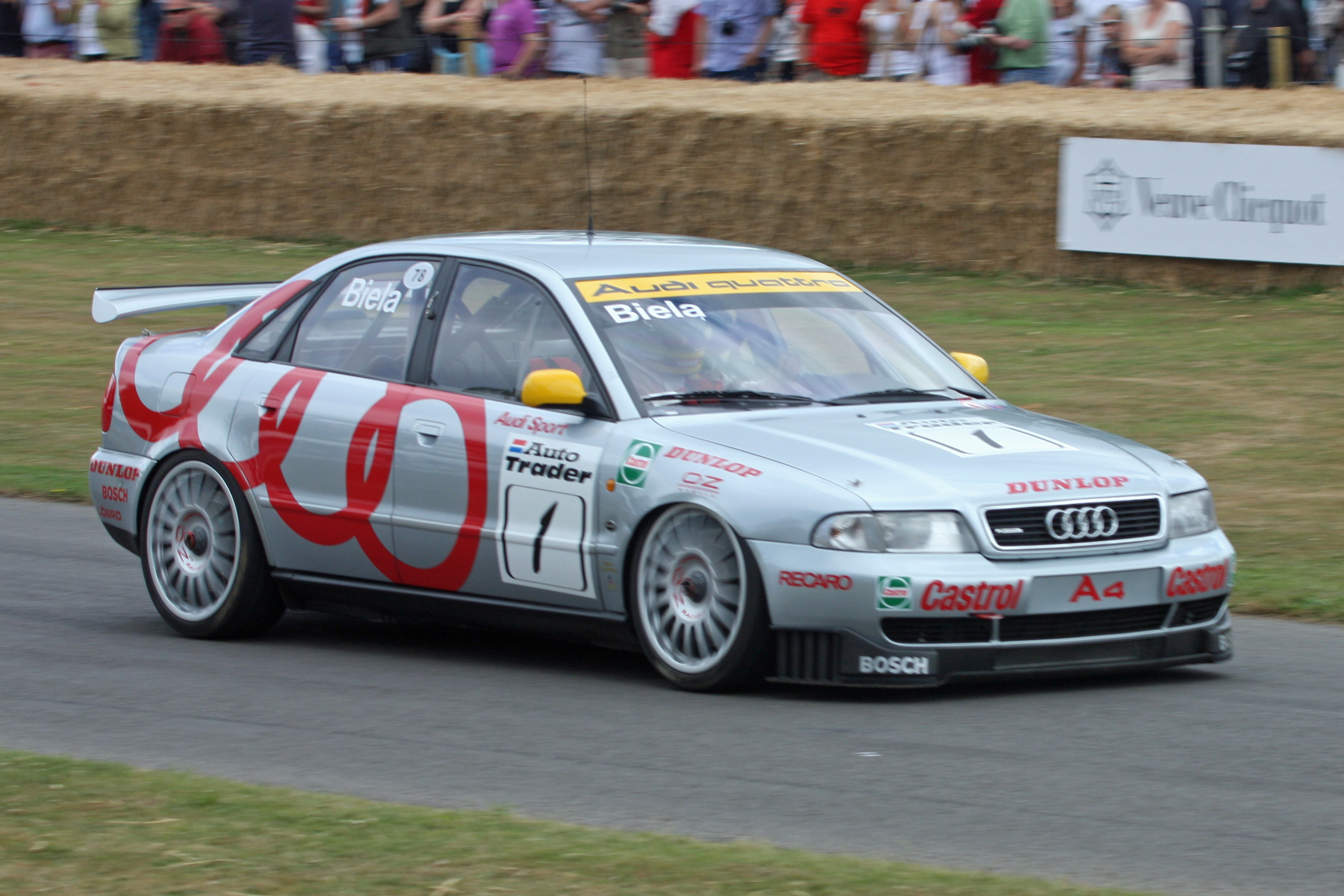
Biela's Audi A4 of the BTCC.

For 1996, Audi decided to enter a works team of two A4s in the BTCC. Biela was selected to lead the team; alongside team-mate John Bintcliffe, the new Audi team dominated the competition. Biela comfortably won the title, finishing every single race and being classified in the top ten in all but two races (an 11th-place finish and a disqualification). He also capped an astonishing season by taking first place in the Guia Race of Macau.

Because of the Audis' dominance in 1996, the BTCC organisers imposed a heavy ballast weight "penalty" on all four-wheel-drive cars for the 1997 season. With his Audi badly handicapped by the penalty, Biela initially struggled to make a serious impact. The weight penalty was halved at the midpoint of the season, and results immediately improved to the point where Biela finished second overall to eventual champion Alain Menu. Biela then left Britain to return to the German Super Tourenwagen Cup for 1998, but was largely ineffective. He finished a lowly 14th in the final standings as the A4 (in a new two-wheel-drive racing configuration) became outclassed by rival manufacturers.

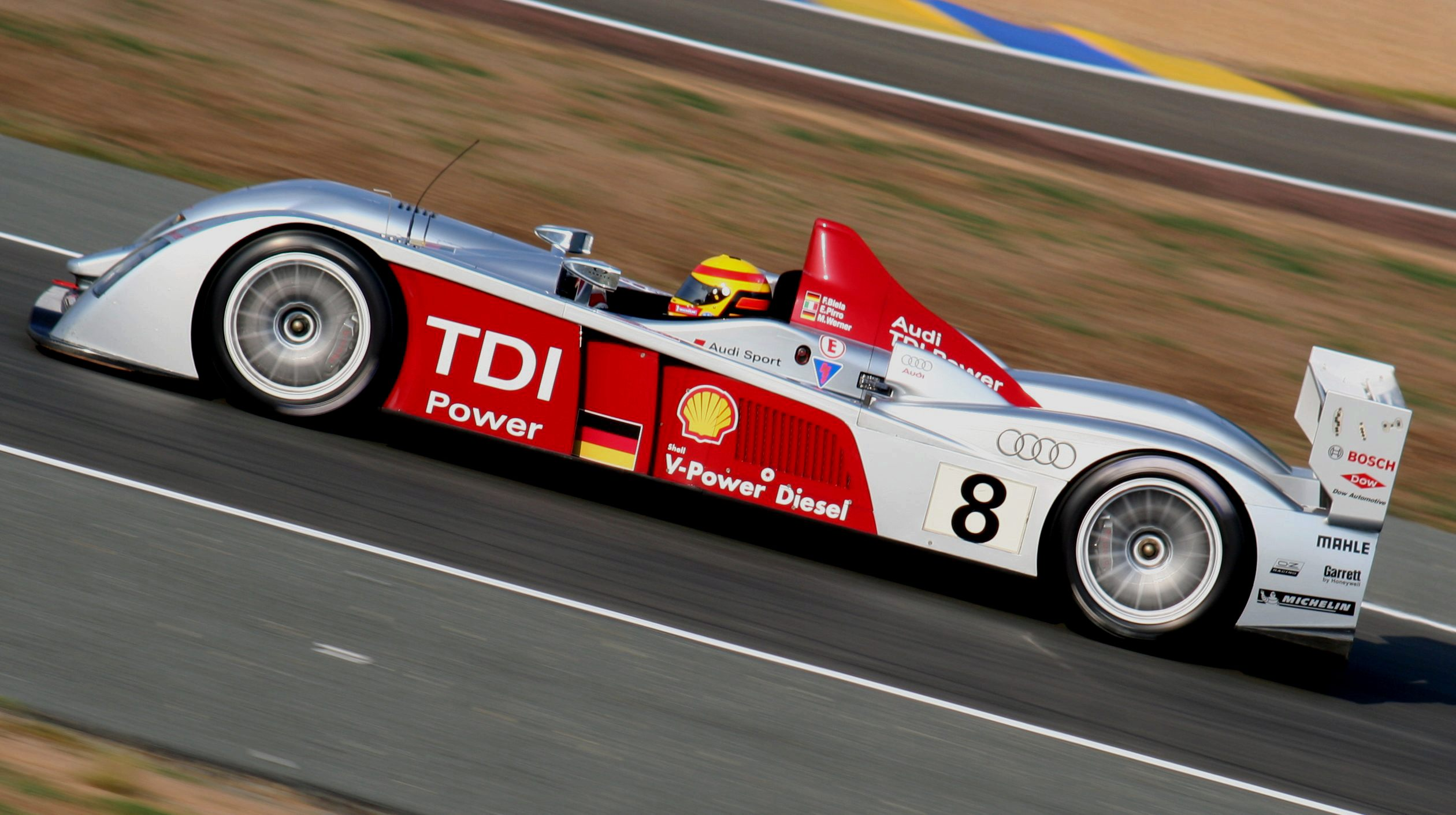
Biela driving an Audi R10 in the 2006 Le Mans 24 Hours.

In 1999, Biela abandoned touring cars in favour of joining the Audi R8 sports car project, racing under the Audi Sport Team Joest name. It was a good match, and Biela excelled in sportscar racing over the next few seasons, winning several classic events at the wheel of the R8 as well as three ALMS races. The highlight of Biela's time with the R8 team was three successive victories (2000–2002) in the 24 Hours of Le Mans alongside Emanuele Pirro and Tom Kristensen. Audi began to scale back support for the R8 programme after the 2002 season. After winning the ALMS series in 2003, Biela returned to the revamped German touring car series, driving an Audi for Joest Racing (the team which had run Biela's R8 for his three Le Mans wins); the season was not a success.

Biela continued to race an R8 at Le Mans each year with mixed results. In 2003, he missed the pit lane after just 15 laps and ran out of fuel. He finished 5th and 3rd in 2004 and 2005, respectively. In December 2005 he participated in the first runs of the new Audi R10 diesel sportscar, the R8's successor. Driving an R10 (again for Team Joest) in the 2006 24 Hours of Le Mans, alongside Pirro and new team-mate Marco Werner, Biela took his fourth victory to date in the classic race. He repeated the victory with the same car and team in 2007.

== Honors and awards ==
His greatest achievements include winning:

- 1991 Deutsche Tourenwagen Meisterschaft German Touring Car Championship with an Audi V8 (he has also finished 2nd and 3rd in DTM)
- 1993 French Touring Car Championship
- 1995 short-lived Touring Car World Cup one-off race
- 1996 British Touring Car Championship (finishing as runner-up the year after)
- 1996 Macau Grand Prix Guia Race
- 2000, 2003, 2004 and 2007 12 Hours of Sebring
- 2000, 2001, 2002, 2006 and 2007 24 Hours of Le Mans
- 2001 and 2005 Petit Le Mans
- 2003 American Le Mans Series LMP900 Drivers' Championship
- 2005 American Le Mans Series LMP1 Drivers' Championship
- In a 2005 poll conducted by Motorsport Magazine, Biela was voted 19th best touring car driver ever.

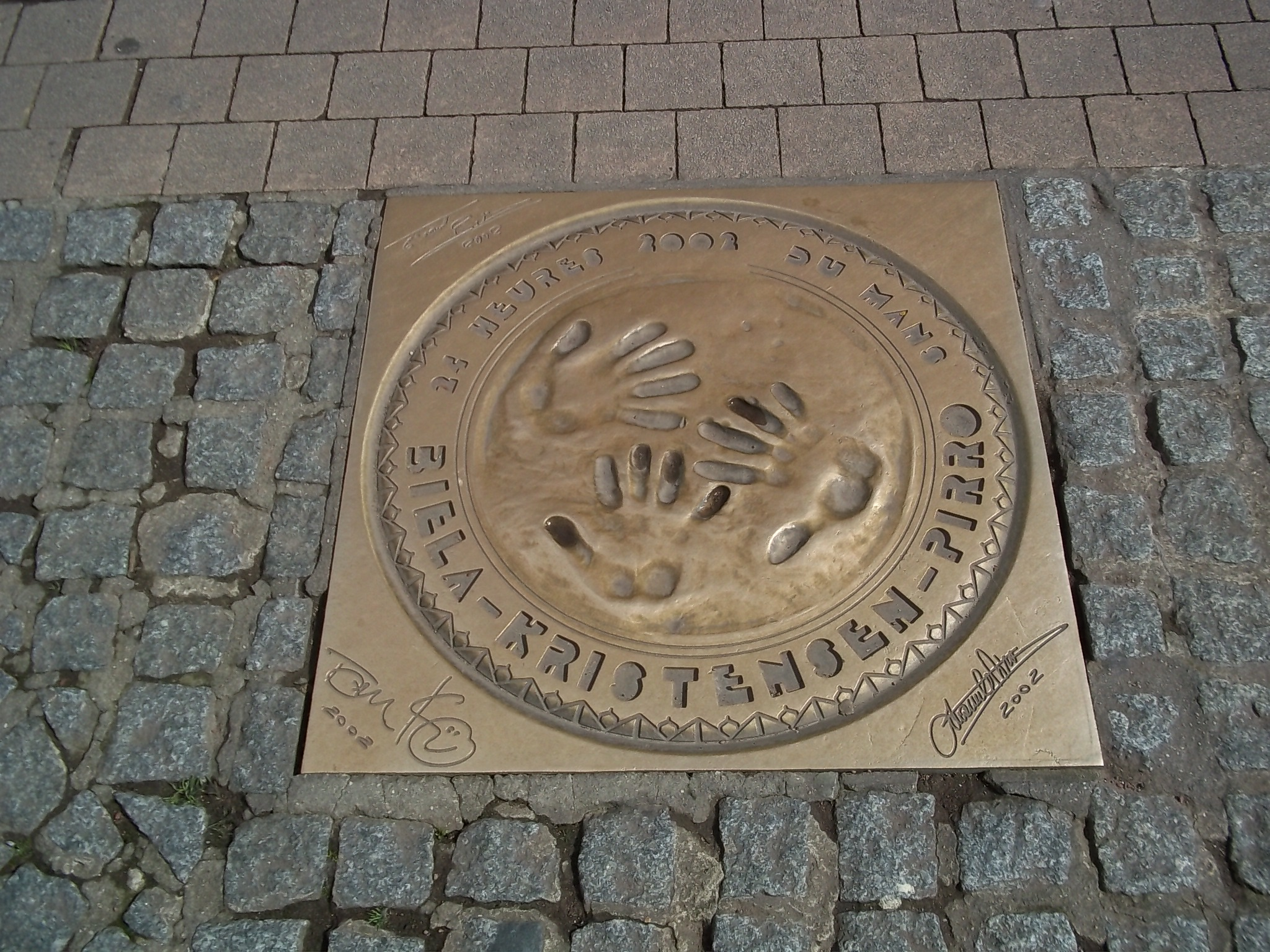
Frank Biela in the Walk of fame at Le Mans- Winners 2002

== Racing record ==
=== Complete Deutsche Tourenwagen Meisterschaft/Masters results ===
(key) (Races in bold indicate pole position) (Races in italics indicate fastest lap)

Year	Team	Car	1	2	3	4	5	6	7	8	9	10	11	12	13	14	15	16	17	18	19	20	21	22	23	24	Pos.	Pts
1987	Wolf Racing	Ford Sierra XR4 TI	HOC; 12	ZOL; 18	NÜR; 6	AVU; 1	MFA; 5	NOR; Ret	NÜR	WUN; DNS	DIE; 15	SAL															14th	59
1988	Team Hein Gericke Ford Grab Motorsport	Ford Sierra RS 500 Cosworth	ZOL; 1	ZOL; 2	HOC; 1	HOC; 2	NÜR; 1; 11	NÜR; 2; 7	BRN; 1; 10	BRN; 2; 4	AVU; 1	AVU; 2	MFA; 1 Ret	MFA; 2; 17	NÜR; 1; 7	NÜR; 2 Ret	NOR; 1	NOR; 2	WUN; 1; 3	WUN; 2; 3	SAL; 1	SAL; 2	HUN; 1; 12	HUN; 2; 7	HOC; 1; 13	HOC; 2; 9	16th	25
1989	Ford-Grab Motorsport GmbH	Ford Sierra RS 500 Cosworth	ZOL; 1; 19	ZOL; 2 Ret	HOC; 1; 13	HOC; 2; 10	NÜR; 1; 16	NÜR; 2 Ret	MFA; 1; 14	MFA; 2; 7	AVU; 1 Ret	AVU; 2; 16	NÜR; 1 Ret	NÜR; 2 DNS	NOR; 1; 14	NOR; 2; 10	HOC; 1; 7	HOC; 2; 2	DIE; 1; 10	DIE; 2; 6	NÜR; 1 Ret	NÜR; 2 Ret	HOC; 1; 2	HOC; 2; 6			13th	135
1990	MS-Jet-Racing	Mercedes 190E 2.5-16 Evo	ZOL; 1; 10	ZOL; 2; 5	HOC; 1; 11	HOC; 2 Ret	NÜR; 1; 7	NÜR; 2; 5	AVU; 1; 20	AVU; 2 Ret	MFA; 1; 3	MFA; 2; 3	WUN; 1; 11	WUN; 2; 9	NÜR; 1; 4	NÜR; 2; 1	NOR; 1; 16	NOR; 2; 9	DIE; 1; 10	DIE; 2; 15	NÜR; 1; 20	NÜR; 2 Ret	HOC; 1; 27	HOC; 2 DNS			10th	80
1991	Audi Zentrum Reutlingen	Audi V8 Quattro Evo	ZOL; 1; 15	ZOL; 2; 3	HOC; 1; 19	HOC; 2; 3	NÜR; 1; 6	NÜR; 2; 7	AVU; 1; 2	AVU; 2; 1	WUN; 1; 5	WUN; 2; 4	NOR; 1; 5	NOR; 2; 11	DIE; 1; 4	DIE; 2; 6	NÜR; 1; 8	NÜR; 2; 11	**ALE**; **1**; 1	**ALE**; **2** DSQ	**HOC**; **1**; 1	**HOC**; **2**; 1	BRN; 1; 11	BRN; 2; 7	**DON**; **1**; 1	**DON**; **2**; 1	1st	174
1992	Audi Zentrum Reutlingen	Audi V8 Quattro Evo	ZOL; 1; 3	ZOL; 2 Ret	NÜR; 1; 1	**NÜR**; **2**; 18	**WUN**; **1** DSQ	WUN; 2 DSQ	**AVU**; **1** Ret	AVU; 2; 8	HOC; 1; 21	HOC; 2; 14	NÜR; 1; 14	NÜR; 2; 15	NOR; 1	NOR; 2	BRN; 1	BRN; 2	DIE; 1	DIE; 2	ALE; 1	ALE; 2	NÜR; 1	NÜR; 2	HOC; 1	HOC; 2	15th	35
2004	Audi Sport Team Joest	Audi A4 DTM 2004	HOC; 16	EST; 15	ADR; Ret	LAU; 12	NOR; 11	SHA; 13^{‡}	NÜR; Ret	OSC; 13	ZAN; 9	BRN; 14	HOC; 11														17th	0
2007	Abt Sportsline	Audi A4 DTM 2007	HOC	OSC; 18†	LAU	BRH	NOR	MUG	ZAN	NÜR	CAT	HOC															23rd	0
Sources:

- † — Retired, but was classified as he completed 90% of the winner's race distance.
- ^{‡} A non-championship one-off race was held in 2004 at the streets of Shanghai, China.

=== Complete Italian Superturismo Championship results ===
(key) (Races in bold indicate pole position) (Races in italics indicate fastest lap)

Year	Team	Car	Class	1	2	3	4	5	6	7	8	9	10	11	12	13	14	15	16	17	18	19	20	DC	Pts
1994	Audi Sport Italia	Audi 80 Quattro		MNZ; 1	MNZ; 2	VAL; 1	VAL; 2	MAG; 1	MAG; 2	BIN; 1	BIN; 2	MIS; 1	MIS; 2	VAL; 1	VAL; 2	MUG; 1; 9	MUG; 2; 6	PER; 1; 10	PER; 2 DSQ	VAR; 1; 1	VAR; 2; 1	MUG; 1; 9	MUG; 2; 3	11th	57
1996	Audi Sport Italia	Audi A4 Quattro		MUG; 1	MUG; 2	MAG; 1	MAG; 2	MNZ; 1	MNZ; 2	BIN; 1	BIN; 2	MIS; 1	MIS; 2	IMO; 1	IMO; 2	PER; 1	PER; 2	PER; 1	PER; 2	VAR; 1; 4	VAR; 2 Ret	VAL; 1	VAL; 2	20th	10

=== Complete Super Tourenwagen Cup results ===
(key) (Races in bold indicate pole position) (Races in italics indicate fastest lap)

Year	Team	Car	1	2	3	4	5	6	7	8	9	10	11	12	13	14	15	16	17	18	19	20	Pos.	Pts
1994	ROC Competition	Audi 80 Quattro Competition	AVU; 1	WUN; 1	ZOL; 2	**ZAN**; 1	ÖST; 10	SAL; 15	SPA; 4	NÜR; 3													2nd	98
1995	ROC Competition	Audi A4 Quattro	ZOL; 1; 1	ZOL; 2; 1	SPA; 1; 3	SPA; 2 Ret	ÖST; 1; 2	ÖST; 2; 1	HOC; 1; 1	HOC; 2; 1	NÜR; 1; 3	NÜR; 2; 3	SAL; 1; 17	SAL; 2; 10	AVU; 1; 7	AVU; 2; 17	NÜR; 1 Ret	NÜR; 2; 5					3rd	391
1998	Abt Sportsline Team Audi	Audi A4	HOC; 1; 13	HOC; 2 Ret	NÜR; 1; 14	NÜR; 2; 12	SAC; 1 Ret	SAC; 2; 11	NOR; 1; 20	NOR; 2 Ret	REG; 1; 10	REG; 2; 5	WUN; 1; 8	WUN; 2 Ret	ZWE; 1; 13	ZWE; 2; 11	SAL; 1; 14	SAL; 2; 9	OSC; 1; 11	OSC; 2; 8	NÜR; 1; 6	NÜR; 2; 11	14th	242

=== Complete British Touring Car Championship results ===
(key) (Races in bold indicate pole position - 1 point awarded all races) (Races in italics indicate fastest lap)

Year	Team	Car	1	2	3	4	5	6	7	8	9	10	11	12	13	14	15	16	17	18	19	20	21	22	23	24	25	26	Pos	Pts
1996	Audi Sport UK	Audi A4 quattro	DON; 1; 1	**DON**; **2**; 1	BRH; 1; 1	BRH; 2; 4	**THR**; **1**; 1	THR; 2; 3	SIL; 1; 11	**SIL**; **2**; 1	**OUL**; **1**; 2	**OUL**; **2**; 2	SNE; 1; 2	SNE; 2 DSQ	BRH; 1; 2	BRH; 2; 8	SIL; 1; 3	SIL; 2; 2	KNO; 1; 1	KNO; 2; 2	OUL; 1; 2	**OUL**; **2**; 1	THR; 1; 2	THR; 2; 3	DON; 1; 4	DON; 2; 3	BRH; 1; 4	BRH; 2; 1	**1st**	**289**
1997	Audi Sport UK	Audi A4 quattro	DON; 1 Ret	DON; 2; 3	SIL; 1; 7	SIL; 2 Ret	THR; 1; 1	THR; 2 Ret	BRH; 1; 9	BRH; 2; 6	OUL; 1; 3	OUL; 2 Ret	DON; 1; 1	DON; 2; 3	CRO; 1; 4	CRO; 2; 17	KNO; 1; 2	**KNO**; **2**; 1	SNE; 1; 3	SNE; 2; 9	THR; 1; 2	THR; 2; 1	**BRH**; **1**; 1	BRH; 2; 5	SIL; 1; 8	SIL; 2; 15			**2nd**	**171**

=== Complete 24 Hours of Le Mans results ===
Year	Team	Co-Drivers	Car	Class	Laps	Pos.	Class Pos.
1999	(Germany) Audi Sport Team Joest	(Belgium) Didier Theys (Italy) Emanuele Pirro	Audi R8R	LMP	360	**3rd**	**3rd**
2000	(Germany) Audi Sport Team Joest	(Denmark) Tom Kristensen (Italy) Emanuele Pirro	Audi R8	LMP900	368	**1st**	**1st**
2001	(Germany) Audi Sport Team Joest	(Denmark) Tom Kristensen (Italy) Emanuele Pirro	Audi R8	LMP900	321	**1st**	**1st**
2002	(Germany) Audi Sport Team Joest	(Denmark) Tom Kristensen (Italy) Emanuele Pirro	Audi R8	LMP900	375	**1st**	**1st**
2003	(United Kingdom) Audi Sport UK (United Kingdom) Arena Motorsport	(United Kingdom) Perry McCarthy (Finland) Mika Salo	Audi R8	LMP900	28	DNF	DNF
2004	(United Kingdom) Audi Sport UK Team Veloqx	(United Kingdom) Allan McNish (Germany) Pierre Kaffer	Audi R8	LMP1	350	5th	5th
2005	(United States) ADT Champion Racing	(United Kingdom) Allan McNish (Italy) Emanuele Pirro	Audi R8	LMP1	364	**3rd**	**3rd**
2006	(Germany) Audi Sport Team Joest	(Germany) Marco Werner (Italy) Emanuele Pirro	Audi R10 TDI	LMP1	380	**1st**	**1st**
2007	(Germany) Audi Sport North America	(Germany) Marco Werner (Italy) Emanuele Pirro	Audi R10 TDI	LMP1	369	**1st**	**1st**
2008	(Germany) Audi Sport North America	(Germany) Marco Werner (Italy) Emanuele Pirro	Audi R10 TDI	LMP1	367	6th	6th

=== Complete 12 Hours of Sebring results ===
Year	Team	Co-Drivers	Car	Class	Laps	Pos.	Class Pos.
1999	(Germany) Audi Sport Team Joest	(United Kingdom) Perry McCarthy (Italy) Emanuele Pirro	Audi R8R	LMP	304	5th	5th
2000	(Germany) Audi Sport North America	(Italy) Emanuele Pirro (Denmark) Tom Kristensen	Audi R8	LMP	360	**1st**	**1st**
2001	(Germany) Audi Sport North America	(Italy) Emanuele Pirro (Denmark) Tom Kristensen	Audi R8	LMP900	370	**2nd**	**2nd**
2002	(Germany) Audi Sport North America	(Italy) Emanuele Pirro (Denmark) Tom Kristensen	Audi R8	LMP900	327	5th	5th
2003	(Germany) Infineon Team Joest	(Germany) Marco Werner (Austria) Philipp Peter	Audi R8	LMP900	367	**1st**	**1st**
2004	(United Kingdom) Audi Sport UK Team Veloqx	(United Kingdom) Allan McNish (Germany) Pierre Kaffer	Audi R8	LMP1	350	**1st**	**1st**
2005	(United States) ADT Champion Racing	(Italy) Emanuele Pirro (United Kingdom) Allan McNish	Audi R8	LMP1	361	**2nd**	**2nd**
2006	(United States) Audi Sport North America	(Germany) Marco Werner (Italy) Emanuele Pirro	Audi R10 TDI	LMP1	117	DNF	DNF
2007	(United States) Audi Sport North America	(Germany) Marco Werner (Italy) Emanuele Pirro	Audi R10 TDI	LMP1	364	**1st**	**1st**

=== Complete Porsche Supercup results ===
(key) (Races in bold indicate pole position) (Races in italics indicate fastest lap)

Year	Team	1	2	3	4	5	6	7	8	9	10	11	DC	Points	Ref
2007	Porsche AG	BHR	BHR	ESP	MON	FRA	GBR	GER; 18	HUN	TUR	BEL	ITA	NC‡	0‡	

‡ Not eligible for points due to being a guest driver.

=== Complete Bathurst 1000 results ===
Year	Team	Co-Drivers	Car	Class	Laps	Pos.	Class Pos.	Ref
1989	(Australia) Allan Moffat Enterprises	(West Germany) Klaus Niedzwiedz	Ford Sierra RS500	A	161	2nd	2nd	
1990	(Australia) Allan Moffat Enterprises	(West Germany) Klaus Niedzwiedz (Belgium) Pierre Dieudonné	Ford Sierra RS500	1	151	10th	10th	
1997*	ORIX Audi Sport Australia	(Australia) Brad Jones	Audi A4 Quattro		161	2nd	2nd	

* Super Touring race

== Notes and references ==
=== References ===
Awards and achievements
Preceded by John Cleland	Autosport; National Racing Driver of the Year; 1996	Succeeded by Alain Menu
Sporting positions
Preceded by Hans-Joachim Stuck	German Touring Car Champion; 1991	Succeeded by Klaus Ludwig
Preceded by Marc Sourd	French Touring Car Champion; 1993	Succeeded by Laurent Aïello
Preceded by Paul Radisich	Winner of the FIA World Touring Car Cup; 1995	Succeeded by none
Preceded by John Cleland	British Touring Car Champion; 1996	Succeeded by Alain Menu
Preceded by Kelvin Burt	Guia Race winner 1996	Succeeded by Steve Soper
Preceded by Pierluigi Martini; Yannick Dalmas; Joachim Winkelhock	Winner of the 24 Hours of Le Mans; 2000 with: Tom Kristensen; Emanuele Pirro	Succeeded by Frank Biela; Tom Kristensen; Emanuele Pirro
Preceded by Frank Biela; Tom Kristensen; Emanuele Pirro	Winner of the 24 Hours of Le Mans; 2001 with: Tom Kristensen; Emanuele Pirro	Succeeded by Frank Biela; Tom Kristensen; Emanuele Pirro
Preceded by Frank Biela; Tom Kristensen; Emanuele Pirro	Winner of the 24 Hours of Le Mans; 2002 with: Tom Kristensen; Emanuele Pirro	Succeeded by Tom Kristensen; Rinaldo Capello; Guy Smith
Preceded by Tom Kristensen	American Le Mans Series champion 2003 with Marco Werner	Succeeded by Marco Werner; J.J. Lehto
Preceded by Marco Werner; J.J. Lehto	American Le Mans Series champion 2005 with Emanuele Pirro	Succeeded by Allan McNish; Rinaldo Capello
Preceded by J.J. Lehto; Marco Werner; Tom Kristensen	Winner of the 24 Hours of Le Mans; 2006 with: Emanuele Pirro; Marco Werner	Succeeded by Frank Biela; Emanuele Pirro; Marco Werner
Preceded by Frank Biela; Emanuele Pirro; Marco Werner	Winner of the 24 Hours of Le Mans; 2007 with: Emanuele Pirro; Marco Werner	Succeeded by Allan McNish; Rinaldo Capello; Tom Kristensen
