= Petit Le Mans =

Sports car endurance race in Georgia, US

IMSA WeatherTech SportsCar Championship
- Venue: Road Atlanta
- Corporate sponsor: Motul
- First race: 1998
- First USCC race: 2014
- Laps: 394
- Duration: 1998–2013: 1,000 miles (1,600 km) or 10 hours (Note: From 1998 to 2013, the race was held for whichever of the two durations came first.); 2014–present: 10 hours
- Most wins (driver): Rinaldo Capello (5)
- Most wins (team): Audi Sport North America (6)
- Most wins (manufacturer): Audi (9)

Petit Le Mans (French for Little Le Mans) is a sports car endurance race held annually at Road Atlanta in Braselton, Georgia, United States. The race has been held for a duration of 10 hours since 2014, having previously been held for either 1,000 miles (1,600 km) or 10 hours, whichever came first. In addition to the overall race, teams compete for class victories in different categories, divided into prototypes and grand tourers.

The race was founded by Road Atlanta owner Don Panoz to bring the rules and spirit of the 24 Hours of Le Mans to North America. The success of the inaugural event in 1998, held as part of the IMSA season with a special one-off format, led to the creation of the American Le Mans Series in 1999 with a similar formula. Petit Le Mans was a flagship event for the ALMS, which became the most prominent top-class sports car racing series during the 2000s. The 2010 and 2011 editions were also part of the Intercontinental Le Mans Cup, the precursor of the World Endurance Championship. Since 2014 the race has been one of the crown jewel events of the IMSA SportsCar Championship. Class winners of the event originally received an automatic invitation to the following year's 24 Hours of Le Mans, however this was removed in 2012.

The race is considered one of the most important endurance races in the world and is one of the largest such events in North America, along with the 24 Hours of Daytona and the 12 Hours of Sebring. Rinaldo Capello holds the record of most race wins, having won in 2000, 2002, 2006, 2007 and 2008.

== History ==
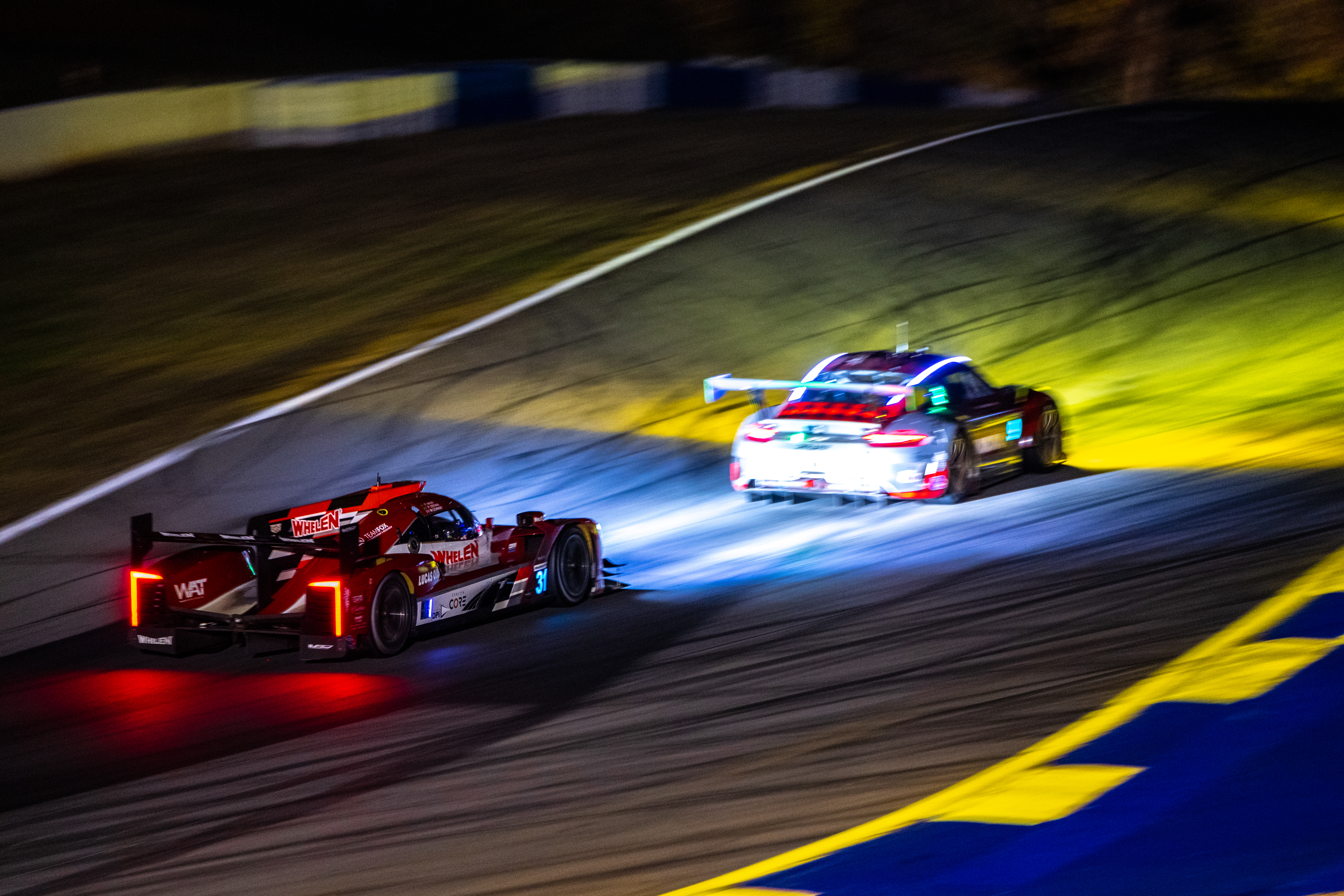
A Cadillac DPi-V.R and Porsche 911 GT3 R competing at the 2021 race

Following the demise of the World Sportscar Championship in 1992, sports car racing was left without a major worldwide series in which to compete. The 24 Hours of Le Mans remained a remnant, still competed by a large number of sports cars, but mostly on a single race basis. Various sports car leagues had sprung up since the WSC's demise without major success, including the International Motor Sports Association (IMSA)'s replacement for their GTP series, the Professional SportsCar Racing series. In Europe, two series were also developed, the FIA Sportscar Championship and the FIA GT Championship, although they were not combined like IMSA's series.

Don Panoz, owner of the Road Atlanta racing course, collaborated with the organizers of the 24 Hours of Le Mans, the Automobile Club de l'Ouest (ACO), to form a new sports car endurance race at the track for 1998, called Petit Le Mans (French for little Le Mans). The event would adopt the ACO's rules, and in addition to agreeing to lend the Le Mans name out to Panoz, the ACO offered class winners automatic invitations to the following year's 24 Hours of Le Mans. The race would be similar to the 12 Hours of Sebring, in that it did not run a full 24 hours like Le Mans. Instead, the race would be 10 hours or 1,000 miles (1,600 km), whichever came first. IMSA agreed to let the race be the season finale of their series with a special one-off format, featuring competitors from Le Mans. However, IMSA and Le Mans ran slightly different formulas for their competitors, thus forcing the organizers to create seven different classes: LMP1, LMGT1, and LMGT2 for the ACO-compliant cars, and WSC, GT1, GT2, and GT3 for IMSA's competitors. Even though both organizers used the GT1 and GT2 names the classes were not actually the same, which is why the ACO classes are preceded by LM.

If Petit Le Mans proved to be successful, the ACO would look into developing a series around the same formula. The inaugural event in 1998 attracted 31 entries, including that year's 24 Hours of Le Mans-winning Porsche factory team. A satisfactory number of spectators attended the event, while overall honors for the race were contested between the factory Porsche 911 GT1-98 and LMP1-98 cars as well as multiple Ferrari 333 SPs and Panoz Esperante GTR-1s. Before the race had finished, an agreement was made for Panoz to establish the American Le Mans Series in 1999 with the support of the ACO, replacing the IMSA GT Championship.

The 2009 and 2015 races were shortened due to heavy rains making the track impassable. The 2015 race featured the first time a GT car won overall against the faster prototypes. Rain from Hurricane Joaquin created a flooded track the entire race causing multiple cautions and a red flag, allowing GTLM cars to leap-frog the prototypes that were struggling for grip in the conditions. Nick Tandy, winner of the 2015 24 Hours of Le Mans, and co-driver Patrick Pilet took the checkered flag when officials called the race with a little over two hours remaining.

== Race specifics ==
Petit Le Mans is held annually at Road Atlanta, a 2.54-mile (4.09 km) permanent road course located in Braselton, Georgia, United States. The circuit features twelve turns and includes significant elevation changes and high-speed sections, with some describing it as a "roller coaster". Notable areas include the downhill "Esses" and the final corner leading onto the main straight. The race has been run for a duration of 10 hours since 2014, prior to which it was run for either 1,000 miles or 10 hours, whichever came first. Teams are required to use multiple drivers, usually three per entry, with driver stints regulated by IMSA rules. The race is contested with multiple car classes—typically split into prototype and GT categories—sharing the circuit simultaneously.

The event is one of the Endurance Cup rounds in the IMSA SportsCar Championship and is considered one of the three crown jewel events in the series, along with the 24 Hours of Daytona and 12 Hours of Sebring. It traditionally serves as the season-ending round of the championship, and championship titles are frequently decided during the event. Teams may take differing approaches to the race because of this, with some willing to take more risks to claim a major win to end the season, while others may take a more cautious approach to secure championship titles. The race usually starts at around 12 p.m. local time on Saturday and ends at 10 p.m. in the evening, with the final two hours of the race taking place at night. The relatively short and tight nature of the track along with a number of blind corners requires drivers to manage traffic carefully to avoid incidents and minimize time losses. Typically held in early October, weather is a variable factor with rain being fairly common.

Petit Le Mans occupies a significant place on the international endurance racing calendar. It has been regarded as one of the "Big Six" endurance motor races worldwide, alongside the 24-hour races at Le Mans, Daytona, Nürburgring and Spa, as well as the Sebring 12 Hours. The race attracts manufacturer-backed professional teams and internationally recognized drivers, with several 24 Hours of Le Mans, Indianapolis 500 and Formula One winners having competed at the event. Manufacturers have participated in the event with innovative technologies and designs, including alternative powertrains and fuel technologies. Notably, Panoz's participation in the 1998 race with the Q9 GTR-1 Hybrid marked the first time in motorsport history that hybrid technology had been used to record a race start, finish, and class win. Other experimental vehicles that have participated in the race include the Porsche 911 GT3 R Hybrid and the DeltaWing, which made their North American debuts in the 2010 and 2012 races, respectively.

== Overall winners ==
Year	Drivers	Team	Chassis-Engine	Championship(s)
1998	(Belgium) Eric van de Poele (South Africa) Wayne Taylor (France) Emmanuel Collard	(United States) Doyle-Risi Racing	Ferrari 333 SP	Professional SportsCar Racing Championship
1999	(Australia) David Brabham (France) Éric Bernard (United Kingdom) Andy Wallace	(United States) Panoz Motor Sports	Panoz LMP-1 Roadster-S-Ford	American Le Mans Series
2000	(United Kingdom) Allan McNish (Italy) Rinaldo Capello (Italy) Michele Alboreto	(Germany) Audi Sport North America	Audi R8	American Le Mans Series
2001	(Germany) Frank Biela (Italy) Emanuele Pirro	(Germany) Audi Sport North America	Audi R8	American Le Mans Series; European Le Mans Series
2002	(Denmark) Tom Kristensen (Italy) Rinaldo Capello	(Germany) Audi Sport North America	Audi R8	American Le Mans Series
2003	(Finland) JJ Lehto (United Kingdom) Johnny Herbert	(United States) ADT Champion Racing	Audi R8	American Le Mans Series
2004	(Germany) Marco Werner (Finland) JJ Lehto	(United States) ADT Champion Racing	Audi R8	American Le Mans Series
2005	(Germany) Frank Biela (Italy) Emanuele Pirro	(United States) ADT Champion Racing	Audi R8	American Le Mans Series
2006	(Italy) Rinaldo Capello (United Kingdom) Allan McNish	(United States) Audi Sport North America	Audi R10 TDI	American Le Mans Series
2007	(United Kingdom) Allan McNish (Italy) Rinaldo Capello	(United States) Audi Sport North America	Audi R10 TDI	American Le Mans Series
2008	(United Kingdom) Allan McNish (Italy) Rinaldo Capello (Italy) Emanuele Pirro	(United States) Audi Sport North America	Audi R10 TDI	American Le Mans Series
2009	(France) Franck Montagny (France) Stéphane Sarrazin	(France) Team Peugeot Total	Peugeot 908 HDi FAP	American Le Mans Series
2010	(France) Franck Montagny (France) Stéphane Sarrazin (Portugal) Pedro Lamy	(France) Team Peugeot Total	Peugeot 908 HDi FAP	American Le Mans Series; Intercontinental Le Mans Cup
2011	(France) Franck Montagny (France) Stéphane Sarrazin (Austria) Alexander Wurz	(France) Peugeot Sport Total	Peugeot 908	American Le Mans Series; Intercontinental Le Mans Cup
2012	(Switzerland) Neel Jani (France) Nicolas Prost (Italy) Andrea Belicchi	(Switzerland) Rebellion Racing	Lola B12/60-Toyota	American Le Mans Series; European Le Mans Series
2013	(Switzerland) Neel Jani (France) Nicolas Prost (Germany) Nick Heidfeld	(Switzerland) Rebellion Racing	Lola B12/60-Toyota	American Le Mans Series
2014	(United States) Jordan Taylor (United States) Ricky Taylor (Italy) Max Angelelli	(United States) Wayne Taylor Racing	Chevrolet Corvette DP	United SportsCar Championship
2015	(United Kingdom) Nick Tandy (France) Patrick Pilet (Austria) Richard Lietz	(Germany) Porsche North America	Porsche 911 RSR	United SportsCar Championship
2016	(United States) John Pew (Brazil) Oswaldo Negri Jr. (France) Olivier Pla	(United States) Michael Shank Racing	Ligier JS P2-Honda	IMSA SportsCar Championship
2017	(United Kingdom) Ryan Dalziel (New Zealand) Brendon Hartley (United States) Scott Sharp	(United States) Tequila Patron ESM	Nissan Onroak DPi	IMSA SportsCar Championship
2018	(United States) Ryan Hunter-Reay (United States) Jordan Taylor (Netherlands) Renger van der Zande	(United States) Wayne Taylor Racing	Cadillac DPi-V.R	IMSA SportsCar Championship
2019	(Brazil) Felipe Nasr (Brazil) Pipo Derani (United States) Eric Curran	(United States) Whelen Engineering Racing	Cadillac DPi-V.R	IMSA SportsCar Championship
2020	(Australia) Ryan Briscoe (New Zealand) Scott Dixon (Netherlands) Renger van der Zande	(United States) Konica Minolta Cadillac	Cadillac DPi-V.R	IMSA SportsCar Championship
2021	(United States) Jonathan Bomarito (United Kingdom) Oliver Jarvis (United Kingdom) Harry Tincknell	(Canada) Mazda Motorsports	Mazda RT24-P	IMSA SportsCar Championship
2022	(United Kingdom) Tom Blomqvist (Brazil) Hélio Castroneves (United Kingdom) Oliver Jarvis	(United States) Meyer Shank Racing w/ Curb-Agajanian	Acura ARX-05	IMSA SportsCar Championship
2023	(United Kingdom) Tom Blomqvist (Brazil) Hélio Castroneves (United States) Colin Braun	(United States) Meyer Shank Racing w/ Curb-Agajanian	Acura ARX-06	IMSA SportsCar Championship
2024	(France) Sébastien Bourdais (New Zealand) Scott Dixon (Netherlands) Renger van der Zande	(United States) Cadillac Racing	Cadillac V-Series.R	IMSA SportsCar Championship
2025	(United Kingdom) Jack Aitken (New Zealand) Earl Bamber (Denmark) Frederik Vesti	(United States) Cadillac Whelen	Cadillac V-Series.R	IMSA SportsCar Championship
2026	(Belgium) Laurens Vanthoor (France) Kevin Estre (Australia) Matt Campbell	(United States) Porsche Penske Motorsport	Porsche 963	IMSA SportsCar Championship

== Statistics ==
=== Multiple wins by driver ===
Rank	Driver	Wins	Years
1	(Italy) Rinaldo Capello	5	2000, 2002, 2006–2008
2	(United Kingdom) Allan McNish	4	2000, 2006–2008
3	(Italy) Emanuele Pirro	3	2001, 2005, 2008
3	(France) Franck Montagny	3	2009–2011
3	(France) Stéphane Sarrazin	3	2009–2011
3	(Netherlands) Renger van der Zande	3	2018, 2020, 2024
7	(Finland) JJ Lehto	2	2003–2004
7	(Germany) Frank Biela	2	2001, 2005
7	(Switzerland) Neel Jani	2	2012–2013
7	(France) Nicolas Prost	2	2012–2013
7	(United States) Jordan Taylor	2	2014, 2018
7	(United Kingdom) Oliver Jarvis	2	2021–2022
7	(United Kingdom) Tom Blomqvist	2	2022–2023
7	(Brazil) Hélio Castroneves	2	2022–2023
7	(New Zealand) Scott Dixon	2	2020, 2024

=== Wins by manufacturer ===
Rank	Manufacturer	Wins	Years
1	(Germany) Audi	9	2000–2008
2	(United States) Cadillac	5	2018–2020, 2024–2025
3	(France) Peugeot	3	2009–2011
4	(United Kingdom) Lola	2	2012–2013
4	(Japan) Acura	2	2022–2023
4	(Germany) Porsche	2	2015, 2026
7	(Italy) Ferrari	1	1998
7	(United States) Panoz	1	1999
7	(United States) Chevrolet	1	2014
7	(Japan) Honda	1	2016
7	(Japan) Nissan	1	2017
7	(Japan) Mazda	1	2021

=== Multiple wins by team ===
Rank	Maker	Wins	Years
1	(France) Peugeot Sport Total	3	2009–2011
1	(Germany) Audi Sport North America	3	2000–2002
1	(United States) Audi Sport North America	3	2006–2008
1	(United States) ADT Champion Racing	3	2003–2005
1	(United States) Wayne Taylor Racing	3	2014, 2018, 2020
1	(United States) Meyer Shank Racing	3	2016, 2022–2023
7	(Switzerland) Rebellion Racing	2	2012–2013
7	(United States) Whelen Engineering Racing	2	2019, 2025

== See also ==
- Grand Prix of Atlanta
