= Audi R8 (LMP) =

Le Mans Prototype race car

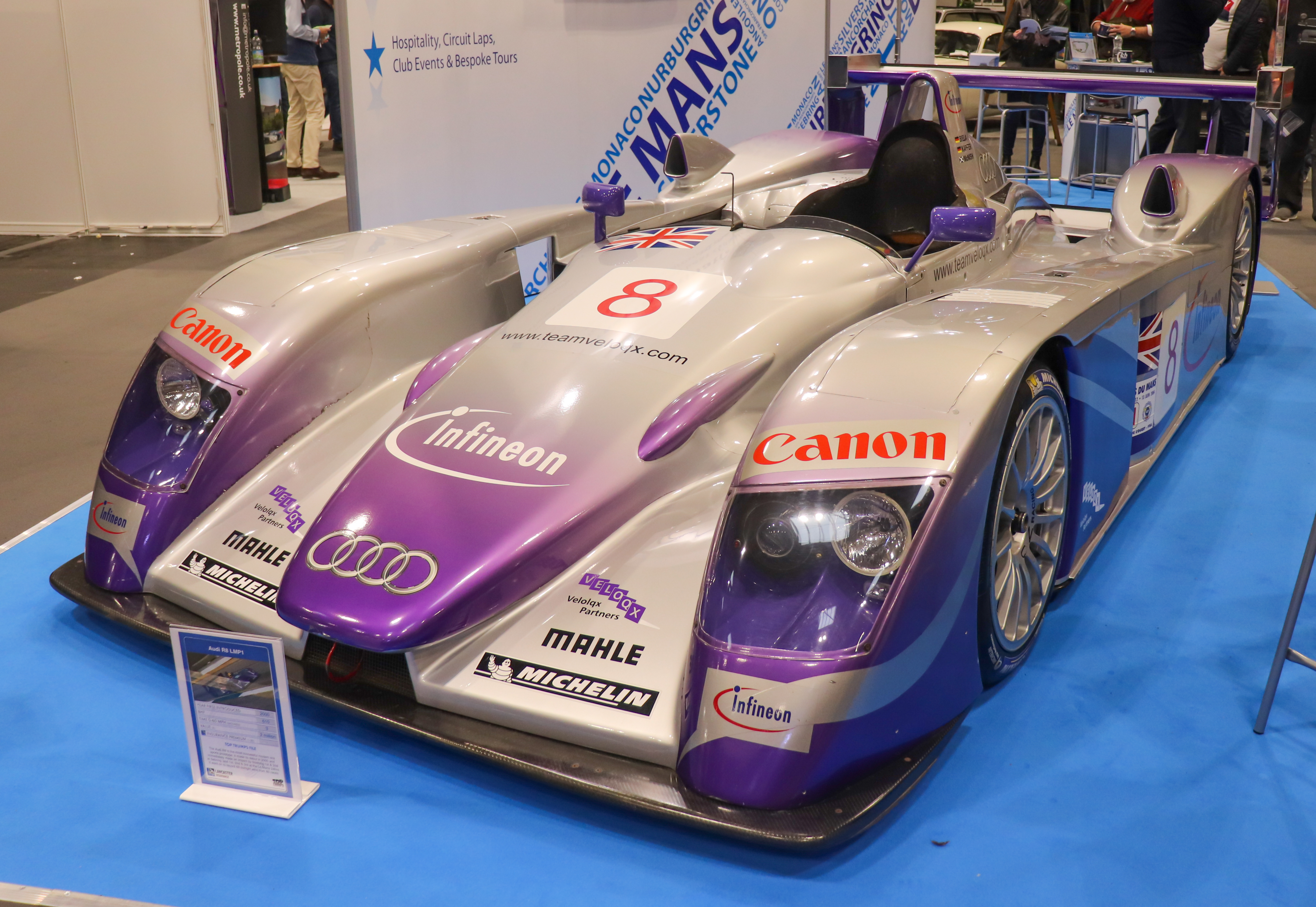
- Category: Le Mans Prototype
- Constructor: Audi (Dallara)
- Designers: Michael Pfadenhauer (aerodynamics); Wolfgang Appel (chassis); Ulrich Baretzky (engine)
- Predecessor: Audi R8R
- Successor: Audi R10 TDI

Technical specifications
- Chassis: Carbon fiber and aluminum honeycomb monocoque
- Suspension (front): Independent double wishbone pushrod system with horizontal spring/damper unit, adjustable gas-filled shock absorbers
- Suspension (rear): Independent double wishbone pushrod system with horizontal spring/damper unit, adjustable gas-filled shock absorbers
- Engine: Audi 3.6 liter 90-degree V8 twin-turbo, mid-engine, longitudinally mounted
- Transmission: Ricardo 6-speed electro-pneumatic actuated sequential manual Multiple-disc limited-slip differential
- Fuel: Shell
- Tyres: Michelin

Competition history
- Notable entrants: (Germany) Audi Sport Team Joest (United Kingdom) Audi Sport UK (United Kingdom) Audi Sport UK Team Veloqx; Audi Sport Japan Team Goh (United States) Champion Racing (United Kingdom) Johansson Motorsport (France) Audi PlayStation Team Oreca
- Notable drivers: (Denmark) Tom Kristensen (Germany) Marco Werner (Italy) Rinaldo Capello (Italy) Michele Alboreto (United Kingdom) Allan McNish (Italy) Emanuele Pirro (Germany) Frank Biela (France) Laurent Aïello (Monaco) Stéphane Ortelli (Sweden) Stefan Johansson (Finland) JJ Lehto (United Kingdom) Johnny Herbert
- Debut: 2000 12 Hours of Sebring
Races	Wins	Poles
79	63	47

2000 Audi R8
Audi R8 at Goodwood Festival of Speed 2009

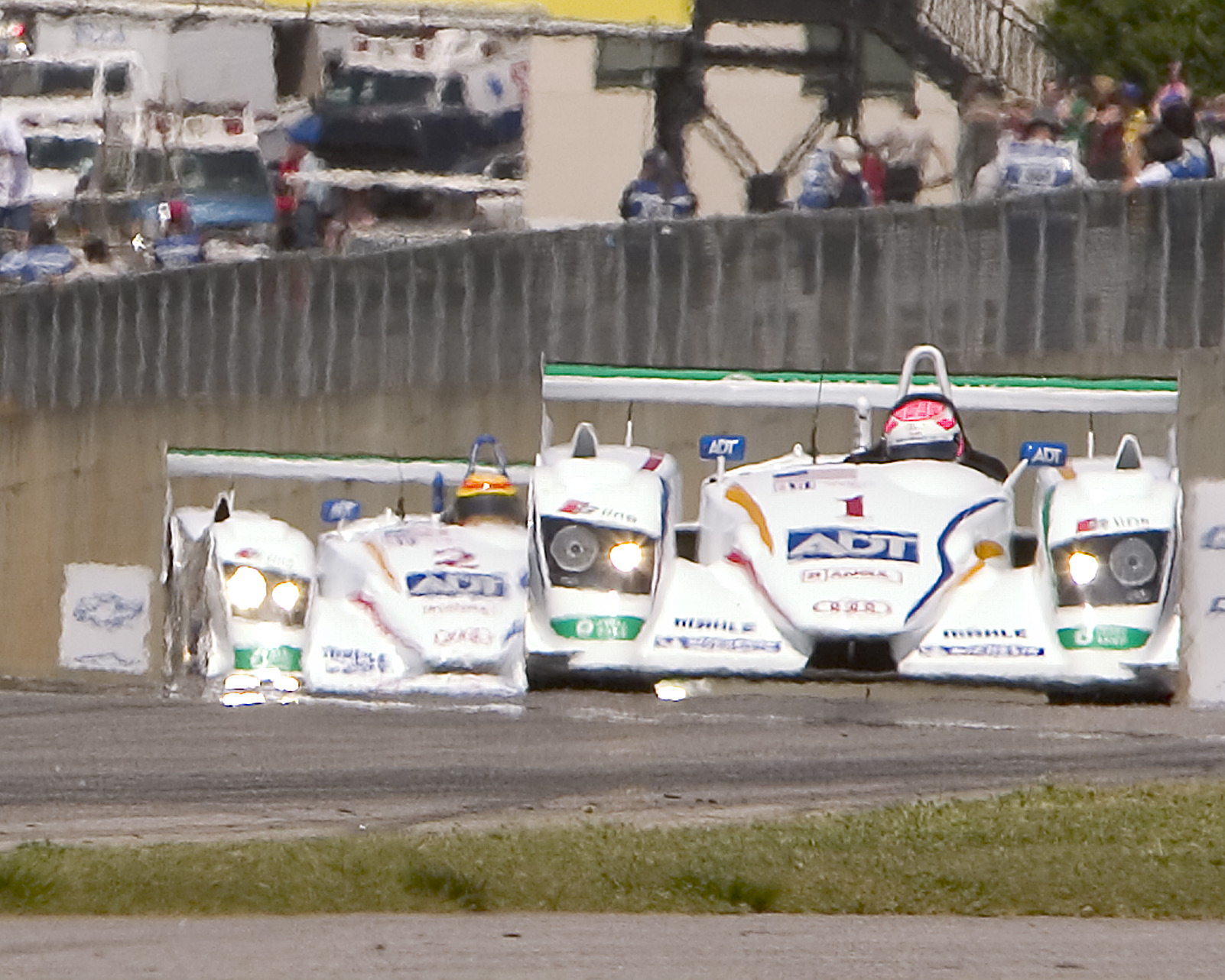
The #1 & #2 Audi R8 LMP1 cars racing in the 2005 Grand Prix of Atlanta

The Audi R8 is a Le Mans Prototype sports-prototype race car introduced in 2000 for sports car racing as a redevelopment of their Audi R8R (open-top LMP) and Audi R8C (closed-top LMGTP) used in 1999. In its class, it is one of the most successful racing sports cars having won the 24 Hours of Le Mans race in 2000, 2001, 2002, 2004, and 2005, five of the six years it competed in total. Its streak of Le Mans victories between 2000 and 2005 was broken only in 2003 by the Bentley Speed 8, another race car fielded that year by Volkswagen Group.

The petrol-powered Audi R8 race car was in 2006 replaced by the new Audi R10 TDI Diesel; however, the need to further develop the R10 meant that the R8 saw action in a few races leading up to the 24 Hours of Le Mans.

A total of 16 chassis were built.

== History ==
=== 1998: The challenge ===
In 1997, sports car racing and especially the Le Mans 24 Hours was popular among factories such as BMW, Mercedes-Benz, Porsche, Toyota, Nissan Motors, and others. At that time, Audi Sport boss Wolfgang Ullrich started to evaluate the options of joining.

With the upcoming American Le Mans Series also providing a stage for the US market, Audi announced plans in 1998 to compete in 1999, with the Audi R8R powered by a 550 hp (410 kW) V8 turbo. As it was considered the better choice for a whole race due to less weight and wider tires, Audi ordered an open-top roadster from Dallara to be developed and run by Joest Racing.

Yet, during the autumn of 1998, after the necessity of GT1 homologation was dropped in favour of LM-GTP prototypes, closed GT coupés like the Porsche 911 GT1, Mercedes-Benz CLK-GTR, and the Toyota GT-One proved successful. In response, Audi also ordered their newly acquired Norfolk-based Racing Technology Norfolk, led by Tony Southgate, to build a closed-cockpit car using the same drivetrain.

The ACO rules for closed-top prototypes allowed cars to run with larger air restrictors, resulting in more power (about 600 hp), which resulted in a higher top speed in combination with the lower drag. To compensate this advantage over the duration of a race, the LMGTPs were limited to smaller tyres and smaller fuel tanks.

=== 1999: The R8R and R8C ===
Following a period of testing, two R8Rs debuted at the 1999 12 Hours of Sebring. The hich was a strong sign towards the race in France. The already tested open-top Audi R8R, entered by Joest Racing, was not fast enough to challenge for a win, finishing third.

After further tests and modifications, the Audis returned for Le Mans. The new debuting R8Cs lacked pace and unfortunately suffered mechanical gearbox woes. Lap times were 10 seconds down from the leading LMP and LMGTP competitors. Joest's R8Rs ran steady, yet still were too slow to run for pole position. After a race that had the spectacular flights of the Mercedes-Benz CLR and leading cars of Toyota and BMW crashing out, the Audi R8Rs took third and fourth behind the surviving #15 BMW V12 LMR and the Japanese-driven Toyota.

Based on the experiences, Audi decided to regroup for 2000, and built a new R8 spyder together with Joest and Dallara. The British-built R8C coupe was retired, but Audi-owned Bentley developed the concept of the R8C closed-cockpit LMGTP and entered the Bentley EXP Speed 8 in 2001, winning the race with the Bentley Speed 8 in 2003.

=== 1999: Retiring competitors ===
After the 1999 Le Mans shame, Mercedes retired from GTs to focus on the return of the DTM touring cars in 2000, as well as on F1. Toyota and BMW also went to F1, with BMW at least continuing to race for two years in the ALMS, where the open roadster of Bill Auberlen also suffered a "back flip" during the Petit Le Mans at Road Atlanta in 2000, as the closed-cockpit Porsche of Yannick Dalmas had done in 1998. Despite the BMW V12 LMR not receiving further development, the German team Schnitzer Motorsport was almost as effective as Joest. Still, the BMW V12 LMR could not match the Audi R8's might in the championship and lost almost every race against it. BMW quit the top class to race the BMW M3 in the GT class since, dominating in the ALMS and in WTCC, as well as at the 24 Hours Nürburgring.

This left only Porsche as a major possible challenger for 2000; however, the Porsche LMP project was scrapped before it had a chance to race. Rumours at that time said that Ferdinand Piech himself made them stay away, using his influence as a co-owner of Porsche, as well as his management role at Volkswagen, which would develop the upcoming SUV VW Touareg in cooperation with the Porsche Cayenne. The Porsche V10 racer was turned into the Porsche Carrera GT instead.

=== 2000: The R8 ===
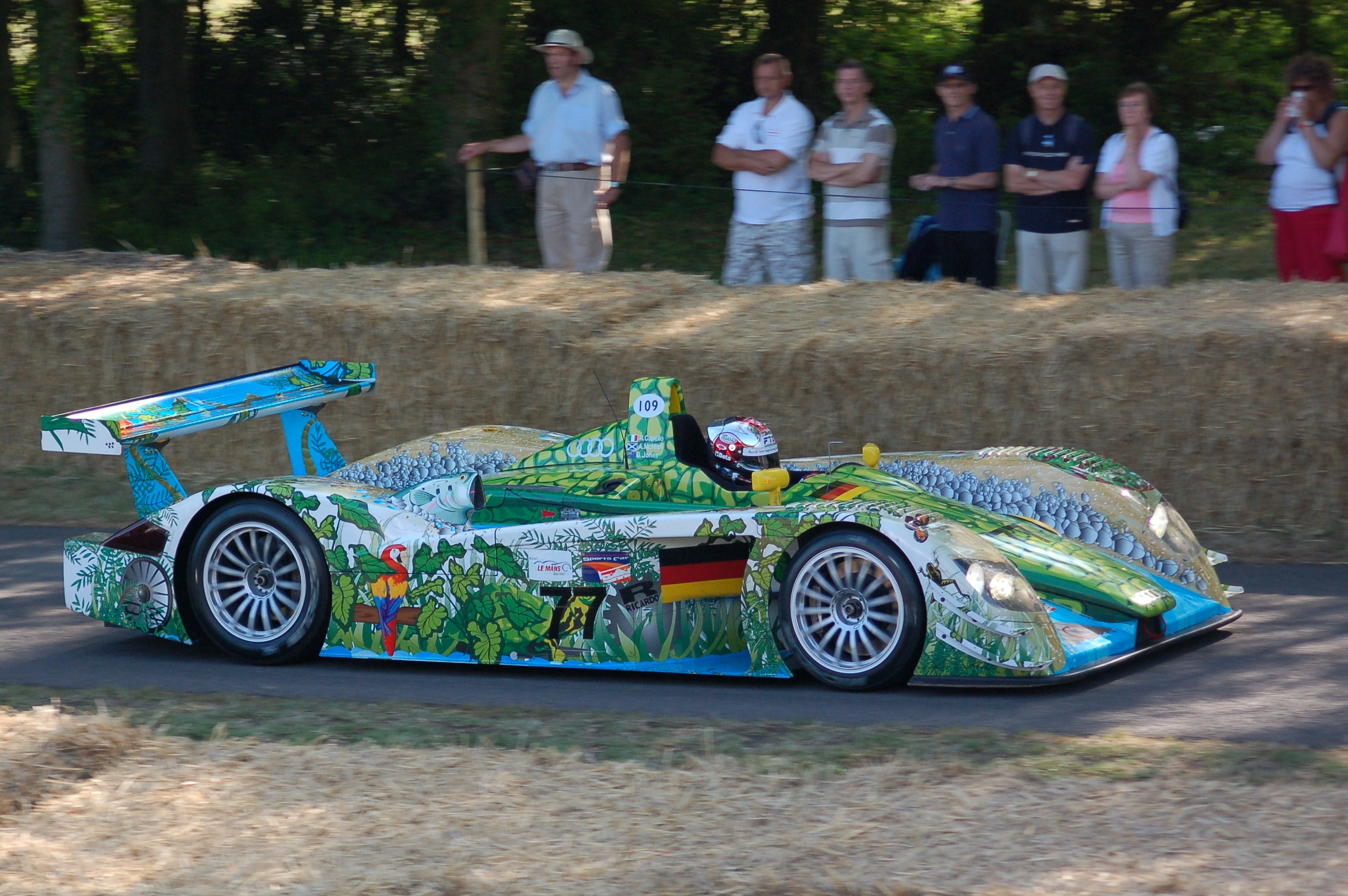
This R8, in a special crocodile livery, won the Race of a Thousand Years in Adelaide, Australia, in 2000 driven by Allan McNish and Rinaldo Capello.

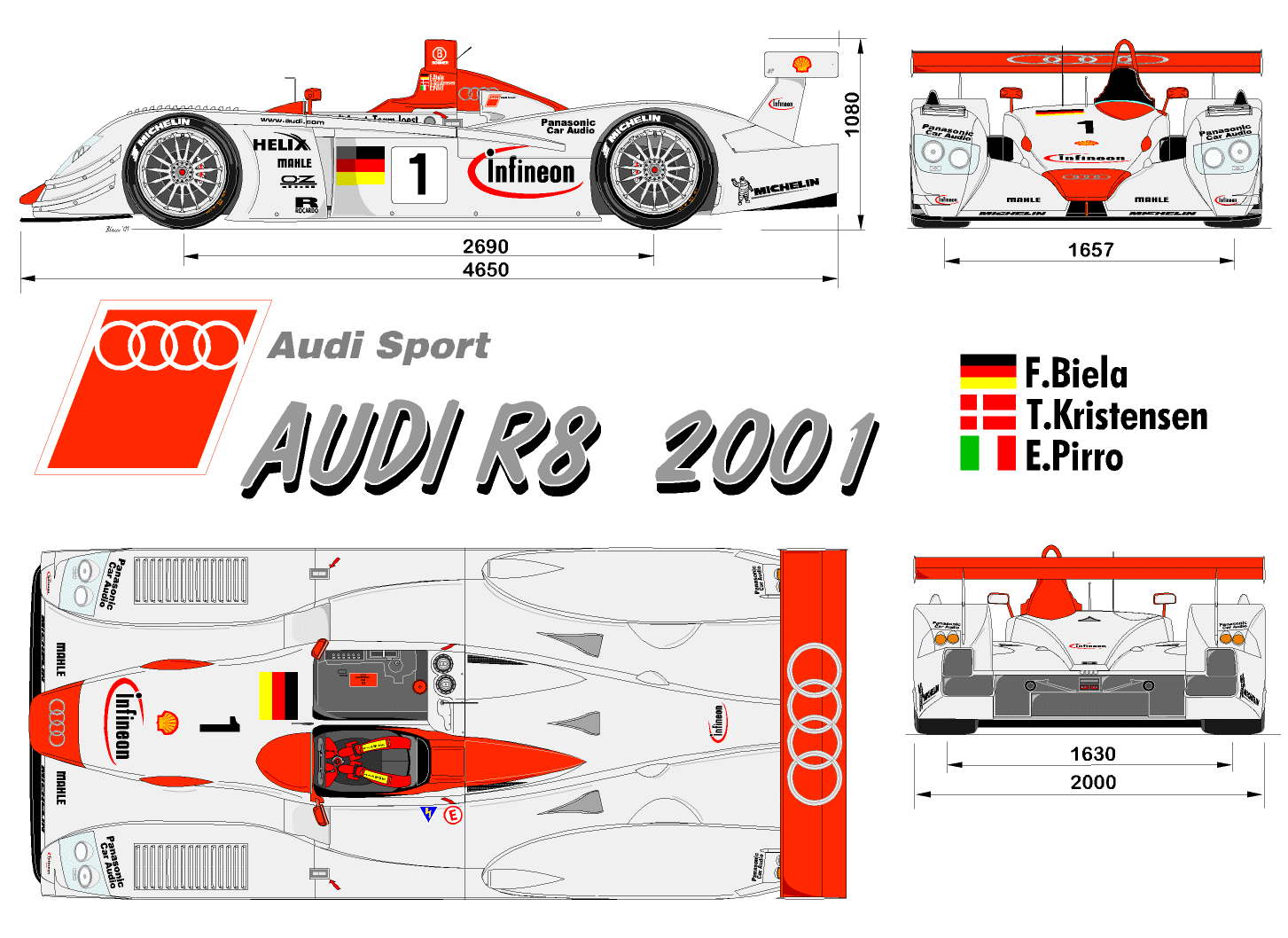
Audi R8 2001

The Audi R8 is a sports-racing car prepared for the LMP900 class at Le Mans and in the American Le Mans Series. The car was developed by Audi Motorsport and Joest Racing, and debuted in 2000, winning the 12 Hours of Sebring.

The R8 won Le Mans five times (2000, 2001, 2002, 2004, and 2005) and the overall season championship in the American Le Mans Series six times in a row (from 2000 to 2005).

The R8 won a hat trick at Le Mans in 2000–2002, campaigned by Audi Sport Infineon Team Joest and driven by Tom Kristensen, Emanuele Pirro, and Frank Biela. First time out in 2000, the team won a 1-2-3 finish. Since then, the Audi R8 has won numerous championships and races, including further wins for "privateer" teams at Le Mans in 2004 and 2005.

The R8 is powered by a 3.6 L Audi V8 with Fuel Stratified Injection (FSI), which is a variation on the concept of gasoline direct injection developed by VW; it maximizes both power and fuel economy at the same time. FSI technology can be found in products available to the public, across all brands in the Volkswagen Group.

The power supplied by the R8, officially listed at about 610 hp (455 kW) in 2000, 2001, and 2002, 550 hp (410.1 kW) in 2003 and 2004, and 520 hp (388 kW) in 2005, is sent to the rear wheels via a Ricardo six-speed sequential transmission with an electropneumatic paddle shift. Unofficially, the works team Audi R8 for Le Mans (2000, 2001, and 2002) is said to have had around 670 hp (500 kW) instead of the quoted 610 hp. The numbers were quoted at speed, and were due to the car making 50 extra horsepower due to twin ram-air intakes at speeds over 150 mph (240 km/h). Official torque numbers were quoted for this version of the engine at 516 lb⋅ft (700 N⋅m) at 6500 rpm. The equation for horsepower (torque divided by 5250, multiplied by rpm) for these numbers produces a horsepower rating of 638 horsepower (476 kW) at the same 6500 rpm (516/5250*6500=638). The Audi R8's structure was designed from the beginning to expedite parts changes during the race. The car's chassis has been likened to a Lego model — anything on the car can be changed and changed quickly. During its campaign, the Joest pit crew was able to change the entire rear transaxle of a damaged R8 — a process which usually takes between one and three hours — in as low as three minutes and 16 seconds. The reason for this was that the transmission, rear suspension, and rear subframe were built as one unit. The car had numerous quick-connect hoses and easily removable bolts. The whole rear section of the car could be removed as a whole and a new back half installed with the help of a crane. The Automobile Club de l'Ouest (ACO), organizers of the 24 Hours of Le Mans and the American Le Mans Series, acted quickly to void this advantage by mandating the gearbox casing be the same item through the duration of the race, with only the internals being allowed to be changed. However, the R8 still had quicker access to the gearbox internals than any other car due to its quick-change construction. This was critical as the gearbox was the weak link in the car.

The R8's structure and body are both composed of carbon fibre, a strong, lightweight polymer material.

Performance from top speed to acceleration was, as in most race car cases, variable depending on the car's setup. The highest speed of the R8 at Le Mans was 338 km/h (210 mph) in the practice sessions of the 2002 Le Mans 24 Hours Race. A low downforce setup could reach about 350 km/h (217 mph).

Audi Sport's program saw tragedy in 2001 when on April 25, popular ex-F1 driver Michele Alboreto died in an accident after suffering a high-speed tyre failure during an R8 test session at the Lausitzring in eastern Germany.

=== 2003: Bentley breaks the streak ===
The Bentley Speed 8, which was somewhat based on the R8 ran at Le Mans from 2001 to 2003, winning in 2003, used a heavily modified 4.0-L version of the V8 engine from the Audi R8 . The Bentley racing effort was campaigned by Team Bentley (Apex Motorsport) with assistance from longtime R8 competitor Joest Racing and Audi Sport UK. After 2002, the Joest factory team dropped its R8 campaign and left it to the privateers. Restrictor changes brought the power down to 550 bhp for anyone still racing with the R8, but the maximum torque hardly changed. Tom Kristensen, who won the previous three 24 Hours of Le Mans races in an R8, was assigned to drive the Bentley Speed 8, and helped guide the team to victory. (Kristensen went on to win the 2004 and 2005 races in an Audi R8). Some similarity exists between the Bentley Speed 8 and the Audi R8's successor, the R10 TDI.

=== 2005: End of active competition ===
During the 2005 season, its time at the front of the pack evidently was drawing to a close. Audi had made the development of the Audi R10 TDI diesel public, and cars from other manufacturers and teams started to catch up in terms of on-the-track speed. The ACO still felt that the R8 needed to be kept in check, so they reduced the restrictor size on the R8's engine, due to the car not meeting new hybrid regulations, and stipulated the car shall carry ballast weight in an attempt to make the races more competitive. The R8 was restricted even further to only 520 bhp. At the 2005 Le Mans, the Audis failed to qualify on pole position; the fastest R8 started the race in third position. However, the car was able to outlast all other competitors to eventually take its fifth checkered flag at the Circuit de la Sarthe and the 24 Hours of Le Mans. This victory was also notable since it was Tom Kristensen's sixth straight 24 Hours of Le Mans victory, and a record seventh overall, beating legendary driver Jacky Ickx's previous record of six career 24 Hours of Le Mans victories. To date, the R8 remains one of the fastest petrol-powered LMPs, setting a 3:29 at Le Mans, which was beaten only by the Lola-Aston Martins. However, the R8's best finish was at 379 laps, which is more than the Lola-Aston Martin's best at 373 laps.

== List of records ==
- 24 Hours of Le Mans winner - 2000, 2001, 2002, 2004, 2005
- American Le Mans Series champion: 2000, 2001, 2002, 2003, 2004, 2005, 2006^{†}
- European Le Mans Series champion: 2001
- Le Mans Series champion: 2004

† - Season partially run by the Audi R10

== Legacy ==
=== 2006: The R10 TDI ===
In response to the new level of competition, Audi developed a successor known as the Audi R10 TDI. The V12 engined turbodiesel won at its race debut at the 2006 12 Hours of Sebring with both cars starting on the front row. However, the pole-sitting R10 had to start from the pit lane due to the need to rectify heat exchanger issues.

Emanuele Pirro, Frank Biela, and Marco Werner made history by becoming the first drivers to win the Le Mans 24-hour race in a diesel-powered car. The Audi R10 TDI completed a record 380 laps of the La Sarthe circuit, with Pirro at the wheel for the finish. French trio Sébastien Loeb, Éric Hélary, and Franck Montagny took second in the Pescarolo Judd No 17, four laps back. Scotsman Allan McNish was third in the other Audi, which came in 13 laps down after suffering mechanical problems.

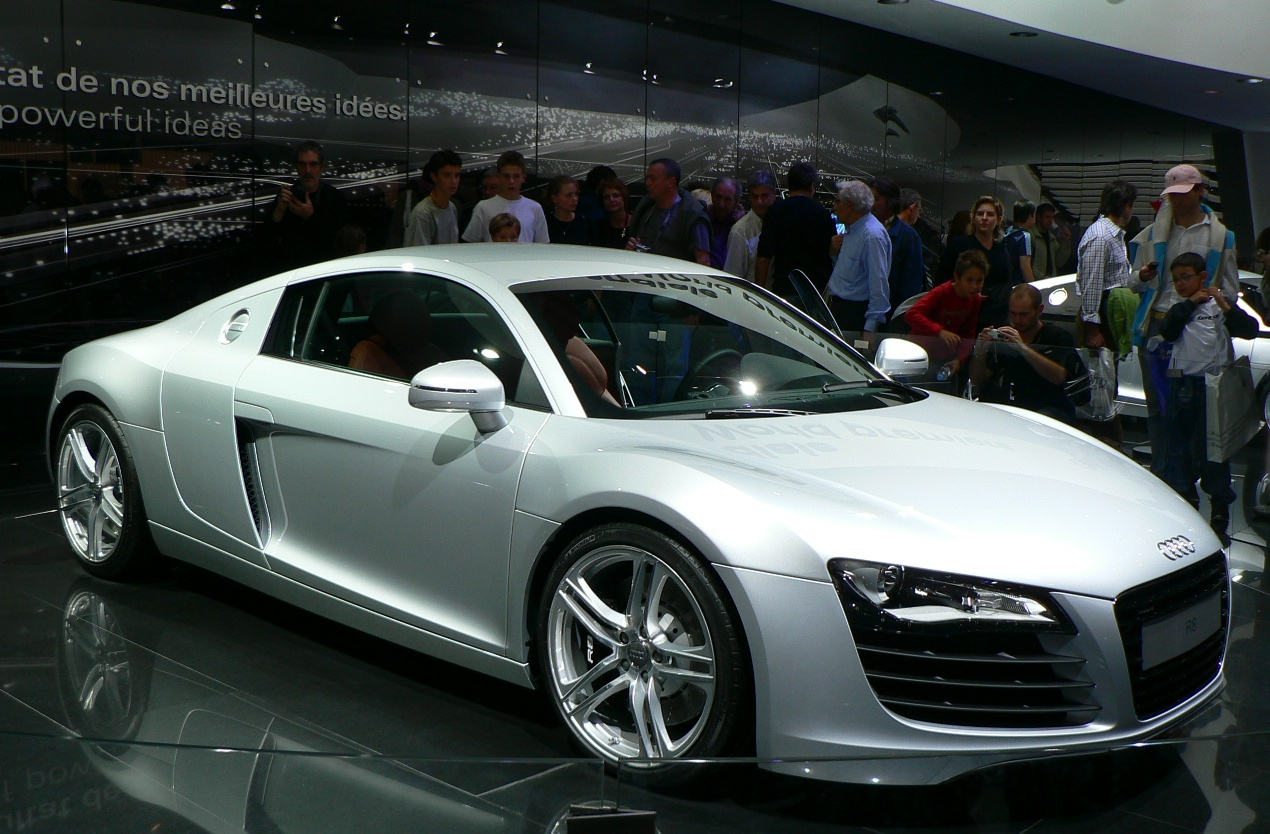
Audi R8 road car at the 2006 Paris Motor Show

The R8 continued to campaign the American Le Mans Series through the first half of the 2006 season, and made its final US appearance on July 1, 2006, at Lime Rock Park, Connecticut, piloted by McNish and Capello. The R8 ended its career in style by winning the race, marking the 50th American Le Mans Series victory for the Audi R8. The R10s participated in the rest of the ALMS season, beginning with the race at Miller Motorsports Park, Utah.

=== 2007: R8 road car ===
The name Audi R8 also is used by the production road sports car Audi R8, which is based on the 2003 Audi Le Mans quattro concept car. Production started in 2007.

== 24 Hours of Le Mans results ==
Year	Team	No	Drivers	Pole	Fastest lap	Laps	Overall Position
2000	(Germany) Audi Sport Team Joest	7	(Germany) Christian Abt (Italy) Michele Alboreto (Italy) Rinaldo Capello	no	no	365	3rd
2000	(Germany) Audi Sport Team Joest	8	(Germany) Frank Biela (Denmark) Tom Kristensen (Italy) Emanuele Pirro	no	no	368	1st
2000	(Germany) Audi Sport Team Joest	9	(France) Laurent Aïello (United Kingdom) Allan McNish (Monaco) Stéphane Ortelli	yes	yes	367	2nd
2001	(Germany) Audi Sport Team Joest	1	(Germany) Frank Biela (Denmark) Tom Kristensen (Italy) Emanuele Pirro	no	no	321	1st
2001	(Germany) Audi Sport North America	2	(France) Laurent Aïello (Italy) Rinaldo Capello (Italy) Christian Pescatori	yes	yes	320	2nd
2001	(United States) Champion Racing	3	(United Kingdom) Johnny Herbert (Belgium) Didier Theys (Germany) Ralf Kelleners	no	no	81	DNF
2001	(United Kingdom) Johansson Motorsport	4	(Sweden) Stefan Johansson (Netherlands) Tom Coronel (France) Patrick Lemarié	no	no	35	DNF
2002	(Germany) Audi Sport Team Joest	1	(Germany) Frank Biela (Denmark) Tom Kristensen (Italy) Emanuele Pirro	no	yes	375	1st
2002	(Germany) Audi Sport North America	2	(United Kingdom) Johnny Herbert (Italy) Rinaldo Capello (Italy) Christian Pescatori	yes	no	374	2nd
2002	(Germany) Audi Sport Team Joest	3	(Germany) Marco Werner (Germany) Michael Krumm (Austria) Philipp Peter	no	no	372	3rd
2002	Audi Sport Japan Team Goh	5	(Japan) Hiroki Katoh (France) Yannick Dalmas (Japan) Seiji Ara	no	no	358	7th
2003	Audi Sport Japan Team Goh	5	(Japan) Seiji Ara (Denmark) Jan Magnussen (Germany) Marco Werner	no	no	370	4th
2003	(United States) Champion Racing	6	(Finland) JJ Lehto (Italy) Emanuele Pirro (Sweden) Stefan Johansson	no	no	372	3rd
2003	(United Kingdom) Audi Sport UK (United Kingdom) Arena Motorsport	10	(Germany) Frank Biela (United Kingdom) Perry McCarthy (Finland) Mika Salo	no	no	28	DNF
2004	(United States) ADT Champion Racing	2	(Finland) JJ Lehto (Germany) Marco Werner (Italy) Emanuele Pirro	no	no	368	3rd
2004	Audi Sport Japan Team Goh	5	(Japan) Seiji Ara (Italy) Rinaldo Capello (Denmark) Tom Kristensen	no	no	379	1st
2004	(United Kingdom) Audi Sport UK Team Veloqx	8	(United Kingdom) Allan McNish (Germany) Frank Biela (Germany) Pierre Kaffer	no	no	350	5th
2004	(United Kingdom) Audi Sport UK Team Veloqx	88	(United Kingdom) Jamie Davies (United Kingdom) Johnny Herbert (United Kingdom) Guy Smith	yes	yes	379	2nd
2005	(United States) ADT Champion Racing	2	(Germany) Frank Biela (United Kingdom) Allan McNish (Italy) Emanuele Pirro	no	no	364	3rd
2005	(United States) ADT Champion Racing	3	(Finland) JJ Lehto (Denmark) Tom Kristensen (Germany) Marco Werner	no	no	370	1st
2005	(France) Audi PlayStation Team Oreca	4	(France) Franck Montagny (France) Jean-Marc Gounon (Monaco) Stéphane Ortelli	no	no	362	4th
