= Champion Racing =

Former race car team

(United States) Champion Racing
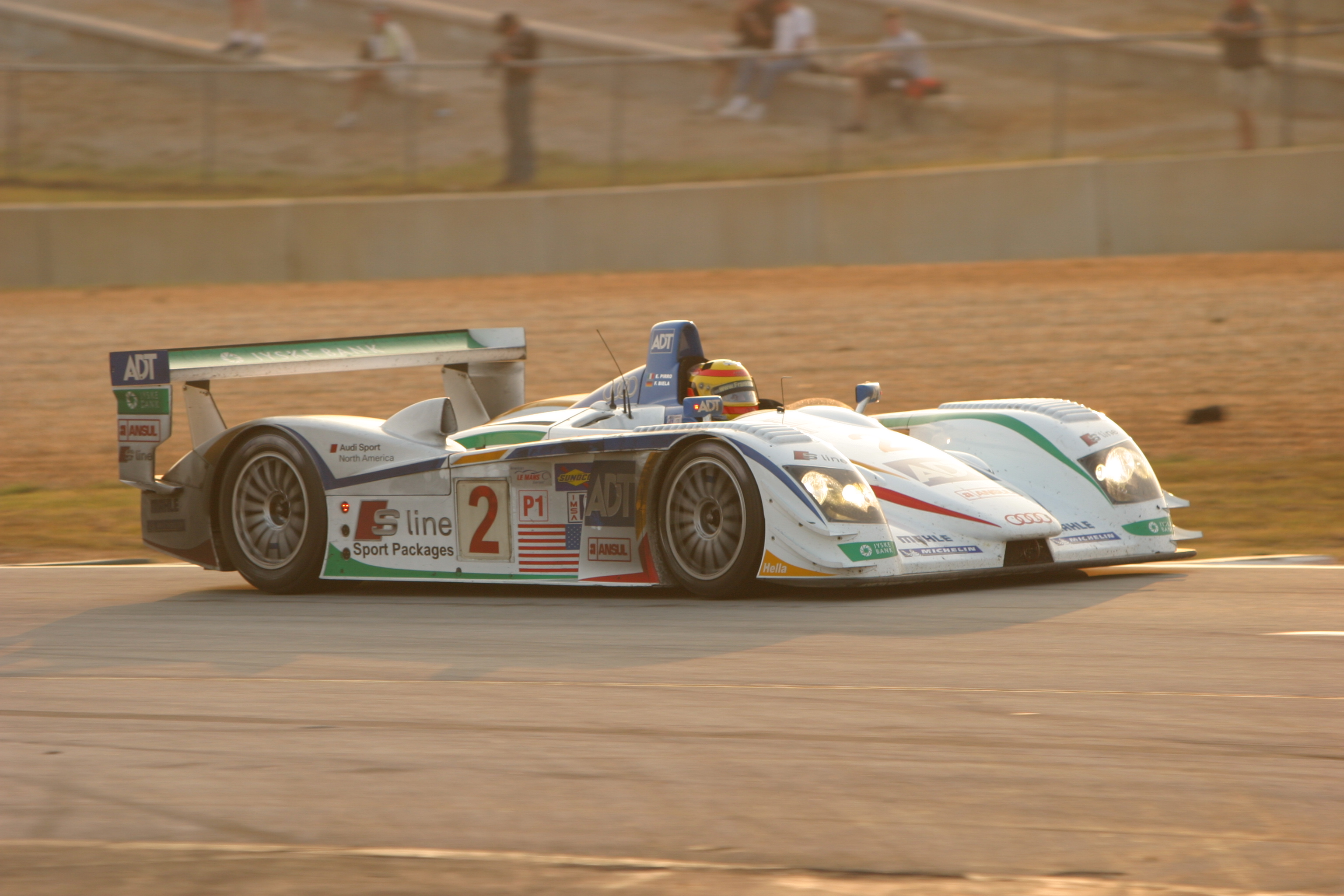
- Founded: 1994
- Folded: 2008
- Team principal(s): Dave Maraj
- Former series: American Le Mans Series, SCCA World Challenge
- Teams' Championships: 5 (2004, 2005, 2006, 2007, 2008)
- Drivers' Championships: 5 (2004, 2005, 2006, 2007, 2008)

Champion Racing was a sports car racing team based in Pompano Beach, Florida, USA. Founded in 1994 by Dave Maraj, a former rally driver from Trinidad, as the motorsport wing of the Champion Motors car dealership, the team has campaigned various Porsches and Audis in North American road racing series. Champion Racing's extensive record includes a win at the prestigious 24 Hours of Le Mans in 2005, and 5 straight American Le Mans Series LMP1 championships, 2 as a private team and 3 as a factory team under the name Audi Sport North America.

== Porsche years ==
Champion entered their first race at the 1993 12 Hours of Sebring, finishing 21st overall and 7th in the Invitational GT class with a Porsche 911 Carrera 2 driven by Justin Bell, Mike Peters, and Oliver Kuttner. Mike Peters later stopped race driving and became team manager for the team.

In 1994, they entered a 911 Turbo in several IMSA GT races, including the 24 Hours of Daytona and 12 Hours of Sebring.

For the 1995 season, Champion partnered with Michael Colucci Racing (MCR), and the team moved up to a 2 car team with a pair of 911 GT2. Champion running the #72 car (964 chassis) and MCR running the #74 car (993 chassis). After an accident put them out a Daytona, Hans-Joachim Stuck and Bill Adam finished 2nd in the GTS-1 class at Sebring. They also collected class podiums at Watkins Glen and Sears Point in the #74 car. In 1995 the team adopted the livery of a white background with various streaks of colours that has since become indelibly associated with the team. In fact, this livery was used on all Champion Racing entered cars, except for the special Stars & Stripes variation, using the blue and red colors of the American flag only, as tribute to the victims of the September 11 attacks.

In 1996, Stuck and Adam won the GTS-1 class at Sebring with the #74, the first major win for Champion Racing.

In 1997 Champion scaled back to a one car team, taking over the reins of the #74 Porsche with Stuck, Adam, and Thierry Boutsen finishing 2nd in class at the 1997 Daytona 24 Hours.

For 1998, Champion Racing purchased a Porsche 911 GT1 Evo. The team ran a full season in the USRRC GT1 class, winning the 6 Hours of Watkins Glen and finishing on the podium in 3 other races, winning the makes (Porsche) and drivers (Boutsen) championships. The team also competed in three PSCR races; Boutsen, Bob Wollek, and Andy Pilgrim finished 2nd in GT1 and 3rd overall at the 12 Hours of Sebring, Boutsen and Wollek won the GT1 class at Road Atlanta in June (3rd overall), and Boutsen, Wollek and Ralf Kelleners won the GT1 class at the inaugural Petit Le Mans, finishing 3rd overall, earning an automatic entry to the 1999 24 Hours of Le Mans.

In 1999, Champion ran the GT1 in the new American Le Mans Series. Due to the regulations, however, they were forced to run in the Prototype class against theoretically faster cars. They scored their best result in the 12 Hours of Sebring, finishing 4th overall and in class. The team also raced a Porsche 911 GT3-R in the 24 Hours of Le Mans, finishing 2nd in the GT class.

With no place to run the GT1 in 2000, Champion changed cars to a Lola B2K/10 with a Porsche engine. The team entered only two ALMS races (Sebring and Sears Point) and failed to finish either one. They also entered the 6 Hours of Watkins Glen, finishing 7th in class and 21st overall. The team spent most of the season developing the car, with the aim of a high finish at the 2001 24 Hours of Daytona.

Daytona 2001 started well; the team qualified 6th. However, a loss of oil pressure seven and a half hours in caused the car to retire. The team came back to finish 2nd in the Daytona finale at the end of the season. The team finally found some success with the Lola at the 2002 24 Hours of Daytona, finishing 4th. After the race, the team would abandon the project, however Oliver Kuttner's Pegasus Racing would run the car in the latter half of the season.

== World Challenge GT with Audi ==
In 2000, Champion partnered with Audi to develop and run the Audi S4 Competition in the SCCA Speedvision World Challenge series' GT class. For their first season, the pair of cars would be driven by reigning Touring Car champion Michael Galati and Le Mans winner Derek Bell. Bell finished 9th in the opening round at Charlotte. Galati would take 2nd in the championship, winning at Las Vegas and taking two other podiums. In 2001, Galati won the GT drivers' championship, taking 4 wins, and Audi won the manufacturers' championship by 1 point over Acura. In 2002, Galati would repeat as champion, with Bell 7th, and Audi 2nd in the manufacturers' standings.

In 2003, Champion debuted the new Audi RS6 Competition. Randy Pobst finished on the podium at the first five races of the season, and won the last two rounds to take the Drivers' championship, and the manufacturers' championship for Audi.

== American Le Mans Series ==
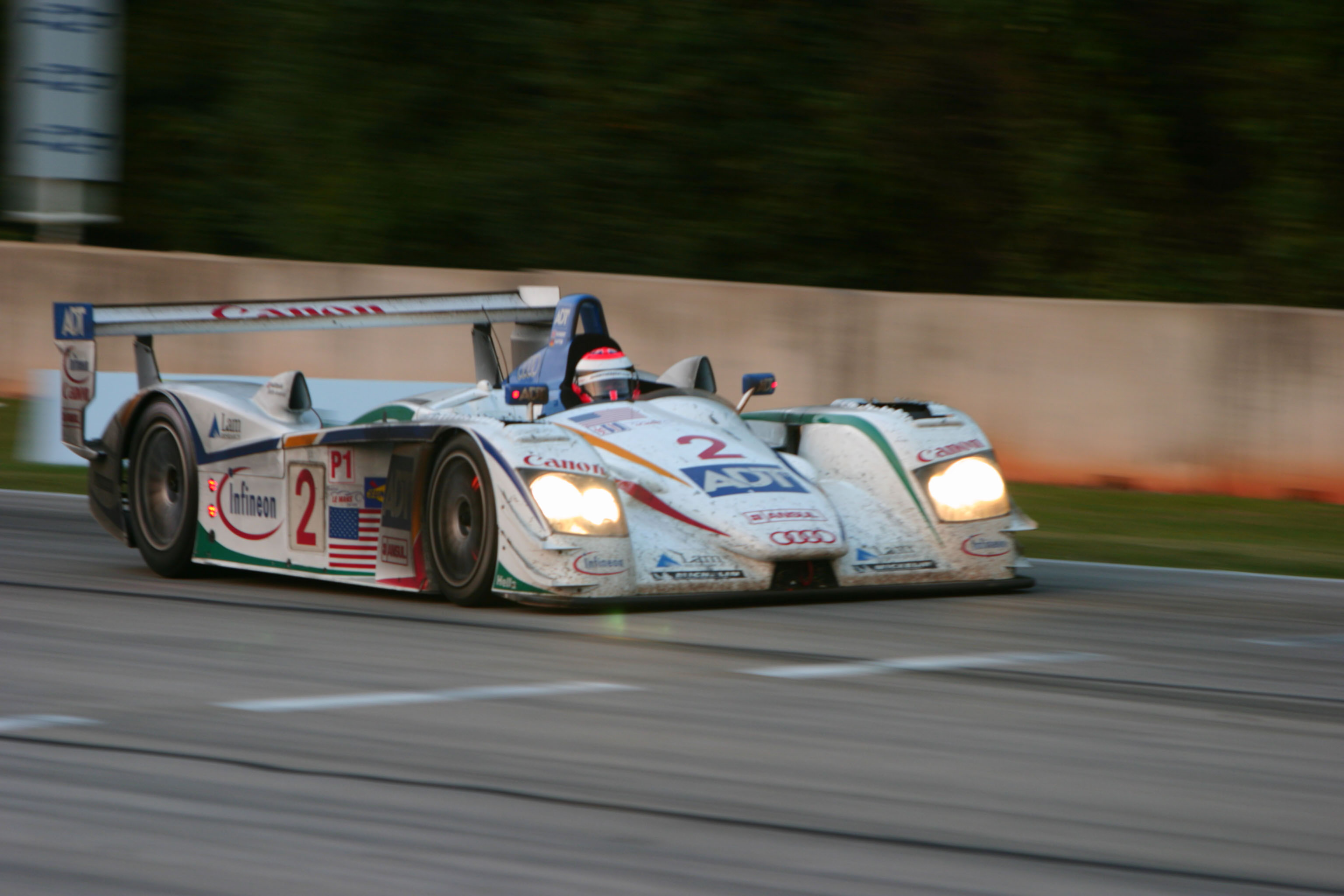
2005 Petit Le Mans

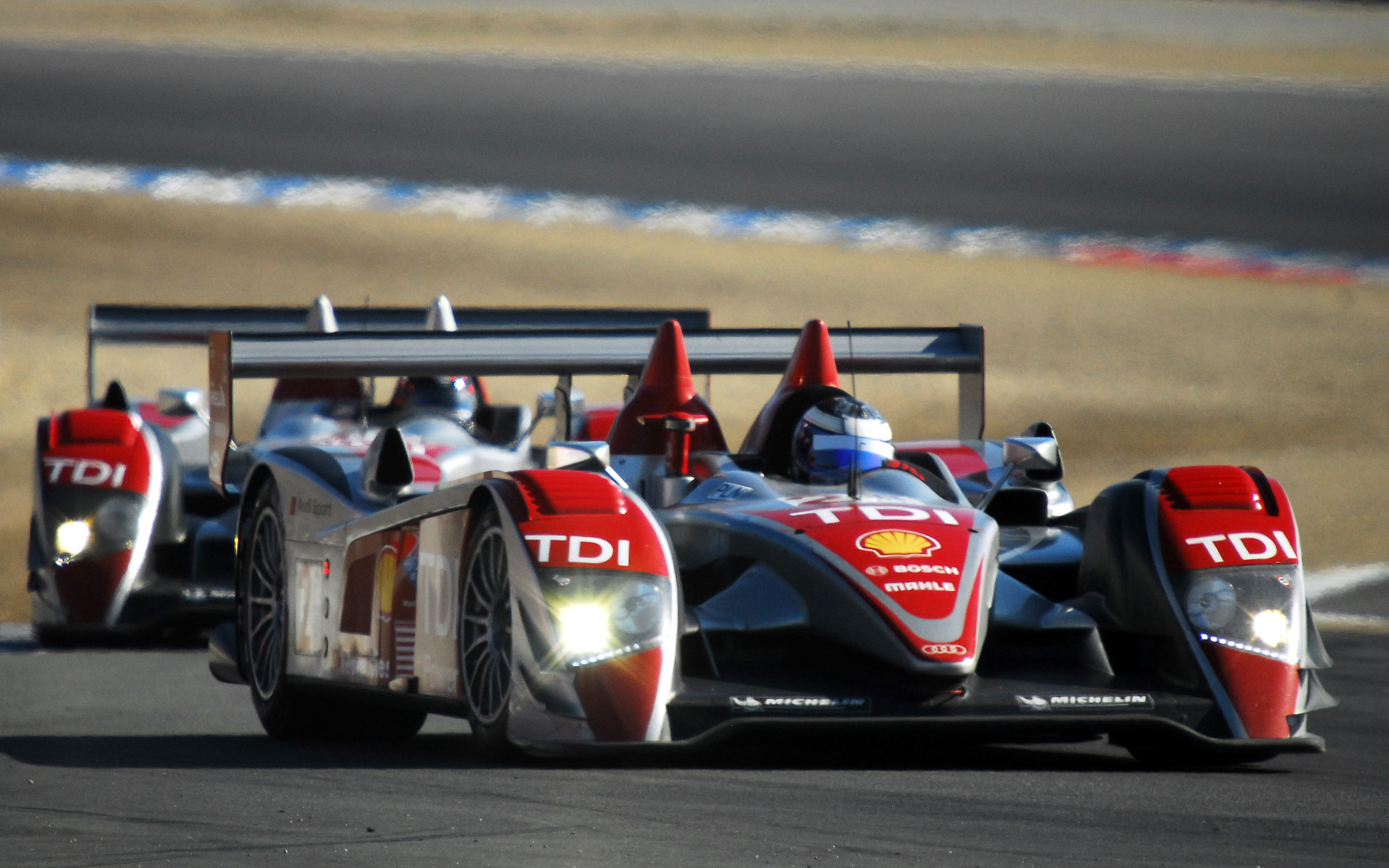
Mazda Raceway Laguna Seca

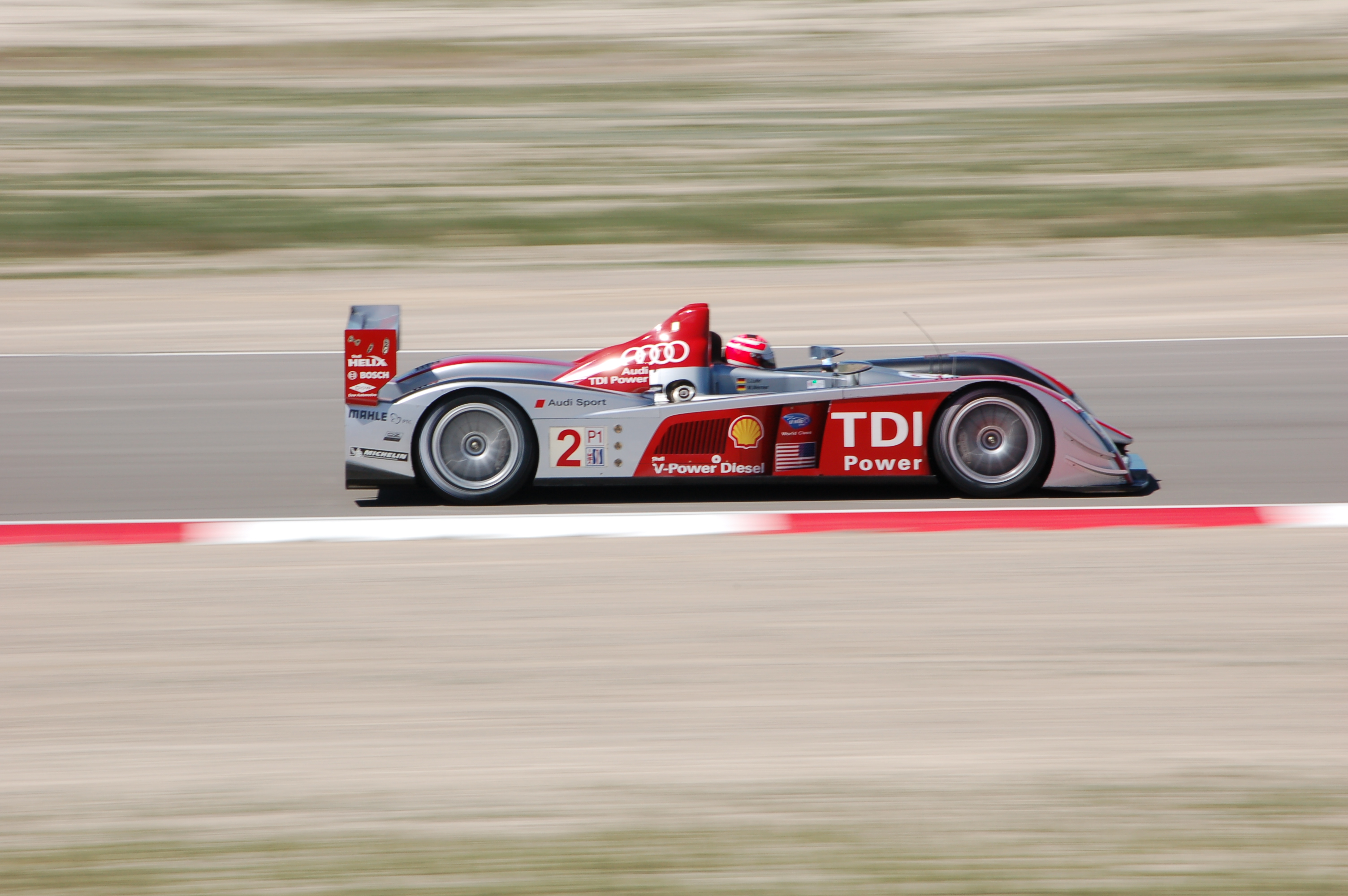
Miller Motorsports Park

=== 2001–05 (Audi R8) ===
In 2001, Champion Racing bought an Audi R8 for competition in the American Le Mans Series. The team finished 8 races of the 10 round season. The team claimed a third-place finish at both the 12 Hours of Sebring and Petit Le Mans as well as a second-place finish at the Mazda Raceway Laguna Seca round. The team finished 3rd in the LMP900 class championship.

For 2002, the team continued to compete with their Audi R8 in the full American Le Mans Series season. Having claimed a second-place finish at both the 12 Hours of Sebring and Petit Le Mans the team finished the season 2nd in the LMP900 class championship, behind the factory Joest Audi team.

2003 saw even more success for Champion Racing. After a second-place finish at the season opening 12 Hours of Sebring, the team went on to claim 4 overall victories including a win at Petit Le Mans. Champion Racing finished the season 2nd in the championship, only 7 points behind the factory Audi team.

In 2004, all the teams hard work paid off. With the absence of the factory Audi and Panoz teams, Dyson Racing became the team's main rival. After a second-place finish at the season opening 12 Hours of Sebring, the team claimed 7 overall victories and claimed the LMP1 team and drivers championship.

For 2005, the team campaigned the American Le Mans Series with its Audi R8 for the 5th straight year. Despite fierce competition from the Dyson Racing team, an overall victory at the 12 Hours of Sebring led to another 6 victories for the Champion Racing team. At the end of the season, the team claimed its second LMP1 team and drivers title.

=== 2006–08 (Audi R10) ===
In 2006, Champion Racing earned full-factory support from Audi and took over the Audi Sport North America title from Joest Racing. The team started the season with an overall victory at the 12 Hours of Sebring with the brand new Audi R10 TDI. With the new car needing more testing and development, the team returned to the Audi R8 for 3 races. The R10 returned to competition at Lime Rock Park. The team claim overall victories at 9 of the 10 races comfortably giving the team the LMP1 team and drivers championship titles.

2007 saw the Porsche and Acura LMP2 cars become the team's biggest challenge. Rule changes by the ACO made LMP2 cars the ability to compete for overall victories, particularly at the smaller, tighter tracks on the ALMS schedule. Despite claiming 12 straight class victories, the Penske Racing Porsche RS Spyders were able to beat the Audi R10s 8 times for overall victory. By the end of the season, the team claimed the LMP1 team and drivers championship titles.

In 2008, Champion Racing fought back against the competition of the LMP2 cars. Despite losing out on a victory at the 12 Hours of Sebring, the team claimed 10 class victories as well as 7 overall victories in the 11 race season. At the end of the season, Champion Racing claimed their 5th straight LMP1 team and drivers championship title.

At the end of the 2008 season, Audi announced its withdrawal from the American Le Mans Series, citing economic pressures. While Audi would continue to compete in select ALMS events, it would contest them with Joest Racing, bringing to an end Champion Racing's motorsport activities.

== 24 Hours of Le Mans ==
Year	Entrant	No.	Car	Drivers	Class	Laps	Pos.	Class Pos.
1999	(United States) Champion Racing Dave Maraj	80	Porsche 911 GT3-R	(Germany) Bernd Mayländer (Germany) Dirk Müller (France) Bob Wollek	LMGT	292	19th	2nd
2001	(United States) Champion Racing	3	Audi R8	(United Kingdom) Johnny Herbert (Germany) Ralf Kelleners (Belgium) Didier Theys	LMP900	81	DNF	DNF
2003	(United States) Champion Racing	6	Audi R8	(Sweden) Stefan Johansson (Finland) JJ Lehto (Italy) Emanuele Pirro	LMP900	372	3rd	1st
2004	(United States) ADT Champion Racing	2	Audi R8	(Finland) JJ Lehto (Italy) Emanuele Pirro (Germany) Marco Werner	LMP1	368	3rd	3rd
2005	(United States) ADT Champion Racing	2	Audi R8	(Germany) Frank Biela (United Kingdom) Allan McNish (Italy) Emanuele Pirro	LMP1	364	3rd	3rd
2005	(United States) ADT Champion Racing	3	Audi R8	(Denmark) Tom Kristensen (Finland) JJ Lehto (Germany) Marco Werner	LMP1	370	1st	1st
