= 2000 Silverstone 500 USA Challenge =

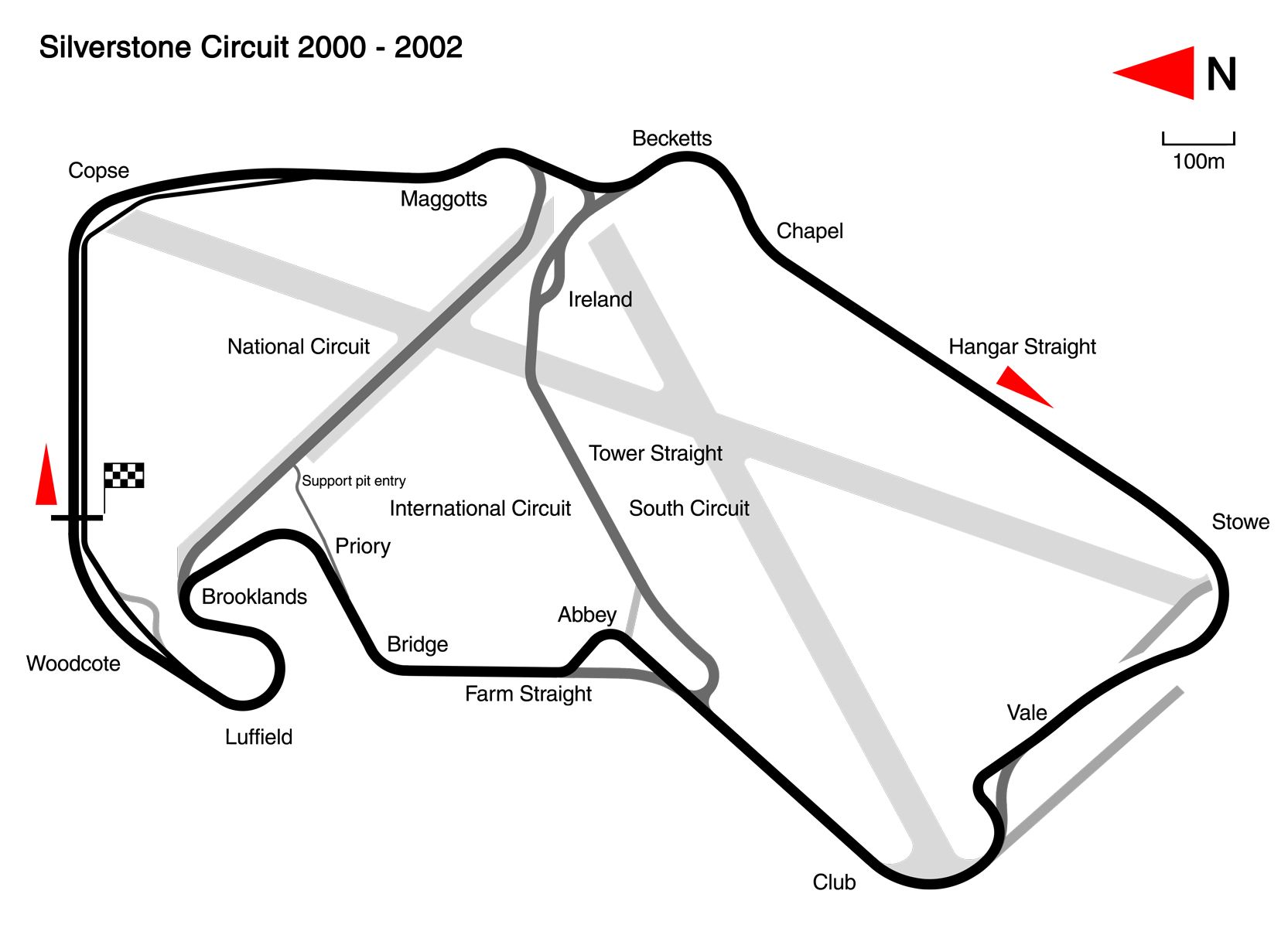
Map of the Silverstone Circuit (2000–2002)

The 2000 Silverstone 500 USA Challenge was the third round of the 2000 American Le Mans Series season. It took place at Silverstone Circuit, United Kingdom, on 13 May 2000.

This event was the first American Le Mans Series race held outside of North America. It served as a precursor to the creation of the European Le Mans Series by gauging the willingness of European teams from the FIA Sportscar Championship and FIA GT Championship to participate in a series identical to the American Le Mans Series. This event also shared the weekend at Silverstone with an FIA GT round, with some GT teams running both events.

== Race results ==
Class winners in bold.

Pos	Class	No	Team	Drivers	Chassis	Tyre	Laps
Pos	Class	No	Team	Drivers	Engine	Tyre	Laps
1	**LMP**	**42**	**(Germany) BMW Motorsport (Germany) Schnitzer Motorsport**	**(Germany) Jörg Müller (Finland) JJ Lehto**	**BMW V12 LMR**	M	**98**
1	**LMP**	**42**	**(Germany) BMW Motorsport (Germany) Schnitzer Motorsport**	**(Germany) Jörg Müller (Finland) JJ Lehto**	**BMW S70/3 6.0 L V12**	M	**98**
2	LMP	1	(United States) Panoz Motor Sports	(Australia) David Brabham (Denmark) Jan Magnussen	Panoz LMP-1 Roadster-S	M	98
2	LMP	1	(United States) Panoz Motor Sports	(Australia) David Brabham (Denmark) Jan Magnussen	Élan 6L8 6.0 L V8	M	98
3	LMP	77	(Germany) Audi Sport North America	(Italy) Rinaldo Capello (United Kingdom) Allan McNish	Audi R8R	M	98
3	LMP	77	(Germany) Audi Sport North America	(Italy) Rinaldo Capello (United Kingdom) Allan McNish	Audi 3.6 L Turbo V8	M	98
4	LMP	78	(Germany) Audi Sport North America	(Germany) Frank Biela (Italy) Emanuele Pirro	Audi R8R	M	97
4	LMP	78	(Germany) Audi Sport North America	(Germany) Frank Biela (Italy) Emanuele Pirro	Audi 3.6 L Turbo V8	M	97
5 DNF	LMP	2	(United States) Panoz Motor Sports	(United States) Johnny O'Connell (Japan) Hiroki Katoh	Panoz LMP-1 Roadster-S	M	97
5 DNF	LMP	2	(United States) Panoz Motor Sports	(United States) Johnny O'Connell (Japan) Hiroki Katoh	Élan 6L8 6.0 L V8	M	97
6	LMP	31	(France) Motorola DAMS	(France) Emmanuel Collard (France) Éric Bernard	Cadillac Northstar LMP	P	97
6	LMP	31	(France) Motorola DAMS	(France) Emmanuel Collard (France) Éric Bernard	Cadillac Northstar 4.0 L Turbo V8	P	97
7	LMP	16	(France) Pescarolo Sport	(France) Sébastien Bourdais (France) Olivier Grouillard (France) Emmanuel Clérico	Courage C52	M	94
7	LMP	16	(France) Pescarolo Sport	(France) Sébastien Bourdais (France) Olivier Grouillard (France) Emmanuel Clérico	Peugeot A32 3.2 L Turbo V6	M	94
8	**GTS**	**91**	**(France) Viper Team Oreca**	**(Monaco) Olivier Beretta (Austria) Karl Wendlinger**	**Dodge Viper GTS-R**	M	**91**
8	**GTS**	**91**	**(France) Viper Team Oreca**	**(Monaco) Olivier Beretta (Austria) Karl Wendlinger**	**Dodge EWB 8.0 L V10**	M	**91**
9	GTS	92	(France) Viper Team Oreca	(United States) David Donohue (United States) Tommy Archer	Dodge Viper GTS-R	M	90
9	GTS	92	(France) Viper Team Oreca	(United States) David Donohue (United States) Tommy Archer	Dodge EWB 8.0 L V10	M	90
10	LMP	17	(France) SMG	(France) Philippe Gache (South Africa) Gary Formato	Courage C60	P	88
10	LMP	17	(France) SMG	(France) Philippe Gache (South Africa) Gary Formato	Judd GV4 4.0 L V10	P	88
11	GTS	49	(Germany) Freisinger Motorsport	(France) Stéphane Ortelli (Germany) Wolfgang Kaufmann	Porsche 911 GT2	D	88
11	GTS	49	(Germany) Freisinger Motorsport	(France) Stéphane Ortelli (Germany) Wolfgang Kaufmann	Porsche M64/83 3.8 L Turbo Flat-6	D	88
12	LMP	0	(Italy) Team Rafanelli SRL	(Italy) Mimmo Schiattarella (Belgium) Didier de Radiguès	Lola B2K/10	M	88
12	LMP	0	(Italy) Team Rafanelli SRL	(Italy) Mimmo Schiattarella (Belgium) Didier de Radiguès	Judd (Rafanelli) GV4 4.0 L V10	M	88
13	**GT**	**51**	**(United States) Dick Barbour Racing**	**(Germany) Sascha Maassen (France) Bob Wollek**	**Porsche 911 GT3-R**	M	**87**
13	**GT**	**51**	**(United States) Dick Barbour Racing**	**(Germany) Sascha Maassen (France) Bob Wollek**	**Porsche M96/77 3.6 L Flat-6**	M	**87**
14	GTS	33	(Germany) Konrad Motorsport	(Austria) Franz Konrad (Germany) Jürgen von Gartzen	Porsche 911 GT2	D	87
14	GTS	33	(Germany) Konrad Motorsport	(Austria) Franz Konrad (Germany) Jürgen von Gartzen	Porsche M64/83 3.8 L Turbo Flat-6	D	87
15	GT	23	(United States) Alex Job Racing	(United States) Randy Pobst (Belgium) Bruno Lambert	Porsche 911 GT3-R	M	87
15	GT	23	(United States) Alex Job Racing	(United States) Randy Pobst (Belgium) Bruno Lambert	Porsche M96/77 3.6 L Flat-6	M	87
16	GT	21	(United States) MCR/Aspen Knolls	(United States) Shane Lewis (United States) Cort Wagner	Porsche 911 GT3-R	P	86
16	GT	21	(United States) MCR/Aspen Knolls	(United States) Shane Lewis (United States) Cort Wagner	Porsche M96/77 3.6 L Flat-6	P	86
17	GTS	44	(United Kingdom) BVB Motorsport	(United Kingdom) Geoff Lister (United Kingdom) Max Beaverbroock	Porsche 911 GT2	D	86
17	GTS	44	(United Kingdom) BVB Motorsport	(United Kingdom) Geoff Lister (United Kingdom) Max Beaverbroock	Porsche M64/83 3.8 L Turbo Flat-6	D	86
18	GT	5	(United States) Dick Barbour Racing	(Germany) Dirk Müller (Germany) Lucas Luhr	Porsche 911 GT3-R	M	86
18	GT	5	(United States) Dick Barbour Racing	(Germany) Dirk Müller (Germany) Lucas Luhr	Porsche M96/77 3.6 L Flat-6	M	86
19	GTS	61	(United Kingdom) Chamberlain Motorsport	(Switzerland) Walter Brun (Switzerland) Toni Seiler	Chrysler Viper GTS-R	M	86
19	GTS	61	(United Kingdom) Chamberlain Motorsport	(Switzerland) Walter Brun (Switzerland) Toni Seiler	Chrysler EWB 8.0 L V10	M	86
20	GT	22	(United States) Alex Job Racing	(United States) Mike Fitzgerald (United States) Robert Nagel	Porsche 911 GT3-R	M	86
20	GT	22	(United States) Alex Job Racing	(United States) Mike Fitzgerald (United States) Robert Nagel	Porsche M96/77 3.6 L Flat-6	M	86
21	GTS	08	(United States) Roock Motorsport North America	(United States) Zak Brown (United States) Vic Rice (Germany) Hubert Haupt	Porsche 911 GT2	Y	86
21	GTS	08	(United States) Roock Motorsport North America	(United States) Zak Brown (United States) Vic Rice (Germany) Hubert Haupt	Porsche M64/83 3.8 L Turbo Flat-6	Y	86
22	GT	6	(United States) Prototype Technology Group	(United States) Johannes van Overbeek (United States) Boris Said (Germany) Hans-Joachim Stuck	BMW M3	Y	85
22	GT	6	(United States) Prototype Technology Group	(United States) Johannes van Overbeek (United States) Boris Said (Germany) Hans-Joachim Stuck	BMW S54B32 3.2 L I6	Y	85
23	GTS	62	(United Kingdom) Chamberlain Motorsport	(Austria) Horst Felbermayr Jr. (Canada) Michael Culver	Chrysler Viper GTS-R	M	85
23	GTS	62	(United Kingdom) Chamberlain Motorsport	(Austria) Horst Felbermayr Jr. (Canada) Michael Culver	Chrysler EWB 8.0 L V10	M	85
24	GT	70	(Australia) Skea Racing Kingston	(United Kingdom) Johnny Mowlem (United States) David Murry	Porsche 911 GT3-R	P	85
24	GT	70	(Australia) Skea Racing Kingston	(United Kingdom) Johnny Mowlem (United States) David Murry	Porsche M96/77 3.6 L Flat-6	P	85
25	GT	41	(Switzerland) LR Organisation	(France) Christophe Bouchut (France) Michel Ligonnet	Porsche 911 GT3-R	M	84
25	GT	41	(Switzerland) LR Organisation	(France) Christophe Bouchut (France) Michel Ligonnet	Porsche M96/77 3.6 L Flat-6	M	84
26	LMP	20	(Germany) Kremer Racing	(United Kingdom) Christian Vann (Germany) Christian Gläsel	Lola B98/K2000	G	84
26	LMP	20	(Germany) Kremer Racing	(United Kingdom) Christian Vann (Germany) Christian Gläsel	Ford (Roush) 6.0 L V8	G	84
27	GT	07	(Germany) RWS Red Bull Motorsport	(Austria) Dieter Quester (Austria) Hans-Jörg Hofer (Italy) Luca Riccitelli	Porsche 911 GT3-R	M	84
27	GT	07	(Germany) RWS Red Bull Motorsport	(Austria) Dieter Quester (Austria) Hans-Jörg Hofer (Italy) Luca Riccitelli	Porsche M96/77 3.6 L Flat-6	M	84
28 DNF	GT	10	(United States) Prototype Technology Group	(United States) Peter Cunningham (United States) Brian Cunningham (Sweden) Niclas Jönsson	BMW M3	Y	82
28 DNF	GT	10	(United States) Prototype Technology Group	(United States) Peter Cunningham (United States) Brian Cunningham (Sweden) Niclas Jönsson	BMW S54B32 3.2 L I6	Y	82
29	GT	68	(Germany) Seikel Motorsport	(Belgium) Michel Neugarten (Canada) Tony Burgess	Porsche 911 GT3-R	D	82
29	GT	68	(Germany) Seikel Motorsport	(Belgium) Michel Neugarten (Canada) Tony Burgess	Porsche M96/77 3.6 L Flat-6	D	82
30	GT	69	(Canada) Kyser Racing	(Canada) Kye Wankum (Canada) Greg Doff	Porsche 911 GT3-R	P	74
30	GT	69	(Canada) Kyser Racing	(Canada) Kye Wankum (Canada) Greg Doff	Porsche M96/77 3.6 L Flat-6	P	74
31 DNF	GT	71	(Australia) Skea Racing Kingston	(Australia) Rohan Skea (United States) Doc Bundy	Porsche 911 GT3-R	P	62
31 DNF	GT	71	(Australia) Skea Racing Kingston	(Australia) Rohan Skea (United States) Doc Bundy	Porsche M96/77 3.6 L Flat-6	P	62
32 DNF	LMP	43	(Germany) BMW Motorsport (Germany) Schnitzer Motorsport	(France) Jean-Marc Gounon (United States) Bill Auberlen	BMW V12 LMR	M	56
32 DNF	LMP	43	(Germany) BMW Motorsport (Germany) Schnitzer Motorsport	(France) Jean-Marc Gounon (United States) Bill Auberlen	BMW S70/3 6.0 L V12	M	56
33 DNF	LMP	32	(France) Motorola DAMS	(France) Christophe Tinseau (Belgium) Marc Goossens	Cadillac Northstar LMP	P	39
33 DNF	LMP	32	(France) Motorola DAMS	(France) Christophe Tinseau (Belgium) Marc Goossens	Cadillac Northstar 4.0 L Turbo V8	P	39
34 DNF	LMP	36	(United States) Johansson-Matthews Racing	(Sweden) Stefan Johansson (United Kingdom) Guy Smith	Reynard 2KQ-LM	Y	32
34 DNF	LMP	36	(United States) Johansson-Matthews Racing	(Sweden) Stefan Johansson (United Kingdom) Guy Smith	Judd GV4 4.0 L V10	Y	32
35 DNF	LMP	02	(Germany) Pole Team	(Germany) Norman Simon (Germany) Günther Blieninger (United States) Mark Simo	Riley & Scott Mk III	M	22
35 DNF	LMP	02	(Germany) Pole Team	(Germany) Norman Simon (Germany) Günther Blieninger (United States) Mark Simo	Judd GV4 4.0 L V10	M	22
DNS	LMP	24	(United Kingdom) Team Ascari	(Netherlands) Klaas Zwart (Brazil) Max Wilson	Ascari A410	P	-
DNS	LMP	24	(United Kingdom) Team Ascari	(Netherlands) Klaas Zwart (Brazil) Max Wilson	Judd GV4 4.0 L V10	P	-

== Statistics ==
- Pole Position - #0 Team Rafanelli - 1:37.030
- Fastest Lap - #0 Team Rafanelli - 1:39.748
- Distance - 503.744 km
- Average Speed - 172.607 km/h

American Le Mans Series
Previous race: 2000 Grand Prix of Charlotte	2000 season	Next race: 2000 1000 km of Nürburgring
