= 1999 12 Hours of Sebring =

Sports car endurance race

Track map of the Sebring International Raceway

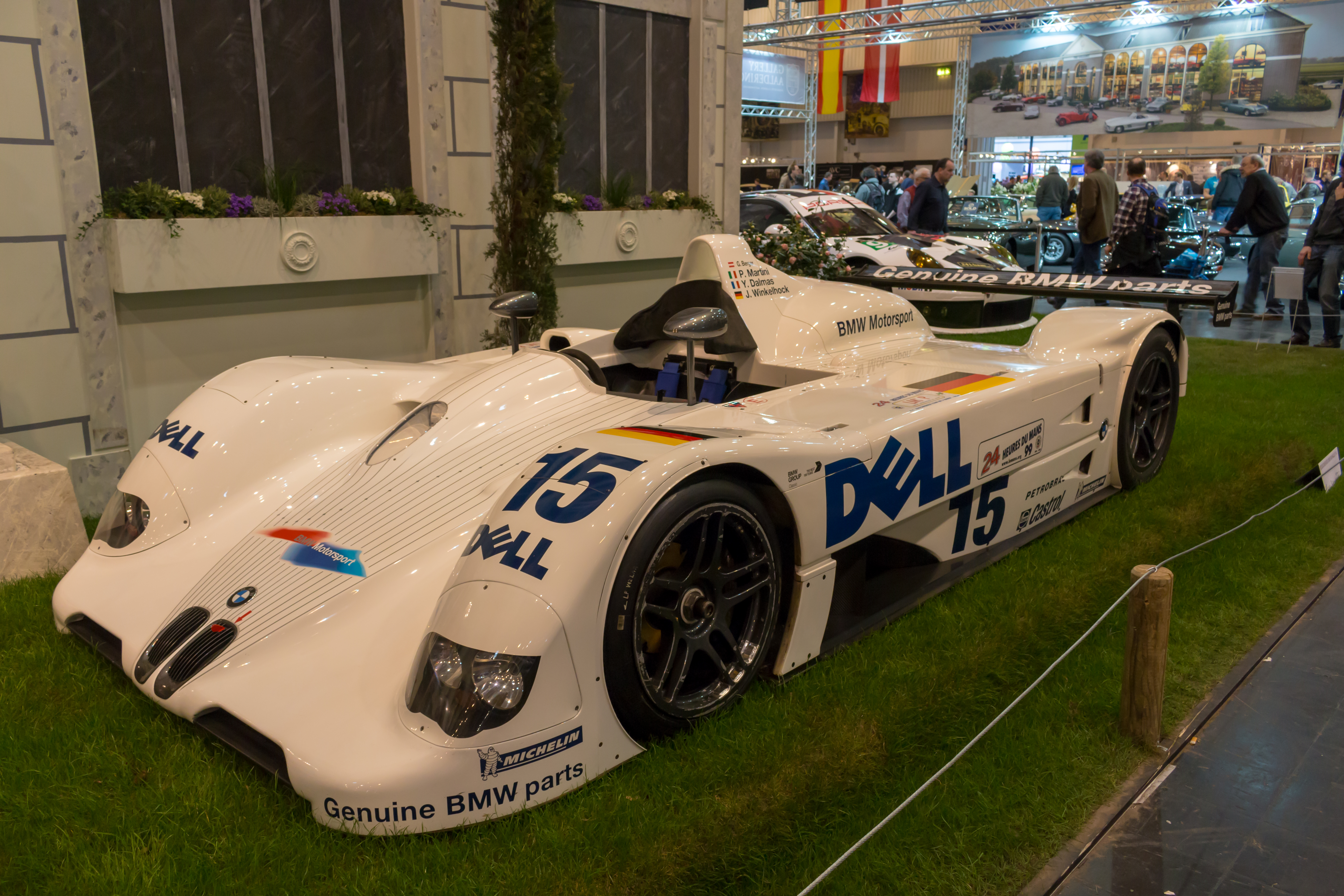
BMW V12 LMR

The 1999 Exxon Superflo 12 Hours of Sebring was the 47th running of the 12 Hours of Sebring. It also served as the first event in the new American Le Mans Series, which had replaced the IMSA GT Championship as the International Motor Sports Association's premiere series. It took place at Sebring International Raceway, Florida, on March 20, 1999.

== Race results ==
Class winners in bold.

Pos	Class	No	Team	Drivers	Chassis	Tyre	Laps
Pos	Class	No	Team	Drivers	Engine	Tyre	Laps
1	**LMP**	**42**	**(Germany) BMW Motorsport (Germany) Schnitzer Motorsport**	**(Germany) Jörg Müller (Finland) JJ Lehto (Denmark) Tom Kristensen**	**BMW V12 LMR**	**MI**	**313**
1	**LMP**	**42**	**(Germany) BMW Motorsport (Germany) Schnitzer Motorsport**	**(Germany) Jörg Müller (Finland) JJ Lehto (Denmark) Tom Kristensen**	**BMW S70 6.0 L V12**	**MI**	**313**
2	LMP	20	(United States) Dyson Racing	(United States) Butch Leitzinger (United States) Elliott Forbes-Robinson (United Kingdom) James Weaver	Riley & Scott Mk III	**G**	313
2	LMP	20	(United States) Dyson Racing	(United States) Butch Leitzinger (United States) Elliott Forbes-Robinson (United Kingdom) James Weaver	Ford 5.0 L V8	**G**	313
3	LMP	77	(Germany) Audi Sport Team Joest	(Italy) Michele Alboreto (Italy) Rinaldo Capello (Sweden) Stefan Johansson	Audi R8R	**MI**	310
3	LMP	77	(Germany) Audi Sport Team Joest	(Italy) Michele Alboreto (Italy) Rinaldo Capello (Sweden) Stefan Johansson	Audi 3.6 L Turbo V8	**MI**	310
4	LMP	38	(United States) Champion Racing	(Germany) Dirk Müller (Belgium) Thierry Boutsen (France) Bob Wollek	Porsche 911 GT1 Evo	**MI**	308
4	LMP	38	(United States) Champion Racing	(Germany) Dirk Müller (Belgium) Thierry Boutsen (France) Bob Wollek	Porsche 3.2 L Turbo Flat-6	**MI**	308
5	LMP	78	(Germany) Audi Sport Team Joest	(United Kingdom) Perry McCarthy (Germany) Frank Biela (Italy) Emanuele Pirro	Audi R8R	**MI**	304
5	LMP	78	(Germany) Audi Sport Team Joest	(United Kingdom) Perry McCarthy (Germany) Frank Biela (Italy) Emanuele Pirro	Audi 3.6 L Turbo V8	**MI**	304
6	LMP	12	(United States) Doyle-Risi Racing	(Italy) Alex Caffi (Italy) Max Angelelli (South Africa) Wayne Taylor (Argentina) Juan Manuel Fangio II	Ferrari 333 SP	**P**	294
6	LMP	12	(United States) Doyle-Risi Racing	(Italy) Alex Caffi (Italy) Max Angelelli (South Africa) Wayne Taylor (Argentina) Juan Manuel Fangio II	Ferrari F310E 4.0 L V12	**P**	294
7	LMP	15	(United States) Hybrid R&D	(United States) Chris Bingham (Canada) Ross Bentley (Belgium) Marc Duez	Riley & Scott Mk III	**Y**	292
7	LMP	15	(United States) Hybrid R&D	(United States) Chris Bingham (Canada) Ross Bentley (Belgium) Marc Duez	Ford 5.0 L V8	**Y**	292
8	LMP	62	(United States) Downing Atlanta	(United States) Dennis Spencer (United States) A.J. Smith (United States) Rich Grupp	Kudzu DLM	**G**	290
8	LMP	62	(United States) Downing Atlanta	(United States) Dennis Spencer (United States) A.J. Smith (United States) Rich Grupp	Mazda 2.0 L 3-Rotor	**G**	290
9	**GTS**	**56**	**(United States) Martin Snow Racing**	**(United States) Martin Snow (United States) Melanie Snow (Netherlands) Patrick Huisman**	**Porsche 911 GT2**	**MI**	**287**
9	**GTS**	**56**	**(United States) Martin Snow Racing**	**(United States) Martin Snow (United States) Melanie Snow (Netherlands) Patrick Huisman**	**Porsche 3.6 L Turbo Flat-6**	**MI**	**287**
10	GTS	48	(Germany) Freisinger Motorsport	(Germany) Wolfgang Kaufmann (France) Michel Ligonnet (United States) Lance Stewart	Porsche 911 GT2	**D**	285
10	GTS	48	(Germany) Freisinger Motorsport	(Germany) Wolfgang Kaufmann (France) Michel Ligonnet (United States) Lance Stewart	Porsche 3.6 L Turbo Flat-6	**D**	285
11	**GT**	**23**	**(United States) Alex Job Racing**	**(United States) Kelly Collins (United States) Cort Wagner (United States) Darrly Havens**	**Porsche 911 Carrera RSR**	**Y**	**284**
11	**GT**	**23**	**(United States) Alex Job Racing**	**(United States) Kelly Collins (United States) Cort Wagner (United States) Darrly Havens**	**Porsche 3.8 L Flat-6**	**Y**	**284**
12	LMP	63	(United States) Downing Atlanta	(United States) Jim Downing (United States) Chris Ronson (United States) Steve Pelke	Kudzu DLY	**G**	281
12	LMP	63	(United States) Downing Atlanta	(United States) Jim Downing (United States) Chris Ronson (United States) Steve Pelke	Mazda R26B 2.6 L 4-Rotor	**G**	281
13	GT	22	(United States) Alex Job Racing	(United States) Randy Pobst (United States) Mike Fitzgerald (United States) David MacNeil	Porsche 911 Carrera RSR	**Y**	281
13	GT	22	(United States) Alex Job Racing	(United States) Randy Pobst (United States) Mike Fitzgerald (United States) David MacNeil	Porsche 3.8 L Flat-6	**Y**	281
14	GT	17	(United States) Aasco Performance (United States) Contemporary Motorsports	(United States) Mike Conte (Belgium) Bruno Lambert	Porsche 911 Carrera RSR	**P**	275
14	GT	17	(United States) Aasco Performance (United States) Contemporary Motorsports	(United States) Mike Conte (Belgium) Bruno Lambert	Porsche 3.8 L Flat-6	**P**	275
15	GT	33	(Germany) Gallade	(Germany) Ulrich Gallade (Germany) Ulli Richter (Germany) Karl-Heinz Wlazik	Porsche 911 Carrera RSR	?	274
15	GT	33	(Germany) Gallade	(Germany) Ulrich Gallade (Germany) Ulli Richter (Germany) Karl-Heinz Wlazik	Porsche 3.8 L Flat-6	?	274
16	GTS	61	(Germany) Konrad Motorsport	(United States) Charles Slater (United States) Peter Kitchak (Netherlands) Mike Hezemans	Porsche 911 GT2	**D**	273
16	GTS	61	(Germany) Konrad Motorsport	(United States) Charles Slater (United States) Peter Kitchak (Netherlands) Mike Hezemans	Porsche 3.6 L Turbo Flat-6	**D**	273
17 DNF	LMP	8	(United States) Transatlantic Racing	(United States) Duncan Dayton (United States) Scott Schubot (United States) Henry Camferdam	Riley & Scott Mk III	**G**	268
17 DNF	LMP	8	(United States) Transatlantic Racing	(United States) Duncan Dayton (United States) Scott Schubot (United States) Henry Camferdam	Ford 5.0 L V8	**G**	268
18	GT	07	(United States) G & W Motorsports	(United States) Steve Marshall (United States) Danny Marshall (United States) Darren Law (Canada) Sylvain Tremblay	Porsche 911 GT2 Evo	**P**	268
18	GT	07	(United States) G & W Motorsports	(United States) Steve Marshall (United States) Danny Marshall (United States) Darren Law (Canada) Sylvain Tremblay	Porsche 3.8 L Turbo Flat-6	**P**	268
19	LMP	28	(United States) Intersport Racing	(United States) Jon Field (United States) Ryan Jones (United Kingdom) Chris Goodwin	Lola B98/10	**G**	268
19	LMP	28	(United States) Intersport Racing	(United States) Jon Field (United States) Ryan Jones (United Kingdom) Chris Goodwin	Ford (Roush) 6.0 L V8	**G**	268
20	GT	54	(United States) Bell Motorsports	(United States) Stu Hayner (United States) Tony Kester (United States) Scott Neuman (United States) Matt Drendel	BMW M3	?	268
20	GT	54	(United States) Bell Motorsports	(United States) Stu Hayner (United States) Tony Kester (United States) Scott Neuman (United States) Matt Drendel	BMW 3.2 L I6	?	268
21	LMP	31	(United States) Genesis Racing	(United States) Rick Fairbanks (United States) Dave Dullum (United States) Kurt Baumann	Riley & Scott Mk III	?	267
21	LMP	31	(United States) Genesis Racing	(United States) Rick Fairbanks (United States) Dave Dullum (United States) Kurt Baumann	Ford 5.0 L V8	?	267
22	GT	03	(United States) Reiser Callas Rennsport	(United States) Grady Willingham (United States) Craig Stanton (United States) Joel Reiser	Porsche 911 Carrera RSR	**P**	262
22	GT	03	(United States) Reiser Callas Rennsport	(United States) Grady Willingham (United States) Craig Stanton (United States) Joel Reiser	Porsche 3.8 L Flat-6	**P**	262
23	GTS	3	(United States) Corvette Racing	(United States) Chris Kneifel (United States) John Paul Jr. (Canada) Ron Fellows	Chevrolet Corvette C5-R	**G**	262
23	GTS	3	(United States) Corvette Racing	(United States) Chris Kneifel (United States) John Paul Jr. (Canada) Ron Fellows	Chevrolet 6.0 L V8	**G**	262
24 DNF	GT	70	(United States) Alegra Motorsports	(United States) Scooter Gabel (United States) Carlos DeQuesada (United States) Ugo Colombo	Porsche 911 Carrera RSR	?	258
24 DNF	GT	70	(United States) Alegra Motorsports	(United States) Scooter Gabel (United States) Carlos DeQuesada (United States) Ugo Colombo	Porsche 3.8 L Flat-6	?	258
25 DNF	LMP	74	(United States) Robinson Racing	(United States) George Robinson (United States) Irv Hoerr (United States) Jack Baldwin	Riley & Scott Mk III	?	243
25 DNF	LMP	74	(United States) Robinson Racing	(United States) George Robinson (United States) Irv Hoerr (United States) Jack Baldwin	Chevrolet 6.0 L V8	?	243
26 DNF	GT	7	(United States) Prototype Technology Group	(United States) Mark Simo (United States) Brian Cunningham (United States) Johannes van Overbeek	BMW M3	**Y**	238
26 DNF	GT	7	(United States) Prototype Technology Group	(United States) Mark Simo (United States) Brian Cunningham (United States) Johannes van Overbeek	BMW 3.2 L I6	**Y**	238
27	GTS	49	(Germany) Freisinger Motorsport	(United States Virgin Islands) Brad Creger (Austria) Mandfred Jurasz (Germany) Michael Irmgratz	Porsche 911 GT2	**D**	237
27	GTS	49	(Germany) Freisinger Motorsport	(United States Virgin Islands) Brad Creger (Austria) Mandfred Jurasz (Germany) Michael Irmgratz	Porsche 3.6 L Turbo Flat-6	**D**	237
28	GTS	04	(United States) CJ Motorsport	(Canada) John Graham (United States) Davy Jones (United States) John Morton	Porsche 911 GT2	?	219
28	GTS	04	(United States) CJ Motorsport	(Canada) John Graham (United States) Davy Jones (United States) John Morton	Porsche 3.6 L Turbo Flat-6	?	219
29 DNF	LMP	16	(United States) Dyson Racing	(United States) Dorsey Schroeder (United Kingdom) Andy Wallace (United Kingdom) James Weaver	Riley & Scott Mk III	**G**	218
29 DNF	LMP	16	(United States) Dyson Racing	(United States) Dorsey Schroeder (United Kingdom) Andy Wallace (United Kingdom) James Weaver	Ford 5.0 L V8	**G**	218
30 DNF	GT	46	(United States) Team Transenergy	(United States) Sam Shalala (United States) Shareef Malnik (United States) Andre Toennis (United States) Bill Rollwitz	Porsche 911 Carrera RSR	?	206
30 DNF	GT	46	(United States) Team Transenergy	(United States) Sam Shalala (United States) Shareef Malnik (United States) Andre Toennis (United States) Bill Rollwitz	Porsche 3.8 L Flat-6	?	206
31 DNF	GT	10	(United States) Prototype Technology Group	(United States) Boris Said (United States) Peter Cunningham (Germany) Hans-Joachim Stuck	BMW M3	**Y**	200
31 DNF	GT	10	(United States) Prototype Technology Group	(United States) Boris Said (United States) Peter Cunningham (Germany) Hans-Joachim Stuck	BMW 3.2 L I6	**Y**	200
32	LMP	29	(United States) Intersport Racing	(United States) John Mirro (United States) Sam Brown (United States) Butch Brickell (United States) Andy Petery	Riley & Scott Mk III	**G**	199
32	LMP	29	(United States) Intersport Racing	(United States) John Mirro (United States) Sam Brown (United States) Butch Brickell (United States) Andy Petery	Ford 5.0 L V8	**G**	199
33 DNF	LMP	2	(United States) Panoz Motor Sports	(United States) Johnny O'Connell (Denmark) Jan Magnussen (Denmark) John Nielsen	Panoz GTR-1	**MI**	198
33 DNF	LMP	2	(United States) Panoz Motor Sports	(United States) Johnny O'Connell (Denmark) Jan Magnussen (Denmark) John Nielsen	Ford (Roush) 6.0 L V8	**MI**	198
34 DNF	GT	02	(United States) Reiser Callas Rennsport	(United States) David Murry (United Kingdom) Johnny Mowlem	Porsche 911 Carrera RSR	**P**	197
34 DNF	GT	02	(United States) Reiser Callas Rennsport	(United States) David Murry (United Kingdom) Johnny Mowlem	Porsche 3.8 L Flat-6	**P**	197
35	LMP	44	(Japan) Autoexe Motorsports	(Japan) Yojiro Terada (France) Franck Fréon	Autoexe LMP99	**Y**	195
35	LMP	44	(Japan) Autoexe Motorsports	(Japan) Yojiro Terada (France) Franck Fréon	Ford 6.0 L V8	**Y**	195
36	GT	72	(United States) Bell Motorsports	(United States) Leo Hindery (United States) Peter Baron (United States) James McCormick (United States) Gian Luigi Buitoni	BMW M3	**Y**	190
36	GT	72	(United States) Bell Motorsports	(United States) Leo Hindery (United States) Peter Baron (United States) James McCormick (United States) Gian Luigi Buitoni	BMW 3.2 L I6	**Y**	190
37 DNF	LMP	0	(Italy) Team Rafanelli SRL	(Belgium) Eric van de Poele (Belgium) David Saelens (Czech Republic) Tomáš Enge	Riley & Scott Mk III	**Y**	185
37 DNF	LMP	0	(Italy) Team Rafanelli SRL	(Belgium) Eric van de Poele (Belgium) David Saelens (Czech Republic) Tomáš Enge	Judd GV4 4.0 L V10	**Y**	185
38 DNF	GTS	4	(United States) Riley & Scott Inc.	(United States) Scott Sharp (United States) Andy Pilgrim (United States) John Heinricy	Chevrolet Corvette C5-R	**G**	157
38 DNF	GTS	4	(United States) Riley & Scott Inc.	(United States) Scott Sharp (United States) Andy Pilgrim (United States) John Heinricy	Chevrolet 6.0 L V8	**G**	157
39 DNF	GTS	83	(United States) ARBJH Development (United States) Chiefie Motorsports	(Germany) Claudia Hürtgen (Germany) Hubert Haupt (United States) Zak Brown	Porsche 911 GT2	?	149
39 DNF	GTS	83	(United States) ARBJH Development (United States) Chiefie Motorsports	(Germany) Claudia Hürtgen (Germany) Hubert Haupt (United States) Zak Brown	Porsche 3.6 L Turbo Flat-6	?	149
40 DNF	LMP	43	(Germany) BMW Motorsport (Germany) Schnitzer Motorsport	(Germany) Joachim Winkelhock (Italy) Pierluigi Martini (France) Yannick Dalmas	BMW V12 LMR	**MI**	135
40 DNF	LMP	43	(Germany) BMW Motorsport (Germany) Schnitzer Motorsport	(Germany) Joachim Winkelhock (Italy) Pierluigi Martini (France) Yannick Dalmas	BMW S70 6.0 L V12	**MI**	135
41 DNF	LMP	26	(United Kingdom) Price & Bscher	(Germany) Thomas Bscher (United Kingdom) Steve Soper (United States) Bill Auberlen	BMW V12 LM	**G**	127
41 DNF	LMP	26	(United Kingdom) Price & Bscher	(Germany) Thomas Bscher (United Kingdom) Steve Soper (United States) Bill Auberlen	BMW S70 6.0 L V12	**G**	127
42 DNF	LMP	5	(United States) Whittington Bros.	(United States) Don Whittington (United States) Dale Whittington (United States) Hurley Haywood	Riley & Scott Mk III	**G**	125
42 DNF	LMP	5	(United States) Whittington Bros.	(United States) Don Whittington (United States) Dale Whittington (United States) Hurley Haywood	Ford (Roush) 6.0 L V8	**G**	125
43 DNF	LMP	60	(United States) Kopf Precision	(United States) Kris Wilson (United States) Tim Moser	Keiler KII	**G**	122
43 DNF	LMP	60	(United States) Kopf Precision	(United States) Kris Wilson (United States) Tim Moser	Ford 5.0L V8	**G**	122
44 DNF	LMP	36	(United States) Doran Enterprises (United States) Jim Matthews Racing	(United States) Tommy Kendall (United States) Jim Matthews (United States) Mark Dismore	Ferrari 333 SP	**MI**	118
44 DNF	LMP	36	(United States) Doran Enterprises (United States) Jim Matthews Racing	(United States) Tommy Kendall (United States) Jim Matthews (United States) Mark Dismore	Ferrari F310E 4.0 L V12	**MI**	118
45 DNF	LMP	27	(United States) Doran Enterprises	(Belgium) Didier Theys (Italy) Mauro Baldi (Switzerland) Fredy Lienhard	Ferrari 333 SP	**MI**	107
45 DNF	LMP	27	(United States) Doran Enterprises	(Belgium) Didier Theys (Italy) Mauro Baldi (Switzerland) Fredy Lienhard	Ferrari F310E 4.0L V12	**MI**	107
46 DNF	LMP	1	(United States) Panoz Motor Sports	(Australia) David Brabham (France) Éric Bernard	Panoz GTR-1	**MI**	103
46 DNF	LMP	1	(United States) Panoz Motor Sports	(Australia) David Brabham (France) Éric Bernard	Ford (Roush) 6.0 L V8	**MI**	103
47 DNF	GT	39	(United States) Broadfoot Racing	(United States) Stephen Earle (United States) Todd Snyder (United States) Allan Ziegelman (United States) Chris Mitchum	Porsche 911 Carrera RSR	?	100
47 DNF	GT	39	(United States) Broadfoot Racing	(United States) Stephen Earle (United States) Todd Snyder (United States) Allan Ziegelman (United States) Chris Mitchum	Porsche 3.8 L Flat-6	?	100
48 DNF	LMP	95	(United States) TRV Motorsport	(United States) Jeret Schroeder (United States) Pete Halsmer (United States) Tom Volk (United States) Barry Waddell	Riley & Scott Mk III	**Y**	87
48 DNF	LMP	95	(United States) TRV Motorsport	(United States) Jeret Schroeder (United States) Pete Halsmer (United States) Tom Volk (United States) Barry Waddell	Chevrolet 6.0 L V8	**Y**	87
49 DNF	LMP	18	(United States) Dollahite Racing	(United States) Bill Dollahite (United States) Doc Bundy (United States) Mike Davies	Ferrari 333 SP	**P**	84
49 DNF	LMP	18	(United States) Dollahite Racing	(United States) Bill Dollahite (United States) Doc Bundy (United States) Mike Davies	Ferrari F310E 4.0 L V12	**P**	84
50 DNF	GT	73	(United States) Auto Sport South	(United States) Kevin Wheeler (United States) Jack Refenning (United States) Brady Refenning (United States) Jake Vargo	Porsche 911 Carrera RSR	?	73
50 DNF	GT	73	(United States) Auto Sport South	(United States) Kevin Wheeler (United States) Jack Refenning (United States) Brady Refenning (United States) Jake Vargo	Porsche 3.8 L Flat-6	?	73
51 DNF	GT	88	(United States) Vanderhoof Racing	(United States) Joe Varde (United States) Tim Ralston (United States) Blaise Alexander	Porsche 911 Carrera RSR	?	71
51 DNF	GT	88	(United States) Vanderhoof Racing	(United States) Joe Varde (United States) Tim Ralston (United States) Blaise Alexander	Porsche 3.8 L Flat-6	?	71
52 DNF	GTS	50	(United States) Johnson Autosport	(United States) Robert Johnson (United States) Mike Hoke (United States) Tim McGlynn	Porsche 911 Turbo	?	70
52 DNF	GTS	50	(United States) Johnson Autosport	(United States) Robert Johnson (United States) Mike Hoke (United States) Tim McGlynn	Porsche 3.6 L Turbo Flat-6	?	70
53 DNF	GTS	99	(United States) Schumacher Racing	(United States) Larry Schumacher (United States) Robert Nearn (United States) John O'Steen	Porsche 911 GT2	**MI**	65
53 DNF	GTS	99	(United States) Schumacher Racing	(United States) Larry Schumacher (United States) Robert Nearn (United States) John O'Steen	Porsche 3.6 L Turbo Flat-6	**MI**	65
54 DNF	GTS	55	(United States) Saleen/Allen Speedlab	(United States) Steve Saleen (United States) Terry Borcheller (United States) Ron Johnson (United States) Darren Law	Saleen Mustang SR	**P**	56
54 DNF	GTS	55	(United States) Saleen/Allen Speedlab	(United States) Steve Saleen (United States) Terry Borcheller (United States) Ron Johnson (United States) Darren Law	Ford 8.0 L V8	**P**	56
55 DNF	LMP	66	(Germany) Konrad Motorsport	(Austria) Franz Konrad (Netherlands) Jan Lammers (United States) Tim Hubman	Lola B98/10	**D**	48
55 DNF	LMP	66	(Germany) Konrad Motorsport	(Austria) Franz Konrad (Netherlands) Jan Lammers (United States) Tim Hubman	Lotus 3.5 L Turbo V8	**D**	48
56 DNF	GT	76	(United States) Team ARE	(United States) Peter Argetsinger (United States) Richard Polidori (Canada) John McCaig	Porsche 911 Carrera RSR	**Y**	36
56 DNF	GT	76	(United States) Team ARE	(United States) Peter Argetsinger (United States) Richard Polidori (Canada) John McCaig	Porsche 3.8 L Flat-6	**Y**	36
57 DNF	GTS	71	(United States) DM Motorsports	(United States) Arthur Pilla (United States) Bob Mazzuoccola (United States) David Kicak (United States) Mark Montgomery	Porsche 911 GT2 Evo	?	32
57 DNF	GTS	71	(United States) DM Motorsports	(United States) Arthur Pilla (United States) Bob Mazzuoccola (United States) David Kicak (United States) Mark Montgomery	Porsche 3.8 L Turbo Flat-6	?	32
58 DNF	LMP	11	(United States) Doyle-Risi Racing	(United States) Anthony Lazzaro (Italy) Max Angelelli (Belgium) Didier de Radiguès	Ferrari 333 SP	**P**	28
58 DNF	LMP	11	(United States) Doyle-Risi Racing	(United States) Anthony Lazzaro (Italy) Max Angelelli (Belgium) Didier de Radiguès	Ferrari F310E 4.0 L V12	**P**	28
DNS	GT	25	(Germany) RWS Motorsport	(Germany) Kirsten Jodexnis (Germany) Günther Blieninger (Austria) Hans-Jörg Hofer (Italy) Luca Riccitelli	Porsche 911 Carrera RSR	**MI**	-
DNS	GT	25	(Germany) RWS Motorsport	(Germany) Kirsten Jodexnis (Germany) Günther Blieninger (Austria) Hans-Jörg Hofer (Italy) Luca Riccitelli	Porsche 3.8 L Flat-6	**MI**	-
DNS	LMP	97	(United States) Team Cascadia	(United States) Shane Lewis (United States) Vic Rice (United States) Ed Zabinski	Lola B98/12	**P**	-
DNS	LMP	97	(United States) Team Cascadia	(United States) Shane Lewis (United States) Vic Rice (United States) Ed Zabinski	BMW 4.0 L V8	**P**	-

== Statistics ==
- Pole Position - #42 BMW Motorsport (J.J. Lehto) - 1:49.850
- Fastest Lap - #0 Team Rafanelli (Eric van de Poele) - 1:51.608
- Distance - 1,863.781 km (1,158.100 mi)
- Average Speed - 155.103 km/h (96.377 mph)

American Le Mans Series
Previous race: None	1999 season	Next race: 1999 Grand Prix of Atlanta
