= Bentley Speed 8 =

2001 prototype race car

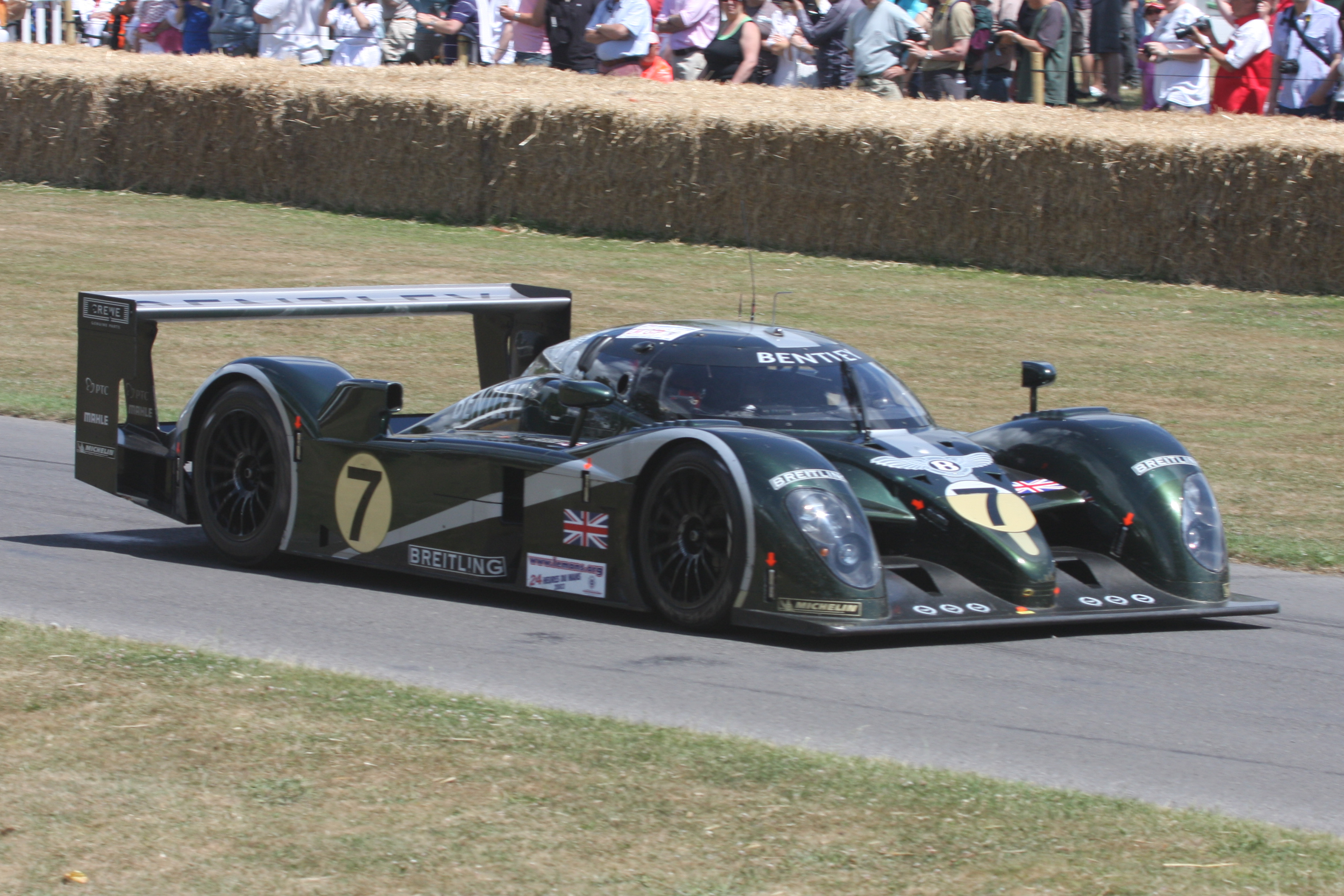
- The No. 7 Speed 8 at the 2009 Goodwood Festival of Speed
- Category: LMGTP
- Designer: Peter Elleray

Technical specifications
- Chassis: Carbon fiber and aluminium honeycomb monocoque, carbon roll hoop integrated with roof structure
- Suspension (front): Independent double wishbones, pushrods, torsion bar, telescopic dampers
- Suspension (rear): Independent double wishbones, pushrods, torsion bar, telescopic dampers
- Engine: Bentley PT 4.0 litre 90-degree V8 twin-turbo, mid-engine, longitudinally mounted
- Transmission: Bentley Xtrac 6-speed sequential manual with Megaline pneumatic actuation
- Tyres: 2001-2002: Dunlop; 2003: Michelin

Competition history
- Notable entrants: (United Kingdom) Team Bentley
- Notable drivers: (Denmark) Tom Kristensen, (United Kingdom) Guy Smith, (Italy) Rinaldo Capello, (United Kingdom) Martin Brundle, (United Kingdom) Mark Blundell, (Belgium) Eric van de Poele, (United Kingdom) Johnny Herbert, (Australia) David Brabham
- Debut: 2001 24 Hours of Le Mans
- First win: 2001 24 Hours of Le Mans
- Last win: 2003 24 Hours of Le Mans
- Last event: 2003 24 Hours of Le Mans
| Races | Wins | Poles | F/Laps |
|---|---|---|---|
| 4 | 1 (4 Class Wins) | 1 | 2 |
- Constructors' Championships: None
- Drivers' Championships: None

The Bentley Speed 8 (developed from the Bentley EXP Speed 8) is a Grand Touring Prototype race car that was designed by Bentley. It has a strong resemblance to and shares some technology with the Audi R8C, which had raced only once before Audi dropped the project to focus on the later dominant Audi R8. The EXP Speed 8 marked Bentley's return to racing after a 73-year absence.

== Development ==
All design, development and manufacturing for the Bentley was by Racing Technology Norfolk (RTN), located in Norfolk, United Kingdom, formerly TOM'S GB. The chief designer was Peter Elleray. Operations for the car were handled by veteran endurance racing driver Richard Lloyd's Audi Sport UK, operating under the title of Team Bentley.

The engine from the Audi R8, a 3.6 litre V8 with (Honeywell Turbo Technologies) turbocharger, was used as the initial powerplant in 2001. The six-speed gearbox was also not the typical Ricardo unit from the R8, but instead a custom unit developed by Xtrac. Bentley also chose to run on Dunlop tyres instead of the Michelins used by Audi.

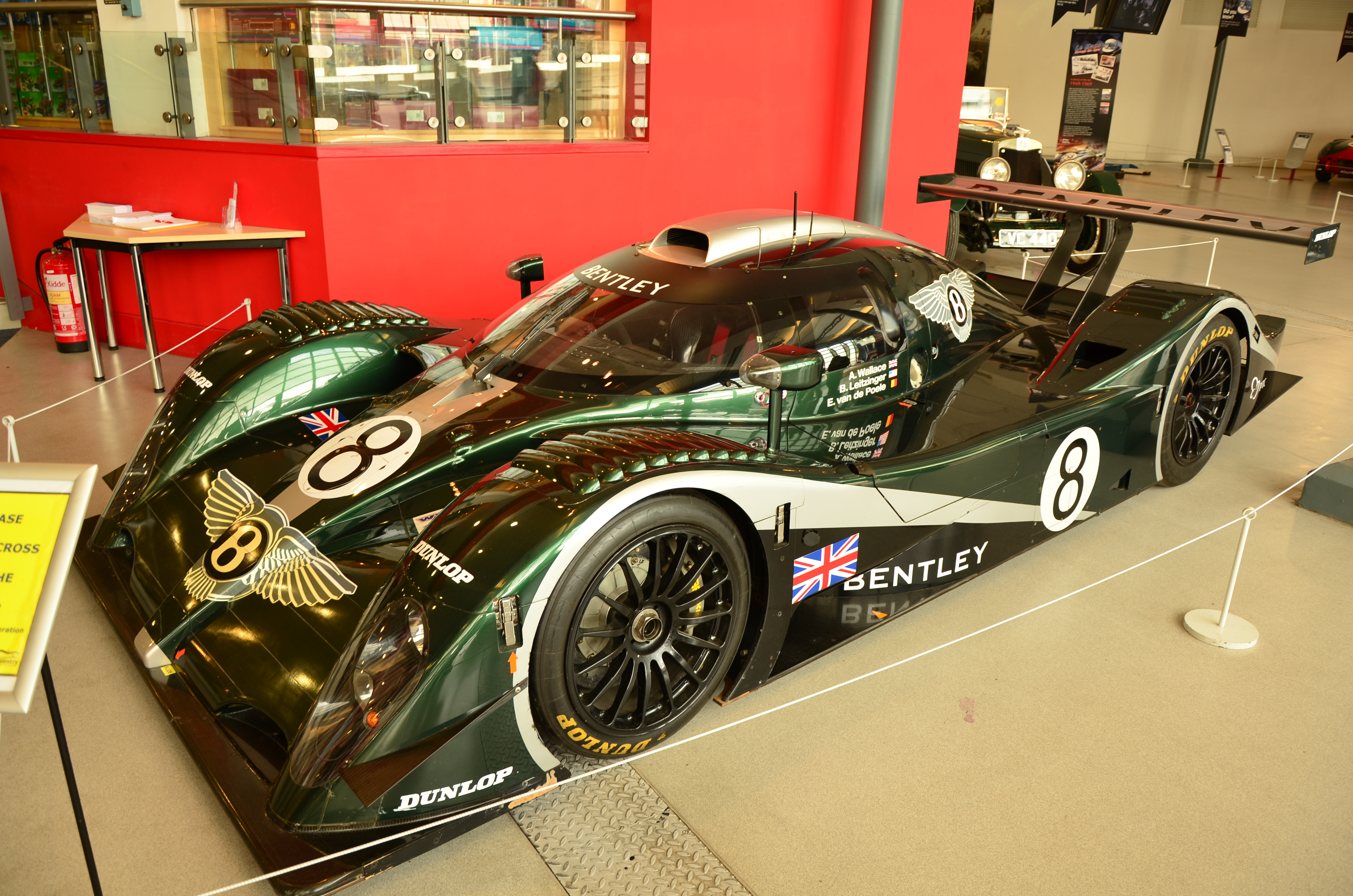
Bentley EXP Speed 8 at Coventry Transport Museum

Following its initial year of competition, the Audi-sourced V8 was modified to better suit the EXP Speed 8. This saw the engine expanded to 4.0 litres, producing approximately 600 hp. This would ultimately lead to Bentley redesigning the car for 2003, leading to the change of name to simply Speed 8. The flat front end was replaced with a raised crash box for a nose, while deep valleys ran between the nose and fenders. This required the addition of large horizontal bodywork between the nose and fenders to shroud the suspension arms of the Speed 8. The cockpit would also be tapered to allow for better airflow to the rear wing. Bentley also decided to switch to Michelin tyres for their 2003 campaign.

== Racing history ==
In 2001 Bentley returned to the famous 24 Hours of Le Mans race, after a gap of 68 years, for a planned three-year campaign with the EXP Speed 8 in the closed-cockpit LMGTP class. During its run, the Bentleys were the only cars to run in the LMGTP class. Two cars were entered, with one earning third place behind a pair of Audi R8s. The other car unfortunately retired after a strong run in the rain due to a fire which caused the driver to abandon the car. Bentley returned in 2002, using their new larger engine, now running a lone entry as a testbed for the evolved Speed 8 in 2003. The car managed fourth place, once again behind only R8s.

For 2003, Bentley decided that their new evolved Speed 8 would need competitive testing in order to prepare for an overall win at Le Mans. The pair of new cars were therefore entered in the American Le Mans Series 12 Hours of Sebring. Despite having to start at the back of the field due to a rules infraction in qualifying, the two cars quickly made their way through the field. The Bentleys were able to take third and fourth places, behind the factory and a privateer R8.

Returning to Le Mans with assistance from Joest Racing, a Bentley started from pole position. With no works Audi team participating, the two cars were able to lead nearly the entire event, with the #7 entry ahead of the #8, which had some electrical problems during the race. After 377 laps, the #7 Bentley successfully took the chequered flag, followed by the sister car two laps behind. This helped give the Volkswagen Group their fourth straight victory at Le Mans, split between the Audi and Bentley brands. It was the last win at Le Mans for a closed cockpit car until Peugeot's win in 2009 with their 908 HDi FAP.

== Aftermath ==
Following Le Mans, the Bentley program ended. Chassis no. 002-3 was last raced at Road America in 2007 prior to the 2012 RM Monterey auction.

A 2003 Bentley Speed 8 competed in 2013 Goodwood Festival of Speed.

A 2001 Bentley Speed 8 chassis no. 002-3 was sold to a Japanese collector, then it was subsequently sold to an American collector and was sold in 2012 RM Monterey auction for US$2,530,000. It remains the sole car outside Bentley ownership.

The car was awarded by Autosport as Racing Car of the Year in 2003.

The 2001 EXP Speed 8 appears as a playable vehicle in Total Immersion Racing, R: Racing Evolution, GT Racing: Motor Academy and GT Racing 2: The Real Car Experience while the 2003 Speed 8 in Gran Turismo 4, Gran Turismo 5, Gran Turismo 6, Forza Motorsport, Project CARS, GRID Legends, and Asphalt Legends.

== Racing results ==
=== 24 Hours of Le Mans ===
| Year | Entrant | # | Drivers | Class | Laps | Pos. | Class Pos. |
|---|---|---|---|---|---|---|---|
| 2001 | (United Kingdom) Team Bentley | 7 | (United Kingdom) Martin Brundle (Monaco) Stéphane Ortelli (United Kingdom) Guy Smith | LMGTP | 56 | Ret | Ret |
| 2001 | (United Kingdom) Team Bentley | 8 | (United Kingdom) Andy Wallace (United States) Butch Leitzinger (Belgium) Eric van de Poele | LMGTP | 306 | 3rd | 1st |
| 2002 | (United Kingdom) Team Bentley | 8 | (United Kingdom) Andy Wallace (Belgium) Eric van de Poele (United States) Butch Leitzinger | LMGTP | 362 | 4th | 1st |
| 2003 | (United Kingdom) Team Bentley | 7 | (Italy) Rinaldo Capello (Denmark) Tom Kristensen (United Kingdom) Guy Smith | LMGTP | 377 | 1st | 1st |
| 2003 | (United Kingdom) Team Bentley | 8 | (United Kingdom) Mark Blundell (Australia) David Brabham (United Kingdom) Johnny Herbert | LMGTP | 375 | 2nd | 2nd |

=== 12 Hours of Sebring ===
| Year | Entrant | # | Drivers | Class | Laps | Pos. | Class Pos. |
|---|---|---|---|---|---|---|---|
| 2003 | (United Kingdom) Team Bentley | 7 | (Italy) Rinaldo Capello (Denmark) Tom Kristensen (United Kingdom) Guy Smith | LMGTP | 362 | 4th | 2nd |
| 2003 | (United Kingdom) Team Bentley | 8 | (United Kingdom) Mark Blundell (Australia) David Brabham (United Kingdom) Johnny Herbert | LMGTP | 363 | 3rd | 1st |

Awards
| Preceded by Ferrari F2002 | Autosport; Racing Car Of The Year; 2003 | Succeeded by Ferrari F2004 |
