= Peter Elleray =

English engineer and race car designer

- Born: 30 June 1958 (age 68)
- Education: Collingwood College, Durham
- Occupations: Chief designer at Racing Technology Norfolk. (1998-2003), currently Design and Development Consultant
- Known for: 24 Hours of Le Mans and Formula One race car designer
- Website: http://uk.linkedin.com/pub/peter-elleray/34/254/205

Peter Elleray (born 30 June 1958) is an English engineer and race car designer particularly known for designing the Bentley Speed 8 race car. Elleray, who worked for Racing Technologies Norfolk (RTN), also designed the Audi R8C and the British Radical SR9. On 14 September 2007, his involvement was announced in the design of the WF01-Zytek for Embassy Racing, which had a best finish of 4th in its LMP2 category at the 1000 km of Nürburgring during the 2008 Le Mans Series season.

== Biography ==
Elleray attended Hutton Grammar School before earning a Bachelor of Science degree in applied mathematics from Durham University in 1979. After spending several years in the aerospace field, Elleray took a job with Tyrrell Racing in 1982 analyzing ground effect tunnels. In 1983 and 1984, he was involved with amateur racing teams before being employed as a designer and race engineer by Arrows F1. In 1999, he became Chief Designer for Bentley's prototype program.

== Designing the Bentley Speed 8 ==
According to Elleray, he had the basic ideas for the Bentley Speed 8 even before launching the design work in August 2001 with Gene Varnier, the assistant chief designer on the project. By 2003, the vehicle had evolved to accommodate a change from Dunlop tires to Michelin tires and also to adapt the front diffuser to the doored-coupe design. The Los Angeles Times praised Elleray's design as exhibiting a "kind of inexpressible British flair and beauty." The car received the Autosport Racing Car of the Year Award for 2003, the first non-F1 car for 14 years to win the award, breaking Ferrari's streak.
