= Rinaldo Capello =

Italian racing driver (born 1964)

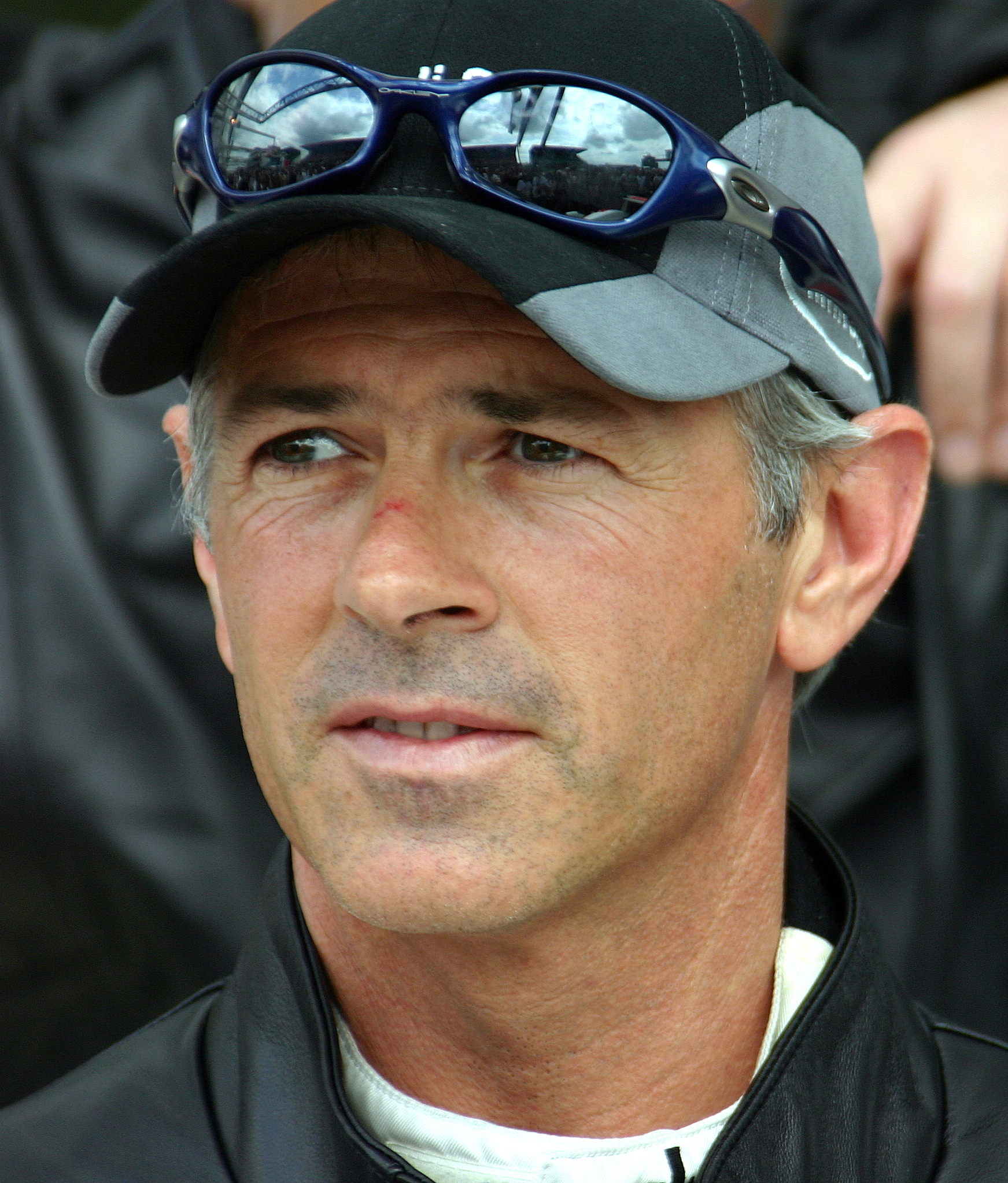
- Capello at the 2004 24 Hours of Le Mans
- Nationality: (Italy) Italian
- Born: 17 June 1964 (age 62) Asti, Italy
- Categorisation: FIA Platinum

24 Hours of Le Mans career
- Years: 1998–2004, 2006–2012
- Teams: GTC Competition, Audi Sport Joest, Team Bentley, Audi Sport Goh
- Best finish: 1st (2003, 2004, 2008)
- Class wins: 3 (2003, 2004, 2008)

Rinaldo "Dindo" Capello (born 17 June 1964) is an Italian professional racing driver. He is a three-time winner of the 24 Hours of Le Mans, with Bentley in 2003 and Audi in 2004 and 2008.

Capello is also a two-time American Le Mans Series champion, a five-time 12 Hours of Sebring winner, and the record holder for most wins at Petit Le Mans, with five. Capello also raced in DTM and the FIA World Endurance Championship.

== Career ==
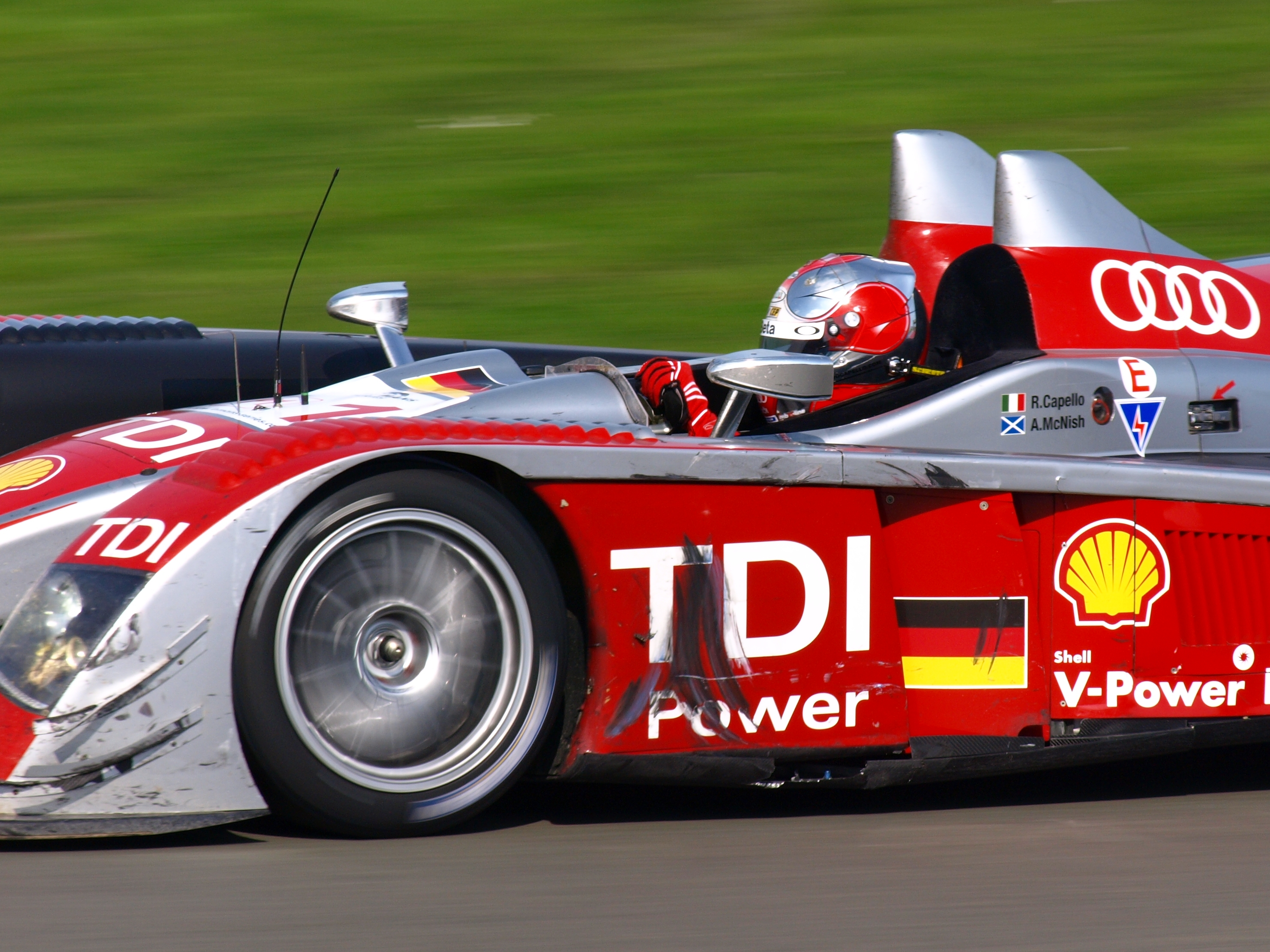
Capello driving the Audi R10 TDI at the 2008 1000 km of Silverstone

Born in Asti, Capello started his racing career in 1976, driving go-karts, but did not move into single-seaters until 1983, starting in Formula Fiat Abarth. 1990 saw Capello's first major championship victory, winning the Italian Superturismo Championship in a Volkswagen Golf. He won the championship again in 1996, but in an Audi A4 this time.

1997 saw Capello's first major endurance victory, at Vallelunga, in the Vallelunga 6 Hours, driving a Volkswagen Golf again. Capello was selected for the 2000 Le Mans race by the Audi Sport Joest team, driving the Audi R8 - the team finished in third place.

Capello was one of Audi's six drivers for its first race under Team Joest, the 1999 12 Hours of Sebring. Alongside compatriot Michele Alboreto and Stefan Johansson, they took the first podium for Audi in endurance racing, finishing third in the Audi R8R. Returning to the track in 2000, Capello took second overall, beaten only by the sister Audi R8. Capello would go on to win the race the following two years, in 2001 and 2002. Capello would return a further seven times, both with Bentley and Audi, taking four overall podiums and three wins, in 2006, 2009 and 2012. Capello currently sits second all-time in overall wins at Sebring, with five outright victories. Alongside Tom Kristensen, he is the only Audi driver to have won the race in all four generations of Audi sports prototypes. The R8, R10, R15 and R18.

Due to a shift in focus for Team Joest, Capello drove for Team Bentley in 2003. Alongside long-time teammate Kristensen and Englishman Guy Smith, they won the 24 Hours of Le Mans, giving Bentley a first victory at the French circuit in 73 years.

With the end of the Bentley project, Capello returned to Audi and more specifically to Team Goh for the 2004 24 Hours of Le Mans. Alongside Japanese driver Seiji Ara and Tom Kristensen, Capello would once again stand atop the podium as the trio beat the fellow R8's of UK Team Veloqx and Champion Racing, marking the third time in five years that Audi had finished 1-2-3 at Le Mans.

Capello would not return to Le Mans until 2006, where he finished 3rd overall in the new R10 TDI. In 2007, the trio led the race for an extended period, but an issue with the left rear wheel in the 17th hour of the race saw Capello lose control on the run down to Indianapolis, and he hit the barriers, ending their race.

2008 saw Audi return to the French classic as underdogs, due to increased competition from natives Peugeot. Heading into the race, the fastest Audi in qualifying was over five seconds slower than the pole-setting Peugeot. The first half of the race was dominated by the Peugeot trio, with the 'Lion' consistently lapping over three seconds faster than the Audi's. However, a drastic change in weather conditions and the onset of rain in the second half of the race swung the momentum in favour of Audi, and a clever pit stop/tyre strategy for Audi meant the no.2 R10 would go on to take a famous victory for the German manufacturer, and a third and final win for Capello. The 2008 race is documented in the film Truth in 24.

Capello also won the 12 Hours of Sebring in 2002 and 2012. He holds the record of most Petit Le Mans victories, with five in total, having won in 2000, 2002, 2006, 2007 and 2008, all of these victories coming for the Audi Sport North America and Team Joest squads. Capello was vice-champion of the 2000 American Le Mans Series, winning 6 races. In both 2006 and 2007, Capello finished as champion alongside Britain's Allan McNish in the Audi Sport North America–run R10. Capello is also a five-time winner of the Monza Rally Show.

Capello officially retired from prototype racing in 2012, while leading the FIA World Endurance Championship after hinting that he may not return to Le Mans in 2013. Audi's statement confirmed that Capello would continue to race in GT3 with the Audi R8 LMS Ultra.

== Racing record ==
=== Career summary ===
Series/Event	Years	Races	Wins	Podiums	Best season result
Open Wheel Racing
Formula 3 Monaco Grand Prix	1987-1988	2	0	0	
Italian Formula Three Championship	1985-1990	49	1	5	4th place (1988)
Endurance Racing
FIA World Endurance Championship	2012	3	1	3	5th place (2012)
Intercontinental Le Mans Cup	2011	4	0	1	-
24 Hours of Le Mans	1998-2012	14	3	11	1st overall (2003, 2004, 2008)
12 Hours of Sebring	1999-2012	11	6	10	1st overall (2001, 2002, 2006, 2009, 2012)
Le Mans Endurance Series	2004-2011	8	1	7	3rd place (2010)
American Le Mans Series	1999-2011	66	36	55	LMP1 Champion (2006, 2007)
GT
Porsche Supercup	1993-2003	2+	0	1	-
GT World Challenge Asia	2022	N/A	N/A	N/A	-
Italian GT Championship	2009-2015	84	6	28	3rd place (2010)
Porsche Carrera Cup Germany	1992	5	1	1	12th (1992)
Touring Cars
World Touring Car Championship	1995	2	0	0	11th place (1995)
Deutsche Tourenwagen Masters	2004-2005	12	0	0	20th place (2005)
Super Tourenwagen Cup	1994-1995	11	0	1	7th place (1994)
Superstars Championship Italy	2006-2007	3	0	1	11th place (2007)
Italian Superturismo Championship	1991-1998	110	14	50	1st place (1996)

=== Complete Italian Superturismo Championship results ===
(key) (Races in bold indicate pole position) (Races in italics indicate fastest lap)

Year	Team	Car	Class	1	2	3	4	5	6	7	8	9	10	11	12	13	14	15	16	17	18	19	20	DC	Pts
1992	Bora Racing Team	Alfa Romeo 75 Turbo Evolution	S1	MNZ; 1	MNZ; 2	MAG; 1	MAG; 2	MUG; 1 Ret	MUG; 2; 10	BIN; 1	BIN; 2	VAL; 1	VAL; 2	IMO; 1	IMO; 2	MIS; 1	MIS; 2	PER; 1	PER; 2	VAR; 1	VAR; 2	MNZ; 1	MNZ; 2	30th	1
1993	Audi Sport Europa	Volkswagen Vento		MNZ; 1 Ret	MNZ; 2 Ret	VAL; 1; 15	VAL; 2 Ret	MIS; 1	MIS; 2	MAG; 1; 14	MAG; 2 Ret	BIN; 1; 11	BIN; 2 Ret	IMO; 1; 17	IMO; 2 Ret	VAR; 1 Ret	VAR; 2; 14	MIS; 1; 14	MIS; 2; 13	PER; 1; 12	PER; 2 Ret	MUG; 1 DNS	MUG; 2 DNS	31st	0
1994	Audi Sport Italia	Audi 80 Quattro		MNZ; 1; 3	MNZ; 2; 3	VAL; 1 Ret	VAL; 2; 2	MAG; 1; 2	MAG; 2 DNS	BIN; 1 Ret	BIN; 2 Ret	MIS; 1; 9	MIS; 2; 15	VAL; 1; 3	VAL; 2; 3	MUG; 1; 8	MUG; 2; 5	PER; 1; 7	PER; 2; 3	VAR; 1; 3	VAR; 2 Ret	MUG; 1; 3	MUG; 2; 1	5th	141
1995	Audi Sport Italia	Audi A4 Quattro		MIS; 1; 3	MIS; 2; 2	**BIN**; **1**; 2	BIN; 2; 2	MNZ; 1; 4	MNZ; 2; 3	**IMO**; **1**; 2	IMO; 2; 2	MAG; 1; 2	MAG; 2; 1	MUG; 1 Ret	MUG; 2; 6	MIS; 1; 2	MIS; 2; 3	PER; 1; 3	PER; 2; 5	**VAR**; **1**; 1	**VAR**; **2**; 3	VAL; 1; 4	VAL; 2; 1	2nd	253
1996	Audi Sport Italia	Audi A4 Quattro		MUG; 1; 5	MUG; 2; 4	MAG; 1; 1	**MAG**; **2**; 1	MNZ; 1; 1	**MNZ**; **2**; 1	**BIN**; **1**; 1	**BIN**; **2**; 1	MIS; 1; 3	MIS; 2; 4	IMO; 1; 1	**IMO**; **2**; 2	PER; 1 DSQ	PER; 2; 3	PER; 1; 4	PER; 2; 4	VAR; 1; 3	VAR; 2; 3	VAL; 1; 2	VAL; 2; 3	1st	250
1997	Audi Sport Italia	Audi A4 Quattro		MNZ; 1; 2	MNZ; 2; 12	MUG; 1 Ret	MUG; 2; 12	MAG; 1; 5	MAG; 2; 3	IMO; 1; 4	IMO; 2; 2	IMO; 1; 4	IMO; 2; 3	**BIN**; **1**; 2	BIN; 2; 1	PER; 1; 5	PER; 2; 8	VAR; 1; 1	**VAR**; **2**; 1	MIS; 1; 6	MIS; 2 Ret	VAL; 1; 6	VAL; 2; 4	3rd	190
1998	Audi Sport Italia	Audi A4		BIN; 1; 6	BIN; 2; 4	IMO; 1; 6	IMO; 2; 5	MNZ; 1; 2	MNZ; 2; 3	VAR; 1; 6	VAR; 2; 5	VAL; 1; 5	VAL; 2; 2	MAG; 1 Ret	MAG; 2; 4	PER; 1; 5	PER; 2; 4	MIS; 1; 7	MIS; 2 Ret	MNZ; 1; 6	MNZ; 2 Ret	VAL; 1; 4	VAL; 2 Ret	5th	215

=== Complete Super Tourenwagen Cup results ===
(key) (Races in bold indicate pole position) (Races in italics indicate fastest lap)

Year	Team	Car	1	2	3	4	5	6	7	8	9	10	11	12	13	14	15	16	Pos.	Pts
1994	ROC Competition	Audi 80 Quattro Competition	AVU; 3	WUN	ZOL; 7	ZAN; 15	ÖST; 12	SAL; NC	SPA; 6	NÜR; 4									7th	32
1995	A.Z.K. Team Schneider	Audi A4 Quattro	ZOL; 1	ZOL; 2	SPA; 1	SPA; 2	ÖST; 1	ÖST; 2	HOC; 1	HOC; 2	NÜR; 1	NÜR; 2	SAL; 1	SAL; 2	AVU; 1 Ret	AVU; 2 Ret	NÜR; 1; 6	NÜR; 2; 19	32th	19

=== Complete 24 Hours of Le Mans results ===
Year	Team	Co-Drivers	Car	Class	Laps	Pos.	Class Pos.
1998	(United Kingdom) Gulf Team Davidoff (United Kingdom) GTC Competition	(Germany) Thomas Bscher (Italy) Emanuele Pirro	McLaren F1 GTR	GT1	228	DNF	DNF
1999	(Germany) Audi Sport Team Joest	(Italy) Michele Alboreto (France) Laurent Aïello	Audi R8R	LMP	346	4th	**3rd**
2000	(Germany) Audi Sport Team Joest	(Germany) Christian Abt (Italy) Michele Alboreto	Audi R8	LMP900	365	**3rd**	**3rd**
2001	(Germany) Audi Sport North America	(France) Laurent Aïello (Italy) Christian Pescatori	Audi R8	LMP900	320	**2nd**	**2nd**
2002	(Germany) Audi Sport North America	(United Kingdom) Johnny Herbert (Italy) Christian Pescatori	Audi R8	LMP900	374	**2nd**	**2nd**
2003	(United Kingdom) Team Bentley	(Denmark) Tom Kristensen (United Kingdom) Guy Smith	Bentley Speed 8	LMGTP	377	**1st**	**1st**
2004	Audi Sport Japan Team Goh	(Japan) Seiji Ara (Denmark) Tom Kristensen	Audi R8	LMP1	379	**1st**	**1st**
2006	(Germany) Audi Sport Team Joest	(Denmark) Tom Kristensen (United Kingdom) Allan McNish	Audi R10 TDI	LMP1	367	**3rd**	**3rd**
2007	(Germany) Audi Sport North America	(Denmark) Tom Kristensen (United Kingdom) Allan McNish	Audi R10 TDI	LMP1	262	DNF	DNF
2008	(Germany) Audi Sport North America	(Denmark) Tom Kristensen (United Kingdom) Allan McNish	Audi R10 TDI	LMP1	381	**1st**	**1st**
2009	(Germany) Audi Sport Team Joest	(Denmark) Tom Kristensen (United Kingdom) Allan McNish	Audi R15 TDI	LMP1	376	**3rd**	**3rd**
2010	(Germany) Audi Sport Team Joest	(Denmark) Tom Kristensen (United Kingdom) Allan McNish	Audi R15 TDI plus	LMP1	394	**3rd**	**3rd**
2011	(Germany) Audi Sport North America	(Denmark) Tom Kristensen (United Kingdom) Allan McNish	Audi R18 TDI	LMP1	14	DNF	DNF
2012	(Germany) Audi Sport Team Joest	(United Kingdom) Allan McNish (Denmark) Tom Kristensen	Audi R18 e-tron quattro	LMP1	377	**2nd**	**2nd**

=== Complete 12 Hours of Sebring results ===
Year	Team	Co-Drivers	Car	Class	Laps	Pos.	Class Pos.
1999	(Germany) Audi Sport Team Joest	(Italy) Michele Alboreto (Sweden) Stefan Johansson	Audi R8R	LMP	310	**3rd**	**3rd**
2000	(Germany) Audi Sport North America	(Italy) Michele Alboreto (United Kingdom) Allan McNish	Audi R8	LMP	360	**2nd**	**2nd**
2001	(Germany) Audi Sport North America	(Italy) Michele Alboreto (France) Laurent Aïello	Audi R8	LMP900	370	**1st**	**1st**
2002	(Germany) Audi Sport North America	(United Kingdom) Johnny Herbert (Italy) Christian Pescatori	Audi R8	LMP900	346	**1st**	**1st**
2003	(United Kingdom) Team Bentley	(Denmark) Tom Kristensen (United Kingdom) Guy Smith	Bentley Speed 8	LMGTP	362	4th	**2nd**
2006	(United States) Audi Sport North America	(United Kingdom) Allan McNish (Denmark) Tom Kristensen	Audi R10 TDI	LMP1	349	**1st**	**1st**
2007	(United States) Audi Sport North America	(United Kingdom) Allan McNish (Denmark) Tom Kristensen	Audi R10 TDI	LMP1	353	4th	**2nd**
2008	(United States) Audi Sport North America	(United Kingdom) Allan McNish (Denmark) Tom Kristensen	Audi R10 TDI	LMP1	351	**3rd**	**1st**
2009	(Germany) Audi Sport Team Joest	(United Kingdom) Allan McNish (Denmark) Tom Kristensen	Audi R15 TDI	LMP1	383	**1st**	**1st**
2011	(Germany) Audi Sport Team Joest	(United Kingdom) Allan McNish (Denmark) Tom Kristensen	Audi R15 TDI plus	LMP1	327	4th	4th
2012	(Germany) Audi Sport Team Joest	(United Kingdom) Allan McNish (Denmark) Tom Kristensen	Audi R18 TDI	LMP1	325	**1st**	**1st**

=== Complete Petit Le Mans results ===
Year	Team	Co-Drivers	Car	Class	Laps	Pos.	Class Pos.
2000	(Germany) Audi Sport North America	(Italy) Michele Alboreto (United Kingdom) Allan McNish	Audi R8	LMP	394	**1st**	**1st**
2001	(Germany) Audi Sport North America	(Denmark) Tom Kristensen	Audi R8	LMP	26	DNF	DNF
2002	(Germany) Audi Sport North America	(Denmark) Tom Kristensen	Audi R8	LMP	394	**1st**	**1st**
2006	(United States) Audi Sport North America	(United Kingdom) Allan McNish	Audi R10 TDI	LMP1	394	**1st**	**1st**
2007	(United States) Audi Sport North America	(United Kingdom) Allan McNish	Audi R10 TDI	LMP1	394	**1st**	**1st**
2008	(United States) Audi Sport North America	(Italy) Emanuele Pirro (United Kingdom) Allan McNish	Audi R10 TDI	LMP1	394	**1st**	**1st**
2009	(Germany) Audi Sport Team Joest	(United Kingdom) Allan McNish	Audi R15 TDI	LMP1	184	**3rd**	**3rd**
2010	(Germany) Audi Sport Team Joest	(Denmark) Tom Kristensen (United Kingdom) Allan McNish	Audi R15 TDI Plus	LMP1	392	**3rd**	**3rd**
2011	(Germany) Audi Sport Team Joest	(Denmark) Tom Kristensen (United Kingdom) Allan McNish	Audi R18 TDI	LMP1	302	DNF	DNF

=== Complete Deutsche Tourenwagen Masters results ===
(key)

Year	Team	Car	1	2	3	4	5	6	7	8	9	10	11	Pos	Points
2004	Audi Sport Team Joest	Audi A4 DTM 2004	HOC	EST	ADR	LAU	NOR	SHA; 5^{1}	NÜR	OSC	ZAN	BRN	HOC	NC	0
2005	Audi Sport Team Joest	Audi A4 DTM 2004	HOC; Ret	LAU; 11	SPA; 13	BRN; 10	OSC; 10	NOR; Ret	NÜR; 19	ZAN; Ret	LAU; 11	IST; Ret	HOC; 16	20th	0

^{1} - A non-championship one-off race was held in 2004 at the streets of Shanghai, China.

=== Complete Le Mans Series results ===
Year	Entrant	Class	Chassis	Engine	1	2	3	4	5	Rank	Points
2008	Audi Sport Team Joest	LMP1	Audi R10	Audi TDI 5.5 L Turbo V12 (Diesel)	CAT; 5	MON; 6	SPA; 4	NÜR; 4	SIL; 1	5th	27
2010	Audi Sport Team Joest	LMP1	Audi R15 TDI plus	Audi TDI 5.5 L Turbo V10 (Diesel)	CAS; 1	SPA; 3	ALG	HUN	SIL; 3	3rd	57
2011	Audi Sport Team Joest	LMP1	Audi R18 TDI	Audi TDI 3.7 L Turbo V6 (Diesel)	CAS	SPA; 3	IMO	SIL	EST	NC	0

=== Complete FIA World Endurance Championship results ===
Year	Entrant	Class	Chassis	Engine	1	2	3	4	5	6	7	8	Rank	Points
2012	Audi Sport Team Joest	LMP1	Audi R18 e-tron quattro	Audi TDI 3.7L Turbo V6 (Hybrid Diesel)	SEB; 1	**SPA**; 3	LMS; 2	SIL	SÃO	BHR	FUJ	SHA	5th	77

Sporting positions
Preceded by Emanuele Pirro	Italian Touring Car Champion; 1996	Succeeded by Emanuele Naspetti
Preceded by Frank Biela; Tom Kristensen; Emanuele Pirro	Winner of the 24 Hours of Le Mans; 2003 with: Tom Kristensen; Guy Smith	Succeeded by Seiji Ara; Tom Kristensen; Rinaldo Capello
Preceded by Tom Kristensen; Rinaldo Capello; Guy Smith	Winner of the 24 Hours of Le Mans; 2004 with: Seiji Ara; Tom Kristensen	Succeeded by J.J. Lehto; Marco Werner; Tom Kristensen
Preceded by Frank Biela; Emanuele Pirro	American Le Mans Series champion 2006-2007 with Allan McNish	Succeeded by Lucas Luhr; Marco Werner
Preceded by Frank Biela; Emanuele Pirro; Marco Werner	Winner of the 24 Hours of Le Mans; 2008 with: Allan McNish; Tom Kristensen	Succeeded by David Brabham; Marc Gené; Alexander Wurz
