= 2003 12 Hours of Sebring =

Sports car endurance race

Track map of the Sebring International Raceway

The 2003 12 Hours of Sebring was the 51st running of this event, and took place on March 15, 2003. This was also the opening race of the 2003 American Le Mans Series season.

== Official results ==
Class winners in bold. Cars failing to complete 70% of winner's distance marked as Not Classified (NC).

Pos	Class	No	Team	Drivers	Chassis	Tyre	Laps
Pos	Class	No	Team	Drivers	Engine	Tyre	Laps
1	**LMP900**	**1**	**(Germany) Infineon Team Joest**	**(Germany) Marco Werner (Germany) Frank Biela (Austria) Philipp Peter**	**Audi R8**	M	**367**
1	**LMP900**	**1**	**(Germany) Infineon Team Joest**	**(Germany) Marco Werner (Germany) Frank Biela (Austria) Philipp Peter**	**Audi 3.6 L Turbo V8**	M	**367**
2	LMP900	38	(United States) ADT Champion Racing	(Italy) Emanuele Pirro (Finland) JJ Lehto (Sweden) Stefan Johansson	Audi R8	M	367
2	LMP900	38	(United States) ADT Champion Racing	(Italy) Emanuele Pirro (Finland) JJ Lehto (Sweden) Stefan Johansson	Audi 3.6 L Turbo V8	M	367
3	**LMGTP**	**8**	**(United Kingdom) Team Bentley**	**(United Kingdom) Johnny Herbert (Australia) David Brabham (United Kingdom) Mark Blundell**	**Bentley Speed 8**	M	**363**
3	**LMGTP**	**8**	**(United Kingdom) Team Bentley**	**(United Kingdom) Johnny Herbert (Australia) David Brabham (United Kingdom) Mark Blundell**	**Bentley 4.0 L Turbo V8**	M	**363**
4	LMGTP	7	(United Kingdom) Team Bentley	(Denmark) Tom Kristensen (United Kingdom) Guy Smith (Italy) Rinaldo Capello	Bentley Speed 8	M	362
4	LMGTP	7	(United Kingdom) Team Bentley	(Denmark) Tom Kristensen (United Kingdom) Guy Smith (Italy) Rinaldo Capello	Bentley 4.0 L Turbo V8	M	362
5	LMP900	10	(United States) JML Team Panoz	(Monaco) Olivier Beretta (Italy) Max Papis (United States) Gunnar Jeannette	Panoz LMP01 Evo	M	352
5	LMP900	10	(United States) JML Team Panoz	(Monaco) Olivier Beretta (Italy) Max Papis (United States) Gunnar Jeannette	Élan 6L8 6.0 L V8	M	352
6	LMP900	9	(United Kingdom) Audi Sport UK	(Finland) Mika Salo (United Kingdom) Jonny Kane (United Kingdom) Perry McCarthy	Audi R8	M	351
6	LMP900	9	(United Kingdom) Audi Sport UK	(Finland) Mika Salo (United Kingdom) Jonny Kane (United Kingdom) Perry McCarthy	Audi 3.6 L Turbo V8	M	351
7	LMP900	27	(United States) Doran Lista Racing	(Belgium) Didier Theys (Belgium) Eric van de Poele (Switzerland) Fredy Lienhard	Dallara SP1	M	336
7	LMP900	27	(United States) Doran Lista Racing	(Belgium) Didier Theys (Belgium) Eric van de Poele (Switzerland) Fredy Lienhard	Judd GV4 4.0 L V10	M	336
8	**GTS**	**3**	**(United States) Corvette Racing**	**(Canada) Ron Fellows (United States) Johnny O'Connell (France) Franck Fréon**	**Chevrolet Corvette C5-R**	G	**332**
8	**GTS**	**3**	**(United States) Corvette Racing**	**(Canada) Ron Fellows (United States) Johnny O'Connell (France) Franck Fréon**	**Chevrolet LS7r 7.0 L V8**	G	**332**
9	LMP900	11	(United States) JML Team Panoz	(Canada) Scott Maxwell (Canada) John Graham (Switzerland) Benjamin Leuenberger	Panoz LMP01 Evo	M	324
9	LMP900	11	(United States) JML Team Panoz	(Canada) Scott Maxwell (Canada) John Graham (Switzerland) Benjamin Leuenberger	Élan 6L8 6.0 L V8	M	324
10	**GT**	**23**	**(United States) Alex Job Racing**	**(Germany) Lucas Luhr (Germany) Sascha Maassen**	**Porsche 911 GT3-RS**	M	**320**
10	**GT**	**23**	**(United States) Alex Job Racing**	**(Germany) Lucas Luhr (Germany) Sascha Maassen**	**Porsche 3.6 L Flat-6**	M	**320**
11	GT	31	(United States) White Lightning Racing	(United Kingdom) Johnny Mowlem (Sweden) Niclas Jönsson (United States) Craig Stanton	Porsche 911 GT3-RSR	M	319
11	GT	31	(United States) White Lightning Racing	(United Kingdom) Johnny Mowlem (Sweden) Niclas Jönsson (United States) Craig Stanton	Porsche 3.6 L Flat-6	M	319
12	LMP900	12	(United States) American Spirit Racing	(United States) Michael Lewis (United States) Tomy Drissi (United States) Guy Cosmo	Riley & Scott Mk III C	D	318
12	LMP900	12	(United States) American Spirit Racing	(United States) Michael Lewis (United States) Tomy Drissi (United States) Guy Cosmo	Lincoln (Élan) 5.0 L V8	D	318
13	GTS	80	(United Kingdom) Veloqx Prodrive Racing	(United Kingdom) Darren Turner (United Kingdom) Anthony Davidson (United Kingdom) Kelvin Burt	Ferrari 550-GTS Maranello	M	316
13	GTS	80	(United Kingdom) Veloqx Prodrive Racing	(United Kingdom) Darren Turner (United Kingdom) Anthony Davidson (United Kingdom) Kelvin Burt	Ferrari 5.9 L V12	M	316
14	GT	53	(Germany) Seikel Motorsport	(Italy) Alex Caffi (Italy) Gabrio Rosa (Switzerland) Andrea Chiesa	Porsche 911 GT3-RS	Y	312
14	GT	53	(Germany) Seikel Motorsport	(Italy) Alex Caffi (Italy) Gabrio Rosa (Switzerland) Andrea Chiesa	Porsche 3.6 L Flat-6	Y	312
15	GT	28	(United States) JMB Racing USA	(France) Stéphane Grégoire (Italy) Fabio Babini (Italy) Christian Pescatori	Ferrari 360 Modena GTC	P	311
15	GT	28	(United States) JMB Racing USA	(France) Stéphane Grégoire (Italy) Fabio Babini (Italy) Christian Pescatori	Ferrari 3.6 L V8	P	311
16	LMP900	77	(United Kingdom) Taurus Sports Racing	(United Kingdom) Phil Andrews (United Kingdom) Justin Keen (United States) Larry Oberto	Lola B2K/10	D	307
16	LMP900	77	(United Kingdom) Taurus Sports Racing	(United Kingdom) Phil Andrews (United Kingdom) Justin Keen (United States) Larry Oberto	Judd GV4 4.0 L V10	D	307
17	GT	24	(United States) Alex Job Racing	(Germany) Jörg Bergmeister (Germany) Timo Bernhard	Porsche 911 GT3-RS	M	307
17	GT	24	(United States) Alex Job Racing	(Germany) Jörg Bergmeister (Germany) Timo Bernhard	Porsche 3.6 L Flat-6	M	307
18	**LMP675**	**20**	**(United States) Dyson Racing**	**(United States) Chris Dyson (United States) Chad Block (Belgium) Didier de Radiguès**	**MG-Lola EX257**	G	**306**
18	**LMP675**	**20**	**(United States) Dyson Racing**	**(United States) Chris Dyson (United States) Chad Block (Belgium) Didier de Radiguès**	**MG (AER) XP20 2.0 L Turbo I4**	G	**306**
19	GT	68	(United States) The Racer's Group	(United States) Cort Wagner (United States) Marc Bunting (United States) Chris Gleason	Porsche 911 GT3-RS	M	299
19	GT	68	(United States) The Racer's Group	(United States) Cort Wagner (United States) Marc Bunting (United States) Chris Gleason	Porsche 3.6 L Flat-6	M	299
20	GT	41	(United Kingdom) DeWALT Racesport Salisbury	(United Kingdom) Rob Barff (United Kingdom) Richard Hay (United Kingdom) Richard Stanton	TVR Tuscan T400R	D	297
20	GT	41	(United Kingdom) DeWALT Racesport Salisbury	(United Kingdom) Rob Barff (United Kingdom) Richard Hay (United Kingdom) Richard Stanton	TVR Speed Six 4.0 L I6	D	297
21	GT	66	(United States) The Racer's Group	(United States) Kevin Buckler (United States) Jim Pace (Chile) Eliseo Salazar	Porsche 911 GT3-RS	M	293
21	GT	66	(United States) The Racer's Group	(United States) Kevin Buckler (United States) Jim Pace (Chile) Eliseo Salazar	Porsche 3.6 L Flat-6	M	293
22	GT	42	(United States) Orbit Racing	(United States) Joe Policastro (United States) Joe Policastro, Jr. (United States) Mike Fitzgerald	Porsche 911 GT3-RS	M	292
22	GT	42	(United States) Orbit Racing	(United States) Joe Policastro (United States) Joe Policastro, Jr. (United States) Mike Fitzgerald	Porsche 3.6 L Flat-6	M	292
23	GT	33	(United States) ZIP Racing	(United States) Andy Lally (United States) Spencer Pumpelly (United States) Steven Ivankovich	Porsche 911 GT3-RS	D	290
23	GT	33	(United States) ZIP Racing	(United States) Andy Lally (United States) Spencer Pumpelly (United States) Steven Ivankovich	Porsche 3.6 L Flat-6	D	290
24	GT	67	(United States) The Racer's Group	(United States) Michael Schrom (Germany) Pierre Ehret (United States) Vic Rice	Porsche 911 GT3-RS	M	288
24	GT	67	(United States) The Racer's Group	(United States) Michael Schrom (Germany) Pierre Ehret (United States) Vic Rice	Porsche 3.6 L Flat-6	M	288
25 DNF	LMP900	36	(United States) Jim Matthews Racing	(United States) Jim Matthews (Belgium) Marc Goossens (Denmark) Jan Magnussen	Riley & Scott Mk III C	M	284
25 DNF	LMP900	36	(United States) Jim Matthews Racing	(United States) Jim Matthews (Belgium) Marc Goossens (Denmark) Jan Magnussen	Ford (Yates) 6.0 L V8	M	284
26 DNF	GTS	4	(United States) Corvette Racing	(United States) Kelly Collins (United Kingdom) Andy Pilgrim (United Kingdom) Oliver Gavin	Chevrolet Corvette C5-R	G	283
26 DNF	GTS	4	(United States) Corvette Racing	(United States) Kelly Collins (United Kingdom) Andy Pilgrim (United Kingdom) Oliver Gavin	Chevrolet LS7r 7.0 L V8	G	283
27	GT	29	(United States) JMB Racing USA	(United States) Stephen Earle (Italy) Andrea Garbagnati (Italy) Ludovico Manfredi	Ferrari 360 Modena GTC	P	283
27	GT	29	(United States) JMB Racing USA	(United States) Stephen Earle (Italy) Andrea Garbagnati (Italy) Ludovico Manfredi	Ferrari 3.6 L V8	P	283
28 DNF	GTS	71	(United States) Carsport America	(United States) Tom Weickardt (United States) Jeff Altenberg (France) Jean-Philippe Belloc	Dodge Viper GTS-R	P	280
28 DNF	GTS	71	(United States) Carsport America	(United States) Tom Weickardt (United States) Jeff Altenberg (France) Jean-Philippe Belloc	Dodge 8.0 L V10	P	280
29	GT	52	(Germany) Seikel Motorsport	(United States) Philip Collin (United States) John Lloyd (Canada) David Shep	Porsche 911 GT3-RS	Y	278
29	GT	52	(Germany) Seikel Motorsport	(United States) Philip Collin (United States) John Lloyd (Canada) David Shep	Porsche 3.6 L Flat-6	Y	278
30	LMP675	37	(United States) Intersport Racing	(United States) Jon Field (United States) Duncan Dayton (United States) Mike Durand	MG-Lola EX257	G	266
30	LMP675	37	(United States) Intersport Racing	(United States) Jon Field (United States) Duncan Dayton (United States) Mike Durand	MG (AER) XP20 2.0 L Turbo I4	G	266
31 DNF	GT	78	(Germany) T2M Motorsport	(United States) Derek Clark (United States) Chip Vance (France) Georges Forgeois	Porsche 911 GT3-R	D	263
31 DNF	GT	78	(Germany) T2M Motorsport	(United States) Derek Clark (United States) Chip Vance (France) Georges Forgeois	Porsche 3.6 L Flat-6	D	263
32 NC	GTS	2	(Germany) Konrad Motorsport	(Austria) Franz Konrad (United Kingdom) Robert Nearn (Switzerland) Toni Seiler	Saleen S7-R	D	249
32 NC	GTS	2	(Germany) Konrad Motorsport	(Austria) Franz Konrad (United Kingdom) Robert Nearn (Switzerland) Toni Seiler	Ford 7.0 L V8	D	249
33 DNF	GTS	88	(United Kingdom) Veloqx Prodrive Racing	(Czech Republic) Tomáš Enge (Netherlands) Peter Kox (United Kingdom) Jamie Davies	Ferrari 550-GTS Maranello	M	245
33 DNF	GTS	88	(United Kingdom) Veloqx Prodrive Racing	(Czech Republic) Tomáš Enge (Netherlands) Peter Kox (United Kingdom) Jamie Davies	Ferrari 5.9 L V12	M	245
34 DNF	GT	34	(United States) Risi Competizione	(United Kingdom) Marino Franchitti (United Kingdom) Kevin McGarrity	Ferrari 360 Modena GTC	M	243
34 DNF	GT	34	(United States) Risi Competizione	(United Kingdom) Marino Franchitti (United Kingdom) Kevin McGarrity	Ferrari 3.6 L V8	M	243
35 NC	GT	61	(United Kingdom) P.K. Sport	(United Kingdom) Ian Donaldson (United Kingdom) Bart Hayden (United Kingdom) Gregor Fisken	Porsche 911 GT3-R	P	240
35 NC	GT	61	(United Kingdom) P.K. Sport	(United Kingdom) Ian Donaldson (United Kingdom) Bart Hayden (United Kingdom) Gregor Fisken	Porsche 3.6 L Flat-6	P	240
36 DNF	GT	63	(United States) ACEMCO Motorsports	(United States) B.J. Zacharias (United States) Andrew Davis (United States) Shane Lewis	Ferrari 360 Modena GTC	Y	233
36 DNF	GT	63	(United States) ACEMCO Motorsports	(United States) B.J. Zacharias (United States) Andrew Davis (United States) Shane Lewis	Ferrari 3.6 L V8	Y	233
37 DNF	GT	40	(United States) Alegra Motorsports	(United States) Boris Said (United States) Catersby Jones (United States) Carlos DeQuesada	BMW M3	Y	141
37 DNF	GT	40	(United States) Alegra Motorsports	(United States) Boris Said (United States) Catersby Jones (United States) Carlos DeQuesada	BMW 3.2 L I6	Y	141
38 DNF	GT	03	(United States) Hyper Sport	(United States) Joe Foster (United States) Brad Nyberg (United States) Rick Skelton	Porsche 911 GT3-RS	P	125
38 DNF	GT	03	(United States) Hyper Sport	(United States) Joe Foster (United States) Brad Nyberg (United States) Rick Skelton	Porsche 3.6L Flat-6	P	125
39 DNF	GT	48	(Netherlands) Spyker Squadron	(Germany) Norman Simon (Netherlands) Hans Hugenholtz (Belgium) Patrick van Schoote	Spyker C8 Double-12R	D	103
39 DNF	GT	48	(Netherlands) Spyker Squadron	(Germany) Norman Simon (Netherlands) Hans Hugenholtz (Belgium) Patrick van Schoote	BMW (Mader) 4.0 L V8	D	103
40 DNF	GTS	83	(United Kingdom) Graham Nash Motorsport	(Brazil) Thomas Erdos (Portugal) Pedro Chaves (United Kingdom) Gavin Pickering	Saleen S7-R	D	97
40 DNF	GTS	83	(United Kingdom) Graham Nash Motorsport	(Brazil) Thomas Erdos (Portugal) Pedro Chaves (United Kingdom) Gavin Pickering	Ford 7.0 L V8	D	97
41 DNF	GT	60	(United Kingdom) P.K. Sport	(United Kingdom) Robin Liddell (United Kingdom) Piers Masarati (United Kingdom) David Warnock	Porsche 911 GT3-R	P	74
41 DNF	GT	60	(United Kingdom) P.K. Sport	(United Kingdom) Robin Liddell (United Kingdom) Piers Masarati (United Kingdom) David Warnock	Porsche 3.6 L Flat-6	P	74
42 DNF	LMP675	15	(United Kingdom) RN Motorsports	(Japan) Hayanari Shimoda (Denmark) John Nielsen	DBA4 03S	D	73
42 DNF	LMP675	15	(United Kingdom) RN Motorsports	(Japan) Hayanari Shimoda (Denmark) John Nielsen	Zytek ZG348 3.4 L V8	D	73
43 DNF	LMP900	87	(United States) Sezio Florida Racing Team	(United States) Allen Ziegelman (France) Patrice Roussel (United Kingdom) Ian James	Norma M2000	D	71
43 DNF	LMP900	87	(United States) Sezio Florida Racing Team	(United States) Allen Ziegelman (France) Patrice Roussel (United Kingdom) Ian James	Ford (Kinetic) 6.0 L V8	D	71
44 DNF	GT	07	(Germany) RWS-Yukos Motorsport	(Austria) Walter Lechner, Jr. (France) Stéphane Daoudi (Russia) Nikolai Fomenko	Porsche 911 GT3-R	P	70
44 DNF	GT	07	(Germany) RWS-Yukos Motorsport	(Austria) Walter Lechner, Jr. (France) Stéphane Daoudi (Russia) Nikolai Fomenko	Porsche 3.6 L Flat-6	P	70
45 DNF	GTS	0	(Italy) Team Olive Garden	(Italy) Emanuele Naspetti (Italy) Domenico Schiattarella (Venezuela) Johnny Cecotto	Ferrari 550 Maranello	P	59
45 DNF	GTS	0	(Italy) Team Olive Garden	(Italy) Emanuele Naspetti (Italy) Domenico Schiattarella (Venezuela) Johnny Cecotto	Ferrari 6.0 L V12	P	59
46 DNF	GT	79	(United States) J-3 Racing	(United States) David Murry (United States) Brian Cunningham (United States) Justin Jackson	Porsche 911 GT3-RS	M	57
46 DNF	GT	79	(United States) J-3 Racing	(United States) David Murry (United States) Brian Cunningham (United States) Justin Jackson	Porsche 3.6 L Flat-6	M	57
47 DNF	LMP675	18	(United States) Marshall Cooke Racing	(United States) Jason Workman (Canada) Melanie Paterson (United Kingdom) Ben Devlin	Lola B2K/40	P	50
47 DNF	LMP675	18	(United States) Marshall Cooke Racing	(United States) Jason Workman (Canada) Melanie Paterson (United Kingdom) Ben Devlin	Ford (Millington) 2.0 L Turbo I4	P	50
48 DNF	GT	35	(United States) Risi Competizione	(United States) Terry Borcheller (United States) Anthony Lazzaro (Germany) Ralf Kelleners	Ferrari 360 Modena GTC	M	39
48 DNF	GT	35	(United States) Risi Competizione	(United States) Terry Borcheller (United States) Anthony Lazzaro (Germany) Ralf Kelleners	Ferrari 3.6 L V8	M	39
49 DNF	LMP675	16	(United States) Dyson Racing	(United States) Butch Leitzinger (United Kingdom) Andy Wallace (United Kingdom) James Weaver	MG-Lola EX257	G	39
49 DNF	LMP675	16	(United States) Dyson Racing	(United States) Butch Leitzinger (United Kingdom) Andy Wallace (United Kingdom) James Weaver	MG (AER) XP20 2.0 L Turbo I4	G	39
50 DNF	LMP675	56	(United States) Team Bucknum Racing	(United States) Jeff Bucknum (United States) Bryan Willman (United States) Chris McMurry	Pilbeam MP91	D	37
50 DNF	LMP675	56	(United States) Team Bucknum Racing	(United States) Jeff Bucknum (United States) Bryan Willman (United States) Chris McMurry	Willman (JPX) 3.4 L V6	D	37
51 DNF	GT	43	(United States) Orbit Racing	(United States) Leo Hindery (United States) Peter Baron (Germany) Marc Lieb	Porsche 911 GT3-RS	M	26
51 DNF	GT	43	(United States) Orbit Racing	(United States) Leo Hindery (United States) Peter Baron (Germany) Marc Lieb	Porsche 3.6 L Flat-6	M	26
52 DNF	LMP900	01	(United Kingdom) Team Nasamax	(United States) Bryan Herta (Canada) Robbie Stirling (France) Romain Dumas	Reynard 01Q	G	14
52 DNF	LMP900	01	(United Kingdom) Team Nasamax	(United States) Bryan Herta (Canada) Robbie Stirling (France) Romain Dumas	Cosworth XDE 2.7 L Turbo V8 (Bio-ethanol)	G	14
53 DNF	LMP900	6	(United Kingdom) Lister Storm Racing	(United Kingdom) Jamie Campbell-Walter (United Kingdom) Ian MacKellar	Lister Storm LMP	D	10
53 DNF	LMP900	6	(United Kingdom) Lister Storm Racing	(United Kingdom) Jamie Campbell-Walter (United Kingdom) Ian MacKellar	Chevrolet LS1 6.0 L V8	D	10
54 DNF	GTS	17	(United States) Carsport America	(Netherlands) Mike Hezemans (Belgium) Anthony Kumpen	Pagani Zonda GR	P	6
54 DNF	GTS	17	(United States) Carsport America	(Netherlands) Mike Hezemans (Belgium) Anthony Kumpen	Mercedes-AMG 6.3 L V12	P	6
DSQ^{†}	LMP900	30	(United States) Intersport Racing	(United States) Clint Field (United States) Rick Sutherland (United States) John Macaluso	Lola B2K/10	G	196
DSQ^{†}	LMP900	30	(United States) Intersport Racing	(United States) Clint Field (United States) Rick Sutherland (United States) John Macaluso	Judd GV4 4.0 L V10	G	196

† - #30 was disqualified for receiving outside assistance while still on the race course.

== Statistics ==
- Pole Position - #1 Infineon Team Joest - 1:48.826
  - Note: #8 Team Bentley was originally on pole (1:48.108), but failed post-qualifying inspection.
- Fastest Lap - #7 Team Bentley - 1:49.521
- Distance - 1,357.9 miles (2,185.3 km)
- Average Speed - 113.097 mph (182.012 km/h)

American Le Mans Series
Previous race: None	2003 season	Next race: 2003 Grand Prix of Atlanta
