= Audi R8C =

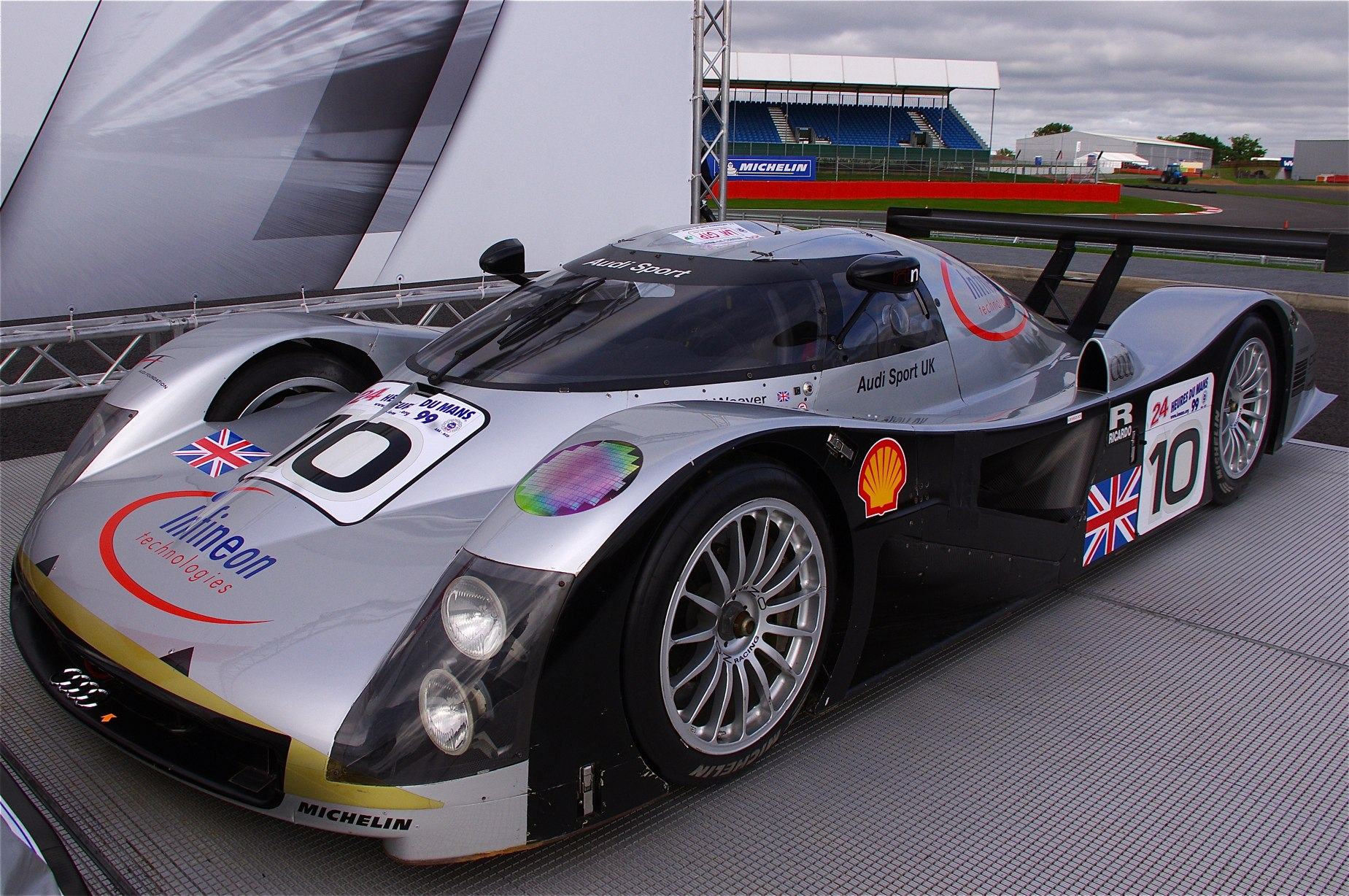
- The No. 10 R8C on display at the 2011 6 Hours of Silverstone
- Category: LMGTP
- Constructor: Audi (RTN)
- Designer: Peter Elleray

Technical specifications
- Engine: Audi 3.6-litre 90-degree V8 twin-turbo,
- Transmission: Ricardo 6-speed sequential
- Fuel: Shell
- Tyres: Michelin

Competition history
- Notable entrants: (United Kingdom) Audi Sport UK
- Notable drivers: (Sweden) Stefan Johansson (Monaco) Stéphane Ortelli (Germany) Christian Abt (United Kingdom) James Weaver (United Kingdom) Andy Wallace (United Kingdom) Perry McCarthy
- Debut: 1999 24 Hours of Le Mans
- Last event: 1999 24 Hours of Le Mans
Races	Wins
1	0

The Audi R8C is a Le Mans Prototype racecar that was built by Audi and designed by Peter Elleray to compete in the 1999 24 Hours of Le Mans under the LMGTP category. It was developed alongside the open Audi R8R LMP category spyder, prior to being replaced by the all-new Audi R8 in 2000.

== Development ==
In 1998, when Audi announced its intention to enter the 1999 24 Hours of Le Mans, the plan was to enter only an open-cockpit prototype, known as the Audi R8R. However, following the dominant performance of GT1-class cars in the 1998 24 Hours of Le Mans, the race organizers, the Automobile Club de l'Ouest (ACO), had faced a problem. The GT1 cars had transformed over the past few years from race versions of supercars, as the rules intended, into purpose-built closed cockpit prototypes where one car was modified to be a street legal "production" showcar as almost an after thought. Though these cars were within the GT1 rules, they were not at all what the ACO had intended for the category.

Consequently, the ACO modified classification rules for 1999. In GT ranks, the GT1 category was replaced with the GTS category. The GTS class was far more restrictive on modifications, appearance and meeting a set number of production cars than GT1, but still allowed manufacturers to race sportscars that may otherwise be uncompetitive without major modification. Additionally, in order to address advances and popularity of old GT1 class cars, the ACO created the LMGTP category. The LMGTP category would be for closed cockpit prototypes, which gave a place for the previous GT1 cars, but, under prototype rules now, also freed from certain "production car" restrictions that they had been under in the GT1 category. Under these new rules, LMGTP closed-cockpit cars, with better aerodynamics than open LMP cars, and freed of the GT1 restrictions, had the very real potential of dominating the 1999 24 Hours of Le Mans.

Toyota and Mercedes both committed to either modifying existing cars or building brand new cars to take advantage of the new rules. With these developments in mind, Audi decided that it should invest in this new LMGTP class along with the R8R LMP program, hence the appearance of the R8C project.

Unlike the R8R, for which Audi had turned to Dallara, they instead looked to Racing Technology Norfolk (RTN) to design and develop the new R8C. RTN assigned Peter Elleray the task, while Tony Southgate consulted on the project.

The R8C and R8R both use the 600 hp (450 kW) 3.6-litre twin-turbocharged V8 engine, but are radically different aerodynamically. While the R8R has a large number of vents placed on the nose, most of the intakes and air exits on the R8C are placed on the sides. The R8C also has thinner wheel arches, partially due to LMGTP rules, at the time, that stipulate the LMGTP cars use thinner tires than the LMP cars in order to off-set the better aerodynamic efficiency, and thus higher top speeds, of the LMGTP cars. Additionally, using a styling feature borrowed from the Toyota GT-One, the inside of the front wheel arches of the R8C are open, so that air does not build up in the wheel wells, and to benefit brake cooling. Like most, if not all other LMGTPs of the time, the cockpit is long, gradually sloping to maximise aerodynamic efficiency. Uniquely, though, the minimum roof height was achieved with the use of raised humps above the driver's position, so that there is a trough down the center of the roof to allow for more air to reach the rear wing. The rear of the car features a boxy, blunt tail that was developed from the improved R8R, however, it is longer in order to better maximize the R8C's aerodynamics.

== Racing history ==
Unlike the R8R, which was able to complete a full testing program, the R8C was completed late and had very little test time prior to the 24 Hours of Le Mans group test in May. Consequently, the cars suffered numerous setbacks and lacked pace both compared to the R8Rs and overall. The R8Cs were capable of hitting speeds upward of 350 km/h (217 mph) on the Mulsanne Straight, but they lacked handling stability compared to other cars and hence lacked overall speed across a full lap. While the R8Rs managed the 8th and 11th fastest times, the R8Cs could only manage the 22nd and 28th fastest times. Many of the R8Cs' problems stemmed from aerodynamic instability, which, besides creating handling difficulties, was causing a build-up of air underneath the engine cover. This issue caused the R8Cs to lose their rear engine covers on several occasions while at speed.

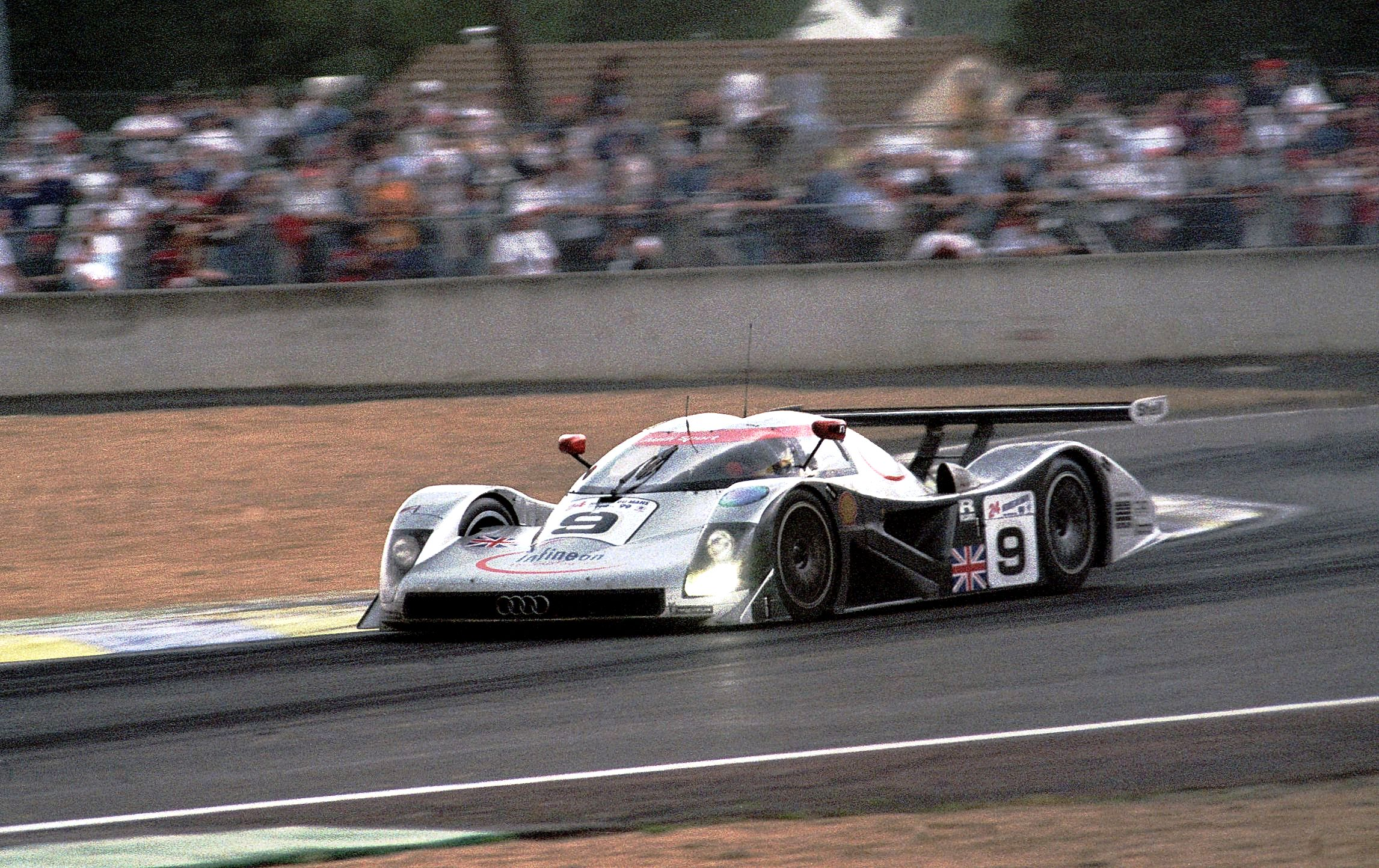
The No. 9 R8C at the 1999 24 Hours of Le Mans.

Audi Sport UK was unable to significantly improve the R8Cs in the month between the test and the actual race. Qualifying for the 24 Hours of Le Mans produced very similar results to the test in the case of the R8C. Car no. 10 only qualified 20th, while car no. 9 was even further behind in 23rd. Conversely, the R8Rs were able to qualify 9th and 11th. During the race, both the R8Rs and R8Cs suffered numerous gearbox difficulties, but Audi Sport Team Joest was better able to cope with the issues on the R8Rs compared to Audi Sport UK with the R8Cs. Car no. 9 was forced to drop out of the race after just 55 laps with gearbox woes, while the car no. 10 succumbed to gearbox failure after the midpoint of the race, on lap 198. In contrast, both R8Rs finished the race despite their gearbox difficulties, finishing in 3rd and 4th place, 5 and 19 laps behind the winning car respectively.

After Le Mans, Audi decided it would concentrate on only one of the two projects going forward. The dismal performance of the R8C, combined with the exodus of all the other manufacturers from the LMGTP class, led Audi to focus on developing the R8R. This would lead to the R8, which would win Le Mans a total of 5 times between 2000 and 2005.

However, Audi would return to the LMGTP class in 2001 with the Bentley EXP Speed 8. Although similar visually to the R8C, the Bentley EXP Speed 8 was a fresh design other than the Audi engine which powered it and the aerodynamic lessons learned from the R8C. In 2003, the Bentley Speed 8, the evolution of the EXP Speed 8, and, somewhat the spiritual successor of the R8C, won Le Mans. This made the Speed 8 the only car to beat the Audi R8 - the direct evolution of the Audi R8R - at the 24 Hours of Le Mans.

Only two R8Cs were ever built, chassis No. 101 (car no. 10) and No. 102 (car no. 9). Both were raced by Richard Lloyd's Audi Sport UK. The 1999 24 Hours of Le Mans was the only competition in which the R8Cs were entered .

Audi would return to a closed-cockpit LMP1 car for 2011 24 Hours of Le Mans in order to best take advantage of new regulations provided by the ACO. The car, the R18, would win the race.

== See also ==
- Audi R8R
- Audi R8 (LMP)
- Bentley Speed 8
