= Audi R8R =

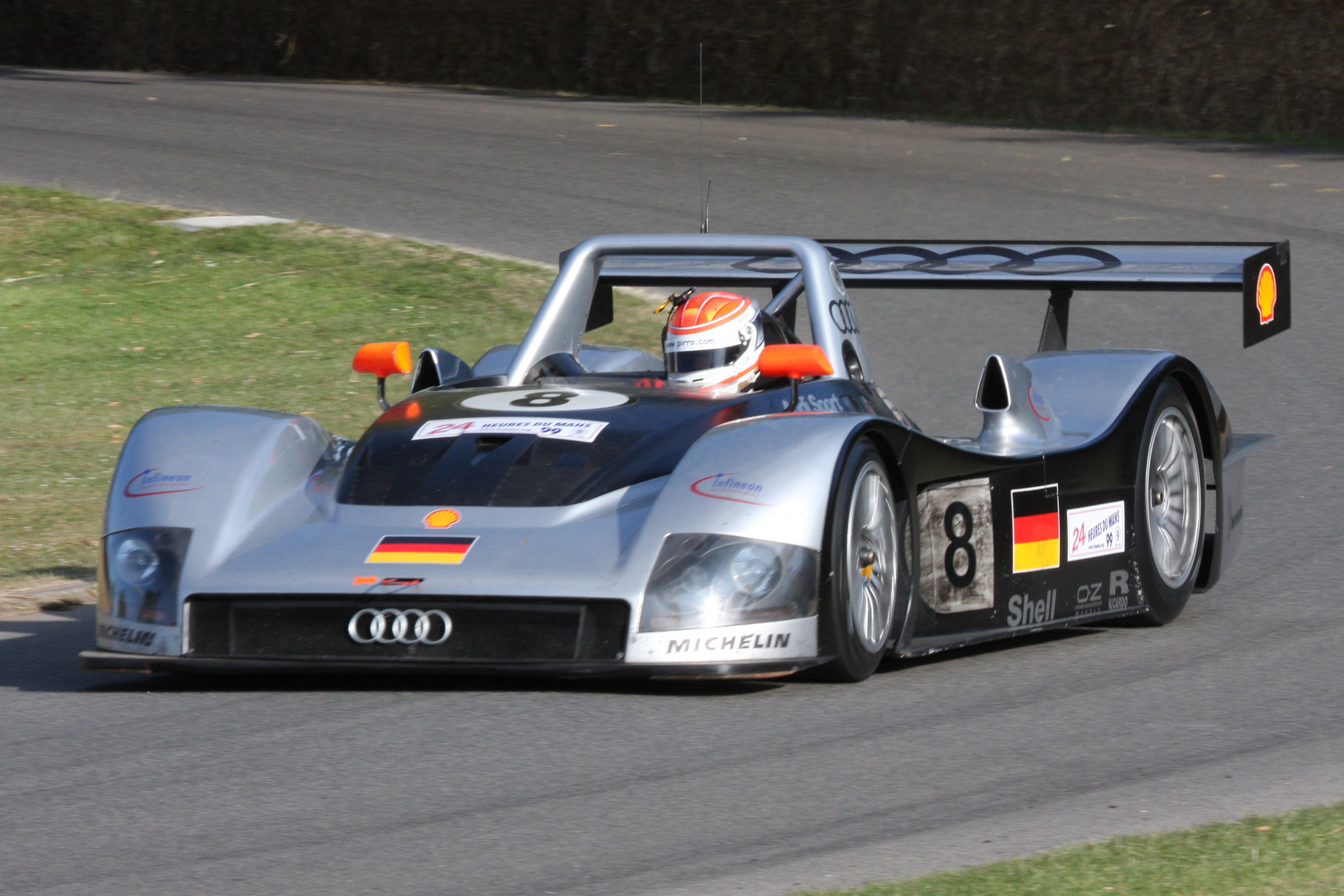
- The No. 8 R8R at the 2009 Goodwood Festival of Speed
- Category: Le Mans Prototype
- Constructor: Audi (Dallara)
- Designers: Michael Pfadenhauer; Wolfgang Appel
- Successor: Audi R8

Technical specifications
- Engine: 3.6 L V8 twin-turbo, mid-engined, longitudinally mounted
- Transmission: Ricardo 6-speed sequential
- Power: 610 hp (450 kW)
- Fuel: Shell
- Tyres: Michelin

Competition history
- Notable entrants: (Germany) Joest Racing
- Debut: 1999 12 Hours of Sebring
- Last event: 2000 Silverstone 500 USA Challenge
Races	Wins	Podiums	Poles
4	0	3	0

1999 Audi R8R
Audi R8R at Goodwood Festival of Speed 2009

The Audi R8R was a Le Mans Prototype built by Audi for the 1999 24 Hours of Le Mans, and a predecessor to the dominant Audi R8 which debuted in 2000. It was raced alongside the British built closed-cockpit Audi R8C.

== Development ==
The R8R project began in 1997, when Audi began research into entering the 24 Hours of Le Mans. The first prototype was displayed in 1998, showing an open cockpit car which featured many Audi styling cues, yet lacked some of the practical necessities for sports car racing. The car, designed by Michael Pfadenhauer and Wolfgang Appel and built by Dallara, featured an Audi 3.6-litre twin-turbo V8 engine. Styling features included a large group of aerodynamic vents in the nose, as well as high sidepods which featured NACA ducts on their tops to feed the turbochargers. A large vent on the side also allowed air out from the front wheel well.

By the car's debut at the 1999 12 Hours of Sebring, the aerodynamics were evolved. A longer tail was prominent, with the wheel arches more subtly curved into the side pods, instead of an abrupt hard-edge design. The front end was also lower and featured more aerodynamic styling over the original stylized prototype.

However, following Sebring, further testing was done on the R8R in order to better improve its overall speed in preparation for Le Mans. The front bodywork was further evolved, with a wider and more curved sidepod being used. The NACA ducts were also replaced with a vertical air inlet coming out of the side fender. The tail was also shortened, and aerodynamic elements were added to the styling of the sidepods.

Only five R8Rs would be built in total. #204 and #205 would run Sebring only in 1999, while #307 and #308 would run Le Mans. #306 would be added in 2000 to compete in the American Le Mans Series. Lessons learned from the R8R would be later evolved into the R8 for 2000.

== Racing history ==
Following months of testing, the R8R made its racing debut at the 12 Hours of Sebring in 1999. Run by Joest Racing of Germany, the R8Rs showed some initial difficulties in qualifying, managing to set merely the 11th and 12th fastest times. However, during the race, the cars showed their durability by being able to outlast most of the competitors who had initially outpaced them. Even though the also new BMW V12 LMR suffered some problems, one of their entries was far superior in terms of pace and reliability. Following twelve hours though, R8Rs were successful in taking a podium with a 3rd-place finish, while the other team car managed 5th.

Following Sebring, the R8Rs returned to testing, joined by the new R8Cs. At Le Mans testing in May, the R8Rs were able to go up against the bulk of the major manufacturers for the first time. The Audis showed their pace by taking the 8th and 11th fastest lap times over the test, beating competitors such as Mercedes-Benz and Nissan.

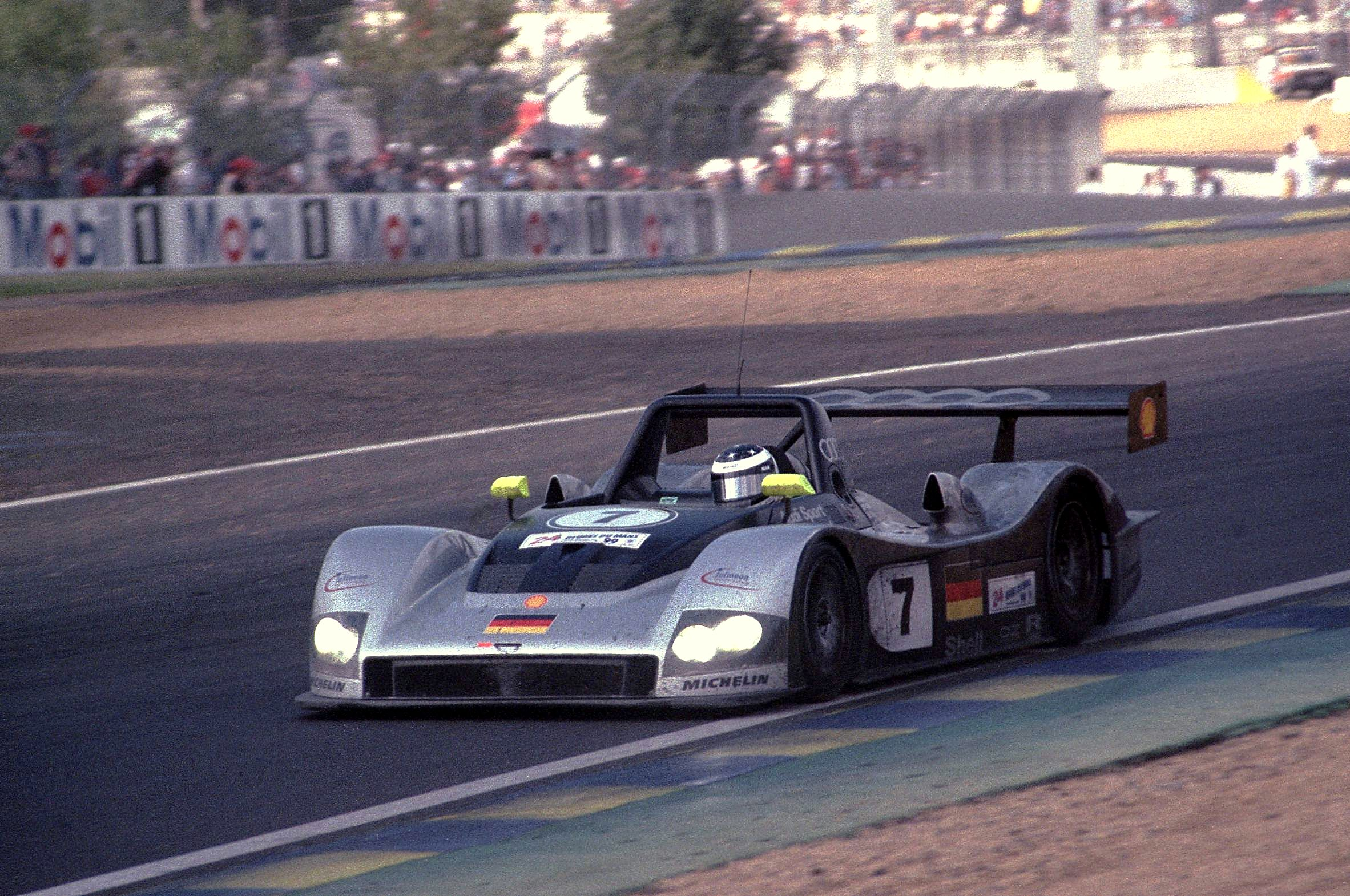
The No. 7 R8R took fourth during the 1999 24 Hours of Le Mans.

For the race itself, the R8Rs would again show their reliability. Although they managed to qualify 9th and 11th, they managed to outlast the bulk of their competitors from Mercedes-Benz, Toyota, Panoz, Nissan, and BMW. In the end, the R8Rs managed to come home in a respectable 3rd and 4th places, again scoring a podium. They were beaten by a single BMW yet again, as well as one of the Toyota GT-Ones.

Following the 1999 24 Hours of Le Mans, Audi had to decide which of the two prototypes they'd continue to work on into 2000. The R8Cs, which failed to finish at Le Mans and showed a lack of pace in comparison to the R8Rs, were scrapped. The R8R would be further evolved into an all-new prototype known simply as the Audi R8, sharing nothing mechanical or stylistic from the R8R except for the engine.

However, although the R8 made its debut at the 12 Hours of Sebring in 2000, the car was returned to Europe by Audi to conduct more testing for that year's Le Mans. This left the older R8R to return to the American Le Mans Series to compete in the next two rounds of the season, the Grand Prix of Charlotte and Silverstone 500. At Charlotte, R8R managed to 6th place behind the duo of BMWs and the improved Panoz, although the second R8R suffered mechanical woes and finished well down the order. For Silverstone, the two R8Rs would perform better, again taking a podium finish. Beaten once again by BMW and Panoz, the R8Rs would take 3rd and 4th places. Following Silverstone, the R8Rs were retired permanently as the new R8s would race for the rest of the American Le Mans Series season.

The R8R is estimated to boast around 610 hp (450 kW) from its V8 engine, allowing it to hit 335 km/h (208 mph) in 1999 at Le Mans (the original claims were that the car could go 350 km/h (217 mph)).

== See also ==
- Audi R8C
- Audi R8 (LMP)
