= List of auto racing films =

This article contains a list of films relating to auto racing.

== List ==
Year	Title	Genre	Type	Notes
1913	The Speed Kings	Comedy		8-minute silent film featuring Fatty Arbuckle.
1914	Kid Auto Races at Venice	Comedy		Silent film starring Charlie Chaplin as a spectator who keeps getting in the way.
1919	The Roaring Road	Romance		Car salesman "Toodles" Walden becomes a racer.
1920	Excuse My Dust	Comedy		Wife wants Toodles to give up racing in Roaring Road sequel.
1924	Young Oldfield	Comedy		Jimmy has to win a race to pay the mortgage on his shop.
1924	Sporting Youth	Comedy		A rich man's chauffeur (Reginald Denny) accidentally ends up in a race.
1924	Kid Speed	Comedy		A race organizer drops hints that his daughter's time will go to the winner.
1925	Speed Madness	Action		To keep the old homestead from being foreclosed on, a mother agrees to have her daughter marry the deep-dyed villain who holds the mortgage. However, the daughter has a race-car-driving fiancé who objects, and sets about getting a patent on his new-and-improved automobile valve.
1926	The Checkered Flag	Drama		Jack has to win the big race to save his girl.
1928	The Speed Classic	Action		Jerry Thornton is a wealthy playboy whose fiancée objects to him competing against professorial drives in the upcoming Speed Classic race.
1929	Speedway	Drama		Silent film about a father and son in Indianapolis.
1930	Burning Up	Drama		First talkie about auto racers.
1932	The Racing Strain	Drama		A driver who drinks tries to turn his life around.
1932	The Crowd Roars	Drama	Open wheel	Motor racing saga featuring James Cagney.
1932	High Speed	Drama		An undercover cop races cars while he tries to catch crooks.
1933	High Gear	Drama		After a friend's death, an auto racer takes a job driving a taxi.
1935	Roaring Roads	Comedy		A rich boy craving excitement tries racing and encounters gangsters.
1935	Death Drives Through	Drama		British driver falls in love with woman whose father disapproves.
1936	Speed	Drama	Open wheel	An automotive test driver (James Stewart) struggles to develop a new carburetor by entering cars in the Indy 500 and speed trials at California's Muroc Dry Lake.
1936	Speed to Spare	Drama		Champion race car driver Tommy Morton is the eternal rival of less-ethical speed king Larry "Skids" Brannigan. What no one knows is that Tommy and Skids are actually brothers, separated at birth.
1938	Ten Laps to Go	Drama	Midget cars	Discovering a race is fixed, a new driver joins it with just 10 laps left.
1939	Indianapolis Speedway	Drama	Open wheel	Three-time Indy champ (Pat O'Brien) wants a young driver to go to college.
1939	Burn 'Em Up O'Connor	Action		A series of identical accidents kills racing drivers, but a dim-witted mechanic (Dennis O'Keefe) suspects they were not accidents.
1940	Danger on Wheels	Thriller		During a test, a race car using an experimental oil-fueled engine blows up, killing the driver. Lucky Taylor, a stunt driver, is initially blamed for the accident, but is later cleared. He thinks the engine design has a real chance to win races, but the racing association has banned it since the accident.
1941	Blonde Comet	Romance	Open wheel	A woman (Virginia Vale) races against men, then falls for one of them.
1947	Born to Speed	Action		Johnny Randall, a young race car driver, falls in love with Toni Bradley, who hates racing because her brother was killed in a midget car race.
1947	Buck Privates Come Home	Comedy	Midget cars	Abbott and Costello aid a young midget-car racer.
1949	The Big Wheel	Drama	Open wheel	Mickey Rooney as a brash young driver out to win the Indianapolis 500.
1950	To Please a Lady	Drama	Open wheel	Newspaper columnist gets reckless racer Mike Brannan (Clark Gable) banned.
1953	Jalopy	Comedy		Going backwards, the Bowery Boys win the big race.
1953	Genevieve	Musical	Vintage cars	A British comedy about an automobile rally.
1953	Roar of the Crowd	Drama	Open wheel	Indy 500 contender vows to quit, becomes a sparkplugs salesman.
1954	Johnny Dark	Drama	Distance race	Engineer Tony Curtis enters car in Canada-to-Mexico race.
1954	A Race for Life	Drama	Midget cars	Car's owner wonders if driver (Richard Conte) has lost his nerve.
1955	The Racers	Drama	Open wheel	European circuit racing drama starring Kirk Douglas.
1955	The Widow	Drama		A countess in Italy falls in love with a doomed racing driver.
1956	Checkpoint	Crime	Road racing	A criminal gets into a confrontation with British police at an auto race.
1957	The Devil's Hairpin	Drama	Road racing	Undefeated champion (Cornel Wilde) is coaxed out of retirement.
1960	Thunder in Carolina	Drama	Stock car	Rivals vie in Southern 500, starring Alan Hale, Jr. of Gilligan's Island fame.
1961	The Green Helmet	Drama	Road racing	British film about racers competing in Italy, one of whom has lost his nerve.
1962	The Iron Maiden	Comedy	Traction engines	Alan Hale, Jr. again, in a story about a steam-engine rally.
1963	The Checkered Flag	Action		The wife of an aging, millionaire race car driver talks a young rookie into helping her dispose of her hubby. Lots of racing scenes.
1964	The Lively Set	Drama		A mechanic (James Darren) feels he's perfected a revolutionary turbine engine.
1964	24 heures d'amant	Drama	Sports car	Claude Lelouch-directed film set at the 24 Hours of Le Mans race.
1964	Viva Las Vegas	Musical	Sports car	Elvis Presley is out to win the big race and romances Ann-Margret.
1965	The Great Race	Comedy	Vintage cars	Jack Lemmon and Tony Curtis slapstick about long-distance car race.
1966	Grand Prix	Drama	Formula One	James Garner and Yves Montand in fictional story of drivers' lives and loves.
1966	Red Line 7000	Drama	Stock car	Howard Hawks-directed fiction, starring James Caan.
1966	Fireball 500	Comedy	Stock car	Frankie Avalon and Annette Funicello vehicle.
1966	Spinout	Musical	Open wheel	Elvis Presley has to decide between marrying Shelley Fabares and driving her dad's car in a prestigious race.
1967	Thunder Alley	Romance		Stunt driver (Fabian), boss's daughter (Annette Funicello) team up in 500-mile race.
1967	Hell On Wheels	Romance		Mechanic, engineer fall for same dame. Marty Robbins stars.
1967	A Man and a Woman	Drama	Open wheel	French film about a woman who falls in love with an auto racer.
1967	Speed Racer: The Movie	Animated		Speed Racer, his girlfriend Trixie and all the gang are in a desperate race to save hundreds of lives from the evil clutches of "The Car Hater."
1967	Track of Thunder	Drama	Stock car	Two rival drivers end up involved with the same girl.
1968	Layer Cake / Przekładaniec	Sci-fi	Rallying	The story of a rally driver who undergoes so many transplants that it can no longer be determined which people have contributed to his make-up, based on the screenplay by Stanisław Lem.
1968	The Love Bug	Family		Demolition derby driver gets his hands on a magical Volkswagen Beetle; first in the Herbie series
1968	Speedway	Musical	Stock car	Elvis Presley is out to win the big race and Nancy Sinatra.
1968	The Wild Racers	Drama		Fabian now races on the European circuit.
1968	The Magnificent Tony Carrera	Drama		A Spanish-German film about a successful racer who is also a thief.
1968	Ho!	Drama		Jean-Paul Belmondo plays a racing driver turned bank robber.
1969	Safari 5000 / Eiko e no 5000 kiro	Adventure	Rallying	Japanese movie about an international group of drivers competing in Safari Rally.
1969	I'm waiting in Monte-Carlo / Czekam w Monte-Carlo	Drama	Rallying	In the famous Monte Carlo Rally the Polish team consists of driver Piotr and his co-driver Jan. They compete with other teams as well as with one another - for the feelings of one woman.
1969	Winning	Drama	IndyCar	Paul Newman and Robert Wagner as rival drivers.
1969	Monte Carlo or Bust!	Comedy	Vintage cars	a.k.a. Those Daring Young Men in their Jaunty Jalopies
1969	The Racing Scene	Documentary		A look at actor James Garner's involvement with auto racing.
1969	Pit Stop	Drama	Figure Eight	A promoter sponsors drivers in a "new" form of race car driving called The Figure Eight
1970	Rally / Bensaa suonissa	Drama	Rallying	Finnish movie about two men and a woman, all rally drivers, who get too closely involved, competing in the race and in love.
1971	Motodrama	Comedy	Rallying	A strange coincidence makes an ordinary man get on a motorcycle and win the competition. Soon he becomes a pro-biker, a speedway star and a rally driver.
1971	Le Mans	Drama	Sports car	Steve McQueen as a competitor in 24 Hours of Le Mans.
1971	Once Upon a Wheel	Documentary	Sports car	Paul Newman narrates an ABC television insider's look at auto racing.
1972	Gonshchiki / Racers	Drama	Rallying	Russian movie about a conflict between two rally drivers: an aging master of sports and his ambitious student.
1972	Weekend of a Champion	Documentary	Formula One	Documentary directed by Roman Polanski chronicling Jackie Stewart's racing season.
1973	The Last American Hero	Biographical	Stock car	Fictional biography of Junior Jackson, starring Jeff Bridges as Elroy Jackson, Jr.
1974	Herbie Rides Again	Comedy		Sequel to The Love Bug.
1974	Funny Car Summer	Documentary	Funny Car	Documentary chronicling a summer in the life of funny-car driver Jim Dunn and his family.
1975	Flåklypa Grand Prix	Animation		Reodor Felgen decides that he will enter a car race to defeat his former friend who has stolen his plans for a car.
1975	Death Race 2000	Action		Science-fiction about dangerous car race, starring David Carradine.
1976	Eat My Dust!	Comedy		Racing film starring Ron Howard
1977	Bobby Deerfield	Drama	Formula One	Al Pacino as a famed driver who falls in love with a dying woman.
1977	Checkered Flag or Crash	Comedy	Off Road	Race car driver Walkaway Madden signs up for the big Manila 1000 off-road race through the jungle in the Philippines.
1977	Greased Lightning	Biographical	Stock car	True story of stock-car trailblazer Wendell Scott, starring Richard Pryor.
1977	Herbie Goes to Monte Carlo	Comedy	Rallying	The third entry in the Herbie series.
1977	The Quick and the Dead	Documentary	Open wheel	A behind-the-scenes look at Grand Prix racing, narrated by Stacy Keach.
1978	Safari Rally / 6000 km di paura	Adventure	Rallying	Two rally drivers are rivals in the race but not only: they also share feelings for the same woman.
1978	Rallijs	Drama	Rallying	During an international rally two contestants find a hidden painting in the door of their car. In order not to get excluded from the competition they do not report this fact to their team management.
1978	Gonki bez finisha / Racing Without the Finish	Drama	Rallying	The director of a large Russian automobile plant gives consent for the participation of factory drivers in a rally. He doesn't coordinate this decision with his supervisors.
1979	National Class	Comedy	Rallying	Young rally driver from Belgrade forgoes his relationship and military duties to solely train for the most important rally of his career.
1979	Fast Company	Drama	Drag racing	An up-and-coming drag racer and an aging star cope with a corrupt manager.
1979	Dirt	Documentary	Off-road	From motorcycles to Swamp buggies, off-road racing competitions.
1980	Herbie Goes Bananas	Comedy		The fourth entry in the Herbie series.
1981	The Cannonball Run	Comedy	Cross-country	Based on an actual cross-country race
1982	Six Pack	Comedy	Stock car	Kenny Rogers stars and sings hit theme song.
1982	Safari 3000	Adventure	Rallying	A 3,000-mile rally across Africa attracts a young American (David Carradine).
1982	Ferat Vampire	Horror	Rallying	Mima signs a contract with mysterious foreign car manufacturer Ferat to work as a rally driver. Rumors abound that the new Ferat rally car does not run on petrol...
1983	Heart Like a Wheel	Biographical	Drag racing	Based on the life of Shirley Muldowney, played by Bonnie Bedelia.
1983	Stroker Ace	Comedy	Stock car	Burt Reynolds as a fictional NASCAR star.
1984	Raliul	Drama	Rallying	Romanian movie about a young co-driver, who pursues her passion for cars and rallies, despite all the obstacles she faces.
1985	The Winning Streak	Drama	Rallying	British TV series dealing with the intrigues of a family motor business and the world of rally driving.
1988	Rally	Drama	Rallying	RAI TV series produced in Italy in 1988, directed by Sergio Martino and starring Giuliano Gemma, in the role of a successful rally driver competing in the World Rally Championship.
1988	Born to Race	Drama	Stock car	Fiction featuring Joseph Bottoms in lead role.
1989	Catch Me If You Can	Comedy	Street racing	A hotshot car racer persuades the class president of a small Minnesota high school to gamble on illegal car races to raise money for their school facing closure.
1990	La Carrera Panamericana	Documentary	Historic sports car	Documentary starring Pink Floyd's David Gilmour, Nick Mason and manager Steve O'Rourke.
1990	Checkered Flag	Drama	Open wheel	Unsold TV pilot about friendship of a driver and mechanic.
1990	Dorf Goes Auto Racing	Comedy	Stock car	Direct-to-video short film. Part of Tim Conway's Dorf series.
1990	Days of Thunder	Drama	Stock car	Tom Cruise as a NASCAR newcomer, based loosely on Tim Richmond.
1995	Thunderbolt	Action	Touring car	Hong Kong film with Jackie Chan as a race-car mechanic.
1996	Race the Sun	Family	Solar car	Halle Berry as a teacher whose school competes in World Solar Challenge.
1996	La Passione	Drama	Formula One	Italian film about Ferrari racing.
1997	The Love Bug	Comedy		Made-for-TV remake of original 1968 film of the same title.
1997	Super Speedway	Documentary	Open wheel	Follow the Newman-Haas (Andretti) racing team through the process of building, testing, and racing for a season. Narrated by Paul Newman.
2000	eX-Driver	Animation		Miniseries. In a future world where all cars are controlled by artificial intelligence, which often breaks down, one elite group of kids has been selected to drive gasoline-powered non-AI controlled sports cars to prevent accidents.
2000	Miracle in Lane 2	Drama	Soap Box Derby	Made-for-TV film based on the life of Justin Yoder.
2000	Gone in 60 Seconds	Action	Street racing	A retired master thief must steal 50 cars in one night to save his brother’s life.
2001	Driven	Action	Open wheel	Sylvester Stallone as a former Champ Car star.
2001	The Fast and the Furious	Action	Street racing	Brian O'Conner, an LAPD officer, goes undercover in the street racing world to investigate a group of unknown truck hijackers. This film is the first in the Fast & Furious series.
2002	Ekusu doraibâ za mûbî	Animation		The squeal of smoking tires, the roar of the engine, and the thrill of a hairpin turn in a power drift.
2002	éX-Driver The Movie	Anime		The squeal of smoking tires, the roar of the engine, and the thrill of a hairpin turn in a power drift.
2002	The Snake and the Stallion	Documentary	Sports car	The racing history of the AC Cobra, and the rivalry between Carroll Shelby and Enzo Ferrari.
2003	Right on Track	Family	Drag racing	Disney Channel story about a pair of drag-racing sisters.
2003	Kart Racer	Family	Kart racing	The story is about a young boy who wants to enter a go-kart race.
2003	Michel Vaillant	Drama		Racing film based on a French comic book.
2003	2 Fast 2 Furious	Action	Street racing	Brian O'Conner and Roman Pearce team up to go undercover for the U.S. Customs Service to bring down drug lord Carter Verone in exchange for the erasure of their criminal records.
2004	NASCAR 3D: The IMAX Experience	Documentary	Stock car	A big-screen look into one of America's most successful entertainment industries, NASCAR racing.
2004	3: The Dale Earnhardt Story	Documentary	Stock car	Made for TV. Chronicles life and career of Dale Earnhardt.
2005	Dust to Glory	Documentary	Off-road racing	A documentary about the 2003 Baja 1000.
2005	Herbie: Fully Loaded	Comedy	Stock car	The most recent entry in the Herbie series.
2005	Tom and Jerry: The Fast and the Furry	Animated	Stock car	Direct-to-video feature about Tom and Jerry entering a race to win a luxurious mansion.
2006	Cars	Animated	Stock car	Family comedy with voices of Paul Newman (who himself was a retired racing driver), Owen Wilson, Richard Petty (also a former racing driver) and Larry the Cable Guy; numerous racing drivers guest-star, including seven-time Formula One world champion Michael Schumacher.
2006	Talladega Nights: The Ballad of Ricky Bobby	Comedy	Stock car	A cocky NASCAR star (Will Ferrell) must learn humility after setbacks in his career and home life.
2006	The Fast and the Furious: Tokyo Drift	Action	Street racing	High school car enthusiast Sean Boswell is sent to live in Tokyo with his father and finds solace in the city's drifting community.
2007	Colin McRae: Rally Legend	Documentary	Rallying	The definitive documentary of Colin McRae, 1995 World Rally Championship winner.
2007	Dale	Documentary	Stock car	Another look at racing icon Dale Earnhardt.
2007	Ta Ra Rum Pum	Drama	Stock car	Indian film.
2007	Redline	Action	Street racing	A group of multimillionaires wager millions of dollars over their high-powered luxury cars.
2008	Death Race	Sci-fi		Jason Statham in a revised version of 1975 film.
2008	Death Racers	Sci-fi		Futuristic story of prisoners competing in race to the death.
2008	Rallybrudar	Comedy	Rallying	Swedish comedy, set in the 1960s, about a woman who wants to drive in rallies and overcomes all obstacles to do it.
2008	Short Track	Comedy	Stock cars	Experiences of a five-time stock car racing short track champion are exposed through unique characters that work and play through weeks that culminate in 120 mph Saturday nights.
2008	Speed Racer	Action	Futuristic	Live-action version of Japanese anime series, with Emile Hirsch as Speed.
2008	Street Racer	Action		Mockbuster of Speed Racer with similarities to The Fast & The Furious
2008	Truth in 24	Documentary	Sports car	A team's preparation for 2008's 24 Hours of LeMans.
2009	Ralliraita	Comedy	Rallying	Finnish movie about two opposing rally teams who arrange a rally to settle their disagreements.
2009	Love The Beast	Documentary	Tarmac rally	Australian film directed by and featuring Eric Bana and his 1970s Ford car.
2009	Racing Dreams	Documentary	Karting	Kids ages 11–13 aspire to someday become NASCAR drivers.
2009	Redline	Sci-fi		Japanese animated film.
2009	Fast & Furious	Action	Street racing	Set before the events of Tokyo Drift, Dominic Toretto and Brian O'Conner are forced to work together, racing to take down a powerful drug lord.
2010	Tacho / Dotkni se duhy	Comedy	Rallying	Black comedy about a successful rally driver and his race of a lifetime, starring Czech rally driver Daniel Landa.
2010	Death Race 2	Sci-fi		Prequel for the 2008 Death Race film.
2010	Senna	Documentary	Open wheel	The life and death of Formula One great Ayrton Senna.
2010	Tim Richmond: To the Limit	Documentary	Stock car	Made for TV as a part of ESPN's 30 for 30 series. A look at Tim Richmond, his lifestyle, and his death from AIDS.
2011	Born 2 Race	Action	Drag racing	A rebellious teen (Joseph Cross) needs his estranged father's (John Pyper-Ferguson) help to prepare for the NHRA High School Drag Racing Championship.
2011	Red Dirt Rising	Drama	Stock car	Based on the life of early driver Jimmie Lewallen.
2011	Fast Five	Action	Street racing	A street-racing crew attempts a massive heist in Brazil to buy their freedom while running from a federal agent.
2011	Cars 2	Animated	Sports car	Sequel to 2006 family comedy hit. Much like the first film, numerous racing drivers guest star.
2011	25 Hill	Drama	Soap Box Derby	Boy who lost his father teams in Soap Box Derby with man who lost his son.
2012	Truth in 24 II: Every Second Counts	Documentary	Sports car	Sequel to 2008 film, documenting Audi's adventurous and cliffhanging 2011 race.
2013	Death Race 3: Inferno	Sci-fi		Takes place between Death Race 2 and the 2008 Death Race films
2013	Fast & Furious 6	Action	Street racing	A street-racing crew hunts high-tech mercenaries to earn legal pardons and rescue a long-lost teammate.
2013	Rush	Drama	Formula One	True story depicting Hunt–Lauda rivalry between drivers James Hunt and Niki Lauda during the 1976 Formula One season.
2013	1	Documentary	Formula One	Also known as 1: Life on the Limit, a documentary of the history of Formula One.
2013	Turbo	Animated	IndyCar	A snail becomes the fastest thing on the race track.
2013	Snake and Mongoose	Drama	Drag racing	True story depicting rivalry between funny-car drivers Don 'The Snake' Prudhomme and Tom 'The Mongoose' McEwen.
2014	Need for Speed	Action	Street racing	A street racer sets off to race cross-country as a way of avenging his friend's death at the hands of a rival racer.
2015	Furious 7	Action	Street racing	Vengeful assassin Deckard Shaw hunts the crew for revenge, forcing Dominic Toretto and his team to use a global surveillance program to strike back.
2015	Gonchi: la película	Documentary	Open wheel	Documentary film about the Gonzalo Rodríguez, a Uruguayan open wheel racecar driver.
2015	Rosso Mille Miglia	Comedy	Rallying	A journalist returns to her hometown to participate in the famous classic Mille Miglia Rally.
2015	Steve McQueen: The Man & Le Mans	Documentary	Sports car	On the actor's quest to make his 1971 auto-racing film Le Mans.
2015	Winning: The Racing Life of Paul Newman	Documentary		A documentary on Paul Newman's racing career
2016	Italian Race	Drama	Rallying	Giulia is a young promise of GT racing. When her life falls apart, her only hope is her brother, a drug addict and former rally champion.
2016	The 24 Hour War	Documentary	Endurance racing	Documentary on battle between Ford and Ferrari at the 1966 24 Hours of Le Mans race.
2016	Speed Racer: Race to the Future	Animated		Hoping to make racing safer, Pops Racer invents a time machine that takes a driver back in time before a crash. When he installs the machine into the Mach 5, lightning hits the iconic car during a race and sends Speed and his friends 50 years into the future where robots rule and humans are forbidden from driving.
2017	Cars 3	Animated	Sports car	Third installment of the Cars franchise
2017	The Fate of the Furious	Action	Street racing	A cyberterrorist blackmails Dominic Toretto into betraying his team, forcing the crew to partner with an old rival to take down their former leader.
2017	Death Race 2050	Sci-fi		Direct sequel to Death Race 2000
2017	Logan Lucky	Comedy	Stock car	A group of people attempt a heist of the Charlotte Motor Speedway on a racing day.
2018	Death Race: Beyond Anarchy	Sci-fi		Sequel to 2008 Death Race film
2018	Dirt	Action	Off-road	A young car thief works for an off-road racing team.
2018	Over Drive	Action	Rallying	Two brothers work for a rally team. One day they decide to take part in a competition in hope to advance to the WRC (World Rally Championship)
2018	The Last Race	Documentary	Stock car	Stock car racing at Riverhead Raceway on Long Island, New York.
2019	Ott Tänak: The Movie	Documentary	Rallying	Estonian documentary about the life and rallying career of World Rally Championship driver Ott Tänak.
2019	Born2Drive	Documentary	Rallying	Documentary about a seemingly normal 15 year old kid Oliver Solberg.
2019	The Art of Racing in the Rain	Drama	Racing	American family drama about aspiring Formula One race car driver Denny and his dog Enzo, starring Kevin Costner.
2019	Pegasus	Comedy	Rallying	Chinese comedy about a former rally driver on the comeback trail
2019	Trading Paint	Drama	Dirt track	A stock car racing legend is drawn back to the dirt track when his son, an aspiring driver, joins a rival racing team.
2019	Blink of an Eye	Documentary	NASCAR	An examination of the career of Michael Waltrip, climaxing in his victory in the 2001 Daytona 500—an event overshadowed by the final-lap accident that claimed the life of his car owner and friend, Dale Earnhardt.
2019	Ford v Ferrari	Drama	Le Mans	True story depicting Ford's road to take down Ferrari at the 1966 24 Hours of Le Mans race.
2019	Qualified	Documentary	IndyCar	Made for TV as a part of ESPN's 30 for 30 series. Chronicles the struggle of Janet Guthrie to become the first female driver to qualify for the Indianapolis 500.
2020	Lady Driver	Drama	Dirt track	A rebellious teen (Grace Van Dien) becomes a dirt-track racer while trying to uncover her family history.
2021	Me, Her And Rally / My Father's Tracks	Drama	Rallying	Japanese movie about a young man, who returns to his hometown after the death of his father. He decides to participate in a rally with his father's old car.
2021	Queen of Speed	Documentary	Rallying	Documentary film about the career of rally driver Michèle Mouton.
2021	Schumacher	Documentary	Formula One	Exclusive interviews and archival footage trace an intimate portrait of seven-time Formula One champion Michael Schumacher.
2021	F9	Action	Street racing	Dominic Toretto must confront his past when his estranged brother surfaces as a skilled assassin aiming to seize a dangerous orbital weapon.
2022	All Crazy Random	Action		Ex-convict racing driver Danny Jones discovers his brother Séan gambled away their garage, owing debts to gangsters. Danny races to win back losses and save his family, evading criminal threats.
2022	Lamborghini: The Man Behind the Legend	Biographical	Sports car	A biographical drama that chronicles the remarkable life of Ferruccio Lamborghini (Frank Grillo), from his humble beginnings as a tractor manufacturer to his ultimate ambition of creating luxury sports cars.
2022	Villeneuve Pironi	Documentary	Formula One	The story of Canadian Formula One icon Gilles Villeneuve and French star Didier Pironi, two fearless Ferrari Formula One drivers, forever torn apart by a historic and hugely controversial moment in time.
2023	Legends Of The Winding Roads	Documentary	Rallying	Estonian documentary film about the difficulties of being a rally driver under the totalitarian regime of the Soviet Union.
2023	Overhaul / Carga Maxima	Action	Truck racing	Brazilian movie about a racing truck driver, who receives an offer to work as the getaway driver for a gang of thieves.
2023	Gran Turismo	Biographical	Sports car	Based on the video game series by Polyphony Digital, the movie follows Jann Mardenborough and his real journey from a working-class racing gamer to being a pro racer in the 24 Hours of Le Mans, driving for Nissan after competing in the GT Academy.
2023	Formula 24: Race To Talladega	Documentary	Formula 24 Racing	American documentary series following the Richmond Hill Wildcats as they compete in local Formula 24 races.
2023	Rally Road Racers	Animated	Racing	A slow-moving loris competes in a high-stakes car rally to save his grandmother's home from a greedy developer.
2023	Ferrari	Biographical	Sports car	Enzo Ferrari (Adam Driver) grapples with personal and professional crises, including the death of his son Dino the year before, as his racing team prepares to enter the 1957 Mille Miglia.
2024	Gustavo Trelles: Todo es posible	Documentary	Rallying	Documentary film about the most famous rally driver from Uruguay.
2024	Pegasus 2	Comedy	Rallying	A former rally driver, now a driving school instructor, finds new partners and plans a comeback in a famous rally.
2024	Race for Glory: Audi vs. Lancia	Biographical	Rallying	A biopic revolving around the Audi-Lancia rivalry during the 1983 World Rally Championship.
2025	El Correcaminos	Comedy	Mototaxi racing	A retired mototaxi racer returns to racing to save his family's home.
2025	Grand Prix of Europe	Animated	Racing	A mouse disguises herself as a legendary racer to win a high-stakes championship and save her family’s struggling amusement park.
2025	F1	Drama	Formula One	Filmed on location during the 2023 and 2024 Formula One World Championships, revolving around a fictional Formula One driver who returns to the sport to mentor an up-and-coming rookie.

== List of highest grossing auto racing films ==
The following is a list of the highest grossing auto racing films of all time.

The top 18 are among the highest-grossing sports films of all time while the top 2 are among the highest-grossing films of all time.

The Fast & Furious is the most frequent franchise with 10 films on the list. All films in the Cars, Fast & Furious, and Herbie franchise are on the list.

All of the films have had a theatrical run (including re-releases) since 1966, and films that have not played during this period do not appear on the chart because of ticket-price inflation, population size and ticket purchasing trends not being considered. 2006 is the most frequent year with 3 films in the list.

List of highest grossing auto racing films
Rank	Film	Gross	Year	Ref
1	Furious 7	$1,515,342,457	2015	
2	The Fate of the Furious	$1,236,009,236	2017	
3	Fast & Furious 6	$788,683,342	2013	
4	F9: The Fast Saga	$726,229,501	2021	
5	F1	$634,142,436	2025	
6	Fast Five	$626,140,012	2011	
7	Cars 2	$559,853,036	2011	
8	Pegasus 2	$422,878,491	2024	
9	Cars	$461,996,328	2006	
10	Cars 3	$383,930,656	2017	
11	Fast & Furious	$360,405,638	2009	
12	Turbo	$282,570,682	2013	
13	Pegasus	$255,832,826	2019	
14	Gone in 60 Seconds	$237,202,299	2000	
15	2 Fast 2 Furious	$236,353,236	2003	
16	Ford v Ferrari	$226,299,480	2019	
17	The Fast and the Furious	$207,517,995	2001	
18	Need for Speed	$203,277,636	2014	
19	Talladega Nights: The Ballad of Ricky Bobby	$163,369,094	2006	
20	The Cannonball Run	$160,000,000	1981	
21	The Fast and the Furious: Tokyo Drift	$158,968,749	2006	
22	Days of Thunder	$157,920,733	1991	
23	Herbie: Fully Loaded	$144,146,816	2005	
24	Gran Turismo	$122,076,738	2023	
25	Speed Racer	$93,945,766	2008	
26	Rush	$93,328,577	2013	
27	Death Race	$76,014,335	2008	
28	Driven	$54,744,738	2001	
29	The Love Bug	$51,264,022	1968	
30	Logan Lucky	$48,453,605	2017	
31	Ferrari	$43,601,123	2023	
32	Herbie Rides Again	$38,229,000	1974	
33	The Art of Racing in the Rain	$33,766,787	2019	
34	Herbie Goes to Monte Carlo	$29,000,000	1977	
35	The Great Race	$25,333,333	1965	
36	NASCAR 3D: The IMAX Experience	$22,248,831	2004	
37	Grand Prix	$20,845,016	1966	
38	Six Pack	$20,225,989	1982	
39	Herbie Goes Bananas	$18,000,000	1980	
40	Grand Prix of Europe	$15,861,878	2025	
41	Winning	$14,644,335	1969	
42	A Man and a Woman	$14,173,806	1966	
43	Death Race 2000	$14,000,000	1975	
44	Stroker Ace	$11,400,000	1983	
45	Viva Las Vegas	$9,442,967	1964	
46	Bobby Deerfield	$9,300,000	1977	
47	Redline	$8,267,379	2007	
48	Michel Vaillant	$7,463,092	2003	
49	The Pinchcliffe Grand Prix	$6,439,069	1975	
50	Le Mans	$5,500,000	1971	

== See also ==
- List of sports films
- List of highest grossing sports films
