= Street Racer =

Street Racer or Street racer may refer to:

- A person who participates in street racing
- Street Racer (1977 video game), Atari 2600 video game
- Street Racer (1994 video game), video game published by Ubisoft on various systems
- Street Racer (film), 2008 film
- Street Racers (film), a 2008 Russian action film
