= Truth in 24 II =

Truth in 24 II: Every Second Counts
- Truth in 24 II release poster
- Directed by: Rob Gehring
- Produced by: Charles N. Besser; Howard Katz; Steve Sabol
- Starring: Jason Statham (narrator)
- Edited by: Charlie Askew; Rob Gehring; Dave Neupauer; Brian Rosenfeld
- Distributed by: Intersport; NFL Films
- Release date: March 26, 2012
- Running time: 83 minutes
- Language: English

Truth in 24 II: Every Second Counts is a 2012 documentary film detailing Audi's preparation for the 2011 24 Hours of Le Mans. The film is based on the documentary Truth in 24 which detailed Audi's preparation for the 2008 24 Hours of Le Mans.

British action film actor Jason Statham is the film's narrator. Numerous Audi officials and drivers are interviewed through the film, including the eventual winning team of Marcel Fässler, André Lotterer, and Benoît Tréluyer.

== Release ==
Truth in 24 II: Every Second Counts premiered on-on air on SpeedTV on May 5, 2012. The film was also released for free download on iTunes.
