= 24 heures d'amant =

1964 film

- Directed by: Claude Lelouch
- Written by: Claude Lelouch
- Produced by: Claude Lelouch
- Starring: Luce Dijoux; Carlos Da Silva
- Cinematography: Jean Collomb
- Music by: Georges Moustaki
- Distributed by: Les Films 13
- Release date: 1964 (France)
- Running time: 15 minutes
- Country: France
- Language: French

24 heures d'amant is a 1964 film by Claude Lelouch, starring Carlos da Silva and Luce Dijoux. Set during the 24 hours of Le Mans race, Lelouch used shots from the 1963 race for its racing sequence.

The film's title is a pun on 24 Heures du Mans (amant meaning lover in French).
