= 2008 24 Hours of Le Mans =

76th 24 Hours of Le Mans endurance race

Previous: 2007	Next: 2009
Index: Races | Winners

Circuit de la Sarthe track

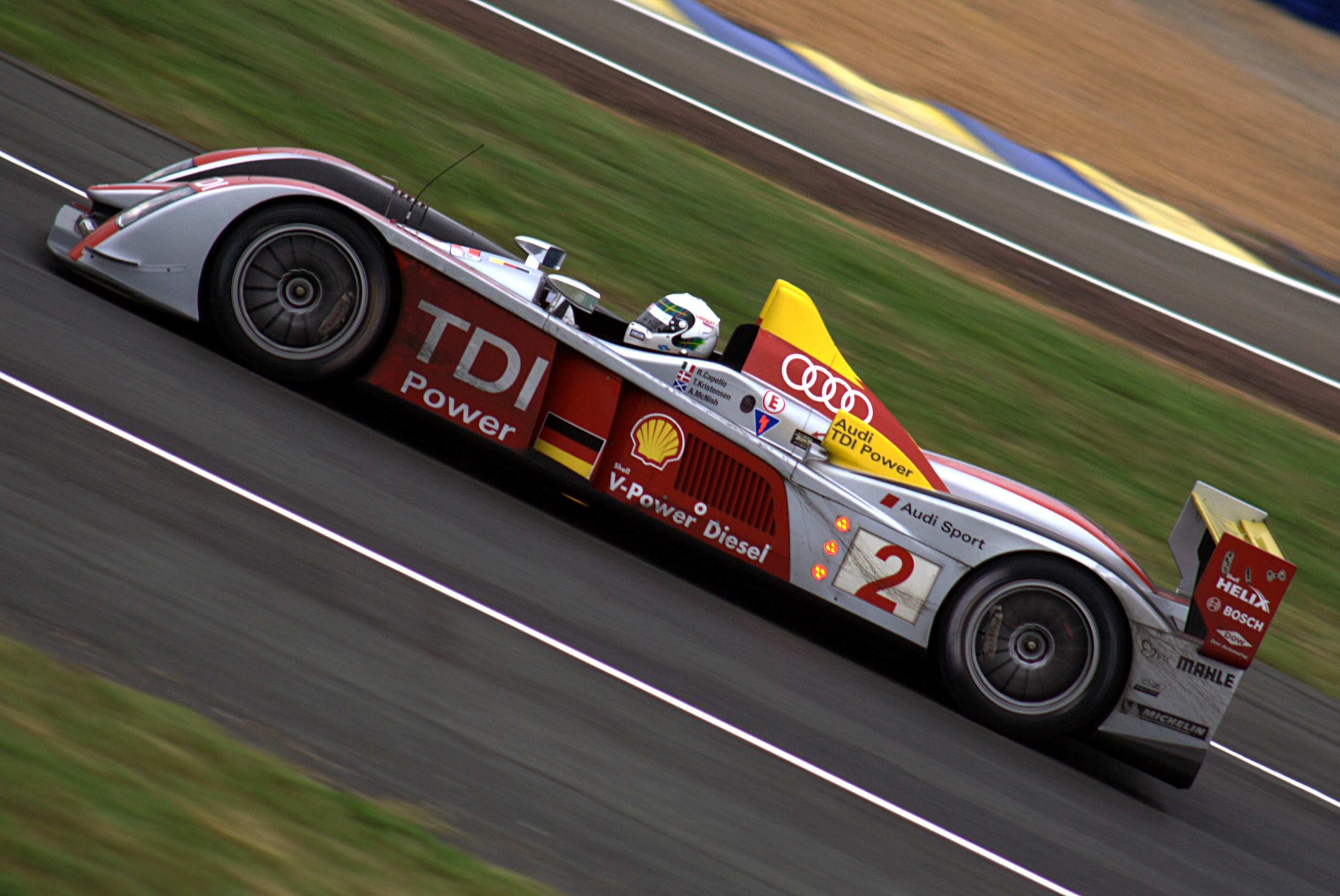
Allan McNish in the #2 Audi R10 TDI which won the 2008 24 Hours of Le Mans.

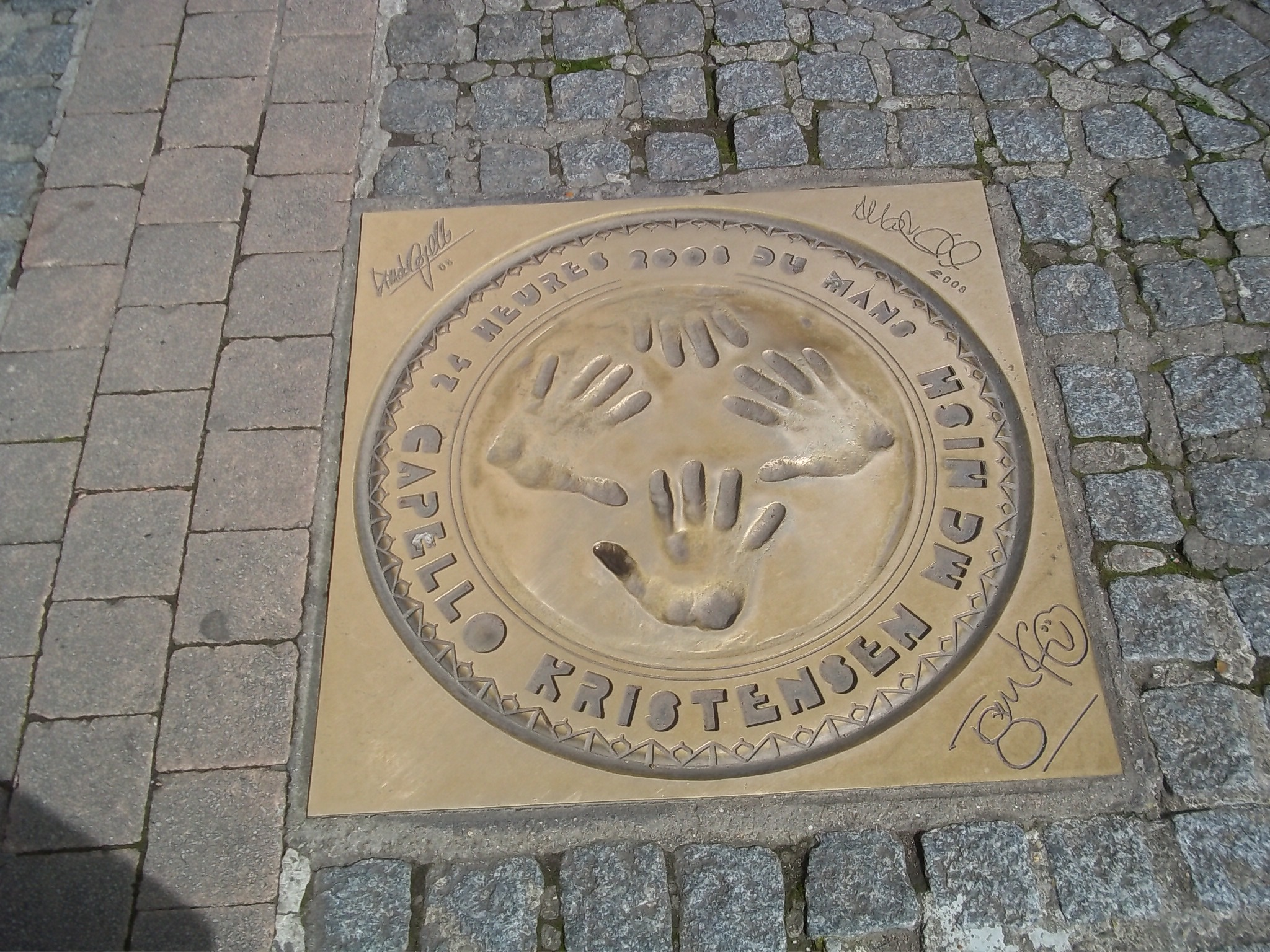
Handprint's winners 2008 edition in the Hall of fame of Le Mans

The 2008 24 Hours of Le Mans was the 76th Grand Prix of Endurance, taking place on 14–15 June 2008 at the Circuit de la Sarthe, Le Mans, France, organised by the Automobile Club de l'Ouest (ACO). The test day was on June 1. The race was attended by 258,000 spectators. The Audi team's progress and victory was documented in the 2008 film Truth in 24.

== Rule changes ==
On 20 December 2007, the ACO confirmed the previously announced rule changes for the 2008 race and 2008 Le Mans Series season. Petrol engined Le Mans Prototype cars received a 3% larger air restrictor to increase power output and to balance performance between petrol and diesel engines. The performance difference between the LMP1 and LMP2 classes will be increased by decreasing LMP1 class' minimum weight 900 kg, the LMP2 class' minimum weight increased to 825 kg, and a reduction in the fuel capacity of LMP2 cars from 90 litres to 80 litres.

The ACO also added rules regarding the types of engines and fuels which can be used. Production engines which meet the GT1 and GT2 class regulations can now be installed in LMP1 and LMP2 class cars respectively. The use of biofuels will also be allowed in the prototype categories, with petrol engines allowed to run 10% ethanol, and diesel teams allowed to use biodiesel. The GT1 and GT2 categories remained unchanged in the new rules.

Prior to the Le Mans Test Day, Audi announced that they would be the first team to adapt their cars to use 10% biodiesel as allowed by the new rules, with partner Shell developing a biomass to liquid fuel.

== Entries ==
=== Automatic invitations ===
Automatic entry to the 2008 24 Hours of Le Mans was granted to teams that had performed well in the previous year's 24 Hours of Le Mans, as well as the 2007 seasons of the American Le Mans Series, Le Mans Series, FIA GT Championship, and the Petit Le Mans. The official list of automatic invites was published by the ACO on 16 November 2007, with confirmation of entries accepted by teams published on 18 January 2008.

==== List of automatic invitations ====
Team	Reason Entered	Note
LMP1
(Germany) Audi Sport North America	1st in 2007 24 Hours of Le Mans	
(France) Team Peugeot Total	2nd in 2007 24 Hours of Le Mans	
(France) Team Peugeot Total	1st in 2007 Le Mans Series championship	
(France) Pescarolo Sport	2nd in 2007 Le Mans Series championship	
(United States) Audi Sport North America	1st in 2007 Petit Le Mans	
(United States) Autocon Motorsports	2nd in 2007 American Le Mans Series championship^{1}	
LMP2
(United States) Binnie Motorsports	1st in 2007 24 Hours of Le Mans	Entry not taken
(France) Barazi-Epsilon	2nd in 2007 24 Hours of Le Mans	
(United Kingdom) Ray Mallock Ltd.	1st in 2007 Le Mans Series championship	
(Portugal) Quifel ASM Team	2nd in 2007 Le Mans Series championship	
(United States) Penske Racing	1st in 2007 Petit Le Mans	Entry not taken
(United States) Penske Racing	1st in 2007 American Le Mans Series championship	Entry not taken
GT1
(United Kingdom) Aston Martin Racing	1st in 2007 24 Hours of Le Mans	
(United States) Corvette Racing	2nd in 2007 24 Hours of Le Mans	
(France) Team Oreca	1st in 2007 Le Mans Series championship	Entry not taken
(France) Luc Alphand Aventures	2nd in 2007 Le Mans Series championship	
(United States) Corvette Racing	1st in 2007 Petit Le Mans	
None	2nd in 2007 American Le Mans Series championship^{2}	
(Germany) Vitaphone Racing	1st in 2007 FIA GT Championship	Entry not taken^{3}
(Italy) Scuderia Playteam Sarafree	2nd in 2007 FIA GT Championship	Entry not taken
GT2
(France) IMSA Performance Matmut	1st in 2007 24 Hours of Le Mans	
(United States) Risi Competizione	2nd in 2007 24 Hours of Le Mans	
Virgo Motorsport	1st in 2007 Le Mans Series championship	
(Germany) Team Felbermayr-Proton	2nd in 2007 Le Mans Series championship	
(United States) Flying Lizard Motorsports	1st in 2007 Petit Le Mans	
(United States) Risi Competizione	1st in 2007 American Le Mans Series championship	
(Italy) Motorola AF Corse	1st in 2007 FIA GT Championship	
(Italy) BMS Scuderia Italia	2nd in 2007 FIA GT Championship	

1. Due to Audi Sport North America already earning two entries, their third automatic entry was passed to the next team in the championship.

2. Due to Corvette Racing already earning two entries, their third automatic entry would have been passed to the next team in the championship. However, no team had run enough ALMS races to be counted towards the GT1 championship, leaving the invitation unassigned.

3. Vitaphone Racing initially turned down their automatic invitation due to their Maserati MC12 not complying with ACO rules. The team however reapplied for a legal Aston Martin DBR9 in the same class at a later date.

=== Official entry list ===
On 19 February, the ACO published their full list of fifty-five entries plus eight reserves, chosen from a total of 88 applications. The fifty-five main entries were required to appear at the Le Mans test day in order to compete.

==== Reserve entries ====
Eight cars were granted reserve entries. If any selected team from the main entry list withdrew, a reserve entry would take their place. On April 10, the #81 Tafel Racing Ferrari withdrew and was replaced by the #4 Saulnier Pescarolo-Judd. Although several teams withdrew their reserve entries, none of the remaining reserve entries were promoted to the primary entry list. On Tuesday, June 10, Racing Box's Lucchini-Judd failed official scrutineering and was withdrawn. The first remaining reserve, Epsilon Euskadi's second entry, was allowed to take its place at the start of Wednesday qualifying.

== Test session ==
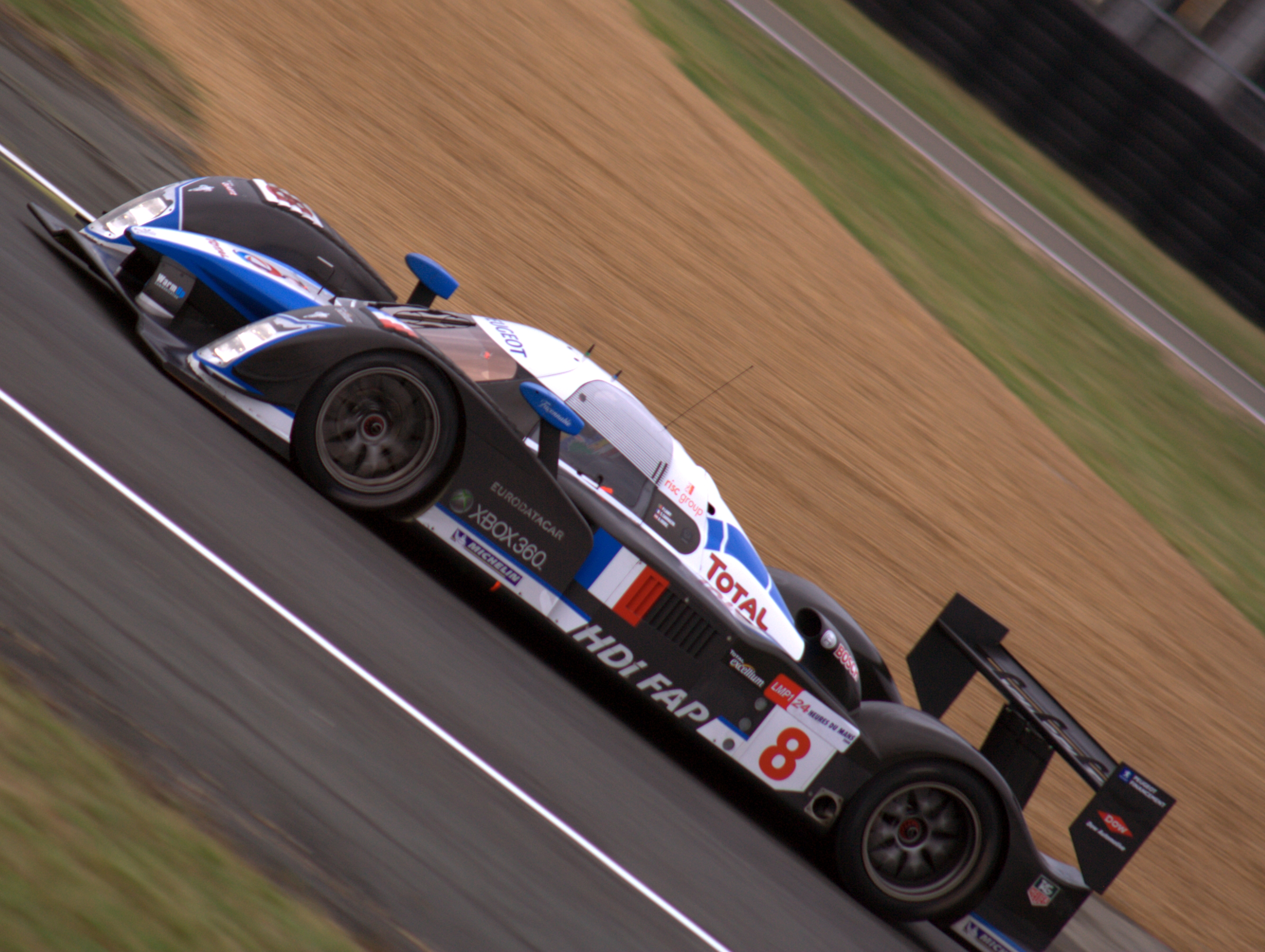
The #8 Peugeot 908 HDi FAP, driven by Stéphane Sarrazin, which set a 3:22.222 lap time during the test day

Drivers, team, and equipment for fifty-five cars arrived at the Circuit de la Sarthe on June 1 to participate in a mandatory test session. Drivers who had not been to the circuit in the past three runnings of the 24 Hours, or had never participated before, were required to complete ten laps of the circuit during the session, while other drivers were allowed to concentrate on setting their cars up for the race two weeks away. Two sessions were held running four hours each, with an hour break for lunch.

Rain dominated the weather during the two sessions, with the track drying out only for brief periods of time before heavy rains dampened the circuit once more. Stéphane Sarrazin, in the #8 Peugeot, was able to set the fastest lap during a brief dry period in the second session, recording a time of 3:22.222. By the end of the test day, Sarrazin's time remained unbeaten, and was in fact nearly four and a half seconds ahead of the second fastest lap, set by the #9 Peugeot. Several hundredths of a second slower still was the #1 Audi, third fastest overall. The fastest car not running a diesel engine was the #17 Pescarolo, recording a time of 3:33.939, over eleven seconds behind the overall leader. In the LMP2 class, the five cars set lap times within three seconds of one another, the Van Merksteijn Motorsport Porsche setting a 3:42.191 lap time to lead the class and place fourteenth overall in the standings. The other Porsche RS Spyder of Team Essex was second fastest, followed by the Barazi-Epsilon Zytek in third.

The Grand Touring categories were led by the previous year's winner in GT1 class, the factory Aston Martin squad. The #009 DBR9 set a lap time of 3:53.531, fast enough for 25th place overall. Larbre Compétition's Saleen set the second fastest lap in the class, nearly two seconds behind. The two factory Corvettes were third and fourth, with the #64 team a few tenths faster than the #63. For the GT2 class, American teams lead the session. Risi Competizione's #82 Ferrari set a 4:05.561 lap time, only three one thousandths of a second ahead of the Flying Lizard Porsche. BMS Scuderia Italia's Ferrari completed the top three in the class, a second slower than the top two.

During the eight hours of testing, practice had to be halted four times for accidents around the circuit. During the first session, the JMB Ferrari spun and hit a wall at Arnage, requiring it to be towed from the track. The Ferrari did however return to the track several hours later after repairs. Shortly after the beginning of the second test session, the Risi-Krohn Ferrari also had a spin, impacting the wall at the Ford Chicane, leading to driver Tracy Krohn being briefly hospitalized. Less than an hour later, Marc Gené in the #7 Peugeot spun in the Karting curve and his 908 became airborne, impacting the wall heavily. Gené was hospitalized with an injured toe, and the car had to be replaced by a new chassis. The final stoppage of practice occurred in the final hour when Joey Foster impacting the wall at the Dunlop Chicane with his Embassy-Zytek.

== Qualifying ==
Qualifying was held on 11–12 June, with two individual two-hour sessions being held each day. The first sessions were held at early dusk, while following an hour break, the second sessions ran into the darkness of night. All drivers were once again required to set a minimum of laps to prepare themselves for the circuit; three laps required in the first session, and another three laps in the night session. The best lap time from all four combined determined the starting grid.

=== Wednesday ===
Following a wet test day, qualifying began under dry conditions. The Peugeot lapped under 3:20 min, lap times reminding of that of the Porsche 917 records set in 1971, when the track had almost no chicanes, and was 120m shorter. Stéphane Sarrazin on Peugeot Nr 8 grabbed pole-position in 3:18.513, shortly followed by Franck Montagny on Peugeot Nr 9 with 3:18.862.

=== Thursday ===
The second day of qualifying will determine the final grid.

=== Qualifying times ===
Class leaders and the fastest lap time in each class on each day are in bold. The fastest lap for each car is in gray.

Pos	No.	Team	Car	Class	Day 1	Day 2	Behind
1	8	**(France) Team Peugeot Total**	Peugeot 908 HDi FAP	LMP1	**3:18.513**	**3:20.566**	**Leader**
2	9	(France) Peugeot Sport Total	Peugeot 908 HDi FAP	LMP1	3:18.682	3:24.966	+0.169
3	7	(France) Team Peugeot Total	Peugeot 908 HDi FAP	LMP1	3:20.451	3:21.490	+1.938
4	2	(Germany) Audi Sport North America	Audi R10 TDI	LMP1	3:24.105	3:23.847	+5.334
5	3	(Germany) Audi Sport Team Joest	Audi R10 TDI	LMP1	3:24.287	3:26.432	+5.774
6	10	(Czech Republic) Charouz Racing System	Lola B08/60-Aston Martin	LMP1	3:34.211	3:25.158	+6.645
7	1	(Germany) Audi Sport North America	Audi R10 TDI	LMP1	3:27.580	3:25.289	+6.776
8	11	(Japan) Dome Racing Team	Dome S102	LMP1	3:29.352	3:26.928	+8.415
9	16	(France) Pescarolo Sport	Pescarolo 01-Judd	LMP1	3:28.533	3:32.407	+10.020
10	5	(France) Team Oreca-Matmut	Courage-Oreca LC70-Judd	LMP1	3:30.490	3:32.176	+11.977
11	17	(France) Pescarolo Sport	Pescarolo 01-Judd	LMP1	3:30.618	3:30.905	+12.105
12	12	(Czech Republic) Charouz Racing System	Lola B07/17-Judd	LMP1	3:31.910	3:31.135	+12.622
13	6	(France) Team Oreca-Matmut	Courage-Oreca LC70-Judd	LMP1	3:31.243	3:33.139	+12.730
14	34	**(Netherlands) Van Merksteijn Motorsport**	Porsche RS Spyder Evo	LMP2	3:34.078	**3:32.301**	+13.788
15	21	(Spain) Epsilon Euskadi	Epsilon Euskadi ee1	LMP1	3:41.526	3:32.939	+14.426
16	31	(Denmark) Team Essex	Porsche RS Spyder Evo	LMP2	**3:33.441**	3:38.621	+14.928
17	20	(Spain) Epsilon Euskadi	Epsilon Euskadi ee1	LMP1	3:39.158	3:34.281	+15.768
18	18	(United Kingdom) Rollcentre Racing	Pescarolo 01-Judd	LMP1	3:35.450	3:35.020	+16.507
19	32	(France) Barazi-Epsilon	Zytek 07S/2	LMP2	3:35.344	3:44.555	+16.831
20	33	(Switzerland) Speedy Racing Team Sebah	Lola B08/80-Judd	LMP2	3:35.401	–	+16.888
21	14	(United Kingdom) Creation Autosportif	Creation CA07-AIM	LMP1	3:35.994	3:39.638	+17.481
22	24	(Japan) Terramos	Courage-Oreca LC70-Judd	LMP1	3:37.560	3:40.318	+19.047
23	19	(United Kingdom) Chamberlain-Synergy Motorsport	Lola B06/10-AER	LMP1	3:38.024	3:43.492	+19.511
24	45	(United Kingdom) Embassy Racing	Embassy WF01	LMP2	3:39.926	3:49.019	+21.413
25	25	(United Kingdom) Ray Mallock Ltd.	MG-Lola EX265	LMP2	3:44.188	3:40.027	+21.514
26	40	(Portugal) Quifel ASM Team	Lola B05/40-AER	LMP2	3:41.193	3:44.074	+22.680
27	4	(France) Saulnier Racing	Pescarolo 01-Judd	LMP1	3:46.666	3:42.162	+23.649
28	35	(France) Saulnier Racing	Pescarolo 01-Judd	LMP2	3:42.545	4:10.588	+24.032
29	41	(Switzerland) Trading Performance	Zytek 07S/2	LMP2	3:46.773	3:43.148	+24.635
30	26	(United Kingdom) Team Bruichladdich Radical	Radical SR9	LMP2	3:47.935	3:46.631	+28.118
31	63	**(United States) Corvette Racing**	Chevrolet Corvette C6.R	GT1	**3:49.406**	**3:47.668**	+29.155
32	23	(United States) Autocon Motorsports	Creation CA07-Judd	LMP1	3:56.108	3:47.695	+29.182
33	50	(France) Larbre Compétition	Saleen S7-R	GT1	3:50.920	3:47.761	+29.248
34	44	(Germany) Kruse Schiller Motorsport	Lola B05/40-Mazda MZR-R	LMP2	3:47.802	–	+29.289
35	64	(United States) Corvette Racing	Chevrolet Corvette C6.R	GT1	3:50.766	3:48.539	+30.026
36	009	(United Kingdom) Aston Martin Racing	Aston Martin DBR9	GT1	3:52.266	3:48.994	+30.481
37	007	(United Kingdom) Aston Martin Racing	Aston Martin DBR9	GT1	3:52.527	3:49.060	+30.547
38	55	(Russia) IPB Spartak Racing	Lamborghini Murciélago R-GT	GT1	3:52.175	3:53.000	+33.662
39	72	(France) Luc Alphand Aventures	Chevrolet Corvette C6.R	GT1	3:53.990	3:52.993	+34.480
40	59	(United Kingdom) Team Modena	Aston Martin DBR9	GT1	3:58.193	3:53.031	+34.518
41	22	(Japan) Tōkai University YGK	Courage-Oreca LC70-YGK	LMP1	3:53.143	–	+34.630
42	53	(Germany) Vitaphone Racing Team	Aston Martin DBR9	GT1	3:57.371	3:53.475	+34.962
43	73	(France) Luc Alphand Aventures	Chevrolet Corvette C6.R	GT1	3:55.736	3:58.025	+37.223
44	76	**(France) IMSA Performance Matmut**	Porsche 997 GT3-RSR	GT2	4:00.793	**3:58.152**	+39.639
45	77	(Germany) Team Felbermayr-Proton	Porsche 997 GT3-RSR	GT2	4:02.517	3:59.072	+40.559
46	96	(United Kingdom) Virgo Motorsport	Ferrari F430 GT2	GT2	4:01.293	3:59.820	+41.307
47	80	(United States) Flying Lizard Motorsports	Porsche 997 GT3-RSR	GT2	**4:00.106**	4:02.799	+41.593
48	90	(Germany) Farnbacher Racing	Ferrari F430 GT2	GT2	4:05.098	4:01.464	+42.951
49	82	(United States) Risi Competizione	Ferrari F430 GT2	GT2	4:01.598	4:02.412	+43.085
50	97	(Italy) BMS Scuderia Italia	Ferrari F430 GT2	GT2	4:02.080	4:03.109	+43.577
51	99	(Monaco) JMB Racing	Ferrari F430 GT2	GT2	4:03.293	4:14.033	+44.780
52	85	(Netherlands) Snoras Spyker Squadron	Spyker C8 Laviolette GT2-R-Audi	GT2	4:05.096	4:03.641	+45.138
53	78	(Italy) AF Corse	Ferrari F430 GT2	GT2	4:05.660	4:03.810	+45.297
54	83	(United States) Risi Competizione	Ferrari F430 GT2	GT2	4:07.978	4:04.515	+46.002
55	94	(Switzerland) Speedy Racing Team	Spyker C8 Laviolette GT2-R-Audi	GT2	4:11.564	4:08.284	+49.771

== Race ==
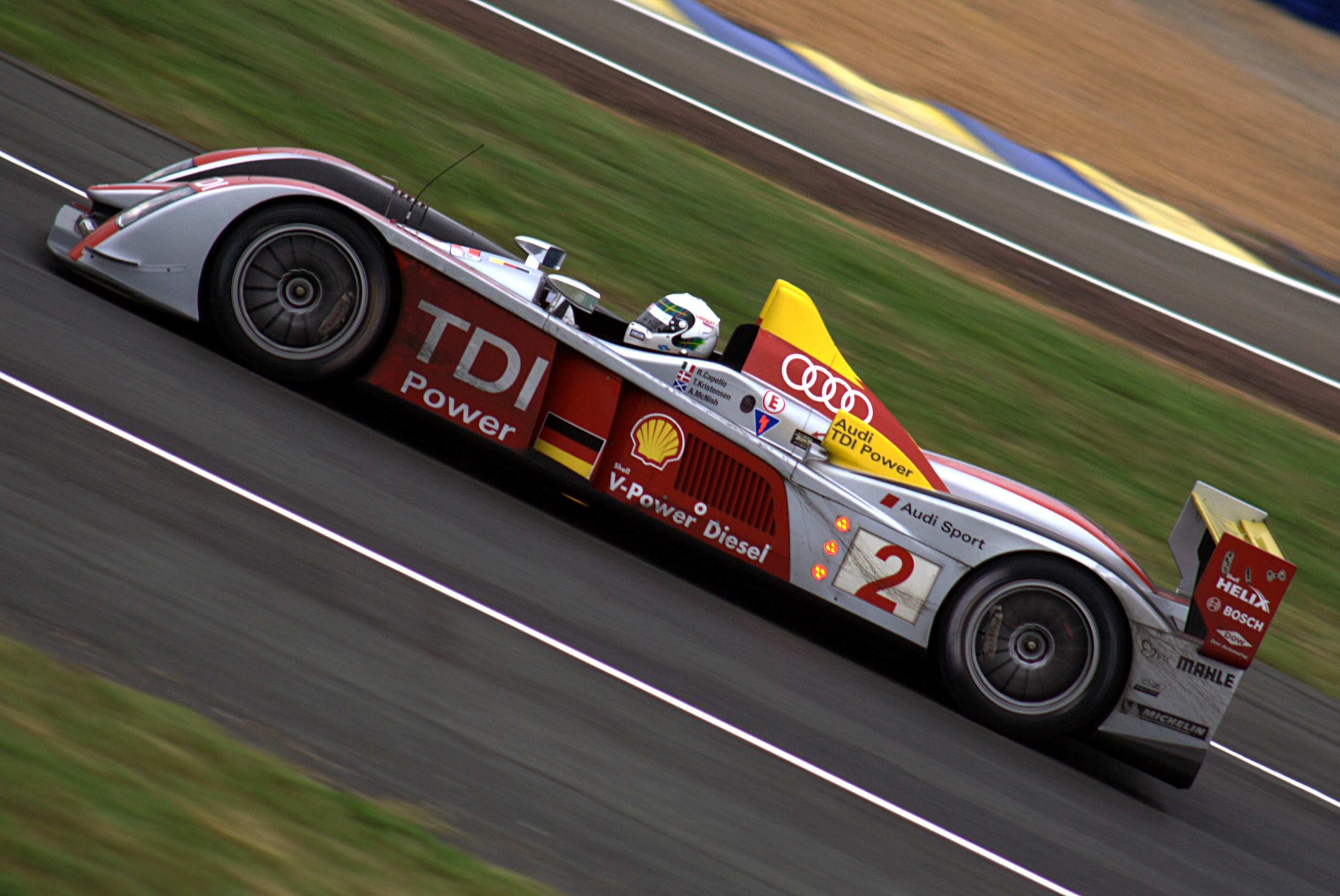
Allan McNish in the winning No. 2 Audi R10 TDI

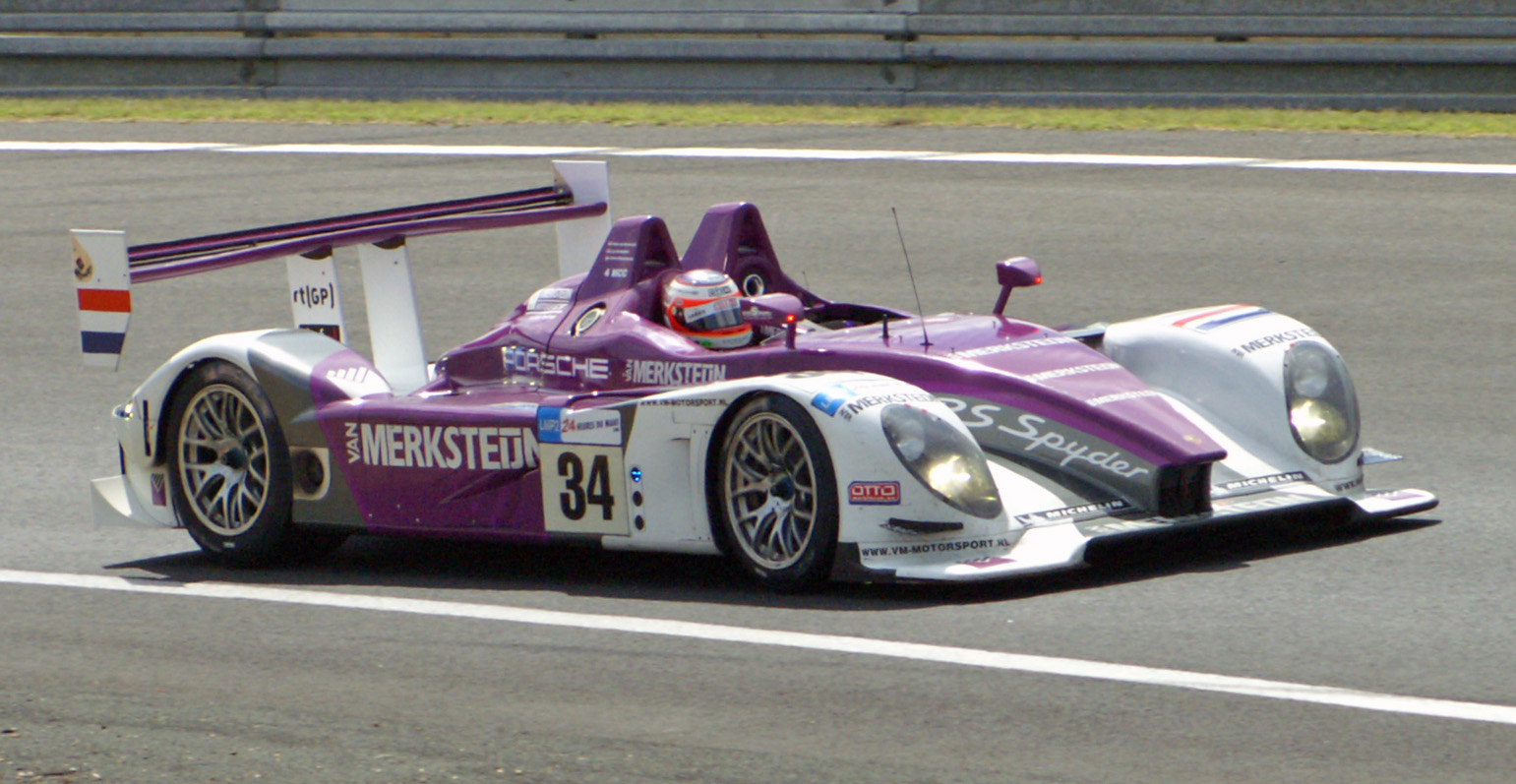
The No. 34 Porsche RS Spyder Evo of Van Merksteijn Motorsport took pole and first place in LMP2

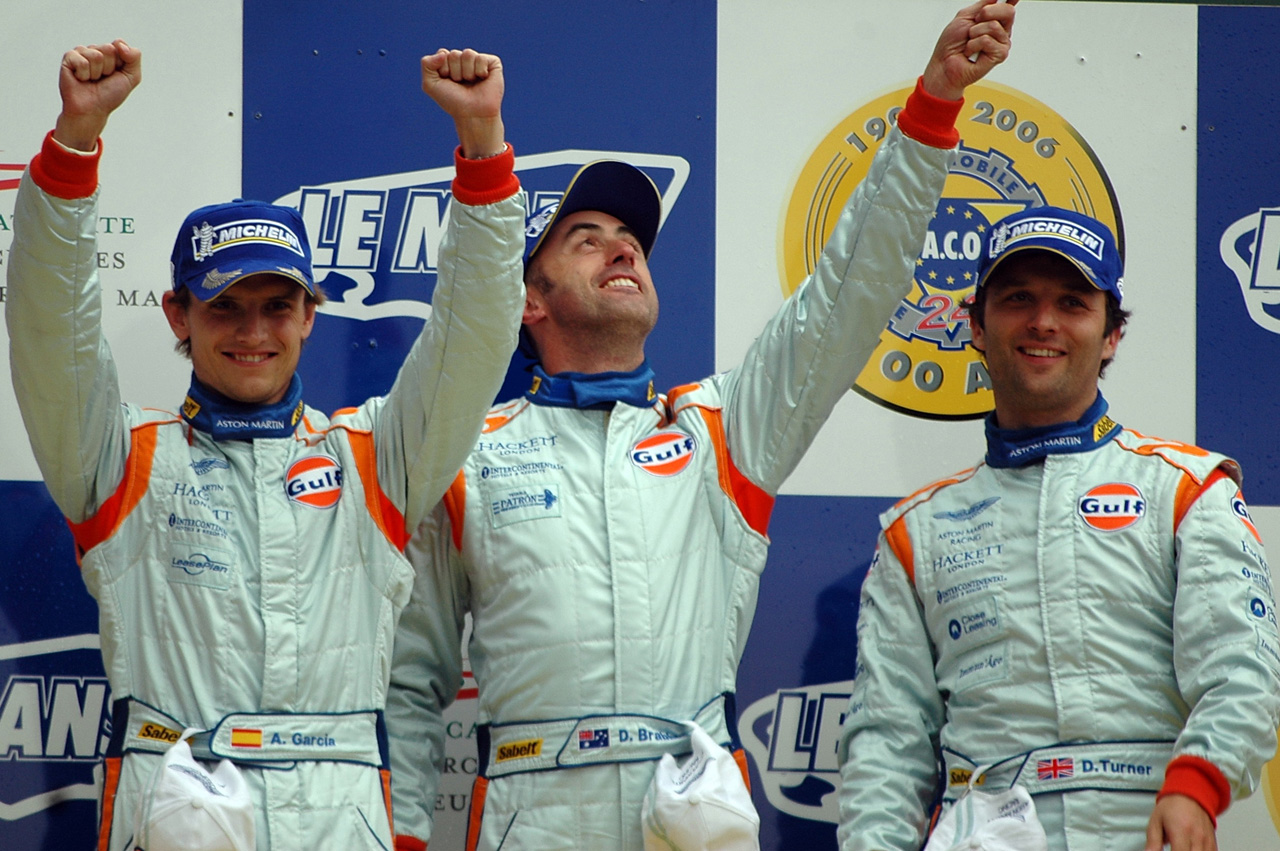
The drivers of the No. 009 Aston Martin DBR9 celebrating a first-place finish in GT1

The race began at 3:00 pm local time (GMT+2). The three Peugeot 908 HDi FAPs led the field into the first chicane, but Allan McNish overtook the #7 Peugeot of Nicolas Minassian at the exit of the Dunlop Chicane. Minassian retook the position on the Mulsanne Straight, and the Peugeots maintained the top three positions at the end of the first lap. The Peugeots were running consistently 3 seconds a lap faster than McNish, and over 5 seconds faster than the other 2 Audis.

In the early hours, the Peugeot #8, Pole setter and only car to set a fast race lap under 3:20, by black flag had been ordered into the pits to repair the headlights. This car trailed the other Diesels by several laps. The GT2 class saw drama for the two Porsches which had been battling for the class lead, as #80 collided with the Pole setting Porsche #76. Only #77 could continue after lengthy repairs.

The situation after 12 hours was as follows: Peugeot #7 was leading, with the first five being within 2 laps, with Audi #2 in 2nd, followed by Peugeot #9, and the Audi #3 and #1. Due to the fast pace and close competition, and despite a 34-minute safety car period, the leaders had completed 200 laps after 12 hours, a pace that might have topped the laps and distances covered in 1971 and 1988 despite the track now having chicanes. In the LMP2 class, the leader was 10th overall, the two Porsches being within a lap, leading the next car by nine laps. In GT1, the leader was 15th overall, the Aston Martins and Corvettes racing head to head less than a minute apart, with six cars being within six laps. In the GT2 class, the leading Ferrari was 26th overall, with no less than five Ferraris battling for the class win which was to be expected after the two class leading Porsches had collided, and five other GT2 cars were already out.

The second half of the race was under wet conditions. Lap times of the whole field went above the 4:00 mark, with GT1 cars actually as fast as the leading diesels. The Audis were able to cope with the rain much better than the Peugeots. Kristensen was able to reel in Minassian at 8 seconds per lap. In a desperate attempt to adapt the Peugeots to the wet conditions all 3 cars were fitted with high-downforce nose and tail sections. At 5am the #2 Audi grabbed the lead and McNish was able to build the advantage to a full lap. The rain stopped and the #7 started to reel in the #2. With less than 2 hours to go the rain returned. Minassian decided to stick with slicks and as a result spun in front of the Lizard Porsche just before the Dunlop Esses. In the end, Audi and Kristensen won once again, with the highest placing Peugeot being in the same lap, but not in reach for overtaking. The six factory-entered diesels dominated the LMP1 class, having no major problems. The Porsche RS Spyders dominated the LMP2 class, posting faster lap times than several LMP1 cars.

In the GT1 class, Aston Martin Racing edged Corvette Racing for the win, placed 13th overall, both covering 344 laps with three more GT1 entrants chasing them. It was AMR's second win against stiff competition from Corvette in as many years. Of the five Ferraris which had led the GT2 class, three made it to the finish ahead of the remaining Porsches which had been lapping slightly faster.

Of the 35 cars still running after 24 hours, only one failed to cover 70% of the 381 laps of the winner. Despite the conditions, the distance record on the current track layout, 380 laps, set in 2006, was beaten by one lap by both the #2 Audi and the #7 Peugeot.

== Official results ==
Class winners are marked in bold. Cars finishing the race but not completing 70% of the winner's distance or cars not finishing the race at the end of 24 hours (marked as DNF; regardless of distance) are listed as NC (Not Classified).

Pos	Class	No	Team	Drivers	Chassis	Tyre	Laps
Pos	Class	No	Team	Drivers	Engine	Tyre	Laps
1	**LMP1**	**2**	**(Germany) Audi Sport North America**	**(United Kingdom) Allan McNish (Italy) Rinaldo Capello (Denmark) Tom Kristensen**	**Audi R10 TDI**	MI	**381**
1	**LMP1**	**2**	**(Germany) Audi Sport North America**	**(United Kingdom) Allan McNish (Italy) Rinaldo Capello (Denmark) Tom Kristensen**	**Audi TDI 5.5 L Turbo V12 (Diesel)**	MI	**381**
2	LMP1	7	(France) Team Peugeot Total	(France) Nicolas Minassian (Spain) Marc Gené (Canada) Jacques Villeneuve	Peugeot 908 HDi FAP	MI	381
2	LMP1	7	(France) Team Peugeot Total	(France) Nicolas Minassian (Spain) Marc Gené (Canada) Jacques Villeneuve	Peugeot HDi 5.5 L Turbo V12 (Diesel)	MI	381
3	LMP1	9	(France) Peugeot Sport Total	(France) Franck Montagny (Brazil) Ricardo Zonta (Austria) Christian Klien	Peugeot 908 HDi FAP	MI	379
3	LMP1	9	(France) Peugeot Sport Total	(France) Franck Montagny (Brazil) Ricardo Zonta (Austria) Christian Klien	Peugeot HDi 5.5 L Turbo V12 (Diesel)	MI	379
4	LMP1	3	(Germany) Audi Sport Team Joest	(Germany) Mike Rockenfeller (Germany) Lucas Luhr (France) Alexandre Prémat	Audi R10 TDI	MI	374
4	LMP1	3	(Germany) Audi Sport Team Joest	(Germany) Mike Rockenfeller (Germany) Lucas Luhr (France) Alexandre Prémat	Audi TDI 5.5 L Turbo V12 (Diesel)	MI	374
5	LMP1	8	(France) Team Peugeot Total	(France) Stéphane Sarrazin (Portugal) Pedro Lamy (Austria) Alexander Wurz	Peugeot 908 HDi FAP	MI	368
5	LMP1	8	(France) Team Peugeot Total	(France) Stéphane Sarrazin (Portugal) Pedro Lamy (Austria) Alexander Wurz	Peugeot HDi 5.5 L Turbo V12 (Diesel)	MI	368
6	LMP1	1	(Germany) Audi Sport North America	(Germany) Frank Biela (Germany) Marco Werner (Italy) Emanuele Pirro	Audi R10 TDI	MI	367
6	LMP1	1	(Germany) Audi Sport North America	(Germany) Frank Biela (Germany) Marco Werner (Italy) Emanuele Pirro	Audi TDI 5.5 L Turbo V12 (Diesel)	MI	367
7	LMP1	17	(France) Pescarolo Sport	(France) Christophe Tinseau (France) Benoît Tréluyer (Switzerland) Harold Primat	Pescarolo 01	MI	362
7	LMP1	17	(France) Pescarolo Sport	(France) Christophe Tinseau (France) Benoît Tréluyer (Switzerland) Harold Primat	Judd GV5.5 S2 5.5 L V10	MI	362
8	LMP1	5	(France) Team Oreca-Matmut	(France) Soheil Ayari (France) Loïc Duval (France) Laurent Groppi	Courage-Oreca LC70	MI	357
8	LMP1	5	(France) Team Oreca-Matmut	(France) Soheil Ayari (France) Loïc Duval (France) Laurent Groppi	Judd GV5.5 S2 5.5 L V10	MI	357
9	LMP1	10	(Czech Republic) Charouz Racing System (United Kingdom) Aston Martin Racing	(Czech Republic) Jan Charouz (Czech Republic) Tomáš Enge (Germany) Stefan Mücke	Lola B08/60	MI	354
9	LMP1	10	(Czech Republic) Charouz Racing System (United Kingdom) Aston Martin Racing	(Czech Republic) Jan Charouz (Czech Republic) Tomáš Enge (Germany) Stefan Mücke	Aston Martin 6.0L V12	MI	354
10	**LMP2**	**34**	**(Netherlands) Van Merksteijn Motorsport**	**(Netherlands) Peter van Merksteijn (Netherlands) Jeroen Bleekemolen (Netherlands) Jos Verstappen**	**Porsche RS Spyder Evo**	MI	**354**
10	**LMP2**	**34**	**(Netherlands) Van Merksteijn Motorsport**	**(Netherlands) Peter van Merksteijn (Netherlands) Jeroen Bleekemolen (Netherlands) Jos Verstappen**	**Porsche MR6 3.4 L V8**	MI	**354**
11	LMP1	18	(United Kingdom) Rollcentre Racing	(Portugal) João Barbosa (France) Stéphan Grégoire (Belgium) Vanina Ickx	Pescarolo 01	D	352
11	LMP1	18	(United Kingdom) Rollcentre Racing	(Portugal) João Barbosa (France) Stéphan Grégoire (Belgium) Vanina Ickx	Judd GV5.5 S2 5.5 L V10	D	352
12	LMP2	31	(Denmark) Team Essex	(Denmark) Casper Elgaard (Denmark) John Nielsen (Germany) Sascha Maassen	Porsche RS Spyder Evo	D	347
12	LMP2	31	(Denmark) Team Essex	(Denmark) Casper Elgaard (Denmark) John Nielsen (Germany) Sascha Maassen	Porsche MR6 3.4 L V8	D	347
13	**GT1**	**009**	**(United Kingdom) Aston Martin Racing**	**(Australia) David Brabham (Spain) Antonio García (United Kingdom) Darren Turner**	**Aston Martin DBR9**	MI	**344**
13	**GT1**	**009**	**(United Kingdom) Aston Martin Racing**	**(Australia) David Brabham (Spain) Antonio García (United Kingdom) Darren Turner**	**Aston Martin 6.0 L V12**	MI	**344**
14	GT1	63	(United States) Corvette Racing	(United States) Johnny O'Connell (Denmark) Jan Magnussen (Canada) Ron Fellows	Chevrolet Corvette C6.R	MI	344
14	GT1	63	(United States) Corvette Racing	(United States) Johnny O'Connell (Denmark) Jan Magnussen (Canada) Ron Fellows	Chevrolet LS7.R 7.0 L V8	MI	344
15	GT1	64	(United States) Corvette Racing	(United Kingdom) Oliver Gavin (Monaco) Olivier Beretta (Italy) Max Papis	Chevrolet Corvette C6.R	MI	341
15	GT1	64	(United States) Corvette Racing	(United Kingdom) Oliver Gavin (Monaco) Olivier Beretta (Italy) Max Papis	Chevrolet LS7.R 7.0 L V8	MI	341
16	GT1	007	(United Kingdom) Aston Martin Racing	(Germany) Heinz-Harald Frentzen (Italy) Andrea Piccini (Austria) Karl Wendlinger	Aston Martin DBR9	MI	339
16	GT1	007	(United Kingdom) Aston Martin Racing	(Germany) Heinz-Harald Frentzen (Italy) Andrea Piccini (Austria) Karl Wendlinger	Aston Martin 6.0 L V12	MI	339
17	GT1	72	(France) Luc Alphand Aventures	(France) Luc Alphand (France) Guillaume Moreau (France) Jérôme Policand	Chevrolet Corvette C6.R	MI	335
17	GT1	72	(France) Luc Alphand Aventures	(France) Luc Alphand (France) Guillaume Moreau (France) Jérôme Policand	Chevrolet LS7.R 7.0 L V8	MI	335
18	LMP2	35	(France) Saulnier Racing	(France) Pierre Ragues (France) Matthieu Lahaye (China) Cheng Congfu	Pescarolo 01	MI	333
18	LMP2	35	(France) Saulnier Racing	(France) Pierre Ragues (France) Matthieu Lahaye (China) Cheng Congfu	Judd DB 3.4 L V8	MI	333
19	**GT2**	**82**	**(United States) Risi Competizione**	**(Italy) Gianmaria Bruni (Finland) Mika Salo (Brazil) Jaime Melo**	**Ferrari F430 GT2**	MI	**326**
19	**GT2**	**82**	**(United States) Risi Competizione**	**(Italy) Gianmaria Bruni (Finland) Mika Salo (Brazil) Jaime Melo**	**Ferrari 4.0 L V8**	MI	**326**
20	LMP2	40	(Portugal) Quifel ASM Team	(Portugal) Miguel Amaral (France) Olivier Pla (United Kingdom) Guy Smith	Lola B05/40	D	325
20	LMP2	40	(Portugal) Quifel ASM Team	(Portugal) Miguel Amaral (France) Olivier Pla (United Kingdom) Guy Smith	AER P07 2.0 L Turbo I4	D	325
21	GT1	73	(France) Luc Alphand Aventures	(France) Jean-Luc Blanchemain (France) Laurent Pasquali (France) Patrice Goueslard	Chevrolet Corvette C6.R	MI	325
21	GT1	73	(France) Luc Alphand Aventures	(France) Jean-Luc Blanchemain (France) Laurent Pasquali (France) Patrice Goueslard	Chevrolet LS7.R 7.0 L V8	MI	325
22	GT2	97	(Italy) BMS Scuderia Italia	(Italy) Matteo Malucelli (Italy) Paolo Ruberti (Italy) Fabio Babini	Ferrari F430 GT2	P	318
22	GT2	97	(Italy) BMS Scuderia Italia	(Italy) Matteo Malucelli (Italy) Paolo Ruberti (Italy) Fabio Babini	Ferrari 4.0 L V8	P	318
23	GT2	90	(Germany) Farnbacher Racing	(Germany) Pierre Ehret (Germany) Pierre Kaffer (Denmark) Lars-Erik Nielsen	Ferrari F430 GT2	D	317
23	GT2	90	(Germany) Farnbacher Racing	(Germany) Pierre Ehret (Germany) Pierre Kaffer (Denmark) Lars-Erik Nielsen	Ferrari 4.0 L V8	D	317
24	LMP1	14	(United Kingdom) Creation Autosportif	(United Kingdom) Stuart Hall (United Kingdom) Johnny Mowlem (Belgium) Marc Goossens	Creation CA07	D	316
24	LMP1	14	(United Kingdom) Creation Autosportif	(United Kingdom) Stuart Hall (United Kingdom) Johnny Mowlem (Belgium) Marc Goossens	AIM (Judd) YS5.5 5.5 L V10	D	316
25	GT2	99	(Monaco) JMB Racing (United Kingdom) Aucott Racing	(United Kingdom) Ben Aucott (France) Alain Ferté (France) Stéphane Daoudi	Ferrari F430 GT2	MI	312
25	GT2	99	(Monaco) JMB Racing (United Kingdom) Aucott Racing	(United Kingdom) Ben Aucott (France) Alain Ferté (France) Stéphane Daoudi	Ferrari 4.0 L V8	MI	312
26	LMP1	4	(France) Saulnier Racing	(France) Jacques Nicolet (Monaco) Marc Faggionato (Monaco) Richard Hein	Pescarolo 01	MI	311
26	LMP1	4	(France) Saulnier Racing	(France) Jacques Nicolet (Monaco) Marc Faggionato (Monaco) Richard Hein	Judd GV5.5 S2 5.5 L V10	MI	311
27	GT2	77	(Germany) Team Felbermayr-Proton	(Austria) Horst Felbermayr (Australia) Alex Davison (Germany) Wolf Henzler	Porsche 997 GT3-RSR	MI	309
27	GT2	77	(Germany) Team Felbermayr-Proton	(Austria) Horst Felbermayr (Australia) Alex Davison (Germany) Wolf Henzler	Porsche 3.8 L Flat-6	MI	309
28	GT1	50	(France) Larbre Compétition	(France) Christophe Bouchut (France) David Smet (France) Patrick Bornhauser	Saleen S7-R	MI	306
28	GT1	50	(France) Larbre Compétition	(France) Christophe Bouchut (France) David Smet (France) Patrick Bornhauser	Ford 7.0 L V8	MI	306
29	LMP2	32	(France) Barazi-Epsilon	(Netherlands) Michael Vergers (Denmark) Juan Barazi (United Kingdom) Stuart Moseley	Zytek 07S/2	MI	304
29	LMP2	32	(France) Barazi-Epsilon	(Netherlands) Michael Vergers (Denmark) Juan Barazi (United Kingdom) Stuart Moseley	Zytek ZG348 3.4 L V8	MI	304
30	GT1	59	(United Kingdom) Team Modena	(United States) Terry Borcheller (Brazil) Christian Fittipaldi (Netherlands) Jos Menten	Aston Martin DBR9	MI	302
30	GT1	59	(United Kingdom) Team Modena	(United States) Terry Borcheller (Brazil) Christian Fittipaldi (Netherlands) Jos Menten	Aston Martin 6.0 L V12	MI	302
31	LMP2	26	(United Kingdom) Team Bruichladdich Radical	(France) Marc Rostan (United States) Gunnar Jeannette (United Kingdom) Ben Devlin	Radical SR9	D	297
31	LMP2	26	(United Kingdom) Team Bruichladdich Radical	(France) Marc Rostan (United States) Gunnar Jeannette (United Kingdom) Ben Devlin	AER P07 2.0 L Turbo I4	D	297
32	GT2	80	(United States) Flying Lizard Motorsports	(Germany) Jörg Bergmeister (United States) Johannes van Overbeek (United States) Seth Neiman	Porsche 997 GT3-RSR	MI	289
32	GT2	80	(United States) Flying Lizard Motorsports	(Germany) Jörg Bergmeister (United States) Johannes van Overbeek (United States) Seth Neiman	Porsche 3.8 L Flat-6	MI	289
33	LMP1	11	(Japan) Dome Racing Team	(Japan) Tatsuya Kataoka (Japan) Yuji Tachikawa (Japan) Daisuke Itō	Dome S102	MI	272
33	LMP1	11	(Japan) Dome Racing Team	(Japan) Tatsuya Kataoka (Japan) Yuji Tachikawa (Japan) Daisuke Itō	Judd GV5.5 S2 5.5 L V10	MI	272
34 NC	GT1	55	(Russia) IPB Spartak Racing (Germany) Reiter Engineering	(Netherlands) Peter Kox (Netherlands) Mike Hezemans (Russia) Roman Rusinov	Lamborghini Murciélago R-GT	MI	266
34 NC	GT1	55	(Russia) IPB Spartak Racing (Germany) Reiter Engineering	(Netherlands) Peter Kox (Netherlands) Mike Hezemans (Russia) Roman Rusinov	Lamborghini L535 6.0 L V12	MI	266
35 NC	LMP1	24	(Japan) Terramos	(Japan) Yojiro Terada (Japan) Hiroki Katoh (Japan) Kazuho Takahashi	Courage LC70	MI	224
35 NC	LMP1	24	(Japan) Terramos	(Japan) Yojiro Terada (Japan) Hiroki Katoh (Japan) Kazuho Takahashi	Mugen MF408S 4.0 L V8	MI	224
36 DNF	GT2	96	(United Kingdom) Virgo Motorsport	(United Kingdom) Rob Bell (United Kingdom) Tim Mullen (United Kingdom) Tim Sugden	Ferrari F430 GT2	D	289
36 DNF	GT2	96	(United Kingdom) Virgo Motorsport	(United Kingdom) Rob Bell (United Kingdom) Tim Mullen (United Kingdom) Tim Sugden	Ferrari 4.0 L V8	D	289
37 DNF	LMP1	16	(France) Pescarolo Sport	(France) Emmanuel Collard (France) Jean-Christophe Boullion (France) Romain Dumas	Pescarolo 01	MI	238
37 DNF	LMP1	16	(France) Pescarolo Sport	(France) Emmanuel Collard (France) Jean-Christophe Boullion (France) Romain Dumas	Judd GV5.5 S2 5.5 L V10	MI	238
38 DNF	LMP1	23	(United States) Autocon Motorsports (United Kingdom) Creation Autosportif	(United States) Bryan Willman (United States) Michael Lewis (United States) Chris McMurry	Creation CA07	D	224
38 DNF	LMP1	23	(United States) Autocon Motorsports (United Kingdom) Creation Autosportif	(United States) Bryan Willman (United States) Michael Lewis (United States) Chris McMurry	Judd GV5 5.0 L V10	D	224
39 DNF	LMP2	45	(United Kingdom) Embassy Racing	(United Kingdom) Warren Hughes (United Kingdom) Jonny Kane (United Kingdom) Joey Foster	Embassy WF01	MI	213
39 DNF	LMP2	45	(United Kingdom) Embassy Racing	(United Kingdom) Warren Hughes (United Kingdom) Jonny Kane (United Kingdom) Joey Foster	Zytek ZG348 3.4 L V8	MI	213
40 DNF	LMP2	33	(Switzerland) Speedy Racing Team (United Kingdom) Sebah Automotive	(Switzerland) Steve Zacchia (Italy) Andrea Belicchi (France) Xavier Pompidou	Lola B08/80	MI	194
40 DNF	LMP2	33	(Switzerland) Speedy Racing Team (United Kingdom) Sebah Automotive	(Switzerland) Steve Zacchia (Italy) Andrea Belicchi (France) Xavier Pompidou	Judd DB 3.4 L V8	MI	194
41 DNF	LMP1	20	(Spain) Epsilon Euskadi	(Spain) Ángel Burgueño (Spain) Miguel Ángel de Castro (Spain) Adrián Vallés	Epsilon Euskadi ee1	MI	189
41 DNF	LMP1	20	(Spain) Epsilon Euskadi	(Spain) Ángel Burgueño (Spain) Miguel Ángel de Castro (Spain) Adrián Vallés	Judd GV5.5 S2 5.5 L V10	MI	189
42 DNF	LMP1	22	(Japan) Tōkai University (Japan) YGK Power	(Japan) Toshio Suzuki (Japan) Haruki Kurosawa (Japan) Masami Kageyama	Courage-Oreca LC70	Y	185
42 DNF	LMP1	22	(Japan) Tōkai University (Japan) YGK Power	(Japan) Toshio Suzuki (Japan) Haruki Kurosawa (Japan) Masami Kageyama	YGK YR40T 4.0 L Turbo V8	Y	185
43 DNF	LMP1	21	(Spain) Epsilon Euskadi	(Japan) Shinji Nakano (Sweden) Stefan Johansson (France) Jean-Marc Gounon	Epsilon Euskadi ee1	MI	158
43 DNF	LMP1	21	(Spain) Epsilon Euskadi	(Japan) Shinji Nakano (Sweden) Stefan Johansson (France) Jean-Marc Gounon	Judd GV5.5 S2 5.5 L V10	MI	158
44 DNF	LMP1	6	(France) Team Oreca-Matmut	(Switzerland) Marcel Fässler (France) Olivier Panis (France) Simon Pagenaud	Courage-Oreca LC70	MI	147
44 DNF	LMP1	6	(France) Team Oreca-Matmut	(Switzerland) Marcel Fässler (France) Olivier Panis (France) Simon Pagenaud	Judd GV5.5 S2 5.5 L V10	MI	147
45 DNF	LMP2	44	(Germany) Kruse Schiller Motorsport	(France) Jean de Pourtales (Japan) Hideki Noda (Denmark) Allan Simonsen	Lola B05/40	D	147
45 DNF	LMP2	44	(Germany) Kruse Schiller Motorsport	(France) Jean de Pourtales (Japan) Hideki Noda (Denmark) Allan Simonsen	Mazda MZR-R 2.0 L Turbo I4	D	147
46 DNF	LMP1	12	(Czech Republic) Charouz Racing System (United States) Team Cytosport	(United States) Greg Pickett (Germany) Klaus Graf (Netherlands) Jan Lammers	Lola B07/17	MI	146
46 DNF	LMP1	12	(Czech Republic) Charouz Racing System (United States) Team Cytosport	(United States) Greg Pickett (Germany) Klaus Graf (Netherlands) Jan Lammers	Judd GV5.5 S2 5.5 L V10	MI	146
47 DNF	GT2	78	(Italy) AF Corse	(Italy) Thomas Biagi (Finland) Toni Vilander (San Marino) Christian Montanari	Ferrari F430 GT2	MI	111
47 DNF	GT2	78	(Italy) AF Corse	(Italy) Thomas Biagi (Finland) Toni Vilander (San Marino) Christian Montanari	Ferrari 4.0 L V8	MI	111
48 DNF	LMP2	25	(United Kingdom) Ray Mallock Ltd. (RML)	(United Kingdom) Andy Wallace (United Kingdom) Mike Newton (Brazil) Thomas Erdos	MG-Lola EX265	MI	100
48 DNF	LMP2	25	(United Kingdom) Ray Mallock Ltd. (RML)	(United Kingdom) Andy Wallace (United Kingdom) Mike Newton (Brazil) Thomas Erdos	MG (AER) XP21 2.0 L Turbo I4	MI	100
49 DNF	LMP1	19	(United Kingdom) Chamberlain-Synergy Motorsport	(United Kingdom) Bob Berridge (United Kingdom) Gareth Evans (United Kingdom) Amanda Stretton	Lola B06/10	D	87
49 DNF	LMP1	19	(United Kingdom) Chamberlain-Synergy Motorsport	(United Kingdom) Bob Berridge (United Kingdom) Gareth Evans (United Kingdom) Amanda Stretton	AER P32C 4.0 L Turbo V8	D	87
50 DNF	GT1	53	(Germany) Vitaphone Racing Team (United Kingdom) Strakka Racing	(United Kingdom) Peter Hardman (United Kingdom) Nick Leventis (Brazil) Alexandre Negrão	Aston Martin DBR9	MI	82
50 DNF	GT1	53	(Germany) Vitaphone Racing Team (United Kingdom) Strakka Racing	(United Kingdom) Peter Hardman (United Kingdom) Nick Leventis (Brazil) Alexandre Negrão	Aston Martin 6.0 L V12	MI	82
51 DNF	GT2	94	(Switzerland) Speedy Racing Team	(Switzerland) Andrea Chiesa (Switzerland) Iradj Alexander (Switzerland) Benjamin Leuenberger	Spyker C8 Laviolette GT2-R	MI	72
51 DNF	GT2	94	(Switzerland) Speedy Racing Team	(Switzerland) Andrea Chiesa (Switzerland) Iradj Alexander (Switzerland) Benjamin Leuenberger	Audi 4.0 L V8	MI	72
52 DNF	GT2	85	(Netherlands) Snoras Spyker Squadron	(Germany) Ralf Kelleners (Russia) Alexey Vasilyev (United Kingdom) Peter Dumbreck	Spyker C8 Laviolette GT2-R	MI	43
52 DNF	GT2	85	(Netherlands) Snoras Spyker Squadron	(Germany) Ralf Kelleners (Russia) Alexey Vasilyev (United Kingdom) Peter Dumbreck	Audi 4.0 L V8	MI	43
53 DNF	GT2	76	(France) IMSA Performance Matmut	(France) Raymond Narac (United States) Patrick Long (Austria) Richard Lietz	Porsche 997 GT3-RSR	MI	26
53 DNF	GT2	76	(France) IMSA Performance Matmut	(France) Raymond Narac (United States) Patrick Long (Austria) Richard Lietz	Porsche 3.8 L Flat-6	MI	26
54 DNF	LMP2	41	(Switzerland) Trading Performance	(Saudi Arabia) Karim Ojjeh (France) Claude-Yves Gosselin (United Kingdom) Adam Sharpe	Zytek 07S/2	MI	22
54 DNF	LMP2	41	(Switzerland) Trading Performance	(Saudi Arabia) Karim Ojjeh (France) Claude-Yves Gosselin (United Kingdom) Adam Sharpe	Zytek ZG348 3.4 L V8	MI	22
55 DNF	GT2	83	(United States) Risi Competizione (United States) Krohn Racing	(United States) Tracy Krohn (Sweden) Niclas Jönsson (Belgium) Eric van de Poele	Ferrari F430 GT2	MI	12
55 DNF	GT2	83	(United States) Risi Competizione (United States) Krohn Racing	(United States) Tracy Krohn (Sweden) Niclas Jönsson (Belgium) Eric van de Poele	Ferrari 4.0 L V8	MI	12

=== Statistics ===
- Fastest Lap – #8 Peugeot 908 HDI (Stéphane Sarrazin) – 3:19.394
- Average Speed – #2 Audi R10 TDI – 216.3 km/h
- Fastest Trap Speed – #8 Peugeot 908 HDI-FAP – 350 km/h*
