= Jason Statham =

English actor (born 1967)

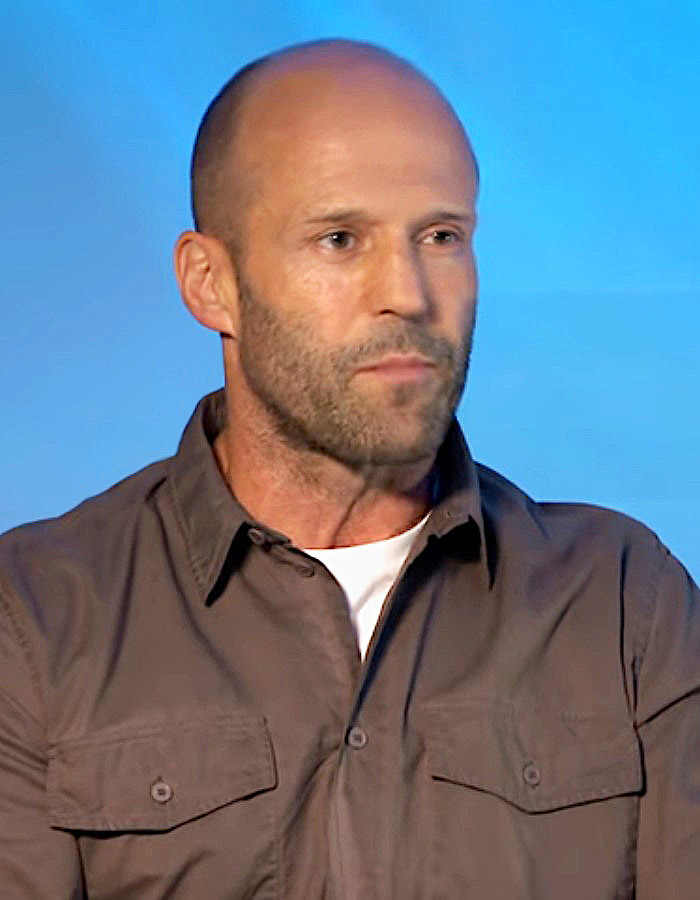
- Statham in August 2018
- Born: 26 July 1967 (age 59); Shirebrook, England
- Occupations: Actor; producer
- Years active: 1993–present
- Partner(s): Rosie Huntington-Whiteley (2010–present; engaged)
- Children: 2

Jason Statham (/ˈsteɪθəm/ STAY-thəm; born 26 July 1967) is an English actor. He is known for being typecast as tough, gritty, or violent characters in action thriller films, and has been credited for leading the resurgence of action films during the 2000s and 2010s. By 2017, his films had grossed over £1.1 billion ($1.5 billion), making him one of the industry's most bankable stars. Films in which he has appeared have grossed over $6.25 billion worldwide.

Statham began practising Chinese martial arts, kickboxing, and karate recreationally in his youth while working at local market stalls. An avid footballer and diver, he was a member of Great Britain's national diving team and competed for England in the 1990 Commonwealth Games. Shortly after, he was asked to model for French Connection, Tommy Hilfiger, and Levi's in various advertising campaigns.

Statham's history of working at market stalls inspired his casting in the Guy Ritchie crime films Lock, Stock and Two Smoking Barrels (1998) and Snatch (2000). Both films were commercial hits, and they helped catapult Statham to stardom. He went on to play supporting roles in the American action films Turn It Up (2000), Ghosts of Mars and The One (both 2001). From 2002 to 2008, he played the title role in the first three films in the Transporter film series (2002–2008), which solidified his status as an action star. In 2003, he appeared in the ensemble heist action film The Italian Job. He went on to play leading roles in commercially successful films such as Crank (2006), The Bank Job (2008), The Mechanic (2011), Homefront (2013), Mechanic: Resurrection (2016), The Meg (2018), Wrath of Man (2021), Meg 2: The Trench (2023), and The Beekeeper (2024), among others.

Statham has also starred as Lee Christmas in the ensemble action film series The Expendables (2010–2023) and as Deckard Shaw in the Fast & Furious franchise (2013–2023), including the spin-off Hobbs & Shaw (2019), which he co-produced. His voice acting work includes the documentaries Thai Boxing: A Fighting Chance (2002), Truth in 24 (2008) and its 2012 sequel, and the animated film Gnomeo & Juliet (2011).

== Early life and education ==
Statham was born on 26 July 1967 in Shirebrook, Derbyshire, to dancer Eileen (née Yates) and street seller Barry Statham. His father also worked odd jobs as a house painter, coal miner, and singer in the Canary Islands. Statham moved to Great Yarmouth, where he chose not to follow his father's career on the local market stalls, instead practising martial arts. He grew up alongside football player Vinnie Jones, with whom he would later act; Jones introduced him to football, and Statham played for the local grammar school, which he attended from 1978 to 1983. He was also passionate about diving, practising daily to perfect his techniques. He was a member of Great Britain's National Swimming Squad for 12 years, and competed for England at the 1990 Commonwealth Games in the 10 metre, 3 metre, and 1 metre events, coming tenth, eleventh and eighth respectively. He said in a 2003 interview that his time with the national squad was a "great experience" that taught him "discipline, focus, and certainly [kept him] out of trouble".

Statham was spotted by the sports modelling agency Sports Promotions while training at London's Crystal Palace National Sports Centre. He was signed by Tommy Hilfiger, Griffin, and Levi's for modelling contracts during their 1996 spring and summer collections. In 1997, he became a model for the clothing brand French Connection. A spokesperson for the high street chain said, "We chose Jason because we wanted our model to look like a normal guy. His look is just right for now: very masculine and not too male-modelly." However, he was still forced to follow in his father's footsteps as a street seller to make ends meet, stating that he sold "fake perfume and jewellery on street corners". He made small appearances in a few music videos, including "Comin' On" by the Shamen in 1993, "Run to the Sun" by Erasure in 1994, and "Dream a Little Dream of Me" by the Beautiful South in 1995.

== Career ==
=== 2000–2010: Rise to prominence ===
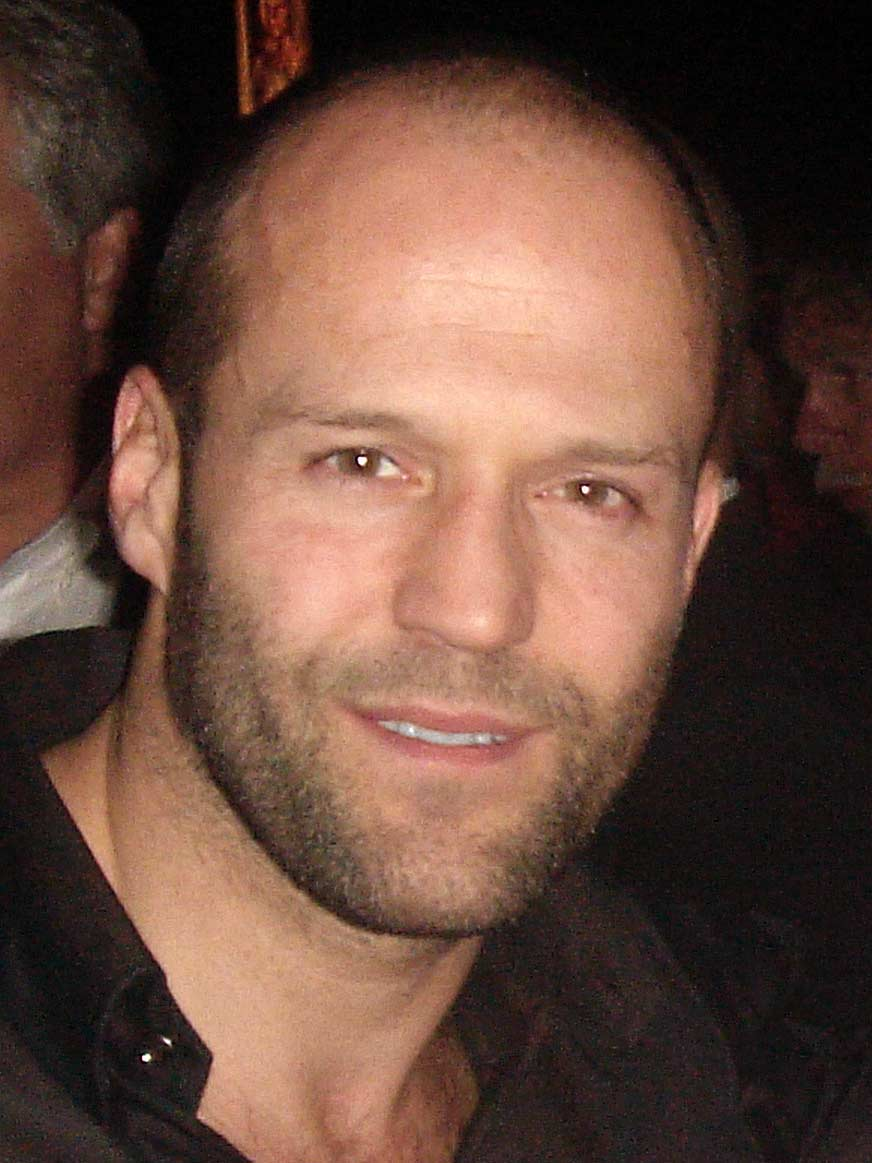
Statham in 2007

While working as a model for French Connection, Statham was introduced to fledgling filmmaker Guy Ritchie, who was developing a film and needed to fill the role of a streetwise con artist. After learning about Statham's past as a market stall salesman, Ritchie cast him in the crime comedy thriller Lock, Stock and Two Smoking Barrels (1998). The film was well received by both critics and audiences, and helped put Statham in the public eye; for his role, he was paid £5,000. Statham's second collaboration with Ritchie came with Snatch (2000), which earned more than $80 million at the box office. For his role in Snatch, he was paid £15,000. He was then able to break into Hollywood and appeared in two films in 2001: the science fiction action horror film Ghosts of Mars and the science fiction martial arts action film The One.

In 2002, he narrated the martial arts documentary Thai Boxing: A Fighting Chance (2002), which follows the lives of three individuals who come from very different backgrounds that are all training Muay Thai, each with their own unique motivations and stories, as they prepare for their next fight.

Statham was offered more film roles and was cast in the lead role of driver Frank Martin in the action film The Transporter (2002), written by Luc Besson. The film spawned two sequels, Transporter 2 (2005) and Transporter 3 (2008). He also played supporting roles in Mean Machine (2002), The Italian Job (2003), and as the lead villain in Cellular (2004).

In 2005, Statham was once again cast by Ritchie to star in his new project, Revolver, which was a critical and box office failure. He played a dramatic role in the independent film London in 2005. In 2006, he played the lead role in the action film Crank. Statham was asked to promote Crank during the 2006 San Diego Comic-Con Convention. In 2008, Statham starred in the British crime thriller The Bank Job and Death Race, a remake of Death Race 2000 (1975). American film critic Armond White hailed Statham's ascension as an action film star. On the occasion of Death Race, White championed Statham's "best track record of any contemporary movie star." Later in 2008, White praised Statham's Transporter 3 as a great example of kinetic pop art. Chris Hewitt of Empire Magazine, noted the film as "a dour, drab affair", but credited the film with "establishing Statham as a new action hero, as at ease with gruff one-liners as he was with Jackie Chan-esque high-kicking".

In 2009, Statham started to develop a new movie written by David Peoples and Janet Peoples. Statham stated "We've got a movie we're trying to do, written by David Peoples and Janet Peoples, in the vein of an old film, The Treasure of the Sierra Madre. It's not a remake or anything, but it's a little bit like that, about relationships and how greed contaminates the relationships these three people have. The working title is The Grabbers." He reprised his role as Chev Chelios in the 2009 sequel Crank: High Voltage.

In 2010, Statham appeared alongside fellow action stars Sylvester Stallone, Jet Li, Dolph Lundgren and Mickey Rourke, among others, in the ensemble action film The Expendables. Statham plays Lee Christmas, a former SAS soldier and expert at close quarters combat using knives. The film was commercially successful, opening at number one at the box office in the United States, the United Kingdom, China and India, and grossed a total of $274 million worldwide.

=== 2011–2015: Commercial expansion ===
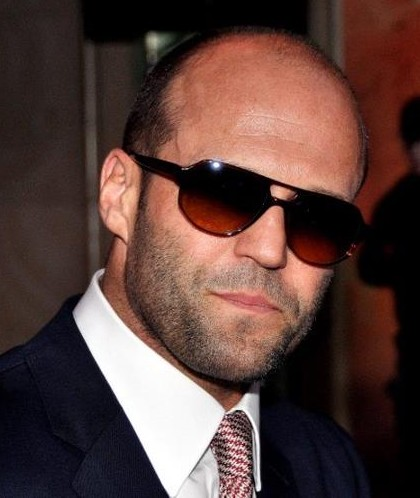
Statham in 2012

In his first film of 2011, Statham starred in the remake of the 1972 Charles Bronson film The Mechanic as Arthur Bishop. A theatrical trailer depicting Statham's character "shooting a man's head off" was banned from circulation by the Advertising Standards Authority for showing excessive violence. His role in The Mechanic was positively reviewed by the critics both in the United States and the United Kingdom. The Guardian praised his performance as possessing a "now-customary efficiency" in attaining "an entertaining hitman thriller". The New York Times noted Statham as "sleek as a bullet"; and the film "a more powerful recharge" of the original. UK newspaper, The Daily Telegraph hailed Statham as "England's best export to action movies in just about forever, a businesslike brute with gentlemanly soul." He returned to British film by starring in the police drama Blitz as Detective Sergeant Tom Brant. The film received mixed reviews with Cath Clake of The Guardian reviewing it as "not half bad" and "oddly entertaining". He was then cast in the action film Killer Elite. The film was based on real events, which were the subject of Sir Ranulph Fiennes' novel The Feather Men. Statham played an assassin named Danny who comes out of retirement to save an old friend, played by Robert De Niro. The film grossed returned a negative budget, and was panned by the critics.

In August 2011, he began filming Parker for director Taylor Hackford; the film was released in January 2013. Statham played Parker, the criminal antihero previously played by Mel Gibson in 1999's Payback and by Lee Marvin in 1967's Point Blank (though their characters were given different surnames). A. O. Scott of The New York Times said of the actor in the film: "[Statham], who seems to be made entirely of muscle and scar tissue, is comfortable with his limitations as an actor. His Parker, in any case, is more of an axiom than a fully rounded human being." A 2012 BBC News report estimated that his ten-year film career to date (2002 to 2012) yielded over one billion dollars in the box office, making him one of the industry's most bankable stars. He was signed on to reprise his role as Lee Christmas in The Expendables 2 in 2012.

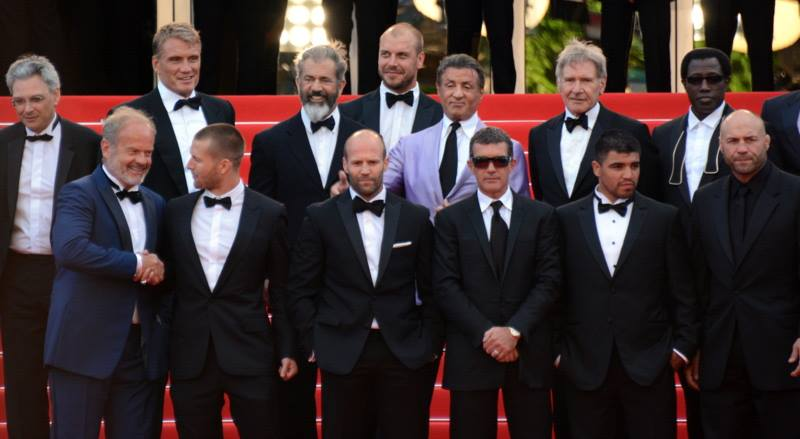
Statham (centre) at the 2014 Cannes Film Festival

In 2013, Statham had a cameo appearance at the end of Fast & Furious 6 as the brother of the film's antagonist Owen Shaw (Luke Evans). He reprised the character, this time as the main antagonist, in Furious 7, which was released in April 2015. He also starred opposite James Franco in the thriller Homefront, written by Sylvester Stallone, and headlined the British thriller Hummingbird. The latter film was praised by critics for pushing Statham's acting abilities to new heights. His "attempt to develop his 'brand' by trying more adventurous parts" noted by The Guardian's Mark Kermode, "[broadened] his dramatic palette". Statham made a cameo in the 2014 music video Summer of Calvin Harris as one of the car racers. In 2014, he returned as Lee Christmas in The Expendables 3. Although critically panned, the film would go on to gross $215 million against a $90 million budget.

In 2015, he starred in the action comedy Spy alongside Melissa McCarthy, Jude Law, and Rose Byrne. The film, a commercial success, was particularly praised for showcasing Statham's comedic side in contrast to his more serious roles. According to an article by Empire magazine, a Spy 2 was development in late 2015, with more screen time dedicated for Statham's character, Rick Ford. He was nominated for the Critic's Choice Award for Best Actor in a Comedy for his role in Spy.

Statham was offered a three-film contract to reboot the Transporter series in late 2015, but turned it down because he was not given the script before the signing date and unhappy with its compensation package. According to an article by The Guardian, Statham expressed interest in playing James Bond in the upcoming Spectre film. Its author, Steve Rose noted that "there was no doubt Statham can walk the Bond walk. And talking his talk can hardly be an issue with a character whose accent has fluctuated between Sean Connery's Scottish brogue and Timothy Dalton's Welsh." After the interview, there were multiple calls from critics and the public to instate him as James Bond in a future film.

=== 2016–present: Continued success ===
The sequel to his 2011 film The Mechanic was scheduled for production in late 2016 and announced to open as Mechanic: Resurrection. The film received mixed reviews but was highly commercially successful, grossing $109.4 million worldwide on a budget of $40 million. According to Forbes, the film was Statham's "seventh-biggest earner" and most commercially successful solo film venture of his career.

In February 2017, he starred alongside Gal Gadot in a 30-second Super Bowl advertisement for Wix.com during Super Bowl LI. CNET reported that the advertisement reached 22 million user impressions. Statham was asked to re-join the Fast & Furious franchise once more in 2016. The ensuing film, The Fate of the Furious, was released in April 2017 to commercial success. While the film overall received mixed reviews, Statham was praised for his comedic timing and onscreen chemistry with contemporaries. The film went on to be the third highest-grossing film of 2017 and the 12th highest-grossing film of all time.

Spy 2 was confirmed on 15 February 2018. But later in 2018, Feig explained that although a sequel to Spy could still happen, "there hasn't been any interest from the studio" in the project.

Statham played the lead, former Naval captain Jonas Taylor, in the 2018 action-horror film The Meg, which was released on 10 August. The film would go on to gross $527.8 million worldwide, becoming the highest-grossing U.S.-Chinese co-production of all time.

In 2019, Statham reprised his role as Deckard Shaw again in Fast & Furious Presents: Hobbs & Shaw, a spin-off of the Fast & Furious franchise focusing on his and Dwayne Johnson's characters. The film grossed $758 million worldwide, becoming the tenth highest-grossing film of 2019, and received generally positive reviews from critics, with praise for Statham's performance.

In 2022, Statham established his own production company, Punch Palace Productions

== Public image ==
An article by Adam Gabbatt in The Guardian noted that Statham's character contributions to his industry and film niche are "tough [and] uncompromising". Some critics note his presence as a "defining feature" that signals to movie-goers the content of a film. The same exposé commented, "You know what you're getting with a Jason Statham film. He will beat people up. He will crash cars. He will do an unconvincing American accent." Statham's impact on the action-thriller genre has been seen by Gabbatt as a replacement of the same undertaken by Arnold Schwarzenegger, Sylvester Stallone, and Jean-Claude Van Damme during their runs as headliners throughout the 1980s and 1990s. Statham himself cites Stallone, Bruce Lee, Paul Newman, Steve McQueen, and Clint Eastwood as his inspirations.

An article by Times Higher Education reported that Manchester University Press commissioned an academic study analysing the impact Statham has had on the British and American film industries from his debut in 1998 to 2018. According to the article, professors Steven Gerrard and Robert Shail are looking to show "the changing face of British cinematic masculinity" into "one that embraces cinema across a wide range of projects, but one that also uses cross-textual media in his output".

== In popular media ==
In 2003, Statham appeared in three British television commercials for the Kit Kat chocolate bar.

In the comic book series Ultimate Spider-Man, that series' version of the villain Vulture was rendered by artist Mark Bagley to resemble actor Statham, per writer Brian Michael Bendis' instructions.

In the Twenty One Pilots song "Pet Cheetah" released in 2018, Statham is mentioned in the lyrics.

== Personal life ==
Statham has been in a relationship with model Rosie Huntington-Whiteley since 2010. The couple announced their engagement in January 2016. Their son was born in June 2017. Their daughter was born on 2 February 2022. They lived in Beverly Hills for a number of years before moving back to London in 2020.

He holds a black belt in karate.

Statham enjoys wakeboarding, jet skiing, windsurfing, and rock climbing. He is known for performing many of his own stunts. While filming in Bulgaria for The Expendables 3, he drove a truck off the road in Varna and crashed into the Black Sea due to malfunctioning brakes.

In a 2013 interview with Vanity Fair, Statham advocated for stunt performers to be given their own category at the Academy Awards: "All of the stunt men, these are the unsung heroes. They really are. Nobody is giving them any credibility. They're risking their necks. And then you've got poncy actors pretending like they're doing [the stunts]."

In 2014, Statham was inducted into the International Sports Hall of Fame.

== Filmography ==
=== Film ===
Year	Title	Role	Notes	Reference(s)
1998	Lock, Stock and Two Smoking Barrels	Bacon		
2000	Snatch	Turkish		
2000	Turn It Up	Mr. B		
2001	Ghosts of Mars	Jericho Butler		
2001	The One	Evan Funsch		
2001	Mean Machine	Monk		
2002	The Transporter	Frank Martin		
2003	The Italian Job	Handsome Rob		
2004	Collateral	Airport Man	Uncredited cameo appearance	
2004	Cellular	Detective Ethan Greer		
2005	Transporter 2	Frank Martin		
2005	Revolver	Jake Green		
2005	London	Bateman		
2005	Chaos	Quentin Conners		
2006	The Pink Panther	Yves Gluant	Uncredited	
2006	Crank	Chev Chelios		
2007	War	John Crawford		
2008	The Bank Job	Terry Leather		
2008	In the Name of the King	Farmer / Camden Konreid		
2008	Death Race	Jensen Ames / "Frankenstein"		
2008	Truth in 24	Narrator	Documentary film	
2008	Transporter 3	Frank Martin		
2009	Crank: High Voltage	Chev Chelios		
2010	13	Jasper Bagges		
2010	The Expendables	Lee Christmas		
2011	The Mechanic	Arthur Bishop		
2011	Gnomeo & Juliet	Tybalt	Voice role	
2011	Blitz	Tom Brant		
2011	Killer Elite	Danny Bryce		
2012	Truth in 24 II	Narrator	Documentary film	
2012	Safe	Luke Wright		
2012	The Expendables 2	Lee Christmas		
2013	Parker	Parker		
2013	Fast & Furious 6	Deckard Shaw (Note: Statham's character in Fast & Furious 6 was not given a name at the time of the film's release.)	Cameo appearance	
2013	Hummingbird	Joseph "Joey" Jones		
2013	Homefront	Phil Broker		
2014	The Expendables 3	Lee Christmas		
2015	Wild Card	Nick Wild		
2015	Furious 7	Deckard Shaw		
2015	Spy	Rick Ford		
2016	Mechanic: Resurrection	Arthur Bishop		
2017	The Fate of the Furious	Deckard Shaw		
2018	The Meg	Jonas Taylor		
2019	Fast & Furious Presents: Hobbs & Shaw	Deckard Shaw	Also producer	
2021	Wrath of Man	Patrick "H" Hill / Mason Hargreaves		
2021	F9	Deckard Shaw	Cameo appearance	
2023	Operation Fortune: Ruse de Guerre	Orson Fortune	Also producer	
2023	Fast X	Deckard Shaw		
2023	Meg 2: The Trench	Jonas Taylor		
2023	Expend4bles	Lee Christmas	Also producer	
2024	The Beekeeper	Adam Clay	Also producer	
2025	A Working Man	Levon Cade	Also producer	
2026	Shelter	Michael Mason	Also producer	
2026	Mutiny	Cole Reed	Also producer	
2027	The Beekeeper 2	Adam Clay	Post-production; also producer	
2027	Jason Statham Stole My Bike	Himself	Post-production; also producer	
2028	Viva La Madness	X	Post-production; also producer	

Key
†	Denotes films that have not yet been released

=== Video games ===
Year	Title	Role	Notes	References
2002	Red Faction II	Mandril Shrike		
2003	Call of Duty	Sergeant Waters		
2015	Sniper X with Jason Statham	Team Leader	Mobile game	

=== Music videos ===
Year	Artists	Title	Role	Notes
1993	The Shamen	"Comin' On"	Background Dancer	
1994	Erasure	"Run to the Sun"	Background Dancer	
1995	The Beautiful South	"Dream a Little Dream of Me"	Moviegoer	
2002	Knoc-Turn'Al Feat. Samuel Christian	Muzik	Frank Martin	
2014	Calvin Harris	"Summer"	Driver	

=== Commercials ===
Year	Title	Role	Notes	References
1997	Soccer Nation			
1997	Lee Jeans			
2003	Kit Kat			
2009	Audi "The Chase"		Super Bowl Commercial	
2011	G-Energy			
2016	LG G5 & Friends			
2017	Wix.com		Super Bowl Commercial with Gal Gadot	
2024	Volkswagen Transporter	The Transporter		
2024	World of Tanks: Holiday Ops			

== Awards and nominations ==
Year	Nominated work	Association	Award	Result	Refs
2015	Spy	Broadcast Film Critics Association Awards	Best Actor in a Comedy	Nominated	
2015	Furious 7	Teen Choice Award	Choice Movie: Villain	Nominated	
2024	Expend4bles	Razzie Awards	Worst Picture	Nominated	
2024	Meg 2: The Trench	Razzie Awards	Worst Actor	Nominated	
