= Truth in 24 =

- Truth in 24 release poster
- Directed by: Keith Cossrow; Bennett Viseltear
- Written by: Keith Cossrow; Bennett Viseltear
- Produced by: Alan Brown; Matt Goldfine; Chuck Johnsen
- Starring: Jason Statham (narrator); Allan McNish; Rinaldo Capello; Tom Kristensen
- Cinematography: Jim Barry; David Dart; Matt Lyons; Dave Malek; Donald Marx; Hank McElwee; Allen Sandrow
- Edited by: Keith Cossrow; Bennett Viseltear
- Music by: David Robidoux
- Distributed by: Intersport; NFL Films
- Release date: October 25, 2008 (Chicago International Film Festival)
- Running time: 98 minutes
- Language: English

Truth in 24 is a 2008 documentary film edited, written and directed by Keith Cossrow and Bennett Viseltear detailing Audi's preparation for the 2008 24 Hours of Le Mans. The team is followed through several races prior to Le Mans, including the 12 Hours of Sebring and the 1000km of Monza. Neither race results in victory for Audi (although they did win class at Sebring) heading into Le Mans. The focus shifts to Le Mans itself, documenting the buildup to the race and the ultimate result of the race.

British action film actor Jason Statham is the film's narrator. Numerous Audi officials and drivers are interviewed through the film, including the eventual winning team of Allan McNish, Dindo Capello, and Tom Kristensen.

== Release ==
Truth in 24 had its television premiere on March 20, 2009, airing on ESPN. The release was the day prior to the 2009 12 Hours of Sebring. The film was released as a free download on iTunes on March 24, 2009.

On March 27, 2012, it was announced that a sequel would be made to Truth in 24, which was called Truth in 24 II and highlighted Audi's participation at the 2011 24 Hours of Le Mans.
