= Street Racer (film) =

- Directed by: Teo Konuralp
- Written by: Carey Van Dyke; Shane Van Dyke
- Produced by: David Michael Latt; David Rimawi; Paul Bales
- Starring: Clint Browning; Dorothy Drury; Robert Pike Daniel; Jason Ellefson; Dustin Fitzsimons; Jennifer Dorogi; Jack Goldenberg
- Cinematography: Alexander Yellen
- Distributed by: The Asylum
- Release date: May 27, 2008
- Running time: 85 minutes
- Country: United States
- Language: English

Street Racer is a 2008 action thriller film by The Asylum. It's meant to be a mockbuster of the film Speed Racer, but its overall plot bears a closer similarity to The Fast and the Furious, and particularly The Fast and the Furious: Tokyo Drift, which had been released in 2006. The film is advertised by The Asylum as being based on true events.

== Plot ==
Johnny Wayne is an ex-racer who serves 5 years in prison after crippling a young boy during an illegal street race in Los Angeles. Wayne, having been traumatised by the events, vows to never race again, and is soon released as a reformed citizen.

Whilst Johnny attempts to restore his life and become an honest, hardworking member of society, his parole officer has other plans for him. Johnny finds himself being blackmailed into street racing by his parole officer and the taunts of his former street racing associates. Johnny is given a job at a wrecking yard, owned by Red. Johnny and Red get off to a rocky start but end up becoming friends. Red teaches Johnny how to improve his racing skill. Johnny is assigned to volunteer community service as part of his parole and he winds up working at a rehabilitation facility where a boy, Danny/Daniel, crippled 5 years earlier in a car accident, gets his physical therapy as he tries to relearn to walk.

Danny and his older sister take a liking to Johnny. Johnny inspires Danny to give maximum effort to his physical therapy and Danny progresses. Johnny slowly comes to the realization that Danny is the boy he crippled in the wreck he caused 5 years earlier but does not know how to tell Danny and his sister. Danny's father sees Johnny at the rehabilitation facility, goes ballistic and reveals the truth to all. Danny's sister confronts Johnny about the hardship he has placed on Danny and his family, who struggle to make ends meet with staggering medical bills.

Johnny ends up racing his former friend/now rival Mickey Styles for the title of the ultimate street racer of Los Angeles and $10k.

The crooked parole officer bets against Johnny and instructs Johnny to lose or he will violate his parole and harm Danny and his family.

Johnny wins the race and $10k which he donates to Danny.

The crooked parole officer gets his just reward when he is hit by street racers and killed.

== Cast ==
- Clint Browning as Johnny Wayne
- Dorothy Drury as Kelly
- Robert Pike Daniel as "Red"
- Jason Ellefson as Mickey Styles
- Dustin Fitzsimons as Steve
- Michael Crider as Briggs
- Connor Herlong as Daniel
- T.J. Zale as Robert
- Reggie Jernigan as Derek
- Kelli Dawn Hancock as Armenia
- Sinead McCafferty as Sheila
- Jennifer Dorogi as Teddy
- Jack Goldenberg as Travis

== Reception ==
A review concluded: ”It’s almost as if Ned Flanders made a street racing movie.” Other commentators found it was a bad imitation of Fast and Furious films.

== See also ==
- The Fast and the Furious: Tokyo Drift - A similar film released in 2006
- Death Racers (2008) - Another racing film by The Asylum released in the same year
- Speed Demon - Another film by The Asylum released in 2003, which bears some similarity to Street Racer
- Speed Racer (2008)

== Cars ==
- 2008 Mazda Capella of Johnny Wayne
- Honda S2000 of Mickey Styles
- 1998 BMW Serie 3 of Steve and Johnny Wayne
- 1990 Chrysler Town & Country of Johnny Wayne and Derek
- 2008 Subaru Impreza WRX of Johnny Wayne
- 2007 Nissan GT-R of Mickey styles
- 1991 Porsche 944 (Cameo)
- 1990 Lamborghini Countach LP5000 QV of Mickey Styles
- 1980 Chevrolet Caprice (Cameo)
- Alfa Romeo 4c (Cameo)
